= Happy Days season 10 =

Season 10 of the television series Happy Days

Happy Days
- Season 10
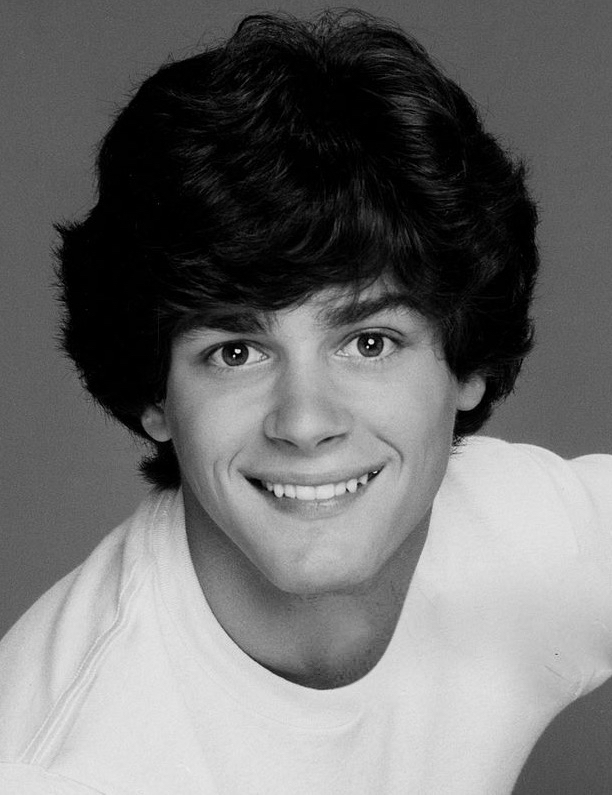
- Billy Warlock appearing in a promotional photo for the season
- No. of episodes: 22

Release
- Original network: ABC
- Original release: September 28, 1982 – March 22, 1983

Season chronology
- ← Previous; Season 9 Next → Season 11

The tenth season of Happy Days, an American television sitcom, originally aired on ABC in the United States between September 28, 1982, and March 22, 1983. The show was created by Garry Marshall, under the production company Miller-Milkis-Boyett Productions and Henderson Production Company, Inc., in association with Paramount Television.

== Background ==
Like seasons 8 and 9, this season also consists of 22 episodes, all of which were directed by Jerry Paris. More changes were made this season, with Erin Moran, Scott Baio and Al Molinaro making only guest appearances due to starring in the second season of the spin-off Joanie Loves Chachi. After being part of the recurring cast the previous two seasons, Cathy Silvers and Ted McGinley joined the main cast, along with Linda Purl (who had previously appeared in season 2 as Gloria), as Fonzie's girlfriend, Ashley Pfister. Heather O'Rourke, has a recurring role as Ashley's daughter, and guest stars include Billy Warlock and Crystal Bernard. Also, Pat Morita returns in this season as Arnold, the original proprietor of Arnold's Drive-In, to take over the restaurant after Al's departure. Guest stars from previous seasons make their final appearances in this season, including Melinda Naud (Paula from season 3) and Ed Peck (Officer Kirk). Anson Williams appears in six of the 22 episodes as Potsie. This season was the last to use the original recording of "Happy Days", in use since season 3, for the opening and closing credits.

The show led ABC Tuesday nights at 8:00 PM for a tenth consecutive season. However, as the 1982-83 television season was progressing, a new show, The A-Team debuted on NBC in January of 1983, airing on Tuesdays at 8:00 PM opposite Happy Days and Laverne & Shirley, outrating both shows and decreasing considerably their viewership. At the end of the season, The A-Team ended at number 10 and Happy Days ended at number 28.

== Main cast ==
- Henry Winkler as Arthur "Fonzie" Fonzarelli
- Marion Ross as Marion Cunningham
- Anson Williams as Warren "Potsie" Weber
- Cathy Silvers as Jenny Piccalo
- Ted McGinley as Roger Phillips
- Linda Purl as Ashley Pfister
- Tom Bosley as Howard Cunningham

== Guest stars ==
- Erin Moran as Joanie Cunningham
- Scott Baio as Chachi Arcola
- Crystal Bernard as K.C. Cunningham
- Billy Warlock as Flip Phillips
- Heather O'Rourke as Heather Pfister
- Pat Morita as Arnold
- Scott Berenstein as Melvin Belvin
- Harris Kal as Bobby
- Kevin Sullivan as Tommy
- Gary Friedkin as Clarence

== Broadcast history ==
The season aired Tuesdays at 8:00-8:30 pm (EST).

== Episodes ==
No. overall	No. in season	Title	Directed by	Written by	Original release date
212	1	"A Woman Not Under the Influence"	Jerry Paris	William Bickley & Michael Warren	September 28, 1982
Fonzie becomes weary about his inability to become happy by plowing through dates. He finds love at first sight with a woman he sees on an escalator, although he doesn't catch her name, and orders everyone at Arnold's to find her. Potsie recognizes the woman from his dad's gas station as Ashley Pfister, so Fonzie visits her at her apartment in hopes she will fall in love with him. Ashley proves to be unlike any other woman whom Fonzie ever dated, as she does not immediately fall under his influence. Note: First appearances of Linda Purl and Heather O'Rourke as Ashley Pfister (Fonzie's girlfriend) and her 6-year-old daughter Heather, respectively. Purl also had a recurring role in Season 2 as Richie's girlfriend Gloria.
213	2	"Letting Go"	Jerry Paris	Fred Fox, Jr. & Brian Levant	October 12, 1982
Joanie wants to move to Chicago with Chachi and attend Northwestern University. Notes: Erin Moran and Scott Baio appear in this episode to set up the spinoff Joanie Loves Chachi. Also, although out of order, this was the first episode of the season produced. Absent: Anson Williams as Potsie Weber; Ted McGinley as Roger Phillips; Linda Purl as Ashley Pfister.
214	3	"Empty Nest"	Jerry Paris	Paula A. Roth	October 19, 1982
Howard and Marion try to keep busy in their newly-empty house, while Fonzie decides to sell his half of Arnold's. Note: This episode marked the return of Pat Morita as Arnold, the original proprietor of Arnold's Drive-In; There have been 151 episodes aired since Arnold last owned "Arnold's" Guest starring: Harriet Nelson and Jane Wyatt. Absent: Cathy Silvers as Jenny Piccalo.
215	4	"A Night at the Circus"	Jerry Paris	Joe Glauberg	October 26, 1982
Fonzie takes Heather to the circus, as Howard's niece K.C. moves in. Note: Crystal Bernard returns in her new role of Howard's niece, K.C. Cunningham. Absent: Anson Williams as Potsie Weber; Ted McGinley as Roger Phillips.
216	5	"A Little Case of Revenge"	Jerry Paris	Fred Fox, Jr. & Rich Correll	November 9, 1982
An old nemesis of Fonzie (special guest star Tom Hanks) returns to seek revenge on Fonzie at an inopportune time. Absent: Anson Williams as Potsie Weber.
217	6	"Who Gives a Hootenanny?"	Jerry Paris	Ria Nepus	November 16, 1982
Joanie and Chachi have a chance to appear on TV playing folk music; however, Fonzie is upset that folk is usurping rock 'n' roll's place in people's hearts and minds. Guest starring: Scott Baio as Chachi Arcola; Erin Moran as Joanie Cunningham. Absent: Anson Williams as Potsie Weber.
218	7	"Going Steady"	Jerry Paris	Richard Gurman	November 23, 1982
Ready to settle down after all these years, Fonzie declares his love for Ashley by asking her to go steady; but when an old girlfriend of Fonzie's (Melinda Naud in her role of Paula Petralunga from Season 3) shows up needing help, it causes problems between Fonzie and Ashley. In a subplot, Howard gives K.C. driving lessons. Recurring guest: Scott Baio as Chachi Arcola. Note: Melinda Naud returns in her role of Paula Petralunga, who had appeared in a few episodes in Season 3 as Fonzie's most spectacular conquest. Absent: Anson Williams as Potsie Weber.
219	8	"Such a Nice Girl"	Jerry Paris	Nancy Steen & Neil Thompson	November 30, 1982
Melvin Belvin takes K.C. to Arnold's costume ball. Absent: Anson Williams as Potsie Weber; Linda Purl as Ashley Pfister.
220	9	"There's No Business Like No Business"	Jerry Paris	Story by : John B. Collins; Teleplay by : Paula A. Roth	December 7, 1982
Business is down at Cunningham Hardware, leading Howard to consider some very difficult options--one of which includes closing the store permanently. Recurring guest: Erin Moran as Joanie Cunningham. Absent: Linda Purl as Ashley Pfister.
221	10	"All I Want for Christmas"	Jerry Paris	Pamela Ryan & Beverly Bloomberg	December 14, 1982
When Heather asks Santa to patch up the rift between her mother and grandparents, Fonzie decides to make her wish come true. In a subplot, Howard's brother Dick is visiting. Absent: Anson Williams as Potsie Weber; Ted McGinley as Roger Phillips.
222	11	"Since I Don't Have You"	Jerry Paris	Brian Levant	December 28, 1982
Roger's old flame (Wendy Schaal) fans the fire when she returns to town. Absent: Anson Williams as Potsie Weber; Cathy Silvers as Jenny Piccalo.
223	12	"Hello, Pfisters"	Jerry Paris	William Bickley & Michael Warren	January 4, 1983
Ashley introduces Fonzie to her estranged family. Absent: Anson Williams as Potsie Weber; Cathy Silvers as Jenny Piccalo.
224	13	"I Drink, Therefore I Am"	Jerry Paris	Gary Murphy & Larry Strawther	January 11, 1983
Flip goes out with some friends who drink and become intoxicated; and while under the influence, the driver hits Heather with his car, severely injuring her. A furious Fonzie severely disciplines Flip when he finds out Flip was involved in the hit-and-run accident as well. Note: Final appearance of Scott Berenstein as Melvin Belvin. Absent: Anson Williams as Potsie Weber.
225	14	"Prisoner of Love"	Jerry Paris	Robert Pekurny	January 18, 1983
K.C. dates a convict who is on work release at Fonzie's garage. Absent: Anson Williams as Potsie Weber; Ted McGinley as Roger Phillips; Linda Purl as Ashley Pfister.
226	15	"Life Is More Important Than Show Business"	Jerry Paris	Paula A. Roth	January 25, 1983
Fonzie gets a record producer interested in Joanie and Chachi's music, but he's less excited about their band. Special guest stars: Scott Baio as Chachi Arcola and Erin Moran as Joanie Cunningham, as well as members of the cast of Joanie Loves Chachi; including Derrel Maury, Winifred Freedman and Robert Pierce. Side note: The logo of the fictitious "Holstein Records" seen in the episode is a knockoff of RCA Victor's famous Nipper the dog logo, which featured a Holstein cow staring into a gramophone. Absent: Anson Williams as Potsie Weber; Linda Purl as Ashley Pfister.
227	16	"Nervous Romance"	Jerry Paris	Robert Keats	February 1, 1983
Fonzie and Ashley celebrate their six months together at the Cunninghams', looking back on their relationship through "flashback scenes" (most of which were not actually part of "A Woman Not Under the Influence"). Note: Although out of order, this was the last episode of the season produced. Absent: Cathy Silvers as Jenny Piccalo.
228	17	"I'm Not at Liberty"	Jerry Paris	Pamela Ryan & Beverly Bloomberg	February 8, 1983
Fonzie, Potsie, and Roger report for Army Reserve duty. Fonzie promises Heather that he'll be at her birthday party--until he learns that Officer Kirk is their commanding officer. Note: Final appearance of Ed Peck in his role of Officer Kirk. Absent: Cathy Silvers as Jenny Piccalo.
229	18	"Wild Blue Yonder"	Jerry Paris	Richard Gurman & Larry Strawther	February 15, 1983
Fonzie and Roger miss the flight to the teacher's convention they plan to attend, so they instead opt to take Potsie's uncle's crop dusting plane--which crashes on the way, but the occupants survive.
230	19	"May the Best Man Win"	Jerry Paris	Richard Gurman	February 22, 1983
Fonzie becomes the center of attention at the wedding of a friend (Peter Scolari). Note: Al Molinaro returns as Father Anthony Delvecchio. Absent: Anson Williams as Potsie Weber; Linda Purl as Ashley Pfister.
231	20	"Babysitting"	Jerry Paris	Paula A. Roth	March 1, 1983
Fonzie babysits Heather on the night of a big fight on TV that Fonzie and the guys plan to watch, which conflicts with Fonzie's attention to Heather. Meanwhile, Joanie and Chachi return to Milwaukee--to stay. Note: This episode marks the return of Erin Moran and Scott Baio in their respective roles of Joanie and Chachi to the series' regular cast, due to the impending cancellation of Joanie Loves Chachi. Absent: Anson Williams as Potsie Weber.
232	21	"Turn Around...and You're Home"	Jerry Paris	Fred Fox, Jr. & Rich Correll	March 15, 1983
Joanie decides to move back in with her parents. Notes: Al Molinaro and Ellen Travolta return in their respective roles of Al Delvecchio and Louisa Delvecchio. Also, this episode marks the final appearances of Linda Purl and Heather O'Rourke in their respective roles of Ashley and Heather Pfister. Absent: Anson Williams as Potsie Weber.
233	22	"Affairs of the Heart"	Jerry Paris	Neil Thompson & Nancy Steen	March 22, 1983
Jenny sets her sights on dating an Olympic swimmer. Meanwhile, Fonzie wants a pool. Note: Final appearances of Crystal Bernard as K.C. Cunningham, Billy Warlock as Flip Phillips, and Cathy Silvers as Jenny Piccalo. Silvers would return as a guest in her role of Jenny Piccalo in the series finale "Passages." Absent: Anson Williams as Potsie Weber; Ted McGinley as Roger Phillips.
