= Happy Days season 11 =

Season 11 of the television series Happy Days

Happy Days
- Season 11
- No. of episodes: 22

Release
- Original network: ABC
- Original release: September 27, 1983 – July 19, 1984

Season chronology
- ← Previous; Season 10

The eleventh and final season of Happy Days, an American television sitcom, originally aired on ABC in the United States between September 27, 1983, and July 19, 1984. The show was created by Garry Marshall, under the production company Miller-Milkis-Boyett Productions and Henderson Production Company, Inc., in association with Paramount Television.

== Background ==
Like the three previous seasons, this season also consists of 22 episodes, all of which were directed by Jerry Paris. When its spin-off Joanie Loves Chachi was canceled in 1982, Scott Baio and Erin Moran returned to Happy Days, after being special guest stars during its tenth season, which also marked the departure of Cathy Silvers, who returned for the two-part series finale in 1984. Meanwhile, other regulars from season ten (Linda Purl, Crystal Bernard, Billy Warlock and Heather O'Rourke) did not return for this season.

This season also marked the return of former regulars Ron Howard and Don Most, after their departures in the seventh season's finale in 1980. Anson Williams, despite still being credited on the opening credits for this season, only appeared in five episodes. Williams and Most did not appear in the finale. Pat Morita, who played Arnold, made his final appearance in the first episode of the season. Al Molinaro, who played Al, returned for the series finale. The season began filming in May 1983 and ended in November of that year. Also, the title theme song was re-recorded in a more modern style. It features Bobby Arvon on lead vocals, along with several backup vocalists. To accompany this version, new opening and closing credits were filmed, and the flashing Happy Days logo was redesigned.

After ten consecutive seasons leading ABC Tuesday night at 8:00 PM, the network was forced to regroup after its most-successful spin-off, Laverne & Shirley, ended its run in May 1983. More importantly, a new show, The A-Team, debuted on NBC in January of that year and began airing on the same night and timeslot as Happy Days. Viewership for Happy Days declined throughout the 1982–83 television season, with the show ending at number 28 on the Nielsen ratings, while The A-Team ended at number ten. For the 1983–84 season, the show left its popular 8:00 PM timeslot and was moved half an hour to 8:30 PM. A new series, the ultimately short-lived show Just Our Luck, took its place. It stayed in that timeslot until the series finale, which aired on May 8, 1984. However, there were five "leftover" episodes that ABC didn't have time to air during the regular season due to the Winter Olympics and the spring run of a.k.a. Pablo. Four of these aired on Thursday nights during the summer of 1984; the fifth ("Fonzie's Spots") first aired in syndication on September 24, 1984. Due to its timeslot change and the rising popularity of The A-Team, ratings fell even further, ending at number 63, the show's lowest-watched season.

== Cast and characters ==
=== Main cast ===
- Henry Winkler as Arthur "Fonzie" Fonzarelli
- Marion Ross as Marion Cunningham
- Scott Baio as Chachi Arcola
- Erin Moran as Joanie Cunningham
- Anson Williams as Warren "Potsie" Weber
- Ted McGinley as Roger Phillips
- Tom Bosley as Howard Cunningham

=== Special guest stars ===
- Ron Howard as Richie Cunningham
- Don Most as Ralph Malph
- Lynda Goodfriend as Lori Beth Cunningham
- Al Molinaro as Al Delvecchio
- Ellen Travolta as Louisa Delvecchio
- Cathy Silvers as Jenny Piccolo
- Pat Morita as Arnold Takahashi
- Frances Bay as Grandma Nussbaum

=== Recurring cast ===
- Harris Kal as Bobby
- Kevin Sullivan as Tommy
- Steven Baio as Joey

== Broadcast history ==
The season aired Tuesdays at 8:30-9:00 pm (EST) and Thursdays at 8:00-8:30 pm (EST).

== Episodes ==
| No. overall | No. in season | Title | Directed by | Written by | Original release date | Rating (households) |
|---|---|---|---|---|---|---|
| 234 | 1 | "Because It's There" | Jerry Paris | William Bickley & Michael Warren | September 27, 1983 | 15.4 |
Fonzie realizes he never accomplished a goal he set for himself as a child, and begins to lose his edge. Only after a pep talk from Chachi does he regain his confidence and set out to attain his dangerous goal. He and Chachi celebrate at the top of the mountain. Meanwhile, Howard, Marion, and Chachi find a prized possession of Fonzie's and unknowingly... misplace it. Notes: In one scene, Fonzie wears an old beige windbreaker like the one he wore on early season 1 episodes, before the network allowed him to wear black leather regularly.; This episode marked the final appearance of Pat Morita in his role of Arnold.; This was the first episode of the season produced, filmed on May 26, 1983, four months before its airing.; This also became the first episode where the Happy Days theme song was updated.; Also starring: Harris Kal as Bobby; Kevin Sullivan as Tommy. Absent: Erin Moran as Joanie Cunningham; Anson Williams as Potsie Weber; Ted McGinley as Roger Phillips.
| 235 | 2 | "The Ballad of Joanie and Chachi" | Jerry Paris | Richard Gurman | October 4, 1983 | 15.3 |
Chachi resents Joanie's busy college life and wants to settle down. Joanie decides that she and Chachi won't be able to resolve their differences. Notes: The show's director, Jerry Paris appeared in this episode as Joanie's teacher.; This episode was filmed on June 16, 1983.; Also starring: Kevin Sullivan as Tommy; Jerry Paris as Teacher (uncredited) Absent: Anson Williams as Potsie Weber; Ted McGinley as Roger Phillips.
| 236 | 3 | "Where the Guys Are" | Jerry Paris | Nancy Steen & Neil Thompson | October 18, 1983 | 14.7 |
Roger, Potsie, and Chachi trick Fonzie into going to a singles resort to help him get over his breakup with Ashley. Notes: Fonzie explains his off-screen breakup with Ashley to the character portrayed by guest star Rita Wilson.; This episode was filmed on July 15, 1983.; Guest starring: Rita Wilson as Barbara McManus; Janine Turner as Debbie; Shawn Weatherly as Sissy; Robin Klein as Lisa.
| 237 | 4 | "Welcome Home: Part 1" | Jerry Paris | Fred Fox, Jr. & Brian Levant | October 25, 1983 | 26.7 |
Discharged from the Army, Richie and Ralph return home; but after life in the Army, Richie wants to move to California to pursue a career as a screenwriter, which doesn't sit too well with his parents. Notes: Richie, Fonzie, Potsie, and Ralph are reunited for the first time since the episode "Ralph's Family Problem" (the season 7 finale).; Richie's wanting to move to California to pursue a career as a screenwriter was possibly written as an inside reference to Ron Howard's real-life second career as a director.; This episode and the following were filmed on September 30, 1983.; Special guest stars: Ron Howard as Richie Cunningham; Don Most (billed as Donald Most) as Ralph Malph; Lynda Goodfriend as Lori Beth Cunningham. Also starring: Bo Sharon as Richie Cunningham Jr.; Walter Van as Dean McGrath; Blaine Bohlig as Monica. Songs performed: "Blueberry Hill" – performed by Anson Williams, Donny Most, Ron Howard and Henry Winkler.
| 238 | 5 | "Welcome Home: Part 2" | Jerry Paris | Fred Fox, Jr. & Brian Levant | November 1, 1983 | 26.8 |
Irritated at his parents' disapproval of his wanting to move to California so soon; Richie visits a local bar in search of solace, which he finds in a little too much to drink that makes him lose control. However, Fonzie finds Richie and encourages him to follow his dreams; and Richie and Lori Beth decide to leave for Hollywood, with the Cunninghams' blessing. Notes: This episode and the previous were filmed on September 30, 1983. Originally written as the series finale, however, several episodes were produced after this.; This episode marked the final appearance of Donny Most as Ralph Malph.; Although out of order, this was also the series' final episode filmed with Anson Williams as Potsie Weber.; Special guest stars: Ron Howard as Richie Cunningham; Don Most (billed as Donald Most) as Ralph Malph; Lynda Goodfriend as Lori Beth Cunningham. Also starring: Bo Sharon as Richie Cunningham Jr. Songs performed: "The Book of Love" (acapella) – performed by Anson Williams and Henry Winkler.
| 239 | 6 | "Glove Story" | Jerry Paris | Fred Fox, Jr. & Rich Correll | November 8, 1983 | 11.8 |
Tired of Fonzie treating him as a kid, Chachi enters a boxing tournament to try to earn some respect. But when Chachi breaks his hand practicing, he tries to keep it a secret. Notes: This episode was filmed on August 5, 1983.; This episode marked the first time Fonzie hits someone in the series.; Guest starring: Joe Nipote as Leo Epps; Sean O'Grady as Tiger Thompson; Arthur Batanides as Referee; Andy Steinfeld as Reginald Bandini; Peter Steinfeld as Elijah Bandini. Absent: Anson Williams as Potsie Weber.
| 240 | 7 | "Vocational Education" | Jerry Paris | Brian Levant | November 15, 1983 | 15.7 |
Roger and Fonzie are hired as the new administrative team at George S. Patton Vocational High School, a school notorious for disciplinary problems. Their plans to reform the school are easier said than done. Notes: This episode was filmed on June 3, 1983.; Steven Baio, Scott Baio's real-life brother, guest stars as Joey. He makes two more guest appearances in this season.; Guest starring: Crispin Glover as Roach; Ken Osmond as Freddie Bascomb; Kathryn Fuller as Mrs. Shellenback. Recurring guest: Steven Baio as Joey. Absent: Erin Moran as Joanie Cunningham; Anson Williams as Potsie Weber.
| 241 | 8 | "Arthur, Arthur" | Jerry Paris | Marc Flanagan & Craig Heller | December 6, 1983 | 13.4 |
Fonzie learns he has a long-lost brother, Arthur "Artie" Fonzarelli (Michael Holden), who comes to Milwaukee with bad news about Fonzie's estranged father. Note: This episode was filmed on June 30, 1983. Guest starring: Michael Holden as Artie; Candi Brough as Marlene; Randi Brough as Darlene; Jay Lomack as attendant. Absent: Anson Williams as Potsie Weber; Ted McGinley as Roger Phillips.
| 242 | 9 | "You Get What You Pay For" | Jerry Paris | John B. Collins | December 13, 1983 | 14.5 |
When Howard is constantly forced out of the bathroom by the household's other inhabitants, he decides to build a second bathroom. He hires Fonzie as the contractor and the shop students of Patton High to do the work - which Howard later realizes was a big mistake. Note: This episode was filmed on August 17, 1983. Guest starring: Wayne Morton as Dwight Mesmer; Andrew L. Paris as Shorty. Recurring guest: Steven Baio as Joey. Absent: Anson Williams as Potsie Weber; Ted McGinley as Roger Phillips.
| 243 | 10 | "Kiss Me, Teach" | Jerry Paris | Fred Fox, Jr. | January 10, 1984 | 14.0 |
Joanie gets her first teaching job at the infamous Patton High School, but her pride gets in the way of her reasoning when she refuses to heed Chachi's advice. Joanie gets in way over her head when a student devises a plan to show his feelings for his teacher, whether Joanie likes it or not. Notes: This episode was filmed on June 9, 1983.; This episode is the last of several "Fonzie-comes-to-the-rescue" episodes of the series, where Fonzie shows up to save Joanie from being a victim of sexual assault at the hands of one of the Patton students.; Guest starring: Edward Hartes as Frankie; Kathryn Fuller as Mrs. Shellenback; Anthony Thompkins as Dexter. Recurring guest: Steven Baio as Joey. Absent: Anson Williams as Potsie Weber; Ted McGinley as Roger Phillips.
| 244 | 11 | "The People vs. The Fonz" | Jerry Paris | Richard Gurman | January 17, 1984 | 16.7 |
Fonzie allegedly strikes a student who is bullying another student. With Roger's help, he has to defend his actions at a school board hearing. Notes: This episode was filmed on September 23, 1983.; This episode marked the second time Fonzie hits someone in the series.; Guest starring: Nancy Steen as Mrs. Friedman; Ben Slack as Alex Johnson; Jeffrey Kramer as Martin Smith; Michael Leon as Mickey; Grant Heslov as Dennis; Joe Mays as Mr. MacKenzie; Doug Widtfeldt as Stretch. Absent: Anson Williams as Potsie Weber.
| 245 | 12 | "Like Mother, Like Daughter" | Jerry Paris | Robert Pekurny | January 24, 1984 | 14.0 |
Howard gets jealous when Marion's old flame (special guest star Lyle Waggoner) comes for a visit, but gets really upset when he dates Joanie. Notes: This episode was filmed on August 25, 1983.; This episode marked the third and last time Fonzie hits someone in the series.; Guest starring: Lyle Waggoner as Frederick; Ellen Gerken as Monique. Absent: Anson Williams as Potsie Weber; Ted McGinley as Roger Phillips.
| 246 | 13 | "Social Studies" | Jerry Paris | Paula A. Roth | January 31, 1984 | 14.1 |
With Joanie and Chachi officially broken up, Chachi starts to doubt his ability to ask girls out. Fonzie tries to help, telling him he has "Fonzarelli Power." Note: This episode was filmed on June 24, 1983. Guest starring: Denise Halma as Karen; Katherine Kelly Lang as Kim. Also starring: Harris Kal as Bobby. Absent: Anson Williams as Potsie Weber; Ted McGinley as Roger Phillips.
| 247 | 14 | "The Spirit Is Willing" | Jerry Paris | Larry Strawther | April 24, 1984 | 12.9 |
While working on a 1950s car, Fonzie tells a few of his students that he wishes things could be the way they were in the '50s when he was younger, and he meets a young woman named Nancy Haley. When he later goes to Nancy's house to return her purse, he learns from the current residents that the previous residents had a daughter named Nancy - but she died in a car accident years ago. Note: This episode is loosely based on the 1965 Dickey Lee hit "Laurie (Strange Things Happen)," which itself is based on the urban legends known as the vanishing hitchhiker and Resurrection Mary; and because of it, the episode also reflects the teen death song phenomenon from that period. Guest starring: Alexa Hamilton as Nancy Haley; Patti Karr as woman. Also starring: Kevin Sullivan as Tommy. Absent: Anson Williams as Potsie Weber; Ted McGinley as Roger Phillips.
| 248 | 15 | "Fonzie Moves Out" | Jerry Paris | Nancy Churnin | May 1, 1984 | 15.54 |
When it appears the Cunninghams are planning to sell their home (so Howard can accept a job as vice president of a hardware store chain based in New York state), Fonzie may have to leave, too. Fonzie eventually gets his own apartment and adjusts to his new life. Note: This episode was filmed on October 28, 1983. Guest starring: Maggie Roswell as Joyce James; Ann Gillespie as Sharon; Stanley Brock as Maki Maki; Julie Paris as Ann. Absent: Anson Williams as Potsie Weber.
| 249 | 16 | "Passages" | Jerry Paris | Neil Thompson & Nancy Steen | May 8, 1984 | 20.0 |
| 250 | 17 | "Passages" | Jerry Paris | William Bickley & Michael Warren and Brian Levant & Fred Fox, Jr. | May 8, 1984 | 20.0 |
Joanie and Chachi realize that they were meant for each other, and Chachi proposes to Joanie, and she accepts. Meanwhile, Fonzie becomes a Big Brother to a young orphan named Danny (Danny Ponce), and decides to adopt him; however, Fonzie's dream may be derailed when he finds out about regulations prohibiting single parents from adopting. After Fonzie almost gets into trouble when Danny runs away from the orphanage to be with him, Howard learns of the restrictions, and he confronts the adoption agency on Fonzie's behalf - which leads to the agency reconsidering. On the day of Joanie and Chachi's wedding, Fonzie adopts Danny and Richie and Lori Beth arrive just in time to watch Joanie and Chachi tie the knot. Fonzie serves as Chachi's best man and Jenny is Joanie's maid of honor. Notes: The pregnancy of Richie and Lori Beth's second child is unresolved.; The series finale originally aired as a one-hour episode; in syndication, it is aired as a two-part episode. Though this episode is the finale, several earlier, unaired episodes were burned off by the network during the coming summer months. The finale was filmed on Stage 19 at Paramount Pictures Studios on November 7 and 11, 1983.; Potsie and Ralph are the only two characters in the original cast who did not attend Joanie and Chachi's wedding.; At the beginning of his speech to toast the newlyweds, Howard mentions that "Both of our children are married now," officially writing Chuck (from Seasons 1 and 2) out of existence.; Howard ends his speech, as well as the episode (and thus the series), by "breaking the fourth wall," looking directly into the camera and thanking to them "Thank you all for being part of our family" before raising a toast "to happy days". Afterward, a closing montage of classic clips from past seasons is played over a portion of "Memories" by Elvis Presley, before a final shot of the current cast celebrating Joanie and Chachi's marriage.; Special guest stars: Ron Howard as Richie Cunningham; Al Molinaro as Al Delvecchio; Ellen Travolta as Louisa Delvecchio; Cathy Silvers as Jenny Piccalo; Lynda Goodfriend as Lori Beth Cunningham and Frances Bay as Grandma Nussbaum. Guest starring: Danny Ponce as Danny; Pamela Dunlap as Doris; Bruce Gray as Mr. Hillary; Meredith Baer as Judy; Tom Silardi as Tony. Also starring: Harris Kal as Bobby; Kevin Sullivan as Tommy. Absent: Anson Williams as Potsie Weber.
| 251 | 18 | "So How Was Your Weekend?" | Jerry Paris | Paula A. Roth | June 28, 1984 | 13.67 |
Marion and Joanie spend a weekend with Marion's mother. Notes: This was the first of the next five previously unaired episodes to be aired in the summer months after the finale. Episodes #251-255 actually take place before "The Spirit is Willing", "Fonzie Moves Out" and "Passages."; This episode was filmed on October 6, 1983.; Guest starring: Billie Bird as Mother Kelp; Rhonda Aldrich as pizza person. Absent: Anson Williams as Potsie Weber.
| 252 | 19 | "Low Notes" | Jerry Paris | Al Aidekman | July 5, 1984 | 13.9 |
Chachi gets a job as a ballroom dancing instructor to pay back the half of the rent he owes Potsie. Note: This episode was filmed on July 28, 1983. Guest starring: Linda Kaye Henning as Jean Kelly; Eve Smith as Mrs. Wilson; Dolores Albin as Sylvia; Ralph Steadman as football player. Absent: Ted McGinley as Roger Phillips.
| 253 | 20 | "School Dazed" | Jerry Paris | Roger Garrett | July 12, 1984 | 13.8 |
Joanie tries to help one of her students who has a problem with drugs. Note: This episode was filmed on September 2, 1983. Guest starring: Elinor Donahue as Mrs. Broderick; Marta Kober as Jesse; Lee Anthony as Milton Broderick; Rick Lantz as Attendant. Absent: Anson Williams as Potsie Weber.
| 254 | 21 | "Good News, Bad News" | Jerry Paris | William Bickley & Michael Warren | July 19, 1984 | 13.5 |
Chachi is devastated when he learns he has diabetes. Notes: This episode was filmed on October 14, 1983.; This was the final episode originally aired on ABC.; In the first scene, Scott Baio's song "Some Girls" was heard on the radio. "Some Girls" was included on Baio's second album The Boys Are Out Tonight (1983).; Guest starring: Martin Ferrero as Omar; Neil Thompson as D.J. Absent: Anson Williams as Potsie Weber.
| 255 | 22 | "Fonzie's Spots" | Jerry Paris | Bob Brunner and Ken Hecht | Aired in syndication | N/A |
Howard's position as the Grand Poobah at the Leopard Lodge is threatened when he realizes he hasn't recruited any new members in the past five years; so Fonzie, Roger, and Chachi volunteer to join. Notes: This episode was filmed on July 22, 1983.; This was the only episode of the series that wasn't originally aired on ABC, as it was aired around September 1984 in syndication. Although this was the final episode to be aired due to some previously unaired episodes being presented in the coming summer months after the finale, the episode is actually #251 in chronological order.; Guest starring: David Ketchum as Donald; Penina Segall as little girl.
