= Happy Days season 9 =

Season 9 of the television series Happy Days

Happy Days
- Season 9
- No. of episodes: 22

Release
- Original network: ABC
- Original release: October 6, 1981 – March 23, 1982

Season chronology
- ← Previous; Season 8 Next → Season 10

This is a list of episodes from the ninth season of Happy Days.

== Main cast ==
- Henry Winkler as Arthur "Fonzie" Fonzarelli
- Marion Ross as Marion Cunningham
- Anson Williams as Warren "Potsie" Weber
- Erin Moran as Joanie Cunningham
- Al Molinaro as Alfred "Al" Delvecchio
- Scott Baio as Chachi Arcola
- Lynda Goodfriend as Lori Beth Allen Cunningham
- Tom Bosley as Howard Cunningham

== Guest stars ==
- Cathy Silvers as Jenny Piccalo
- Ted McGinley as Roger Phillips
- Ellen Travolta as Louisa Arcola
- Billy Warlock as Flip Phillips
- Denis Mandel as Eugene Belvin
- Scott Berenstein as Melvin Belvin
- Harris Kal as Bobby
- Kevin Sullivan as Tommy
- Ed Peck as Officer Kirk

== Broadcast history ==
The season aired Tuesdays at 8:00-8:30 pm (EST).

== Episodes ==
- Consisted of 22 episodes airing on ABC.
- This is the last season to feature Lynda Goodfriend as Lori Beth Allen Cunningham.
- This is the last season to feature Al Molinaro, Erin Moran and Scott Baio as Al Devecchio, Joanie Cunningham and Chachi Arcola respectively before leaving the show to star in a short-lived spinoff called Joanie Loves Chachi.

No. overall	No. in season	Title	Directed by	Written by	Original release date
190	1	"Home Movies"	Jerry Paris	Brian Levant & Fred Fox, Jr.	October 6, 1981
191	2	"Home Movies"	Jerry Paris	Brian Levant & Fred Fox, Jr.	October 6, 1981
Family events of summer 1962 unfold in this episode. Joanie and Chachi have a falling out over another girl. Lori Beth learns that she is pregnant. Howard dreads growing old and Marion tries to remind him that having a grandchild will make them feel young again, giving them plenty of happy memories of when their children were babies. Potsie is hired to work at Cunningham Hardware. Roger pursues a girl. Fonzie reunites with the Falcons--all of which is recorded as a montage on a home movie that Joanie sends to Richie.
192	3	"Not with My Mother, You Don't"	Jerry Paris	Bob Howard	October 13, 1981
Chachi has a hard time accepting the fact that his mother (Ellen Travolta) is dating. Fonzie has bitter feelings toward Potsie when he is invited to supper with the Cunninghams and he himself is not asked. Absent: Lynda Goodfriend as Lori Beth.
193	4	"Another Night at Antoine's"	Jerry Paris	Mark Rothman	October 20, 1981
Chachi suggests to Joanie that they should date other people; but with Chachi's jealousy, the idea backfires on him when Joanie makes a date with another guy at a classy restaurant. Chachi then coaxes Fonzie into visiting the restaurant with him so they can spy on Joanie and her date. Absent: Anson Williams as Potsie Weber; Lynda Goodfriend as Lori Beth.
194	5	"Little Baby Cunningham"	Jerry Paris	Babaloo Mandel & Fred Fox, Jr.	November 3, 1981
With Richie in the Army, Lori Beth calls on Fonzie to stand in as Richie's proxy when it is time to deliver her baby. Absent: Anson Williams as Potsie Weber.
195	6	"The Other Guy"	Jerry Paris	Nancy Churnin & Louise Bryant	November 10, 1981
Fonzie and Roger date the same girl. Absent: Anson Williams as Potsie Weber.
196	7	"Fonzie the Substitute" "Give Me Puberty or Give Me Death"	Jerry Paris	Ralph Farquhar	November 17, 1981
Fonzie fills in as a substitute teacher for Roger and inadvertently causes trouble for him by raising the issue of sex education. Note: This episode marks the first appearance of Scott Bernstein as Melvin Belvin. Absent: Anson Williams as Potsie Weber; Lynda Goodfriend as Lori Beth.
197	8	"Just a Piccalo"	Jerry Paris	Mark Rothman	November 24, 1981
Jenny and Joanie end up in serious trouble when a sorority asks them to break the law and steal a statue from a local park in order to become members. Special guest star: Phil Silvers (Cathy Silvers' father) as Mr. Piccalo, Jenny's father. Note: Ed Peck returns in his recurring role of Officer Kirk, who busts Joanie and Jenny. Absent: Anson Williams as Potsie Weber; Lynda Goodfriend as Lori Beth.
198	9	"The Nun's Story" "No Thank You"	Jerry Paris	Charlotte M. Dobbs	December 1, 1981
Fonzie has a serious relationship with a girl who has a secret—she's a nun. Note: Scott Baio and Erin Moran sing "I Got You" in the opening scene. Absent: Anson Williams as Potsie Weber.
199	10	"Baby, It's Cold Inside"	Jerry Paris	Cindy Begel & Lesa Kite	December 8, 1981
Joanie babysits her new nephew when the household's heating system malfunctions. Note: This is the only time the Belvin brothers appear together in the same episode.
200	11	"Hello, Tough Guy"	Jerry Paris	William Bickley & Michael Warren	December 15, 1981
Joanie and Chachi call on Fonzie to try to transform nerdy Eugene into a tough-as-nails fighter to impress Jenny. Absent: Marion Ross as Marion Cunningham; Anson Williams as Potsie Weber; Lynda Goodfriend as Lori Beth.
201	12	"To Beanie or Not to Beanie"	Jerry Paris	Holly White & Stephanie Garman	January 5, 1982
Joanie is faced with the decision of what college to attend.
202	13	"Southern Crossing"	Jerry Paris	Story by : Brian Levant; Teleplay by : Richard Gurman	January 12, 1982
Fonzie and Al travel to Alabama to participate in civil rights activities with the Freedom Riders in 1962. Absent: Anson Williams as Potsie Weber; Lynda Goodfriend as Lori Beth.
203	14	"Grandma Nussbaum"	Jerry Paris	James P. Dunne & Barry O'Brien	January 19, 1982
Fonzie and Chachi visit their grandmother Nussbaum (Frances Bay); but when they notice her acting abnormally, Fonzie and Chachi believe she is going senile. Worried about her living alone in that condition, Fonzie suggests that Grandma move into a retirement community, which does not sit too well with her. Absent: Anson Williams as Potsie Weber; Al Molinaro as Al Delvecchio.
204	15	"Poobah, Doo Dah"	Jerry Paris	Bosco McGowan	January 26, 1982
When Frankie Avalon (who portrays himself as Al's distant cousin) informs Al that he would not be able to headline the Leopard Lodge's annual Poobah Doo Dah musical due to family issues, Al persuades Fonzie to impersonate him—which turns out to be a disaster. However, Avalon does show up at the last minute and performs his signature song "Venus" to an audience of swooning girls—including Jenny, who climbs onstage and wraps her arms around Avalon's leg, reluctant to let go. Special guest star: Frankie Avalon as himself. Side note: In the "Venus" sequence, Avalon lip-synced his original recording of the song.
205	16	"A Touch of Classical"	Jerry Paris	Fred Fox, Jr. & Rich Correll	February 2, 1982
After becoming fascinated by Tchaikovsky, Fonzie tries to turn the kids on to classical music.
206	17	"Hi-Yo Fonzie, Away!"	Jerry Paris	Fred Fox, Jr. & Rich Correll	February 9, 1982
The gang works to give Fonzie the birthday present of his life—a face-to-face meeting with his hero, the Lone Ranger. Note: The Lone Ranger is played by actor John Hart, who played the Masked Man from 1952 to 1953. Clayton Moore, best known as the Lone Ranger in the TV series, was prohibited from appearing due to a legal dispute with the owner of the Ranger character.
207	18	"Great Expectations"	Jerry Paris	Andrew M. Horowitz	February 16, 1982
Joanie and Chachi collaborate on a song, Potsie wants to join the Leopard Lodge, and Marion gets the lead in a musical. This is the second of two Happy Days episodes with the title "Great Expectations", as a second season episode also bears this title. Absent: Lynda Goodfriend as Lori Beth.
208	19	"Hello, Flip"	Jerry Paris	Paula A. Roth	February 23, 1982
Roger's juvenile delinquent brother Flip (Billy Warlock) comes to Milwaukee to straighten out his life. Note: First appearance of Billy Warlock as Roger's brother Flip Phillips.
209	20	"Chachi's Future"	Jerry Paris	William Bickley & Michael Warren	March 2, 1982
Chachi decides to give up his dreams of rock stardom and take a more practical job as a floor cleaning machine salesman. But when his first demonstration at Arnold's turns out to be a flop, Chachi reverts to his ambition as a rock star. Guest star: Danny Wells.
210	21	"Tell-Tale Tart"	Jerry Paris	Mel Sherer & Steve Grant	March 16, 1982
Jealous of the attention Joanie had been giving to her new friend Mikki (Crystal Bernard), Jenny spreads a vicious rumor that Fonzie had gotten Mikki in trouble. Notes: Final appearance of Eugene Belvin (Denis Mandel), who coincidentally had a significant role in this episode when he bribes his crush Jenny into being his girlfriend for a month in exchange for him keeping quiet about the rumor Jenny started. This episode also marks the first appearance of Crystal Bernard as Mikki, who would return the following season to join the semi-regular cast as Joanie's cousin K.C. Cunningham. This episode marks the final regular appearance of Lynda Goodfriend as Lori Beth Cunningham.
211	22	"Love and Marriage"	Jerry Paris	Barry Rubinowitz	March 23, 1982
Al seeks permission to marry Chachi's mother. Note: This episode has two endings, one where Al and the Arcolas move to Chicago to set up the spinoff Joanie Loves Chachi; and the other, for syndication purposes, where they appear to stay in Milwaukee. This episode marks the final regular appearance of Al Molinaro as Alfred Delvecchio. Absent: Lynda Goodfriend as Lori Beth.
