= Happy Days season 3 =

Season 3 of the television series Happy Days

Happy Days
- Season 3
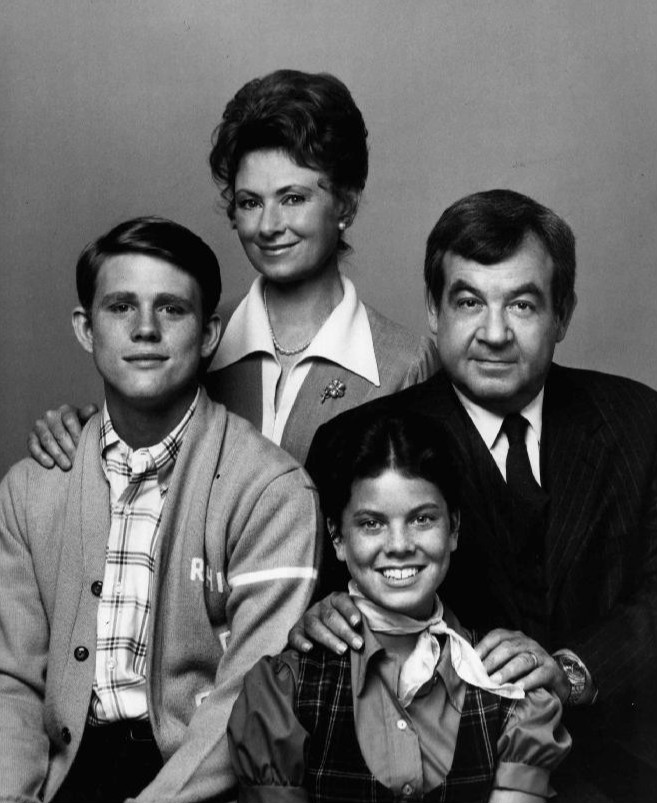
- Ron Howard, Marion Ross, Tom Bosley, and Erin Moran posing for a photo to promote the season
- No. of episodes: 24

Release
- Original network: ABC
- Original release: September 9, 1975 – March 2, 1976

Season chronology
- ← Previous; Season 2 Next → Season 4

This is a list of episodes from the third season of Happy Days. It was the first season of the show to be filmed in front of a live audience.

== Main cast ==
- Ron Howard as Richie Cunningham
- Henry Winkler as Arthur "Fonzie" Fonzarelli
- Marion Ross as Marion Cunningham
- Anson Williams as Warren "Potsie" Weber
- Don Most as Ralph Malph
- Erin Moran as Joanie Cunningham
- Tom Bosley as Howard Cunningham

== Guest stars ==
- Pat Morita as Mitsumo "Arnold" Takahashi
- Danny Butch as Raymond "Spike" Fonzarelli
- Jack Baker as "Sticks" Downey
- Penny Marshall as Laverne De Fazio
- Cindy Williams as Shirley Feeney
- Jack Dodson as Dr. Mickey Malph
- Ed Peck as Officer Kirk
- Kristoff St. John as Booker Brown
- Beatrice Colen as Marsha Simms

== Broadcast history ==
The season aired Tuesdays at 8:00-8:30 pm (EST).

== Episodes ==
No. overall	No. in season	Title	Directed by	Written by	Original release date
40	1	"Fonzie Moves In"	Jerry Paris	Lowell Ganz & Mark Rothman	September 9, 1975
Howard's hardware store begins facing competition. Now increasingly concerned about finances, Howard decides to rent the room above the family garage to generate some extra income. He looks around for a suitable tenant, but becomes aghast when Richie rents it to Fonzie. Howard is certain that Fonzie's unsuitable and plans to evict him. Notes: As of this episode, Happy Days permanently switched from a single-camera setup to a multi-camera setup with a live studio audience. To accommodate, the main sets were rebuilt - most notably the interior of the Cunningham house. Also, Fonzie's catchphrase "Sit on it" and his nickname for Joanie, "Shortcake," are first spoken.
41	2	"The Motorcycle"	Jerry Paris	William S. Bickley & Michael Warren	September 16, 1975
Fonzie is devastated when he discovers that someone wrecked his beloved motorcycle, leaving it scattered in pieces. Vengeance is vowed, and soon a plan is hatched to track down the culprit—-but why is Ralph acting so concerned?
42	3	"Fearless Fonzarelli: Part 1"	Jerry Paris	Michael Weinberger	September 23, 1975
Worried that he is losing his edge, Fonzie decides to attempt to break a record and jump fourteen garbage cans on his motorcycle. The stunt is set to be televised on the TV show You Wanted to See It. Note: Pat Morita appears as Arnold for the first time in this episode. Side notes: You Wanted to See It was a takeoff on the 50s hit television show You Asked for It, and starred that show's original host Jack Smith. Also, Fonzie's attempted motorcycle stunt is based loosely on the Evel Knievel phenomenon from the 1970s.
43	4	"Fearless Fonzarelli: Part 2"	Jerry Paris	Bob Brunner	September 30, 1975
Fonzie is successful in his motorcycle jump, but he crashes into Arnold's chicken stand, injuring his leg. He faces surgery to repair a torn cartilage in his knee; and self-conscious about his condition, Fonzie secludes himself by making himself at home on the Cunninghams' sofa.
44	5	"The Other Richie Cunningham"	Jerry Paris	Dick Bensfield & Perry Grant	October 7, 1975
Howard is possibly about to close a big business deal for his hardware store, and asks Richie to take the client's daughter on a date. But Richie already has another important date planned, so he asks Potsie to take his place and pose as Richie, causing chaos.
45	6	"Richie Fights Back"	Jerry Paris	Arthur Silver	October 14, 1975
After being humiliated in front of his date by local hoodlums Frankie and Rocco, Richie turns to Fonzie for advice, and soon decides that he wants to learn jujitsu to defend and stand up for himself. In 1997, TV Guide ranked this episode #88 on its list of the 100 Greatest Episodes.
46	7	"Jailhouse Rock"	Arthur Fisher	Bob Brunner	October 21, 1975
Officer Kirk imposes a 10:00pm curfew after some unruly kids break a window at the school. Richie and his friends plan to demonstrate against the strict curfew, but things don't go according to plan. Note: Ed Peck makes his first appearance as the gang's nemesis Officer Kirk in this episode.
47	8	"Howard's 45th Fiasco"	Jerry Paris	Frank Buxton	October 28, 1975
It's Howard's 45th birthday but he is down about it, feeling he hasn't achieved very much in his life. Channeling this, everyone decides to put on a This Is Your Life-type show for him; but it makes him even more depressed, and he considers fleeing to Tahiti. Note: When Howard comes back home, he says that he has a smart son, a lovely daughter, and a beautiful wife. But he doesn't mention Chuck, his oldest son, as his character was phased out of the show in the Season 2 and is retconed to never have existed.
48	9	"Fonzie the Flatfoot"	Jerry Paris	Story by : Arthur Silver; Teleplay by : Marty Nadler	November 4, 1975
With rumors of a possible fight between Fonzie's former gang the Falcons and their rivals the Dragons, Officer Kirk asks Howard to persuade Fonzie to become a special officer to keep the peace. Note: This episode marks the last official appearance of Marsha Simms (Beatrice Colen). She would later return for a flashback scene in the season five episode "Our Gang."
49	10	"A Date with Fonzie"	Jerry Paris	Lowell Ganz & Mark Rothman	November 11, 1975
Richie is in a slump meeting and dating women. After a little help from Fonzie ends in yet another failed attempt, Fonzie thinks he's found the perfect girls for a double date—Laverne and Shirley. Note: This episode introduces Penny Marshall as Laverne DeFazio and Cindy Williams as Shirley Feeney. They would subsequently star in their own series, which is a spin-off of Happy Days, from 1976 to 1983.
50	11	"Three on a Porch"	Jerry Paris	Bobby Boswell & Tiffany York	November 18, 1975
Richie, Potsie, and Ralph think they have rented a cabin at Lake Whitefish for the Easter holiday, but find out instead that they have only rented the porch of the place. Nevertheless, they decide to stay and pose as rich Tunisian businessmen when they discover that their neighbors are three attractive young women. Absent: Erin Moran as Joanie Cunningham
51	12	"Fonzie's New Friend"	Jerry Paris	Sid Arthur & Artie Laing	November 25, 1975
The Fonz has struck up a friendship with Sticks Downey, a new youth in the area, and has enlisted him to play drums with the band at Richie's upcoming Hawaiian luau. But racial prejudices arise when Sticks turns out to be black. Notes: "Bag" (Neil J. Schwartz) makes a rare appearance after being absent for several episodes. Also, "Sticks" Downey (Jack Baker) makes his debut.
52	13	"They Call It Potsie Love"	Jerry Paris	Marty Nadler	December 2, 1975
Potsie serenades Joanie with "Put Your Head on My Shoulder" to practice audience contact . . . but Joanie develops a crush on him, writing him secret admirer notes on Fonzie's advice, and arranging a midnight meeting at Arnold's that doesn't end quite the way either she or a formerly flattered Potsie hope.
53	14	"Tell It to the Marines"	Jerry Paris	Sid Arthur & Artie Laing	December 16, 1975
After being jilted by his girlfriend, Ralph becomes convinced that he's useless and not sophisticated enough to ever keep a girl interested in him, and threatens to join the Marines.
54	15	"Dance Contest"	Norm Gray	Bob Howard	January 6, 1976
Tired of the monotony of everyday house chores, Marion tries to get Howard to enter a televised dance contest with her. When he refuses, she secretly enlists Fonzie to be her partner, but Howard soon becomes suspicious that Marion is having an affair.
55	16	"The Second Anniversary Show"	Jerry Paris	Bob Brunner & Arthur Silver	January 12, 1976
In the series' first "clip show," the gang gets together on Fonzie's birthday to remember certain events in their lives through clips from past episodes.
56	17	"Fonzie the Salesman"	Jerry Paris	Dave Duclon	January 13, 1976
When the garage is taken over by an eccentric new owner, Fonzie does not agree with the new working conditions and resigns. Fonzie is then unable to find another job as a mechanic; but after a pep talk from Howard, he vows to find another career, and takes a job selling encyclopedias door-to-door.
57	18	"Football Frolics"	Jerry Paris	James Ritz	January 20, 1976
Richie, Potsie, and Ralph need some money to buy tickets to a big football game from Arnold. When Howard refuses to loan them the money, Ralph comes up with the idea of volume babysitting to raise the funds. Note: Laverne and Shirley arrive with a kid named "Booker Brown," who was portrayed by actor Kristoff St. John.
58	19	"Fonzie the Superstar"	Jerry Paris	Arthur Silver & Barry Rubinowitz	January 27, 1976
With Potsie out of town, the band has no lead singer for the Saturday Senior Dance, until Ralph informs Arnold that Fonzie could fill in. When Fonzie finds out, he is less than pleased; and worried that he is no Elvis, Fonzie may actually not be good at something for once. Notes: Laverne and Shirley sing backup for Fonzie on his rendition of "Heartbreak Hotel". This episode originally aired on the same night that Laverne & Shirley debuted on ABC. Also, this episode marks the final appearance of "Sticks" Downey (Jack Baker). Side note: Although set in the 1950s, the costume Fonzie wears during his "Heartbreak Hotel" performance is an obvious play on the stage jumpsuits that Elvis Presley wore when touring and playing in Vegas in the 1970s. The Cunninghams plan to see the movie Psycho which was released in 1960.
59	20	"Two Angry Men"	Jerry Paris	Joe Glauberg	February 3, 1976
When a blizzard hits Milwaukee; the weight of Fonzie's new pigeon coop, combined with that of the snow, causes the roof to collapse. Howard and Fonzie argue over who should pay for the damage, and end up facing each other in court.
60	21	"Beauty Contest"	Jerry Paris	William S. Bickley & Michael Warren	February 10, 1976
Tired of dating average girls; Richie, Potsie, and Ralph--with help from Fonzie--sponsor a beauty contest as a scheme to meet and become involved with more sophisticated girls; but trouble ensues when the fake winner doesn't show up, leaving the boys unable to deliver the promised, non-existent prize (a trip to Hollywood) to the actual winner.
61	22	"Bringing Up Spike"	Jerry Paris	Joe Glauberg	February 17, 1976
Fonzie finds himself playing father figure when his young cousin Spike comes to stay, but soon regrets not following Howard's advice about laying down ground rules when Spike is caught as one of a group of thieves stealing from the cash register at Arnold's. Note: Fonzie and Spike's kinship is further explained. Howard mistakenly thinks that Spike is Fonzie's nephew, as he always refers to Fonzie as "Uncle Fonzie." Fonzie explains that even though he is Spike's cousin, he serves as an uncle to Spike.
62	23	"A Sight for Sore Eyes"	Jerry Paris	Dave Duclon	February 24, 1976
Fonzie is horrified when Ralph's optometrist father tells him that he must wear glasses to prevent the headaches he has been experiencing. A self-conscious Fonzie thinks glasses are uncool and refuses to wear them, so his friends try to make him see the light. Note: Ralph's father, Dr. Mickey Malph (Jack Dodson) makes his debut.
63	24	"Arnold's Wedding"	Frank Buxton	Bob Brunner	March 2, 1976
Arnold announces that he is to marry his pen pal, a woman from Japan (Nobu McCarthy), and asks Fonzie to be his best man. But Fonzie is convinced that the "Fonzarelli Curse" will strike after the previous two weddings he attended ended in disaster, and it starts to seem that the wedding may indeed be doomed when Arnold's bride has second thoughts. Note: This episode marks the final appearance of Pat Morita in his role of Arnold, until appearing as a guest star in 1977 and 1979 before returning in Season 10 as a recurring character after Al Molinaro departed in 1982.
