= Happy Days season 8 =

Season 8 of the television series Happy Days

Happy Days
- Season 8
- No. of episodes: 22

Release
- Original network: ABC
- Original release: November 11, 1980 – May 26, 1981

Season chronology
- ← Previous; Season 7 Next → Season 9

This is a list of episodes from the eighth season of Happy Days.

== Main cast ==
- Henry Winkler as Arthur "Fonzie" Fonzarelli
- Marion Ross as Marion Cunningham
- Anson Williams as Warren "Potsie" Weber
- Erin Moran as Joanie Cunningham
- Al Molinaro as Alfred "Al" Delvecchio
- Scott Baio as Chachi Arcola
- Lynda Goodfriend as Lori Beth Allen Cunningham
- Tom Bosley as Howard Cunningham

== Guest stars ==
- Cathy Silvers as Jenny Piccalo
- Ted McGinley as Roger Phillips
- Ellen Travolta as Louisa Arcola
- Denis Mandel as Eugene Belvin
- Harris Kal as Bobby
- Kevin Sullivan as Tommy

== Broadcast history ==
The season aired Tuesdays at 8:00-8:30 pm (EST).

== Episodes ==
No. overall	No. in season	Title	Directed by	Written by	Original release date
168	1	"No Tell Motel"	Jerry Paris	Lesa Kite & Cindy Begel	November 11, 1980
Joanie and Chachi sneak off without permission to a Beach Boys concert in Chicago, but they get in over their heads when Chachi's car breaks down and they get stuck in a motel together. Notes: This was the first appearance of Jenny Piccalo
169	2	"Live and Learn"	Jerry Paris	Fred Fox, Jr.	November 18, 1980
Fonzie becomes a shop teacher at Jefferson High School and has to adjust to being an authority figure. He also experiments with growing a beard. Notes: Although out of order, this was actually the first episode produced for the season, establishing Henry Winkler (Fonzie) as the sole star with the departure of Ron Howard (Richie). Also, this episode also marks the first appearances of Denis Mandel as Eugene Belvin and Harris Kal as Bobby.
170	3	"Dreams Can Come True"	Jerry Paris	Ria Nepus	November 25, 1980
Marion becomes a contestant on a game show in order to help Lori Beth win a trip to Greenland to marry Richie. Guest starring Lyle Waggoner.
171	4	"Hello, Roger"	Jerry Paris	William Bickley & Michael Warren	December 2, 1980
Richie's cousin Roger Phillips moves in and takes a teaching job at Jefferson High School alongside Fonzie. Note: First appearance of Ted McGinley as Roger Phillips, Marion's nephew.
172	5	"Joanie Gets Wheels"	Jerry Paris	Dave Ketchum & Tony Di Marco	December 9, 1980
Tired of being a pedestrian on dates, Joanie disobeys Howard and buys a car of her own, only to find out that hiding a car is too difficult to handle. Side note: When Howard and Marion go to see the film The Music Man, Marion claims the little red-haired boy in the movie poster reminds her of Richie. This was an inside joke, since as an 8-year-old, Ron Howard starred in the movie, and is actually the boy on the poster.
173	6	"White Christmas"	Jerry Paris	Holly White & Stephanie Garman	December 16, 1980
It's Christmas Eve, and a bickering Howard and Joanie are snowed in at the hardware store; as are Fonzie, Roger, Potsie, Chachi, and Jenny at Arnold's. In the end, however, everyone makes it back to the Cunninghams' and is delighted to hear from Richie.
174	7	"And the Winner Is..."	Jerry Paris	Bosco McGowan	December 30, 1980
Fonzie and another teacher compete for "Teacher of the Year." Note: First appearance of Kevin Rodney Sullivan as Tommy. Absent: Lynda Goodfriend as Lori Beth.
175	8	"If You Only Knew Rosa"	Jerry Paris	Ria Nepus	January 6, 1981
After twenty years, Al reunites with his great lost love. Absent: Marion Ross as Marion Cunningham; Anson Williams as Potsie Weber.
176	9	"The Sixth Sense"	Jerry Paris	Fred Fox, Jr.	January 13, 1981
When Fonzie wrecks his motorcycle; Joanie, Chachi, and Jenny steal Fonzie's money to buy him a new one for his birthday.
177	10	"It Only Hurts When I Smile"	Jerry Paris	Barry Rubinowitz	January 27, 1981
Fonzie has a toothache but refuses to go to the dentist.
178	11	"Welcome to My Nightmare" "Horror Show"	Jerry Paris	Mark Rothman	February 3, 1981
After a day of granting favors for his friends, an exhausted Fonzie falls asleep watching a horror movie and dreams that a mad scientist (Dick Gautier) has stolen his cool. Absent: Lynda Goodfriend as Lori Beth.
179	12	"Broadway It's Not" "Chachi Sings, A Star Is Born"	Jerry Paris	James P. Dunne & Barry O'Brien	February 10, 1981
Chachi flies into a jealous rage when he sees Joanie kissing her co-star in the school play, leading to a falling out between them. Guest Star: Larry Anderson. Note: In the school play, Scott Baio and Erin Moran, in their respective roles of Chachi and Joanie, perform "You Look at Me", which later became the theme song of Joanie Loves Chachi.
180	13	"Bride and Gloom" "Fonzie and Jenny Married"	Jerry Paris	Mel Sherer & Steve Grant	February 17, 1981
Joanie asks Fonzie to be Jenny's date for a masquerade ball held on a ship, where they dress as a bride and groom. But after staging a mock wedding ceremony out at sea with the ship's captain dressed as a priest, the couple learns they may actually be married. Love-starved as always, Jenny takes advantage of the situation religiously, and moves into Fonzie's apartment and redecorates it to her liking. However, Jenny is later disappointed when proof is presented that she and Fonzie aren't married after all. Absent: Lynda Goodfriend as Lori Beth.
181	14	"Hello, Mrs. Arcola" "Chachi's House"	Jerry Paris	William Bickley & Michael Warren	February 24, 1981
Ashamed of his eccentric family and being poor, Chachi is reluctant to invite Joanie over to meet his mother. Because of this, Joanie begins to think he is ashamed of her; so Fonzie comes to the rescue: He invites the Cunninghams to get together for dinner at the Arcolas' home with Chachi's mother. Note: First appearance of Ellen Travolta as Louisa Arcola, who would reprise the role on Joanie Loves Chachi. Absent: Lynda Goodfriend as Lori Beth.
182	15	"Fonzie Gets Shot"	Jerry Paris	Bob Howard	March 3, 1981
In a Rashomon takeoff, when Fonzie is injured (shot in the buttocks) during a camping trip (presumably, by Potsie), everyone tells a different version of what happened. Absent: Lynda Goodfriend as Lori Beth.
183	16	"Potsie on His Own"	Jerry Paris	Holly White	March 17, 1981 (Note: This episode was originally scheduled to air on January 20, 1981, but was preempted due to news coverage of the return of former American hostages in Iran.)
After falling behind on rent, Potsie is forced to move back in with his parents. When he learns that Lori Beth's roommate likes men who live alone; Potsie remains in the apartment, but he doesn't reveal to Fonzie how he is earning quick cash to pay his rent. Side note: Curiously, this is the only episode of the series that isn't Copyrighted by Paramount Pictures Corporation. The closing credits read, "Copyright 1981 by Barclay's Mercantile Industrial Finance Co." This is the company that produced the Paramount film Reds, directed by and starring Warren Beatty.
184	17	"Tall Story"	Jerry Paris	Barry Rubinowitz	April 7, 1981
Chachi vouches for an epileptic classmate to play basketball for the high school team.
185	18	"Scholarship"	Jerry Paris	Mark Rothman	April 14, 1981
Chachi is offered a sports scholarship from a Florida college, but Fonzie suspects it is not bona fide.
186	19	"R.C. & L.B Forever"	Jerry Paris	Fred Fox, Jr.	May 5, 1981
Richie and Lori Beth finally get married. But because Lori Beth isn't allowed on the Army base where Richie is stationed because she and Richie aren't yet married; Richie and Lori Beth decide to get married over the telephone with Fonzie standing in as proxy for Richie.
187	20	"Howard's Bowling Buddy" "Howard's Girlfriend"	Jerry Paris	Bob Howard	May 12, 1981
Marion becomes jealous over Howard's new female bowling partner (Patricia Carr, Tom Bosley's wife).
188	21	"Mother and Child Reunion"	Jerry Paris	Fred Fox, Jr. & Babaloo Mandel	May 19, 1981
Fonzie takes his auto shop students on a field trip and, during a stop at a diner, he encounters a waitress (Janis Paige) whom he believes may be his long-lost mother. Absent: Erin Moran as Joanie Cunningham;
189	22	"American Musical"	Jerry Paris	James P. Dunne & Elizabeth Bradley	May 26, 1981
Fonzie helps Chachi study American history, illustrated by dream sequences featuring seven educational musical numbers.
