= Happy Days season 7 =

Season 7 of the television series Happy Days

Happy Days
- Season 7
- No. of episodes: 25

Release
- Original network: ABC
- Original release: September 11, 1979 – May 6, 1980

Season chronology
- ← Previous; Season 6 Next → Season 8

This is a list of episodes from the seventh season of Happy Days.

== Main cast ==
- Ron Howard as Richie Cunningham
- Henry Winkler as Arthur "Fonzie" Fonzarelli
- Marion Ross as Marion Cunningham
- Anson Williams as Warren "Potsie" Weber
- Don Most as Ralph Malph
- Erin Moran as Joanie Cunningham
- Al Molinaro as Alfred "Al" Delvecchio
- Scott Baio as Chachi Arcola
- Tom Bosley as Howard Cunningham

== Guest stars ==
- Lynda Goodfriend as Lori Beth Allen
- Ed Peck as Officer Kirk
- Jack Dodson as Dr. Mickey Malph
- Penny Marshall as Laverne De Fazio
- Cindy Williams as Shirley Feeney
- Jimmy Brogan as Random

== Broadcast history ==
The season aired Tuesdays at 8:00–8:30 pm (EST).

== Episodes ==
No. overall	No. in season	Title	Directed by	Written by	Original release date
143	1	"Shotgun Wedding: Part 1"	Jerry Paris	Fred Fox, Jr.	September 11, 1979
The gang visits a farm, where Richie and Fonzie romance the very strict farmer's daughters and get themselves in a jam. Note: In its original airing, this episode was the first part of a two-part crossover with Laverne & Shirley. For syndication, an alternate ending, in lieu of the original cliffhanger ending, was filmed. In fact, many local stations skipped this episode altogether from their syndication schedule, as they didn't have the rights to Laverne & Shirley.
144	2	"Chachi Sells His Soul"	Jerry Paris	Walter Kempley	September 18, 1979
Feeling that the guys treat him like a kid, Chachi falls asleep in a booth at Arnold's, and has a dream that he sells his soul to the devil's nephew. Note: This episode featured Jimmy Brogan as Random the Guardian Angel from the 1979 television series Out of the Blue.
145	3	"Fonzie Meets Kat"	Jerry Paris	Dave Ketchum & Tony Di Marco	September 25, 1979
The gang needs help in a big bar fight, but Fonzie has vowed not to engage in violence for 24 hours. Fonzie meets the mysterious Kat Mandu (Deborah Pratt). Note: A spinoff pilot was written for the role of Kat, but it wasn't picked up and therefore never evolved.
146	4	"Marion Goes to Jail"	Jerry Paris	Barbara Berkowitz	October 2, 1979
Marion crashes Howard's beloved DeSoto into Arnold's and ends up behind bars. Meanwhile, Al tries to find a way to keep the cold out of Arnold's. Note: Ed Peck returns as Officer Kirk.
147	5	"Richie's Job"	Jerry Paris	Terry Hart	October 9, 1979
In hopes of working his way up the corporate ladder as a writer, Richie takes a loading dock job at the local newspaper and learns about life on the other side. Note: Although out of order, this episode was the first episode of the season produced. Happy Days and ABC's other regular programs were not scheduled to air on this night because the network was slated to broadcast Game 1 of the 1979 World Series. However, when rain and snow flurries delayed the start of the game in Baltimore (it was ultimately postponed until the following night), ABC opted for an impromptu first-run airing of this episode.
148	6	"Richie Falls in Love"	Jerry Paris	Ria Nepus	October 23, 1979
Richie decides he needs to grow up, and tries to fulfill that decision by romancing an older woman.
149	7	"Fonzie's a Thespian"	Jerry Paris	Holly White	October 30, 1979
When Marion needs a male lead in her community production of "The Rainmaker," only Fonzie can fit the bill. Guest Star: Terry McGovern
150	8	"Burlesque"	Jerry Paris	Dave Ketchum & Tony Di Marco	November 6, 1979
When the performers don't show up for Howard's Leopard Lodge Fundraiser, the gang must step in and take over the show.
151	9	"Joanie Busts Out"	Jerry Paris	Beverly Bloomberg	November 13, 1979
Chachi gets a job as a photographer's assistant, and panics when he finds out that Joanie will be one of the models appearing without clothes. Guest starring: Rhonda Shear. Absent: Al Molinaro as Al Delvecchio.
152	10	"King Richard's Big Night"	Jerry Paris	James P. Dunne	November 20, 1979
At a college party, Richie is crowned King of the Delta Gammas, but loses control after a troublemaking frat boy nicknamed Bullfrog (Gary Epp) slips a Mickey Finn into his drink behind his back. After his friends turn against him because of his behavior at the party, Richie seeks Fonzie's help to expose Bullfrog and bust him for getting Richie in trouble. Absent: Al Molinaro as Al Delvecchio.
153	11	"Fonzie vs. The She-Devils"	Jerry Paris	Sam Greenbaum	November 27, 1979
Richie, Potsie, and Ralph go to a party with a girl biker gang, and discover that they have kidnapped Chachi and are planning to shave his head. Fonzie comes to the rescue posing as a nerd.
154	12	"The Mechanic"	Jerry Paris	Fred Fox, Jr.	December 4, 1979
Fonzie's new assistant (Jim Knaub) at the garage is handicapped and uses a wheelchair, and has a very bad attitude about it.
155	13	"They're Closing Inspiration Point"	Jerry Paris	Beverly Bloomberg	December 11, 1979
The gang protests to save Inspiration Point from development—and it turns out that Howard is behind the development project.
156	14	"Here Comes the Bride Again"	Jerry Paris	Bob Howard	December 18, 1979
Howard and Marion decide to renew their wedding vows. Special Guest stars: Bob and Ray.
157	15	"Ah, Wilderness"	Jerry Paris	Barry Rubinowitz	January 8, 1980
Richie's promise to show the gang a great time in the outdoors does not go according to plan. Note: Ron Howard nearly got his foot broken when the rock hit him. Side note: This episode marks the network television acting debut of actress and comedian Julie Brown.
158	16	"Joanie's Dilemma"	Jerry Paris	April Kelly	January 15, 1980
Joanie debates whether or not to visit Inspiration Point's "Alamo" with her new boyfriend (Michael Dudikoff). Side note: The original prints for this episode indicated that the episode was written by April Clough. This was later changed on request from the writer and now appears in all subsequent prints of the episode.
159	17	"Hot Stuff"	Jerry Paris	Fred Fox, Jr.	January 22, 1980
When Chachi is left in charge of closing Arnold's for the night, he gets distracted after he finally (after years of trying) convinces Joanie to go on a date with him. Overwhelmed with joy, Chachi inadvertently leaves his apron on a hot grill as he leaves Arnold's, causing the restaurant to go up in flames. As the blaze spreads, Fonzie, Potsie, and Ralph get trapped in the restroom, but are rescued by Richie and Lori Beth who use their car to break open the gated window. The next day, as the gang surveys the completely destroyed Arnold's, Chachi admits that it was his irresponsibility that caused the disaster, which infuriates Fonzie. However, in the end, Fonzie offers his life savings to Al, volunteering to become Al's business partner as they set out to rebuild a more modern Arnold's. Note: This storyline was part of a decision by producers Garry Marshall and Lowell Ganz that the old '50s-style Arnold's was no longer appealing enough to teen audiences; it was burned down, so it could be replaced with a more modern '60s-style restaurant, set to coincide with the show's passage from the 1950s to the 1960s.
160	18	"The New Arnold's"	Jerry Paris	Holly White	January 29, 1980
With insurance money and Fonzie's life savings now in hand, Al begins to rebuild Arnold's, and considers Fonzie as a business partner. (In fact, Al and Fonzie name the new drive-in "Fonzie's & Big Al's" for a while before reverting it back to "Arnold's".) But being partners in the newly rebuilt restaurant is harder than they expected. Note: This episode unveils the new Arnold's '60s set, which would be used for the remainder of the series' run, as well as a new "office" in the men's room for Fonzie, complete with a desk and telephone.
161	19	"The Hucksters"	Jerry Paris	Mark Rothman	February 5, 1980
Howard explores television advertising to boost business for the hardware store. Special Guest star: Hank Aaron as himself.
162	20	"Allison"	Jerry Paris	Harriett Weiss & Patt Shea	February 12, 1980
Fonzie dates a deaf girl, and Richie thinks he is leading her on. Even so, Fonzie thinks she may be "the one". Guest stars: Linda Bove as Allison and Richard Masur as Doug.
163	21	"Fools Rush In"	Jerry Paris	Beverly Bloomberg	February 26, 1980
Joanie and Chachi finally go on their first date, but the kids whom Joanie is babysitting that night keep getting in the way.
164	22	"Father & Son"	Jerry Paris	Fred Fox, Jr.	March 4, 1980
Howard decides he wants to get to know Richie better, and takes him along on a Lodge weekend in Chicago.
165	23	"A Potsie Is Born"	Jerry Paris	Ria Nepus	March 11, 1980
Potsie is offered a lucrative singing contract by a manipulative promoter, and the fame goes to his head. Guest stars: Pat Crowley as Susan Patterson, Gail Edwards as Loretta and Arthur Batanides as Eddie. Note: Although out of order, this episode was the last episode of the season produced.
166	24	"The Roaring Twenties"	Jerry Paris	Dave Ketchum & Tony Di Marco	March 25, 1980
Richie asks his great-uncle to review his report on the 1920s. In turn, he spins for Richie a tale of the family's activities during prohibition. Special Guest star: Pat O'Brien.
167	25	"Ralph's Family Problem"	Jerry Paris	Dave Ketchum & Tony Di Marco	May 6, 1980
Ralph is shocked to learn his parents are divorcing. Notes: This episode marks the final regular appearances of Ron Howard and Donny Most as Richie Cunningham and Ralph Malph, respectively, on the series. Also, this episode was shot prior to "Hot Stuff", since the Arnold's scenes take place in the original Arnold's set.
