= Happy Days season 4 =

Season 4 of the television series Happy Days

Happy Days
- Season 4
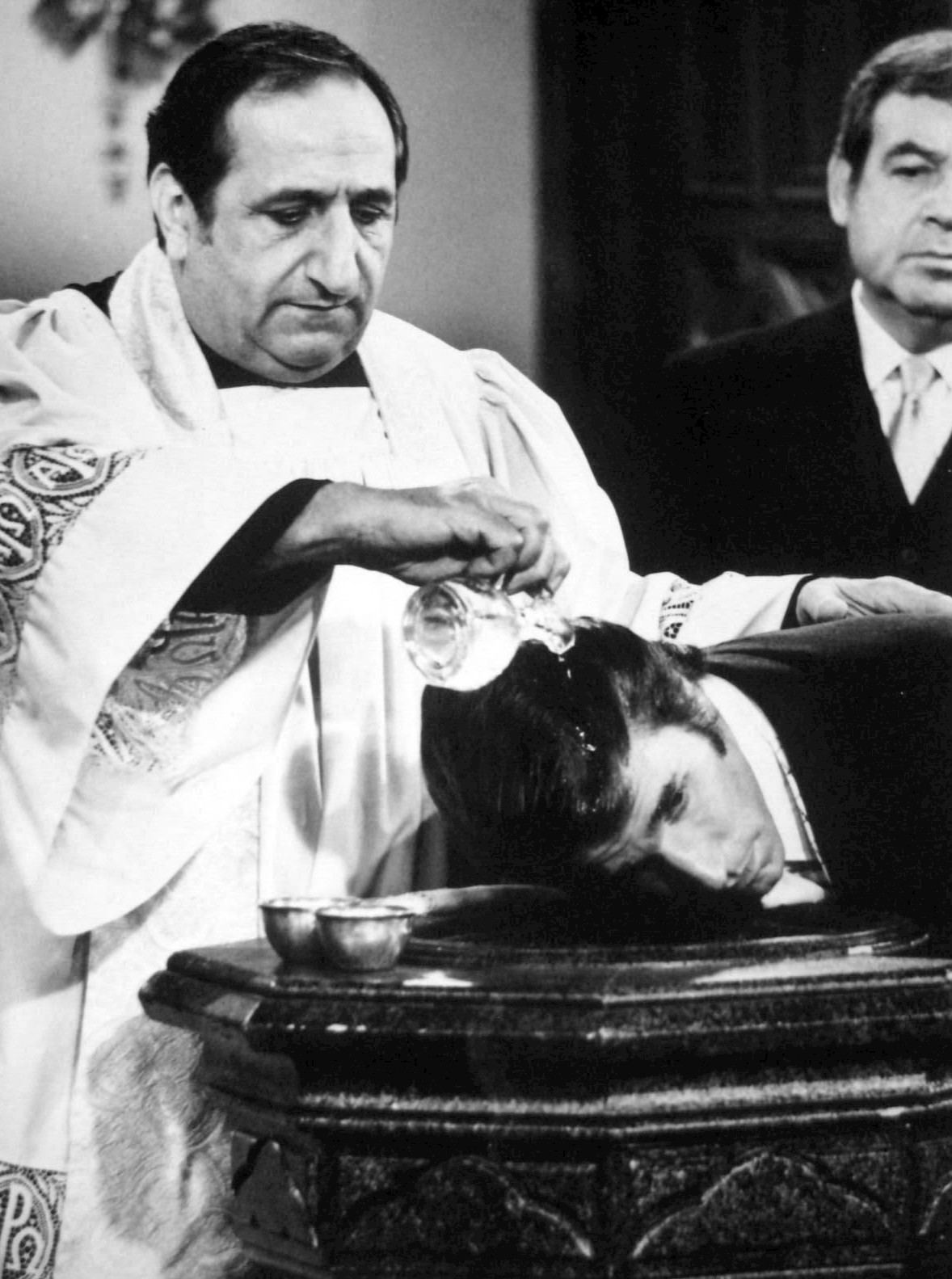
- Al Molinaro, Henry Winkler, and Tom Bosley in the episode, "Fonzie's Baptism"
- No. of episodes: 25

Release
- Original network: ABC
- Original release: September 21, 1976 – March 29, 1977

Season chronology
- ← Previous; Season 3 Next → Season 5

This is a list of episodes from the fourth season of Happy Days.

== Cast ==
=== Main ===
- Ron Howard as Richie Cunningham
- Henry Winkler as Arthur "Fonzie" Fonzarelli
- Marion Ross as Marion Cunningham
- Anson Williams as Warren "Potsie" Weber
- Don Most as Ralph Malph
- Erin Moran as Joanie Cunningham
- Tom Bosley as Howard Cunningham

=== Guests ===
- Al Molinaro as Alfred "Al" Delvecchio
- Jack Dodson and Alan Oppenheimer as Dr. Mickey Malph
- Ed Peck as Officer Kirk,
- Roz Kelly as Pinky Tuscadero
- Conrad Janis as Mr. Kendall
- Charlene Tilton as Jill
- Lynda Goodfriend as Kim
- Nancy Walker as Nancy Blansky
- Danny Butch as Spike
- Pat Morita as Arnold
- Eddie Mekka as Carmine Ragusa
- Paul Linke as Bruiser
- Michael Pataki as Myron "Count" Malachi
- Ken Lerner as Rocco Malachi

== Broadcast history ==
The season originally aired Tuesdays at 8:00-8:30 pm (EST).

== Episodes ==
- Consisted of 25 episodes airing on ABC.
- Recurring Character Debuts: Al Delveccio (Al Molinaro).

No. overall	No. in season	Title	Directed by	Written by	Original release date
64	1	"Fonzie Loves Pinky: Part 1 Fonzie Loves Pinky: Part 2"	Jerry Paris	Arthur Silver	September 21, 1976
65	2	"Fonzie Loves Pinky: Part 1 Fonzie Loves Pinky: Part 2"	Jerry Paris	Arthur Silver	September 21, 1976
Fonzie's old flame Pinky Tuscadero (Roz Kelly) returns, and the couple starts to rekindle their relationship. Meanwhile, Fonzie is planning to compete in an upcoming demolition derby; but when his co-driver is injured before the event, Pinky resents Fonzie's disapproval of a woman driving in a derby and chooses Ralph over her for a replacement. To make matters worse, the ruthless Malachi brothers (Ken Lerner and Michael Pataki) intend to win the derby, using any dirty trick necessary including their infamous "Malachi Crunch." Note: This episode marks the first appearance of Al Delvecchio (Al Molinaro), who takes over as the new owner of Arnold's Drive-In. In 2009, TV Guide ranked this episode (along with part three) #87 on its list of the 100 Greatest Episodes.
66	3	"Fonzie Loves Pinky: Part 3"	Jerry Paris	Joe Glauberg	September 28, 1976
With Pinky injured and out of the demolition derby by the Malachi Brothers, Fonzie is left to fend for himself; but he has more than just beating the Malachis on his mind--he wants to marry Pinky. Note: The character of Pinky Tuscadero was to be written into the series as Fonzie's new long-term girlfriend; but due to disagreements between Roz Kelly and the producers, this three-part episode marked the character's only appearance in the series. In 2009, TV Guide ranked this episode (along with parts one and two) #87 on its list of the 100 Greatest Episodes.
67	4	"A Mind of His Own" "A Mind of Their Own"	Jerry Paris	Jack Winter	October 5, 1976
When Fonzie gets in his eighth fight over the course of only a week, Howard suggests that he visit a psychologist (Bill Idelson), who comes up with an unusual way for Fonzie to vent his aggression--building bird houses.
68	5	"Fonzie the Father"	Jerry Paris	Marty Nadler	October 19, 1976
With the rest of the Cunningham family away on vacation, Richie plans a party. But when heavily pregnant Louisa, the wife of an old friend of Fonzie's, arrives on the scene, Richie and Fonzie find themselves hosting an expectant houseguest.
69	6	"Fonzie's Hero"	Jerry Paris	Story by : Steven Dworman; Teleplay by : Barry Rubinowitz	October 26, 1976
After Potsie rescues Fonzie from a fire at the garage, Fonzie informs Potsie that he can have anything he wants. Potsie wants only one thing: for Fonzie to be his best friend, and to do everything with him—including rollerskating.
70	7	"A Place of His Own"	Jerry Paris	Bill Idelson	November 9, 1976
With Richie, Ralph, and Potsie all cramming into Richie's car, each with his respective date, Richie feels it is cramping his chances romantically; so he and Fonzie come up with a scheme for him to use Fonzie's apartment for an evening to try to woo an art student. Note: The role of Mr. Kendall, the art student's father, is played by Conrad Janis, who would go on to play Mindy's father Fred McConnell (a somewhat similar character) in the Happy Days spin-off Mork & Mindy.
71	8	"They Shoot Fonzies, Don't They?"	Jerry Paris	Steve Zacharias	November 16, 1976
When Joanie is cut from the cheerleading squad, she persuades Fonzie to help her retaliate by being her partner in a dance marathon to win a bet with Jill (Charlene Tilton), the head cheerleader and Joanie's rival who bumped her from the squad. But after Fonzie's bike breaks down and he has to push it twelve miles home, will he be able to summon the stamina to see the marathon through? Note: Charlene Tilton portrays cheerleading rival Jill. Additionally, the title of this episode is a spoof of the movie They Shoot Horses, Don't They? which is about a dance marathon.
72	9	"The Muckrakers"	Jerry Paris	Alan Mandel & Charles Shyer	November 23, 1976
When Potsie breaks a tooth eating meatloaf at the school cafeteria, Richie goes undercover to conduct an investigation for the school newspaper on the poor kitchen conditions, with a little help from Fonzie. But when Richie's story is a big success, he plans to do a follow-up report, including how Fonzie has a phobia of liver. After Richie refuses Fonzie's request that he not mention it in the report, the two fall out and stop talking to each other. By the episode's end, Fonzie conquers his fear by successfully eating a plate of liver. Guest stars: Arthur Batanides as Louie and Robert Ball as Curly.
73	10	"a.k.a. The Fonz"	Jerry Paris	Brian Levant	November 30, 1976
Officer Kirk has been appointed acting sheriff, and his first task is to run what he considers to be hoodlums out of town—and Fonzie is on his list. Kirk starts to make life very difficult for Fonzie's friends as they try to find a solution to the situation. Note: Ralph's optometrist father Dr. Mickey Malph returns in this episode; unlike his previous appearance, however, he is portrayed here for the first and only time by Alan Oppenheimer.
74	11	"Richie Branches Out"	Jerry Paris	James Ritz	December 7, 1976
A couple of weeks before Christmas, Richie falls in love with a model on a cola advertising poster. The gang then pretends to be filming a commercial in order for Richie to try to meet her.
75	12	"Fonzie's Old Lady"	Jerry Paris	Marty Nadler	January 4, 1977
Richie discovers that Fonzie is dating an attractive older woman (Diana Hyland). What Fonzie doesn't know is that the woman is married.
76	13	"Time Capsule"	Jerry Paris	Dave Ketchum & Tony Di Marco	January 11, 1977
Richie, Potsie, and Ralph are designing a time capsule for a project, and put it in a vault at Howard's hardware store. However, when the three go to visit the capsule with their girlfriends, they find themselves—and Fonzie—locked in. It's Friday, and the vault will not be opened until Monday. Note: In this episode, Richie has a girlfriend named Kim, played by Lynda Goodfriend. She is also Ralph's prom date in "Graduation: Part 1" later in the season. She would return in the fifth season as Richie's steady girlfriend (and later his fiancee and wife) Lori Beth.
77	14	"The Book of Records"	Jerry Paris	Michael Weinberger & Yvette Weinberger	January 18, 1977
In a scheme to win free publicity for Arnold's, Al offers a $100 prize for anyone who can get into the Magilla Book of Records, and the gang all come up with various ideas of records to break. Meanwhile, Fonzie tries to find work for his well-meaning but clumsy cousin Angie (Charles Galioto), but he fails at every job. But even so, perhaps there is a record that Angie can break! Notes: This episode marks the final appearance of "Bag" Zombrowski (Neil J. Schwartz). At the beginning of the episode, a reference was made to the two-part "Fearless Fonzarelli" episode from Season 3, when Al asks Fonzie to jump barrels on his motorcycle like he did on "that TV show" ("You Wanted to See It") so the stunt can be added to the Magilla Book of Records. Fonzie declines, claiming that his stunting days were over.
78	15	"A Shot in the Dark"	Jerry Paris	Story by : Steve Zacharias; Teleplay by : Fred Fox, Jr.	January 25, 1977
During a big basketball game, the star player is injured and Richie is put into the game to replace him. After he scores the winning basket, he becomes an overnight local hero and a big hit with the girls. But plans are afoot from the opposition to see that he doesn't follow up his success in the forthcoming championship game. Note: After Richie misses what would have been the game-winning free throw shot, Howard consoles him and delivers the closing line of the episode to Richie: "Here, have a Life Saver. It'll make you feel better," a nod to the Life Savers commercials that aired during the 1970s. Fonzie saves Richie from bullies and shows his power by breaking the restrooms at Arnolds, wrapping the Jukebox and attracting a woman, all in one scene.
79	16	"Marion Rebels"	Jerry Paris	Dixie Brown Grossman	February 1, 1977
Marion becomes frustrated by her life as a housewife and has a falling out with Howard. Encouraged by Fonzie, she lands a job working as a waitress at Arnold's. But after she insults Al's menu and interferes with people's orders (specifically, advising the kids against junk food in favor of healthy eating), Fonzie calls a meeting and insists something should be done about it.
80	17	"The Third Anniversary Show"	Jerry Paris	Bob Brunner & Arthur Silver	February 4, 1977
Richie, Joanie, and the gang prepare to throw a party for Marion in honor of hers and Howard's wedding anniversary. While doing so, they remember certain events through clips from past episodes. Note: Nancy Walker guest stars as Nancy Blanksy, Howard's cousin who was the main character of Blansky's Beauties.
81	18	"Graduation: Part 1"	Jerry Paris	Calvin Kelly	February 8, 1977
Marion lets slip to Richie, Potsie, and Ralph that Fonzie had been going to night school so that he can graduate with his friends. Fonzie is upset with Marion for letting his secret out, but that turns out to be the least of the group's worries when the assistant principal delivers some shocking news--the whole class will not graduate unless they retake a final exam that everyone failed, thereby forcing the class to study all night following the prom. Note: Anson Williams, in his role of Potsie, performs the song "Deeply," which reached #93 on the Billboard Hot 100 chart in April 1977.
82	19	"Graduation: Part 2"	Jerry Paris	William S. Bickley & Michael Warren	February 15, 1977
The gang studies through the night in order to retake their exams and graduate. But Fonzie gets some disappointing news when he finds that since he was a night school student, he wouldn't be allowed to participate in the graduation commencement ceremony. Notes: Pat Morita returns in his role of Arnold as a special guest in this episode. Danny Butch also makes his final appearance in his role of Spike.
83	20	"The Physical"	Jerry Paris	Dave Ketchum & Tony Di Marco	February 22, 1977
Richie, Potsie, and Ralph each receive letters instructing them to attend a physical to evaluate them for the Army draft. They are surprised when Fonzie is also called up—but he is more interested in the physical nurse than doing push-ups. Note: Warren Berlinger and Linda Kaye Henning guest star as the Army instructor and physical nurse, respectively.
84	21	"Joanie's Weird Boyfriend"	Jerry Paris	Bob Brunner	March 1, 1977
Feeling like she's being treated as a little kid, Joanie jumps at the chance when she is invited to be initiated into a troublesome gang called the Red Devils. But does she know what she has gotten herself into? Note: Eddie Mekka appears in his role of Carmine Ragusa from the Happy Days spin-off Laverne & Shirley.
85	22	"Fonz-How, Inc."	Jerry Paris	Joe Glauberg	March 8, 1977
Howard has come up with the idea for an invention that he calls the "Garbage Gulper" (a portable trash compactor), and Fonzie is convinced to become his partner and help construct their prototype. They have high hopes for the invention, but will the corporate world prove to be as lucrative as they hope?
86	23	"Spunky Come Home"	Jerry Paris	Arthur Silver & Fred Fox, Jr.	March 15, 1977
Fonzie gets a pet dog that he names "Spunky" to keep him company. But Ralph and Potsie accidentally let Spunky escape and make up a story about the dog being stolen to cover their mistake, thereby protecting themselves from a very upset Fonzie.
87	24	"The Last of the Big Time Malphs"	Jerry Paris	Joe Glauberg	March 22, 1977
Ralph is taking huge bets on an upcoming sporting event whose outcome he feels sure of. But when the results are in, and they are the opposite of what he predicted, he is left owing a lot of people some serious money—including a local thug named Bruiser. Note: Jack Dodson returns as Ralph's father, Dr. Mickey Malph.
88	25	"Fonzie's Baptism"	Jerry Paris	William S. Bickley & Michael Warren	March 29, 1977
After nearly being killed in a stock-car race, Fonzie questions his mortality. Al suggests that he go to see his brother, a Catholic priest, for guidance, leading Fonzie to decide to be baptized. Notes: This episode introduces Al's twin brother Father Anthony (Al Molinaro in a dual role), a Catholic priest. Also, Marion refers to Richie as hers and Howard's firstborn child, thus ignoring the existence of Chuck who appeared in eleven episodes of the first two seasons. There was also a cutscene of the outside of Anthony's church that clearly shows a 70's car drive past.
