= Joanie Cunningham =

Fictional character

Joanie Louise Cunningham
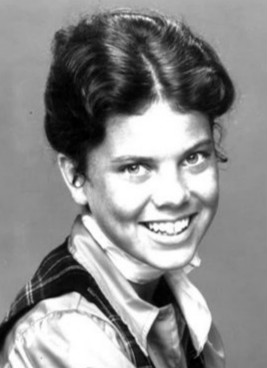
- Erin Moran as Joanie Cunningham in 1976
- First appearance: "Love and the Happy Days"
- Last appearance: "Passages, Part 2"
- Created by: Garry Marshall
- Portrayed by: Erin Moran; Susan Neher (Love, American Style episode)

In-universe information
- Nickname: Shortcake
- Gender: Female
- Family: Marion Cunningham (mother); Howard Cunningham (father); Richie Cunningham (brother); Chuck Cunningham (brother)
- Spouse: Chachi Arcola
- Relatives: Roger Phillips (cousin)

Joanie Louise Cunningham is a fictional character, played by Erin Moran on the sitcoms Happy Days and Joanie Loves Chachi. Her first appearance was on one episode of Love, American Style, where she was played by Susan Neher.

The character is the daughter of Howard and Marion Cunningham, and the younger sister of Chuck and Richie Cunningham. In early seasons, Joanie is always nosy toward Richie's makeout sessions with his girlfriends. Also, in early seasons, Joanie is a member of a girl scout-type organization called the "Junior Chipmunks". She develops a brief crush on Potsie after he sings to her (see "They Call It Potsie Love" from Season 3). As she grows older, Joanie becomes best friends with the promiscuous Jenny Piccalo, who is only referred to but not revealed onscreen until Season 8. Joanie always complains and pouts whenever she is sent to her room by her parents for mischief, talking back, or whenever a conversation ensued that her parents didn't want her to hear.

Joanie Cunningham was the quintessential example of the All-American, 1950s teenage girl. Fonzie becomes fond of Joanie, affectionately referring to her as "Shortcake", and, like her brother Richie, Fonzie looks after her well-being. One such notable case occurs in Season 11, when Joanie takes a teaching job at the high school where Fonzie and Roger are faculty members. An obnoxious student tries to hit on her and Fonzie comes to her rescue. There is another related event that occurs in Season 4, when an arrogant classmate of Joanie's beats Joanie out of cheerleading tryouts; and even though Fonzie is overtly tired from pushing his broken-down motorcycle home, he helps Joanie retaliate by beating her cheerleading rival in a dance marathon. Also in Season 4; Fonzie, Richie, Potsie, Ralph, and Carmine Ragusa (from Laverne & Shirley) defend Joanie's honor against a troublesome gang called the Red Devils (see "Joanie's Weird Boyfriend" from that season).

When Chachi comes to town, he develops a huge crush on Joanie, which for a while went unrequited. However, Joanie eventually accepts a date with Chachi, making him so overwhelmed with excitement that he inadvertently sets fire to Arnold's (see "Hot Stuff" from Season 7). A serious relationship develops between the two and episode plots were eventually written revolving around the couple. Joanie and Chachi become aspiring musicians, forming their own band, which leads to their short-lived spin-off series Joanie Loves Chachi. After Joanie Loves Chachi was cancelled, she and Chachi returned to Happy Days and become married in the series finale "Passages" from Season 11.
