= List of Happy Days episodes =

Happy Days is an American television sitcom created by Garry Marshall that originally aired on ABC from January 15, 1974 to July 19, 1984. A total of 255 half-hour episodes were produced, spanning 11 seasons.

== Series overview ==
Season	Episodes	Originally released		Rank	Rating
Season	Episodes	First released	Last released	Rank	Rating
1	16	January 15, 1974	May 7, 1974	16	21.5
2	23	September 10, 1974	May 6, 1975	49	17.5 (Note: Tied with Petrocelli)
3	24	September 9, 1975	March 2, 1976	11	23.9
4	25	September 21, 1976	March 29, 1977	1	31.5
5	27	September 13, 1977	May 30, 1978	2	31.4
6	27	September 5, 1978	May 15, 1979	4	28.5 (Note: Tied with Mork & Mindy)
7	25	September 11, 1979	May 6, 1980	17	21.7
8	22	November 11, 1980	May 26, 1981	15	20.8 (Note: Tied with Too Close for Comfort)
9	22	October 6, 1981	March 23, 1982	18	20.6
10	22	September 28, 1982	March 22, 1983	28	17.4 (Note: Tied with Little House: A New Beginning)
11	22	September 27, 1983	July 19, 1984 (Note: A broadcast date of September 24, 1984, for Fonzie's Spots has not been verified.)	63	13.9

== Episodes ==
=== Season 1 (1974) ===
No. overall	No. in season	Title	Directed by	Written by	Original release date
1	1	"All the Way"	Mel Ferber	Rob Reiner & Philip Mishkin and Garry Marshall	January 15, 1974
2	2	"The Lemon"	Jerry Paris	Dick Bensfield & Perry Grant	January 22, 1974
3	3	"Richie's Cup Runneth Over"	Jerry Paris	William S. Bickley & Bob Brunner	January 29, 1974
4	4	"Guess Who's Coming to Visit?"	Jerry Paris	Lowell Ganz & Mark Rothman	February 5, 1974
5	5	"Hardware Jungle"	Jerry Paris	Frank Buxton & Michael Leeson	February 12, 1974
6	6	"The Deadly Dares"	Herb Wallerstein	Steve Zacharias	February 19, 1974
7	7	"Fonzie Drops In"	Mel Ferber	William S. Bickley & Bob Brunner	February 26, 1974
8	8	"The Skin Game"	Mel Ferber	William S. Bickley	March 5, 1974
9	9	"Breaking Up Is Hard to Do"	Jerry Paris	William S. Bickley	March 12, 1974
10	10	"Give the Band a Hand"	Jerry Paris	Dick Bensfield & Perry Grant	March 26, 1974
11	11	"Because She's There"	Peter Baldwin	Jack Winter	April 2, 1974
12	12	"In the Name of Love"	Don Weis	Jack Winter	April 9, 1974
13	13	"Great Expectations"	Jerry Paris	Story by : Peggy Elliott & Ed Scharlach; Teleplay by : Bob Brunner & Michael Leeson	April 16, 1974
14	14	"The Best Man"	Jerry Paris	Joel Kane	April 23, 1974
15	15	"Knock Around the Block"	Jerry Paris	Ben Joelson & Art Baer	April 30, 1974
16	16	"Be the First on Your Block"	Jerry Paris	Richard Morgan	May 7, 1974

=== Season 2 (1974–75) ===
No. overall	No. in season	Title	Directed by	Written by	Original release date
17	1	"Richie Moves Out"	Jerry Paris	Ben Joelson & Art Baer	September 10, 1974
18	2	"Richie's Car"	Jerry Paris	Bob Brunner & Michael Leeson	September 17, 1974
19	3	"Who's Sorry Now"	Jerry Paris	Michael Leeson	September 24, 1974
20	4	"You Go to My Head"	Jerry London	Phil Mishkin	October 1, 1974
21	5	"R.O.T.C."	Jerry Paris	Mickey Rose	October 8, 1974
22	6	"Haunted"	Garry Marshall	Bruce Shelly & Dave Ketchum	October 29, 1974
23	7	"Wish Upon a Star"	Herb Wallerstein	Dick Bensfield & Perry Grant	November 12, 1974
24	8	"Not With My Sister, You Don't"	Jerry Paris	Dick Bensfield & Perry Grant	November 19, 1974
25	9	"Big Money"	Jerry Paris	Greg Strangis & Jerry Rannow	November 26, 1974
26	10	"A Star is Bored"	Jerry Paris	Bobby Boswell	December 3, 1974
27	11	"Guess Who's Coming to Christmas"	Frank Buxton	Bill Idelson	December 17, 1974
28	12	"Open House"	Jerry Paris	Bill James	January 7, 1975
29	13	"Fonzie's Getting Married"	Jerry Paris	Lowell Ganz & Mark Rothman	January 14, 1975
30	14	"The Cunningham Caper"	George Tyne	Michael Weinberger & James Ritz	January 21, 1975
31	15	"The Not Making of a President"	Jerry Paris	Lloyd Garver & Ken Hecht	January 28, 1975
32	16	"Cruisin'"	Jerry Paris	Ron Friedman	February 11, 1975
33	17	"The Howdy Doody Show"	Jerry Paris	Bob Brunner	February 18, 1975
34	18	"Get a Job"	Jerry Paris	Bill Idelson	February 25, 1975
35	19	"Fonzie Joins the Band"	Frank Buxton	Ben Joelson & Art Baer	March 4, 1975
36	20	"Fish and the Fins"	Jerry Paris	Phil Mishkin	March 11, 1975
37	21	"Richie's Flip Side"	Herb Wallerstein	Greg Strangis & Jerry Rannow	March 18, 1975
38	22	"Kiss Me Sickly"	George Tyne	Story by : Paul Lichtman & Howard Storm; Teleplay by : Michael Weinberger & James Ritz	April 29, 1975
39	23	"Goin' to Chicago"	George Tyne	Frank Buxton	May 6, 1975

=== Season 3 (1975–76) ===
No. overall	No. in season	Title	Directed by	Written by	Original release date
40	1	"Fonzie Moves In"	Jerry Paris	Lowell Ganz & Mark Rothman	September 9, 1975
41	2	"The Motorcycle"	Jerry Paris	William S. Bickley & Michael Warren	September 16, 1975
42	3	"Fearless Fonzarelli: Part 1"	Jerry Paris	Michael Weinberger	September 23, 1975
43	4	"Fearless Fonzarelli: Part 2"	Jerry Paris	Bob Brunner	September 30, 1975
44	5	"The Other Richie Cunningham"	Jerry Paris	Dick Bensfield & Perry Grant	October 7, 1975
45	6	"Richie Fights Back"	Jerry Paris	Arthur Silver	October 14, 1975
46	7	"Jailhouse Rock"	Arthur Fisher	Bob Brunner	October 21, 1975
47	8	"Howard's 45th Fiasco"	Jerry Paris	Frank Buxton	October 28, 1975
48	9	"Fonzie the Flatfoot"	Jerry Paris	Story by : Arthur Silver; Teleplay by : Marty Nadler	November 4, 1975
49	10	"A Date with Fonzie"	Jerry Paris	Lowell Ganz & Mark Rothman	November 11, 1975
50	11	"Three on a Porch"	Jerry Paris	Bobby Boswell & Tiffany York	November 18, 1975
51	12	"Fonzie's New Friend"	Jerry Paris	Sid Arthur & Artie Laing	November 25, 1975
52	13	"They Call It Potsie Love"	Jerry Paris	Marty Nadler	December 2, 1975
53	14	"Tell It to the Marines"	Jerry Paris	Sid Arthur & Artie Laing	December 16, 1975
54	15	"Dance Contest"	Norm Gray	Bob Howard	January 6, 1976
55	16	"The Second Anniversary Show"	Jerry Paris	Bob Brunner & Arthur Silver	January 12, 1976
56	17	"Fonzie the Salesman"	Jerry Paris	Dave Duclon	January 13, 1976
57	18	"Football Frolics"	Jerry Paris	James Ritz	January 20, 1976
58	19	"Fonzie the Superstar"	Jerry Paris	Arthur Silver & Barry Rubinowitz	January 27, 1976
59	20	"Two Angry Men"	Jerry Paris	Joe Glauberg	February 3, 1976
60	21	"Beauty Contest"	Jerry Paris	William S. Bickley & Michael Warren	February 10, 1976
61	22	"Bringing Up Spike"	Jerry Paris	Joe Glauberg	February 17, 1976
62	23	"A Sight for Sore Eyes"	Jerry Paris	Dave Duclon	February 24, 1976
63	24	"Arnold's Wedding"	Frank Buxton	Bob Brunner	March 2, 1976

=== Season 4 (1976–77) ===
No. overall	No. in season	Title	Directed by	Written by	Original release date
64	1	"Fonzie Loves Pinky: Part 1 Fonzie Loves Pinky: Part 2"	Jerry Paris	Arthur Silver	September 21, 1976
65	2	"Fonzie Loves Pinky: Part 1 Fonzie Loves Pinky: Part 2"	Jerry Paris	Arthur Silver	September 21, 1976
66	3	"Fonzie Loves Pinky: Part 3"	Jerry Paris	Joe Glauberg	September 28, 1976
67	4	"A Mind of His Own" "A Mind of Their Own"	Jerry Paris	Jack Winter	October 5, 1976
68	5	"Fonzie the Father"	Jerry Paris	Marty Nadler	October 19, 1976
69	6	"Fonzie's Hero"	Jerry Paris	Story by : Steven Dworman; Teleplay by : Barry Rubinowitz	October 26, 1976
70	7	"A Place of His Own"	Jerry Paris	Bill Idelson	November 9, 1976
71	8	"They Shoot Fonzies, Don't They?"	Jerry Paris	Steve Zacharias	November 16, 1976
72	9	"The Muckrakers"	Jerry Paris	Alan Mandel & Charles Shyer	November 23, 1976
73	10	"a.k.a. The Fonz"	Jerry Paris	Brian Levant	November 30, 1976
74	11	"Richie Branches Out"	Jerry Paris	James Ritz	December 7, 1976
75	12	"Fonzie's Old Lady"	Jerry Paris	Marty Nadler	January 4, 1977
76	13	"Time Capsule"	Jerry Paris	Dave Ketchum & Tony Di Marco	January 11, 1977
77	14	"The Book of Records"	Jerry Paris	Michael Weinberger & Yvette Weinberger	January 18, 1977
78	15	"A Shot in the Dark"	Jerry Paris	Story by : Steve Zacharias; Teleplay by : Fred Fox, Jr.	January 25, 1977
79	16	"Marion Rebels"	Jerry Paris	Dixie Brown Grossman	February 1, 1977
80	17	"The Third Anniversary Show"	Jerry Paris	Bob Brunner & Arthur Silver	February 4, 1977
81	18	"Graduation: Part 1"	Jerry Paris	Calvin Kelly	February 8, 1977
82	19	"Graduation: Part 2"	Jerry Paris	William S. Bickley & Michael Warren	February 15, 1977
83	20	"The Physical"	Jerry Paris	Dave Ketchum & Tony Di Marco	February 22, 1977
84	21	"Joanie's Weird Boyfriend"	Jerry Paris	Bob Brunner	March 1, 1977
85	22	"Fonz-How, Inc."	Jerry Paris	Joe Glauberg	March 8, 1977
86	23	"Spunky Come Home"	Jerry Paris	Arthur Silver & Fred Fox, Jr.	March 15, 1977
87	24	"The Last of the Big Time Malphs"	Jerry Paris	Joe Glauberg	March 22, 1977
88	25	"Fonzie's Baptism"	Jerry Paris	William S. Bickley & Michael Warren	March 29, 1977

=== Season 5 (1977–78) ===
No. overall	No. in season	Title	Directed by	Written by	Original release date
89	1	"Hollywood"	Jerry Paris	Joe Glauberg & Walter Kempley	September 13, 1977
90	2	"Hollywood"	Jerry Paris	Joe Glauberg & Walter Kempley	September 13, 1977
91	3	"Hollywood: Part 3"	Jerry Paris	Fred Fox, Jr.	September 20, 1977
92	4	"Hard Cover"	Jerry Paris	Brian Levant	September 27, 1977
93	5	"My Cousin the Cheat"	Jerry Paris	Walter Kempley	October 4, 1977
94	6	"Fonsillectomy"	Jerry Paris	Marty Nadler	October 25, 1977
95	7	"The Apartment"	Jerry Paris	Dixie Brown Grossman	November 1, 1977
96	8	"Fonzie and Leather Tuscadero: Part 1" "Fonzie - Rock Entrepreneur: Part 1"	Jerry Paris	Bob Brunner	November 8, 1977
97	9	"Fonzie and Leather Tuscadero: Part 2" "Fonzie - Rock Entrepreneur: Part 2"	Jerry Paris	Bob Brunner	November 15, 1977
98	10	"My Fair Fonzie"	Jerry Paris	Warren S. Murray	November 22, 1977
99	11	"Bye Bye Blackball"	Jerry Paris	Barry Rubinowitz	November 29, 1977
100	12	"Requiem for a Malph"	Jerry Paris	Steve Zacharias	December 6, 1977
101	13	"Nose for News"	Jerry Paris	Walter Kempley	December 13, 1977
102	14	"Grandpa's Visit"	Jerry Paris	George F. Slavin	December 20, 1977
103	15	"Potsie Gets Pinned"	Jerry Paris	Fred Fox, Jr.	January 10, 1978
104	16	"Joanie's First Kiss"	Jerry Paris	Barbara O'Keefe	January 17, 1978
105	17	"Marion's Misgivings"	Jerry Paris	Fred Maio	January 24, 1978
106	18	"Richie Almost Dies"	Jerry Paris	Marty Nadler	January 31, 1978
107	19	"Spunkless Spunky"	Jerry Paris	James Ritz	February 7, 1978
108	20	"Be My Valentine"	Jerry Paris	Fred Maio	February 14, 1978
109	21	"Our Gang"	Jerry Paris	Brian Levant	February 21, 1978
110	22	"My Favorite Orkan"	Jerry Paris	Joe Glauberg	February 28, 1978
111	23	"The Fourth Anniversary Show" "Richie's Girl Exposes the Cunninghams"	Jerry Paris	Bob Brunner & Samuro Mitsubi	March 23, 1978
112	24	"Do You Want to Dance?"	Jerry Paris	Fred Fox, Jr.	May 9, 1978
113	25	"Second Wind"	Jerry Paris	Brian Levant	May 16, 1978
114	26	"Rules to Date By"	Jerry Paris	Joe Glauberg	May 23, 1978
115	27	"Fonzie for the Defense"	Jerry Paris	Dave Ketchum & Tony Di Marco	May 30, 1978

=== Season 6 (1978–79) ===
No. overall	No. in season	Title	Directed by	Written by	Original release date
116 117	1 2	"Westward Ho!: Parts 1 and 2"	Jerry Paris	Walter Kempley	September 12, 1978
118	3	"Westward Ho!: Part 3"	Jerry Paris	Fred Fox, Jr.	September 19, 1978
119	4	"Fonzie's Blindness"	Jerry Paris	Ron Leavitt & Richard Rosenstock	September 26, 1978
120	5	"Casanova Cunningham"	Jerry Paris	Bob Brunner	October 3, 1978
121	6	"Kid Stuff"	Jerry Paris	Fred Fox, Jr.	October 10, 1978
122	7	"Sweet Sixteen"	Jerry Paris	Brian Levant	October 17, 1978
123	8	"Fearless Malph"	Jerry Paris	Walter Kempley	October 24, 1978
124	9	"The Evil Eye"	Jerry Paris	Allen Goldstein	October 31, 1978
125	10	"The Claw Meets the Fonz" "The Godfonzer"	Jerry Paris	Susanne Gayle Harris	November 3, 1978
126	11	"The Fonz Is Allergic to Girls"	Jerry Paris	Mary-David Sheiner & Sheila Judis Weisberg	November 14, 1978
127	12	"The First Thanksgiving"	Jerry Paris	Bob Howard	November 21, 1978
128	13	"The Kissing Bandit"	Jerry Paris	Beverly Bloomberg	November 28, 1978
129	14	"The Magic Show"	Jerry Paris	Don Safran	December 5, 1978
130	15	"Richie Gets Framed"	Jerry Paris	Fred Maio	December 12, 1978
131	16	"Christmas Time"	Jerry Paris	Beverly Bloomberg	December 19, 1978
132	17	"Smokin' Ain't Cool"	Jerry Paris	Michael Loman	January 16, 1979
133	18	"Ralph vs. Potsie"	Jerry Paris	Michael Loman	January 23, 1979
134	19	"Stolen Melodies"	Jerry Paris	Brian Levant	January 30, 1979
135	20	"Married Strangers"	Jerry Paris	Bob Howard	February 6, 1979
136	21	"Marion: Fairy Godmother"	Jerry Paris	Fred Maio	February 13, 1979
137	22	"Fonzie's Funeral: Part 1"	Jerry Paris	Michael Loman	February 20, 1979
138	23	"Fonzie's Funeral: Part 2"	Jerry Paris	Michael Loman	February 27, 1979
139	24	"Mork Returns" "The Fifth Anniversary Show"	Jerry Paris	Walter Kempley	March 6, 1979
140	25	"The Duel"	Jerry Paris	Fred Fox, Jr.	March 13, 1979
141	26	"Chachi's Incredo-Wax"	Jerry Paris	Dave Ketchum & Tony Di Marco	May 8, 1979
142	27	"Potsie Quits School"	Jerry Paris	Story by : James P. Dunne; Teleplay by : David Reo	May 15, 1979

=== Season 7 (1979–80) ===
No. overall	No. in season	Title	Directed by	Written by	Original release date
143	1	"Shotgun Wedding: Part 1"	Jerry Paris	Fred Fox, Jr.	September 11, 1979
144	2	"Chachi Sells His Soul"	Jerry Paris	Walter Kempley	September 18, 1979
145	3	"Fonzie Meets Kat"	Jerry Paris	Dave Ketchum & Tony Di Marco	September 25, 1979
146	4	"Marion Goes to Jail"	Jerry Paris	Barbara Berkowitz	October 2, 1979
147	5	"Richie's Job"	Jerry Paris	Terry Hart	October 9, 1979
148	6	"Richie Falls in Love"	Jerry Paris	Ria Nepus	October 23, 1979
149	7	"Fonzie's a Thespian"	Jerry Paris	Holly White	October 30, 1979
150	8	"Burlesque"	Jerry Paris	Dave Ketchum & Tony Di Marco	November 6, 1979
151	9	"Joanie Busts Out"	Jerry Paris	Beverly Bloomberg	November 13, 1979
152	10	"King Richard's Big Night"	Jerry Paris	James P. Dunne	November 20, 1979
153	11	"Fonzie vs. The She-Devils"	Jerry Paris	Sam Greenbaum	November 27, 1979
154	12	"The Mechanic"	Jerry Paris	Fred Fox, Jr.	December 4, 1979
155	13	"They're Closing Inspiration Point"	Jerry Paris	Beverly Bloomberg	December 11, 1979
156	14	"Here Comes the Bride Again"	Jerry Paris	Bob Howard	December 18, 1979
157	15	"Ah, Wilderness"	Jerry Paris	Barry Rubinowitz	January 8, 1980
158	16	"Joanie's Dilemma"	Jerry Paris	April Kelly	January 15, 1980
159	17	"Hot Stuff"	Jerry Paris	Fred Fox, Jr.	January 22, 1980
160	18	"The New Arnold's"	Jerry Paris	Holly White	January 29, 1980
161	19	"The Hucksters"	Jerry Paris	Mark Rothman	February 5, 1980
162	20	"Allison"	Jerry Paris	Harriett Weiss & Patt Shea	February 12, 1980
163	21	"Fools Rush In"	Jerry Paris	Beverly Bloomberg	February 26, 1980
164	22	"Father & Son"	Jerry Paris	Fred Fox, Jr.	March 4, 1980
165	23	"A Potsie Is Born"	Jerry Paris	Ria Nepus	March 11, 1980
166	24	"The Roaring Twenties"	Jerry Paris	Dave Ketchum & Tony Di Marco	March 25, 1980
167	25	"Ralph's Family Problem"	Jerry Paris	Dave Ketchum & Tony Di Marco	May 6, 1980

=== Season 8 (1980–81) ===
No. overall	No. in season	Title	Directed by	Written by	Original release date
168	1	"No Tell Motel"	Jerry Paris	Lesa Kite & Cindy Begel	November 11, 1980
169	2	"Live and Learn"	Jerry Paris	Fred Fox, Jr.	November 18, 1980
170	3	"Dreams Can Come True"	Jerry Paris	Ria Nepus	November 25, 1980
171	4	"Hello, Roger"	Jerry Paris	William Bickley & Michael Warren	December 2, 1980
172	5	"Joanie Gets Wheels"	Jerry Paris	Dave Ketchum & Tony Di Marco	December 9, 1980
173	6	"White Christmas"	Jerry Paris	Holly White & Stephanie Garman	December 16, 1980
174	7	"And the Winner Is..."	Jerry Paris	Bosco McGowan	December 30, 1980
175	8	"If You Only Knew Rosa"	Jerry Paris	Ria Nepus	January 6, 1981
176	9	"The Sixth Sense"	Jerry Paris	Fred Fox, Jr.	January 13, 1981
177	10	"It Only Hurts When I Smile"	Jerry Paris	Barry Rubinowitz	January 27, 1981
178	11	"Welcome to My Nightmare" "Horror Show"	Jerry Paris	Mark Rothman	February 3, 1981
179	12	"Broadway It's Not" "Chachi Sings, A Star Is Born"	Jerry Paris	James P. Dunne & Barry O'Brien	February 10, 1981
180	13	"Bride and Gloom" "Fonzie and Jenny Married"	Jerry Paris	Mel Sherer & Steve Grant	February 17, 1981
181	14	"Hello, Mrs. Arcola" "Chachi's House"	Jerry Paris	William Bickley & Michael Warren	February 24, 1981
182	15	"Fonzie Gets Shot"	Jerry Paris	Bob Howard	March 3, 1981
183	16	"Potsie on His Own"	Jerry Paris	Holly White	March 17, 1981 (Note: This episode was originally scheduled to air on January 20, 1981, but was preempted due to news coverage of the return of former American hostages in Iran.)
184	17	"Tall Story"	Jerry Paris	Barry Rubinowitz	April 7, 1981
185	18	"Scholarship"	Jerry Paris	Mark Rothman	April 14, 1981
186	19	"R.C. & L.B Forever"	Jerry Paris	Fred Fox, Jr.	May 5, 1981
187	20	"Howard's Bowling Buddy" "Howard's Girlfriend"	Jerry Paris	Bob Howard	May 12, 1981
188	21	"Mother and Child Reunion"	Jerry Paris	Fred Fox, Jr. & Babaloo Mandel	May 19, 1981
189	22	"American Musical"	Jerry Paris	James P. Dunne & Elizabeth Bradley	May 26, 1981

=== Season 9 (1981–82) ===
No. overall	No. in season	Title	Directed by	Written by	Original release date
190	1	"Home Movies"	Jerry Paris	Brian Levant & Fred Fox, Jr.	October 6, 1981
191	2	"Home Movies"	Jerry Paris	Brian Levant & Fred Fox, Jr.	October 6, 1981
192	3	"Not with My Mother, You Don't"	Jerry Paris	Bob Howard	October 13, 1981
193	4	"Another Night at Antoine's"	Jerry Paris	Mark Rothman	October 20, 1981
194	5	"Little Baby Cunningham"	Jerry Paris	Babaloo Mandel & Fred Fox, Jr.	November 3, 1981
195	6	"The Other Guy"	Jerry Paris	Nancy Churnin & Louise Bryant	November 10, 1981
196	7	"Fonzie the Substitute" "Give Me Puberty or Give Me Death"	Jerry Paris	Ralph Farquhar	November 17, 1981
197	8	"Just a Piccalo"	Jerry Paris	Mark Rothman	November 24, 1981
198	9	"The Nun's Story" "No Thank You"	Jerry Paris	Charlotte M. Dobbs	December 1, 1981
199	10	"Baby, It's Cold Inside"	Jerry Paris	Cindy Begel & Lesa Kite	December 8, 1981
200	11	"Hello, Tough Guy"	Jerry Paris	William Bickley & Michael Warren	December 15, 1981
201	12	"To Beanie or Not to Beanie"	Jerry Paris	Holly White & Stephanie Garman	January 5, 1982
202	13	"Southern Crossing"	Jerry Paris	Story by : Brian Levant; Teleplay by : Richard Gurman	January 12, 1982
203	14	"Grandma Nussbaum"	Jerry Paris	James P. Dunne & Barry O'Brien	January 19, 1982
204	15	"Poobah, Doo Dah"	Jerry Paris	Bosco McGowan	January 26, 1982
205	16	"A Touch of Classical"	Jerry Paris	Fred Fox, Jr. & Rich Correll	February 2, 1982
206	17	"Hi-Yo Fonzie, Away!"	Jerry Paris	Fred Fox, Jr. & Rich Correll	February 9, 1982
207	18	"Great Expectations"	Jerry Paris	Andrew M. Horowitz	February 16, 1982
208	19	"Hello, Flip"	Jerry Paris	Paula A. Roth	February 23, 1982
209	20	"Chachi's Future"	Jerry Paris	William Bickley & Michael Warren	March 2, 1982
210	21	"Tell-Tale Tart"	Jerry Paris	Mel Sherer & Steve Grant	March 16, 1982
211	22	"Love and Marriage"	Jerry Paris	Barry Rubinowitz	March 23, 1982

=== Season 10 (1982–83) ===
No. overall	No. in season	Title	Directed by	Written by	Original release date
212	1	"A Woman Not Under the Influence"	Jerry Paris	William Bickley & Michael Warren	September 28, 1982
213	2	"Letting Go"	Jerry Paris	Fred Fox, Jr. & Brian Levant	October 12, 1982
214	3	"Empty Nest"	Jerry Paris	Paula A. Roth	October 19, 1982
215	4	"A Night at the Circus"	Jerry Paris	Joe Glauberg	October 26, 1982
216	5	"A Little Case of Revenge"	Jerry Paris	Fred Fox, Jr. & Rich Correll	November 9, 1982
217	6	"Who Gives a Hootenanny?"	Jerry Paris	Ria Nepus	November 16, 1982
218	7	"Going Steady"	Jerry Paris	Richard Gurman	November 23, 1982
219	8	"Such a Nice Girl"	Jerry Paris	Nancy Steen & Neil Thompson	November 30, 1982
220	9	"There's No Business Like No Business"	Jerry Paris	Story by : John B. Collins; Teleplay by : Paula A. Roth	December 7, 1982
221	10	"All I Want for Christmas"	Jerry Paris	Pamela Ryan & Beverly Bloomberg	December 14, 1982
222	11	"Since I Don't Have You"	Jerry Paris	Brian Levant	December 28, 1982
223	12	"Hello, Pfisters"	Jerry Paris	William Bickley & Michael Warren	January 4, 1983
224	13	"I Drink, Therefore I Am"	Jerry Paris	Gary Murphy & Larry Strawther	January 11, 1983
225	14	"Prisoner of Love"	Jerry Paris	Robert Pekurny	January 18, 1983
226	15	"Life Is More Important Than Show Business"	Jerry Paris	Paula A. Roth	January 25, 1983
227	16	"Nervous Romance"	Jerry Paris	Robert Keats	February 1, 1983
228	17	"I'm Not at Liberty"	Jerry Paris	Pamela Ryan & Beverly Bloomberg	February 8, 1983
229	18	"Wild Blue Yonder"	Jerry Paris	Richard Gurman & Larry Strawther	February 15, 1983
230	19	"May the Best Man Win"	Jerry Paris	Richard Gurman	February 22, 1983
231	20	"Babysitting"	Jerry Paris	Paula A. Roth	March 1, 1983
232	21	"Turn Around...and You're Home"	Jerry Paris	Fred Fox, Jr. & Rich Correll	March 15, 1983
233	22	"Affairs of the Heart"	Jerry Paris	Neil Thompson & Nancy Steen	March 22, 1983

=== Season 11 (1983–84) ===
No. overall	No. in season	Title	Directed by	Written by	Original release date	Rating (households)
234	1	"Because It's There"	Jerry Paris	William Bickley & Michael Warren	September 27, 1983	15.4
235	2	"The Ballad of Joanie and Chachi"	Jerry Paris	Richard Gurman	October 4, 1983	15.3
236	3	"Where the Guys Are"	Jerry Paris	Nancy Steen & Neil Thompson	October 18, 1983	14.7
237	4	"Welcome Home: Part 1"	Jerry Paris	Fred Fox, Jr. & Brian Levant	October 25, 1983	26.7
238	5	"Welcome Home: Part 2"	Jerry Paris	Fred Fox, Jr. & Brian Levant	November 1, 1983	26.8
239	6	"Glove Story"	Jerry Paris	Fred Fox, Jr. & Rich Correll	November 8, 1983	11.8
240	7	"Vocational Education"	Jerry Paris	Brian Levant	November 15, 1983	15.7
241	8	"Arthur, Arthur"	Jerry Paris	Marc Flanagan & Craig Heller	December 6, 1983	13.4
242	9	"You Get What You Pay For"	Jerry Paris	John B. Collins	December 13, 1983	14.5
243	10	"Kiss Me, Teach"	Jerry Paris	Fred Fox, Jr.	January 10, 1984	14.0
244	11	"The People vs. The Fonz"	Jerry Paris	Richard Gurman	January 17, 1984	16.7
245	12	"Like Mother, Like Daughter"	Jerry Paris	Robert Pekurny	January 24, 1984	14.0
246	13	"Social Studies"	Jerry Paris	Paula A. Roth	January 31, 1984	14.1
247	14	"The Spirit Is Willing"	Jerry Paris	Larry Strawther	April 24, 1984	12.9
248	15	"Fonzie Moves Out"	Jerry Paris	Nancy Churnin	May 1, 1984	15.54
249	16	"Passages"	Jerry Paris	Neil Thompson & Nancy Steen	May 8, 1984	20.0
250	17	"Passages"	Jerry Paris	William Bickley & Michael Warren and Brian Levant & Fred Fox, Jr.	May 8, 1984	20.0
251	18	"So How Was Your Weekend?"	Jerry Paris	Paula A. Roth	June 28, 1984	13.67
252	19	"Low Notes"	Jerry Paris	Al Aidekman	July 5, 1984	13.9
253	20	"School Dazed"	Jerry Paris	Roger Garrett	July 12, 1984	13.8
254	21	"Good News, Bad News"	Jerry Paris	William Bickley & Michael Warren	July 19, 1984	13.5
255	22	"Fonzie's Spots"	Jerry Paris	Bob Brunner and Ken Hecht	Aired in syndication	N/A

== Reunion specials ==
Title	Directed by	Written by	Original air date
"The Happy Days Reunion Special"	Malcolm Leo	Sam Denoff & Marc Sheffler and Malcolm Leo	March 3, 1992
A 90-minute special hosted by Henry Winkler with various clips shown from past episodes and cast members reminisce about their time on the show.
"Happy Days: 30th Anniversary Reunion"	Linda Mendoza	Fred Fox, Jr., Stephen Pouliot, Gary Tellalian	February 3, 2005
A two-hour special to commemorate the show's 30th anniversary featuring various clips and a cast reunion at Arnold's Drive-In.

== See also ==
- List of Laverne & Shirley episodes – includes part 2 of "Shotgun Wedding"
- List of Mork & Mindy episodes
