= Nancy Steen =

American actress

- Born: Nancy Jane Steen; January 31, 1950 (age 76); Shoreview, Minnesota, U.S.
- Education: University of Minnesota, 1972, B.A. Theater
- Occupations: Actress, TV screenwriter, and producer
- Years active: 1972–present

Nancy Jane Steen (born January 31, 1950, in Shoreview, Minnesota) is an American television producer, writer and actress.

== Career ==
Steen began her career as an actress at Dudley Riggs' Brave New Workshop in Minneapolis, Minnesota. After graduating from the University of Minnesota in 1972, she studied with Jacques Lecoq in Paris. She then moved to Los Angeles, where she appeared in such television series as Charlie's Angels, Taxi, Mork & Mindy, and M*A*S*H. In 1980, she wrote for the ABC-TV series Police Squad! and Happy Days.

Her television producing and writing credits also include Happy Days, Night Court, Married... with Children, Caroline in the City, Titus, Roseanne, The Love Boat, Jesse, What I Like About You, Kirk and I'm with Her.
