= Richie Cunningham =

Fictional character from Happy Days

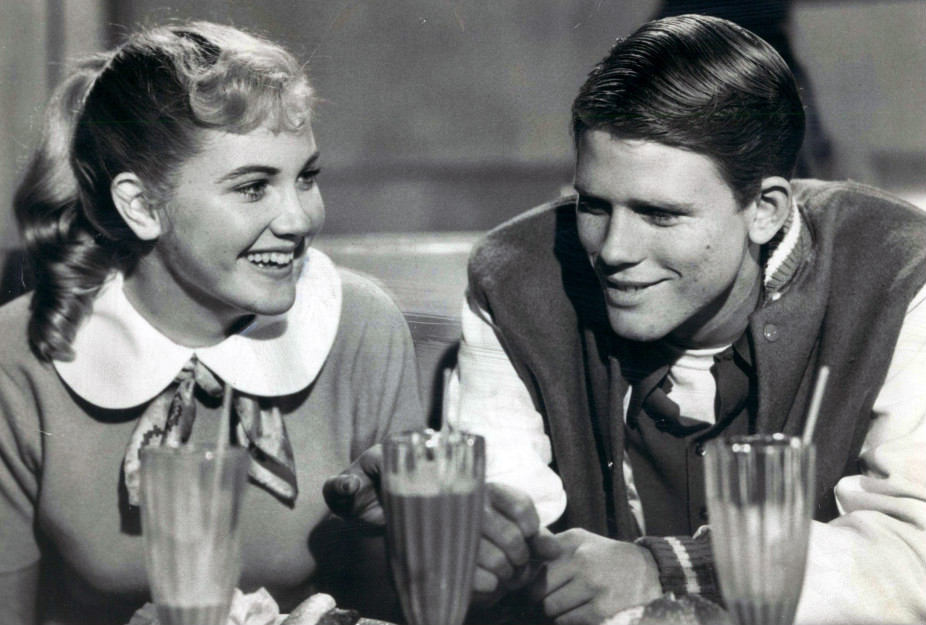
- Richie talking to Mary Lou Milligan
- First appearance: "All the Way"
- Last appearance: “Ron Howard’s Call To Action” (2008)
- Created by: Garry Marshall
- Portrayed by: Ron Howard

In-universe information
- Full name: Richard J. Cunningham
- Occupation: Student, reporter, soldier, screenwriter
- Family: Howard Cunningham (father); Marion Cunningham (mother); Chuck Cunningham (brother); Joanie Cunningham (sister)
- Spouse: Lori Beth Allen
- Children: Richard Cunningham Jr.
- Relatives: Roger Phillips (cousin); Flip Phillips (cousin); K.C. Cunningham

Richard J. Cunningham is a fictional character in the 1970s TV sitcom Happy Days, played by Ron Howard. Richie is Howard and Marion Cunningham's son and Joanie Cunningham and Chuck Cunningham's brother. He is friends with Fonzie, Ralph Malph, and Potsie Weber.

Richie was originally the show's lead character. However, he became less prominent as the character of Fonzie (played by Henry Winkler) became more popular. Ron Howard and Winkler continued to share top billing in the show's opening credits.

== Character traits ==
Richie Cunningham's personality reflected the quintessential All-American 1950s teenager. With his red hair and freckles, he bore a resemblance to Howdy Doody (as noted in the episode "The Howdy Doody Show"). Occasionally, he got into trouble in schemes designed to attract girls. Richie was portrayed as wholesome and caring rather than malicious.

Many of the episodes focused on Richie's attempts to meet women. Despite his demeanor as a clean-cut teenager, he was often depicted scheming to get a date. Examples in the show's plotlines included him buying a new car and joining a local gang. Whenever he was feeling lucky—especially when he spotted a prospective girlfriend—he would sing the Fats Domino line, "I found my thrill... on Blueberry Hill." When he became angry or annoyed, he would call his nemesis "bucko."

Richie's goal was to become a writer. He wrote for the Jefferson High Bule and later became a cub reporter for the Milwaukee Journal. However, in the first-season episode "Because She's There", he told his date that he wanted to attend law school.

Throughout the series' run, Richie remained best friends with Fonzie, Ralph Malph, and Potsie Weber. He was always ready to help them out of trouble. He also looked after his younger sister Joanie as she grew up. In the first season, it was revealed that he and Potsie were best friends since childhood. This was alluded to again in the seventh-season episode, "A Potsie Is Born."

After high school, Richie went to the University of Wisconsin–Milwaukee. He joined the Alpha Tau Omega fraternity and met his girlfriend and future wife, Lori Beth Allen. Richie studied journalism at the university and pursued opportunities to further his writing career.

After graduating from the University of Wisconsin–Milwaukee, Richie served in the U.S. Army and was stationed in Greenland with Ralph. While overseas, Richie married Lori Beth by telephone, with Fonzie standing in as a proxy for Richie. Lori Beth visited Richie in Greenland long enough to get pregnant. Their son was named Richie, Jr.

In the final season, Richie and Ralph returned home from the Army. Howard got Richie a job as a reporter for the Milwaukee Journal. Richie had always wanted to write for the paper but had a new dream of becoming a screenwriter. Richie moved to Hollywood with his family to find work writing for the movies. He returned in the series finale for Joanie and Chachi's wedding.

== Cultural references ==
In Austin Powers: International Man of Mystery, Austin, while undercover, goes by the alias "Richie Cunningham".

In the TV series Dawson's Creek, Pacey likens Dawson to Richie Cunningham (in the first season ninth episode).

In the TV series True Story with Ed & Randall, Gastor describes the police officer who pulls him over as Richie Cunningham (in the first season sixth episode).
