= Ellen Travolta =

American actress (born 1939)

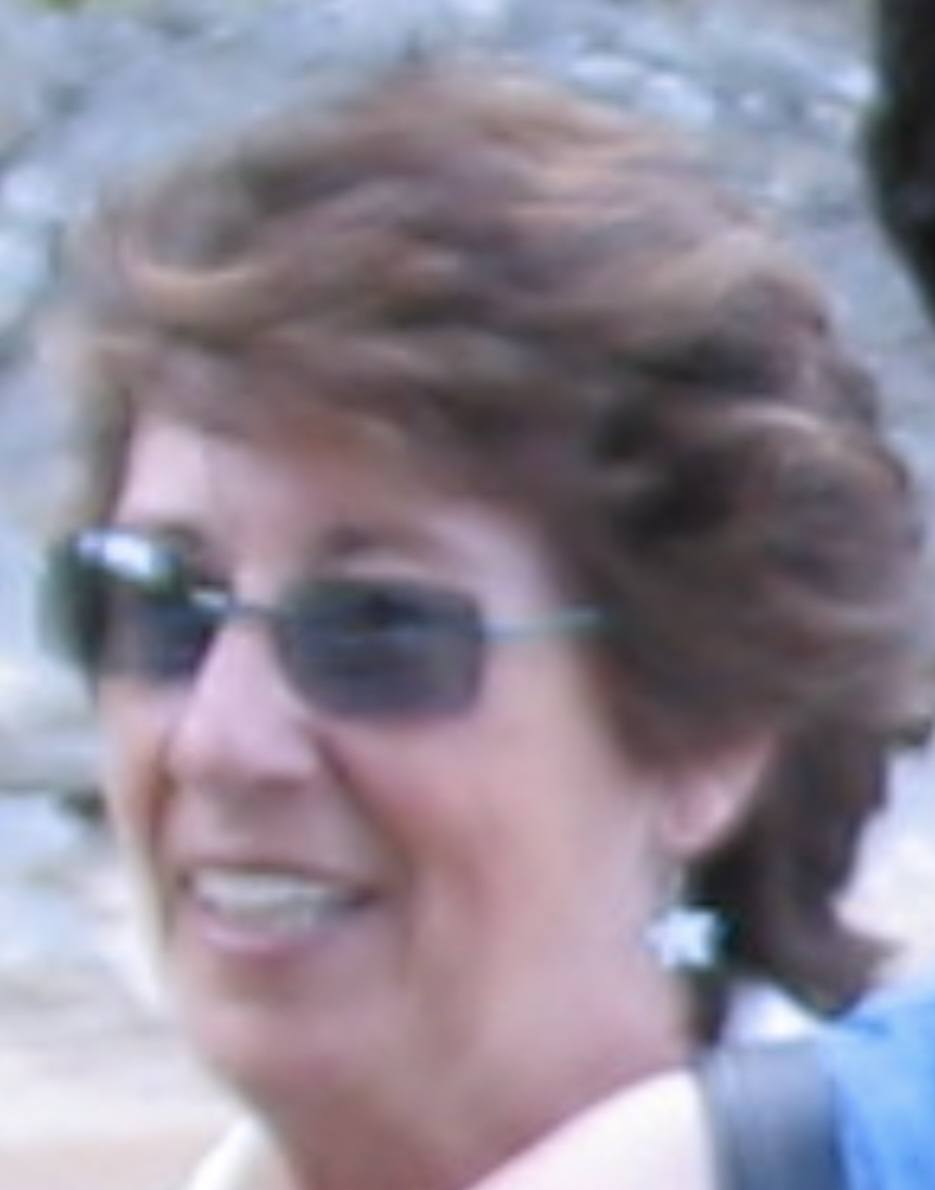
- Travolta in 2004
- Born: October 6, 1939 (age 86); Englewood, New Jersey, U.S.
- Education: Dwight Morrow High School
- Alma mater: Carnegie Mellon University
- Occupation: Actress
- Years active: 1975–present
- Known for: Happy Days; Joanie Loves Chachi; Charles in Charge
- Spouses: James Fridley (m. 1964; div. 1977) Jack Bannon (m. 1983; died 2017)
- Children: 2
- Relatives: Joey Travolta (brother); Margaret Travolta (sister); John Travolta (brother)

Ellen Travolta (born October 6, 1939) is an American actress known for playing Louisa Arcola Delvecchio in Happy Days and Joanie Loves Chachi as well as Gloria Cerullo in General Hospital and Lillian in Charles in Charge (1987–1990).

== Early life ==
Ellen Travolta was born on October 6, 1939, in Englewood, New Jersey to Salvatore ("Sam") Travolta and Helen Cecilia (née Burke) Travolta. Her father was a semi-professional football player before becoming a tire salesman and a partner in a Firestone franchise called Travolta Tires.

Travolta has five younger siblings: Joey, Margaret, Sam, Ann, and John.

Travolta attended Carnegie Mellon University in Pittsburgh, Pennsylvania.

== Career ==
As an actress and singer, she appeared with "The Sunshine Sisters," a radio vocal group. She later became a drama coach, actress, and director of student productions.

She is probably best known for her portrayal of Louisa Arcola Delvecchio, the aunt of Fonzie (Henry Winkler) and mother of Chachi Arcola (Scott Baio), in five episodes during the 1980s of the 1950s-era American sitcom Happy Days and in episodes of its spin-off Joanie Loves Chachi. Travolta also played the mother of Baio's character on the syndicated comedy series Charles in Charge from 1987 to 1990.

She had already portrayed Jimmy Baio's mother on a 1978 episode of The Love Boat. Travolta played Mrs. Horshack-O'Hara in three episodes of Welcome Back, Kotter, a comedy series on which her brother, actor John Travolta, starred as Vinnie Barbarino. She also appeared alongside her brother in the 1978 summer blockbuster Grease. Later in the 1970s, she played Dorothy Manucci in the short-lived television series Makin' It.

== Personal life ==
Travolta has been a longtime performer and supporter of the Coeur d'Alene Summer Theatre where she appeared in a production of Hello, Dolly! in 2000 and 2012 playing the star role opposite her husband's portrayal of Horace Vandergelder. The theatre is the beneficiary of the Helen Burke Travolta Memorial fund, established in honor of Travolta's mother. Travolta has stated, "My mother was the beginning of all of this for us. She loved the theater, and she was always involved with the community theater and she encouraged all of us to be in it."

Travolta married James Fridley in May 1964. They had two children, a son, actor Tom Fridley and a daughter, Molly Allen Ritter.

Travolta and Fridley divorced in 1977. She then married actor Jack Bannon on April 9, 1983. In 1994, the couple moved to Coeur d'Alene, Idaho. They remained together until Bannon's death in 2017.

== Selected TV and filmography ==
- 1976: All in the Family (TV Series) - Secretary
- 1976–1977: Visions (TV Series) - Nurse / Angie
- 1977: Cover Girls (TV Movie) - Photographer
- 1977: What's Happening!! (TV Series) - Lily
- 1977: Police Story (TV Series) - Karen Ramsey
- 1977: Intimate Strangers (TV Movie) - Marilyn Burns
- 1977–1978: Welcome Back, Kotter (TV Series) - Mrs. Horshack-O'Hara
- 1977–1978: Eight Is Enough (TV Series) - Real Estate Agent, Della Gale / Dr. Abbott
- 1978: One Day at a Time (TV Series) - Mrs. Shaddock
- 1978: The President's Mistress (TV Movie) - Analyst
- 1978: CHiPs (TV Series) - Helen
- 1978: Wheels (TV Mini-Series)
- 1978: The Courage and the Passion (TV Movie) - Emily
- 1978: Grease - Waitress
- 1978: Are You in the House Alone? (TV Movie) - Rouillard
- 1978: The Love Boat (TV Series) - Norman's Mother
- 1978: Diff'rent Strokes (TV Series) - Ms. Aimsley
- 1979: Elvis (TV Movie) - Marion Keisker
- 1979: Chief of Detectives (TV Series) - Janine
- 1979: Human Experiments - Mover
- 1979: Marie (TV Movie) - Carla Coburn
- 1979: Makin' It (TV Series) - Dorothy Manucci
- 1980: The Misadventures of Sheriff Lobo (TV Series) - Myra Kimberly
- 1980: Three's Company (TV Series) - Mrs. Marconi
- 1980: Number 96 (TV Series) - Rita Sugarman
- 1981–1984: Happy Days (TV Series) - Louisa Arcola Delvecchio
- 1982: Quincy, M.E. (TV Series) - Mrs. Margolin
- 1982–1983: Joanie Loves Chachi (TV Series) - Louisa Arcola Delvecchio
- 1986: Circle of Violence: A Family Drama (TV Movie) - Marion
- 1987–1990: Charles in Charge (TV Series) - Lillian
- 1989: Murder, She Wrote (TV Series) - Mona
- 1994–1996, 2023-2024: General Hospital (TV Series) - Gloria Cerullo
- 1997: The Single Guy (TV Series) - Mrs. Cordova
- 1997: The Pretender (TV Series) - Dara's Mother
- 1998: Too Hard to Die (Video) - Rose Devlin
- 1998: Mel - Dr. Vogul
- 1999: The Basket - Agnes
- 1999: Passions (TV Series) - Alice
- 2001: Face to Face - Joanne
- 2002: Judging Amy (TV Series) - Mrs. Haskell's lawyer
- 2006: Lonely Hearts - Ida
- 2006: Waitin' to Live - Gossipy Woman
- 2009: Falling Up - Dean Swift
- 2018: Mistrust - Margie
- 2019: The Untold Story - Hope
- 2022: Haul out the Holly - Mary Louise
- 2023: Haul out the Holly: Lit Up - Mary Louise
