= Marion Cunningham (Happy Days) =

Fictional character on the 1970s television series Happy Days

Marion Kelp Cunningham
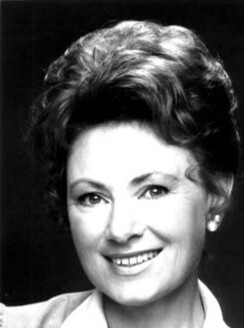
- First appearance: "Love and the Happy Days"
- Last appearance: "Passages Part 2"
- Created by: Garry Marshall
- Portrayed by: Marion Ross

In-universe information
- Nickname: Mrs. C, Mrs. Cunningham, Mrs. Average
- Gender: Female
- Occupation: Waitress at Arnold's (one episode; "Marion Rebels")
- Family: Mother Kelp (mother); Mrs Phillips (sister)
- Spouse: Howard C. Cunningham (husband)
- Children: Richie Cunningham (son); Joanie Cunningham (daughter); Chuck Cunningham (son)
- Relatives: Roger Phillips (nephew); Flip Phillips (nephew); KC Cunningham (niece); Sean Cunningham (father-in-law); Charles "Chachi" Arcola (son-in-law); Lori Beth Cunningham (daughter-in-law)

Marion Cunningham (née Kelp) is a fictional character in the 1970s American television sitcom Happy Days. She was played by Marion Ross, after whom the character was named, and first appears in the Love, American Style episode "Love and the Happy Days". Another lead character of the show, Marion appears in almost every episode of the series, with the exception of 2, and is one of three characters to remain on the show for all 11 seasons. She is also one of three characters to be played by the same actors on Love, American Style as well as Happy Days (the others being Richie and Potsie).

== Bio ==
Marion Cunningham is married to Howard Cunningham and the mother of Richie, Joanie, and (briefly) Chuck Cunningham; she sometimes plays the role of a surrogate mother to Fonzie, who usually called her "Mrs. C". Marion, on the other hand, is the only person Fonzie allows to address him by his birth name, Arthur. She is a housewife and tends to the typical domestic responsibilities: cooking, cleaning, and looking after the kids while her husband is at work.

Marion once became frustrated by her life as a housewife and fell out with Howard about it. Fonzie encouraged her to work at Arnold's as a waitress but she insulted Al's menu and interfered with people's orders (see "Marion Rebels" from Season 4).

Marion became worried that Howard would leave her for a younger woman after she found out that one of her friends left his wife for a younger woman. She tries to prove to him that she is still young at heart but she goes completely over the top, Salome-style (see "Marion's Misgivings" from Season 5).

Marion once went to jail after crashing Howard's beloved DeSoto into Arnold's (see "Marion Goes to Jail" from Season 7).
