= Ed Peck =

American actor (1917–1992)

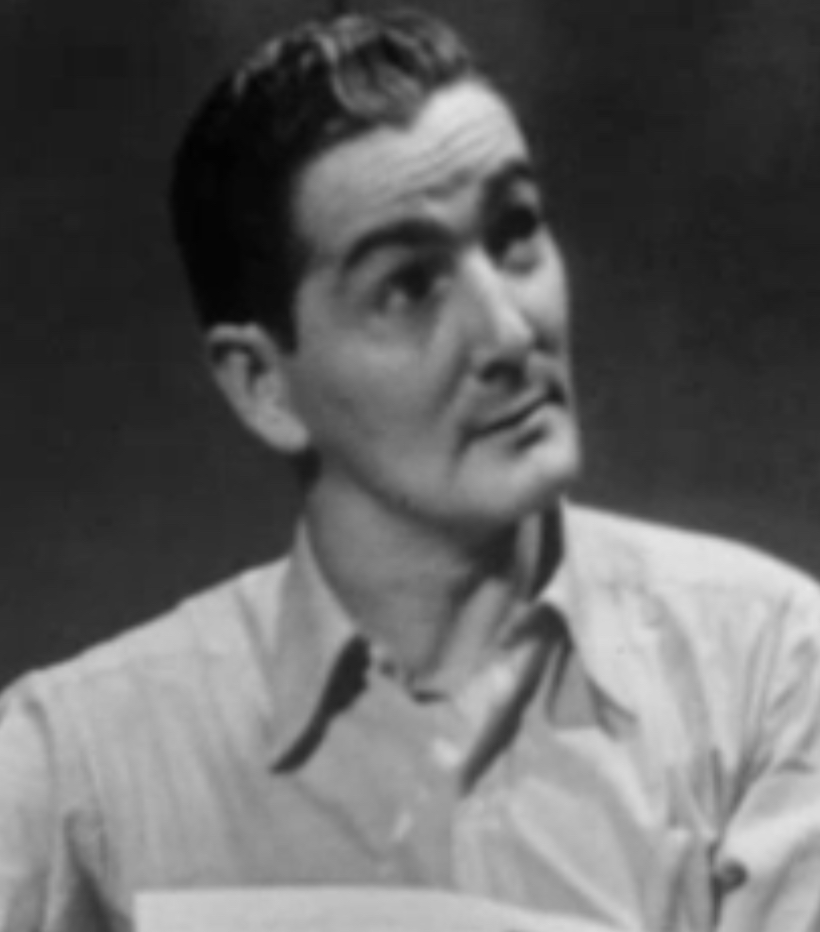
- Peck in an episode of Tales of Tomorrow (1952)
- Born: March 26, 1917
- Died: September 12, 1992 (aged 75); Los Angeles, California, U.S.
- Occupation: Actor
- Years active: 1950–1983
- Spouse: Phyllis Houston

Ed Peck (March 26, 1917 – September 12, 1992) was an American actor. He is best known as Officer Kirk in Happy Days (1975–1983).

== Career ==
Peck played a captain in the Broadway production of No Time for Sergeants (1955). He was active in television and in films from 1951 to 1983, specializing in playing either police officers or military officers.

In 1951, Peck replaced Eric Fleming in the title role of Major Dell Conway of the Flying Tigers on the DuMont Television Network. In 1969 Peck appeared as the Hotel Manager on the TV Series The Virginian in the episode titled "Journey to Scathelock." One of his highest profile parts was among his last, in the television series Happy Days, in the recurring role as police officer Kirk from 1975 to 1983. He also played a police officer similar to Officer Kirk in at least one episode of the television series All in the Family and two episodes of Barney Miller as patrolman (later officer) Frank Slater.

Peck was an announcer on The Jack Carson Show, a variety program on NBC-TV in 1953–1954. He also was a member of the cast of the summer 1972 television sitcom The Super, portraying Officer Clark, a tenant in a New York City apartment building. He also guest-starred on dozens of television series including The Untouchables, Perry Mason, The Fugitive, Kentucky Jones, Get Smart, Gunsmoke, Star Trek ("Tomorrow Is Yesterday", 1967), Cannon, and Bonanza, as well as films such as Heaven Can Wait, Bullitt, Cheech and Chong's Next Movie, and The Prisoner of Second Avenue. He played the Governor's director of security, Captain McDermott, on several episodes of Benson. He played a rabbi and Capt. Worwick in two episodes of The Dick Van Dyke Show.

After leaving the Happy Days series in 1983, he retired from acting.

== Personal life ==
On January 20, 1952, Peck married advertising copywriter Phyllis Houston in New York.

== Death ==
Peck died of a heart attack on September 12, 1992, in Los Angeles, California, at the age of 75.

== Filmography (partial) ==
Year	Title	Role	Notes
1964	One Man's Way	Harry the Reporter	
1965	Kentucky Jones	Jim Heller	Episode "Kentucky′s Vacation"
1965	The Third Day	Bud	Uncredited
1966	Combat!	Pvt. Coker	1 episode
1967	The Ride to Hangman's Tree	Sheriff Stewart	
1967	Gunn	Minor Role	Uncredited
1967	Star Trek	Col. Fellini	1 episode
1967	Counterpoint	Prescott	
1968	A Man Called Gannon	Delivery Rider	
1968	The Shakiest Gun in the West	Sheriff	
1968	I Love You, Alice B. Toklas	Man in Dress Shop	
1968	Bullitt	Westcott	
1969	The Comic	Edwin G. Englehardt	
1971	Willy Wonka & the Chocolate Factory	FBI Agent	Uncredited
1972	The Carey Treatment	Turnkey / Police Sergeant	Uncredited
1972	Every Little Crook and Nanny	Emilio	Uncredited
1973	Blume in Love	Ed Goober	
1975	Rafferty and the Gold Dust Twins	Mr. Big Time	
1975	The Prisoner of Second Avenue	Mr. Jacobi	
1976	Special Delivery	Man in Booth	
1977	Tracks		
1978	Heaven Can Wait	Trainer	
1978	The Incredible Hulk	Captain Brandes	1 episode
1980	Cheech & Chong's Next Movie	Cop Shotgun	
1981	Zoot Suit	Lieutenant Edwards	
1982	Hey Good Lookin'	Italian Man	Voice
1983	The Last Unicorn	Jack Jingley	Voice
1983	Likely Stories, Vol. 3	General Powerhouse Announcer	
