= Howard Cunningham (Happy Days) =

Fictional character in Happy Days

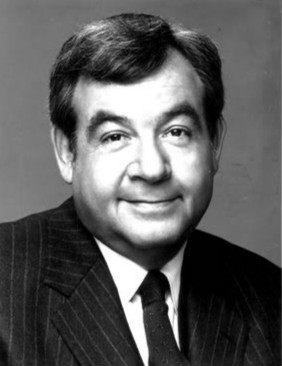
- Tom Bosley as Howard Cunningham in 1976
- First appearance: "Love and the Happy Days"
- Last appearance: "Passages Part 2"
- Created by: Garry Marshall
- Portrayed by: Harold Gould (pilot on Love, American Style); Tom Bosley

In-universe information
- Nickname: Mr. C
- Gender: Male
- Occupation: owner of Cunningham hardware
- Affiliation: Republican
- Family: Sean Cunningham (father); Dick Cunningham (brother)
- Spouse: Marion Kelp
- Children: Chuck Cunningham; Richie Cunningham; Joanie Cunningham
- Relatives: Joe Cunningham (uncle); K.C. Cunningham (niece)
- Nationality: American

Howard C. Cunningham is a fictional character played by Tom Bosley on the 1970s sitcom Happy Days. Actor Harold Gould played the character in the pilot, which aired as an episode of the anthology series Love, American Style. He is the husband of Marion Cunningham, and the father of Chuck, Richie, and Joanie Cunningham. Originally, Gould was supposed to reprise his role on Happy Days as Howard Cunningham but wanted to commit to something else so Bosley was offered the part. Howard is one of only two characters, the other being Fonzie, to appear in all 255 episodes of Happy Days and to remain with the rest of the cast for all 11 seasons; of the two, Howard is the only one to have also appeared in the pilot.

== Biography ==
Howard Cunningham was born on September 28, 1910 (it is revealed in season 3's "Howard's 45th Fiasco" that his birthday is on Confucius's birthday; the year is 1955). In Howard's youth, Cunningham was a cook in the Army. In his later years, he became owner of a hardware store (Cunningham Hardware) while residing in Milwaukee, Wisconsin with his family. His character was written to portray Cunningham to be the stereotypical all-American 1950s father: a sage, white, Republican business owner in Middle America with traditional values. He was a member of Leopard Lodge No. 462 in Milwaukee, eventually becoming its "Grand Poobah".

Originally Howard had a special disdain for Fonzie, who seemed a troublesome hood. However, during a brief period of financial insecurity about the fate of his store, Howard agreed to rent out the apartment over the family's garage. The most promising tenant was Fonzie's grandmother, but she declined and Richie convinced Fonzie to use it instead. Howard was aghast at the idea, even when Fonzie insisted on paying three months in advance before moving in. Howard originally would only tolerate a week's time as a trial, but despite some unintended disturbances, he agreed to make Fonzie's tenancy permanent. Eventually, Howard would warm to Fonzie as a family friend.

== Trivia ==
- He is referred to affectionately as "Mr. C" by Richie's friends, although Ralph Malph likes to call him "Howie" at times.
- His favorite car is a DeSoto, which was the only car he ever owned until he gets a new car in season 10.
- He likes to go golfing with Chachi as his caddy.
- Cunningham Hardware, Howard's hardware store, was referenced in an episode of the 1986–1993 sitcom Perfect Strangers (the show that spun off Family Matters). A character brings out a toilet for a stunt and says that it is courtesy of Cunningham Hardware in Milwaukee, Wisconsin.
