= Happy Days season 5 =

Season 5 of the television series Happy Days

Happy Days
- Season 5
- No. of episodes: 27

Release
- Original network: ABC
- Original release: September 13, 1977 – May 30, 1978

Season chronology
- ← Previous; Season 4 Next → Season 6

This is a list of episodes from the fifth season of Happy Days.

== Cast ==
=== Main ===
- Ron Howard as Richie Cunningham
- Henry Winkler as Arthur "Fonzie" Fonzarelli
- Marion Ross as Marion Cunningham
- Anson Williams as Warren "Potsie" Weber
- Don Most as Ralph Malph
- Erin Moran as Joanie Cunningham
- Al Molinaro as Alfred "Al" Delvecchio
- Scott Baio as Chachi Arcola
- Tom Bosley as Howard Cunningham

=== Guest ===
- Lynda Goodfriend as Lori Beth Allen
- Morgan Fairchild as socialite Cynthia Holmes
- Ed Peck as Officer Kirk
- Suzi Quatro as Leather Tuscadero
- Lorrie Mahaffey as Jennifer Jerome
- Robin Williams as Mork

== Broadcast history ==
The season aired Tuesdays at 8:00-8:30 pm (EST).

== Episodes ==
No. overall	No. in season	Title	Directed by	Written by	Original release date
89	1	"Hollywood"	Jerry Paris	Joe Glauberg & Walter Kempley	September 13, 1977
90	2	"Hollywood"	Jerry Paris	Joe Glauberg & Walter Kempley	September 13, 1977
A couple of Hollywood talent scouts look for Fonzie when their limousine breaks down while passing through Milwaukee, and when they find him they like Fonzie's looks. Thinking that he could be the next James Dean, they invite Fonzie to Hollywood for a film audition. With Potsie and Ralph eager to impress the scouts too, Fonzie invites them and the Cunningham family to join him on his trip to Hollywood. But his big screen test is not all that Fonzie has to be concerned with—-an obnoxious local hero, who calls himself "the California Kid," challenges Fonzie to a water skiing duel. Note: This episode introduces Scott Baio as Chachi Arcola, Fonzie's cousin and future boyfriend (and later husband) of Joanie. Note: Lorne Greene appears in an uncredited cameo in Part 1. Absent: Al Molinaro as Al Delvecchio; Scott Baio as Chachi Arcola (in Part 2).
91	3	"Hollywood: Part 3"	Jerry Paris	Fred Fox, Jr.	September 20, 1977
"The California Kid" challenges Fonzie to jump over a tiger shark on water skis, convinced that he will be too scared and back out. Fonzie is too proud to back down and accepts the challenge. Meanwhile; Richie, after impressing a talent scout at Fonzie's audition, mulls over a decision about the film contract he has been offered. Side note: Fonzie's shark jump scene in this episode inspired the term "jumping the shark," the point at which a television series begins to decline in quality or loses its earlier appeal.
92	4	"Hard Cover"	Jerry Paris	Brian Levant	September 27, 1977
Concerned about the lack of action in his love life, Richie asks Fonzie for some dating advice. Fonzie suggests that they go to the college library to meet sophisticated college girls, where Richie meets the attractive Lori Beth. But when they go back to her dorm, Richie learns that the hall's doors are locked at 10:00pm sharp, and he is now locked in for the night. If Richie is discovered, Lori Beth will be expelled. Note: This episode introduces Lynda Goodfriend as Lori Beth Allen, Richie's girlfriend and future wife. (Goodfriend had previously appeared in two earlier episodes as a different character, Kim, a girlfriend of Richie and Ralph.) Absent: Al Molinaro as Al Delvecchio; Scott Baio as Chachi Arcola.
93	5	"My Cousin the Cheat"	Jerry Paris	Walter Kempley	October 4, 1977
When Chachi gets in trouble with the truant officer for skipping school, Fonzie tells his young cousin that if he gets good grades he can have a part-time job at the garage, as an incentive to stay in school. But the idea backfires when Chachi decides to cheat on an exam, tricking the answers out of Joanie. When Fonzie finds out, he is enraged. Note: Ralph and Potsie only appear briefly near the end of the episode.
94	6	"Fonsillectomy"	Jerry Paris	Marty Nadler	October 25, 1977
Fonzie is ill, and the doctor says he must go into the hospital the next day to have his tonsils removed, meaning that he will miss the Cunninghams' Halloween party. Fonzie does not take the news well; and to add insult to injury, the only available room in the hospital is on the children's ward. Note: Tom Bosley's daughter Amy portrays one of the "trick-or-treaters," while two of director Garry Marshall's children appear as hospitalized children. Inaccuracy note: Although the episode's plot is about Fonzie going to the hospital to have his tonsils removed, in the episode "Haunted," Fonzie mentions having his tonsils removed when he was a child. (It is, however, not uncommon for a person's tonsils to grow back after they have been removed.)
95	7	"The Apartment"	Jerry Paris	Dixie Brown Grossman	November 1, 1977
Richie, Potsie, and Ralph rent an apartment owned by Chachi's mother. Despite its run-down condition, they are all excited to have a place of their own. But things turn sour when Potsie and Ralph continually argue, leaving Richie desperately trying to keep the peace. Notes: Potsie and Ralph continue to live in the apartment after this episode (Richie decides to return home). This situation remains until Richie and Ralph leave the series for the Army.; This episode was intended to be the pilot for a proposed spinoff series "Ralph and Potsie," but the series never evolved.; Although out of order, this was the first episode of the season produced.
96	8	"Fonzie and Leather Tuscadero: Part 1" "Fonzie - Rock Entrepreneur: Part 1"	Jerry Paris	Bob Brunner	November 8, 1977
Pinky Tuscadero's sister Leather Tuscadero (Suzi Quatro), a reformed thief-turned-musician, comes to town with her backup singers, the Suedes, to audition for a gig at Arnold's. Fonzie is wary of her after having his heart broken by Pinky, not to mention that Leather once stole his wallet and comb. But that is the least of Leather's worries; Officer Kirk threatens to close the place down if Al hires any ex-cons. Note: Suzi Quatro makes her first of seven appearances as Leather Tuscadero. The producers reportedly offered to give Quatro a spin-off series based on the character, but Quatro turned the offer down. Only passing references are made to Pinky, after Roz Kelly was dropped due to disagreements with the producers.
97	9	"Fonzie and Leather Tuscadero: Part 2" "Fonzie - Rock Entrepreneur: Part 2"	Jerry Paris	Bob Brunner	November 15, 1977
With an apparent promise of celebrity status, Leather & the Suedes go on tour beginning in San Francisco. Joanie, who had been singing with the group, is determined to go with them; but when her parents object, Joanie runs away, determined to join the group anyway. Absent: Scott Baio as Chachi Arcola.
98	10	"My Fair Fonzie"	Jerry Paris	Warren S. Murray	November 22, 1977
A rich socialite (Morgan Fairchild) and her snobbish cousin invite Fonzie to a posh yacht-club dinner party, intending to make a fool out of him in front of everyone. But Al overhears the scheme, and thanks to a crash course in etiquette by the Cunninghams, Fonzie turns the tables on them.
99	11	"Bye Bye Blackball"	Jerry Paris	Barry Rubinowitz	November 29, 1977
Richie, Potsie, and Ralph are desperate to join the best fraternity on campus, but first they have to survive the "Hell Week" initiations. They are prepared to go through anything, but will Richie choose the fraternity over loyalty to his friends?
100	12	"Requiem for a Malph"	Jerry Paris	Steve Zacharias	December 6, 1977
Ralph is in love with Kitty, a beautiful young woman, who is in an unhappy relationship with the football team's star fullback, Rebel E. Lee. When Rebel finds out about the pair's relationship, he is furious with Ralph. Instead of a fight, Fonzie arranges a boxing match between the pair to settle the dispute. But there's one problem: Ralph cannot box to save his life. Absent: Scott Baio as Chachi Arcola.
101	13	"Nose for News"	Jerry Paris	Walter Kempley	December 13, 1977
After getting a "D" on a paper for his investigative reporting class, Richie decides to search for a big story to help improve his grade. Perhaps Howard's battle with the sanitation department that is trying to force him to pay a weekly surcharge is the big story he needs!
102	14	"Grandpa's Visit"	Jerry Paris	George F. Slavin	December 20, 1977
Howard's 65-year-old father, Sean "Cap" Cunningham (special guest star Danny Thomas), a police detective recently forced into retirement, comes to visit the family, but announces that he is already bored with retirement and plans to look for a job. Will he find a job that suits him? This is the first episode with Scott Baio in the opening credits
103	15	"Potsie Gets Pinned"	Jerry Paris	Fred Fox, Jr.	January 10, 1978
Potsie falls in love with Jennifer Jerome, a pretty girl whom he met in a kissing booth. After just one date, Potsie decides that he wants to marry her. The rest of the gang are unsure of Potsie's intention and persuades Howard to have a talk with him, who suggests that they get "pinned" instead. (Coincidentally, Anson Williams and Lorrie Mahaffey - who played Jennifer - were soon married after the shooting of this episode.) Notes: This episode marks the first appearance of Potsie's steady girlfriend Jennifer Jerome (Anson Williams' then soon-to-be wife Lorrie Mahaffey). Also, Scott Baio only appears briefly in the beginning of this episode.
104	16	"Joanie's First Kiss"	Jerry Paris	Barbara O'Keefe	January 17, 1978
Joanie is asked out on a date by David O'Dooley, a hunky senior who owns a car. Howard is against the date, and when he reluctantly agrees, Richie and Fonzie advise Joanie on how to fend off any unwanted advances. Will all this lead to Joanie's first kiss?
105	17	"Marion's Misgivings"	Jerry Paris	Fred Maio	January 24, 1978
After a friend of the family leaves his wife for a younger woman, Marion begins to worry that Howard might do the same to her and decides to try to prove to him that she's still young at heart—but goes completely over the top, Salome-style. Recurring guest: Suzi Quatro as Leather Tuscadero
106	18	"Richie Almost Dies"	Jerry Paris	Marty Nadler	January 31, 1978
Richie has bought a motorcycle. His parents are very unhappy about it, but he convinces them that everything will be okay. He is then involved in a very serious accident on the bike, which leaves him hospitalized with a coma. As the rest of the gang anxiously await news, Fonzie holds a bedside vigil to try to help pull his friend through. During a somber moment at the Cunninghams, Leather plays the piano and sings while a montage of scenes from past episodes involving Richie are shown. Recurring guest: Suzi Quatro as Leather Tuscadero Side note: This episode is noted for being the occasion when, praying to God for Richie to recover, Fonzie breaks down in tears. In the 30th anniversary special it was revealed that this was done at the request of teachers of abused children. The children admired Fonzie's "coolness," but the teachers requested the show prove it was okay for "cool" guys to show emotion at times as well.
107	19	"Spunkless Spunky"	Jerry Paris	James Ritz	February 7, 1978
Fonzie's dog Spunky seems to be depressed. After a visit to the veterinarian, it is suggested that Spunky's problem is mental. Dr. Joyce Brothers (guest starring as herself) comes to take a look at him. (Spunky seems to have changed gender between seasons!)
108	20	"Be My Valentine"	Jerry Paris	Fred Maio	February 14, 1978
It's Valentine's Day; and at Arnold's, as the gang exchange cards and gifts, Joanie daydreams about the romantic songs that they could sing to each other. Special guest star: Christopher Knight.
109	21	"Our Gang"	Jerry Paris	Brian Levant	February 21, 1978
When Chachi arrives at Arnold's wearing a gang jacket; Richie tells him the story of how he first met Fonzie, who was involved with a gang (The Falcons), to try to illustrate to Chachi that gangs are nothing but trouble. Notes: The name of Chachi's gang, The Lords, is possibly an inside reference to the film The Lords of Flatbush, in which Winkler starred as one of the Lords' gang members. The film premiered in May 1974, three and a half months after Happy Days debuted. Also, during the "flashback" scene at Arnold's, Beatrice Colen makes a return appearance as Marsha Simms.
110	22	"My Favorite Orkan"	Jerry Paris	Joe Glauberg	February 28, 1978
Mork (Robin Williams), an alien from the planet Ork, arrives on Earth and tries to take Richie back to his native planet as an example of an average "humdrum" human, but Fonzie stands in his way. Note: Two versions of this episode exist: On its original broadcast, it was revealed that the events were all just Richie's dream; and after Richie wakes up, a man who looks strangely like Mork (also portrayed by Williams) knocks at the door in the final scene asking for directions. Afterwards, when it was decided to give Mork his own spinoff series (Mork and Mindy), an extension of the final scene was added, with Mork, outside of the Cunninghams' house (after having knocked on the door) communicating with Orson, who sent him on another mission to 1978, setting the scene for Mork and Mindy.
111	23	"The Fourth Anniversary Show" "Richie's Girl Exposes the Cunninghams"	Jerry Paris	Bob Brunner & Samuro Mitsubi	March 23, 1978
Lori Beth is assigned to write a report on the average middle-class American family, and interviews various members of the gang about their memories of Richie and his family (which they reveal through clips from past episodes). But Richie is concerned that she is trying to find out about his previous girlfriends. Note: Although out of order, this episode was the last episode of the season produced.
112	24	"Do You Want to Dance?"	Jerry Paris	Fred Fox, Jr.	May 9, 1978
Fonzie has fallen in love with a moderately successful ballet dancer, but must face the fact that she may be happier dancing professionally in New York.
113	25	"Second Wind"	Jerry Paris	Brian Levant	May 16, 1978
Al is to receive the Man of the Year Award from the Sons of Italy, but he has no one to take for a date. Fonzie sets him up with Anna, a meter maid, whom Al quickly falls in love with.
114	26	"Rules to Date By"	Jerry Paris	Joe Glauberg	May 23, 1978
When Richie gets jealous of Lori Beth's friendships with other men, they argue and break up; but agree to go on a weekend trip where the band is performing with Leather & the Suedes. However, their squabbling continues throughout the trip. Recurring guest: Suzi Quatro as Leather Tuscadero
115	27	"Fonzie for the Defense"	Jerry Paris	Dave Ketchum & Tony Di Marco	May 30, 1978
Howard and Fonzie are summoned for jury duty. The case involves a black biker who is accused of stealing an old lady's purse, and it seems to be an open-and-shut case. However, Fonzie hangs the jury, believing that the young man is "not guilty-amundo," and must convince the rest of the jury. Guest starring: Ralph Wilcox as Jason Davis; Barney Martin as G.W. Bruch.
