= My Favorite Orkan =

- Happy Days episode
- Episode no.: Season 5 Episode 22
- Directed by: Jerry Paris
- Story by: Joe Glauberg; Garry Marshall
- Production code: 110
- Original air date: February 28, 1978

Guest appearance
- Robin Williams – Mork from Ork

Episode chronology
← Previous "Our Gang"	Next → "Richie's Girl Exposes the Cunninghams"
- Happy Days (season 5)

"My Favorite Orkan" is the 22nd episode of the fifth season of the American television sitcom Happy Days, and the 110th episode overall. Written by Joe Glauberg and series creator Garry Marshall and directed by Jerry Paris, the episode originally aired on ABC on February 28, 1978. It is notable for introducing Robin Williams to a larger audience; the actor's popular appearance in this episode led to the spin-off series Mork & Mindy, which was based on his character.

== Plot ==
At Arnold's Drive-In, Richie remarks that he thinks he saw a flying saucer, but Fonzie, Ralph, Potsie and Chachi don't believe him. When Richie returns home, he finds his family has gone to the movies. Someone knocks on the door: a visitor dressed in red, with a triangle on his shirt and wearing a helmet. The visitor speaks very strangely and Richie thinks it is Ralph pulling a prank; instead, the visitor reveals himself as "Mork", an alien from the planet Ork.

Richie decides to interview Mork. When asked why he is visiting Earth, Mork tells him that he is trying to collect a "specimen". Richie asks him if he is going to take the President or maybe baseball star Hank Aaron; Mork says no, telling Richie that Ork would have to trade the entire planet for someone so famous. Instead, Mork claims he needs someone average and "humdrum": Richie himself. At first, Richie demurs, but when Mork tells him that he will bring him back in an "instant", Richie agrees to go. He heads upstairs to pack and tells Mork to make himself comfortable; the spaceman does, watching The Andy Griffith Show on the family TV set. ("I like that boy Opie," Mork remarks, "funny though, he has an Orkan name!" Opie was played by a young Ron Howard, who played Richie on Happy Days.) The movie over, Joanie, Marion and Howard return to the house and notice Mork sitting on the couch; thinking "he must be a friend of Richard's", they let Mork's odd behavior go for the moment, including the Orkan's predilection to "sit down" by lying face first on the couch with his backside in the air.

Howard and Mork get into a dispute when Mork seemingly damages the TV set by pointing his finger at it; Howard starts to point his finger at Mork and all three Cunninghams (except Richie) are frozen and cannot move. (Howard "drew first", Mork explains to Richie.) After being assured the "freezing" effects will eventually wear off, Richie asks Mork exactly how long they will be gone; the spaceman tells Richie it will be a mere 2,000 years in Earth time. When Mork is not looking, though, Richie makes a run for it, escaping to Arnold's.

Back at Arnold's, Richie tells Fonzie in the men's room that there is a spaceman after him. Fonzie is dubious, which causes Richie grab hold of Fonzie's jacket: a serious breach of "cool" protocol. Fonzie heads out of the rest room and sees the gang singing a song onstage and Al smiling and watching them; suddenly, Mork points his finger and everybody but Richie and Fonzie are frozen. Fonzie introduces himself, but things don't go well. ("Do you want to rumble [i.e. fight]?" Fonzie asks, to which Mork replies, "Ah, rhumba!" and hums a bit from West Side Story.) Mork says if he wins, Richie will go with him, but if Fonzie wins he does not have to go; the fight starts and is seemingly over in an instant as Mork freezes the Fonz with his all-powerful finger. Just when Mork is about to take Richie away, however, Fonzie gets out of the frozen position and says "Ayyy!" with both of his thumbs up.

The battle continues, as Mork and Fonzie put their thumbs together, causing a green light to appear between them. When Mork points his finger at the jukebox and turns it on, Fonzie (using his patented move) bangs on it to turn it off again; all the while, Richie writes the events down in his notebook. At one point, Mork strips Ralph to his underwear, then unfreezes him. Ralph, confused, runs out of Arnold's in terror. Fonzie snaps his fingers at a frozen waitress and they start to make out; Mork tries this on a blond girl, only to make Potsie walk to him instead ("I'll give you that one," Mork concedes). When Mork uses Al for "target practice", making the owner walk around like a robot and bumping into things, Fonzie does the same thing by snapping his fingers.

Finally, Mork says "no one can top this one": he will put his fingers together and make the whole building collapse. Not wanting to see anyone get hurt, Fonzie stops the Orkan and reluctantly admits defeat. Richie says he will go in peace, but Mork decides to take Fonzie back to Ork instead. When Richie tries to stop Mork from taking Fonzie, he suddenly wakes up on the family couch: it was all just a dream. When Richie mentions the flying saucer, Howard says it was actually a weather balloon. Again, the doorbell rings and Richie answers it; at the door is a man who resembles Mork, except he is speaking with a Southern accent and merely asking for directions. (In an ending shot for the summer 1978 rerun, it turns out the man really is Mork, and he made it seem like the entire event was a dream. He recounts the events to his superior Orson, who assigns him to modern-day 1978, leading up to the events of Mork & Mindy. This ending now airs in syndication.)

== Production history ==
Producer Garry Marshall watched Star Wars with his son, who asked him for a Happy Days episode with an alien in it. The cast considered the original script unusable, and production proved so difficult that the intended actor for the alien, Roger Rees, abruptly quit. Marshall asked the cast if they could help quickly find a replacement. Al Molinaro suggested fellow acting student Robin Williams; Penny Marshall recognized the name and agreed with the suggestion.

After Williams impressed Marshall with his quirky sense of humor at the audition by sitting on his head when told to take a seat, Williams was quickly hired. The cast was astounded on set at Williams effortlessly improvising the whole Mork persona on the spot and thus creating a highly amusing character that inspired the writing staff to rewrite the script around the character that Williams had devised. Encouraged by Williams's talent, the cast and crew invited everyone around the studio to see Williams perform with the typical description of him being "He's a genius!" This included network executives who heard of this new performer's outstanding talent. The executives were so impressed that a contract for Williams to star in his own series, Mork & Mindy, was prepared and signed four days later.

Henry Winkler and Penny Marshall would guest-star as Fonz and Laverne, respectively, in the pilot episode of Mork & Mindy, and Mork would return to Happy Days in the sixth-season episode "Mork Returns".

== Main cast ==
- Ron Howard as Richie Cunningham
- Henry Winkler as Arthur "Fonzie" Fonzarelli
- Marion Ross as Marion Cunningham
- Anson Williams as Warren "Potsie" Weber
- Don Most as Ralph Malph
- Erin Moran as Joanie Cunningham
- Al Molinaro as Al Delvecchio
- Scott Baio as Chachi Arcola
- Tom Bosley as Howard Cunningham

== Supporting cast and guest cast ==
- Robin Williams as Mork from Ork
