= Jumping the shark =

Allegation of using gimmicks to retain audience

Fonzie (played by Henry Winkler) on water skis after jumping over a shark in the 1977 Happy Days episode "Hollywood: Part 3", which became the basis of the phrase

The idiom "jumping the shark", or "shark jumping", or to "jump the shark"; means that a creative work or entity has evolved and reached a point in which it has exhausted its core intent and is introducing new ideas that are discordant with or an extreme exaggeration (caricature) of its original theme or purpose. The phrase was coined in 1985 by radio personality Jon Hein in response to a 1977 episode from the fifth season of the American sitcom Happy Days, in which the character of Fonzie (Henry Winkler) jumps over a live shark while on water-skis.

== History ==
=== Origin ===
Future radio personality Jon Hein and his University of Michigan roommate Sean Connolly coined the phrase in 1985, in response to season 5, episode 3, "Hollywood: Part 3" of the ABC-TV sitcom Happy Days, which was originally broadcast on September 20, 1977. In the episode, the central characters visit Los Angeles, where a water-skiing Fonzie (Henry Winkler) answers a challenge to his bravery by wearing swim trunks and his trademark leather jacket, and jumping over a confined shark. The stunt was created as a way to showcase Winkler's real-life waterskiing skills.

In 1997, Hein created a website, JumptheShark.com, to publish a list of approximately 200 television shows, and his arguments as to the moments each had "jumped the shark". The site became popular, and grew with additional user-contributed examples. Hein sold his company, Jump The Shark, Inc., for "over $1 million" in 2006.

=== Responses ===
==== Ron Howard ====
In 2006, during his contribution to The Interviews: An Oral History of Television, Ron Howard (Richie Cunningham) talked about the Happy Days episode that inspired the phrase:

"I remember Donny Most and I sitting there, looking at the script. Donny was really upset. He said, 'Oh man look at what our show has kind of devolved into. It's not even very funny, and you know Fonz is jumping over a shark' ... and I kept saying 'Hey Donny we're a hit show, relax. You know it's hard to have great episodes one after another. Fonzie jumping over a shark, it's gonna be funny and great ...' I remember thinking that creatively this was not our greatest episode, but I thought it was a pretty good stunt, and I understood why they wanted to do it. And what I remember the most is, it was fun actually driving the speedboat which I did a bit of, noticing that Henry was really a pretty good water skier ... But the thing that has to be remembered about the jumping the shark idea, is that the show went on to be such a massive success for years after that. So, it's kind of a fun expression, and I get a kick out of the fact that they identified that episode (because granted maybe it was pushing things a little too far), but I think a lot of good work was still done after that show, and audiences seemed to really respond to it."

==== Fred Fox Jr. ====
In a 2010 Los Angeles Times article, former Happy Days writer Fred Fox Jr., who wrote the episode that later spawned the phrase, said "Was the [shark jump] episode of Happy Days deserving of its fate? No, it wasn't. All successful shows eventually start to decline, but this was not Happy Days' time." Fox also points not only to the success of that episode ("a huge hit" with over 30 million viewers), but also to the continued popularity of the series.

==== Henry Winkler ====
In a 2019 interview with NPR, Henry Winkler (Fonzie) told Terry Gross that the origin of the stunt began with the fact that he had been a water-skiing instructor as a teenager at a summer camp. Thus, his father used to say to him "every day for years—tell Garry Marshall that you water ski. Dad, I don't think I'm going to do that. No, no. Tell him you water ski. It's very important. I finally tell Garry, my father wants you to know I water ski." Winkler did all of the water skiing for the scene himself, except for the actual jump. The jump was performed by professional water skier Ricky McCormick. Gross then asked Winkler what it was "about that scene or that episode that came to signify when something's time is up—when it's over?" Winkler responded: "You know what? I don't know. To them, the Fonz water skiing was just like the last straw. The only thing is it wasn't to the audience because we were No. 1 for years after that. So it didn't much matter to anybody." In addition, Winkler told TheWrap in 2018 that he is "not embarrassed" by the phrase. He stated that "newspapers would mention jumping the shark ... and they would show a picture of me in my leather jacket and swim shorts water-skiing. And at that time I had great legs. So I thought, 'I don't care.' And we were No. 1 for the next four or five years." As Winkler's character Barry Zuckerkorn, in the sitcom Arrested Development, hopped over a shark in the episode "Motherboy XXX", Winkler also noted that there "was a book, there was a board game and it is an expression that is still used today ... [and] I'm very proud that I am the only actor, maybe in the world, that has jumped the shark twice—once on Happy Days, and once on Arrested Development."

=== Others ===
Some writers, like Daniel Budnik and Rich Pelley, have argued that while Happy Days did eventually (figuratively) "jump the shark", it was not during that episode.

== Broader usage ==
Within television, the term is used often by fans to denote a specific episode of a series that changed the focus or tone of the series for the worse. It is almost inevitable that any show with several seasons to its credit will have fans passionately debating about specific episodes that led to the series "jumping the shark."

The idiom has been more widely used to describe a wide variety of situations, such as the state of advertising in the digital video recorder era, views on rural education policy, and the anomalous pursuit of a company acquisition.

=== Examples ===
In September 2011, Republican presidential candidate Michele Bachmann repeated an anecdote claiming that the HPV vaccine causes "intellectual disability"; this prompted political commentator Rush Limbaugh to say on his radio show, "Michele Bachmann, she might have blown it today. Well, not blown it—she might have jumped the shark today."

In January 2018, political commentator Keith Olbermann criticized the inclusion of esports players on the sports journalism website The Players' Tribune, saying that they "have jumped the shark by publishing pieces by snotty random kids playing children's games" in response to an article by Doublelift, a League of Legends player.

In May 2021, CNBC news anchor Carl Quintanilla proposed that Elon Musk had jumped the shark with his advocacy of cryptocurrencies instead of focusing on Tesla, Inc., as it began to lose market share and its stock price began to plunge. Tesla closed at $196.58 on the day Quintanilla made the comment.

== Related idioms ==
=== Nuking the fridge ===
In 2008, Time identified a term modeled after "jump the shark": "nuke the fridge". Specifically applicable to film, the magazine defined the term: "to exhaust a Hollywood franchise with disappointing sequels."

The phrase derives from a scene in the fourth Indiana Jones film, Indiana Jones and the Kingdom of the Crystal Skull, in which Indiana Jones survives an atomic bomb detonation by fitting himself into a lead-lined refrigerator to shield himself from the explosion. The blast completely annihilates its surroundings, but sends the refrigerator flying a sufficient distance away, allowing Jones to escape unharmed. The scene was criticized as being scientifically implausible.

Within two days of the film's premiere, the phrase "nuke the fridge" had gone viral, describing film scenes that similarly stretched credulity. Director Steven Spielberg later said the scene was "my silly idea" and was glad to have been part of the pop-culture phrase, while the film's executive producer George Lucas took similar credit believing that Jones would have had an even chance of surviving the explosion.

=== Growing the beard ===
"Growing the beard" refers to the inverse of jumping the shark; i.e. the point where a previously disappointing show improved in quality. In the series Star Trek: The Next Generation, the second season is considered to be better in terms of storytelling over the first season. This shift coincided with the character William Riker, who was clean-shaven for the first season, growing a mustache and beard that he retained for the second season and most Star Trek media afterwards.

Another example is Melrose Place, with the introduction of the character Amanda Woodward, played by Heather Locklear.

=== Flanderization ===
Flanderization is the process through which a single element of a character's personality, often an originally mild element, is inflated in importance over the course of a work until it becomes the character's primary defining trait. It is cited as the opposite of character development, or, character derailment. The term was coined by TV Tropes, a wiki that collects and documents descriptions and examples of plot conventions and devices in fiction and pop culture, in reference to the character of Ned Flanders from The Simpsons.

Flanders himself is a complex example of Flanderization, having undergone the process in the middle seasons of the show before once again returning to a similar portrayal to his original one. Originating as "perhaps the only genuinely well-meaning, good-natured person in Springfield", Flanders was originally intended to be an ideal ("annoyingly perfect") neighbor who served as a contrast and foil for Homer Simpson. As a devoutly religious and church-going man, his faith was intended to serve as a contrast to Homer's lack of religious sophistication. However, over the course of the show's run, Flanders was simplified into a religious fundamentalist whose Christianity was his primary defining characteristic.

While Flanderization is primarily discussed in the context of fictional characters, it has also been applied to real people and historical events.
