= Joanie Loves Chachi =

American sitcom television series, Happy Days spinoff

- Genre: Sitcom
- Created by: Lowell Ganz; Garry Marshall
- Developed by: Thomas L. Miller; Robert L. Boyett
- Written by: Cheryl Alu; James Patrick Dunne; Lowell Ganz; Terry Hart; Neil Rosen; George Tricker
- Starring: Erin Moran; Scott Baio; Al Molinaro; Ellen Travolta; Art Metrano
- Opening theme: "You Look at Me", performed by Scott Baio and Erin Moran
- Composer: Howard Pearl
- Country of origin: United States
- Original language: English
- No. of seasons: 2
- No. of episodes: 17

Production
- Executive producers: Lowell Ganz; Robert L. Boyett; Ronny Hallin; Garry Marshall; Edward K. Milkis; Thomas L. Miller
- Producers: James Patrick Dunne; Fred Fox, Jr.
- Camera setup: Multi-camera
- Running time: 22–24 minutes
- Production companies: Paramount Television; Miller-Milkis-Boyett Productions; Henderson Productions

Original release
- Network: ABC
- Release: March 23, 1982 – May 24, 1983

Related
- Love, American Style; Happy Days; Laverne & Shirley; Blansky's Beauties; Mork & Mindy; Out of the Blue

Joanie Loves Chachi is an American sitcom television series and a spin-off of Happy Days that aired on ABC from March 23, 1982, to May 24, 1983. It stars Erin Moran and Scott Baio as the characters Joanie Cunningham and Chachi Arcola, respectively. The series was cancelled after 17 episodes, in its second season, due to a drop in ratings. The two characters and their actors would then return to Happy Days.

== Storyline ==
The series is set in the early to mid-1960s and follows the exploits of Joanie and Chachi as they moved to Chicago and tried to make it on their own with a rock band and a music career at a time when the British Invasion was looming (one episode was titled "Beatlemania"). It mixed the traditional elements of a sitcom with musical performances on each show by Baio and Moran; their characters sang to one another in the opening credit sequence of the show. Their backup band consists of a spaced-out drummer named Bingo and Chachi's blasé cousins Mario and Annette.

The series also starred Ellen Travolta as Louisa Delvecchio, Chachi's mother, and Al Molinaro as Al Delvecchio, Chachi's stepfather (and formerly the owner of Arnold's Drive-In in Happy Days), who opened a restaurant in which Chachi and Joanie performed most of their music. Art Metrano played Chachi's uncle Rico Mastorelli, who was the band's manager and helped Joanie and Chachi advance in their careers. Winifred Freedman played Rico's daughter, Annette, Chachi's cousin and bandmate.

== Production ==
Joanie Loves Chachi was the first Miller-Boyett (and only Garry Marshall–produced) sitcom developed by Thomas L. Miller and Robert L. Boyett, and was created by Lowell Ganz and Garry Marshall. This is the only Garry Marshall/Miller-Boyett sitcom that does not have Charles Fox and/or Norman Gimbel as the show's theme song/music cue composer.

An urban legend circulated that the show was the highest-rated American program ever in Korea due to "chachi" being a Korean word for "penis". In actuality, the show was never broadcast to the general public of Korea, only to U.S. servicemen stationed in South Korea, and has never even been dubbed or subtitled in Korean.

Scott Baio later recalled:

All the Happy Days people had written the first four episodes, when the show got picked up for series, but then they left to go back to Happy Days, and we were stuck with new writers who didn't know us. So that was a problem. And then some of the people on the show had chemical issues, and that was a problem. It was just on and on and on, and it just sort of all crumbled and fell apart. In retrospect, if given the choice again, I would not have done that show. That was just the wrong idea. If I had to do it all over again, I would've waited 'til Happy Days was over until I did anything else. [emphasis in original]

Erin Moran also recalled:

I liked working with the people. But I didn't even want to do it. I wanted to stay on Happy Days. They were running them at the same time.

== Cast ==
- Scott Baio as Chachi Arcola
- Erin Moran as Joanie Cunningham
- Al Molinaro as Al Delvecchio
- Ellen Travolta as Louisa Delvecchio
- Art Metrano as Rico Mastorelli
- Robert Pierce as Bingo Pierce
- Derrel Maury as Mario Mastorelli
- Winifred Freedman as Annette Mastorelli

== Episodes ==
=== Series overview ===
Season	Episodes	Originally released	
Season	Episodes	First released	Last released
1	4	March 23, 1982	April 13, 1982
2	13	September 30, 1982	May 24, 1983

=== Season 1 (1982) ===
No. overall	No. in season	Title	Directed by	Written by	Original release date
1	1	"Chicago"	Tom Trbovich	Lowell Ganz	March 23, 1982
Joanie and Chachi move to Chicago where they audition for a summer singing job, but Joanie is considered too wholesome for the gig. Songs performed: "Do You Want My Love" (sung by Scott Baio) and "Too Young To Know" (sung by Scott Baio and Erin Moran). Special guest stars: Tom Bosley as Howard Cunningham and Marion Ross as Marion Cunningham.
2	2	"The Performance"	Tom Trbovich	Fred Fox, Jr.	March 30, 1982
The band has a big audition for a record producer, but Chachi's attitude causes Joanie to decide to attend her nephew's birthday party in Milwaukee instead of singing with the band. Songs performed: "Puttin' It All Together" (sung by Scott Baio and Erin Moran).
3	3	"I Do, I Don't, I Do"	Joel Zwick	William Bickley & Michael Warren	April 6, 1982
Joanie notices a guy looking at Annette during a performance at Delvecchio's, and she and Chachi introduce Annette and the guy, Wendell. They quickly hit it off and decide to get married within three weeks of their first meeting. Songs performed: "Too Young To Know" and "I'll Take You Back" (sung by Scott Baio and Erin Moran). Note: "I'll Take You Back" appeared as a track from Scott Baio's second album The Boys Are Out Tonight (1983).
4	4	"College Days"	Lowell Ganz	James P. Dunne	April 13, 1982
Chachi becomes jealous when Joanie becomes a favorite among the college fraternity brothers. Songs performed: "Lookin' Good, Feelin' Fine" (sung by Scott Baio and Erin Moran) and "The Lasting Kind" (sung by Erin Moran). Note: "Lookin' Good, Feelin' Fine" was previously performed by Baio and Moran on the Happy Days season 9 episode "No, Thank You".

=== Season 2 (1982–1983) ===
No. overall	No. in season	Title	Directed by	Written by	Original release date
5	1	"Fonzie's Visit"	Joel Zwick	Dana Olsen	September 30, 1982
Fonzie decides to pay a visit to Joanie and Chachi in Chicago. Songs performed: "Makin' Room for a Friend" and "You and Me and Summer" (sung by Scott Baio and Erin Moran). Special guest star: Henry Winkler as Fonzie.
6	2	"Joanie's Roommate"	Joel Zwick	George Tricker & Neil Rosen	October 14, 1982
The Cunninghams are concerned when they call Joanie late at night and Chachi picks up the phone. Special guest stars: Tom Bosley as Howard Cunningham and Marion Ross as Marion Cunningham.
7	3	"One-on-One"	Howard Storm	Larry Levinson	October 21, 1982
Joanie and Chachi argue about gender superiority. Chachi believes that, specifically, men are better than women at basketball, so Joanie challenges him to go one-on-one with her female friend who plays on the school's team. Songs performed: "Our Love Was Meant to Be" (sung by Scott Baio and Erin Moran).
8	4	"No Nudes Is Good Nudes"	Lowell Ganz	Terry Hart	October 28, 1982
Joanie goes out for coffee with her art teacher. She says it isn't a date, but Chachi insists it is. He goes to Joanie's school to check up on her teacher and sees that he's a young blonde. To avoid being seen by Joanie as she and other students enter the room, he tells the teacher that he is the model and soon learns that he will be posing nude. Songs performed: "That's My Kind of Lovin" (sung by Scott Baio and Erin Moran).
9	5	"Everybody Loves Aunt Vanessa"	John Tracy	Steve Granat & Mel Sherer	November 4, 1982
Louisa's friend from high school, Vanessa, who is a record producer, comes for a visit and asks the band to play for her. Mario suspects Vanessa is interested in Chachi for more than just his music. Songs performed: "That's Why I Love You" (sung by Scott Baio and Erin Moran).
10	6	"Beatlemania"	John Tracy	Gary Menteer	November 11, 1982
While visiting her friend who is a nurse, Joanie is convinced she saw Paul McCartney at the hospital. Songs performed: "Wanted for Love" (sung by Scott Baio). Note: "Wanted for Love" appeared as a track from Scott Baio's eponymous debut album (1982). Note 2: This episode was filmed on October 1, 1982.
11	7	"Best Foot Forward"	Henry Winkler	Joan Brooker & Nancy Eddo	November 18, 1982
Against Louisa's wishes, Joanie and Chachi go to an exotic French film and try to leave when Al and Louisa show up to watch the same film. Note: This episode marked Henry Winkler's directional debut.
12	8	"Goodbye Delvecchio's, Hello World"	John Tracy	George Tricker & Neil Rosen	November 25, 1982
After repeatedly being warned about showing up late for and taking excessive breaks during performances, Al and Louisa are left no choice but to fire the band. Songs performed: "I'll Take You Back" (sung by Scott Baio and Erin Moran). Note: "I'll Take You Back" appeared as a track from Scott Baio's second album The Boys Are Out Tonight (1983). Note 2: This episode was filmed on September 17, 1982.
13	9	"Term Paper"	John Tracy	Cheryl Alu & Barry O'Brien	December 2, 1982
Faced with work to do for other classes, Joanie asks Mario to type her 30-page history paper for her. After he finishes it, Mario accidentally burns it on the kitchen stove. When her teacher hands back the graded papers, he notes that Joanie and another student's are exactly the same. Songs performed: "He's So Fine" (sung by Erin Moran).
14	10	"My Dinner with Chachi"	John Tracy	Paula A. Roth	December 9, 1982
After preparing a terrible stew for Chachi, Joanie daydreams about their golden years when he leaves her for a woman that can cook. Not wanting her life to mirror the dream, Joanie enlists the help of Louisa to make a great dinner for Chachi.
15	11	"Christmas Show"	John Tracy	Story by : Cheryl Alu & Nancy Churnin; Teleplay by : Lesa Kite & Cindy Begel	December 16, 1982
On Christmas Eve, a night which Al wanted to spend at home with his close family and friends, Rico books the band to perform on the Christmas Radio Special. After stopping to pick up a hitchhiker on their way to the studio, their van gets stuck in the snow.
16	12	"First Love, Last Love"	John Tracy	Terry Hart	May 17, 1983
Chachi is convinced that Joanie will leave him when her first love comes back on the scene.
17	13	"The Elopement"	John Tracy	James P. Dunne & Millee Taggart	May 24, 1983
After seeing how much in love Louisa's aunt and uncle are after 50 years of marriage, Joanie and Chachi decide to elope. Songs performed: "Love Me Tender" (sung by Scott Baio and Erin Moran).

== Home media ==
On February 4, 2014, CBS DVD (distributed by Paramount) released Joanie Loves Chachi - The Complete Series on DVD in Region 1.

== Reception ==
The show debuted as a mid-season replacement and initially attracted high ratings, benefiting from two factors: it aired immediately following its parent series, Happy Days, and had only reruns competing for its time slot. The ratings plummeted in Season 2 with a move to Thursday nights, which put Joanie Loves Chachi up against CBS' Magnum, P.I., and it was pulled from the schedule by the year's end, with its final two episodes airing in the spring of 1983. The characters were rolled back into Happy Days for that program's final season. ABC determined that the show was losing too much of its lead-in, suggesting low appeal if the show were moved.

In 2010, TV Guide Network listed the show at #17 on its list of 25 Biggest TV Blunders.

=== US TV Ratings ===
Season	Episodes	Start date	End date	Nielsen rank	Nielsen rating
1981-82	4	March 23, 1982	April 13, 1982	4	23.3 (Note: Tied with Three's Company (Joanie Loves Chachi's lead-out))
1982-83	13	September 30, 1982	May 24, 1983	70	N/A
