= Happy Days =

American television sitcom (1974–1984)

- Also known as: Happy Days Again
- Genre: Sitcom
- Created by: Garry Marshall
- Directed by: Jerry Paris; Various (seasons 1–3)
- Starring: Ron Howard; Marion Ross; Anson Williams; Tom Bosley; Henry Winkler; Donny Most; Erin Moran; Pat Morita; Al Molinaro; Scott Baio; Lynda Goodfriend; Cathy Silvers; Ted McGinley; Linda Purl; Heather O'Rourke
- Theme music composer: Max C. Freedman and James E. Myers (1974–1975, opening); Norman Gimbel and Charles Fox (1975–1984, opening; 1974–1984, ending)
- Opening theme: "Rock Around the Clock", performed by Bill Haley & His Comets (1974–1975); "Happy Days", performed by: Pratt & McClain (1975–1983); Bobby Arvon (1983–1984)
- Ending theme: "Happy Days", performed by: Jim Haas, The Ron Hicklin Singers, Stan Farber, Jerry Whitman, Gary Garrett (1974–1975); Pratt & McClain (1975–1983); Bobby Arvon (1983–1984)
- Composers: John Beal; Frank Comstock; Pete King; James Patrick Dunne
- Country of origin: United States
- Original language: English
- No. of seasons: 11
- No. of episodes: 255 (list of episodes)

Production
- Executive producers: Garry Marshall; Thomas L. Miller; Edward K. Milkis; Robert L. Boyett
- Producers: William Bickley; Michael Warren; Anthony W. Marshall; Ronny Hallin; Fred Fox, Jr.
- Camera setup: Single-camera (1974–1975); Multi-camera (1975–1984)
- Running time: 25 minutes
- Production companies: Miller-Milkis Productions (seasons 1–8); Henderson Production Company, Inc. (seasons 6–11); Miller-Milkis-Boyett Productions (seasons 9–11); Paramount Television

Original release
- Network: ABC
- Release: January 15, 1974 – July 19, 1984

Related
- Laverne & Shirley; Blansky's Beauties; Mork & Mindy; Out of the Blue; Joanie Loves Chachi; Arrested Development

Happy Days is an American television sitcom that aired on ABC from January 15, 1974 to July 19, 1984 with a total of 255 half-hour episodes spanning 11 seasons. Created by Garry Marshall, it was one of the most successful series of the 1970s. The series presented life in the 1950s and early 1960s Midwestern United States, where it also featured an ensemble cast, starring Ron Howard as Richie Cunningham, Henry Winkler as his friend Fonzie and Tom Bosley and Marion Ross as Richie's parents, Howard and Marion Cunningham. Although it opened to mixed reviews from critics, Happy Days became successful and popular over time.

The series began as an unsold pilot starring Howard, Ross and Anson Williams, which aired in 1972 as a segment titled "Love and the Television Set" (later retitled "Love and the Happy Days" for syndication) on ABC's anthology show Love, American Style. Based on the pilot, director George Lucas cast Howard as the lead in his 1973 film American Graffiti, causing ABC to take a renewed interest in the pilot. The first two seasons of Happy Days focused on the experiences and dilemmas of teenager Richie Cunningham, his family, and his high school friends, attempting to "honestly depict a wistful look back at adolescence".

Initially a moderate success, the series' ratings began to fall during its second season, causing Marshall to retool it. The new format emphasized broad comedy and spotlighted the previously minor character of Fonzie, a cool biker and high school dropout. Following these changes, Happy Days became the number-one program in television in 1976–1977, Fonzie became one of the most merchandised characters of the 1970s, and Henry Winkler became a major star. The series also spawned a number of spin-offs, including Laverne & Shirley and Mork & Mindy.

== Plot ==
Set in Milwaukee, Wisconsin, during the 1950s and 1960s, the series revolves around teenager Richie Cunningham and his family: his father, Howard, who owns a hardware store; traditional homemaker and mother, Marion; younger sister Joanie Cunningham; Richie's older brother Chuck (briefly in seasons 1 and 2 only, disappearing from storylines afterward); and high school dropout, leather-jacket–clad greaser, suave and promiscuous mechanic Fonzie, who would eventually become Richie's best friend and the Cunninghams' over-the-garage tenant. Season 1 likely takes place in 1955, based on cultural references and popular songs featured in the episodes. In season 2, the episode "The Not Making of the President" is explicitly set during the 1956 presidential election campaign between Adlai Stevenson and Dwight D. Eisenhower, with Richie Cunningham campaigning for Stevenson. The earliest episodes revolve around Richie and his friends, Potsie Weber and Ralph Malph, with Fonzie as a secondary character.

However, as the series progressed, Fonzie proved to be a favorite with viewers, and soon more story lines were written to reflect his growing popularity, Winkler was top billed in the opening credits alongside Howard by season 3. Fonzie befriended Richie and the Cunningham family and, when Richie left the series for military service, Fonzie became the central figure of the show, with Winkler receiving sole top billing. In later seasons, other characters were introduced including Fonzie's young cousin, Chachi Arcola, who became a love interest for Joanie Cunningham.

The series' pilot was originally shown as "Love and the Television Set", later retitled "Love and the Happy Days" for syndication, a one-episode teleplay on the anthology series Love, American Style, aired on February 25, 1972. Happy Days spawned successful television shows Laverne & Shirley and Mork & Mindy as well as three failures: Joanie Loves Chachi, Blansky's Beauties featuring Nancy Walker as Howard's cousin, and Out of the Blue. The show is the basis for the Happy Days musical touring the United States since 2008. The leather jacket worn by Winkler during the series was acquired by the Smithsonian Institution for the permanent collection at the National Museum of American History. The original, light grey McGregor windbreaker Winkler wore during the first season eventually was thrown into the garbage after ABC relented and allowed the Fonzie character to wear a leather jacket.

== Cast ==
Actor	Character	Seasons											
Actor	Character	1	2	3	4	5	6	7	8	9	10	11	Ep
Ron Howard	Richie Cunningham	Main	Main	Main	Main	Main	Main	Main				Guest	170
Anson Williams	Potsie Weber	Main	Main	Main	Main	Main	Main	Main	Main	Main	Main	Main	211
Marion Ross	Marion Cunningham	Main	Main	Main	Main	Main	Main	Main	Main	Main	Main	Main	252
Tom Bosley	Howard Cunningham	Main	Main	Main	Main	Main	Main	Main	Main	Main	Main	Main	255
Henry Winkler	Arthur "Fonzie" Fonzarelli	Recurring	Main	Main	Main	Main	Main	Main	Main	Main	Main	Main	255
Don Most	Ralph Malph	Recurring	Main	Main	Main	Main	Main	Main				Guest	168
Erin Moran	Joanie Cunningham	Recurring	Recurring	Main	Main	Main	Main	Main	Main	Main	Recurring	Main	234
Pat Morita	Matsuo "Arnold" Takahashi			Recurring	Guest		Guest				Recurring	Guest	26
Al Molinaro	Al Delvecchio				Recurring	Recurring	Main	Main	Main	Main	Guest	Guest	145
Scott Baio	Chachi Arcola					Recurring	Main	Main	Main	Main	Recurring	Main	131
Lynda Goodfriend	Lori Beth Cunningham					Recurring	Recurring	Recurring	Main	Main		Guest	66
Cathy Silvers	Jenny Piccolo								Recurring	Recurring	Main	Guest	55
Ted McGinley	Roger Phillips								Recurring	Recurring	Main	Main	61
Linda Purl	Ashley Pfister										Main		19
Heather O'Rourke	Heather Pfister										Recurring		12
Main Recurring Guest

== Characters ==
=== Main ===
- Richie Cunningham — The protagonist for the first seven seasons of the series (1974–1980), introduced as a nice, soft-spoken teenager who often gets into trouble over his attempts to meet girls. When Ron Howard left the show after signing an exclusive contract with NBC, Richie was written out by leaving to join the United States Army. He marries his girlfriend, Lori Beth, in season eight by phone so that she will be able to join him at his post in Greenland, while Fonzie stands in for him in the wedding. Howard returned for guest appearances as Richie during the show's final season. He came back with Lori Beth and their son, Richie Jr., and Ralph in the season 11 two-part episode, "Welcome Home", and then left for California with Lori Beth and Richie Jr. to pursue a career in screenwriting. He also returned in "Passages", when he and his family attended Joanie and Chachi's wedding.
- Marion Cunningham (née Kelp) — Wife of Howard, mother of Chuck, Richie, and Joanie, and a traditional homemaker. She is the only character who is allowed to call Fonzie by his real first name, Arthur, which she does affectionately. She sometimes gets tired of being at home, such as in "Marion Rebels" where she gets into an argument with Howard and briefly gets a job as a waitress at Arnold's. Marion was one of only four characters to remain with the show throughout its entire run.
- Howard Cunningham — Husband of Marion, father of Chuck, Richie, and Joanie, business owner of a hardware store called "Cunningham's Hardware", he is a lodge member, and family man. Howard is one of only two characters (the other being Fonzie) to appear in every episode of the series.
- Joanie Cunningham — Richie's younger sister. In early seasons, she is sometimes snooping on Richie's activities and would occasionally be sent to her room by her parents. She is affectionately called "Shortcake" by Fonzie.
- Arthur Fonzarelli, a.k.a. The Fonz or Fonzie — Initially a secondary or recurring character, billed in the end credits, during the first season, he became a popular breakout character and was promoted to front billing by the second season. Fonzarelli's "Fonzie" nickname and comeback phrase, "Sit on it", were created by the show's producer Bob Brunner. His parents abandoned him as a child and his grandmother raised him from the age of four.
- Warren "Potsie" Weber — Richie's best friend and an aspiring and talented singer.
- Ralph Malph — In the first season, Ralph was intended as more of a secondary character, billed in the end credits, along with Winkler and Moran, but by season 2, Ralph was front billed with them.
- Mitsumo "Arnold" Takahashi (Noriyuki "Pat" Morita) (seasons 1-3, 10–11: 26 episodes) is the owner of Arnold's Drive-In (1975–76). Morita also played "Arnold" as a guest star in 1977 and 1979 before returning as a recurring character after Al Molinaro departed in 1982.
- Chachi Arcola (Scott Baio) — Fonzie's younger cousin and later Al Delvecchio's stepson. Fonzie acts as his older brother/father figure. He has much of Fonzie's smoothness and charisma, "wah wah wah" being his catchphrase. Chachi becomes "one of the guys", joining Richie, Potsie, Ralph, and Fonzie in their antics and as their bandmate/drummer.
- Jenny Piccalo (Cathy Silvers) — Joanie's boy-crazy best friend (1980–1983), frequently mentioned but never seen in early episodes. She made her first on-screen appearance in the eighth season and remained a recurring character through the ninth season, becoming a regular during the tenth season in 1983. She returned as a guest star in the 1984 series finale. Jenny's father, played by Cathy Silvers' real-life father Phil Silvers, appeared in one episode (S9E8 "Just a Piccalo").
- Roger Phillips (Ted McGinley) — Marion's nephew; coach and teacher at Jefferson High, until the episode "Vocational Education" when he became principal at Patton High. Introduced in 1980 after Richie left the show as a recurring character.
- Lori Beth Allen-Cunningham (Lynda Goodfriend) — Richie's girlfriend and later his wife (1977–82). She married Richie by phone in season eight. Fonzie helped Lori Beth deliver her baby in "Little Baby Cunningham". She returned as a guest star in the final season, where she is pregnant with her second baby.
- Ashley Pfister (Linda Purl) — Divorced mother who becomes Fonzie's steady girlfriend until they break up offscreen sometime before "Where the Guys Are". (Purl also portrays Richie's part-time girlfriend Gloria in season 2).
- Al Delvecchio (Al Molinaro) is the owner and cook of Arnold's Drive-In from season 4 to season 9. He bought the restaurant from its original owner, Matsuo "Arnold" Takahashi, after Arnold got married and moved away in season 4. Al eventually married Chachi's mother, Louisa. He had a sighing catchphrase of "Yep-yep-yep...". Al and Louisa moved to Chicago with Joanie and Chachi and opened a restaurant in Chicago where Joanie and Chachi perform. When Joanie and Chachi move back to Milwaukee, Al and Louisa remain in Chicago.

For much of the series, Al would talk about his former love, Rosa Coletti, and how she left him for a tie salesman. Al would meet Rosa again in the eighth-season episode, "If You Knew Rosa". She was played by Nancy Marvy.

=== Minor/recurring ===
- Marsha Simms (Beatrice Colen) (seasons 1–3, 5; 22 episodes) — A carhop waitress in the first 3 seasons with comic sides and plot development appearances. She returned for a flashback (guest) appearance in the episode "Our Gang".
- Bobby Melner (Harris Kal) (seasons 8–11; 19 episodes) — Friend of Chachi and Joanie seen in episodes after Richie and Ralph left the show. He is a student in Fonzie's auto shop class, as well as in Roger's health class. At one point, he was also on the Jefferson High basketball team, and performed in a band with Joanie and Chachi.
- K.C. Cunningham (Crystal Bernard) (season 10; 15 episodes) — Howard's niece. She moves in with Howard and Marion after Joanie leaves for Chicago. She left an all-girls boarding school in Texas because it closed down.
- Leopold "Flip" Phillips (Billy Warlock) (seasons 9–10; 13 episodes) — Roger's rebellious younger brother. He usually wears a shirt cut off over his bellybutton.
- Tommy (Kevin Sullivan) (seasons 8–11; 13 episodes) — Another friend of Chachi and Joanie in episodes after Ron Howard and Don Most left the show. Like Bobby, Tommy is a student in Fonzie's auto shop class, as well as in Roger's health class.
- Heather Pfister (Heather O'Rourke) (season 10; 12 episodes) — Ashley Pfister's daughter. Initially she does not get along with Fonzie, but gradually learns to accept him as a father figure.
- Charles "Chuck" Cunningham (Gavan O'Herlihy, Randolph Roberts) (seasons 1–2; 11 episodes) — The oldest son of Howard and Marion Cunningham and older brother of Richie and Joanie, Chuck is a college student and basketball player. He is rarely seen and disappears without explanation in season three, never to be seen nor referenced again after season 2's "Fish and Fins". The character's disappearance gave rise to the term "Chuck Cunningham Syndrome", used to describe TV characters that disappear from shows without an in-narrative explanation and are nowhere to be seen or mentioned again. Gavan O'Herlihy played Chuck, but then he asked to leave the series. He was replaced by Randolph Roberts. In several late-season episodes, Howard and Marion say they are "very proud of our two children", with no on-screen reference to Chuck.
- Eugene Belvin (Denis Mandel) (seasons 8–9; 10 episodes) — Nerdy classmate of Joanie and Chachi, and twin brother of Melvin Belvin. He takes Fonzie's auto shop class and has a crush on Jenny Piccolo. Despite being a general stooge to his classmates at Jefferson High, he frequently tags along with Joanie and Chachi's circle of friends.
- "Bag" Zombroski (Neil J. Schwartz) (seasons 1–4; 9 episodes) — A Jefferson High schoolmate, drummer of Richie's band and a leader of a jacket club called "The Demons".
- Police Officer Kirk / Army Reserve Major Kirk (Ed Peck) (seasons 3–10; 9 episodes) — Fonzie's nemesis and antagonist, who is eager to demonstrate his inflated sense of authority, and on the watch for delinquents and "pinkos" (communists). Kirk takes over as acting sheriff following the untimely death of Sheriff Flanaghan.
- Wendy (Misty Rowe) (season 2; 8 episodes) — A carhop from Arnold's in season two. She is paired with Marsha Simms in 5 episodes.
- Trudy (Tita Bell) (seasons 1–4; 8 episodes) — A Jefferson High classmate, Potsie's and Fonzie's date in various episodes
- Melvin Belvin (Scott Bernstein) (seasons 9–10; 8 episodes) — A nerdy classmate of Joanie and Chachi, and twin brother of Eugene Belvin. Like his brother, Melvin frequently tags along with Joanie's and Chachi's circle of friends.
- Leather Tuscadero (Suzi Quatro) (seasons 5–6; 7 episodes) — A musician, younger sister of Pinky Tuscadero and a former juvenile delinquent, she forms her own girl group called "Leather and the Suedes".
- Jennifer Jerome (Lorrie Mahaffey) (seasons 5–6; 6 episodes) — Potsie's steady girlfriend. Mahaffey was Anson Williams' then wife.
- Laverne De Fazio (Penny Marshall) and Shirley Feeney (Cindy Williams) (seasons 3, 6–7; 5 episodes) — Dating interest of Fonzie, Laverne and her friend Shirley appeared prominently in three episodes during season three ("A Date with Fonzie", "Football Frolics", and "Fonzie the Superstar"), which led to the Marshall and Williams starring in the spin-off series Laverne & Shirley; they also made guest appearances in season six's "Fonzie's Funeral (Part 2)" and season seven's "Shotgun Wedding" (Part 1) (the second part of "Shotgun Wedding" concluded on a crossover episode of Laverne and Shirley.)
- Louisa Arcola-Delvecchio (Ellen Travolta) (seasons 8–11; 5 episodes) — Mother of Chachi Arcola and aunt of Fonzie. She marries Al Delvecchio and they move to Chicago.
- Gloria (Linda Purl) (season 2; 5 episodes) — Richie's occasional girlfriend in season two.
- Dr. Mickey Malph (Alan Oppenheimer, Jack Dodson) (season 3–4, 7; 4 episodes) — Ralph's father, an optometrist and, like his son, a self-styled comedian. He briefly separates from his wife Minnie, but apparently resolves the issues with her after a talk with Ralph.
- Raymond "Spike" Fonzarelli (Danny Butch) (seasons 2–4; 4 episodes) — Fonzie's cousin (often referred to as his nephew, but Fonzie explains that he could not be his nephew, as Fonzie was an only child) and his copycat. He goes on a date with Joanie in "Not with My Sister, You Don't" and made only fleeting appearances before the introduction of Chachi.
- Grandma Nussbaum (Frances Bay) (seasons 3, 9–11: 4 episodes) — Chachi Arcola and Fonzie's grandmother. Grandma Nussbaum was played by Lillian Bronson in the season 3 episode "Fonzie Moves In".
- Carol "Pinky" Tuscadero (Roz Kelly) (season 4; 3 episodes) — Former girlfriend of Fonzie and a traveling demolition derby driver.
- Clarence (Gary Friedkin) (season 10; 3 episodes) — A cook at Arnold's who is referred to several times throughout the show, but never actually seen until the episode "A Woman Not Under the Influence". There, it is revealed that Clarence is a little person.
- Bill "Sticks" Downey (John Anthony Bailey) (season 3; 2 episodes) — Friend of Fonzie, Richie, Potsie, and Ralph and drummer for their band, hence his nickname "Sticks", though he claims he got the nickname because he was skinny.

== Production ==
Happy Days originated during a time of 1950s nostalgic interest as evident in 1970s film, television, and music. In late winter of 1971, Michael Eisner was snowed in at Newark airport where he bumped into Tom Miller, head of development at Paramount. Eisner has stated that he told Miller, "Tom, this is ridiculous. We're wasting our time here. Let's write a show." The script treatment that came out of that did not sell. But in spite of the market research department telling them that the 1950s theme would not work, they decided to redo it, and this was accepted as a pilot. This unsold pilot was filmed in late 1971 and titled New Family in Town, with Harold Gould in the role of Howard Cunningham, Marion Ross as Marion, Ron Howard as Richie, Anson Williams as Potsie, Ric Carrott as Charles "Chuck" Cunningham, and Susan Neher as Joanie. Paramount passed on making it into a weekly series, and the pilot was recycled with the title Love and the Television Set (later retitled Love and the Happy Days for syndication), for presentation on the television anthology series Love, American Style. Also in 1971, the musical Grease had a successful opening in Chicago, and by the following year became successful on Broadway. In 1972, George Lucas asked to view the pilot to determine if Ron Howard would be suitable to play a teenager in American Graffiti, then in pre-production. Lucas immediately cast Howard in the film, which became one of the top-grossing films of 1973. With the movie's success generating a renewed interest in the 1950s era (although the film was set in 1962), TV show creator Garry Marshall and ABC recast the unsold pilot to turn Happy Days into a series. According to Marshall in an interview, executive producer Tom Miller said while developing the sitcom, "If we do a TV series that takes place in another era, and when it goes into reruns, then it won't look old." This made sense to Marshall while on the set of the show.

Gould had originally been tapped to reprise the role of Howard Cunningham on the show. However, during a delay before the start of production he found work performing in a play abroad and when he was notified the show was ready to begin production, he declined to return because he wanted to honor his commitment. Bosley was then offered the role.

For the role of Fonzie it was narrowed down to Micky Dolenz and Henry Winkler but the role eventually went to the latter, Dolenz later said that Winkler "deserved it".

=== Production and scheduling notes ===
- Jerry Paris, who played next-door neighbor Jerry Helper on The Dick Van Dyke Show and directed 84 episodes of that series, directed every episode of Happy Days from season three on, except for three episodes in season three ("Jailhouse Rock", "Dance Contest", and "Arnold's Wedding").

==== Sets ====
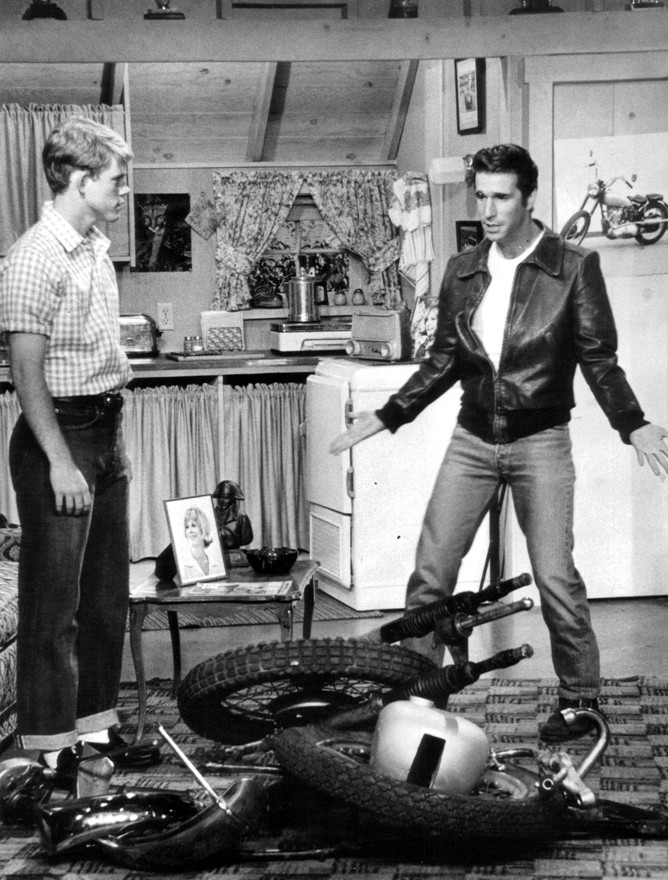
Richie and Fonzie view his destroyed motorcycle in his living room, 1976. Fonzie's apartment was over the Cunninghams' garage.

The Cunninghams' official address is 565 North Clinton Drive, Milwaukee, Wisconsin. The house that served as the exterior of the Cunningham residence is actually located at 565 North Cahuenga Boulevard (south of Melrose Avenue) in Los Angeles, several blocks from the Paramount lot on Melrose Avenue.

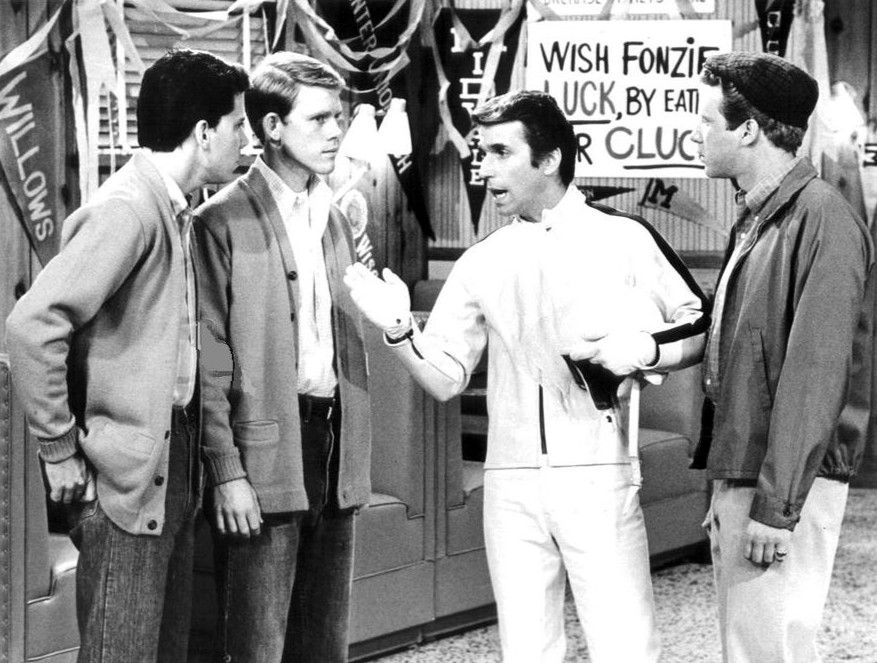
Potsie, Richie, Fonzie, and Ralph Malph at Arnold's, 1975

In 2004, two decades after the first set was destroyed, the Happy Days 30th Anniversary Reunion requested that the reunion take place in Arnold's. The set was rebuilt by production designer James Yarnell based on the original floor plan. The reunion special was taped at CBS Television City's Bob Barker Studio in September 2004.

=== Theme music ===
Season one used a newly recorded version of "Rock Around the Clock" by Bill Haley & His Comets (recorded in the fall of 1973) as the opening theme song. This recording was not commercially released at the time, although the original 1954 recording returned to the American Billboard charts in 1974 as a result of the song's use on the show. The "Happy Days" recording had its first commercial release in 2005 by the German label Hydra Records. (When Happy Days entered syndication in 1979, the series was retitled Happy Days Again and used an edited version of the 1954 recording instead of the 1973 version.) In some prints intended for reruns and overseas broadcasts, as well as on the Season 2 DVD set release and later re-releases of the Season 1 DVD set, the original "Rock Around the Clock" opening theme is replaced by the more standard "Happy Days" theme, because of music rights issues.

The show's closing theme song in seasons one and two was a fragment from "Happy Days" (although in a different recording with a different lyric from that which would become the standard version), whose music was composed by Charles Fox and whose lyric was written by Norman Gimbel. According to SAG, this version was performed by Jim Haas on lead vocals, The Ron Hicklin Singers, Stan Farber, Jerry Whitman, and Gary Garrett on backing vocals, and studio musicians.

From seasons three to ten inclusive, a longer version of "Happy Days" replaced "Rock Around the Clock" at the beginning of the show. Released as a single in 1976 by Pratt & McClain, "Happy Days" cracked the Top 5. The show itself finished the 1976–77 television season at No. 1, ending the five-year Nielsen reign of All in the Family.

For the show's 11th and final season (1983–84), the theme was rerecorded in a more modern style. It featured Bobby Arvon on lead vocals, with several back-up vocalists. To accompany this new version, new opening credits were filmed, and the flashing Happy Days logo was reanimated to create an overall "new" feel which incorporated 1980s sensibilities with 1950s nostalgia (although by this time the show was set in 1965).

=== Merchandising revenue lawsuit ===
On April 19, 2011, Happy Days co-stars Erin Moran, Don Most, Marion Ross and Anson Williams, as well as the estate of Tom Bosley (who died in 2010), filed a $10 million breach-of-contract lawsuit against CBS, which owns the show, claiming they had not been paid for merchandising revenues owed under their contracts. The cast members claimed they had not received revenues from show-related items, including comic books, T-shirts, scrapbooks, trading cards, games, lunch boxes, dolls, toy cars, magnets, greeting cards and DVDs where their images appear on the box covers. Under their contracts, they were supposed to be paid 5% of the net proceeds of merchandising if their sole image were used, and half that amount if they were in a group. CBS said it owed the actors $8,500 and $9,000 each, most of it from slot machine revenues, but the group said they were owed millions. The lawsuit was initiated after Ross was informed by a friend playing slots at a casino of a Happy Days machine on which players win the jackpot when five Marion Rosses are rolled.

In October 2011, a judge rejected the group's fraud claim, which meant they could not receive millions of dollars in potential damages. On June 5, 2012, a judge denied a motion filed by CBS to have the case thrown out, which meant it would go to trial on July 17 if the matter was not settled by then. In July 2012, the actors settled their lawsuit with CBS. Each received a payment of $65,000 and a promise by CBS to continue honoring the terms of their contracts.

== Legacy ==
In 1978, actor Robin Williams made his screen debut during the fifth season of Happy Days, as the character "Mork" in the episode "My Favorite Orkan". Sought after as a last-minute cast replacement for a departing actor, Williams impressed the producer with his quirky sense of humor when he sat on his head when asked to take a seat for the audition. While portraying Mork on Happy Days, Williams improvised much of his dialogue and physical comedy, speaking in a high, nasal voice, and he made the most of the script. The cast and crew, as well as TV network executives were deeply impressed with his performance. As such, the executives moved quickly to get the performer on contract just four days later before competitors could make their own offers.

In 1980, the National Museum of American History, Smithsonian Institution asked Winkler to donate one of Fonzie's leather jackets.

In 1985, Jon Hein developed the phrase jumping the shark in response to the season 5 episode "Hollywood: Part 3", written by Fred Fox Jr., which aired on September 20, 1977. In this episode, Fonzie jumps over a shark while on water-skis. The phrase is used to suggest that a creative outlet appears to be making a misguided attempt at generating new attention or publicity for something that is perceived to be once, but no longer, widely popular. In a 2019 interview with NPR, Terry Gross asked Winkler what it was "about that scene or that episode that came to signify when something's time is up – when it's over?" Winkler responded: "You know what? I don't know. To them, the Fonz water skiing was just like the last straw. The only thing is it wasn't to the audience because we were number one for years after that. So it didn't much matter to anybody." In addition, he told TheWrap in 2018 that he is "not embarrassed" by the phrase. He stated that "newspapers would mention jumping the shark... and they would show a picture of me in my leather jacket and swim shorts water-skiing. And at that time I had great legs. So I thought, 'I don't care.' And we were number one for the next four or five years." As his character Barry Zuckerkorn (in the sitcom Arrested Development) hopped over a shark in Episode 13 of the second season, Winkler also noted that there "was a book, there was a board game and it is an expression that is still used today ... [and] I'm very proud that I am the only actor, maybe in the world, that has jumped the shark twice – once on Happy Days, and once on Arrested Development."

In 1999 TV Guide ranked Fonzie as number 4 on its 50 Greatest TV Characters of All Time list.

In a 2001 poll conducted by Channel 4 in the UK, the Fonz was ranked 13th on their list of the 100 Greatest TV Characters.

In 2008, American artist Gerald P. Sawyer unveiled the Bronze Fonz (a public artwork) on the Milwaukee Riverwalk in downtown Milwaukee, Wisconsin.

In December 2023, Variety ranked Happy Days number 87 on its list of the 100 greatest TV shows of all time.

== Home media ==
Paramount Home Entertainment and CBS DVD have released the first six seasons of Happy Days on DVD in Region 1, as of December 2, 2014. For the second season, CBS features music replacements due to copyright issues, including the theme song "Rock Around the Clock". ('The Complete First Season' retains the original opening, as it was released before CBS was involved). Only seasons 1, 3 and 4 of the DVD release contain the original music. The sixth season was released on December 2, 2014. The remaining 5 seasons have not been released.

The season 7 premiere "Shotgun Wedding: Part 1" was also released on the Laverne & Shirley season 5 DVD. To date, this is the last episode released on home media.

The first four seasons have also been released on DVD in the UK (Region 2) and Australia (Region 4).

DVD name	No. of episodes	Release dates		
DVD name	No. of episodes	Region 1	Region 2	Region 4
The Complete First Season	16	August 17, 2004	August 27, 2007	September 19, 2007
The Second Season	23	April 17, 2007	November 12, 2007	March 6, 2008
The Third Season	24	November 27, 2007	April 7, 2008	September 4, 2008
The Fourth Season	25	December 9, 2008	January 9, 2011	February 5, 2009
The Fifth Season	27	May 20, 2014	TBA	TBA
The Sixth Season	27	December 2, 2014	TBA	TBA
Seasons 1–4	88	—N/a		1 December 2011
Seasons 1–6	142	January 11, 2016	—N/a	
Seasons 1–6 (reissue)	142	October 13, 2020	—N/a	

== Reunion specials ==
There have been two reunion specials which aired on ABC: the first was The Happy Days Reunion Special originally aired in March 1992, followed by Happy Days: 30th Anniversary Reunion in February 2005 to commemorate the program's 30th anniversary. Both were set up in interview/clip format.

== Spin-offs ==
Happy Days resulted in seven different spin-off series, including three that were animated: Laverne & Shirley, Blansky's Beauties, Mork & Mindy, Out of the Blue, Joanie Loves Chachi, The Fonz and the Happy Days Gang (animated), Laverne & Shirley in the Army (animated), and Mork & Mindy/Laverne & Shirley/Fonz Hour (animated).

- The most successful of these spin-offs, Laverne & Shirley (1976–83) starring Penny Marshall and Cindy Williams, respectively, also took place in early/mid-1960s Milwaukee. As Shotz Brewery workers, modeled after the Miller, Schlitz, and Pabst Breweries once located in Milwaukee, Laverne and Shirley find themselves in adventures with The Fonz, Lenny and Squiggy and even the Cunninghams also living in the midwestern city. The two starring characters eventually moved to Los Angeles in the show's later years. Penny Marshall was the sister of producer Garry Marshall. Happy Days and Laverne & Shirley had a crossover episode, "Shotgun Wedding", in which Richie and Fonzie get into trouble with a farmer for courting his daughters, and Laverne and Shirley try to help them. Part one is the season seven premiere of Happy Days and part two is the season five premiere of Laverne & Shirley.
- After Robin Williams appeared as Mork in "My Favorite Orkan", he was given his own sitcom, Mork & Mindy (1978–82). In this series, Mork is an alien from the planet Ork, who lands in 1970s Boulder, Colorado, to study humans. He moves in with Pam Dawber's character of Mindy McConnell.
- Joanie Loves Chachi (1982–83) was a show about Richie's younger sister Joanie and Fonzie's younger cousin Chachi's relationship during their years as musicians in Chicago. While commonly believed that the show was canceled due to low ratings, the program finished in the Top 20 its first season, but ABC determined that the show was losing too much of its lead-in, suggesting low appeal if the show were moved (a suggestion that came to be realized, as the show's ratings dropped dramatically after a move to another time slot in its second season). This type of cancellation seemed strange in the early 1980s, but soon became a commonplace part of TV audience research.
- Out of the Blue (1979) is a spin-off of Happy Days, though a scheduling error had the series airing prior to the main character's introduction on Happy Days.
- Blansky's Beauties (1977) starred Nancy Walker as former Las Vegas showgirl Nancy Blansky. One week before the show's premiere, the Blansky character appeared on Happy Days as a cousin of Howard Cunningham. Scott Baio and Lynda Goodfriend co-starred before joining Happy Days the following fall, and Pat Morita reprised his role of Arnold. Similarly, Eddie Mekka of Laverne & Shirley played the cousin of his Carmine character, while pulling double duty as a regular in both shows.

Spin-off pilots that did not succeed include The Ralph and Potsie Show as well as The Pinky Tuscadero Show. A pilot for a sequel titled Happy Days '92 was shot but not picked up for broadcast.

== List of songs performed on Happy Days ==
Episode	Title	Song(s)	Performed by
1x10	"Give the Band a Hand"	"All Shook Up"	Anson Williams
2x19	"Fonzie Joins the Band"	"Splish Splash"	Anson Williams
2x20	"Fish and the Fins"	"Young Blood"	Flash Cadillac and the Continental Kids
3x10	"A Date with Fonzie"	"Great Balls of Fire"	Anson Williams
3x12	"Fonzie's New Friend"	"Honeycomb"	Anson Williams
3x13	"They Call It Potsie Love"	"Put Your Head on My Shoulder"	Anson Williams
3x13	"They Call It Potsie Love"	"Whole Lotta Shakin' Goin' On"	Anson Williams
3x19	"Fonzie the Superstar"	"By the Light of the Silvery Moon"	Pat Morita, Penny Marshall and Cindy Williams
3x19	"Fonzie the Superstar"	"Heartbreak Hotel"	Henry Winkler
4x01	"Fonzie Loves Pinky, Part 1"	"You're Sixteen"	Anson Williams
4x02	"Fonzie Loves Pinky, Part 2"	"America the Beautiful"	Anson Williams
4x08	"They Shoot Fonzies, Don't They?"	"Venus"	Anson Williams
4x08	"They Shoot Fonzies, Don't They?"	"Rockin' Robin"	Anson Williams
4x08	"They Shoot Fonzies, Don't They?"	"Anniversary Song"	Donny Most
4x09	"The Muckrakers"	"Sh-Boom"	Anson Williams, Donny Most, Ron Howard and Al Molinaro
4x09	"The Muckrakers"	"You'll Never Walk Alone"	Anson Williams
4x12	"Fonzie's Old Lady"	"It's Late"	Anson Williams
4x12	"Fonzie's Old Lady"	"Splish Splash"	Anson Williams and Donny Most
4x18	"Graduation, Part 1"	"Deeply"	Anson Williams
4x21	"Joanie's Weird Boyfriend"	"McNamara's Band"	Anson Williams
4x21	"Joanie's Weird Boyfriend"	"When Irish Eyes Are Smiling"	Anson Williams, Donny Most and Ron Howard
4x25	"Fonzie's Baptism"	"Faith of our Fathers"	Anson Williams, Donny Most, Ron Howard and Erin Moran
5x01	"Hollywood, Part 1"	"Will You Love Me Tomorrow"	Anson Williams
5x08	"Fonzie and Leather Tuscadero, Part 1"	"Cat Size"	Suzi Quatro
5x08	"Fonzie and Leather Tuscadero, Part 1"	"All Shook Up"	Suzi Quatro
5x09	"Fonzie and Leather Tuscadero, Part 2"	"Heartbreak Hotel"	Suzi Quatro
5x09	"Fonzie and Leather Tuscadero, Part 2"	"Devil Gate Drive"	Suzi Quatro
5x11	"Bye Bye Blackball"	"My Dream Girl Of Phi Kappa Nu"	Anson Williams
5x12	"Requiem for a Malph"	"Calendar Girl"	Anson Williams
5x12	"Requiem for a Malph"	"Down by the Old Mill Stream"	Tom Bosley, Marion Ross, Ron Howard, Erin Moran and Henry Winkler
5x14	"Grandpa's Visit"	"Down South in New Orleans"	Danny Thomas
5x14	"Grandpa's Visit"	"Sonny Boy"	Danny Thomas
5x14	"Grandpa's Visit"	"When the Saints Go Marching In"	Danny Thomas
5x15	"Potsie Gets Pinned"	"Pinning Song"	Anson Williams and Lorrie Mahaffey
5x17	"Marion's Misgivings"	"Wild One"	Anson Williams
5x17	"Marion's Misgivings"	"I May Be Too Young"	Suzi Quatro
5x18	"Richie Almost Dies"	"Believe"	Suzi Quatro
5x20	"Be My Valentine"	"Save Your Last Kiss for Me"	Anson Williams and Lorrie Mahaffey
5x20	"Be My Valentine"	"My Funny Valentine"	Donny Most
5x20	"Be My Valentine"	"Thank Heaven for Little Girls"	Scott Baio
5x20	"Be My Valentine"	"I Remember It Well"	Tom Bosley and Marion Ross
5x20	"Be My Valentine"	"Isn't It Romantic?"	Al Molinaro
5x26	"Rules to Date By"	"Happy Birthday Sweet Sixteen"	Anson Williams
5x27	"Fonzie for the Defense"	"The Three Caballeros"	Anson Williams, Donny Most and Ron Howard
6x02	"Westward Ho!, Part 2"	"Rodeo Song"	Anson Williams
6x03	"Westward Ho!, Part 3"	"Tumbling Tumbleweeds"	Anson Williams
6x07	"Sweet Sixteen"	"Happy Birthday Sweet Sixteen"	Anson Williams
6x07	"Sweet Sixteen"	"Put Your Head on My Shoulder"	Anson Williams
6x09	"The Evil Eye"	"The Monster Mash"	Anson Williams, Donny Most and Ron Howard
6x10	"The Claw Meets the Fonz"	"Maybe Baby"	Anson Williams
6x13	"The Kissing Bandit"	"Everyday"	Anson Williams
6x19	"Stolen Melodies"	"I Can't Stand You Anymore"	Fred Fox, Jr.
6x19	"Stolen Melodies"	"Moonlight Love"	Suzi Quatro
6x19	"Stolen Melodies"	"Do the Fonzie"	Suzi Quatro
6x21	"Marion: Fairy Godmother"	"Hey Little Girl"	Anson Williams
6x21	"Marion: Fairy Godmother"	"Every Hour, Every Day"	Anson Williams and Lorrie Mahaffey
6x20	"Married Strangers"	"Cause of You"	Anson Williams
6x26	"Chachi's Incredo Wax"	"Take Good Care of My Baby"	Anson Williams
6x27	"Potsie Quits School"	"Pump Your Blood"	Anson Williams
7x08	"Burlesque"	"Top Banana"	Tom Bosley
7x08	"Burlesque"	"Girl of Our Nations"	Anson Williams
7x08	"Burlesque"	"It's Delightful"	Donny Most and Henry Winkler
7x10	"King Richard's Big Night"	"Hello Mary Lou"	Anson Williams
7x10	"King Richard's Big Night"	"Let's Twist Again"	Anson Williams
7x11	"Fonzie vs. The She-Devils"	"Beer Barrel Polka"	Tom Bosley, Marion Ross, Erin Moran and Henry Winkler
7x11	"Fonzie vs. The She-Devils"	"That Old Gang of Mine"	Tom Bosley, Marion Ross, Ron Howard and Erin Moran
7x12	"The Mechanic"	"Tossin' and Turnin'"	Anson Williams
7x14	"Here Comes the Bride"	"Wedding Song"	Anson Williams
7x17	"Hot Stuff"	"For He's a Jolly Good Fellow"	Tom Bosley, Marion Ross, Ron Howard, Anson Williams, Donny Most, Erin Moran and Lynda Goodfriend
7x18	"The New Arnold's"	"Let's Twist Again"	Anson Williams
7x23	"A Potsie is Born"	"Surfin' Safari"	Anson Williams
7x23	"A Potsie is Born"	"Mack the Knife"	Anson Williams
7x23	"A Potsie is Born"	"Oh, Boy!"	Anson Williams and Gail Edwards
8x07	"And The Winner Is"	"The Jefferson Anthem"	Anson Williams and Al Molinaro
8x12	"Broadway It's Not"	"You Look at Me"	Erin Moran and Scott Baio
8x19	"R.C. and L.B. Forever"	"Wedding Song"	Anson Williams
8x22	"American Musical"	"Long After You'll Always Have Me"	Erin Moran and Scott Baio
8x22	"American Musical"	"Jail Song"	Anson Williams, Scott Baio, Tom Bosley, Henry Winkler, Al Molinaro and Ted McGinley
8x22	"American Musical"	"A Toast To My Country And Home"	Al Molinaro, Lynda Goodfriend and Cathy Silvers
8x22	"American Musical"	"Youre Gonna Make It"	Tom Bosley, Marion Ross and Ted McGinley
9x02	"Home Movies, Part 2"	"Every Time, Every Place"	Anson Williams
9x09	"No, Thank You"	"Lookin' Good, Feelin' Fine"	Erin Moran and Scott Baio
9x12	"To Beanie or Not to Beanie"	"Call"	Erin Moran and Scott Baio
9x14	"Grandma Nussbaum"	"How Am I Gonna Sing"	Tom Bosley, Marion Ross, Erin Moran, Lynda Goodfriend, Ted McGinley and Pat O'Brien
9x15	"Poobah Doo Dah"	"Twistin' the Night Away"	Erin Moran and Scott Baio
9x15	"Poobah Doo Dah"	"The Way You Look Tonight"	Tom Bosley and Marion Ross
9x15	"Poobah Doo Dah"	"Goodbye, My Coney Island Baby"	Anson Williams, Scott Baio, Al Molinaro and Ted McGinley
9x15	"Poobah Doo Dah"	"Venus"	Frankie Avalon
9x16	"A Touch of Classical"	"Twist and Shout"	Erin Moran and Scott Baio
9x18	"Great Expectations"	"Time Turned Around"	Erin Moran and Scott Baio
9x20	"Chachi's Future"	"Princess of 3rd Street"	Scott Baio
10x06	"Who Gives a Hootenanny?"	"Come Go With Me"	Erin Moran and Scott Baio
10x08	"Such a Nice Girl"	"Blue Moon"	Pat Morita
10x14	"Prisoner of Love"	"Stop! In the Name of Love"	Crystal Bernard, Cathy Silvers and Julie Paris
10x15	"Life is More Important Than Show Business"	"The Loco-Motion"	Erin Moran and Scott Baio
11x04	"Welcome Home, Part 1"	"Blueberry Hill"	Anson Williams, Ron Howard, Donny Most and Henry Winkler

== In other media ==
=== Books ===
A series of novels based on characters and dialog of the series was written by William Johnston and published by Tempo Books in the 1970s.

=== Comic books ===
Western Publishing published a Happy Days comic book series from March 1979 to February 1980 under their Gold Key Comics and Whitman Comics brands.

=== Animation ===
There are two animated series, both produced by Hanna-Barbera Productions in association with Paramount Television (now known as CBS Media Ventures). The Fonz and the Happy Days Gang ran from 1980 to 1982. There are also animated spin-offs of Laverne & Shirley (Laverne & Shirley in the Army) and Mork & Mindy (centering on a young Mork and Mindy in high school). The following season, they were connected together as Mork & Mindy/Laverne & Shirley/Fonz Hour (1982).

=== Musicals ===
In the late 1990s, a touring arena show called Happy Days: The Arena Spectacular toured Australia's major cities. The story featured a property developer, and former girlfriend of Fonzie's, called Miss Frost (Rebecca Gibney), wanting to buy the diner and redevelop it. It starred Craig McLachlan as Fonzie, Max Gillies and Wendy Hughes as Mr. and Mrs. Cunningham, Doug Parkinson as Al, and Jo Beth Taylor as Richie's love interest Laura. Tom Bosley presented an introduction before each performance live on stage, and pop group Human Nature played a 1950s-style rock group.

Another stage show, Happy Days: A New Musical, began touring in 2008.

==== Music videos ====
The music video for the song "Buddy Holly" (which takes place at Arnold's Drive-in) by Weezer features footage from the series, including clips of Richie, Potsie, Ralph Malph, Joanie, and Fonzie. Al Molinaro also reprises his role as Al Delvecchio in the video, introducing the band and learning from them afterward that the night's fish special was not very good.

=== Video games ===
A 1976 arcade racing game named Fonz was released based on Fonzie, with a picture of the character appearing on the side of the arcade cabinet.
