= Al Molinaro =

American actor (1919–2015)

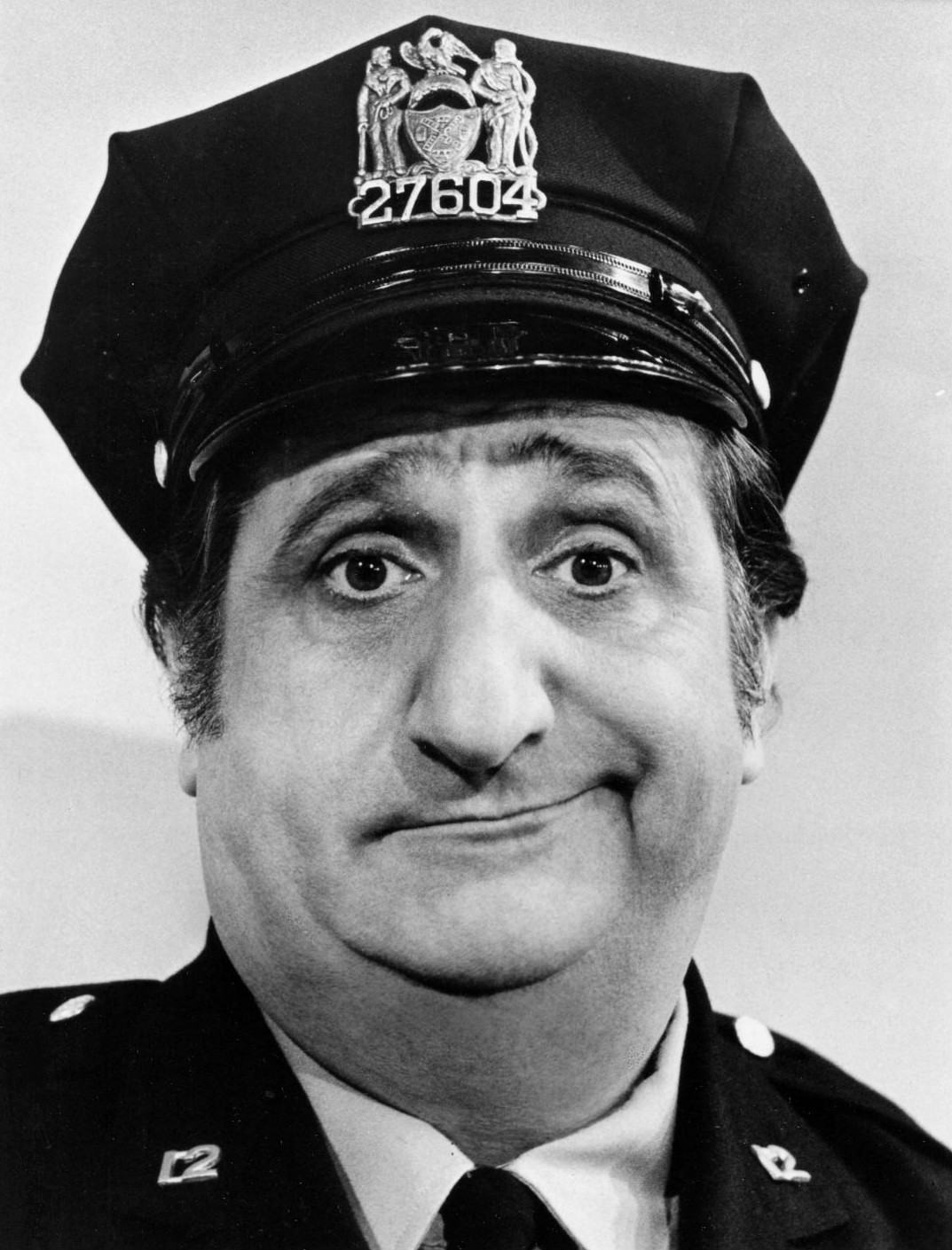
- Molinaro as police officer Murray Greshler in The Odd Couple in 1974.
- Born: Umberto Francesco Molinaro; June 24, 1919; Kenosha, Wisconsin, U.S.
- Died: October 30, 2015 (aged 96); Glendale, California, U.S.
- Other name: Albert Francis Molinaro
- Occupation: Actor
- Years active: 1940–2003
- Spouses: Jacquelin Martin (m. 1948; div. 1980) Betty Farrell (m. 1981)
- Children: 1

Albert Francis Molinaro (born Umberto Francesco Molinaro; June 24, 1919 – October 30, 2015) was an American actor. He played Al Delvecchio on Happy Days and Officer Murray Greshler on The Odd Couple. He also appeared in many television commercials, including On-Cor frozen dinners.

== Early life ==
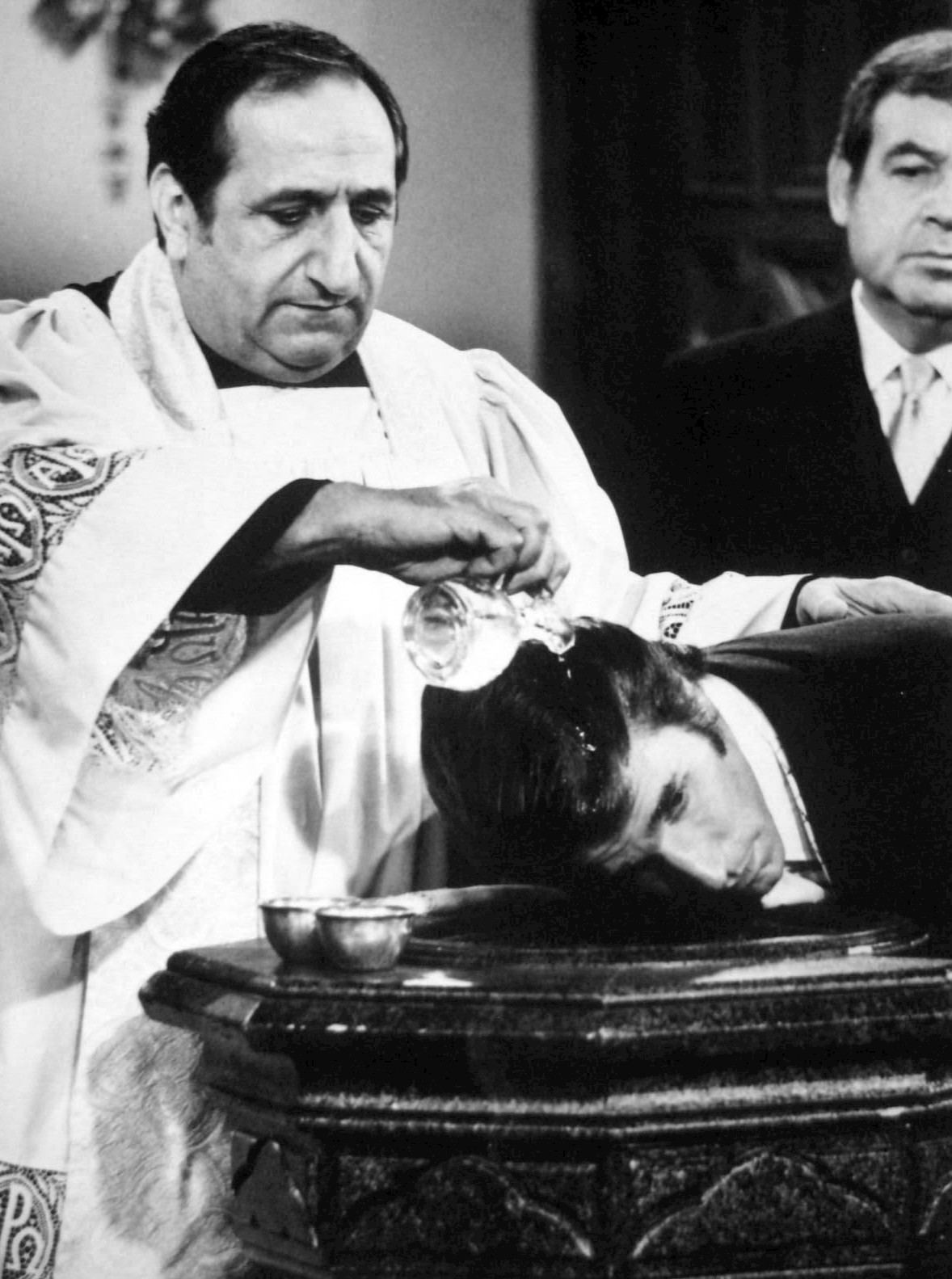
Molinaro as Father Anthony Delvecchio, the twin brother of Al Delvecchio on Happy Days, performing Fonzie's baptism in 1977

Umberto Francesco Molinaro was born and raised in the Columbus Park neighborhood of Kenosha, Wisconsin, the second-youngest of ten children of Raffaele and Teresa Molinaro, who had emigrated from Marano Principato in the province of Cosenza, Calabria, Italy.

Molinaro's father was a prominent tavern/restaurant/hotel owner, and a leader of the Kenosha Italian community who financially sponsored hundreds of Italians to immigrate to the United States. Molinaro's brother Joseph was Kenosha County's longest-serving district attorney and retired as a municipal judge, and his brother George served 30 years in the Wisconsin State Assembly, including one session as Speaker.

At school Al discovered a talent for public speaking, although he struggled at high school, staying on an extra year to graduate. In 1940, he left home, taking a bus to seek fame and fortune as an actor in Los Angeles. In 1948, Molinaro married Jacquelin Martin, with whom he had a son, Michael. The couple later divorced.

== From real estate to acting career ==
Molinaro moved to California working in odd jobs on the edge of the television industry, finally saving enough money to start his own collection agency. He eventually sold his business and became interested in southern California real estate speculation. His investments paid off when one of his properties were purchased by a conglomerate which used the land to build a shopping mall which provided a windfall to launch a career in acting. As a result, he was financially independent when he decided to pursue his longtime dream of being an actor.

In the 1960s and 1970s, Molinaro studied acting and was offered guest roles and bit parts on television sitcoms, including Bewitched, Get Smart, Green Acres and That Girl. He took an improvisation class, in which Penny Marshall was one of the other students. In 1970, Marshall introduced him to her brother, producer Garry Marshall, who offered Molinaro the role of police officer Murray Greshler on the television sitcom The Odd Couple.

During this time, he lived in a hotel in midtown New York City. "The first time I went to New York City", said his son Michael, "it was because he had moved there to do a number of commercials. He did not merely play a cop walking the beat on 'The Odd Couple'. He used to walk the streets of New York City and loved it." The show aired for five years until 1975.

In 1976, Garry Marshall hired Molinaro to replace Pat Morita on another sitcom he produced, Happy Days. Molinaro's character was the owner of Arnold's malt shop, Al Delvecchio, who was known for the sighing catchphrase "Yep-yep-yep...". Happy Days was set in Milwaukee, in Al's home state of Wisconsin. It ran for eleven seasons, from 1974 to 1984. For one episode, "My Favorite Orkan", it was Molinaro who suggested Robin Williams be cast when the original guest player, John Byner, declined the role and thus gave the young comedian his major opportunity to display his talent and become a major star.

In 1981, Molinaro remarried, to Betty Farrell. He left Happy Days in 1982, when tapped by Garry Marshall to play the Al Delvecchio role on the short-lived Happy Days spin-off Joanie Loves Chachi.

Molinaro starred in a failed TV pilot called The Ugily Family (1982) as the patriarch of an unattractive clan who is constantly correcting mispronunciations of his surname as "ugly".

=== Later career ===
In 1987, Molinaro and fellow Happy Days cast member Anson Williams opened a chain of diners called Big Al's. The business went defunct. He revealed in 1990 that he declined acting roles in movies offered to him by Garry Marshall. Molinaro said at the time,

"I can't work in movies with Garry because I'm so square that I won't be in a movie that has four-letter words in it. . . . That puts me pretty much totally out of films these days. . . . You get to a point where you don't want to do just anything for the career. You gotta live with yourself".

Starting in 1990, Molinaro played grandfather Joe Alberghetti on the CBS sitcom The Family Man. The show was produced by Miller-Boyett Productions, which also produced Happy Days.

Molinaro was proud of his role on Happy Days and defended its anachronistic look as authentic and a genuine show that did not sentimentalize the past. Its success was down to syndication of the series into a franchise that was marketed around the world in many countries. Molinaro was a frequent guest on the Don and Mike Show, a nationally syndicated radio show that aired from 1985 to 2008.

Molinaro reprised his role as Al Delvecchio from Happy Days in Weezer's 1994 music video of the song "Buddy Holly", which was set in Arnold's diner. He introduced the band by saying, "Okay kids, Arnold's is proud to present Kenosha, Wisconsin's own Weezer!"

His somewhat laid-back laconic sideways glance at the humour led him to remark,

In the industry, they used to consider us like a bubble-gum show. But I think they overlooked one thing. To the public in America Happy Days was an important show, and I think it still is.

In 1992, he appeared in the Happy Days Reunion Special on ABC.

He retired from acting in television and films in the early 1990s, but continued to appear in TV commercials until the early 2000s. He appeared in 42 commercials for On-Cor frozen foods between 1987 and 2003. He also starred in television advertisements for Cortaid hydrocortisone cream and Mr. Big paper products.

In reflecting on his acting career in 2004, Molinaro said, "I spent 20 years here before I got anything going [...] You've just got to be lucky and in the right place at the right time."

== Death ==
Molinaro died of complications from an infected gallbladder at a hospital in Glendale, California on October 30, 2015, at the age of 96. He was cremated.

== Filmography ==
Film
Year	Title	Role	Notes
1954	Love Me Madly	Himself	
1975	It's a Bird... It's a Plane... It's Superman!	Gangster	
1976	Freaky Friday	Drapery Man	
1980	Gridlock	Sightseer	

Television
Year	Title	Role	Notes
1969	Get Smart	Agent 44	"Ironhand" & "Ice Station Siegfried"
1970–1975	The Odd Couple	Officer Murray Greshler	73 episodes
1971	Bewitched	Tour Guide	"Bewitched, Bothered and Baldoni"
1971	That Girl	Marv	"Chef's Night Out"
1976–1984	Happy Days	Al Delvecchio	146 episodes
1977	The Love Boat	Antonio Borga	"Dear Beverly / The Strike / Special Delivery"
1979	$weepstake$		Season 1, episode 8
1979, 1982	Fantasy Island	Lou Fielding & Max Grant	"Bowling/Command Performance" & "Dancing Lady/The Final Round"
1980	The Ugily Family	Sal Ugily	A 30-minute failed TV pilot
1982–1983	Joanie Loves Chachi	Al Delvecchio	17 episodes
1985	Punky Brewster	Imprisoned Santa Claus	"Christmas Shoplifting"
1990–1991	The Family Man	Joe Alberghetti	22 episodes
1992	Step by Step	Joe Passarelli	"The Boss"
