= Potsie Weber =

Fictional character from Happy Days

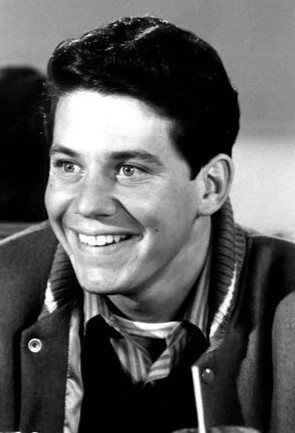
- Potsie as he appears in the first episode, "All the Way" (1974)
- First appearance: "Love and the Happy Days" (pilot on Love, American Style) "All the Way" (series)
- Last appearance: "Fonzie's Spots" (officially); KSTP-TV's ads (unofficially)
- Created by: Garry Marshall
- Portrayed by: Anson Williams

In-universe information
- Gender: Male
- Occupation: Works at Howard Cunningham's hardware store

Warren "Potsie" Weber is a fictional character from the sitcom Happy Days. He was played by Anson Williams. Anson also played the character in several other shows; he appeared in guest appearances on Love, American Style and Laverne & Shirley.

Potsie was a close friend of Richie Cunningham and Ralph Malph, who often spent time at Arnold's Drive In. He was characterized as being not very bright, somewhat gullible, socially clumsy, and in modern hindsight, very "square," and because of it, he was frequently called a nerd by friends and acquaintances. However, Potsie is a very talented singer, and his musical endeavors became more central to the character as the series progressed. Potsie's extremely sour relationship with his father (never seen on camera) was a minor running joke on the series, with lines such as "I'm gonna talk to my dad too; will be the first time in six months!" Despite his shortcomings, he is a very kind and compassionate young man. If he messes up, he is usually the first to apologize. He is the first to jump in and support someone, especially his best friend Richie.

In "The Deadly Dares" (Season 1, Episode 6), Potsie revealed how he got his nickname. He was asked, "Potsie Weber? What kind of name is this?" He replied, "They call me Potsie because when I was a young boy I used to like to make things with clay, and one day my mother called me Potsie."

In the pilot and early seasons, Potsie appeared with best friend Richie in the plots and appeared to be cooler than him, a character trait that would be dropped by the writers (in the early episodes, Potsie was described as "Richie's worldly best friend"). As the series progressed, and with the breakout character Arthur "Fonzie" Fonzarelli becoming close friends with Richie, Potsie became more commonly paired with Ralph in episodes, particularly when the pair rented an apartment together upon leaving high school.

Potsie was – along with Richie and Ralph, and later Chachi Arcola – part of a band that, in some episodes, performed at Arnold's Drive-In (and later, Fonzie & Big Al's) and other venues. Williams actually sang lead vocals, and occasionally played guitar, for the group and sang in several other episodes where he was apart from the band. Richie played guitar and saxophone, Ralph played the piano, and Chachi played the drums. In later episodes, Leather Tuscadero would join them on bass guitar and vocals along with her backup singers/dancers.

Like his friends, Potsie had his share of crushes on members of the opposite sex. His one steady girlfriend was Jennifer Jerome, played by Lorrie Mahaffey, who became Williams' wife from 1978 to 1986. The two met in college and shared a passion for singing, as evidenced by a duet they sang during their fraternity/sorority "pinning ceremony". Her departure from the show was left unexplained.

Potsie, who eventually became assistant manager of Cunningham Hardware, the hardware store owned and operated by Richie's father, Howard Cunningham, was apparently smart enough to get into medical school, and continued to work toward his goal of becoming a psychiatrist during the later years of the show's run.

Potsie was one of the few characters to remain through the entire run of the show, even though his appearances became sporadic in the later years (Potsie appeared in only six episodes apiece in the final two seasons). As episodes began to shift toward Fonzie and the other characters, Potsie became more of a "dumb foil" for punchlines, usually from Fonzie or Mr. Cunningham.

Although he is credited as a star during the opening credits of the series finale, "Passages", he does not appear in the episode, other than in archive footage from previous episodes in the end montage.
