= Erin Moran =

American actress (1960–2017)

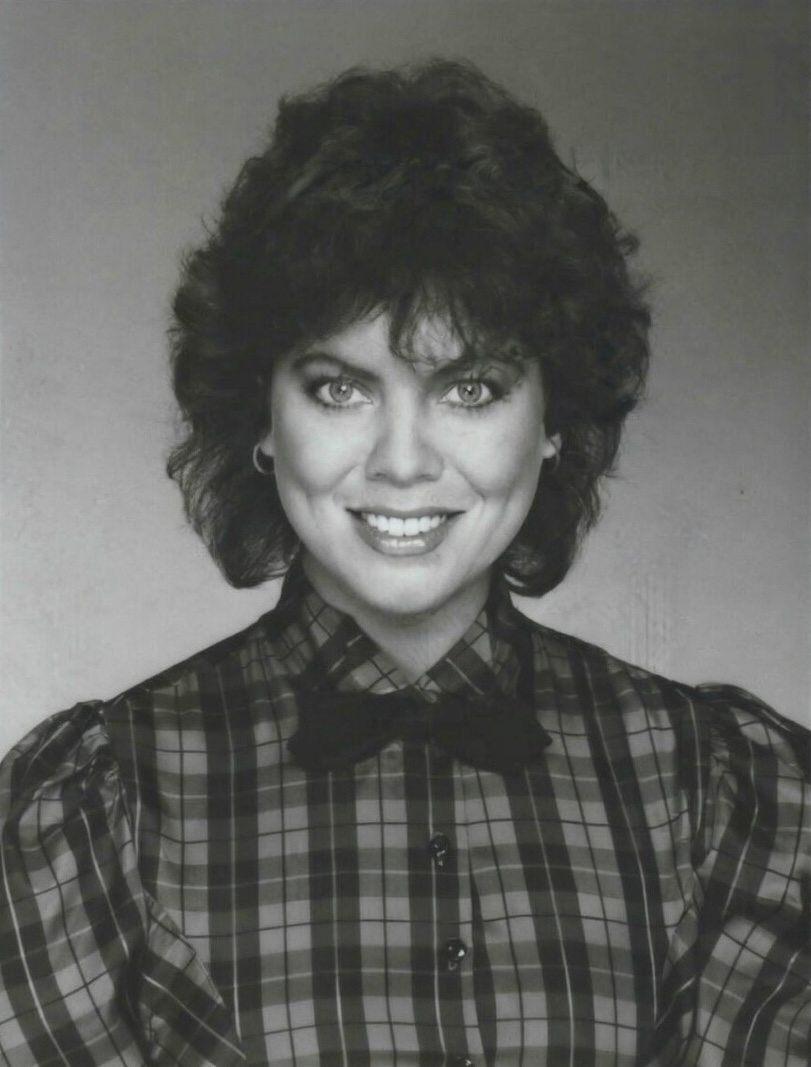
- Moran in 1983
- Born: October 18, 1960; Burbank, California, U.S.
- Died: April 22, 2017 (aged 56); New Salisbury, Indiana, U.S.
- Other name: Erin Marie Fleischmann
- Occupation: Actress
- Years active: 1966–2012
- Known for: Happy Days; Joanie Loves Chachi
- Spouses: Rocky Ferguson (m. 1987; div. 1993) Steven Fleischmann (m. 1993)
- Relatives: Tony Moran (brother)

Erin Marie Moran-Fleischmann (October 18, 1960 – April 22, 2017) was an American actress, best known for playing Joanie Cunningham on the television sitcom Happy Days and its spin-off Joanie Loves Chachi.

== Early life ==
Erin Marie Moran was born on October 18, 1960, in Burbank, California, near Los Angeles, and raised in nearby North Hollywood. She was the second-youngest of six children born to Sharon and Edward Moran. Her father was a finance manager, and her interest in acting was supported by her mother, who signed her with a talent agent when she was five years old. Two of her brothers are also actors, John Moran and Tony Moran, the latter of whom played the unmasked Michael Myers in the movie Halloween (1978).

She publicly accused her father of physical and mental abuse in 1992.

== Career ==
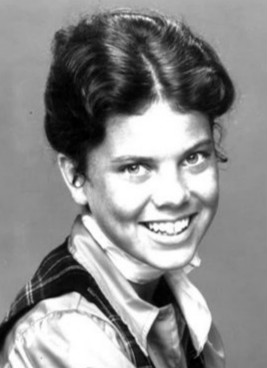
Moran as Joanie Cunningham in 1976

Moran's first acting role was at the age of five in a television commercial for First Federal Bank. At the age of seven, she was cast as Jenny Jones in the television series Daktari, during its fourth and final season in 1968. She made her feature-film debut in How Sweet It Is! (1968) with Debbie Reynolds, and made regular appearances on The Don Rickles Show in 1972, and guest appearances in The Courtship of Eddie's Father, My Three Sons, Bearcats!, Family Affair, and The Waltons, in an episode titled "The Song", in 1975. She also appeared in the television series Gunsmoke (as Rachel Parker in “Lijah”).

In 1974, at the age of 13, Moran was cast to play her best-known role as Joanie Cunningham on the sitcom Happy Days, the younger sister of Richie Cunningham (Ron Howard). Moran continued the role in 1982 in the short-lived spin-off series Joanie Loves Chachi. Moran later stated that she had only reluctantly agreed to star in the series because she would have preferred to remain with Happy Days. She won the Young Artist Award for Best Young Actress in a New Television Series for her role. After Joanie Loves Chachi's cancellation in 1983, she returned to Happy Days for its final season.

In 1983, Moran said in an interview that the Happy Days producers had pressured her to change from about the age of 15: They "suddenly wanted me to lose weight and become this sexy thing."

In the following years, Moran made several other television guest appearances, including The Love Boat, Murder, She Wrote, and Diagnosis: Murder, and starred opposite Edward Albert in the cult sci-fi horror film Galaxy of Terror (1981). She became estranged from the Happy Days cast, with People claiming that she called them "evil" in an interview, a statement she would deny on a later talk show.

In 2008, she was a contestant on VH1's reality show Celebrity Fit Club. Two years later, she made an appearance in the independent comedy feature Not Another B Movie (2010).

== Happy Days lawsuit ==
On April 19, 2011, Moran, three of her Happy Days co-stars—Don Most, Anson Williams, and Marion Ross—and the estate of Tom Bosley, who died in 2010, filed a $10 million breach-of-contract lawsuit against CBS, which owns the show. The suit claimed that cast members had not been paid merchandising revenues owed under their contracts. Revenues included those from show-related items such as comic books, T-shirts, scrapbooks, trading cards, games, lunch boxes, dolls, toy cars, magnets, greeting cards, and DVDs with cast members' likenesses on the box covers. Their contracts entitled the actors to be paid 5% of the net proceeds of merchandising if a single actor's likeness was used, and half that amount if the cast members were pictured in a group. CBS stated it owed the actors between $8,500 and $9,000 each, most of it from slot-machine revenues, but the group stated they were owed millions. The lawsuit was initiated after Ross was informed by a friend playing slots at a casino of a Happy Days machine on which players won the jackpot when five Marion Rosses were rolled.

In October 2011, a judge rejected the group's claim of fraud, thereby eliminating the possibility of recouping millions of dollars in damages. On June 5, 2012, a judge denied a motion to dismiss filed by CBS, which meant the case would go to trial on July 17 if not settled by then. In July 2012, the actors settled their lawsuit with CBS; each received a payment of $65,000 and a promise from CBS to continue honoring the terms of their contracts.

== Personal life and death ==
In 1987, Moran married Rocky Ferguson. They divorced in 1993. Later that year, she married Steven Fleischmann, a Walmart employee.

After Happy Days and Joanie Loves Chachi were cancelled, Moran moved from Los Angeles to the California mountains. She said in 1988 that she suffered from depression and was unable to secure acting roles. Moran confirmed news reports that her California home was foreclosed on in 2010, following media claims that she had been served eviction papers and moved into her mother-in-law's trailer home in Indiana.

On April 22, 2017, authorities in Corydon, Indiana, were alerted about an unresponsive female, later identified as Moran. She later was pronounced dead at the age of 56. An autopsy report from the Harrison County coroner indicated the cause of death to be complications of stage-four throat cancer (squamous-cell carcinoma). Toxicology testing showed that no illegal narcotics were involved in her death, and no illegal substances were found in Moran's home. Moran's husband, in an open letter released through her co-star Scott Baio, confirmed that she had first experienced symptoms of throat cancer around Thanksgiving 2016 and deteriorated rapidly from that point, and that the facilities that had unsuccessfully attempted to treat her cancer had not made anyone aware of how extensively the cancer had metastasized.

== Filmography ==
=== Film ===
Year	Title	Role	Notes
1967	Who's Minding the Mint?	Little Girl on Tricycle	Uncredited
1968	How Sweet It Is!	Laurie	
1969	80 Steps to Jonah	Kim	
1969	The Happy Ending	Marge Wilson as a Child	Uncredited
1970	Watermelon Man	Janice Gerber	
1981	Galaxy of Terror	Alluma	
1996	Dear God	Erin Moran	
1998	Desperation Boulevard	Erin Moran	
2003	Dickie Roberts: Former Child Star	Erin Moran	
2008	Broken Promise	Mrs. Watkins	
2010	Not Another B Movie	Mrs. Klien	
2012	The Deceit	Mrs. Shephard	Final film role

=== Television ===
Year	Title	Role	Notes
1968	Stanley vs. the System		TV movie
1968–1969	Daktari	Jenny Jones	Main cast, season 4 (15 episodes)
1969	Death Valley Days	Mary Tugwell / Mary Elizabeth	2 episodes
1970–1973	The F.B.I.	Vickie Florea / Cindy Marot / Morrie Prager's daughter	3 episodes
1970–1971	Family Affair	Amy / Mary Ellen / Janet	3 episodes
1970	The Courtship of Eddie's Father	Emily Ruth Gustafson	Episode: "How Do You Know If It's Really Love?"
1970	My Three Sons	Victoria Lewis	Episode: "Dodie's Dilemma"
1971	The Smith Family	Julie Keefer / Little Girl	2 episodes
1971	Gunsmoke	Rachel Parker / Jenny	2 episodes
1971	O'Hara, U.S. Treasury	Little Girl	Episode: "Operation: Bribery"
1971	Bearcats!	Elisa Tillman	Episode: "Hostages"
1971	The Strange Monster of Strawberry Cove	Student on Camping Trip	TV movie
1972	The Don Rickles Show	Janie Robinson	Main cast (13 episodes)
1973	Lisa, Bright and Dark	Tracy Schilling	TV movie
1974–1984	Happy Days	Joanie Cunningham	Main cast (234 episodes)
1975	The Waltons	Sally Ann Harper	Episode: "The Song"
1979	Greatest Heroes of the Bible	Tova	Episode: "Tower of Babel"
1979	$weepstake$		Episode: "Lynn and Grover and Joey"
1980–1985	The Love Boat	Carrie Walker / Joanne Morgan / Barbara Blatnick / Janet Reynolds	6 episodes
1981	Twirl	Bonnie Lee Jordan	TV movie
1982–1983	Joanie Loves Chachi	Joanie Cunningham	Lead role (17 episodes)
1983	Hotel	Karen Donnelly	Episode: "Hotel"
1984	Glitter	Caroline Mason	Episode: "In Tennis, Love Means Nothing"
1986	Murder, She Wrote	Maggie Roberts	Episode: "Unfinished Business"
1998	Diagnosis: Murder	Cynthia Bennett	Episode: "Food Fight"
1999	Good vs. Evil	Herself	Episode: "Gee Your Hair Smells Evil"
2001	Weakest Link	Herself	"Classic TV Stars Special Edition #2"
2005	Happy Days: 30th Anniversary Reunion	Herself	TV special
2007	Scott Baio Is 45...and Single	Herself	Episode: "Scott Baio Hires a Life Coach" (Part 1)"
2009	The Bold and the Beautiful	Kelly DeMartin	Episode: "Episode #1.5691"
2012	Celebrity Ghost Stories	Herself	"Season 4 Episode 12"

== Soundtrack ==
=== Film ===
Year	Title	Song(s) performed
2003	Dickie Roberts: Former Child Star	"Child Stars on Your Television" (with other child actors)

=== Television ===
Year	Title	Song(s) performed	Episode
1975	The Waltons	"Will You Be Mine" (with Jon Walmsley)	"The Song" (Season 3, Episode 23)
1977–1983	Happy Days	"Faith of Our Fathers" (with Ron Howard, Anson Williams and Donny Most)	"Fonzie's Baptism" (Season 4, Episode 25)
1977–1983	Happy Days	"Down by the Old Mill Stream" (with Tom Bosley, Marion Ross, Ron Howard and Henry Winkler)	"Requiem for a Malph" (Season 5, Episode 12)
1977–1983	Happy Days	"Beer Barrel Polka" (with Tom Bosley, Marion Ross and Henry Winkler) "That Old Gang of Mine" (with Tom Bosley, Marion Ross and Ron Howard)	"Fonzie vs. The She-Devils" (Season 7, Episode 11)
1977–1983	Happy Days	"You Look at Me" (with Scott Baio)	"Broadway It's Not" (Season 8, Episode 12)
1977–1983	Happy Days	"Long After You'll Always Have Me" (with Scott Baio)	"American Musical" (Season 8, Episode 22)
1977–1983	Happy Days	"Lookin' Good, Feelin' Fine" (with Scott Baio)	"No, Thank You" (Season 9, Episode 9)
1977–1983	Happy Days	"Call" (with Scott Baio)	"To Beanie or Not to Beanie" (Season 9, Episode 12)
1977–1983	Happy Days	"How Am I Gonna Sing" (with Tom Bosley, Marion Ross, Lynda Goodfriend, Ted McGinley and Pat O'Brien)	"Grandma Nussbaum" (Season 9, Episode 14)
1977–1983	Happy Days	"Twistin' the Night Away" (with Scott Baio)	"Poobah Doo Dah" (Season 9, Episode 15)
1977–1983	Happy Days	"Twist and Shout" (with Scott Baio)	"A Touch of Classical" (Season 9, Episode 16)
1977–1983	Happy Days	"Time Turned Around" (with Scott Baio)	"Great Expectations" (Season 9, Episode 18)
1977–1983	Happy Days	"Come Go with Me" (with Scott Baio)	"Who Gives a Hootenanny?" (Season 10, Episode 6)
1977–1983	Happy Days	"The Loco-Motion" (with Scott Baio)	"Life is More Important Than Show Business" (Season 10, Episode 15)
1982–1983	Joanie Loves Chachi	"Too Young to Know" (with Scott Baio)	"Chicago" (Season 1, Episode 1)
1982–1983	Joanie Loves Chachi	"Puttin' It All Together" (with Scott Baio)	"The Performance" (Season 1, Episode 2)
1982–1983	Joanie Loves Chachi	"Too Young to Know" (with Scott Baio) "I'll Take You Back" (with Scott Baio)	"I Do, I Don't, I Do" (Season 1, Episode 3)
1982–1983	Joanie Loves Chachi	"Lookin' Good, Feelin' Fine" (with Scott Baio) "The Lasting Kind"	"College Days" (Season 1, Episode 4)
1982–1983	Joanie Loves Chachi	"Makin' Room for a Friend" (with Scott Baio) "You and Me and Summer" (with Scott Baio)	"Fonzie's Visit" (Season 2, Episode 1)
1982–1983	Joanie Loves Chachi	"Our Love Was Meant to Be" (with Scott Baio)	"One-on-One" (Season 2, Episode 3)
1982–1983	Joanie Loves Chachi	"That's My Kind of Lovin" (with Scott Baio)	"No Nudes Is Good Nudes" (Season 2, Episode 4)
1982–1983	Joanie Loves Chachi	"That's Why I Love You" (with Scott Baio)	"Everybody Loves Aunt Vanessa" (Season 2, Episode 5)
1982–1983	Joanie Loves Chachi	"I'll Take You Back" (with Scott Baio)	"Goodbye Delvecchio's, Hello World" (Season 2, Episode 8)
1982–1983	Joanie Loves Chachi	"He's So Fine"	"Term Paper" (Season 2, Episode 9)
1982–1983	Joanie Loves Chachi	"Love Me Tender" (with Scott Baio)	"The Elopement" (Season 2, Episode 13)
1983	Hotel	"Delta Dawn" (with Mel Tormé)	"Hotel" (pilot episode)

== Awards and nominations ==
Year	Association	Nominated work	Category	Result
1977	Photoplay Awards	—N/a	Gold Medal – Favorite Child Star	Nominated
1983	Young Artist Award	Joanie Loves Chachi	Best Young Actress in a New Television Series	Won
2006	TV Land Award	Happy Days	Most Wonderful Wedding (shared with Scott Baio)	Won
