= Al Delvecchio =

Happy Days and Joanie Loves Chachi character

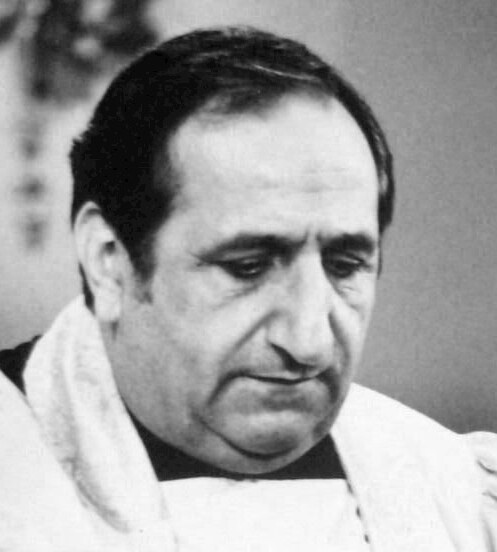
- First appearance: "Fonzie Loves Pinky Parts 1,2 & 3" (1976)
- Last appearance: "Passages Part 2" (1984)
- Portrayed by: Al Molinaro

In-universe information
- Gender: Male
- Occupation: Owner of Arnold's (Happy Days seasons 4–9), Owner of Delvecchio's (Joanie Loves Chachi)
- Family: Father Delvecchio (twin brother); Unnamed (brother)
- Spouse: Louisa Delvecchio
- Children: Chachi Arcola (step-son)
- Relatives: Josephine (cousin); Dominic (uncle); Joanie Cunningham Arcola (stepdaughter-in-law)

Alfred "Big Al" Delvecchio is a character on the U.S. sitcom Happy Days. He was played by Al Molinaro. Molinaro joined the cast in Season 4 after Pat Morita, who played Arnold, left after the end of the third season (in the last episode "Arnold Gets Married"). Subsequently, Molinaro also played Al's twin brother priest Father Anthony Delvecchio. Al said that he also had a brother who worked at the sanitation department.

== Fictional character biography ==
Al Delvecchio was the owner and cook of Arnold's Drive-In from season 4 to season 9. He bought the restaurant from its original owner, Matsuo "Arnold" Takahashi, after Arnold got married and moved away in season 4. Al eventually married Chachi's mother, Louisa. He had a sighing catchphrase of "Yep-yep-yep...". Al and Louisa moved to Chicago with Joanie and Chachi and opened a restaurant in Chicago where Joanie and Chachi perform. When Joanie and Chachi move back to Milwaukee, Al and Louisa remain in Chicago.

For much of the series, Al would talk about his former love, Rosa Coletti, and how she left him for a tie salesman. Al would meet Rosa again in the eighth-season episode, "If You Knew Rosa". She was played by Nancy Marvy.

== Other media ==
Al Molinaro as Al Delvecchio made a cameo appearance in the 1994 Weezer music video for their single "Buddy Holly", where the band were portrayed as playing at Arnold's. Molinaro was the only cast member from the show to record new content for the music video, while the rest were edited in through archival footage. The character also made an appearance on the Robot Chicken episode "Celebutard Mountain", but was voiced by Adam Talbot. He also appeared on Family Guy on a stained glass window in the church of "The Holy Fonz" on the episode "The Father, the Son, and the Holy Fonz".
