= Scott Baio =

American actor (born 1960)

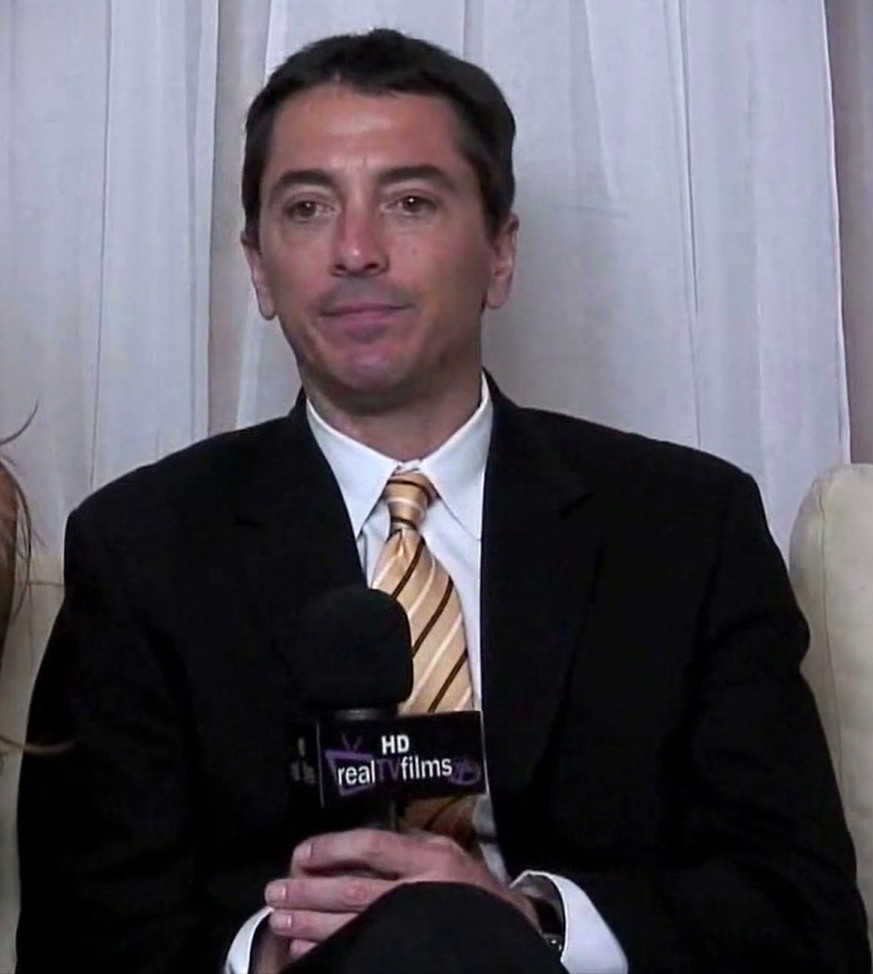
- Baio in 2009
- Born: Scott Vincent Baio; September 22, 1960 (age 66) (Note: Baio was born in 1960, though earlier sources state 1961.); New York City, U.S.
- Occupations: Actor; television director
- Years active: 1976–present
- Known for: Bugsy Malone; Happy Days; Joanie Loves Chachi; Diagnosis: Murder; Charles in Charge; See Dad Run; Arrested Development
- Spouse: Renée Sloan-Baio (m. 2007)
- Children: 2 (Note: One with Renée Sloan, the other is Renée Sloan's older daughter whom Baio adopted.)

Scott Vincent Baio (/ˈbeɪ.oʊ/; born September 22, 1960) is an American actor. He is known for playing Chachi Arcola on the sitcom Happy Days (1977–1984) and its spin-off Joanie Loves Chachi (1982–1983), the title character on the sitcom Charles in Charge (1984–1990), Dr. Jack Stewart in the medical-mystery-drama series Diagnosis: Murder (1993–1995), and the title role of the musical Bugsy Malone (1976, his onscreen debut). Baio has guest-starred on various television programs, appeared in several independent films, and starred on the Nickelodeon sitcom See Dad Run (2012–2014).

== Early life ==
Baio was born in the Bay Ridge neighborhood of the Brooklyn borough of New York City in 1960, the son of Italian immigrants Rose, a homemaker, and Mario Baio, who worked as his manager. He and his siblings were raised in Bensonhurst. He went to Xaverian High School.

== Career ==
In 1976, Baio played the title character Bugsy Malone in the children's gangster musical directed by Alan Parker, which also co-starred Jodie Foster. Baio and Foster later worked together again in the teen girl drama Foxes (1980), helmed by Adrian Lyne.

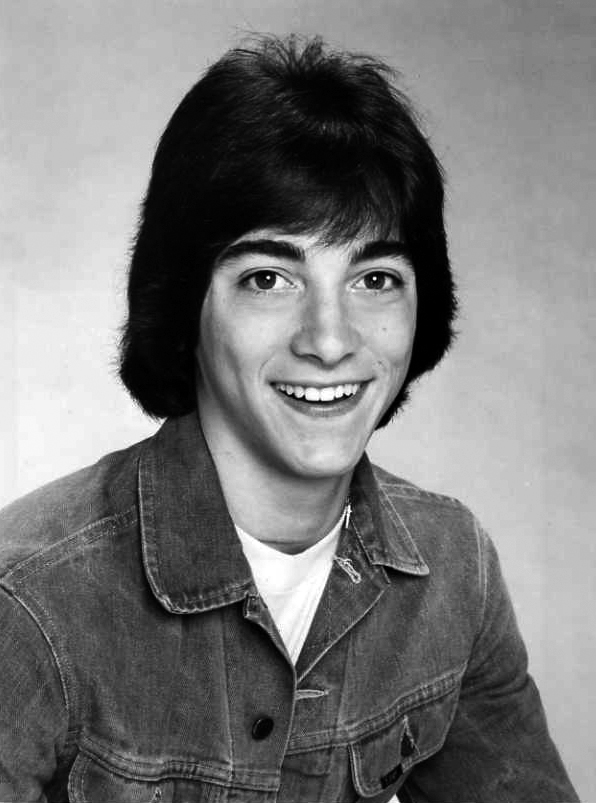
Baio in 1982

When he was 16, Baio was cast as The Fonz's cousin Chachi Arcola on Happy Days. During his time on Happy Days, Baio earned two Daytime Emmy Award nominations, for his lead performances in the television movies Stoned (1981) and All the Kids Do It (1985). He won two Young Artist Awards during the Third Annual Youth in Film Awards (1980–1982) as Best Young Actor in a Television Special for Stoned and Best Young Comedian in Television or Motion Pictures for Happy Days. He also starred in the made-for-television youth drama specials The Boy Who Drank Too Much and Senior Trip.

From March 1982 to May 1983, Baio starred with his Happy Days co-star Erin Moran in the show's spin-off, Joanie Loves Chachi. The show was canceled after 17 episodes and Baio (and Moran) returned to Happy Days. During this period, Baio, who played an aspiring singer on Joanie Loves Chachi, was signed to a record contract with RCA Victor, who used his TV role to push his music career. He released two albums and three singles, and his self-titled album peaked at number 181 on the Billboard 200, but his recording career never took off.

In 1982, Baio appeared in the film Zapped! and starred as Francis Geminiani in the special HBO presentation of Gemini, an adaptation of the Broadway comedy-drama Happy Birthday, Gemini. From 1979 to 1984, he made seven appearances on Battle of the Network Stars, six as a competitor for the ABC team (once as team captain) and one as co-host. From 1984 until 1990, Baio starred in the syndicated comedy series Charles in Charge. In 1985, he was part of an ensemble cast for Alice in Wonderland, where he portrayed Pat the Pig. From 1987 through 1991, he was a director of the children's comedy series Out of This World.

During the 1990s, Baio appeared in various television programs, including the short-lived Look Who's Talking small screen spin-off Baby Talk. In 1991, he appeared in the NBC Monday Night Movie Perry Mason and the Case of the Fatal Fashion, as a young prosecutor. Between 1993 and 1995, he portrayed Dr. Jack Stewart in the medical mystery series Diagnosis: Murder. Baio was a guest-star on a variety of series, including Full House, Touched by an Angel, Veronica's Closet and The Nanny. He also starred in several films on television and video releases such as Detonator, Bar-Hopping, Dumb Luck, Face Value and Mixed Blessings.

Baio was in the independent films Very Mean Men (2000), Face to Face (2001), and The Bread, My Sweet (2001). In 2004, he starred in Superbabies: Baby Geniuses 2 with Bob Clark. The film was widely panned by critics and nominated for four Razzie Awards. Baio played himself in the 2005 Wes Craven film Cursed. In 2005, Baio appeared in four episodes of Arrested Development as the Bluth family's new lawyer, Bob Loblaw (the Bluth family's previous lawyer, Barry Zuckerkorn, having been played by his former Happy Days co-star Henry Winkler); the Online Film and Television Association nominated him as Best Guest Actor in a Comedy Series for the role. In 2007 Baio starred in the VH1 celebrity reality series Scott Baio Is 45...and Single and its successor the following year, Scott Baio Is 46...and Pregnant. Baio was also the co-host of the VH1 reality show Confessions of a Teen Idol, in which former teen idols attempt to resurrect their careers.

Baio starred in and produced the Nick at Nite situation comedy See Dad Run, which ran from 2012 to 2015. On the same network (Nickelodeon), Baio guest starred in a 2014 episode of Sam & Cat as a police officer named Officer Kelvin who arrests the title characters for taking over $400 out of a Handy Quick convenience store's ATM. He was the sixth guest star in the series.

== Personal life ==
In 2001, Baio got engaged to his girlfriend Jeanette Jonsson.

In 2007, shortly before the birth of their daughter, Baio married Renée Sloan, whom he had met in the 1990s at the Playboy Mansion. Renée was carrying twins, but lost one of the babies in the 11th week of her pregnancy. Their daughter, Bailey, was born in 2007, five weeks premature. After Bailey tested positive for a rare metabolic disorder, the family started the Bailey Baio Angel Foundation to provide financial support to other families who are dealing with metabolic disorders. Renée Baio was diagnosed with a meningioma brain tumor in June 2015, with a second tumor discovered later. In 2017 she was also diagnosed with cerebral microvascular disease. Baio is also the stepfather to Renée's daughter Kalyn, born in 1989.

He is a cousin of former actor Jimmy Baio, San Francisco Giants outfielder Harrison Bader, and Vampire Weekend bassist Chris Baio.

=== Political views ===
Baio is a registered Republican and has described his politics as conservative. He campaigned for Ronald Reagan in his youth and attended Reagan's state funeral. Upon Reagan's death in 2004, he was quoted by the New York Daily News as saying, "President Reagan made me feel proud to be an American. Today, I feel sadness."

Baio endorsed Republican presidential candidates Mitt Romney in 2012 and Donald Trump in 2016, and he spoke at the opening night of the 2016 Republican National Convention. He also supported Donald Trump in the 2020 presidential election.

On December 15, 2016, Baio accused Nancy Mack, wife of Chad Smith, drummer for Red Hot Chili Peppers, of physically assaulting him at their children's elementary school function. Baio claims Mack began berating and cursing him over his support of Trump and at one point attacked him, grabbing him under his arms and then shaking and pushing him. Mack claimed she was trying to show Baio how Trump hugs women and denied any intentional physical aggression.

On August 26, 2017, Baio re-tweeted a Sandy Hook conspiracy theory meme, insinuating that the 2017 killing of Heather Heyer in Charlottesville and the Sandy Hook shooting of 2012 were linked hoaxes.

=== Allegations of abuse ===
On January 29, 2018, sexual misconduct allegations made by Nicole Eggert against Baio surfaced. In 2013 Eggert stated on the Nik Richie Radio show that she and Baio had a one-time encounter "years" after Charles in Charge ended, which would have been after 1990. In the more elaborated account, discussed on The Dr. Oz Show and Megyn Kelly Today, Eggert claimed that Baio molested her beginning in 1986 when she was 14, and that when she was 17, she had intercourse with him. Baio contends that he had sexual relations with Eggert only once, and that the encounter occurred after she had turned 18. Baio explained that Eggert's own words to Richie proved he did not have intercourse with Eggert while she was a minor, since the final episode of Charles in Charge aired in November 1990, ten months after Eggert turned 18.

Several months later, Alexander Polinsky, another co-star in Charles in Charge, accused Baio of verbally abusing and physically assaulting him while on set.

== Filmography ==
=== Film ===
| Year | Title | Role | Notes |
|---|---|---|---|
| 1976 | Bugsy Malone | Bugsy Malone | |
| 1979 | Skatetown, U.S.A. | Richie | |
| 1980 | Foxes | Brad | |
| 1982 | Zapped! | Barney Springboro | |
| 1987 | I Love N.Y. | Mario Cotone | |
| 1996 | Detonator | Zack Ramses | |
| 2000 | Very Mean Men | Paulie Minetti | Also associate producer |
| 2001 | A Wedding for Bella | Dominic | Formerly titled The Bread, My Sweet |
| 2001 | Italian Ties | Richie | Also writer; formerly titled Face to Face |
| 2001 | Face Value | Barry Rengler | |
| 2001 | Dumb Luck | Steve Hitchcock | |
| 2004 | Superbabies: Baby Geniuses 2 | Stan Bobbins | |
| 2005 | Cursed | Himself | |
| 2009 | Wrong Hole | Scott Baio | Short film |
| 2021 | Courting Mom and Dad | Brent Lambert | |
| 2024 | God's Not Dead: In God We Trust | John Wesley | |
| 2025 | A Line Of Fire | Bron | |

=== Television ===
| Year | Title | Role | Notes |
|---|---|---|---|
| 1976 | NBC Special Treat | Julius | Episode: "Luke Was There" |
| 1977 | Blansky's Beauties | Anthony DeLuca | Main role, 13 episodes |
| 1977–1984 | Happy Days | Chachi Arcola | Main role, 131 episodes |
| 1977 | The Love Boat | Graham D. Pickrel II | Episode: "Ex Plus Y/Golden Agers/Graham and Kelly" |
| 1978 | The Runaways | Tommy | Episode: "No Prince for My Cinderella" |
| 1978–1979 | Who's Watching the Kids? | Frankie 'the Fox' Vitola | Main role, 11 episodes |
| 1979 | Fantasy Island | Rob 'Robbie' Collins | Episode: "Amusement Park/Rock Stars" |
| 1980 | The Boy Who Drank Too Much | Buff Saunders | Television film |
| 1980 | Goodtime Girls | Tommy | Episode: "Growing Pains" |
| 1980 | Here's Boomer | Ronald | Episode: "Overboard" |
| 1980–1981 | ABC Afterschool Special | Jack Melon / Johnny Jay | 2 episodes |
| 1981 | Senior Trip | Roger Ellis | Television film |
| 1982 | Gemini | Francis Geminiani | Television film |
| 1982–1983 | Joanie Loves Chachi | Chachi Arcola | Main role, 17 episodes |
| 1983 | Hotel | Nick Tomasino | Episode: "Faith, Hope & Charity" |
| 1984 | CBS Schoolbreak Special | Buddy Elder | Episode: "All the Kids Do It" |
| 1984–1990 | Charles in Charge | Charles | Main role, 126 episodes |
| 1985 | The Fall Guy | Merrick Thorson | Episode: "Femme Fatale" |
| 1985 | Alice in Wonderland | Pat the Pig | Television film |
| 1986 | The Truth About Alex | Brad Stevens | Television film |
| 1987 | Kids in Motion | Himself | Host |
| 1988 | My Two Dads | Scott Cameo | Episode: "She'll Get Over It" |
| 1988–1989 | Out of This World | Scott Gold / Prince Cornelius | 3 episodes |
| 1989 | Full House | Pete Bianco | Episode: "Dr. Dare Rides Again" |
| 1991 | Perry Mason: The Case of the Fatal Fashion | Asst. D.A. Peter Whelan | Television film |
| 1991–1992 | ABC TGIF | James Halbrook | 4 episodes |
| 1991–1992 | Baby Talk | James Halbrook | Main role, 23 episodes |
| 1993 | Jack's Place | Woody B. King | Episode: "The Hands of Time" |
| 1993–1995 | Diagnosis: Murder | Dr. Jack Stewart | Main role, 41 episodes |
| 1995 | Mixed Blessings | Charlie Winwood | Television film |
| 1996 | Can't Hurry Love | Matt | 2 episodes |
| 1997 | Rewind | Rob DiPaulo | Unaired series, 2 episodes |
| 1998 | The Nanny | Dr. Frankie Cresitelli | Episode: "Rash to Judgment" |
| 2000 | Veronica's Closet | Kevin | 2 episodes |
| 2000 | Bar Hopping | Damian | Television film |
| 2001 | Touched by an Angel | Det. Frank McCovey | Episode: "A Death in the Family" |
| 2005, 2013 | Arrested Development | Bob Loblaw | 5 episodes |
| 2006 | Van Stone: Tour of Duty | Lt. Perry | Television film |
| 2008 | Scott Baio Is 45...and Single | Himself | Reality television, 8 episodes |
| 2008 | Finish Line | Frank Chase | Television film |
| 2009 | Confessions of a Teen Idol | Himself (host) | 8 episodes |
| 2012–2015 | See Dad Run | David Hobbs | Main role, 55 episodes; also executive producer, 45 episodes |
| 2013 | Big Time Rush | Scott Baio | Episode: "Big Time Cameo" |
| 2014 | Sam & Cat | Officer Kelvin | Episode: "#MagicATM" |
| 2014 | A Fairly Odd Summer | Foop (Human Form) | Television film |

=== Director ===
| Year | Series | Episode(s) | Notes |
|---|---|---|---|
| 1987–90 | Charles in Charge | 36 episodes | Also writer, episode: "Almost Family" |
| 1989–91 | Out of This World | 11 episodes | |
| 1989–90, 1992 | The New Lassie | 3 episodes | |
| 1991 | The Family Man | Episode: "A Tiny Advantage" | |
| 1991 | Harry and the Hendersons | Episode: "Halloween" | |
| 1992 | Baby Talk | Episode: "Warren Piece" | |
| 1993 | Shaky Ground | 3 episodes | |
| 1995 | First Time Out | Episode: "Psyched Out" | Credited as Scott Vincent Baio |
| 1996 | Kirk | 2 episodes | |
| 1996 | The Wayans Bros. | 4 episodes | |
| 1996–97 | The Jamie Foxx Show | 5 episodes | |
| 1997 | Nick Freno: Licensed Teacher | 3 episodes | |
| 1998 | Guys Like Us | Episode: "Friends and Lovers" | Credited as Scott Vincent Baio |
| 1998 | Malcolm & Eddie | Episode: "Silenced Partner" | Credited as Scott Vincent Baio |
| 1998 | Unhappily Ever After | Episode: "I Know What You Did in the Closet" | |
| 1998 | The Parkers | Episode: "Three's a Shag" | Credited as Scott Vincent Baio |

== Awards and nominations ==
| Year | Association | Category | Nominated work | Result |
|---|---|---|---|---|
| 1981 | Daytime Emmy Awards | Daytime Emmy Award for Outstanding Performer in Children's Programming | Jack Melon in "Stoned" ABC Afterschool Special | Nominated |
| 1981 | Young Artist Award | Best Young Comedian | Happy Days | Nominated |
| 1982 | Young Artist Award | Best Young Actor in a Television Series | Happy Days | Nominated |
| 1982 | Young Artist Award | Best Young Comedian – Motion Picture or Television | Happy Days | Won |
| 1982 | Young Artist Award | Best Young Actor in a Television special | Jack Melon in "Stoned" ABC Afterschool Special | Won |
| 1983 | Young Artist Award | Best Young Actor in a New Television Series | Joanie Loves Chachi | Nominated |
| 1985 | Daytime Emmy Awards | Daytime Emmy Award for Outstanding Performer in Children's Programming | All the Kids Do It CBS Schoolbreak Special | Nominated |
| 2002 | San Diego International Film Festival Festival Award | Best Actor | The Bread, My Sweet | Won |
| 2004 | TV Land Award | Favorite Teen Dream – Male | Joanie Loves Chachi | Won |
| 2005 | Online Film & Television Association | Best Guest Actor in a Comedy Series | Bob Loblaw in Arrested Development | Nominated |
| 2006 | TV Land Award | Most Wonderful Wedding | Chachi Arcola in Happy Days shared with Erin Moran | Won |
