= Ralph Malph =

Fictional character from Happy Days

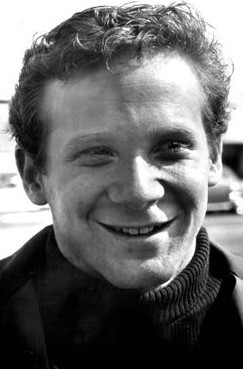
- First appearance: "All the Way"
- Last appearance: "Welcome Home Part 2"
- Created by: Garry Marshall
- Portrayed by: Donny Most

In-universe information
- Gender: Male
- Occupation: Student
- Family: Mickey Malph (father); Minnie Malph (mother); Mortimer Malph (uncle)

Ralph Hector Malph is a character on Happy Days played by Donny Most.

== Background of character ==
He usually had two things on his mind, girls and jokes. His jokes usually got little or no reaction from any other character, yet he continued his catchphrase, "I still got it!" Ralph was a practical joker and often used novelty items such as whoopie cushions, Groucho glasses, spring-loaded eyeball glasses, and joy buzzers.

In the first season, Malph's girl-chasing was the primary focus of his character. He occasionally got dates but generally he was not very successful at it, although he was more successful than Richie Cunningham and Potsie Weber. As the seasons progressed, he was shown to be easily frightened and often panicked greatly at the least and greatest occurrences. Originally the series tended to focus on Richie and Potsie, often in schemes to attract women, with Ralph as a third wheel. In the early seasons, Ralph was considerably "cooler" than Richie and Potsie, being a member of the gang, The Gems, and having a hot rod car.

Ralph was – along with Richie and Potsie, and later Chachi – part of a band that, in some episodes, performed at Arnold's Drive-In (and later, Fonzie & Big Al's) and other venues. Although Anson Williams (as Potsie) did most of the lead vocals for the group, Most (as Ralph) did perform solo vocals on a couple of occasions, most notably in the episodes "They Shoot Fonzies, Don't They" and "Be My Valentine."

As the series shifted its focus to concentrate more on breakout character Fonzie and his friendship with Richie, Ralph was more often paired with Potsie. This was evident even more when the characters graduated from high school, when Ralph and Potsie rented and shared an apartment together, and they often argued. In the first episode of this arrangement, "The Apartment", Richie also moved in with them but, due to the pair's continual squabbling, Richie decided to move back home.

In one episode where they were feuding, "Ralph vs. Potsie", they divided the apartment with white tape and assigned each other one side of the room, but they eventually patched up their differences.

Ralph returns home after being honorably discharged from the U.S. Army in the episode entitled "Welcome Home" and he decides to become an optometrist just like his father. Ralph goes off to college and this serves as his last appearance in Happy Days.

One small continuity error remains with the character of Ralph's father. Originally, his father owned a woman's dress store in town and his name was Harry Malph (played by Mike Monahan in the first-season episode "Because She's There"), but when the show shifted to a studio audience format in the third season, Ralph's father was shown to be an optometrist, Mickey Malph, played first by Alan Oppenheimer and then subsequently and more famously by Jack Dodson. Additionally, in the same first-season episode, Ralph's mother was named Hazel and was played by Gracia Lee; from the third season onward, however, she was referred to as Minnie Malph, and her character was never shown on camera again.

In Phish's song "Clear Your Mind," the "Ralph" verse references Ralph Malph, likely in a nod to the practical jokes they are instigating means "they still got it."
