= Chachi Arcola =

Fictional character from 1970s sitcom Happy Days

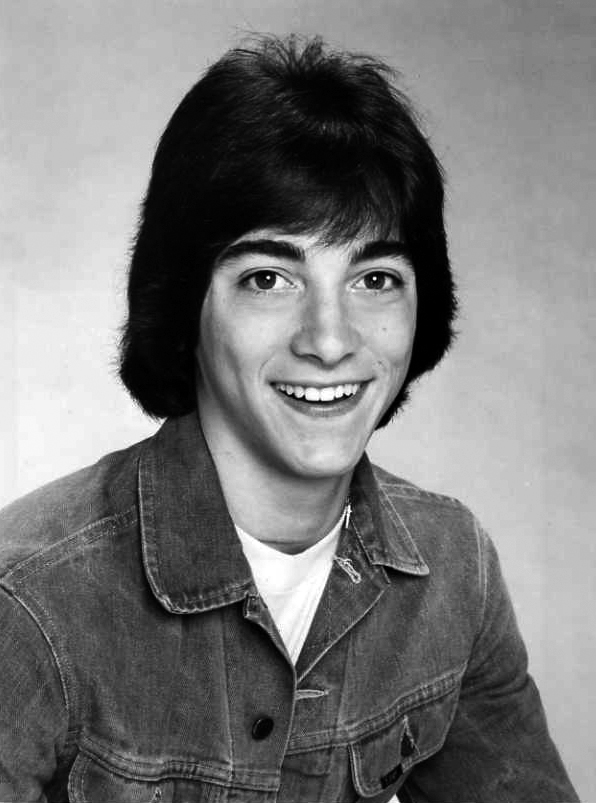
- Scott Baio as Chachi Arcola in a 1982 publicity photograph
- First appearance: "Hollywood" - Part 1 (1977)
- Last appearance: "Passages" (1984)
- Created by: Garry Marshall
- Portrayed by: Scott Baio

In-universe information
- Gender: Man
- Occupation: Helper at Fonzie's Garage and at Arnold's, student, musician
- Family: Louisa Delvecchio (mother)
- Spouse: Joanie Cunningham
- Relatives: Rico Mastorelli (uncle); Arthur Fonzarelli (cousin); Al Delvecchio (stepfather); Spike Fonzarelli (cousin); Annette Mastorelli (cousin)
- Nationality: Italian American

Charles "Chachi" Arcola is a character played by Scott Baio on the sitcom Happy Days and its spin-off Joanie Loves Chachi.

The character of Chachi is the younger cousin of Fonzie, first appearing on Happy Days in season 5, beginning in 1977. His main love interest is Joanie Cunningham, with their relationship becoming a common theme for episodes in later seasons. Chachi shares a close relationship with his older cousin Fonzie. Many times, Fonzie stepped in and was able to be the older brother figure that Chachi needed. Chachi is also very close to his mother and his stepfather Al.

Together, Chachi and Joanie became aspiring musicians, and the spinoff series Joanie Loves Chachi was developed when Chachi's mother Louisa and new stepfather Al Delvecchio (the second owner of Arnold's) opened a new restaurant where Joanie and Chachi performed most of their music.

Joanie and Chachi, along with some of his cousins and a character named Bingo, form a band, which was never named in the series.

Joanie and Chachi returned to Happy Days when Joanie Loves Chachi was cancelled, and after them being broken up for a while in the final Happy Days episode, Joanie and Chachi marry.

== Development and reception ==
After his initial appearance, the character of Chachi was expanded to a recurring character due to positive reception by fans, with Baio receiving up to 5,000 fan letters a week. The name was given by Ron Howard's long-term friend, Andrew Smith. When the writers began developing the character of Chachi as a musician, Baio was against the idea because he "didn't sing," but changed his mind based on the possibility of the fame associated with becoming a pop singer. His early catchphrase "Wah, wah, wah!" became popular with teenage girls. However, an attempt to spark a fashion trend by having Chachi frequently costumed with a bandana tied around his pant leg did not catch on.

The character was named after a street where the show's creator Garry Marshall had lived. There have been false rumors that circulated claiming that the broadcast of Joanie Loves Chachi had high viewership numbers in Japan and Korea because the name "Chachi" sounds like slang term for "penis" in those countries.

Later in 2005, Baio joined the cast of Arrested Development which also featured two stars of Happy Days, Ron Howard (executive producer and narrator) and Henry Winkler (as the incompetent lawyer Barry Zuckerkorn). In Season Three, Episode Three, Baio's character, the potentially new lawyer Bob Loblaw, states "look, this is not the first time I’ve been brought in to replace Barry Zuckerkorn. I think I can do for you everything he did. Plus, I skew younger. With juries and so forth." Vulture further argues that this statement is "a nod to Happy Days, where [Baio] was brought on as Chachi, to be a new teen idol as Henry Winkler got older."
