= List of Henry Winkler performances =

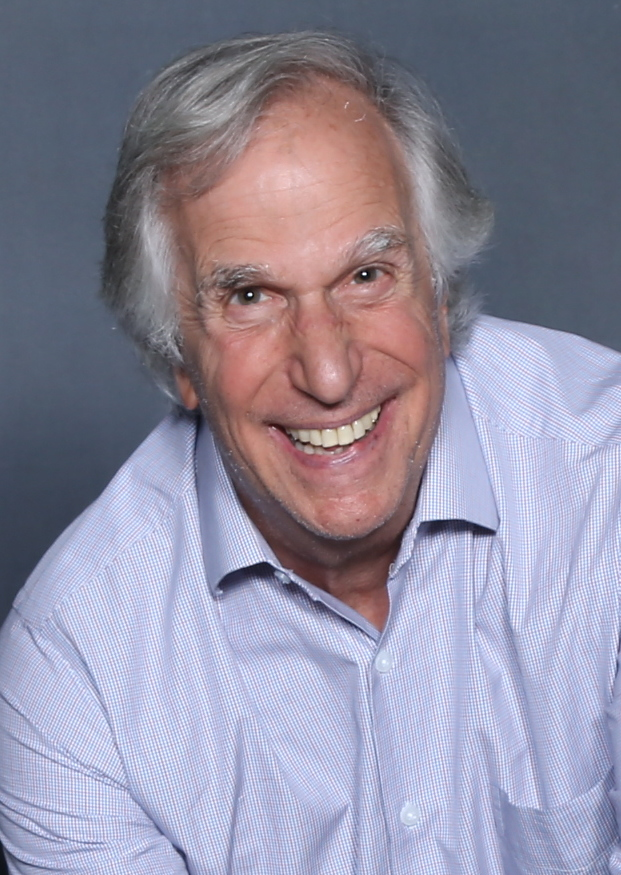
Winkler at the Raleigh Supercon in 2018

Henry Franklin Winkler (born October 30, 1945) is an American actor, producer, and director.

== General overview ==
Winkler grew up in New York and was a student in the Yale School of Drama. During the summers, he and his Yale classmates stayed in New Haven and opened a summer stock theater called the "New Haven Free Theater." They performed various plays including Woyzeck, and Just Add Water (improv night). He also performed in the political piece The American Pig at the Joseph Papp Public Theater for the New York Shakespeare Festival in New York City, along with classmates James Keach, James Naughton, and Jill Eikenberry.

After graduation, he joined the Yale Repertory Theatre company. During the 1970-71 season, Winkler appeared in Story Theater Repertory (October 1970) as the Rabbi in Gimpel the Fool (and also appeared in Saint Julian the Hospitaler and Olympian Games). He also appeared as the youngest son in The Revenger's Tragedy (Nov-December, 1970), Tommy's nephew in Where Has Tommy Flowers Gone? (January 1971), Young Siward in Macbeth (Feb-March 1971), Andres in Woyzeck and Play (April 1971), and Master of Ceremonies/Prow/Couple 2/Horses/Milliner in Two by Brecht and Weill: The Little Mahagonny and The Seven Deadly Sins (May–June, 1971 and January 20–29, 1972.

Winkler then moved back to New York, working in theater, television commercials, and the independent film The Lords of Flatbush (1974), with then unknown Sylvester Stallone. After a short period in Los Angeles, he won the role of Arthur "Fonzie" Fonzarelli (on the 1974-1984 American television series Happy Days). He also portrayed Jack Dunne in Heroes (1977), Andy in the Carl Reiner film The One and Only (1978), and Chuck Lumley in Ron Howard's Night Shift (1982). In addition, he gained recognition as an executive producer for works such as MacGyver, Dead Man's Gun, the CBS Schoolbreak Special: "All the Kids Do It", Hollywood Squares, and Who Are the DeBolts? And Where Did They Get Nineteen Kids?

Winkler has evolved into a character actor, portraying roles such as the high school principal Arthur Himbry in Scream, Coach Klein in Adam Sandler's The Waterboy, Barry Zuckerkorn in Arrested Development, Sy Mittleman in Childrens Hospital, Dr. Saperstein in Parks and Recreation, Mr. Rock in the Hank Zipzer BBC series, Eddie R. Lawson in Royal Pains, Fritz in Monsters at Work, Uncle Joe in The French Dispatch, Al Pratt (Uncle Al) in Black Adam, and Gene Cousineau in Barry. He also appears in five Christmas films: An American Christmas Carol as Benedict Slade (1979), Katharine Hepburn's last film One Christmas as Dad (1994), The Most Wonderful Time of the Year as Uncle Ralph (2008), Mr. Rock in Hank Zipzer's Christmas Catastrophe (2016), and Grandpa Bill in All I Want for Christmas Is You (2017). In 1986, he directed Dolly Parton in A Smoky Mountain Christmas.

== Film ==
Year	Title	Credited as				Notes	Ref(s)
Year	Title	Actor	Producer	Director	Role(s)	Notes	Ref(s)
1974	Crazy Joe	Yes	No	No	Mannie		
1974	The Lords of Flatbush	Yes	No	No	Butchey Weinstein		
1977	Heroes	Yes	No	No	Jack Dunne		
1978	The One and Only	Yes	No	No	Andy Schmidt	Directed by Carl Reiner	
1982	Night Shift	Yes	No	No	Chuck Lumley	Ron Howard's second theatrical film as a director	
1985	Young Sherlock Holmes	No	Yes	No		Producer	
1985	The Sure Thing	No	Yes	No		Executive producer Rob Reiner's second film as a director	
1988	Memories of Me	No	No	Yes		Director	
1989	Asterix and the Big Fight	Yes	No	No	Asterix	Voice	
1993	Cop and a Half	No	No	Yes			
1996	Scream	Yes	No	No	Principal Arthur Himbry	Uncredited	
1998	The Waterboy	Yes	No	No	Coach Klein	First film with Adam Sandler	
1998	Ground Control	Yes	No	No	John Quinn		
2000	Little Nicky	Yes	No	No	Himself	Cameo; film with Adam Sandler	
2000	Down to You	Yes	No	No	Chef Ray		
2003	Holes	Yes	No	No	Stanley Yelnats III		
2005	Berkeley	Yes	No	No	Sy Sweet		
2005	The Kid & I	Yes	No	No	Johnny Bernstein		
2006	Click	Yes	No	No	Ted Newman	Film with Adam Sandler	
2006	Unbeatable Harold	Yes	No	No	Fullerton		
2007	I Could Never Be Your Woman	Yes	No	No	Himself		
2007	A Plumm Summer	Yes	No	No	Happy Herb		
2008	You Don't Mess with the Zohan	Yes	No	No	Cameo	Film with Adam Sandler	
2008	The Most Wonderful Time of the Year	Yes	No	No	Uncle Ralph		
2010	Group Sex	Yes	No	No	Burton		
2011	Still Screaming: The Ultimate Scary Movie Retrospective	Yes	No	No	Himself	Documentary film	
2012	Here Comes the Boom	Yes	No	No	Marty Streb		
2015	Larry Gaye: Renegade Male Flight Attendant	Yes	No	No	Stanley Warner		
2016	Donald Trump's The Art of the Deal: The Movie	Yes	No	No	Ed Koch		
2017	Sandy Wexler	Yes	No	No	Cameo	Film with Adam Sandler	
2017	All I Want for Christmas Is You	Yes	No	No	Grandpa Bill	Voice	
2020	Scoob!	Yes	No	No	Keith	Voice	
2020	Pink Skies Ahead	Yes	No	No	Dr. Cotton		
2021	On the Count of Three	Yes	No	No	Dr. Brenner		
2021	Extinct	Yes	No	No	Jepson	Voice	
2021	The French Dispatch	Yes	No	No	Uncle Joe	Directed by Wes Anderson	
2022	Scream	Yes	No	No	Partygoer	Cameo; Voice	
2022	Family Squares	Yes	No	No	Bobby		
2022	Black Adam	Yes	No	No	Al Pratt (Uncle Al)	Cameo	
2025	Normal	Yes	No	No	Mayor of Normal		
2026	Gail Daughtry and the Celebrity Sex Pass	Yes	No	No	Himself		
2026	Rolling Loud	Yes	No	No	Ferguson		
2026	Hexed †	Yes	No	No	Nigel	Post-production; Voice	

== Television ==
Year	Title	Credited as				Notes	Ref(s)
Year	Title	Actor	Producer	Director	Role(s)	Notes	Ref(s)
1973	The Mary Tyler Moore Show	Yes	No	No	Steve Waldman	Episode: "The Dinner Party"	
1974–1984	Happy Days	Yes	No	No	Arthur "Fonzie" Fonzarelli	Main role; all 255 episodes	
1974	Nightmare	Yes	No	No	Auditioning Actor	Television film; uncredited	
1974	The Bob Newhart Show	Yes	No	No	Miles Lascoe	Episode: "Clink Shrink"	
1975	Katherine	Yes	No	No	Bob Kline	Television film	
1976–1979	Laverne & Shirley	Yes	No	No	Arthur "Fonzie" Fonzarelli	5 episodes	
1977	The CBS Festival of Lively Arts for Young People	Yes	No	No	Himself/Romeo	Episode: "Henry Winkler Meets William Shakespeare"	
1978	Who Are the DeBolts? And Where Did They Get Nineteen Kids?	Yes	Yes	No	Host	Executive producer	
1978	Mork & Mindy	Yes	No	No	Arthur "Fonzie" Fonzarelli	Episode: "Pilot"	
1979	An American Christmas Carol	Yes	No	No	Benedict Slade	Television film	
1979	Music for UNICEF Concert	Yes	No	No	Co-Host (with Danny Kaye and Gilda Radner)	Benefit concert that included the Bee Gees and Earth, Wind, & Fire.	
1980–1982	The Fonz and the Happy Days Gang	Yes	No	No	Arthur Fonzerelli/Fonzie	Voice, 24 episodes	
1980	Sesame Street	Yes	No	No	Arthur Fonzerelli/Fonzie	Episode #12.8	
1981	ABC Afterschool Special: Run, Don’t Walk	No	Yes	No		Executive producer Starring Scott Baio; Based on the novel of the same name by Harriet May Savitz	
1982	Mork & Mindy/Laverne & Shirley/Fonz Hour	Yes	No	No	Arthur Fonzerelli/Fonzie	Voice, 20 episodes	
1982	Joanie Loves Chachi	Yes	No	Yes	Arthur Fonzerelli/Fonzie	Episode: "Fonzie's Visit"; Director (Episode: "Best Foot Forward")	
1983	Starflight: The Plane That Couldn't Land	No	Yes	No		Television film; also executive producer	
1983	Ryan's Four	No	Yes	No		5 episodes; also executive producer	
1984	CBS Schoolbreak Special: "All the Kids Do It"	No	Yes	Yes		Television film	
1984	Strong Kids, Safe Kids	Yes	Yes	No	Himself/Arthur "Fonzie" Fonzarelli	Television film; also executive producer	
1985	Scandal Sheet	No	Yes	No		Television film	
1985–1992	MacGyver	Yes	Yes	No	Wilton Newberry	Episode: "Harry's Will"; also executive producer	
1986	A Smoky Mountain Christmas	No	No	Yes		Director; Starring Dolly Parton	
1988	ABC Afterschool Special: A Family Again	No	Yes	No		Executive producer; Starring Jill Eikenberry and Michael Tucker	
1991	Absolute Strangers	Yes	No	No	Marty Klein	Television film	
1991–1997	Sightings	No	Yes	No		Executive producer	
1992	Happy Days: The Reunion	Yes	No	No	Himself (host)	Television special	
1993	The Only Way Out	Yes	No	No	Tony	Television film	
1994	Monty	Yes	Yes	No	Monty Richardson	13 episodes; also executive producer	
1994	One Christmas	Yes	No	No	Dad	Starring Katharine Hepburn and Swoosie Kurtz; Adapted from the 1983 short story "One Christmas" by Truman Capote	
1995	Dave's World	No	No	Yes	Dad	Director (Episode: "The Green-Eyed Monster")	
1995	The Larry Sanders Show	Yes	No	No	Himself	Episode: "Hank's Sex Tape"	
1995	A Child Is Missing	Yes	No	No	Steven Moore	Television film	
1996	Dad's Week Off	Yes	No	No	Jack Potter	Television film	
1997, 1999	Dead Man's Gun	Yes	Yes	No	Phineas Newman / Hangman, Leo Sunshine / John Hays	2 episodes; also executive producer	
1997	Clueless	No	No	Yes		Director (2 episodes)	
1997	Detention: The Siege at Johnson High	Yes	No	No	Skip Fine	Television film	
1998	South Park	Yes	No	No	Kid-Eating Monster	Voice, episode: "City on the Edge of Forever"	
1999–2001	So Weird	No	Yes	No		Executive producer	
1999	The Simpsons	Yes	No	No	Ramrod	Voice, episode: "Take My Wife, Sleaze"	
1999–2000	The Practice	Yes	No	No	Dr. Henry Olson	3 episodes	
2000	Battery Park	Yes	No	No	Walter Dunleavy	Episode: "Walter's Rib"	
2000–2002	Sabrina the Teenage Witch	No	No	Yes		Director (2 episodes)	
2001	The Drew Carey Show	Yes	No	No	Mr. Newsome	Episode: "It's Halloween, Dummy"	
2002	Ozzy & Drix	Yes	No	No	Sal Monella	Voice, episode: "The Globfather"	
2002	Law & Order: Special Victims Unit	Yes	No	No	Edwin Todd / Edward Crandall	Episode: "Greed"	
2002–2004	Hollywood Squares	Yes	Yes	No	Himself/Panelist	5 episodes; also executive producer	
2003	Clifford the Big Red Dog	Yes	No	No	Artie	Voice, episode: "Led Astray"	
2003–2005	Clifford's Puppy Days	Yes	No	No	Norville	Voice, 18 episodes	
2003–2019	Arrested Development	Yes	No	No	Barry Zuckerkorn	32 episodes (2003–2005; 2013–2019)	
2004	Third Watch	Yes	No	No	Lester Martin	3 episodes	
2004	King of the Hill	Yes	No	No	Himself	Voice, episode: "A Rover Runs Through It"	
2005	Happy Days: 30th Anniversary Reunion	Yes	Yes	No	Himself	TV special; also executive producer	
2005	Duck Dodgers	Yes	No	No	Dr. Maniac	Voice, 2 episodes	
2005	Crossing Jordan	Yes	No	No	Dr. Jack Slocum	2 episodes	
2005–2006	Out of Practice	Yes	No	No	Dr. Stewart Barnes	Main cast	
2006	The Interviews: An Oral History of Television	Yes	No	No	Himself	Episode: "Henry Winkler"	
2007	Odd Job Jack	Yes	No	No	Devon	Voice, episode: "Jack Ryder's Unofficial High School Reunion"	
2008	Merry Christmas, Drake & Josh	Yes	No	No	Judge Newman	Television film	
2008	The Most Wonderful Time of the Year	Yes	No	No	Uncle Ralph	Television film	
2008–2009	NUMB3RS	Yes	No	No	Roger Bloom	3 episodes	
2009	Sit Down, Shut Up	Yes	No	No	Willard Deutschebog	Voice, 13 episodes	
2010–2016	Childrens Hospital	Yes	No	No	Sy Mittleman	Main cast, 54 episodes	
2010–2016	Royal Pains	Yes	No	No	Eddie R. Lawson	25 episodes	
2010–2013	Hero Factory	Yes	No	No	Professor Nathaniel Zib	Voice, 8 episodes	
2010–2012	Kick Buttowski: Suburban Daredevil	Yes	No	No	Principal Henry	Voice, 3 episodes	
2011	Batman: The Brave and the Bold	Yes	No	No	Ambush Bug	Voice, episode: "Mitefall!"	
2011	Dan Vs.	Yes	No	No	Helicopter Hal	Voice, episode: "Traffic"	
2012	Handy Manny	Yes	No	No	Mr. Diller	Voice, episode: "St. Patrick's Day"	
2012	Up All Night	Yes	No	No	Marty Alexander	Episode: "Daddy Daughter Time"	
2013	1600 Penn	Yes	No	No	Senator Nathan Faxler	Episode: "The Short Happy Life of Reba Cadbury"	
2013–2015	Parks and Recreation	Yes	No	No	Dr. Lu Saperstein	8 episodes	
2014, 2017	Penn Zero: Part-Time Hero	Yes	No	No	The Snowman	Voice, 2 episodes	
2014–2017	All Hail King Julien	Yes	No	No	King Julien XII	Voice, 16 episodes	
2014–2016	Hank Zipzer	Yes	No	No	Mr. Rock	Main cast, 25 episodes (Based on his Hank Zipzer series of children's books)	
2014	Hollywood Game Night	Yes	No	No	Himself	Episode: "How I Met Your Buzzer"	
2015	Comedy Bang! Bang!	Yes	No	No	Leonard Rascal	Episode: "Kid Cudi Wears a Denim Shirt and Red Sneakers"	
2015	BoJack Horseman	Yes	No	No	Himself	Voice, episode: "Still Broken"	
2015	Drunk History	Yes	No	No	Zenas Fisk Wilber	Episode: "Inventors"	
2015	Bob's Burgers	Yes	No	No	Mall Santa	Voice, episode: "Nice-Capades"	
2016	New Girl	Yes	No	No	Flip	Episode: "What About Fred"	
2016	Hank Zipzer's Christmas Catastrophe	Yes	No	No	Mr. Rock	Television film	
2016, 2025	SpongeBob SquarePants	Yes	No	No	Sharkface, Jeff Tentacles	Voice, 3 episodes	
2016–2018	Better Late Than Never	Yes	Yes	No	Himself	Main cast and executive producer, 12 episodes	
2016–2021	MacGyver	No	Yes	No		Executive producer	
2017	Puppy Dog Pals	Yes	No	No	Santa Claus	Voice, 6 episodes	
2018–2023	Barry	Yes	No	No	Gene Cousineau	Main role	
2019	Guardians of the Galaxy	Yes	No	No	Mr. Quill	Voice, episode: "Just One Victory"	
2019	American Dad!	Yes	No	No	Child Protection Services Agent	Voice, episode: "Mom Sauce"	
2019	Welcome to the Wayne	Yes	No	No	Leo Wasserman	Voice, episode: "Welcome to the Wassermans"	
2019, 2021	Vampirina	Yes	No	No	Uncle Dieter	Voice, 2 episodes	
2020	Medical Police	Yes	No	No	Sy Mittleman	2 episodes	
2020	Bubble Guppies	Yes	No	No	Yeti	Voice, Episode: "Snow Squad to the Rescue!"	
2021	DuckTales	Yes	No	No	Bailiff	Voice, episode: "The Life and Crimes of Scrooge McDuck!"	
2021	Central Park	Yes	No	No	Hank Zevansky	Voice, episode: "The Shadow"	
2021	Inside Job	Yes	No	No	Melvin Stupowitz	Voice, episode: "Buzzkill"	
2021	Fairfax	Yes	No	No	Bernie	Voice, episode: "Fairfolks"	
2021–2024	Monsters at Work	Yes	No	No	Fritz	Voice, main cast	
2021–2026	Rugrats	Yes	No	No	Boris Kropotkin	Voice, recurring role	
2022	Human Resources	Yes	No	No	Keith From Grief	Voice, recurring role	
2022	Close Enough	Yes	No	No	Alex's Dad	Voice, episode: "Hellspital/Candice Candice Revolution"	
2022	Chanshi	Yes	No	No	Tatty	Recurring role	
2022	Wolfboy and the Everything Factory	Yes	No	No	Mountain Ancient	Voice, episode: "We Search Below"	
2022	Reindeer in Here	Yes	No	No	Smiley	Voice, television special	
2023	The Legend of Vox Machina	Yes	No	No	Wilhand Trickfoot	Voice, 2 episodes	
2023	Quarterback	Yes	No	No	Himself	Episode: "Mind Games"	
2023	Family Guy	Yes	No	No	Lead Elderly	Voice, episode: "Old World Harm"	
2024	American Horror Stories	Yes	No	No	Dr. Eric Nostrum	Episode: "X"	
2025	Hazardous History with Henry Winkler	Yes	No	No	Himself	Host; 20 episodes	
2025	Loot	Yes	No	No	Gerald	Episode: "Bye-Bye Mode"	
2026	Life, Larry and the Pursuit of Unhappiness	Yes	No	No	John Hancock	Episode: "Livingston"	
2026	Rock Paper Scissors	Yes	No	No	Himself	Voice; episode: "The Henry Winkler Episode"	
2026	SuperKitties	Yes	No	No	Uncle Tony	Voice; 2 episodes	

== Theater ==
=== Yale School of Drama (1967–1970) ===
Winkler appeared in They Told Me That You Came This Way, Any Day Now, Any Day Now, and The Bacchae (as a member of the chorus). During the summers, he and his Yale classmates stayed in New Haven, and opened a summer stock theater called the New Haven Free Theater. They performed various plays including Woyzeck, where he portrayed the title role, and Just Add Water for improv night. He also performed in the political piece, The American Pig at the Joseph Papp Public Theater for the New York Shakespeare Festival in New York City, with classmates James Keach, James Naughton, and Jill Eikenberry. In addition, he also appeared in a number of Yale Repertory Theatre productions while still a student, including, The Government Inspector, The Rhesus Umbrella, Don Juan, Endgame, and The Physicists. He also appeared in Sweeney Agonistes and Hughie.

=== Yale Repertory Theater (1970–1972) ===
After receiving his MFA in 1970, Winkler was one of three students from his graduating class of 11 who were invited to become a part of the Yale Repertory Theatre company. He joined on June 30, 1970, was paid $173 a week, and appeared throughout the 1970–71 season. He performed in Story Theater Reportory, Gimpel the Fool and Saint Julian the Hospitaler and Olympian Games. He also appeared in The Revenger's Tragedy, Where Has Tommy Flowers Gone?, Macbeth, and Woyzeck and Play. He also appeared in a double feature of two works by Bertolt Brecht, The Seven Deadly Sins (ballet chanté), and The Little Mahagonny during May–June 1971 and during January 20–29, 1972.

=== 1973–present ===
Date	Title	Theatre	Role	Ref(s)
March 11, 1973	42 Seconds from Broadway	Playhouse Theatre (New York City)	John	
October 3, 2000 – June 10, 2001	The Dinner Party	Music Box Theatre	Albert Donay	
2006	Peter Pan	New Wimbledon Theatre, London	Captain Hook	
2007	Peter Pan	Woking	Captain Hook	
2008–2009	Peter Pan	Milton Keynes Theatre	Captain Hook	
2009–2010	Peter Pan	Liverpool Empire.	Captain Hook	
November 14, 2012 – November 18, 2012	The Performers	Longacre Theatre	Chuck Wood	

== See also ==
- List of awards and nominations received by Henry Winkler
