= List of awards and nominations received by Henry Winkler =

Henry Winkler awards and nominations
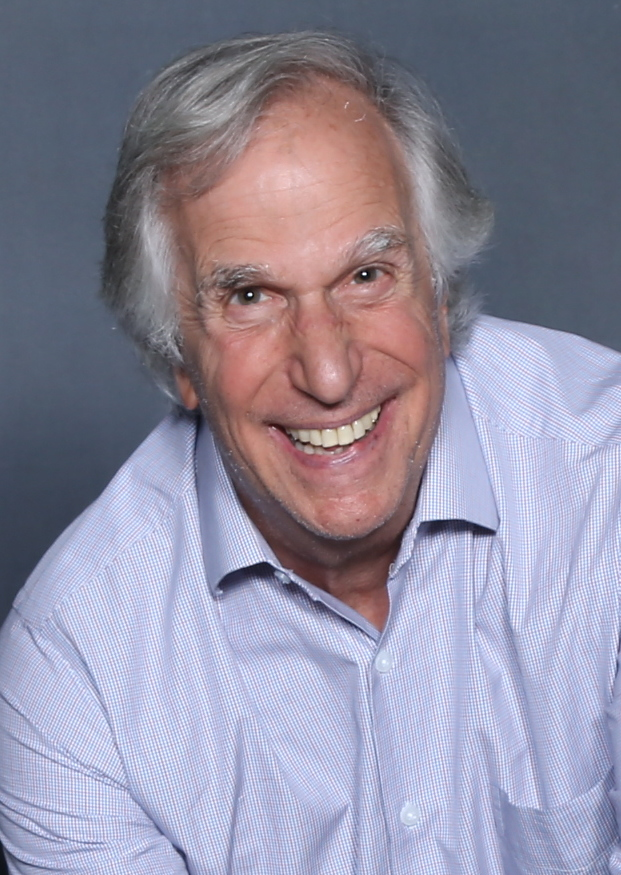
- Winkler at the Raleigh Supercon in 2018
Award	Wins	Nominations
CableACE Awards	0	1
Critics' Choice Television Awards	2	4
Daytime Emmy Awards	2	5
Emmy Awards (Primetime)	1	9
Genesis Awards	1	1
Golden Globe Awards	2	7
Hollywood Critics Association TV Awards	1	1
Screen Actors Guild Awards	0	6
Bronze Wrangler	1	1
Total	10	32

Henry Franklin Winkler (born October 30, 1945) is an American actor, executive producer, and director.

Winkler initially rose to fame for his role as Arthur "Fonzie" Fonzarelli (on the 1974-1984 American television series Happy Days), winning two Golden Globe Awards and three Emmy Award nominations for Outstanding Lead Actor in a Comedy Series for the role.

He also earned a nomination for the Golden Globe Award for Best Actor – Motion Picture Drama for his portrayal of Jack Dunne in Heroes (1977), and was nominated for the Golden Globe Award for Best Actor – Motion Picture Musical or Comedy for his role as Chuck Lumley in the film Night Shift (1982). In addition, he gained recognition as an executive producer, winning a Genesis Award for MacGyver, the Bronze Wrangler for Dead Man's Gun, and the Daytime Emmy for Outstanding Children's Special for the CBS Schoolbreak Special: "All the Kids Do It."

He also received a Daytime Emmy nomination for Hollywood Squares, and a Primetime Emmy nomination for the televised version of Who Are the DeBolts? And Where Did They Get Nineteen Kids?. Winkler was nominated for a Primetime Emmy, Outstanding Guest Actor in a Drama Series, for his role as Dr. Henry Olson on The Practice. He also portrayed Barry Zuckerkorn in Arrested Development

For his role as Gene Cousineau in the HBO series Barry he received the 2018 Primetime Emmy Award for Outstanding Supporting Actor in a Comedy Series, his first ever Primetime Emmy Award. He also received numerous accolades such as the Critics' Choice Television Award for Best Supporting Actor in a Comedy Series (2019) and (2023), Hollywood Critics Association TV Awards (2022) as well as nominations for two Golden Globe Awards, and six Screen Actors Guild Awards.

== Major Associations ==
=== Emmy Awards ===
Year	Category	Nominated work	Result	Ref.
Primetime Emmy Awards
1976	Outstanding Lead Actor in a Comedy Series	Happy Days	Nominated	
1977	Outstanding Lead Actor in a Comedy Series	Happy Days	Nominated	
1978	Outstanding Lead Actor in a Comedy Series	Happy Days	Nominated	
1979	Outstanding Informational Program	Who Are the DeBolts? And Where Did They Get Nineteen Kids?	Nominated	
2000	Outstanding Guest Actor in a Drama Series	The Practice	Nominated	
2000	Outstanding Guest Actor in a Comedy Series	Battery Park †	Nominated	
2018	Outstanding Supporting Actor in a Comedy Series	Barry	Won	
2019	Outstanding Supporting Actor in a Comedy Series	Barry	Nominated	
2022	Outstanding Supporting Actor in a Comedy Series	Barry	Nominated	
2023	Outstanding Supporting Actor in a Comedy Series	Barry	Nominated	
Daytime Emmy Awards
1985	Outstanding Children's Special	CBS Schoolbreak Special: "All the Kids Do It"	Won	
1985	Outstanding Directing in Children's Programming	CBS Schoolbreak Special: "All the Kids Do It"	Nominated	
2003	Outstanding Game Show	Hollywood Squares	Nominated	
2004	Outstanding Performer in an Animated Program	Clifford's Puppy Days	Nominated	
2005	Outstanding Performer in an Animated Program	Clifford's Puppy Days	Won	

† Nomination withdrawn when it was pointed out later that the episode had aired after the Emmy's May 31 deadline.

=== Golden Globe Awards ===
Year	Category	Nominated work	Result	Ref.
1977	Best Actor – Television Series Musical or Comedy	Happy Days	Won	
1978	Best Actor – Television Series Musical or Comedy ††	Happy Days	Won	
1978	Best Actor – Motion Picture Drama	Heroes	Nominated	
1983	Best Actor – Motion Picture Musical or Comedy	Night Shift	Nominated	
2019	Best Supporting Actor – Series, Miniseries or Television Film	Barry	Nominated	
2020	Best Supporting Actor – Series, Miniseries or Television Film	Barry	Nominated	
2023	Best Supporting Actor – Series, Miniseries or Television Film	Barry	Nominated	

†† Tied with Ron Howard, also for Happy Days

=== Screen Actors Guild Awards ===
Year	Category	Nominated work	Result	Ref.
2014	Outstanding Ensemble in a Comedy Series	Arrested Development	Nominated	
2019	Outstanding Actor in a Comedy Series	Barry	Nominated	
2019	Outstanding Ensemble in a Comedy Series	Barry	Nominated	
2020	Outstanding Ensemble in a Comedy Series	Barry	Nominated	
2023	Outstanding Ensemble in a Comedy Series	Barry	Nominated	
2024	Outstanding Ensemble in a Comedy Series	Barry	Nominated	

== Miscellaneous awards ==
=== CableACE Award ===
Year	Category	Recipient/Nominated work	Role(s)	Result	Ref
1997 (19th)	Guest Actor in a Dramatic Special or Series	Dead Man's Gun	Leo Sunshine / John Hays	Nominated	

=== Critics' Choice Television Award ===
Year	Category	Recipient/Nominated work	Role(s)	Result	Ref.
2019 (24th)	Best Supporting Actor in a Comedy Series	Barry	Gene Cousineau	Won	
2020 (25th)	Best Supporting Actor in a Comedy Series	Barry	Gene Cousineau	Nominated	
2023 (28th)	Best Supporting Actor in a Comedy Series	Barry	Gene Cousineau	Won	
2024 (29th)	Best Supporting Actor in a Comedy Series	Barry	Gene Cousineau	Nominated	

=== Genesis Awards ===
Year	Category	Recipient/Nominated work	Role(s)	Result	Ref
1991	Best TV Drama Series	MacGyver	executive producer	Won	

=== Hollywood Critics Association TV Awards ===
Year	Category	Recipient/Nominated work	Role(s)	Result	Ref
2022	Best Supporting Actor in a Broadcast Network or Cable Series, Comedy	Barry	Gene Cousineau	Won	

=== Western Heritage Awards ===
Year	Category	Recipient/Nominated work	Role(s)	Result	Ref
1998	Bronze Wrangler, Fictional Television Drama	Dead Man's Gun	executive producer	Won	

== Honors ==
Honors	Year	Category	Recipient	Result	Ref
Mardi Gras in New Orleans	1977	9th King of the Krewe of Bacchus Parade	Henry Winkler	Won	
National Museum of American History, Smithsonian Institution	February 13, 1980	Winkler donates one of the "Fonzie" leather jackets to the Smithsonian	NA	Won	
American Academy of Achievement	1980	Golden Plate Award	Henry Winkler	Won	
Hollywood Walk of Fame	1981	Star on the Walk of Fame for Television	Henry Winkler	Won	
Golden Apple Award	1982	Louella Parsons Award	Henry Winkler	Won	
Women in Film Crystal + Lucy Awards	1988	Norma Zarky Humanitarian award	Stacey and Henry Winkler	Won	
The Bronze Fonz	August 19, 2008	Unveiling of a life-sized, bronze statue of Fonzie along the Milwaukee Riverwalk	Henry Winkler	Won	
Key to the City of Winnipeg	March 29, 2010	For contributions to education and literacy	Henry Winkler	Won	
Order of the British Empire	2011	Appointed an Honorary Officer of the Order of the British Empire (OBE) "for services to children with special educational needs and dyslexia in the UK"	Henry Winkler	Won	
National Literacy Trust	2013	Named one of the United Kingdom's Top 10 Literacy Heroes	Henry Winkler	Won	
ATX Television Festival	2014	ATX Television Excellence Award winners	Henry Winkler	Won	
Banff World Media Festival	2014	Award of Excellence	Henry Winkler	Won	
13th Annual American Spirit Awards	2019	Caucus Legend Award	Henry Winkler	Won	
Los Angeles Press Club	2019	The Bill Rosendahl Public Service Award for Contributions to the Public Good (for his children's books)	Henry Winkler	Won	

== See also ==
- List of Henry Winkler performances
