= Robert Lovenheim =

American film producer

Robert Lovenheim is a film and television writer and producer.

== Biography ==
Lovenheim is a television producer. He studied film at the University of Southern California, and his career began at Columbia Pictures where he supervised new development and feature films. He then moved into the television arm of Columbia to head long-form development of series and miniseries. He has executive produced as an independent producer over 35 movies such as A Smoky Mountain Christmas starring Dolly Parton as well as mini-series and TV pilots for HBO, CBS, ABC and NBC. His productions have won numerous awards including an Emmy. He is the founder of Movie With Me a movie site specializing in foreign and independent films.

== TV movies produced ==
- The O.J. Simpson Story (1995).... executive producer
- A Family Torn Apart (1993)....executive producer
- The Last of His Tribe (1992)....producer
- The Revenge of Al Capone (1989)....producer
- A Smoky Mountain Christmas (1987)....producer
- The Defiant Ones (1986)....producer
- Gladiator (1986)....producer
- Shattered Vows (1985)....producer
- Starcrossed (1985)....producer
- Off Sides (1984)....producer
- Fire on the Mountain (1981)....producer
- A Whale for the Killing (1981)....producer
- Happily Ever After (1979)....producer
- Long Journey Back (1979)....producer
- Telethon (1978)....producer
- Minstrel Man (1977)....producer
- Promise Him Anything (1975)....producer
- Larry (1974)....producer

== TV series produced ==
- Big Shamus, Little Shamus (1979).....producer
- Dirty Dancing....producer
- Lottery! (1983–1984)....producer
- Sledge Hammer! (1986–1988)....executive producer

== TV mini-series produced ==
- Elvis and Me (1988)....producer

== TV specials produced ==
- Sheriff and the Astronaut (1984)....producer
- Gabe and Walker (1981)....producer
- Newman's Drugstore (1976)....producer
