= Memories of Me =

1988 film by Henry Winkler

- Theatrical release poster
- Directed by: Henry Winkler
- Written by: Billy Crystal; Eric Roth
- Produced by: Alan King; Billy Crystal; Michael Hertzberg
- Starring: Billy Crystal; Alan King; JoBeth Williams
- Cinematography: Andrew Dintenfass
- Edited by: Peter E. Berger
- Music by: Georges Delerue
- Production company: Metro-Goldwyn-Mayer
- Distributed by: Metro-Goldwyn-Mayer (MGM/UA Communications)
- Release dates: September 14, 1988 (Toronto International Film Festival); September 30, 1988 (New York)
- Running time: 105 minutes
- Country: United States
- Language: English
- Budget: $12 million
- Box office: $4 millon

Memories of Me is a 1988 American comedy-drama film by director Henry Winkler, starring Billy Crystal, Alan King, and JoBeth Williams.

This was the first theatrically released film directed by Winkler, who had previously directed the TV movie A Smoky Mountain Christmas. Much of it was filmed inside the MGM Studios in Culver City, California, only a few miles from Hollywood.

== Plot ==
Abbie Polin, a New York heart surgeon, has a heart attack in the middle of surgery. An expert, he is able to instruct his colleagues on exactly what to give him and do to minimize the damage.

Abbie is later placed in a room and put on monitors. Fighting off sleep triggers a childhood memory in which he also resisted sleeping with his unsympathetic dad.

Watching old home movies with Lisa, the romantic interest in Abbie's life and pediatrician in the hospital, she asks about his family. His parents divorced when he was seven, and she is shocked when he admits his father is still living, as he´d talked as if he wasn't. His mother lives in Vermont.

Abbie goes to Los Angeles to see his father, Abe, who works in Hollywood as the "king of the extras." Their relationship has been strained for several years. Immediately upon arrival, Abbie accompanies him to a job where he is acting as a patient in a hospital.

Afterwards, they go to a bar where extras go, and Abe proves to be popular. He asks about Abbie's mom then asks why he's there. When told he had a heart attack, Abe disappears, calling Abbie with the bar's pay phone to avoid too intimate of an interaction.

Abe insists Abbie stay in his apartment, but he won't take time off from work while he's there. While he's shooting, Lisa comes for a surprise visit. She and Abe bond well, just as he gets along famously with everyone but his son. Abe begins having memory loss which Abbie and Lisa observe while he's shooting.

The couple plans to head back to NYC, but Abe reroutes them to Mexican LA. He continues to show signs of confusion, so Abbie takes him to a medical facility. After running some tests he eventually diagnoses him with an inoperable brain aneurysm.

Father and son grow closer in time, doing things together they hadn't before, like riding ponies, fishing... and, before it's too late, Abbie helps Abe get a speaking role in a film.

== Cast ==
- Billy Crystal as Dr. Abbie Polin, M.D.
- Alan King as Abe Polin
- JoBeth Williams as Dr. Lisa McConnell M.D.
- David Ackroyd as 1st Assistant Director
- Chris Aable as Himself (as host of "Hollywood Today")
- Phil Fondacaro as Horace Bosco
- Sidney Miller as Slow-Burn
- Robert Pastorelli as Al (Broccoli)
- Mark L. Taylor as 2nd Assistant Director
- Larry Cedar as 1st Assistant Director (Soap)
- Janet Carroll as Dorothy Davis
- Sean Connery as Himself (uncredited)

== Release ==
The film premiered at the 1988 Toronto International Film Festival on September 14, 1988. It opened in limited release in the United States on September 30, 1988 before opening wide the following weekend.

== Reception ==
The movie received mixed reviews. The film gets 3.5 stars out of 4 from Roger Ebert.

=== Box office ===
The movie was not a box office success. It grossed between $3 million and $4 million at the box office on a $12 million budget.
