= The Revenge of Al Capone =

- Genre: Drama
- Written by: Tracy Keenan Wynn
- Directed by: Michael Pressman
- Starring: Keith Carradine; Ray Sharkey
- Theme music composer: Craig Safan
- Country of origin: United States
- Original language: English

Production
- Executive producers: John Levoff; Robert Lovenheim
- Producer: Vicki Niemi
- Cinematography: Tim Suhrstedt
- Editor: Jeff Freeman
- Running time: 96 minutes
- Production companies: River City Productions Inc. Unity Productions Inc.

Original release
- Network: NBC
- Release: February 26, 1989

The Revenge of Al Capone (also known as Revenge of Capone) is a 1989 American television film about Al Capone starring Keith Carradine as Michael Rourke. Ray Sharkey portrays Al Capone. Tracy Keenan Wynn wrote the script. The plot is not based on fact but rather is based on a revisionist interpretation of the 1933 attempted murder of President-elect Roosevelt by delusional anarchist Giuseppe Zangara.

== Plot ==
Following his imprisonment, Al Capone still continues to run his crime empire and plots to assassinate the mayor of Chicago, Anton Cermak.

== Cast ==
- Keith Carradine as Michael Rourke
- Ray Sharkey as Scarface
- Debrah Farentino as Jennie
- Charles Haid as Alex Connors
- Jayne Atkinson as Elizabeth
- Neil Giuntoli as Dutch Schultz
- Scott Paulin as Eliot Ness
- Alan Rosenberg as Frank Nitti
- Jordan Charney as J. Edgar Hoover
- Robert Bernedetti as Mayor Anton Cermak
- Conor O'Farrell as Sergeant Callahan
- Troy Evans as Harry Lang

== Critical response ==
Chris Willman of the Los Angeles Times wrote: "Revenge is an offer that can be refused."

Robert Bianco of The Pittsburgh Press wrote: "Luck, however, is a rare entertainment commodity. What TV's tight production schedule – and NBC's new-found affection for exploding blood capsules – gives you Sunday at 9 two hours of by-the-numbers boredom, The Revenge of Al Capone."

Tom Ensign of the Toledo Blade wrote: "I have no idea how much, if any, fact is involved in this film. Carradine is about the only bright spot."

Faye Zuckerman of TimesDaily wrote : "Both Sharkey and Carradine will keep you engaged with their fine acting in this tense movie, which is reminiscent of a gritty episode of from the 1959–63 TV series The Untouchables.

=== Ratings ===
The Revenge of Al Capone ranked 35th overall with a 13.9 share. Its competitor, Naked Life, ranked 9th overall with a 21.2 share.
