= The Most Wonderful Time of the Year (2008 film) =

2008 television film directed by Michael Scott

- DVD cover
- Written by: Bruce Graham
- Directed by: Michael Scott
- Starring: Brooke Burns; Henry Winkler; Warren Christie
- Theme music composer: Philip Giffin
- Country of origin: United States
- Original language: English

Production
- Producer: Harvey Kahn
- Cinematography: Adam Sliwinski
- Editor: Jason Pielak
- Running time: 90 minutes

Original release
- Network: Hallmark Channel
- Release: December 13, 2008

The Most Wonderful Time of the Year is a 2008 American made-for-television Christmas film directed by Michael Scott. The film premiered on Hallmark Channel on December 13, 2008.

== Plot ==
Ralph is a retired police officer who has worked as a New York cop for over 38 years. He plans on visiting his niece Jennifer in Naperville, Illinois for the holidays. Jennifer is a successful businesswoman and the single mother of her young son Brian. She grew up all her life mostly at Ralph's, as her mother was constantly traveling and her father died when she was very young. Since then, she has lost her Christmas spirit. At the airport, Ralph does not know where to go to check in for his flight, and is helped by co-traveler Morgan Derby, a 30-year-old chef with a carefree spirit. When it turns out his second flight to Denver is canceled, Ralph invites Morgan to stay at Jennifer's house.

Although Jennifer is initially reluctant to take in Morgan, Ralph convinces her to allow it since Morgan is a chef and she needs help cooking a turkey. Morgan and Jennifer soon realize that they are two completely different people. Jennifer is irritated by Morgan's careless and adventurous behavior, and Morgan feels that Jennifer is a cynical control freak, which is mostly the result of being deserted by Brian's father and dating the successful but materialistic businessman Richard Windom. Ralph, however, feels that Jennifer and Morgan are perfect for each other, and tries to prevent Jennifer from sending Morgan away.

When Jennifer takes Morgan to the airport, Morgan cannot board his flight because he doesn't have his passport. Jennifer realizes that Ralph has stolen his passport so he can stay another day. Jennifer and Morgan end up spending the entire day together and bond. Morgan is able to help Jennifer get Brian the one Christmas gift he wished for: a "Rocketwheel" bicycle. Later that night, on Christmas Eve, Morgan makes Brian believe in Santa Claus again, by climbing on the roof and pretending to be one of Santa's helpers. Meanwhile, Jennifer and Richard attend a formal party. Richard proposes to Jennifer, putting her on the spot. Nervous what to say, she accepts.

Morgan feels disappointed by the engagement and leaves at Richard's request. Richard then steals a Thank-you note Morgan left for Jennifer. Jennifer is mad when she finds out Morgan left, but softens when Ralph tells her that Morgan nearly killed himself on the roof, trying to make Brian believe in Christmas again. Jennifer finally realizes she's in love with Morgan, and breaks off the engagement with Richard after discovering he stole Morgan's note. She rushes to the airport to find him, and accidentally broadcasts her feelings over the PA system. Morgan hears her confession and rushes to find her. They reconcile and return to Jennifer's home to celebrate Christmas.

== Cast ==
- Brooke Burns as Jennifer 'Jen' Cullen
- Henry Winkler as Uncle Ralph(Kendall)
- Warren Christie as Morgan Derby
- Connor Levins as Brian Cullen
- Woody Jeffreys as Richard Windom
- Serge Houde as Stephen Windom
- Rebecca Toolan as Winnie Windom
- Michael Roberds as Chet Wojorski
- Rukiya Bernard as Denise

== Home media ==
The film was released on DVD on October 13, 2009.

== See also ==
- List of Christmas films
