= A Smoky Mountain Christmas =

- VHS cover
- Genre: Fantasy; Music
- Written by: William Bleich; Dolly Parton
- Directed by: Henry Winkler
- Starring: Dolly Parton; Lee Majors
- Theme music composer: Dana Kaproff
- Country of origin: United States
- Original language: English

Production
- Executive producer: Sandy Gallin
- Producer: Robert Lovenheim
- Cinematography: Reynaldo Villalobos
- Editor: Michael A. Stevenson
- Running time: 94 minutes
- Production company: Sandollar Productions

Original release
- Network: ABC
- Release: December 14, 1986

A Smoky Mountain Christmas is a 1986 American made-for-television musical fantasy film starring Dolly Parton and Lee Majors, directed by Henry Winkler. It was originally broadcast on ABC on December 14, 1986.

== Plot ==
Country music superstar Lorna Davis (Dolly Parton) is overwhelmed and disillusioned by her career and loneliness. She plans a trip to a friend's cabin in Tennessee's Smoky Mountains to escape from Los Angeles and recuperate during the Christmas season.

Upon arriving there, Lorna finds it has become the impromptu home of seven orphans who are hiding from the orphanage in town. They actually discover her sleeping in one of the beds (an allusion to the Seven Dwarfs finding Snow White), to which the youngest proclaims: "I know who she is. She's the Angel."

Because they both have secrets to keep - the children don't want to be found by the orphanage and Lorna doesn't want to be found by anyone from L.A. - they agree to keep each other's presence at the cabin a secret. She then quickly builds strong friendships with them, although it takes a while to win over cautious Jake, the eldest.

Little does she know, Lorna has been followed there by Harry (Dan Hedaya), a sleazy and enterprising paparazzo who is determined to reveal her hidden location. In addition to him, she faces Jezebel (Anita Morris), a mountain "witch woman" who is determined to kill her for attracting the eye of her lover, John Jensen (Bo Hopkins), the sheriff of the nearby town. She is saved from Jezebel's first attempt on her life by Mountain Dan (Lee Majors), a wandering mountain man who is wise to the ways of "mountain folk."

After Harry reveals Lorna's identity to John, she is arrested and the children are taken back to the orphanage. Jezebel, disguised as an old woman, delivers a poisoned pie to Lorna in prison, but is tricked into eating it herself and falls into an endless sleep. Lorna is freed by Jake, Dan, and Harry and they formulate a plan to free the children from the orphanage.

Dressed as Santa Claus and a helper elf, Dan and Lorna are able to get into the orphanage and free them, only to be stopped by John while trying to escape.

They are taken before extremely uninterested Judge Harold Benton (John Ritter) who eventually dismisses all charges against Lorna and Dan and grants temporary custody of the children to her.

== Selected cast ==
- Dolly Parton as Lorna Davis
- Lee Majors as Dan "Mountain Dan"
- Dan Hedaya as Harry
- Anita Morris as Jezebel
- Bo Hopkins as Sheriff John Jensen
- John Ritter as Judge Harold Benton
- Rance Howard as Dr. Jennings
- René Auberjonois as Ned
- Jean Speegle as Old Lady Jezebel
- Chad Sheets as Jake
- Danny Cooksey as Jasper
- Ashley Bank as Mary
- Gennie James as Cindy
- Daryl Bartley as Freddie
- Marc D. Robinson as "String Bean"
- Micah Rowe as Buster
- Jeanne Hepple as Matty
- Linda Hoy as Hatty
- Douglas Seale as Vernon
- Claude Earl Jones as The Bartender
- Chris Nash as Deputy Frank
- David Ackroyd as Video Director
- Carl Franklin as Lieutenant Danvers
- Marc Flanagan as Cop
- Debra Christofferson as Nurse
- Clint Parton as Clint
- Bryan Seaver as Bryan

== Production ==
Filming took place in late 1986 on location at the Great Smoky Mountains region of Tennessee with some interior scenes being filmed on sound stages in California.

== Songs ==
The movie features seven songs. They were all written by Parton except "(I'd Like to Spend) Christmas with Santa" which was written by her uncle Bill Owens. A soundtrack album for the movie was never released. In 2022, Parton included "A Smoky Mountain Christmas", "(I'd Like to Spend) Christmas with Santa", and "Wrapped Up in You" on the Ultimate Deluxe Edition of her album A Holly Dolly Christmas.

1. "Country Memories"
2. "Mountain Magic"
3. "Look on the Bright Side"
4. "(I'd Like to Spend) Christmas with Santa"
5. "Pretty Is as Pretty Does"
6. "A Smoky Mountain Christmas"
7. "Wrapped Up in You"

== Home media ==
The film was released on VHS on October 8, 1992.

== See also ==
- List of Christmas films
