= Where Has Tommy Flowers Gone? =

Where Has Tommy Flowers Gone? is a play by Terrence McNally.

== Production history ==
Where Has Tommy Flowers Gone? premiered at the Yale Repertory Theatre, New Haven, Connecticut, on January 7, 1971. Directed by Larry Arrick, the cast featured Robert Drivas as Tommy Flowers, Barbara Damashek, James Naughton and Henry Winkler. The play next was produced at the Berkshire Theatre Festival, Stockbridge, Massachusetts, on August 11, 1971.

The play opened Off-Broadway at the Eastside Playhouse on October 7, 1971 and closed on December 12 after 78 performances. It was directed by Jacques Levy and the cast featured Robert Drivas (Tommy Flowers), Kathleen Dabney (Nedda Lemon), F. Murray Abraham (The Men), Marion Paone (The Women), Wallace Rooney and Barbara Worthington. Sally Kirkland was a replacement for Kathleen Dabney. Alan Eichler was the press representative.

The play was presented at the Berkshire Theatre Festival, Stockbridge, Massachusetts in June - July 2, 2006.

== Overview ==
The play focuses on Tommy Flowers, a "social misfit", a "zany, dangerous rebel." The play takes place in the time when there were clear divisions between Youth and Age, Rules and Freedom. There is a "running commentary" about the 1960s/early 1970s "free love sexual liberation." Tommy's homosexuality eventually becomes obvious through the course of the play.

== Critical response ==
Otis L. Guernsey wrote that the play was a highlight of the Off-Broadway season, about a "30 year old child of the 1950s adrift in the stormy sea of New York in the 1970s."

Emmanuel Sampath Nelson (Professor of English at State University of New York College at Cortland) wrote that the play was a "disappointment" to many reviewers. John Simon (reviewing in The New York Times) is quoted as writing "the play is dragged out beyond any shape or structuring...there is a desperation about this kind of writing...bizarrness mistaking itself ...for an original voice." Nelson wrote that the play "continues his [McNally] exploration of power relations."

Thomas S. Hischak (Professor of Theatre State University of New York at Cortland) wrote that the play was "one of the liveliest offerings of the off-Broadway season... a breezy, frustrating, joyous ode to aimlessness by a playwright who was coming into his own."

Toby Zinman commented on the character of "Tommy": "Tommy is empty when it comes to any intelligence in dealing with life as well as any passionate respect for anything other than self-interest."
