= Fonzie (band) =

Portuguese rock band

- Origin: Lisbon, Portugal
- Genres: Pop punk, punk rock, pop rock, skate punk, alternative rock, melodic hardcore
- Years active: 1996–present
- Labels: Movieplay (Portugal), Transdreamer (US), ULF (Japan), Punk Nation / I Scream Records (Europe)
- Members: Hugo Maia; David Marques; João Marques; JB
- Past members: Carlos Teixeira; Miguel Cruz
- Website: fonzietime.com

Fonzie is a Portuguese rock band from Lisbon. The band was formed in 1996. It consisted of vocalist and guitarist Hugo Maia, guitarist David Marques, bass guitarist Carlos Teixeira, and drummer João Marques. The band was nominated for "Best Portuguese Act" at the MTV Europe Music Awards in 2003 and 2007.

The band did three world tours, playing in the US, Japan, Australia, Singapore, UK, Brazil, Germany, Portugal, Spain, France, Belgium, Italy, Netherlands, Austria, Czech Republic, Sweden, Colombia, Venezuela, Ecuador, Chile, and Argentina.

Their music was featured on major music TV channels throughout the world, such as MTV, MTV2, MTV Asia, NBC, Fuse TV, MCM, and was played on radio stations around the world. Their song "Gotta Get Away" was featured in the American MTV series "Laguna Beach" and "MTV MADE".

== History ==
=== Formation and Built to Rock (1996–2003) ===
In 1996 Hugo Maia, João Marques and David Marques decided to form a band named "Fonzie." In 1997, the promo tape "Bring Me Up" was released containing four tracks. The first EP, called The Melo Pot, was released in 1998, including 10 songs. It sold out the same year. Their debut album Built to Rock was recorded in 2001 in Sweden with producer Pelle Saether. In the same year, Fonzie won a worldwide contest sponsored by Millencolin to elect the best "Millencolin Cover Song".

In 2002 Built to Rock was released by North American publisher Jumpstart Records, followed by a contract with Portuguese Movieplay, ULF Records, Sound Records, PunkNation Records, and Godchild Records. They toured the U.S., Europe, Asia, and South America, and their videos were played in more than 20 territories on TV channels such as MTV, MCM, and Fuse.

In 2003 Fonzie was nominated for best Portuguese act at MTV Europe Music Awards.

=== Wake Up Call (2004–2005) ===
In 2003 the band's second album, Wake Up Call, was produced by P.O. Saether. Wake Up Call featured Nicola Sarcevic of Millencolin, Mats Olson, Agneta Olund, Jeremy Miers, and Dj Alex (Tokyo) as special guests. The video for the first single, "Gotta Get Away", was filmed in Hollywood (LA) and was directed by Darren Doane (Deftones, Blink 182, Jimmy Eat World, etc.).

Fonzie signed a contract with Megaforce Records for two albums. In 2004 and 2005, they toured the U.S., Asia, Europe, South America, and Australia for the first time, with 18 dates as headliners, of which twelve sold out.

=== Tenth anniversary and Shout It Out (2006–2008) ===
The years 2006 and 2008 marked the 10th anniversary of Fonzie's run, celebrated with the recording of a Shout It Out, produced by Fonzie and Fred Stone. The release of Shout It Out was followed by another world tour of the U.S., South America, Europe, Asia, and Australia, and Fonzie was again nominated for best Portuguese act at the MTV Europe Music Awards.

=== Angry Odd Kids and Caminho (2009–present) ===
Bassist Carlos Teixeira formed a side project in 2003, a Portuguese punk rock band called Angry Odd Kids (aka A.O.K), playing the guitar and backing vocals. Because some members left the band and had to be replaced, their debut album AOK was not released until 2009; it was produced by AOK and Fred Stone.

After the album was released, Fonzie returned to the studio to record a new album. In January 2009, the first single, "A Tua Imagem" ("Your Image" in English), was released on YouTube. In 2010, their first album sung entirely in Portuguese, Caminho ("Path" in English), was released, along with an eponymous single. After they finished touring, Teixeira left to work on his side project "Avenida Zero" and was replaced by JB on bass. In April 2013, their single "Renascer" ("Reborn") debuted on YouTube.

== Band members ==
Current

- Hugo Maia – lead vocals, guitar
- David Marques – lead guitar
- João Marques – drums, percussion
- JB (bass) – bass guitar, backing vocals

Former

- Jorge Gregos – bass guitar
- Miguel Marques – bass guitar, backing vocals
- Carlos Teixeira bass guitar, backing vocals

== Discography ==
Studio albums

- Built to Rock (2001)
- Wake Up Call (2003)
- Shout It Out (2007)
- Caminho (2010)

Extended plays

- Bring Me Up (1997)
- The Melo Pot (1998)
- 96 (2019)
