= Fonzie =

Sitcom character

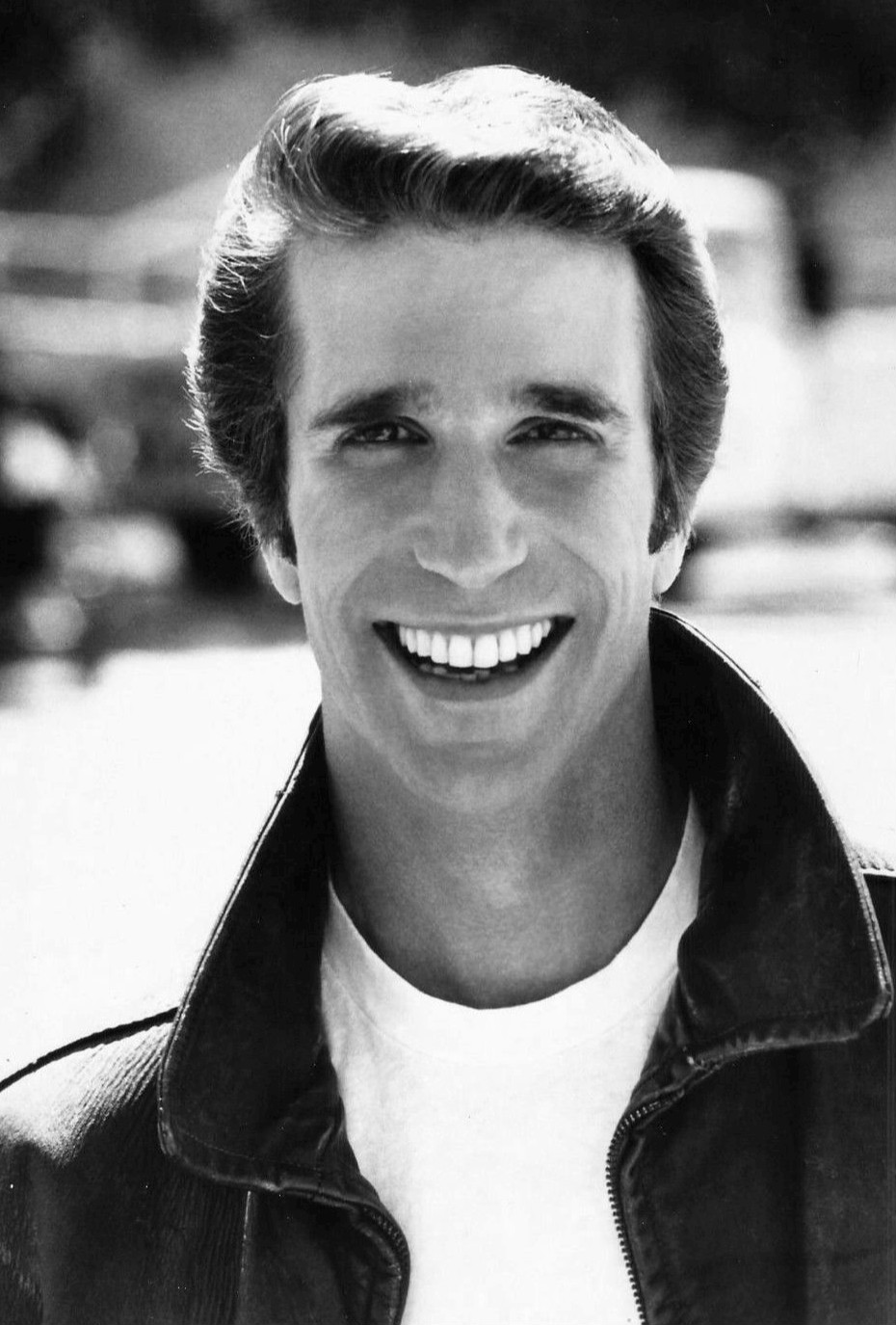
- Winkler as Fonzie in 1977
- First appearance: "All the Way" (1974)
- Last appearance: "Ron Howard’s Call to Action" (2008)
- Portrayed by: Henry Winkler

In-universe information
- Aliases: "Fonzie" "The Fonz"
- Occupation: Mechanic, co-owner of Arnold's Drive-In, high school teacher
- Affiliation: Republican
- Family: Vito Fonzarelli (father, deceased); Angela Fonzarelli (mother); Arthur 'Artie' Fonzarelli (half-brother)
- Children: Danny Corrigan Jr. (adoptive son)
- Relatives: Grandma Nussbaum (grandmother); Louisa Delvecchio (aunt); Spike Fonzarelli (nephew); Chachi Arcola (cousin)
- Nationality: Italian-American

Arthur Herbert Fonzarelli, better known as "Fonzie" or "The Fonz", is a fictional character played by Henry Winkler in the American sitcom Happy Days (1974–1984), created by Garry Marshall. He was originally a secondary character, but was soon positioned as a lead character when he began surpassing the other characters in popularity. The Fonzie character was so popular that in the second season producers considered renaming the show to "Fonzie's Happy Days." Fonzie was seen by many as the epitome of coolness and a sex symbol.

Happy Days producer and writer Bob Brunner created both Arthur Fonzarelli's "Fonzie" nickname, and the invented put-down, "Sit on it". The character was a stereotypical greaser who was frequently seen on his motorcycle, wore a leather jacket, and typified the essence of cool, in contrast to his circle of friends.

On November 8, 1980, Hanna-Barbera Productions and Paramount Television produced the ABC Saturday morning The Fonz and the Happy Days Gang animated series during the Saturday morning schedule on ABC.

Fonzie is one of only two characters (along with Howard Cunningham) to appear in all 255 episodes of the series.

== Character traits and development ==
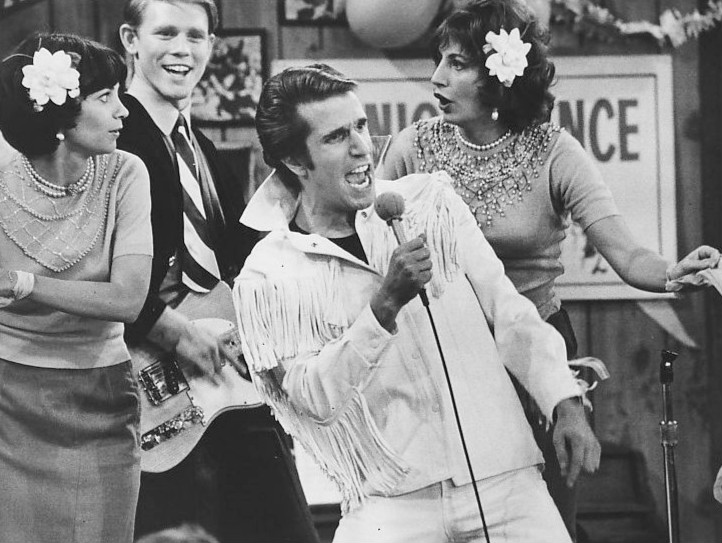
The Fonz becomes a singing superstar. Pictured are Cindy Williams as Shirley Feeney, Ron Howard as Richie Cunningham, Henry Winkler as Fonzie, and Penny Marshall as Laverne DeFazio.

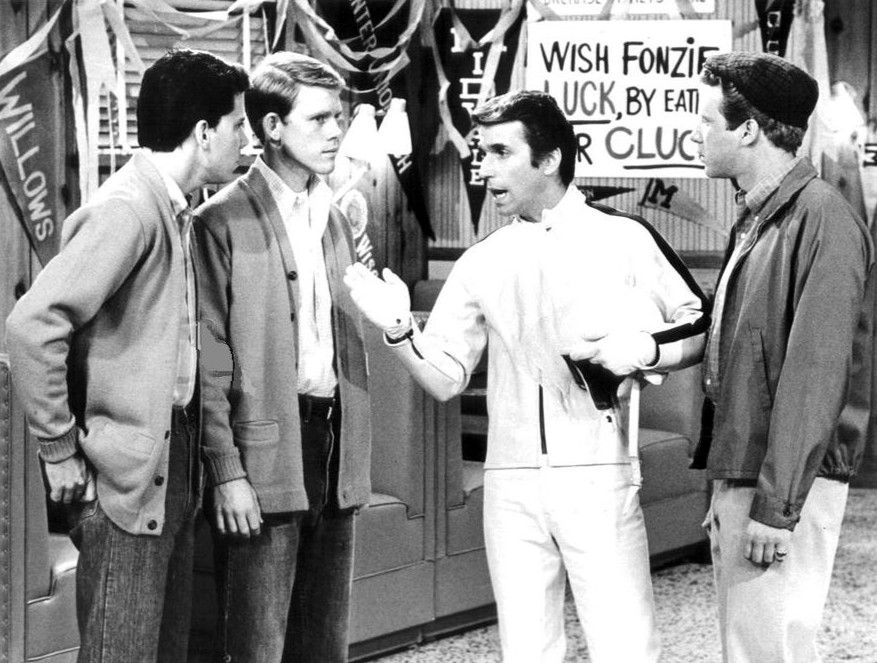
Potsie (Anson Williams), Richie (Ron Howard), Fonzie (Henry Winkler) and Ralph Malph (Donny Most) at Arnold's drive-in. [this picture features spelling citation for FONZIE on the sign / placard

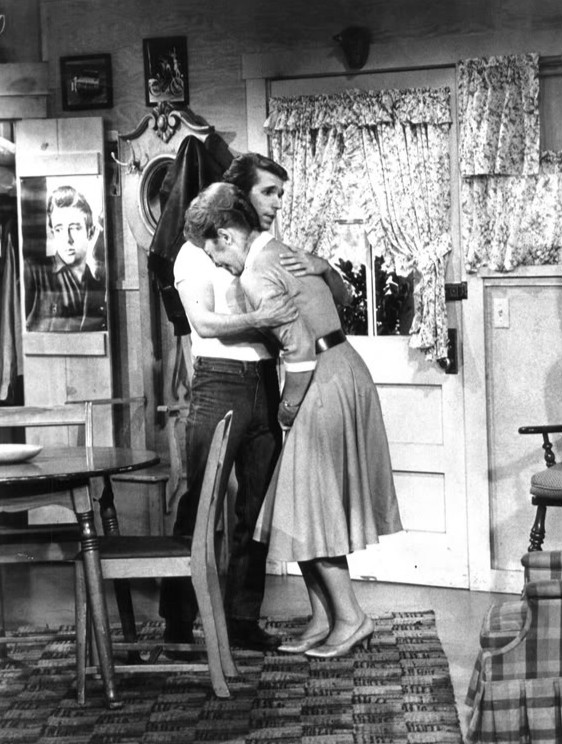
Marion (Marion Ross) feels life has passed her by; her children are growing up and she feels like she is not needed. Mrs. C turns to Fonzie (Henry Winkler), whose apartment is above the Cunningham's garage, for a sympathetic ear.

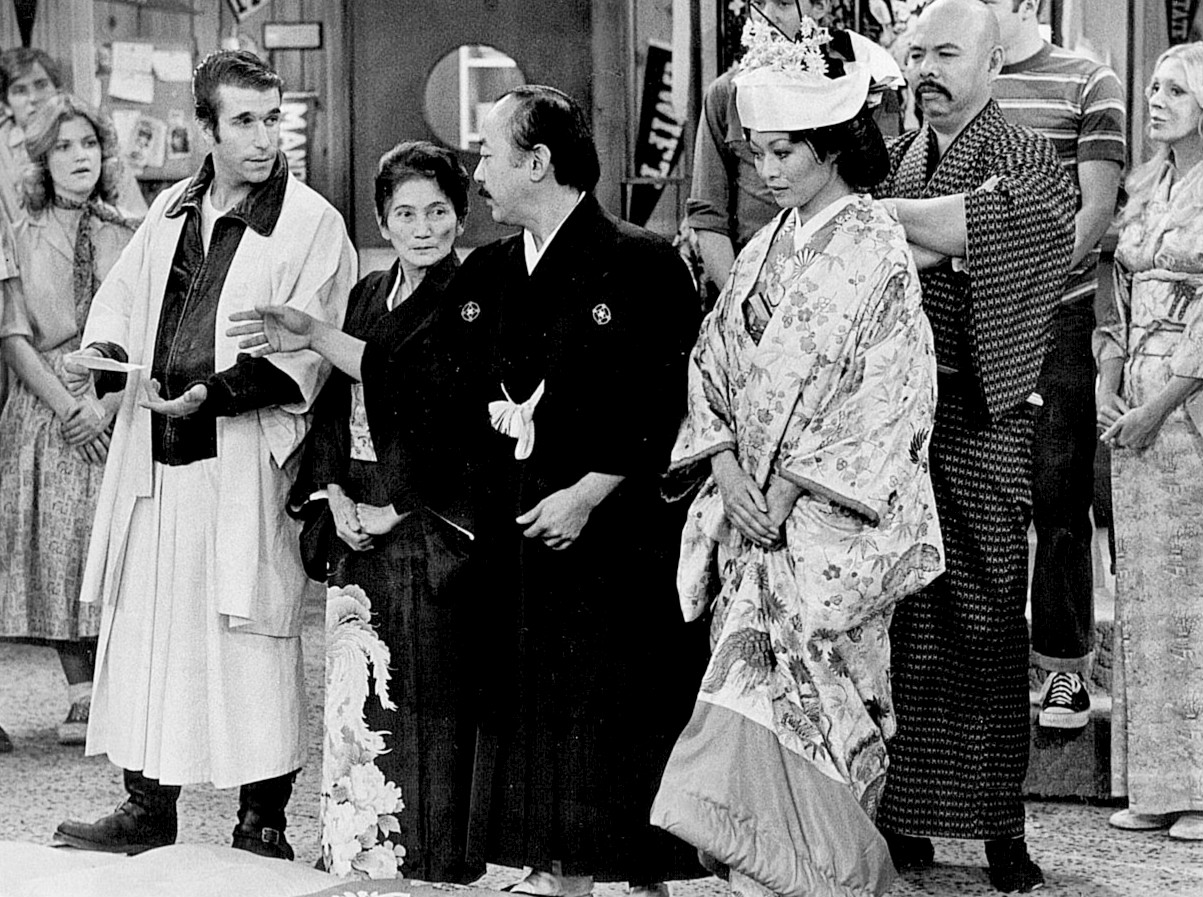
Arnold's wedding from Happy Days. Arnold, the original owner of Arnold's drive-in (Pat Morita), asks Fonzie to be his best man at his traditional Japanese wedding ceremony.

Arthur Fonzarelli was born to an Italian-American family. He and his mother were abandoned by his father when Arthur was three, and Arthur holds few memories of him, but deep resentment toward him for the abandonment. In the season 6 episode "Christmas Time", a sailor delivers a Christmas present ostensibly from his father (played by Eddie Fontaine). Fonzie is resentful, but at the end of the episode he opens his father's letter explaining why he left and reads it. He also learns that the sailor was his father, who admits in the letter that he doubted he would have the courage to reveal the truth to his son. Fonzie only relents when Howard Cunningham agrees with Fonzie that his father was irresponsible and in the wrong. In a later episode, Fonzie unexpectedly meets a woman he believes is his mother in a diner. She convinces him she is not, but in the end, she looks at a picture of Fonzie she had in her possession. In the final season, Fonzie meets his half-brother 'Arte' Fonzarelli, who informs him that their father has by then died. Fonzie has mixed emotions upon hearing this, as this left so many questions about his past unanswered, but Fonzie bonded with Arte, who helped him cope.

Grandma Nussbaum appears to have been a primary caregiver to Fonzie since the age of six. When he (instead of Grandma Nussbaum) moves into the Cunninghams' garage apartment—a plot development that helped precipitate his increased presence in the series—he turns his old apartment over to his grandmother. Grandma Nussbaum (and she alone) calls Fonzie "Skippy". She is also the grandmother of Fonzie's cousin Chachi Arcola (played by Scott Baio).

Fonzie's devotion to her foreshadows his ongoing devotion to mother figures throughout the show, particularly to Marion Cunningham, whom Fonzie affectionately calls "Mrs. C." Though at first looked down on and mistrusted (a result of his past and being a high school dropout), he eventually became accepted by the Cunninghams (his friend Richie's family), even more so after he rented an attic room over their garage. Even Richie's father, Howard ("Mr. C." to Fonzie and the most resistant to him living with them), a pillar of the community, came to regard Fonzie with affection and said "Ayyyy" when Fonzie moved into the garage.

Fonzie shares a very close relationship with his younger cousin Chachi, and his nephew Spike. Fonzie was able to be the older brother figure that Chachi needed in his life. In having Chachi come to live and work with him, Fonzie grows too, becoming an overall better, more responsible and caring person. Fonzie serves as Chachi's best man when he marries Joanie. In the long shot at the end of Chachi and Joanie's wedding, Fonzie is the first person who comes to congratulate his younger cousin. He and Chachi embrace for several seconds. They share another hug at the end of Mr. C's toast. These are just a couple examples of Fonzie and Chachi's relationship. The last couple of seasons show how close Fonzie and Chachi really grew to be.

Fonzie also encourages Spike to follow his dreams, regardless of how they may be perceived by others. Spike confesses to Fonzie his ambitions to own a "flower store", but is reluctant to make it known out of fear that it will ruin his self-perceived image of cool. Using himself as an example, Fonzie tells Spike to not let others dictate his path in life, to follow his own instincts and take responsibility for his own happiness.

== Civic involvement ==
Fonzie was involved in community projects. He endorses Republican Dwight D. Eisenhower's 1956 presidential campaign. At a rally Fonzie declares, "Ayyy, he won the war, didn't he!?" and "I like Ike! My bike likes Ike! Ayyy..." Eisenhower carried Wisconsin with 62% of the vote, easily defeating Adlai Stevenson (supported by Richie Cunningham's more-researched speech). In that election, Eisenhower got 457 electoral votes to 73 for Stevenson.

Fonzie becomes involved with other issues. Highlighting actor Henry Winkler's off-camera work, several episodes dealt with civil rights of people with disabilities. Concerned that students with epilepsy were denied their chance to attend public school and play sports, he intervenes to resolve the issue; he also learns sign language to communicate with a woman working at the municipal power company. And he pushes Chachi to continue working with his disability when Chachi himself just wants to quit because things will be hard. Such advocacy builds on the previous season's episode where Fonzie hired wheelchair-using Don King to work in his garage, promising to provide workplace accommodation for his employee.

Concerned about equal opportunity, Fonz wants Milwaukee racially integrated. Personally friends with African Americans, he becomes upset when a party in which Richie welcomes Hawaii into the Union is boycotted because it will be racially integrated. Initially wanting to force people to attend, Fonzie learns from Howard that people cannot be forced to change their minds overnight. In a later episode, Fonzie volunteers to go south with Al and a group of Freedom Riders to help integrate a segregated diner. Normally flirtatious with women, Fonzie is instead disgusted that the waitress does not serve black customers. At one point he tells her that he cannot date her because of her compliance with the diner policy. Another episode that dealt with racial issues was where Fonzie was a juror in a trial of a black biker accused of robbery. The episode dealt with circumstantial evidence and jury nullification. Mr. Cunningham, who was on the same jury, went to bat for Fonzie, saying all jurors are permitted to present arguments and he took it very seriously about taking a man's freedom away, which he refused to do without proof of guilt. The episode was based on Twelve Angry Men. Fonzie was able to get the black biker acquitted, explaining that his English-made Triumph Grand Mark 2 had its accelerators on the left handlebar. The robber had snatched the purse of the woman with his left hand. Therefore, there is no way that the black biker could have sped off on his bike if the purse was in his left hand.

Fonzie also becomes involved with the Big Brother (later known a Big Brothers, Big Sisters) program. After spending some time with his "Little Brother" Danny, Fonzie decides to adopt him. While Fonzie is by this time a respected and responsible pillar of the community, the adoption process hits a snag when the adoption agency denies his application due to his marital status. Devastated, Fonzie's first instincts are to take Danny and run, but then realizes that doing so would only prove the agency right. He reluctantly returns Danny to the agency. On the day of Joanie and Chachi's wedding, the agency surprises Fonzie by returning Danny to him, introducing Danny as his "son", with Danny calling the joyous Fonzie "Dad" for the first time.

== Production and legacy ==
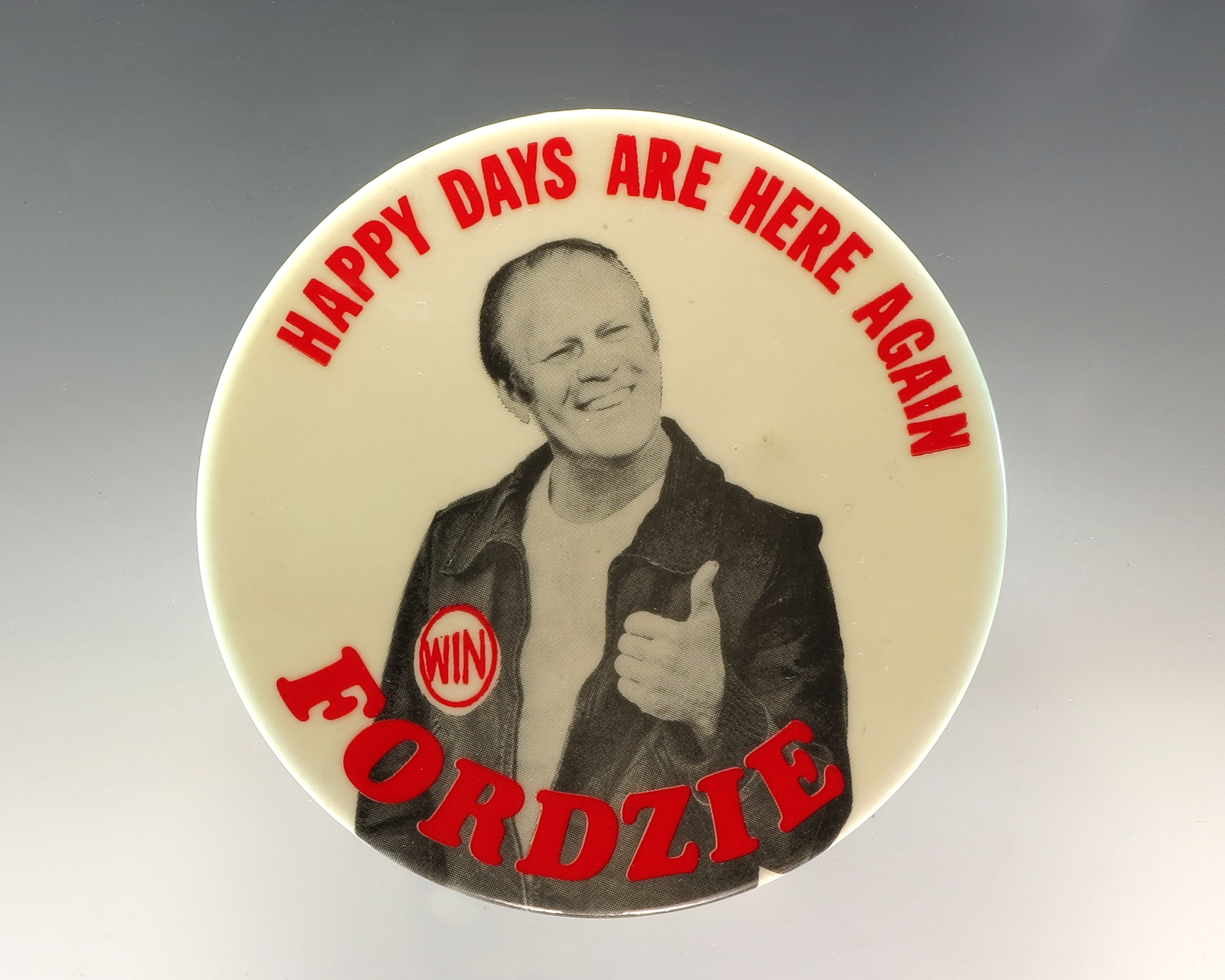
A campaign button for Gerald Ford's 1976 presidential campaign

Micky Dolenz auditioned and was in the running to portray the Fonz, whom the show creators envisioned as blonde Hollywood idol type. The part ultimately went to Henry Winkler who pitched a different vision. In the first season Fonz usually appeared in a green windbreaker jacket rather than the black leather jacket that the writers wanted, which ABC producers saw as suggestive of criminality. The writers negotiated an exception for scenes where Fonz appeared with his motorcycle, then proceeded to feature the motorcycle in all of his scenes, even indoors, until ABC relented.

Winkler received three Primetime Emmy nominations and two Golden Globe awards for his portrayal of Fonzie. In addition, the National Museum of American History, Smithsonian Institution asked him to donate one of Fonzie's leather jackets in 1980. The Smithsonian curator Eric Jentsch added the following to the jacket description: "Fonzie was a representation of cool at a time when you were learning about what cool was." Years later, NPR would make a similar assessment, stating that for "kids growing up in the 1970s, there was one, absolute model of cool — not James Dean or Marlon Brando, but The Fonz." In 1999 TV Guide ranked Fonzie as number 4 on its 50 Greatest TV Characters of All Time list. In a 2001 poll conducted by Channel 4 in the UK, the Fonz was ranked 13th on their list of the 100 Greatest TV Characters. A few decades later, American artist Gerald P. Sawyer, unveiled the Bronze Fonz (a public artwork) on the Milwaukee Riverwalk in downtown Milwaukee, Wisconsin, on August 18, 2008. In 2021, when asked which books influenced him in childhood, American journalist Anderson Cooper (who is also dyslexic) responded that, "I also loved the Fonz and read a book when I was around 8 called The Fonz: The Henry Winkler Story. I actually keep it in my office at CNN. Henry Winkler was very important to me when I was a child. Meeting him as an adult — and discovering what a kind and gracious person he is — was amazing."

Winkler feared being typecast as a greaser after playing Fonzie (and for his previous role as a greaser in The Lords of Flatbush before Happy Days); to avoid this, he turned down the role of Danny Zuko in Grease. He had difficulty finding work in the 1980s after Happy Days ended because of the popularity of the Fonzie role; he would work mainly behind the camera in the 1980s, most notably as the Executive Producer of the popular adventure TV series, MacGyver, and eventually begin getting other roles in the 1990s, prompting a career rejuvenation.

=== In popular culture ===
- "The Fonz Dance" (Happy Days, Season 4, Episode 8) refers to Winkler improvising a version of the hora as Richie's band plays the song Hava Nagila. Years later in 2018, Winkler performed a version of the dance as a guest on The Tonight Show Starring Jimmy Fallon.
- In season 5 of the sitcom Friends, the doctor who delivers Phoebe's triplets is a fan of Fonzie, which annoys her.
- In the 1994 film Pulp Fiction the character Jules (Samuel L. Jackson) calms would-be robber "Honey Bunny" (Amanda Plummer) by instructing her to "Be like Fonzie" ("That's right, we're all gonna be cool!")
- 2019 it was reported that Dominic Cummings, special political adviser to British Prime Minister Boris Johnson, paraphrased Jules by telling Conservative MPs to "be cool like Fonzies" as political pressure built to request an extension to the date of the UK's withdrawal from the European Union.
- In the 2015 sci-fi film The Martian, the character Mark Watney poses as the Fonz for his first official "proof of life" picture.
- Jon Hein developed the phrase "jumping the shark" in response to Season Five, Episode 3, "Hollywood: Part 3" of the sitcom Happy Days, in which Fonzie jumps over a shark while on water-skis.
- Fonzie had the ability of hitting electrical equipment to make it work, and this became known as the Fonzarelli Fix, a term that is still in use today.
- A garage apartment is sometimes called a Fonzie flat.
- The 2016 single "Lemon" by N.E.R.D. featuring Rihanna, has the line in Rihanna's verse, "Waiting for my thumb like The Fonz" as a reference to Fonzie's trademark thumbs up.
- Fonzie was featured in a poster at the ending segment of Season 13, Episode 13 of Last Week Tonight with John Oliver, which talked about Ghanaian film posters. The poster was used for the FYC Emmy campaign and as part of a charity initiative to support Ghanaian artists and charities. In the poster, Fonzie was seen holding a pickaxe with his signature thumbs up while in a chaotic scene featuring Oliver, Rachel Dratch (as Wanda Jo), explosions, dismembered body parts and other characters from previous episodes. Fonzie was selected by the artist to fulfil the requirement of having a character be from outside the show.
- In the Canadian mockumentary Trailer Park Boys, park troublemaker and reoccurring character Cyrus is often referred to as “Gay Fonzie.”

== See also ==
- Bronze Fonz
- Fonzie (band) – Punk rock band from Portugal
- Fonz (video game)
- List of breakout characters
