= Linda Hoy =

British author

Linda Hoy is a British author who is best known for her works for children and young adults.

Her first novel, Your Friend, Rebecca, was published in 1981. It is now a set text in many British comprehensive schools, and is often used to help young people deal with bereavement.

Another novel, Haddock 'n' Chips, was the winner of the 1994 Children's Book Award. A novel based on the fortunes of Sheffield United football team, United on Vacation, was shortlisted for the same award in 1995. Her first television play, Emily, was the winner of the Silver Award for Drama in New York in 1985. She received a Writers' Award for New Writing from the Arts Council in 1999.

She was a Fellow at York St John University between 2004 and 2007, and a Fellow at the University of Sheffield between 2007 and 2010. She has taught creative writing at Sheffield Hallam University and regularly leads writing workshops in schools and universities. Her daughter is a US-based academic and writer Mikita Brottman.

A new non-fiction work, The Effect was published on 28 September 2012. Exploring the connections between time, spirituality and quantum physics, it claims to "offer the strongest evidence yet for the existence of a soul and an afterlife".

She lives in Sheffield, UK, and is represented by the Robert Dudley literary agency.

== Books ==
- Your Friend, Rebecca, The Bodley Head, 1981
- The Damned, The Bodley Head, 1983
- Emmeline Pankhurst (Biography), Hamish Hamilton, 1985
- The Alternative Assembly-Book, Longmans, 1985
- Poems for Peace (Ed.), Pluto, 1986
- Nightmare Park, HarperCollins (Armada), 1987
- Kiss, Walker Paperbacks, 1989
- Ring of Death, HarperCollins (Armada), 1990
- Haddock 'n' Chips, Walker, 1993
- United on Vacation, Walker, 1994
- The Pit, Ginn & Co, 1995
- Nightmare Express, HarperCollins, 1996
- The Oracle, Ginn & Co, 1997
- Dear Poltergeist, Walker Paperbacks, 2000
- The Effect, O Books, 2012

== Sources ==
- Royal Literary Fund - Linda Hoy
- The Effect at O-Books
- The Effect website
