= Bronze Fonz =

Statue of the character Fonz from the TV Show Happy Days

- Artist: Gerald P. Sawyer
- Year: 2008
- Dimensions: (5.6 feet (1.7 m) in)
- Location: Milwaukee; 43°2′25.35″N 87°54′39.56″W
- Owner: Visit Milwaukee

The Bronze Fonz is a public artwork by American artist Gerald P. Sawyer, located on the Milwaukee Riverwalk in downtown Milwaukee, Wisconsin. The Bronze Fonz depicts Henry Winkler as "The Fonz", a character in the 1970s television series Happy Days, which was set in Milwaukee.

== Description ==
The sculpture, made of bronze, depicts actor Henry Winkler as he appeared in his role as Arthur Fonzarelli (more commonly known as "Fonzie" or "The Fonz"). Fonzarelli was an iconic character in the 1970s television show Happy Days, a sitcom about a family in 1950s–1960s Milwaukee. He stands in his usual attire: a leather jacket, white T-shirt, and jeans, and gives a two-handed thumbs up gesture, as he often did in Happy Days.

The statue is located on the Milwaukee Riverwalk, just south of Wells Street. It is accompanied by an inscription that lists donors who contributed to the Bronze Fonz project.

The organization "Visit Milwaukee" raised $75,000 to commission the sculpture and since 2008 it has been on the Milwaukee Riverwalk.

== History ==
=== Acquisition ===
The Bronze Fonz was commissioned by Visit Milwaukee, a non-profit group with the purpose of promoting tourism and bringing new businesses to Milwaukee. Visit Milwaukee raised $85,000 to commission the statue. Over the decade prior to the statue's creation, other similar television character based bronze statues, commissioned by the cable television channel, TV Land, had been built in other cities and towns to portray such figures as Mary Tyler Moore (as Mary Richards from The Mary Tyler Moore Show) in Minneapolis, Andy Griffith and Ron Howard (as Andy and Opie Taylor from The Andy Griffith Show) in Raleigh, and Jackie Gleason (as Ralph Kramden from The Honeymooners) outside the Port Authority Bus Terminal in Manhattan. However, TV Land scrapped its plans to build a Fonz statue after a change in their marketing strategy in 2007.

The sculpture was unveiled on August 18, 2008. Most of the Happy Days cast, including Winkler, Marion Ross, Tom Bosley, Erin Moran, Don Most, and Anson Williams, attended the dedication ceremony. Winkler referred to the statue as "unbelievable."

=== Opposition ===
Mike Brenner, then a local gallery owner and executive director of Milwaukee Artist Resource Network (MARN), objected to the statue, which was originally planned to be located at the intersection of Wisconsin and Water Streets, a prominent downtown site. He threatened to close his gallery and resign his position in MARN if "that stupid Fonzie sculpture" was erected there. Brenner received death threats for speaking out against the Bronze Fonz, and reposted several on his web site. The CEO of the Milwaukee Art Museum, David Gordon, along with Milwaukee Journal Sentinel arts critic Mary-Louise Schumacher and other Milwaukee arts dignitaries, also opposed the statue, which ultimately was erected instead at the Riverwalk site. Brenner nevertheless closed his gallery in May 2008, and opened a Milwaukee microbrewery.

== Maintenance ==
The sculpture was removed for maintenance in February 2022. The sculpture has become shiny on the surfaces people have been touching. The weather has also damaged the finish on the sculpture. The bronze has begun to oxidize where salt has interacted with the metal. The sculpture encourages interaction and selfies: visitors have been climbing on it, leaving scratches.

== In popular culture ==
- The statue is referenced in the lyrics of the 2014 song "Milwaukee" by The Both. The song, which recounted the local origin of the collaboration between the duo of Aimee Mann and Ted Leo, was the first single from their self-titled debut album.
- In the 2015 novel In the Drink by Allyson K. Abbott, part of a cozy mystery series set in Milwaukee, the body of a murder victim is found underneath the Bronze Fonz statue.
