= Heroes (1977 film) =

1977 film directed by Jeremy Kagan

- Theatrical release poster
- Directed by: Jeremy Paul Kagan
- Written by: James Carabatsos
- Produced by: David Foster; Lawrence Turman
- Starring: Henry Winkler; Sally Field; Harrison Ford; Val Avery
- Cinematography: Frank Stanley
- Edited by: Patrick Kennedy
- Music by: Jack Nitzsche
- Distributed by: Universal Pictures
- Release date: November 4, 1977
- Running time: 112 minutes
- Country: United States
- Language: English
- Budget: $3.1 million
- Box office: $33.5 million

Heroes is a 1977 American drama film directed by Jeremy Paul Kagan and starring Henry Winkler, Sally Field and Harrison Ford (in his first post–Star Wars role, but filmed before that movie's release).

Winkler plays a Vietnam War vet with PTSD who sets about finding the men from his unit who had served in Vietnam. Field plays his at-first-reluctant girlfriend and Ford plays one of the former soldiers in his unit, now a dysfunctional stock car driver in Sedalia, Missouri, who keeps a stolen M16 rifle in the trunk of his car.

== Plot ==
Jack Dunne, an amnesiac Vietnam veteran most likely suffering from a severe case of PTSD, escapes a V.A. mental ward in New York City intent on starting a business as a worm farmer in Eureka, California.

At the city bus station, he accidentally meets Carol Bell, a woman unsure of her engagement to a man toward whom she has confused feelings. Initially annoyed by Jack's wild, disruptive antics on the bus and at a diner, Carol gradually warms to him as they set off on a trip through middle America towards Northern California. During the journey she has time to reflect on her impending wedding, as Jack tries to locate his three war buddies hoping to enlist them in his dream to start a worm farm.

Jack and Carol visit Ken Boyd, a soldier who served with Jack and races stock cars. Jack finds that Boyd's venture raising rabbits (to use rabbit waste for worm farming) is essentially incomplete. Jack ends up racing his stock car and coming in third place at a local race. Boyd then gives the car to Jack and Carol to continue their trip. Continuing on, the couple checks into a motel where Jack is robbed outside a bar. After recovering the stolen money in a bar fight, Carol rescues Jack by crashing into the bar. Fleeing the scene, Jack and Carol eventually end up at the suburban home of Army buddy Adcox. There they find Adcox's wife living with her family and Adcox not home but “drifting”. The couple continues to Eureka after a traffic stop by police apparently for driving the damaged car from the bar crash. Having abandoned their car at a repair shop, they hitchhike on to California. When a visit to the parents of the third (Monroe) results in the disclosure that the friend had died in the war, Jack, who knew as much but was in denial, relives the battlefield trauma of Monroe's death on Eureka's streets, which morphs into the battle in Vietnam. Finally, Carol's compassion and caring enable Jack to come to terms with reality.

== Cast ==
- Henry Winkler as Jack Dunne
- Sally Field as Carol Bell
- Harrison Ford as Ken Boyd
- Val Avery as Mel, the bus driver
- Olivia Cole as Jane Adcox
- Hector Elias as Dr. Elias
- Dennis Burkley as Gus
- Tony Burton as Chef
- Michael Cavanaugh as Peanuts
- Stuart Margolin (uncredited) Station Wagon Driver
- Rance Howard as Veterans Hospital Orderly
- John Cassavetes (uncredited) as VA Doctor

== Production ==
The film was based on an original autobiographical script by James Carabatsos, a Vietnam veteran who also wrote such military-themed films as Heartbreak Ridge and Hamburger Hill. He sent it to the agent of Henry Winkler, then hugely popular because of Happy Days. Winkler loved the script and showed it to two producers, Lawrence Turman and David Foster, who wanted to work with him. They presented it as a package to Ned Tanen at Universal who agreed to finance the movie. David Freeman did a rewrite of the film which was shot over 35 days.

== Reception ==
The film was difficult to sell owing to its subject matter and the fact Winkler was playing a character so different from the Fonz.

=== Critical response ===
On Rotten Tomatoes, Heroes holds a rating of 27% from 15 reviews. On Metacritic the film has a weighted average score of 35 out of 100, based on 7 critics, indicating "generally unfavorable" reviews.

When the movie was released on VHS/DVD, the ending song, "Carry On Wayward Son" by Kansas - their first Top 20 hit - was replaced by a generic rock ballad, as the rights to the song had not been obtained. This greatly diminished the emotional impact of the final scene. However, most TV airings still contain the original soundtrack, and, in fact, the inclusion of the Kansas song has allowed "Carry On Wayward Son" to remain popular since its release, being certified Gold in 1990, and frequently still heard on the radio.

=== Box office ===
The movie was a box office success, grossing $33.5 million on a $3.1 million budget, and opened at number 1 at the U.S. box office.

=== Accolades ===
Henry Winkler received a Golden Globe award nomination for Best Actor in a Drama film. He also received the corresponding BAFTA nomination. It received another BAFTA nomination, for Best Musical Score.
