= Gimpel the Fool =

Book by Isaac Bashevis Singer

- Short story by Isaac Bashevis Singer
- First edition cover
- Translator: Saul Bellow

Publication
- Publisher: Noonday Press
- Publication date: 1957

"Gimpel the Fool" (1953) is a short story by Isaac Bashevis Singer, translated into English by Saul Bellow in 1953. It tells the story of Gimpel, a simple bread maker who is the butt of many of his town's jokes. It also gives its name to the collection first published in 1957. David Roskies has put forward the view that the story constitutes a modernist revision of a story by Nachman of Bratslav.

== Collection ==
The 1957 collection under this title contains the following stories:

- Gimpel the Fool
- The Gentleman from Cracow
- The Wife Killer
- By the Light of Memorial Candles
- The Mirror
- The Little Shoemakers - Tells the tale of a long line of modest shoemakers in Frampol. Focusing on one age in the line, this story tells the tale of Abba's 7 sons leaving the homeland and emigrating to America in a dynamic time.
- Joy
- From the Diary of One Not Born
- The Old Man
- Fire
- The Unseen - About desires and how far a person is willing to go to get what they desire, even at the expense of others they care about.

== Characters ==
Elka

Elka, who is known as the town prostitute, marries Gimpel when he agrees to get the town to take up a collection to raise a dowry for her. She is five months pregnant by another man when they are married, but she tells Gimpel the child is his and, when it arrives four months after their marriage, that it is simply premature. Throughout the story Elka commits numerous infidelities and eventually has six children, none of whom are Gimpel's. On her deathbed she admits her infidelities to her husband and asks him to forgive her.

The Spirit of Evil

The devil appears to Gimpel the baker and tells him to urinate in the bread intended for the village in order to get revenge for the many injustices the villagers have forced him to endure over the years. He does so, but is scolded by the spirit of his deceased wife. He destroys the tainted bread and becomes a homeless wanderer; at night he talks with the spirit of Elka.
