= Bischoff Hervey Entertainment =

American media company

Bischoff Hervey Entertainment Television LLC
- Industry: Entertainment
- Founded: 2003; 23 years ago
- Defunct: February 19, 2019; 7 years ago
- Headquarters: Los Angeles, California
- Key people: Eric Bischoff; Jason Hervey

Bischoff Hervey Entertainment Television LLC, simply known as Bischoff Hervey Entertainment (BHE), was an American production company, founded in 2003 by Eric Bischoff and Jason Hervey and based in Los Angeles. The company produced and broadcast various forms of television entertainment, including reality and game shows. Their first show was I Want To Be a Hilton. In addition, the company was involved in producing mobile games.

== History ==
BHE TV produced a live Girls Gone Wild pay-per-view event from Florida in 2003 with WWE and another pay-per-view about the Sturgis Motorcycle Rally in 2004. They also executive produced the VH1 reality shows I Want To Be a Hilton, Scott Baio Is 45...and Single, Scott Baio Is 46...and Pregnant, and Confessions of a Teen Idol. BHE TV was also credited on CMT shows Billy Ray Cyrus...Home At Last and Outlaw Country. BHE TV also produced a professional wrestling reality show called Hulk Hogan's Celebrity Championship Wrestling in which ten celebrities were trained to wrestle and one celebrity is voted off weekly. In January 2013, Bischoff and Hervey produced the television series Hardcore Pawn: Chicago.

In 2006 BHE and Socko Energy Drinks signed a multi-year promotional deal with World Wrestling Entertainment. The following year, BHE and Socko announced a deal with Wal-Mart to carry a Hulk Hogan branded energy drink.

In 2011, BHE was filming a show called Miami's Finest: Special Operations Section, which caught on film the Miami Police Department's killing of a suspect.

In 2012, BHE TV acquired a 50% ownership stake in games-development company MX Digital founded by Ike McFadden.

In 2012, BHE entered into a consulting agreement with Total Nonstop Action Wrestling (TNA). The agreement continued until 2019, when TNA was accused of breaching the contract.

== Shows ==
- I Want To Be a Hilton
- Scott Baio Is 45...and Single
- Scott Baio Is 46...and Pregnant
- Confessions of a Teen Idol
- Billy Ray Cyrus...Home At Last
- Outlaw Country
- Hulk Hogan's Celebrity Championship Wrestling
- Hulk Hogan's Micro Championship Wrestling
- Hardcore Pawn: Chicago
- See Dad Run
- The Devils Ride
- The Catalina
- Beverly Hills Fabulous
- Wrestling with Death
- Dope Man
- Rouge Society
- Posse: The Young Guns of PBR
- I Heart Nick Carter
- Big Easy Brides
- Bear Swamp Recovery
- Lay it Down with Cee Lo Green
- Finding Hulk Hogan
- Party Monsters Cabo

== Movies ==
- The Butler's in Love
