= The Devils Ride =

- Genre: Reality
- Country of origin: United States
- Original language: english
- No. of seasons: 3
- No. of episodes: 20

Production
- Executive producer: Jason Hervey
- Running time: 42 minutes
- Production company: Bischoff-Hervey Entertainment

Original release
- Network: Discovery Channel
- Release: May 8, 2012 – March 10, 2014

The Devils Ride was a TV show centered on a fictional motorcycle riders' club based in San Diego, California that split into two groups because of tensions between its members. It aired on the Discovery Channel and premiered on May 8, 2012. Season 2 premiered on February 18, 2013. Season 3 premiered on February 4, 2014. After season 2, members of Laffing Devils split from the club and created the new rival Sinister Mob motorcycle club. Season 2 documented the turmoil within the Laffing Devils. Eventually the Laffing Devils and Sinister Mob butt heads and a biker war ensues.

== Series overview ==
Season	Episodes	Originally released	
Season	Episodes	First released	Last released
1	6	May 8, 2012	June 12, 2012
2	8	February 18, 2013	April 8, 2013
3	6	February 3, 2014	March 10, 2014

== Episodes ==
=== Season 1 (2012) ===
No. overall	No. in season	Title	Original release date	US viewers (millions)
1	1	"The Brotherhood"	May 8, 2012	1.515
With the Laffing Devils' membership expanding exponentially and a growing divide between young and old members weighing heaving on his mind, Prez Gipsy calls a surprise meeting with the club's officers to announce that he is thinking about stepping down.
2	2	"Vegas Repo Mission"	May 15, 2012	1.48
The club's president confronts the founder in a bid to earn respect. Also: A mission to repossess a bike in Las Vegas unfolds.
3	3	"Battle for Brotherhood"	May 22, 2012	1.55
The new club president returns from the Las Vegas mission to find the organization in turmoil. Also: A member is hospitalized.
4	4	"Bad Blood"	May 29, 2012	N/A
The founder causes tension for the club by recruiting former members for his own agenda.
5	5	"Sinister Moves"	June 5, 2012	N/A
Plans for an East County chapter divide the Devils, while Gipsy continues to stun his former brothers with the launch of his new club, Sinister Mob Syndicate. Bad blood between Gipsy and Billy reach a breaking point during a charity ride.
6	6	"Fallen Devil"	June 12, 2012	N/A
A clubhouse war erupts, and a member faces a tragedy.

=== Season 2 (2013) ===
No. overall	No. in season	Title	Original release date	US viewers (millions)
7	1	"First Blood"	February 18, 2013	N/A
A battle for leadership emerges in the Season 2 opener. Later, a rival club is confronted.
8	2	"Bad Out"	February 25, 2013	N/A
The Sinister Mob president attends a secret meeting with the more powerful clubs in the community.
9	3	"Dangerous Tactics"	March 4, 2013	N/A
A member's bike is destroyed by the Sinister Mob.
10	4	"Fight Club"	March 11, 2013	N/A
Violence erupts in the clubhouse; Danny Boy asks Billy the Kid to return.
11	5	"Blood In & Out"	March 18, 2013	N/A
The club prepares to pick a new president.
12	6	"War Crimes"	March 25, 2013	N/A
Danny Boy targets local drug dealers.
13	7	"Enemy Within"	April 1, 2013	N/A
Tempers flare between the Sin Mob leaders.
14	8	"War is Now"	April 8, 2013	N/A
The Sin Mob are attacked at their clubhouse.

=== Season 3 (2014) ===
No. overall	No. in season	Title	Original release date	US viewers (millions)
15	1	"The Brother's Keeper"	February 3, 2014	N/A
Armed thugs strip the club presidents of their kuttes in the Season 3 premiere.
16	2	"Brothers in Arms"	February 10, 2014	N/A
The clubs fight to restore their reputations.
17	3	"New Blood"	February 17, 2014	1.55
Rockem takes extreme measures in order to get in touch with Danny Boy.
18	4	"Broken Brotherhood"	February 24, 2014	N/A
Tank loses his cool, leading to a surprising club vote.
19	5	"Sinister Moves"	March 3, 2014	N/A
Diesel gets devastating news; Mad Max seeks advice from another club.
20	6	"Showdown"	March 10, 2014	N/A
The battle between the Laffing Devils and Sin Mob comes to a head when Rock'em challenges the Devil's to meet them in the desert.
