= Jorge Moreno (musician) =

Cuban-American musician and entrepreneur (born 1975)

- Born: April 23, 1975 (age 51); Miami, Florida, U.S.
- Website: jorgemoreno.com

Jorge Moreno is a Cuban-American musician and entrepreneur. He was winner of the 2002 Latin Grammy Award for Best New Artist, 2003 Grammy Nominee for Best Latin Pop Album, executive producer of American reality television television series The Catalina, and a restaurateur and boutique hotelier.

== Early life ==
Jorge Moreno was born on April 23, 1975, in Miami, Florida. His parents emigrated from Cuba to Miami Beach in 1958, during the dictatorship of Fulgencio Batista; his father, Antonio "Tony" Moreno, was an executive producer, pioneer of Salsa music, and founder of MP Records. As a teenager, Moreno was interested in punk and alternative American rock music, but in his late teens discovered classic Cuban artists such as Beny Moré. In 1996 he began recording demos, and sent them to record executives in pizza boxes to get their attention.

== Career ==
Moreno gained visibility as a songwriter for EMI Music Publishing, and in 2002 Madonna signed him as her first latin artist to Maverick Musica, the Latin imprint of Maverick Records. Moreno won critical acclaim for his debut album Moreno, of which the Los Angeles Times said, "Not since Santana has a U.S.-based Latin performer captured bicultural sensibilities in such a seamless, accessible and original way." In 2002 he was awarded a Latin Grammy Award for Best New Artist, and the following year he received a Grammy nomination for Best Latin Pop Album.

Moreno also received praise and a nomination for Univision's 2003 Lo Nuestro Award for Video of the Year for the self-directed and self-produced "Mi Sufrimiento" video, which features captions jokingly referring to his label's refusal to provide him with funding. One of the first artists to perform in Spanish on Good Morning America, Moreno also performed his alternative version of "Babalu" for both the CBS "I Love Lucy's 50th Anniversary Special" and the 2008 Victoria's Secret Fashion Show.

In 2004, Moreno joined Carlos Santana to record "Satellite" for the Dirty Dancing: Havana Nights soundtrack, and the following year Moreno self-released his second album, El Segundo. In 2011, Moreno won the International Songwriters Contest's Best Video Category for his song "Thank you," with the track itself a semi-finalist for Best Song in the "adult album alternative" category.

Moreno's more recent projects have led to positions such as head of production company Beach Pictures; creator and executive producer of reality series The Catalina; co-founder of social media video app Videoo; co-founder of Grand Havana Coffee Company;, a publicly traded company (GHAV) and owner of Miami restaurants and bars, Mr. Wright's Gold Digger Saloon, Boho House and Moreno's Cuba, the latter called a "hidden gem" of South Beach by Miami New Times Magazine and the Miami Herald. and has also been featured on the Food network and Cooking channel.

Moreno has also entered the boutique Bed and breakfast space with locations in Miami & in the mountains of North Carolina and in the summer of 2026 opened Aire night club & Edge night club partnering with legends of Miami nightlife Louis Puig and Aramis Lorie.
