= Scott Baio Is 45...and Single =

- Created by: Eric Bischoff; Jason Hervey
- Starring: Scott Baio
- Country of origin: United States
- No. of episodes: 8

Production
- Executive producers: Eric Bischoff; Jason Hervey; Scott Baio; JD Roth; Todd A. Nelson; Adam Greener; Jeff Olde; Claire McCabe; Michael Hirschorn
- Running time: 22–24 minutes
- Production companies: Bischoff Hervey Entertainment; 3Ball Productions; VH1

Original release
- Network: VH1
- Release: July 15 – August 26, 2007

Related
- Scott Baio Is 46...and Pregnant

Scott Baio Is 45...and Single is an American reality television show that aired on VH1 starring Scott Baio. The second season, titled Scott Baio Is 46...and Pregnant, began on January 13, 2008.

== Synopsis ==
Under the supervision of his personal life coach, Dr. Alison Arnold, Baio visits some of his old girlfriends over an eight-week period in an attempt to figure out why he cannot commit to only one woman. Dr. Arnold's plan includes Baio apologizing to the exes he hurt and advises him to not see his current girlfriend, Renee, during the eight-week period.

The series also features Baio's three closest friends, including Johnny Venocur (aka "Johnny V") and Jason Hervey (who also created, wrote, and produced the show with Bischoff-Hervey Entertainment's Eric Bischoff). The crew includes several writers, including Bischoff, who held key positions within the WCW (president; head writer; executive producer) and WWE (on-air talent; co-writer) professional wrestling companies.

=== Series finale ===
In the series finale, Baio comes to terms with his commitment issues and proposes to his long-time girlfriend Renee. After the proposal, Renee reveals she is pregnant.

In an interview with William Shatner (featured on Shatner's Raw Nerve), Baio admitted that he and Renee had actually gotten married in their backyard prior to taping it on the reality show.

== Episodes ==
Episode Number	Episode Title	Original Air Date	Guest Appearance
1	"Scott Baio Hires a Life Coach" (Part 1)	July 15, 2007	Clint Howard, Erin Moran, Scott's Mother
2	"Scott Baio Hires a Life Coach" (Part 2)	July 15, 2007	Nicole Eggert, Scott's Mother
3	"Commitment"	July 22, 2007	Julie McCullough
4	"The Perfect Match"	July 29, 2007	
5	"Child's Play"	August 5, 2007	
6	"Intimacy"	August 12, 2007	
7	"What About Your Friends?"	August 19, 2007	
8	"Decision Time"	August 26, 2007	Scott's Mother
