= Ike McFadden =

American film producer (born 1977)

- Born: July 20, 1977 (age 49)
- Occupations: television and film producer and public relations agent

Ike McFadden (born June 20, 1977) is an American video game producer, former television and film producer and public relations agent. He has produced video games featuring Hulk Hogan, David Hasselhoff, The Blues Brothers, Dennis Rodman and James Dean. Together with partners Eric Bischoff and Jason Hervey, he founded the game production company MX Digital.

== Founder and director of MX ==
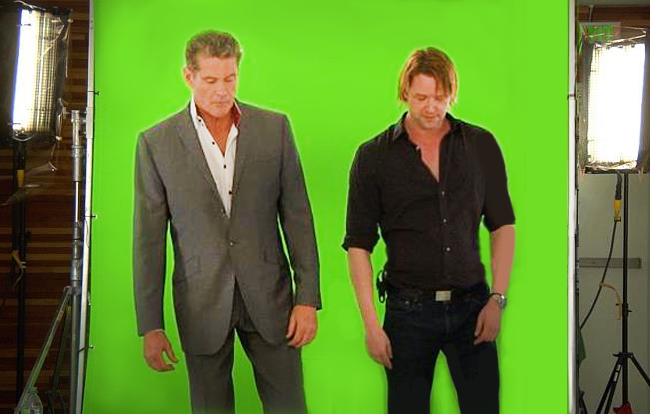
Ike McFadden filming in-game elements with David Hasselhoff

In 2008, Ike McFadden founded MX Gaming. The company, now MX Digital, was based in Los Angeles, and developed and distributed interactive casino and betting games. In December 2012, Bischoff Hervey Entertainment acquired a 50 percent ownership stake in MX Digital.

Among the company's first games was Hulk Hogan's Hulkamania, starring wrestler and actor Hulk Hogan. The game was co-produced by MX Gaming, Bischoff Hervey Entertainment and Endemol Games and debuted on Sky Vegas in November 2012.

In January 2013, MX Digital announced their next game, "The Hoff", featuring actor-singer David Hasselhoff. The game was released in Europe in February 2013.

In March 2014, McFadden and Bischoff's online-gaming company entered a partnership with Blues Brothers Approved Ventures to use the Blues Brothers brand, including support from actor Dan Aykroyd, for online gaming products.

In October 2014, MX Digital launched a free-to-play Facebook app, developed in collaboration with Gibraltar-based marketing firm TraffGen, under the title MX Casino. The app offers social casino slot games and adds MX Digital's collection, including Dennis Rodman, James Dean, David Hasselhoff, Hulk Hogan, and The Blues Brothers in collaboration with British bookmaker William Hill.

== Later activities ==
In 2019, McFadden launched the podcast series "Like Ike" on YouTube featuring popular internet influencers such as controversial rapper and author Zuby
