= Christopher L. Hodapp =

American author and filmmaker

Christopher L. Hodapp (born 1958) is an American author and filmmaker, noted for his writings about Freemasonry, fraternalism, the Knights Templar, secret societies and conspiracy theories. He is the founding editor in chief (now Editor Emeritus) of the Journal of The Masonic Society, the associate director of the Masonic Library and Museum of Indiana, and public relations director for the Grand Lodge of Indiana.

== Career ==
Hodapp studied film production between 1977 and 1983 at Indiana University, the University of Southern California, Los Angeles Valley College and California State University Northridge. In 1984, he became a commercial filmmaker with Dean Crow Productions in Indianapolis, Indiana. He has edited hundreds of television commercials and feature films, and his voice has appeared in numerous broadcast productions.

Hodapp became a Freemason in 1998, and is a 33rd degree Scottish Rite Mason in the Valley of Indianapolis. He is a Past Master of Broad Ripple Lodge No. 643, and Lodge Vitruvian No. 767, one of the first "European Concept" lodges in the U.S. He is a member of the York Rite and a Knight Templar. He is a Past Sovereign Master of the Allied Masonic Degrees, a member of the Ancient Arabic Order of the Nobles of the Mystic Shrine (Shriners), and numerous other Masonic organizations. In 2004, as part of a Masonic think-tank known collectively as the Knights of the North, he co-wrote and edited Laudable Pursuit: A 21st Century Response To The Questions Of Dwight Smith, which is widely recognized as a major influence in the so-called 'traditional observance" Masonic movement in the U.S.

His 2005 book Freemasons For Dummies. has become the world's best-selling introductory guide to the Anglo-American Freemasonry, and it has been adopted by several Masonic grand lodges as part of their education programs for new members. In 2006 Hodapp wrote Solomon's Builders: Freemasons, Founding Fathers and the Secrets of Washington D.C., which explores the early history of the United States and the role Freemasons played in its revolution and founding. It contains a guide to Masonic landmarks in Washington D.C. In 2007, in collaboration with his wife, Alice Von Kannon, he wrote The Templar Code For Dummies, a guide to the medieval Knights Templar, the subsequent mysteries and myths that have surrounded them, and their connections with Dan Brown's The Da Vinci Code. In 2008, Hodapp and Von Kannon published their second collaboration, Conspiracy Theories & Secret Societies For Dummies, which was required reading in a 2010 course on conspiracy at Harvard University. In 2009, he authored Deciphering The Lost Symbol: Freemasons, Myths and the Mysteries of Washington, D.C., a Masonic guidebook to Dan Brown's novel The Lost Symbol.

In 2010, Hodapp and Von Kannon developed episodes for the History Channel program, Brad Meltzer's Decoded, and contributed material on conspiracies and secret societies for TruTV. They are both frequently interviewed on the subject of Freemasonry and other 'secret societies' by the History, Discovery, and American Heroes channels. Their most recent collaboration is RVs and Campers For Dummies for John Wiley and Sons Publishing in 2021.

Hodapp's long membership in the Masonic fraternity in the state of Indiana led to his being commissioned to write an updated history book for the Grand Lodge of Indiana F&AM's bicentennial year of 2018 – Heritage Endures: Perspectives On 200 Years Of Indiana Freemasonry. That same year, he was given the Caleb B. Smith Medal of Honor, the highest honor awarded by the Grand Lodge F&AM of Indiana for his service to Freemasonry.

He has written for Templar History Magazine, Masonic Magazine, The Indiana Freemason Magazine, Knight Templar Magazine, The Phylaxis Magazine, The Scottish Rite Journal, The Square, and Indianapolis Monthly Magazine. Between 2005 and 2008, he wrote a monthly humor column for the Texas-based Living Natural First Magazine, A Pilgrim's Progress: True Tales of an Organic Greenhorn.

Hodapp's Freemasons For Dummies blog started in 2006. In reviewing Masonic websites for the Scottish Rite Journal, author James Tresner called it "thought provoking and is often the first place on the web where new ideas and matters of interest are posted."

In 2012, Hodapp was named as Friar #101 in The Society of Blue Friars, an organization created in 1932 specifically to recognize international authors of books about Freemasonry. In 2019, he was named Worshipful Master of the Dwight L. Smith Lodge of Research U.D. in Indiana.

== Works ==
- Laudable Pursuit: A 21st Century Response To The Questions Of Dwight Smith (editor, co-author), 2004. ISBN 978-0-557-00722-6
- Freemasons For Dummies, 2005. ISBN 0-7645-9796-5
- La Franc-maçonnerie pour les Nuls, Editions First, (with Philippe Benhamou), 2006.
- Solomon's Builders: Freemasons, Founding Fathers and the Secrets of Washington D.C., 2006. ISBN 1-56975-579-5
- The Templar Code For Dummies (with Alice Von Kannon), 2007. ISBN 0-470-12765-1
- Foreword to The Compasses and the Cross by Stephen Dafoe, 2008. ISBN 0-85318-298-1
- Conspiracy Theories And Secret Societies For Dummies (with Alice Von Kannon), 2008. ISBN 0-470-18408-6
- Foreword to My Book, My Opinion: Thoughts Garnered on My Masonic Journey by Hugh Young, 2009. ISBN 978-0-9811780-8-0
- Foreword to Cracking Codes & Cryptograms For Dummies by Denise Sutherland and Mark Koltko-Rivera, 2009. ISBN 0-470-59100-5
- Deciphering The Lost Symbol, 2010. ISBN 1-56975-773-9
- Freemasons For Dummies, 2nd Edition, 2013. ISBN 978-1118412084
- Foreword to George Washington's Rules For Freemasons In Life And Lodge by Mark A. Tabbert, 2016. ISBN 978-0-88053-113-9
- Foreword to The Masonic Pageant: The Scottish Rite Degrees of the Supreme Council, NMJ by Frank Conway, 2017. ISBN 978-1934935927
- Heritage Endures: Perspectives On 200 Years Of Indiana Freemasonry, 2018. ISBN 978-1513629025
- RVs and Campers For Dummies (with Alice Von Kannon), 2021. ISBN 978-1119790341

== Video appearances ==
- Secrets of the Founding Fathers (History) 2009
- Hunting The Lost Symbol (Discovery) 2010
- Templars: Last Stand (Arcadia Entertainment) 2011
- America's Book of Secrets: Freemasons (H2) 2012
- Hardcore Pawn: Chicago: "Paranormal Pawn" (TruTV) 2013
- Codes and Conspiracies: “Freemasons” (American Heroes Channel) 2014
- Inside Secret Societies: “Priory of Sion” (American Heroes Channel) 2016
- America: Facts vs. Fiction: “Secret Societies" (American Heroes Channel) 2017
- Curse of Oak Island: Drilling Down "Oak Island and the Founding Fathers" (History) 2020
- America's Book of Secrets: "The Freemason Factor" (History) 2021
- The UnXplained: Secrets of the Founding Fathers (History) 2022

== See also ==
- Masonic bodies
- The Society of Blue Friars
