= Brian Worley =

American reality television host

Brian Worley (born September 8, 1972) is an American reality television host, event planner, and wedding designer. Worley is the owner of B. Worley Productions in Atlanta, GA where he has produced numerous events within the hospitality and entertainment industries.

== Early life ==
Worley was born in Baton Rouge, Louisiana before he moved to Denver, Colorado at age 2 and Austin, Texas at age 12, where he and his younger sister were raised.

While in high school, Worley worked as camp counselor for Lost Creek Country Club. By spring of 1992, Worley had gained work experience from 3 different jobs including a sales associate position with The Gap, a tour guide position with Disney World’s Great Movie Ride, where he also played the role of Sleeping Beauty's Prince Phillip and Disney’s character Goofy.

Worley graduated cum laude from the University of North Texas with a degree in Radio, Television, and Film.

== Career ==
Worley launched his first business in fashion with B Worley Designs, a clothing design company that expanded its business to stores throughout Texas. Although thriving as a new clothing company at the time, he pursued his true passion in wedding and event planning.

Worley began his career working with “Entertainment Tonight,” MTV, numerous award shows, and high-profile personalities. Worley was soon donned the “event guru” and budget specialist.

Worley’s background in event production and design has led him to creating events such as the polo match featuring Prince William and Catherine Middleton during their visit in the United States on July 8, 2012.

Other events Brian has worked on include:

- "My Little Pony: The Royal Wedding"
- premiere party for FOX’s new show “Alcatraz"
- "Operation Shower" (a charity that provides baby showers for army wives)
- Lounge and gifting suite for the Sundance Film Festival
- CW’s “Shedding for the Wedding,”
- E!'s Party Monsters Cabo
- “Oscar Pre-Show,”
- WE TV’s “Platinum Weddings,”
- The Style Channel’s “Big Party Plan Off,”
- Lifetime’s, “Get Married,”
- TLC’s “Battle of the Wedding Designer,”
- BET’s The Family Crews.
- Grammy After Party
- Costume Designers Guild Awards
- Days of Our Lives Anniversary Party
- Boys and Girls Club Annual Gala
- Food Network's "Wedding Impossible"

Brian has been featured on the following shows and publications:

- CW's San Diego 6 News
- Fox 5 San Diego.
- KTLA
- Vegas Ink
- The Doctors
- Trailer Codes
- People Magazine
- USA Today
- Los Angeles Times

== Personal interests ==
Worley is known for being a green and eco-friendly advocate by implementing the philosophy to “reduce, reuse, and, recycle” through organic and pesticide-free food, bio-diesel generators, rented furniture, recycled fabric, drapes, and linens, and low watt/LED lighting. In 2011, Worley applied this idea through events like the Emmy Awards with 50% recycled material used on the red carpet and conserved 20% of the energy used in lighting.

Brian Worley currently runs an ongoing blog sharing eco-friendly tips, do it yourself ideas, wedding and event planning guides, and links to his work.
