= Alain Bernheim =

French musician (1931–2022)

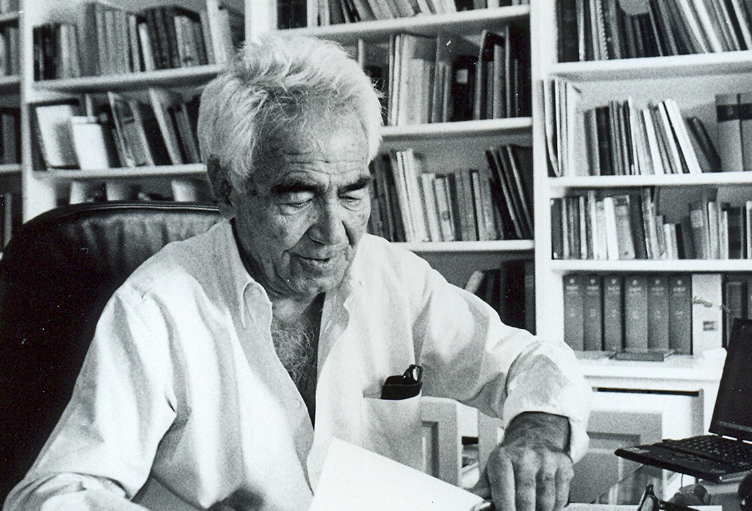
- Born: 23 May 1931; Paris
- Died: 26 December 2022 (aged 91); Montreux, Switzerland
- Education: Paris Conservatory
- Occupations: Classical pianist; Historian
- Website: alainbernheim.wixsite.com

Alain Bernheim (23 May 1931 – 26 December 2022) was a French classical pianist who performed internationally. In 1980, he turned to research of the history of Freemasonry in France, Switzerland, and Germany. He published books and encyclopedic entries in the field.

== Life ==
Bernheim was born in Paris, on 23 May 1931, the son of André Bernheim, the owner and manager of the Théâtre de la Madeleine. At the age of twelve he was arrested by the Gestapo and sent to the internment camp Drancy. At fifteen he was chosen to represent the Lycée Janson-de-Sailly at the Concours Général of philosophy competition. He studied at the Paris Conservatory, receiving a first prize in piano in 1953. Bernheim was among the first French music students to receive a Fulbright scholarship, which allowed him to study further at the New England Conservatory of Music in Boston. He also studied with Hans Richter-Haaser in Detmold and with Magda Tagliaferro in São Paulo. In the 1953 international piano competition in Bucharest, he was awarded a second prize together with Vladimir Ashkenazy.

Bernheim made his Carnegie Hall debut in New York City on 25 February 1960 as a charity for the Red Cross. He performed around 2,000 concerts until 1980, but then gave up his musical career for health reasons. He turned to Masonic research.

A Freemason since 1963, he belonged to the Regular Grand Lodge of Belgium and to the Grand Lodge Alpina of Switzerland. He was awarded the 33° by the Supreme Council of the United States (Southern Jurisdiction), elected a Chapter Knight of the Great Priory of Belgium and was a member of the Royal Order of Scotland. He is also the first French Freemason who was elected a full member of Quatuor Coronati Lodge No. 2076 (United Grand Lodge of England) from which he demitted in 2014. The Supreme Council of France made him a Member of Honour in 2014 and awarded him the distinction of Grand Commander Honoris Causa in 2018.

In 1986 and 1993, he was awarded the Norman Spencer Award by the English premier Lodge of Research Quatuor Coronati Lodge N° 2076, 1997 the Certificate of Literature by the Philalethes Society (US), 2001 the Albert Gallatin Mackey Scholar Award by the Scottish Rite Research Society (Washington, D.C.), which elected him a Fellow, and 2007 was selected a member of The Society of Blue Friars.

Bernheim wrote Les Débuts de la Franc-Maçonnerie à Genève et en Suisse (Slatkine, 1994), many entries of the Encyclopédie de la Franc-Maçonnerie (Pochotèque, 2000), Réalité Maçonnique (Alpina Research Group, Lausanne, 2007) and some 150 papers published in French, English and German masonic magazines. His book Une certaine idée de la franc-maçonnerie, was published September 2008 by Dervy, Paris, and Le rite en 33 grades - De Frederick Dalcho à Charles Riandey, in September 2011, also by Dervy.

Bernheim died in Montreux on 26 December 2022, at the age of 91.
