= Jason Hervey =

American actor (born 1972)

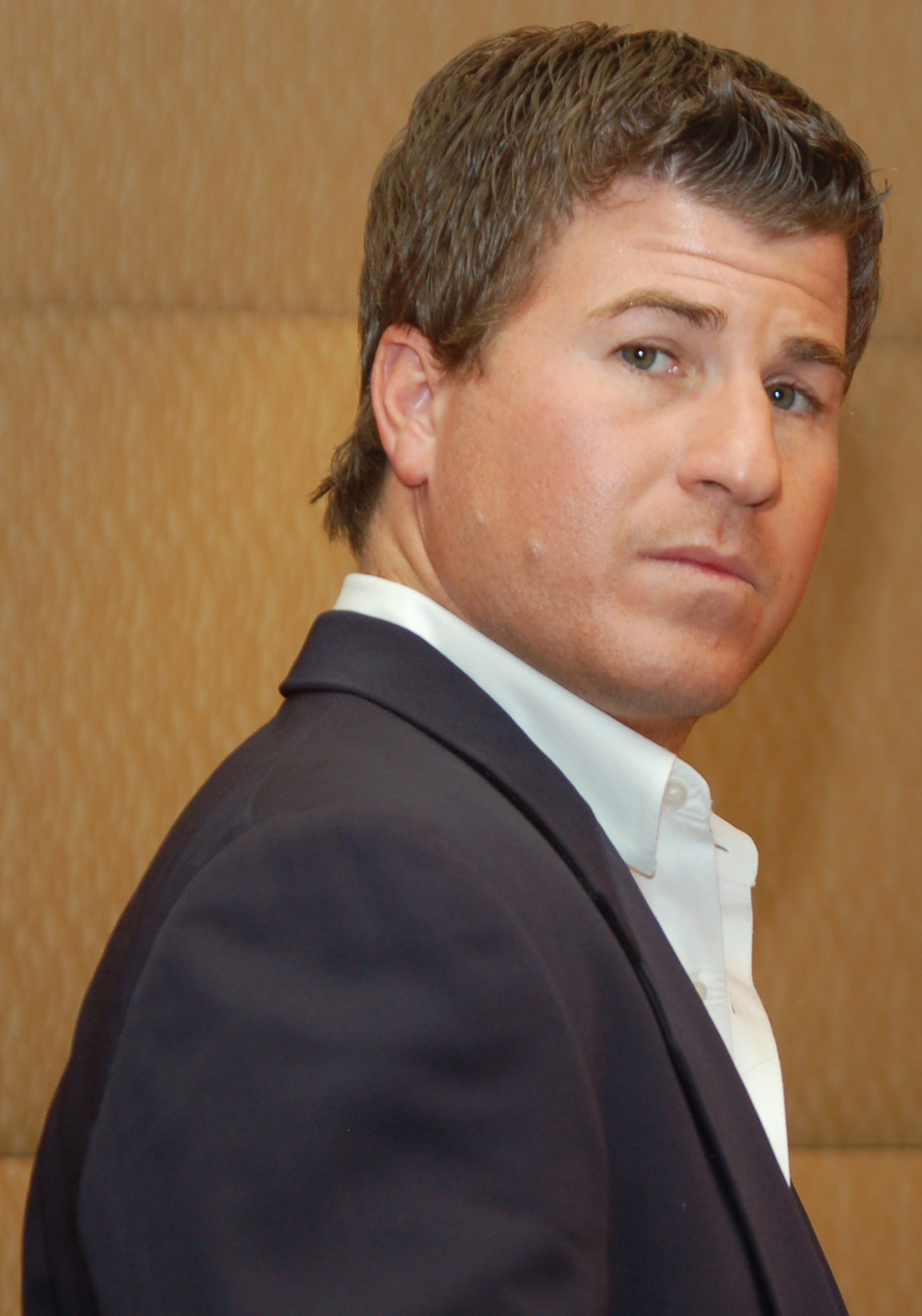
- Hervey in 2008
- Born: Jason Robert Hervey; April 6, 1972 (age 54); Los Angeles, California, U.S.
- Occupations: Actor; producer; writer
- Years active: 1979–present
- Known for: Wayne Arnold on The Wonder Years
- Spouses: Kelley Patricia O'Neill (m. 1994; ann. 1995) Shannon Hervey (m. 1998; div. 2020)
- Children: 4

Jason Robert Hervey (born April 6, 1972) is an American actor and television producer. He is best known for his role as Wayne Arnold on The Wonder Years.

== Early life and acting ==
Hervey was born on April 6, 1972, in Los Angeles, California, the son of Marsha, a talent agent, and Alan Hervey, a retail sales manager. In his early career, Hervey had small roles in films including Back to the Future, Pee-wee's Big Adventure, Meatballs Part II, Police Academy 2: Their First Assignment, and had a recurring role as Charlie in the final season of Diff'rent Strokes. His big break came as a cast member of the successful family dramedy, The Wonder Years, as the older brother of Fred Savage's character. He ranked at #71 on VH1's 100 Greatest Kid Stars for the role.

Hervey's role on The Wonder Years led to a later guest appearance on the animated show Justice League Unlimited. He appeared alongside Savage in the episode "Hawk and Dove", where Hervey provided the voice of the younger, more passive brother Don Hall/Dove, opposite Savage's role of the older and more aggressive brother, in a role reversal from The Wonder Years. The original idea had been to cast Hervey as Hawk in tribute to his role as Wayne Arnold, until both he and Savage felt the opposite roles were better challenges.

Hervey was the voice of Eddie McDowd on the Nickelodeon series 100 Deeds for Eddie McDowd for season two. He made a brief appearance in the 1993 adventure game Return to Zork as the troll king.

While post-Wonder Years acting credits were few and far between for Hervey, he did maintain ties to the entertainment industry as the producer of various sports-themed videos and specials (a substantial number of which were related to the World Championship Wrestling organization), a handful of television films, and a few television series. As the wave of 1980s nostalgia washed over the media in the early 2000s, Hervey became a frequent contributor to VH1's I Love the 80s and I Love the 80s Strikes Back and appeared as himself on reality shows such as Hogan Knows Best and Scott Baio Is 45...and Single.

== Public relations ==
Hervey served as the Senior Vice President of Media and Communications for HealthSouth Corporation, based in Birmingham, Alabama. Hervey relocated to Birmingham to assume the post. He worked for the company from late 2001 until late 2003, during events that would lead to a fraud scandal. He later sued HealthSouth, demanding $300,000 in compensation.

== Producing and game development ==
After a guest appearance on World Championship Wrestling television during his tenure on The Wonder Years, Hervey obtained a backstage position as an executive producer for WCW, which he held until the company's closure in 2001. During this time, he became friends with then-WCW Vice President Eric Bischoff, with whom he formed Bischoff Hervey Entertainment. Their company produced several sports and reality television shows, including I Want to Be a Hilton, Scott Baio Is 45...and Single, and Hulk Hogan's Celebrity Championship Wrestling, alongside Hogan. When Bischoff joined Total Nonstop Action Wrestling (TNA) in January 2010, Hervey also joined the promotion as an executive producer. He co-created the reality show TNA Reaction. Hervey appeared in a backstage segment with Eric Young on the June 16, 2011, edition of Impact Wrestling which was his last appearance.

In 2013, along with partners Eric Bischoff and Ike McFadden, Hervey formed the online gaming company MX Digital. The company specializes in creating celebrity-themed online games, including games featuring David Hasselhoff and Hulk Hogan, among others.

Hervey is credited in The Eddie Guerrero Story: Cheating Death, Stealing Life for coming up with the idea for the Latino World Order (LWO).

== Reality shows ==
Hervey appeared in an episode of Hogan Knows Best alongside Eric Bischoff, talking about energy drinks, and in several episodes of Scott Baio Is 45...and Single. In 2002, he made a brief appearance on the VH1 special I Love the '80s. Along with Baio, he co-hosted VH1's Confessions of a Teen Idol, a reality show in which former teen idols attempt to revitalize their entertainment careers. In February 2015, WGN premiered Bischoff/Hervey's latest production, Outlaw Country, a "reality crime drama" following two sets of brothers, one being on the criminal side of the law and the other being on the law enforcement side. The series ran for eight episodes.

== Filmography ==
Film
Year	Title	Role	Notes
1980	Eggo Waffles: Little Brothers	Dennis	Short film
1984	The Buddy System	Potato	
1984	Meatballs Part II	Steve	
1984	Frankenweenie	Frank Dale	Short
1985	Police Academy 2: Their First Assignment	Brat	
1985	Back to the Future	Milton Baines	
1985	Pee-wee's Big Adventure	Kevin Morton	
1986	Back to School	Young Thornton	
1987	The Monster Squad	E.J.	
1988	Earth Girls Are Easy	Uncredited	boy with water pistol
1993	For Goodness Sake	Short film	
1997	Trading Favors	Andy	
1997	A Day with Officer Pete	—N/a	Short film, writer
1999	The Last Great Ride	Jimmy	
2008	The Butler's in Love	—N/a	Short film, producer

Television
Year	Title	Role	Notes
1979	Trapper John, M.D.	Ricky Mercer	Episode: "What Are Friends For?"
1981	The Love Boat	Billy	Episode: "Aquaphobiac/Humpty Dumpty/The Starmaker"
1981	Gabe and Walker	Kevin	Television film
1982	ABC Afterschool Specials	Roy Rollins	Episode: "Daddy, I'm Their Mama Now"
1983	The Selling of Vince D'Angelo	Vince's Son	Television film
1984	The Ratings Game	Todd Sweeney	Television film
1985	Wildside	Zeke	Main role; 5 episodes
1985	The O'Briens	Son	Television film
1985–1986	Diff'rent Strokes	Charlie	9 episodes
1986	Sidekicks	Bobby	Television film: "The Last Electric Knight"
1986	Fast Times	Curtis / Curtis Spicoli	4 episodes
1986	The Magical World of Disney	Clint Westwood	Episode: "Little Spies"
1987	A Year in the Life		Episode: "Acts of Faith"
1988	Simon & Simon	Bradley	Episode: "Second Swell"
1988	Punky Brewster	Garth Goobler	Episode: "Radio Daze"
1988	Kids Incorporated	Ethan	Episode: "The Frog Prince"
1988–1993	The Wonder Years	Wayne Arnold	Main role; 112 episodes
1991–1992	Wide World of Kids	Host	
1994	Take Me Home Again	Eddie	Television film
1995	Spring Fling!	John	Television film
1995	Baywatch Nights	Todd Sandreen	Episode: "Bad Blades"
1998	Love Boat: The Next Wave	Wally	Episode: "All Aboard"
1999	First Daughter	—N/a	Television film, co-executive producer
1999	Chowdaheads	—N/a	Co-executive producer
2000	Shutterspeed	—N/a	Television film, co-executive producer
2000	First Target	—N/a	Television film, co-executive producer
2002	Go for It!	—N/a	Writer; Executive producer
2002	First Shot	—N/a	Television film, co-executive producer
2001–2002	100 Deeds for Eddie McDowd	Eddie McDowd	Main role
2004	Sturgis: At Full Throttle	—N/a	Television film, co-executive producer
2004	Justice League Unlimited	Don Hall / Dove	Voice, episode: "Hawk and Dove"
2005	I Want to Be a Hilton	—N/a	Writer and co-producer, Episode #1.4
2007	Billy Ray Cyrus: Home at Last	—N/a	Executive producer
2007–2008	Scott Baio Is 45...and Single	—N/a	Writer and executive producer
2008	Hulk Hogan's Celebrity Championship Wrestling	—N/a	Executive producer - Episode 1: "Down to Basics"
2008–2009	Party Monsters Cabo	—N/a	Executive producer; 8 episodes
2009	Confessions of a Teen Idol	Co-host	Executive producer
2009	Runnin' Wild... From Ted Nugent	—N/a	Executive producer
2009	Posse: Young Guns of the PBR	—N/a	Executive producer
2010	Finding Hulk Hogan	—N/a	Documentary, executive producer
2010	Lay It Down	—N/a	Writer and executive producer
2011	Beverly Hills Fabulous	—N/a	Writer and executive producer, 3 episodes
2011	Bear Swamp Recovery	—N/a	Executive producer
2011	Micro Championship Wrestling	—N/a	Writer, 4 episodes Executive producer; episode 1: "Half the Size, Twice the Violence"
2011	Big Easy Brides	—N/a	Writer and executive producer; 8 episodes
2012	The Catalina	—N/a	Writer and executive producer
2012	The Devil's Ride	—N/a	Writer; 6 episodes Executive producer
2012	Gretta Style	—N/a	Producer
2012–2014	See Dad Run	—N/a	Executive producer; 45 episodes
2013	Hardcore Pawn: Chicago	—N/a	Executive producer
2017	Dope Man	—N/a	Documentary; Executive producer
2021	You, Me and the Christmas Trees	Dwayne	Television film

Video games
Year	Title	Role	Notes
1993	Return to Zork	Troll King / Trolls	
