= Society of Blue Friars =

Masonic organization in the United States

- Formation: 1932
- Founder: J. Raymond Shute II
- Type: Masonic organization
- Headquarters: Washington, D.C.
- Website: Official Website

The Society of Blue Friars (SBF) is a Masonic organization established in 1932 with the explicit purpose of recognizing Masonic authors. It is widely regarded as one of the smallest and most distinctive appendant bodies within Freemasonry.

== Structure and operations ==
The core of the organization consists of three officers:

1. The Grand Abbot, who presides over the Society and holds office for as long as they wish or as long as they live.
2. The Deputy Grand Abbot, designated as the successor to the Grand Abbot.
3. The Secretary-General, responsible for administrative matters.

The Grand Abbot has the authority to appoint new Friars, and their decisions are final. Additionally, only the Grand Abbot has the power to change the Society's regulations. The term "Abbot" and "Friar" were deliberately chosen to hark back to monastic traditions of the Middle Ages when monks wrote many of the books of their time.

== Notable Members ==
The following living authors and researchers have been recognized as Friars as of 2026:

- Friar 69. - John M. Hamill (Initiated as a Friar in 1988. Location: England.)
- Friar 79. - Christopher L. Murphy (Initiated as a Friar in 1995. Location: British Columbia, Canada.)
- Friar 83. - S. Brent Morris (Initiated as a Friar in 1998. Location: Maryland, USA. Past Grand Abbot of the Society.)
- Friar 87. - John W. Boettjer (Initiated as a Friar in 1999.Location: District of Columbia, USA.)
- Friar 88. - Arturo de Hoyos (Initiated as a Friar in 2000. Location: Virginia, USA. Serves as Grand Abbot of the Society.)
- Friar 89. - Leon Zeldis (Initiated as a Friar in 2000. Location: Israel.)
- Friar 92. - Robert L. Uzzel (Initiated as a Friar in 2003. Location: Texas, USA.)
- Friar 95. - Mark A. Tabbert (Initiated as a Friar in 2006. Location: Virginia, USA.)
- Friar 97. - Gary H. Leazer (Initiated as a Friar in 2008.Location: Georgia, USA.)
- Friar 98. - Yasha Beresiner (Initiated as a Friar in 2009. Location: England.)
- Friar 99. - Pierre G. Normand, Jr. (Initiated as a Friar in 2010.Location: Texas, USA.)
- Friar 100. - Alton G. Roundtree (Initiated as a Friar in 2011.Location: District of Columbia, USA.)
- Friar 101. - Christopher L. Hodapp (Initiated as a Friar in 2012. Location: Indiana, USA.)
- Friar 102. - Shawn E. Eyer (Initiated as a Friar in 2013. Location: Virginia, USA. Serves as Deputy Grand Abbot of the Society.)
- Friar 103. - Robert G. Davis (Initiated as a Friar in 2014. Location: Oklahoma, USA)
- Friar 104. - Robert A. Domingue (Initiated as a Friar in 2014. Location: Massachusetts, USA)
- Friar 105. - Michael A. Halleran (Initiated as a Friar in 2015. Location: Kansas, USA)
- Friar 106. - Michael R. Poll (Initiated as a Friar in 2016. Location: Louisiana, USA)
- Friar 107. - Robert L. D. Cooper (Initiated as a Friar in 2017. Location: Scotland)
- Friar 108. - Josef Wäges (Initiated as a Friar in 2018. Location: Texas, USA)
- Friar 109. - Piers A. Vaughan (Initiated as a Friar in 2019. Location: New York, USA)
- Friar 110. - Kamel Oussayef (Initiated as a Friar in 2020. Location: Massachusetts, USA)
- Friar 111. - Adam G. Kendall (Initiated as a Friar in 2022. Location: California, USA)
- Friar 112. - John W. Bizzack (Initiated as a Friar in 2024. Location: Kentucky, USA)
- Friar 113. - Ric Berman (Initiated as a Friar in 2025. Location: England)
- Friar 114. - Paul Rich (Initiated as a Friar in 2026. Location: Washington, DC, USA)

== Contributions and achievements ==
Arturo de Hoyos, the Grand Abbot of the Society of Blue Friars, is a one of the most prolific Masonic scholars of the past century, having written, edited and/or translated more than 60 works. He serves as the Grand Archivist and Grand Historian of the Supreme Council, 33°, S.J., the largest Masonic organization in the world. Since 1994 he has served as the Grand Archivist of the Grand College of Rites, USA, a Masonic organization dedicated to the preservation study of ritual. He has an international reputation as a scholar in the history, ritual, symbolism and philosophy of Freemasonry. His 1200-page book The Scottish Rite Ritual Monitor and Guide is the official guide to the rituals of the Southern Jurisdiction, the creators of the Scottish Rite. His book Albert Pike's Morals and Dogma: Annotated Edition is considered a gold-standard of academic research, and includes over 4000 critical notes and hundred of references. He was the first person to receive both the Albert G. Mackey Masonic Scholarship Award and the Albert G. Mackey Lifetime Achievement Award from the Scottish Rite Research Society. He is arguably the best all-around Masonic scholar living, since he expertise is recognized in virtually every field of Freemasonry. Thus, he serves as a special consultant to numerous Masonic organizations, and lectures worldwide. In 2000 de Hoyos was one of three people invited to the Vatican by high officials of the Roman Catholic Church, to discuss Freemasonry. Like Hammil, Morris, Tabbert, Kendall and Bermann, de Hoyos, is also a full member of Quatuor Coronati Lodge 2076, London, the premiere Lodge of Masonic Research.

Christopher L. Hodapp is a well-known Masonic author and researcher. He gained recognition as Friar #101 in the Society of Blue Friars in 2012. Hodapp is the creator of the widely read "Freemasons For Dummies" blog, established in 2006, which is a significant source of current international news about the Masonic fraternity.

In 2019, Christopher L. Hodapp was named Worshipful Master of the Dwight L. Smith Lodge of Research in Indiana.

Alain Bernheim, an esteemed Freemason since 1963, held memberships in the Regular Grand Loge of Belgium and the Grand Lodge Alpina of Switzerland. He was also awarded the 33° by the Supreme Council of the United States (Southern Jurisdiction) and was elected a Chapter Knight of the Great Priory of Belgium. Furthermore, he was a member of the Royal Order of Scotland. Notably, he became the first French Freemason to be elected as a full member of Quatuor Coronati Lodge No. 2076 under the United Grand Lodge of England. The Supreme Council of France recognized him as a Member of Honour in 2014 and awarded him the distinction of Grand Commander Honoris Causa in 2018.

Alain Bernheim was awarded the Norman Spencer Award by the premier Lodge of Research, Quatuor Coronati Lodge No. 2076, in 1986 and 1993. He also received the Certificate of Literature from the Philalethes Society (US) in 1997. In 2001, he was honored with the Albert Gallatin Mackey Scholar Award by the Scottish Rite Research Society (Washington, D.C.), which also elected him as a Fellow. In 2007, he was selected as a member of the Society of Blue Friars.

== Sources ==
- Abbot. (n.d.). Retrieved from Online Etymology Dictionary.
- Bessel, P. M., & McLeod, W. (n.d.). Society of Blue Friars. Retrieved from Paul M. Bessel's Homepage.
- Friar. (n.d.). Retrieved from Online Etymology Dictionary.
- Information. Retrieved from The Society of Blue Friars.
- Morris, S. D. (2006). The Complete Idiot's Guide to Freemasonry. New York: Penguin Publisher.
- Regulations. (n.d.). Retrieved from The Society of Blue Friars.
- Society of Blue Friars. (2009, February 17). Retrieved from The Magpie Mason.
