= Scott Baio Is 46...and Pregnant =

- Created by: Eric Bischoff; Jason Hervey
- Starring: Scott Baio
- Country of origin: United States
- No. of seasons: 1
- No. of episodes: 9

Production
- Running time: 30 Minutes
- Production companies: Bischoff/Hervey Entertainment; 3Ball Productions; VH1 Productions

Original release
- Network: VH1
- Release: January 13 – March 16, 2008

Related
- Scott Baio Is 45...and Single

Scott Baio Is 46...and Pregnant is an American reality series that aired on VH1 from January to March 2008. The series stars Scott Baio.

== Synopsis ==
The series focuses on Baio and his wife, Renee, as he copes with the realization of becoming a first-time father to a baby girl at the age of 46.
