= Kinsey Schofield =

American journalist and presenter (born 1985)

- Born: March 27, 1985 (age 41); Austin, Texas, U.S.
- Occupation: Television presenter
- Notable credit: Party Monsters Cabo (2nd place)
- Television: KSAZ-TV; KNXV-TV (2016–2017); KMAX-TV and KOVR (2017); WGNO (2018–2019)
- Website: kinseyschofield.com

Kinsey Lea Schofield (born March 27, 1985) is an American commentator. She was a contestant on E! Television's Party Monsters Cabo reality show. She converted her reality TV fame into television and digital presenting. She has been an entertainment reporter for RadarOnline.com, YoungHollywood.com and E! Television. Schofield has her own YouTube show where she discusses the British Royal Family.

== Career ==
Schofield was a contestant on the E! television reality show, Party Monsters Cabo, where she was the runner-up in an event planning competition. She was a recurring guest on Fox News's Red Eye w/ Greg Gutfeld. Additional Fox News national appearances included Your World with Neil Cavuto, Fox & Friends, Happening Now and Strategy Room with Jill Dobson.

Schofield was an entertainment reporter for YoungHollywood.com, RadarOnline.com, 1iota, Teen.com and Alloy Entertainment. Schofield is featured in numerous E! television pop culture comedy specials including Celebrity Oops: They Did It Again, Bigger Badder Celebrity Feuds, Attack of the Celebrity Bikinis and Worst Thing I Ever Posted. She has appeared multiple times on Adam Carolla's podcast, filling in as the news girl. Schofield may be most recognized for her Jodi Arias trial coverage on HLN's Nancy Grace, Dr. Drew on Call and Jane Velez-Mitchell.

Schofield was featured on the January 2010 cover of Entrepreneur magazine with the headline "Blog Like A Rockstar". She appeared on the July 2013 So Scottsdale magazine cover with the headline "Social Media Maven" and the March 2014 cover of Arizona Foothills magazine with the headline, "Best of the Valley".

She covered the Jodi Arias murder trial for Phoenix's KPNX and nationally for Dr. Drew on Call, Nancy Grace and Jane Velez-Mitchell on HLN. She has covered politics and pop culture in the newsrooms of KMAX, KSAZ and KNXV. At the height of the #MeToo movement, Schofield is credited for bringing to light a 1991 interview in which Bette Midler accuses Geraldo Rivera of drugging and groping Midler without her consent.

Schofield also hosts Kinsey Schofield Unfiltered on YouTube, where she covers the British Royal Family from an American perspective. She and guests, such as royal expert Hugo Vickers and pop culture podcaster Maureen Callahan, often focus discussion around Prince Harry and Meghan Markle.
