= TNA Reaction =

- Created by: Eric Bischoff; Jason Hervey; Dixie Carter
- Starring: Total Nonstop Action Wrestling roster
- Opening theme: "Hard To See" by Five Finger Death Punch
- Country of origin: United States
- No. of seasons: 1
- No. of episodes: 23

Production
- Production location: Impact Wrestling Zone
- Running time: 60 minutes

Original release
- Network: Spike
- Release: April 12 – December 30, 2010

TNA Reaction is an American professional wrestling-focused documentary-style television program by Total Nonstop Action Wrestling (TNA) that aired in the United States and Canada on Spike. The show aired two pilot episodes and a twenty-episode limited run through late 2010, and aired its final episode on December 30, 2010.

== Broadcast history ==
=== Season 1 ===
TNA Reaction aired its pilot episode on a Monday night on April 12, 2010 at 7pm ET/6C. On May 3, 2010, TNA announced that Spike had picked up Reaction and that the program would start airing every Thursday, prior to that week's edition of Impact!, starting June 24 at 8pm ET/7C. The premiere date was later pushed back to July 15, when it would start airing after Impact! at 11pm ET/10C instead of before it. However, in late June Reaction was pulled from Spike's schedule. On August 3, 2010, TNA announced that Reaction would premiere on August 12 and air every Thursday following Impact! on 11pm ET/10C. After an initial run of ten episodes, it was announced that Spike had picked up the show for ten more episodes. On December 27, 2010, it was confirmed that Spike had canceled the show and its final episode would be airing on December 30, 2010.

== Format ==
The show was composed largely of segments mimicking a cinéma-vérité documentary, catching wrestlers unawares backstage preparing for their matches, or expressing their emotions immediately following their matches. Some were "on-the-spot" sit-down interviews regarding the current happenings within the company's storylines. Most of the high-volume, intense yelling typical of wrestling interviews was removed with this format, giving it a feeling of spontaneity, candidness and verisimilitude. After the pilot episode, this style of segment largely replaced the typical structured interview segment (with an interviewer and a set) on the company's flagship show Impact. TNA superstars featured include A.J. Styles, Hulk Hogan, Jeff Hardy, Kurt Angle, and Mr. Anderson and many more.

Other segments included the Impact Player of the Week, which highlighted a wrestler with sit-down interviews and source footage from their life, akin to similar segments from WWE Confidential.

The show began with an extension of the final scene from that week's Impact, with commentary from Mike Tenay and Taz. The last three months of the show's existence, Impact! main events continued into Reaction time slot, effectively giving Impact! a third broadcast hour.

On the November 18, 2010, broadcast of Reaction, an "unofficial" Empty Arena grudge match was shown, held between Generation Me and The Motor City Machine Guns. It was filmed in the similar candid manner of other Reaction segments, with minimal commentary overdubbed.
