= Hardcore Pawn: Chicago =

American reality television series

- Genre: Reality
- Starring: Randy Cohen; Wayne Cohen
- Country of origin: United States
- Original language: English
- No. of seasons: 1
- No. of episodes: 18

Production
- Executive producers: Eric Bischoff; Jason Hervey; Richard Calderon
- Running time: 22 minutes
- Production company: Bischoff-Hervey Entertainment

Original release
- Network: truTV
- Release: January 1 – August 25, 2013

Related
- Hardcore Pawn

Hardcore Pawn: Chicago is an American reality television series on truTV. A spin-off of Hardcore Pawn, the series follows the day-to-day operations of the Royal Pawn Shop located in Chicago, Illinois, at 428 S. Clark Street across from the Metropolitan Correctional Center near Chicago's Financial District.

On August 15, 2012, truTV ordered 18 half-hour episodes for the first season which first premiered on January 1, 2013. In January 2014, truTV announced that the show had been canceled.

The location has been featured multiple on the television show, Chicago P.D..

== Cast ==
- Randy Cohen ‒ owner
- Wayne Cohen ‒ owner
- Elyse Cohen ‒ Randy Cohen's daughter, co-owner
- Nate Cohen ‒ Wayne Cohen's son, co-owner
- Hymie "Hy" Mischoulam ‒ store manager
- Carl "Carlos" Deals ‒ security
- Lee Rogers ‒ head of security, fur expert, known as "Rogers"
- Jeremy Jackson ‒ employee

== Episodes ==
No.	Title	Original release date	U.S. viewers (millions)
1	"Something's Missing"	January 1, 2013	2.11
A woman comes in to redeem her pawn of her diamond ring; however, no one was able to find it. However, things would later get hairy when she threatens to call her attorney when they were unable to produce the ring, going so far as refusing to take a monetary offer for it, as the ring had more sentimental value than monetary value. Also: a man comes in to sell pictures of the astronauts from the early-1960s, including John Glenn, though its value will depend on whether or not autopen was used. And a man sells a prosthetic leg that he claimed came from the Civil War era.
2	"Wedding Crashers"	January 8, 2013	1.98
Royal Pawn Shop normally doesn't sell bridal dresses, but with a bridal fair going on that weekend in Chicago, Wayne had a bright idea -- buy used bridal dresses in bulk and sell them for a profit. While his sale drew in a lot of brides-to-be, Wayne finds out the hard way that he doesn't know a thing about selling bridal dresses.
3	"Changing of the Guard"	January 15, 2013	2.02
Randy notices that the security crew, including Carlos and Rogers, are not only late in opening the store, but they have become lax in their security details, leading to a television being stolen under their noses while the thief's accomplice complains over the value of a mink coat. At that point, Randy placed Carlos and Rogers on notice -- one more mistake and they're fired. Furthermore, Elyse volunteers to be their security supervisor, despite Randy's doubts. Later, Carlos and Rogers would prove that they were serious about their employment when they confront a guitar thief, while that thief's accomplice complains about his "stolen" laptop.
4	"The Kids Are Alright"	January 22, 2013	2.16
Randy and Wayne drive to the suburbs to visit a man who's selling everything in his "man cave", including sports memorabilia, but the price Randy and Wayne will pay will come down to a turn of a card. Meanwhile, Elyse and Nate watch over the store, but when Hymie called in sick, they had no choice but to wing it with their own intuition, which ended up proving very costly for the store -- until a customer came in with a rare opal.
5	"The Competition"	January 29, 2013	1.99
When Randy noticed that Wayne had sold a Rolex watch to a chain smoker for less than value, he challenges him to a contest -- the man who sells the least amount of items in monetary value must parade up and down Clark Street in a "money suit", advertising the store.
6	"Paranormal Pawn"	February 5, 2013	2.15
Wayne and Randy take in some Freemasonry memorabilia from a family who believed that their house became haunted because of it. However, after they took possession of it, the store itself became haunted, to a point where it took a dangerous turn when Hymie accidentally dropped acid used for gold testing in his eye instead of eye drops, which was right next to the bottle of acid. As a result, Wayne became reluctant to buy the items for any price, as he fears for his life, but Randy, however, was still game, chalking everything up to odd coincidences. To help calm everybody's nerves, they call in Masonic expert Christopher L. Hodapp, who gets to the bottom of things.
7	"Two Heads are Better Than One"	February 12, 2013	1.10
A circus freak, who was capable of eating light bulbs (which he demonstrated), stopped by to sell a taxidermied calf with two heads and five legs. Wayne and Randy were skeptical at first, thinking it was fake, but when an expert proved that it was real, Wayne saw it as an opportunity to use it to promote the shop -- providing that he reaches a favorable deal with the seller. Also: a man, just released from prison, came to redeem his pawn for his watch, only to learn that pawns don't wait for prison terms to finish.
8	"A Dangerous Combination Part 1"	February 19, 2013	1.194
A man came in to sell a safe originally used at a hotel, dating back to Chicago's gangster era. Randy refuses to buy the safe, but Wayne buys it behind his back. A buyer is interested in purchasing the safe, but Wayne wants to know what was inside first. Also: a man gets very belligerent when Randy doesn't offer him enough for his heavily flawed diamond. And another man came to pawn his 1969 Yenko Camaro, but Randy tries to talk him into selling it instead.
9	"A Dangerous Combination Part 2"	February 26, 2013	1.47
Continuing from last episode, Wayne tried to get a safecracker to open the safe, but failing that, he had someone come and drill the safe open -- something that costs $300 to do, furthering Randy's anger about the situation. Whether or not Randy's attitude changes depends on the contents of the safe. Also: a couple try to sell several designer handbags, which were proven by an expert to be fake.
10	"Pawned Off"	June 18, 2013	1.02
A customer comes in to redeem his pawn of a late-19th Century Hamilton railroader's watch -- a family heirloom -- but no one was able to find the watch. Later, he gets very angry when he found out that Hymie sold the watch by mistake, and he refuses any money to make up for it. As a result, Randy and Wayne visit the person who bought the watch, with Randy offering as much money as it takes to get it back -- but the buyer refuses to sell the watch back at any cost. But Wayne comes up with a solution, involving the watch's backstory.
11	"Hot or Not?"	June 25, 2013	1.25
Wayne scores a good deal on a stereo system from a long time customer, but Randy thinks its too good to be true.
12	"Lucky Horseshoe?"	July 2, 2013	0.89
Wayne purchases a horseshoe signed by famed jockey Willie Shoemaker that was said to have been used on his last winning racehorse, Beau Genius. The sale also includes a tip on a longshot on a racehorse at a local track. While the horseshoe and signature was proved to be fake, Wayne still hopes that it'll give him luck, in hopes that the tip would lead to a win.
13	"Hot Dog Cart, Part 1"	July 9, 2013	1.112
Carlos, fed up for not getting enough pay for his security guard work, walks off the job, forcing Randy and Wayne to find a substitute. Also: Randy and Wayne purchase a velvet-lined case that claimed to have come from the gangster era and once contained a Tommy Gun. And Wayne walks away from making a deal on a hot dog cart, but when he realised that he could make a profit on it, he changes his mind -- behind Randy's back.
14	"Hot Dog Cart, Part 2"	July 16, 2013	0.74
Wayne decides to use the hot dog cart to start a new sideline for Royal Jewelry -- selling hot dogs on the street, so he set up a deal with Degrazzi, a shady customer, to supply him with hot dogs, buns, and a license. But Wayne ended up learning about food sales the hard way -- from the lobster restaurant next door (for stealing his customers), another hot dog vendor (for invading his territory), the sanitary inspector (for selling spoiled, out of date hot dogs without a license), Degrazzi (for making him look bad), and even Randy (for losing money for the pawn shop).
15	"Diamonds are Forever"	July 23, 2013	0.89
For $60,000, Randy and Wayne buy a set of flawless diamonds that Wayne thinks was cut from the Marlborough diamond, a 26-carat diamond that was part of a 1980 London robbery committed by two Chicago-based mafiosi: Joseph Scalise and Arthur Rachel. While Randy would rather just have the diamonds certified, Wayne had a diamond expert friend of his examine them instead, thinking that if it was the Marlborough diamond, he could get reward money exceeding the money they paid for them.
16	"Comic Book Caper"	July 30, 2013	0.63
A mother, with her son away at college, makes a deal with Wayne and Randy to sell his comic books for $100, after an expert they hired determined their value. However, she later called off the deal when she got a better offer from another dealer, who was offering her $200. They would later find out that the other buyer was actually the expert that they had hired. Furthermore, they found the reason why the expert wanted the comics -- it included a copy of Amazing Fantasy #15, which featured the debut of Spider-Man, valued at around $12,000.
17	"Russian Roulette"	August 6, 2013	0.80
Wayne had received numerous phone calls from Degrazzi, the guy that scammed him on the hot dog cart business; later, he left for unknown business, knowing that he was supposed to return on time to join Randy for an important meeting that could open up a lucrative opportunity for Royal Jewelry. Later, a customer recovered Wayne's "lost" wallet. And when it came time for the meeting, Wayne was a no-show. But when Wayne's wife said that he wasn't at home, Randy fears that Wayne was a victim of foul play.
18	"Swap Meet Millionaires"	August 25, 2013	0.88
Randy and Wayne go to an outdoor flea market at the Allstate Arena in Rosemont, where they appraise others' collectibles and antiques, not unlike Antiques Roadshow. However, an appraisal for a painting, for which another dealer offered $1000, may be worth much more if genuine.
