= The Catalina =

American reality television series

- Opening Title
- Genre: Reality
- Created by: Eric Bischoff; Jason Hervey
- Starring: Karina d'Erizans; Victoria Serra; Stephanie Andron; Nathan Lieberman; Nancy Sayegh; Malwina Morgan; Kris Andres; Eyal Vaknin; David Turetsky; Denia Hall
- Country of origin: United States
- Original language: English
- No. of seasons: 1
- No. of episodes: 6

Production
- Executive producers: Eric Bischoff; Jason Hervey
- Running time: 42 minutes
- Production companies: Bischoff Hervey Entertainment; Beach Pictures; Warner Horizon Television

Original release
- Network: The CW
- Release: May 29 – July 3, 2012

The Catalina is an American reality television television series that aired on The CW. The series debuted on May 29, 2012.

== Episodes ==
| No. | Title | Original release date | U.S. viewers (millions) |
|---|---|---|---|
| 1 | "Spring Breakdown" | May 29, 2012 | 0.94 |
The newest employee, David, attempts to befriend his fellow co-workers and ends up achieving more than he expects. Morgan, general manager of the Kung Fu restaurant, learns how to control her temper while working. Nancy and Kris, who formerly dated, play a jealously game which leads to Nancy stumbling upon Kris flirting with a hotel guest during Spring Break.
| 2 | "Bikinis and Break-Ups" | June 5, 2012 | 0.65 |
Nancy and Kris resolve their past issues and end up dating again. Nathan attempts to be the hotel handyman and do too many tasks at once, which frustrates his co-workers. Morgan works hard as she has been assigned to organize a bikini fashion show inside her restaurant.
| 3 | "Don't Rain on My Parade" | June 12, 2012 | 0.55 |
Eyal, along with the staff, create a float for the local Gay Pride parade in South Beach. Hotel Manager, Stephanie, finds a connection with one of the guests.
| 4 | "Sex in South Beach" | June 19, 2012 | 0.77 |
Eyal figures out that Morgan is much more happier since she's established a strong sex life and released stress. Karina is surprised when David tricks Stephanie to thinking he's good for a management position.
| 5 | "Smackdown" | June 26, 2012 | 0.49 |
Stephanie and Morgan's friendship is left in divide after the hotel hosts a polo tournament, which creates major stress. Kris shocks his co-workers with some unacceptable behavior. David gets inspiration from professional wrestlers.
| 6 | "Ghosts and Gossip" | July 3, 2012 | 0.47 |
Kris finally hints to Stephanie that he wants to be more than friends, which causes the staff to spread rumors. Paranormal investigators tell the staff whether their hotel is haunted or not. Morgan is angry when Nathan tries to create a last minute Cinco de Mayo party and shockingly threatens to quit.

== Reception ==
Brian Lowry of Variety called the series "a Jersey Shore wannabe," adding "The Catalina feels like a fairly sedate knockoff of numerous concepts."

On June 14, 2012 The CW announced that it would replace encores of The Catalina with repeats of 90210.
