= Spring Fling! =

- Film poster
- Genre: Comedy
- Teleplay by: Carol Starr Schneider
- Story by: Bart Baker; Carol Starr Schneider
- Directed by: Chuck Bowman
- Starring: James Eckhouse; Joyce DeWitt; Justin Burnette; Pat Harrington Jr.; Jason Hervey
- Country of origin: United States
- Original language: English

Production
- Executive producers: Chuck Bowman; S. Bryan Hickox
- Producer: S. Bryan Hickox
- Cinematography: Joseph Mangine
- Running time: 95 minutes
- Production companies: Hickox-Bowman Productions Inc. Victor Television Productions Inc.

Original release
- Network: ABC
- Release: April 15, 1995

Spring Fling! is a 1995 American made-for-television comedy film directed by Chuck Bowman and starring James Eckhouse, Joyce DeWitt, Justin Burnette, Pat Harrington Jr., Jason Hervey.

== Plot ==
Teacher, has taken her class on an excursion in Los Angeles. Problems begin when they get lost and the hotel they were supposed to stay at loses their reservations. After driving around they end up in an empty hotel.

== Cast ==
- James Eckhouse as George
- Joyce DeWitt as Linda Hayden
- Justin Burnette as Teddy
- Pat Harrington Jr. as Guido Mazzolini
- Jason Hervey as John
- Christopher Daniel Barnes as Michael

== Production ==
Spring Fling! was filmed mostly at San Diego and Mission Beach in California.
