= Justin Burnette =

American actor

- Born: October 1, 1981 (age 44); San Diego, California
- Occupation: Actor
- Years active: 1988–1998
- Relatives: Olivia Burnette (sister)

Justin Burnette (born October 1, 1981) is an American former child actor, active between 1988 and 1998. He was nominated for the Young Artist Awards five times. He is the brother of actress Olivia Burnette.

== Filmography ==
- 1998 : Escape from Atlantis (TV) .... Adam Spencer
- 1997 : Wings .... Spencer (episode : House of Blues)
- 1996 : Chicago Hope .... David's Brother (episode : Women on the Verge)
- 1995 : Jack Reed: One of Our Own (TV) .... John Reed Jr.
- 1995 : Spring Fling! (TV) .... Teddy
- 1994 : Jack Reed: A Search for Justice (TV) .... John Reed Jr.
- 1994 : The Yarn Princess (TV) .... Mike
- 1993 : Jack Reed: Badge of Honor (TV) .... John Reed Jr.
- 1992–1994 : Hearts Afire .... Ben Hartman (semi-regular appearances)
- 1992 : Major Dad .... Charlie (episode : Three's a Crowd)
- 1991 : Dynasty: The Reunion (TV) .... Danny Carrington
- 1991 : N.Y.P.D. Mounted (TV) .... Bob Coltrane
- 1990-1991 : The Flash (TV) .... Shawn Allen
- 1990 : Shattered Dreams (TV) .... Luke, age 9
- 1989 : Who's the Boss .... Brandon (episode : To Tony with Love)
- 1989 : Empty Nest .... Eddie (episode : Just You and My Kid)
- 1989 : Designing Women .... Harold Thomas (episode : Come on and Marry Me, Bill)
- 1988–1989 : Dynasty .... Danny Carrington (#3)
- 1988 : Disaster at Silo 7 (TV) .... T.J. Fitzgerald
- 1988 : Take My Daughters, Please (TV) .... Jared
