= Eric Bischoff =

American wrestler and television producer (born 1955)

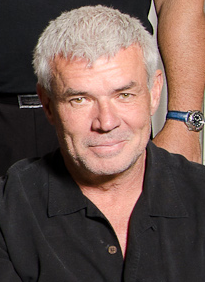
- Bischoff in 2011

Personal information
- Full name: Eric Aaron Bischoff
- Born: May 27, 1955 (age 71) Detroit, Michigan, U.S.
- Spouses: Kimberly Bowman (m. 1977; div. 1980) Loree Bischoff (m. 1984)
- Children: 2, including Garett
- Website: ericbischoff.com

Professional wrestling career
- Ring name: Eric Bischoff
- Billed height: 5 ft 10 in (178 cm)
- Billed weight: 195 lb (88 kg)
- Billed from: Detroit, Michigan
- Debut: 1982
- Retired: 2014

YouTube information
- Channel: 83 Weeks with Eric Bischoff
- Years active: 2018–present
- Genre: Professional wrestling
- Subscribers: 150 thousand
- Views: 31.3 million
- Last updated: October 17, 2026

Eric Aaron Bischoff (born May 27, 1955) is an American television producer, professional wrestling booker, promoter, and performer. He is the chief media officer for Real American Freestyle. He is best known for serving as Executive Producer and later Senior Vice President of World Championship Wrestling (WCW) and subsequently, the on-screen General Manager of WWE's Raw brand. Bischoff has also worked with Total Nonstop Action Wrestling (TNA) where he served as Executive Producer of TNA iMPACT!. He was inducted into the WWE Hall of Fame in 2021.

With an amateur background in martial arts, Bischoff also sporadically performed as an in-ring competitor, becoming a one-time WCW Hardcore Champion, and headlining the 1998 Road Wild pay-per-view event, teaming with "Hollywood" Hulk Hogan against Diamond Dallas Page and Jay Leno. He wrote an autobiography titled Controversy Creates Cash, which was released in 2006 under WWE Books, and a second book, titled Grateful, which was released in 2022.

== Early life ==
Eric Bischoff was born on May 27, 1955, in Detroit, Michigan, where he attended Dort Elementary School in suburban Roseville and grew up as a wrestling fan. Just before high school, his family relocated to Pittsburgh, Pennsylvania, where he began competing in amateur wrestling. Bischoff later moved to Minneapolis, Minnesota, for his senior year of high school, continuing his amateur wrestling career at Minnetonka High School until a knee injury ended his season. Bischoff is of German and Scottish descent. Before getting into professional wrestling, Bischoff had a number of occupations. He acted in a training video for bank employees regarding fair lending practices, owned a successful landscape construction company, worked as a veterinary assistant, competed as a professional kickboxer, and ran a butcher shop, where he sold meat via van delivery. Hulk Hogan would famously refer to this time in his life during his heel promo at the end of the 1996 WCW pay-per-view event Bash at the Beach in Daytona Beach, Florida, saying, "If it wasn't for Hulk Hogan, Eric Bischoff would still be selling meat from a truck in Minneapolis."

== Professional wrestling career ==
=== American Wrestling Association (1986–1991) ===
Bischoff started in wrestling working for the Minneapolis, Minnesota based American Wrestling Association (AWA) in 1987 under the ownership of Verne Gagne. In 1989, Bischoff would become an on-air interviewer and host of the AWA until the company folded in 1991. Bischoff at first worked in the sales department on the AWA's syndicated programming, and became an on-air personality virtually by accident and at the last minute. Larry Nelson, whom at the time was employed by the AWA as an announcer, was arrested under suspicion of a DUI. Because of Nelson's sudden unavailability, Verne Gagne and his son, Greg opted to recruit Bischoff (who initially had no desire to be in front of the camera) to fill-in on the interviews. Bischoff believed they thought he would be a good replacement due to his immediate availability in the television studio, and the fact that he was already wearing a suit and tie.

During the gradual demise of the AWA, the company was unable to meet payroll, and Bischoff auditioned for an announcer's position with the World Wrestling Federation (WWF) in 1990 but was not hired. During his audition, Bischoff was asked to do an on-camera interview to a broom, which Bischoff would later consider a huge embarrassment for himself.

In his autobiography Controversy Creates Cash, Bischoff mentions working in his office during his time in the AWA when he had heard a legitimate fight outside of his door. He said he had looked up just in time to see wrestler The Sheik's head come breaking through the wall. He said despite this, the Sheik continued the fight while a stunned Bischoff looked on.

=== World Championship Wrestling (1991–2001) ===
==== Arrival and ascent to power (1991–1996) ====
In 1991, Bischoff joined World Championship Wrestling (WCW) as a C-show announcer, recognized by many as “B-dawg on the C-show”, debuting at The Great American Bash. As an announcer, Bischoff reported to producer Tony Schiavone and WCW's Vice President of Broadcasting, Jim Ross. In 1993, after WCW Vice President of Wrestling Operations and marketing Bill Watts resigned from WCW, Bischoff went to TBS executive and WCW President Bill Shaw and WCW Executive Vice President Bob Dhue to apply for the job of Executive Producer. Ross and Schiavone seemed to be the two top candidates, however, Bischoff was hired in Watts's place. Schiavone remained a producer and commentator until WCW's demise, but Ross was granted his release from WCW and went to work for the WWF. Initially, Bischoff and Dhue worked together as partners, but frequently clashed over the direction of WCW.

In 1994, Bischoff was promoted from Executive Producer to Senior Vice President, putting him in charge of everything WCW. Dhue resigned, as did event manager Don Sandefeur and junior vice president Jim Barnett. Bischoff convinced Turner executives to better finance WCW in order to compete with the WWF. He moved WCW production to Disney-MGM Studios in Orlando, Florida. Hulk Hogan, who was filming a show called Thunder in Paradise at Disney-MGM Studios, was approached by Bischoff and Ric Flair and signed to a contract with WCW. He also invested money in production values and increased the number of WCW pay-per-views (first seven a year, then 10, and then once a month). He also started a weekly live program on TNT, WCW Monday Nitro, that went directly against WWF's flagship Monday Night Raw. Bischoff remained an announcer on Nitro, regularly spoiling Raw results (as the latter show was not always aired live) to boost ratings. This created what became known amongst fans as the Monday Night War, as both WCW and WWF fought for viewers and in the process kick-started a new level of mainstream popularity for pro wrestling. The changes paid off, and in 1995, WCW turned a profit for the first time in WCW's history. By 1997, Bischoff's official job title was President of World Championship Wrestling.

==== New World Order (1996–1998) ====
In 1996, Bischoff signed WWF superstar Scott Hall, better known at the time as "Razor Ramon". Two weeks later on Nitro, Hall was joined by Kevin Nash, most previously known as "Diesel" in the WWF, to become "The Outsiders". Bischoff intentionally depicted the duo as WWF rebels who were not under contract to WCW. To avoid legal action by the WWF, Bischoff in a worked interview at The Great American Bash, asked point blank if they worked for the WWF, which both Hall and Nash denied. The Outsiders expanded and became the New World Order (nWo) when perennial fan-favorite Hulk Hogan aligned himself with the Outsiders in July 1996.

The nWo was depicted as a rival company engaging in a "hostile takeover" of WCW. Week to week, the angle grew more complex, with a mixture of main-eventers, mid-carders, executives, referees, managers, and announcers involved in various subplots related to the onscreen "WCW vs nWo" power-struggle. Led by the nWo storyline, WCW overtook the WWF as the number one wrestling promotion in America with Nitro defeating Raw in the ratings by a wide margin for 83 consecutive weeks. During this era, Bischoff moved from his role as commentator and joined the nWo as a manager. His television character, dubbed "Eazy E" by Hall ("Sleazy E" by the WCW commentators), became a dictator and egomaniac as the nWo boss. In the summer of 1998, Bischoff hosted a Tonight Show like segment on WCW programming with Miss Elizabeth. Ted DiBiase has said in shoot interviews that Bischoff originally hired DiBiase to be the spokesperson and financial backer for the nWo, but when the nWo was getting to be a more prominent storyline, Bischoff replaced DiBiase as nWo spokesperson.

==== Downfall of WCW (1998–1999) ====
When the WWF rebranded their product as "WWF Attitude" and began to focus on new superstars such as Stone Cold Steve Austin, Mick Foley, and The Rock, and made owner/longtime announcer Vince McMahon into a character, this eventually resulted in a ratings turnaround for the WWF. On April 13, 1998, the WWF ended WCW's year and a half run on top of the ratings war. Despite losing in the ratings to the WWF, WCW continued to post strong ratings, attendance, and PPV buyrates throughout 1998. In 1998, WCW built one of its most popular homegrown superstars in Bill Goldberg, and gave him the WCW World Heavyweight Championship on July 6, 1998, at the Georgia Dome in front of 39,919 people on Nitro.

In late 1998 he feuded with Ric Flair. Bischoff defeated Flair at Starrcade and the next night lost to Flair on Nitro.

In early 1999, Bischoff promoted Kevin Nash to head booker. Despite Goldberg drawing at the box office and doing three shows in December and January that did nearly a $1 million gate, the decision was made to end Goldberg's undefeated streak and put the belt on Nash. On the January 4 Nitro, at the Georgia Dome, Nash dropped the title to Hogan in a match that became known as the Fingerpoke of Doom, and the nWo was rebranded. By March ratings began dropping, and WCW began experiencing an endless streak of ratings losses.

Throughout 1999, Bischoff reverted to focusing on aging WCW stars such as Hogan, Diamond Dallas Page, Randy Savage, Sting, Rowdy Roddy Piper, Nash, Ric Flair, and Sid Vicious. In an effort to improve ratings, WCW also began to focus heavily on several celebrities such as Master P., Chad Brock, Megadeth, Dennis Rodman, and Kiss. One of the last deals Bischoff structured was a deal with the members of the rock band Kiss to have their own wrestling character known as The Kiss Demon.

By late 1999, WCW began losing around $5 million a month. Attendance, PPV buys and ratings were down significantly. On September 10, 1999, the decision was made to relieve Bischoff of power.

==== Replacement (1999–2000) ====
On September 10, 1999, Bischoff was relieved of his management position with WCW by Turner Sports chief Harvey Schiller. The job title "President of WCW" was eliminated. He was replaced with WCW Vice President of Strategic Planning Bill Busch, who was named Senior Vice President (handling the creative side of the company with Brad Siegel handling the day-to-day operations). One of Busch's first acts in charge was the additions of former WWF head writer Vince Russo and his colleague Ed Ferrara (both of whom had worked on Raw when the show began to overtake Nitro in the ratings) to head up WCW's creative direction.

In April 2000, Bischoff returned as an on-air character alongside Russo to lead the heel faction The New Blood; Bischoff also worked on writing the shows with Russo during this time. He defeated Terry Funk for the WCW Hardcore Championship on June 6. Bischoff's last on-camera role in WCW was on the June 12, 2000 Nitro. He would exit WCW in July 2000 at Bash at the Beach, when Russo did a worked-shoot promo on Hulk Hogan.

==== Attempted purchase of WCW (2001) ====
On January 11, 2001, with WCW facing major financial woes, Siegel accepted Bischoff's offer to purchase WCW. Bischoff and Fusient briefly withdrew their offer when the WWF made an inquiry on WCW (due to the terms of a settlement, WWF had a right to bid on WCW's properties, should they ever be up for liquidation). When then-WWF broadcaster Viacom objected (fearing a WWF-owned show on a competing network), the Bischoff-Fusient consortium signed a new letter of intent.

However, the new head of Turner Broadcasting, Jamie Kellner then canceled all WCW programming due to losing money for several years from its television networks. WCW lost $60 million in 2000 alone. Kellner believed that wrestling did not fit the demographics of either TBS or TNT and would not be favorable enough to get the "right" advertisers to buy airtime (even though Thunder was the highest-rated show on TBS at the time). In the book NITRO: The Incredible Rise and Inevitable Collapse of Ted Turner's WCW by Guy Evans, it is said that a key condition in WCW's purchase deal with Fusient was that Fusient wanted control over time slots on the TNT and TBS networks, regardless of whether these slots would show WCW programming or not. This influenced Kellner's decision to ultimately cancel WCW programming. With no network on which to air its programming, WCW was of little value to Fusient, whose offer depended on being able to continue to air WCW programming on the Turner networks. Bischoff stated that "it made absolutely no sense for us to do the deal under those circumstances." With WCW programming canceled (and Viacom subsequently no longer objecting), WCW's key assets (tape library, trademarks, and selected contracts) were purchased by the WWF in March 2001 for a substantially lower price (approximately US$3.5 million) than what had been offered.

=== World Wrestling Entertainment (2002–2007) ===
==== General Manager of Raw (2002–2005) ====
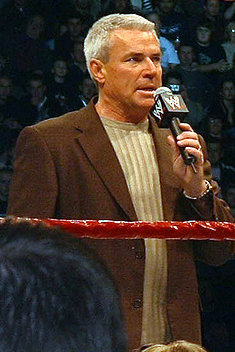
Bischoff during his time with WWE.

In 2002, Bischoff was hired by World Wrestling Entertainment (WWE, formerly WWF) to be the general manager of Raw. Although primarily an on-screen role, Bischoff had a wide range of contacts within WWE to whom he could pitch creative ideas. He debuted as the first Raw general manager on the July 15 episode of Raw. He resurrected his characteristic brand of smarminess with the general manager position, again playing the arrogant heel character he had employed as the nWo boss in WCW. During his debut on Raw, he told the audience about how he was president of WCW, creator of the nWo and how he forced Vince McMahon to change the ways he does business. Bischoff is in second place of the longest reigns as general manager in WWE history, with three years in total. Former rival and former general manager of SmackDown Theodore Long surpassed Bischoff's record with a combined number of six years. Bischoff's wrestling innovations in WWE included the "Raw Roulette" and the Elimination Chamber, as well as feuds with Stone Cold Steve Austin, Shane McMahon, John Cena, SmackDown! general manager Stephanie McMahon, and former Extreme Championship Wrestling (ECW) owner Paul Heyman. On June 15 at Bad Blood, Bischoff appeared during a segment along with Stone Cold Steve Austin and Mae Young where she stripped herself in the ring and shared a passionate kiss with Eric Bischoff and performed a bronco buster on Bischoff before being stunned by Austin. At Taboo Tuesday, Bischoff had his head shaved after failing to beat his (kayfabe) nephew Eugene. Bischoff then began a face turn after his head got shaved. He favored face wrestlers such as Randy Orton, Chris Benoit and Chris Jericho. By the end of 2004, Bischoff subsequently took a vacation after allowing Randy Orton's Survivor Series team to become general managers for up to four weeks with every member being the general manager once a week.

On the May 16, 2005 episode of Raw, Bischoff began a vendetta against an impending ECW revival, turning heel once again in the process. Bischoff later began a feud with John Cena (who was drafted to Raw in the 2005 WWE Draft Lottery), for Cena's refusal to "play politics" in regards to the Anti-ECW Crusade and citing disdain for Cena's rapping and "thug nature". Bischoff made wrestlers such as Chris Jericho, Christian and Kurt Angle try to take the WWE Championship away from Cena. Following several months of Raw and SmackDown! invasions, Bischoff lost to SmackDown! general manager Theodore Long at Survivor Series after The Boogeyman helped Long beat Bischoff.

On the December 5 episode of Raw, Bischoff was (kayfabe) "fired" as general manager, when Cena body slammed him and Vince McMahon tossed him into a garbage truck – following a "trial" where his history of unscrupulous actions were listed – and had him driven out of the arena. Bischoff then sat out the remainder of the year and spent the start of 2006 writing a book that would become Controversy Creates Cash. Bischoff was against writing a wrestling book initially, as he believes "most are bitter, self-serving revisionist history at best—and monuments to bullshit at their worst."

==== Sporadic appearances and departure (2006–2007) ====
On September 25, 2006, Bischoff appeared on WWE television for the first time in close to a year, and after being brought into the ring by Jonathan Coachman, he proceeded to promote his recently finished book Controversy Creates Cash, giving a worked shoot on McMahon and WWE. During his segment, Bischoff stated, "Without Monday Nitro there would be no Monday Night Raw...without the nWo there would be no DX...and without Eric Bischoff there would be no Mr. McMahon". After this statement, Bischoff's microphone was immediately cut off, Jonathan Coachman's music played and he was escorted from the arena by security.

A few days later John "Bradshaw" Layfield (JBL) conducted a four-part interview with Bischoff, further discussing his book on WWE.com. During the interview, Bischoff discussed various topics, such as his true feelings towards Lex Luger, his thoughts on ECW promoter Paul Heyman, his decision of giving Kevin Nash booking power, and his overall reaction to the Monday Night War. The book was released on October 17, 2006, and became a New York Times best seller.

Bischoff was chosen as the special guest referee for the D-Generation X (DX) versus Rated-RKO match at Cyber Sunday on November 5, with 60% of the vote. He then cheated DX out of the win, leaving Randy Orton and Edge the victors. The next night on Raw, Bischoff was reinstated as General Manager for one night only. During his time as the General Manager on Raw, he restarted matches if he did not like the outcome. He also got revenge on Maria for her statement made in his trial the year before by making her face Umaga, forced John Cena to "take the night off," and banned DX from the building. He restarted the match between Jeff Hardy and Johnny Nitro for the WWE Intercontinental Championship after Hardy won by disqualification. Bischoff restarted that match as a No Disqualification match, and Nitro took advantage of that using Melina to distract Hardy and striking him with the title belt. At the end of the show, DX interfered in the main event when Bischoff tried to help Edge and Randy Orton win the World Tag Team Championship from Ric Flair and Roddy Piper, and forced him to be humiliated by "Big Dick Johnson" as revenge for costing them their match the night before.

On March 5, 2007, Bischoff made a brief appearance on Raw in Phoenix, Arizona to give Vince McMahon his thoughts on the WrestleMania 23 match against Donald Trump. In August 2007, Bischoff's WWE contract expired. On December 10, 2007, Bischoff appeared on Raw for its 15th Anniversary Special, and was confronted by Chris Jericho, the man whom he fired on Raw on August 22, 2005.

=== Total Nonstop Action Wrestling (2010–2014) ===
==== Immortal (2010–2012) ====
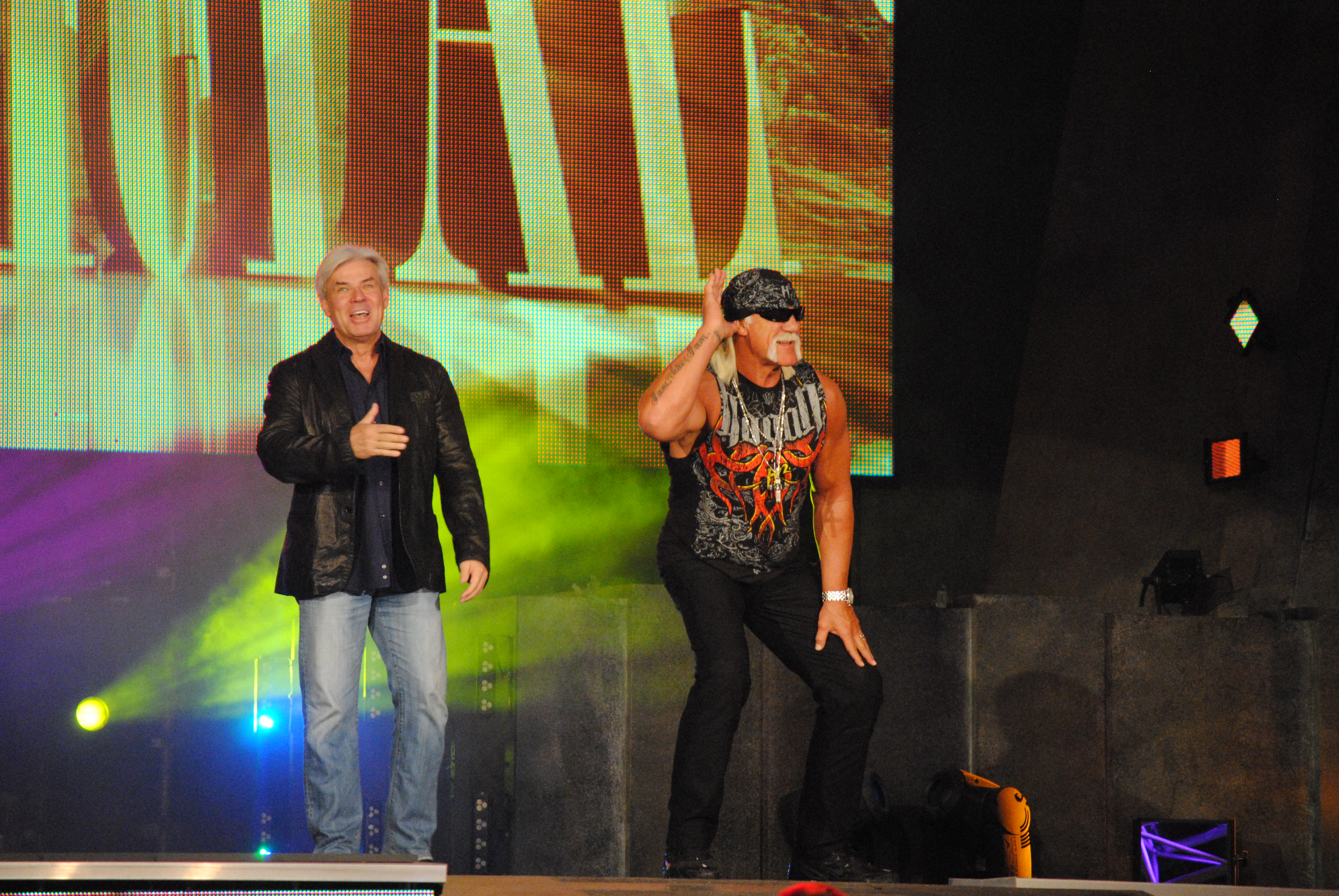
Bischoff's (left) debut in TNA coincided with Hulk Hogan (right) signing with the promotion

In October 2009, Bischoff helped negotiate a deal among Total Nonstop Action Wrestling (TNA), Hulk Hogan, and himself. According to Bischoff, Hogan gave Bischoff the power to sign contracts on his behalf. He pointed that TNA only wanted Hogan, but Hogan wouldn't go to TNA without Bischoff. Bischoff also said that he went with Hogan to oversee his creative. He premiered alongside Hogan on the January 4, 2010, episode of Impact! as part of an alliance to take over and rebuild the franchise. Behind the scenes, he was also appointed TNA executive producer.

Despite being a heel when dealing with the likes of Jeff Jarrett, Mick Foley and Abyss, Bischoff refereed his first TNA match at Against All Odds, favoring the face challenger Samoa Joe over the heel champion A.J. Styles in a match for the TNA World Heavyweight Championship. During the match, as part of the storyline, Bischoff punched out Styles's manager Ric Flair, after he interfered in the match, but the distraction led to Styles retaining his belt. On the March 15 episode of Impact!, Bischoff attempted to shave Foley bald as a punishment for trying to help Jarrett in a handicap match the previous week, but was shaved bald himself, when Foley turned the tables on him. At Lockdown, Bischoff turned face by helping Team Hogan defeat Team Flair in the Lethal Lockdown match. The next months Bischoff worked with Hogan, Jeff Jarrett and Samoa Joe against Sting and Kevin Nash, who claimed that they knew that Bischoff and Hogan were up to something. During this time, Abyss turned on Hogan and went on a rampage, which included attacking the TNA World Heavyweight Champion Rob Van Dam to the point that he was forced to vacate the title, all the while claiming that he was controlled by some entity, that was coming to TNA. After he manhandled TNA president Dixie Carter on the October 7 episode of Impact!, Bischoff presented Carter with the paperwork that would have Abyss fired after his match with Van Dam at Bound for Glory, which she then proceeded to sign.

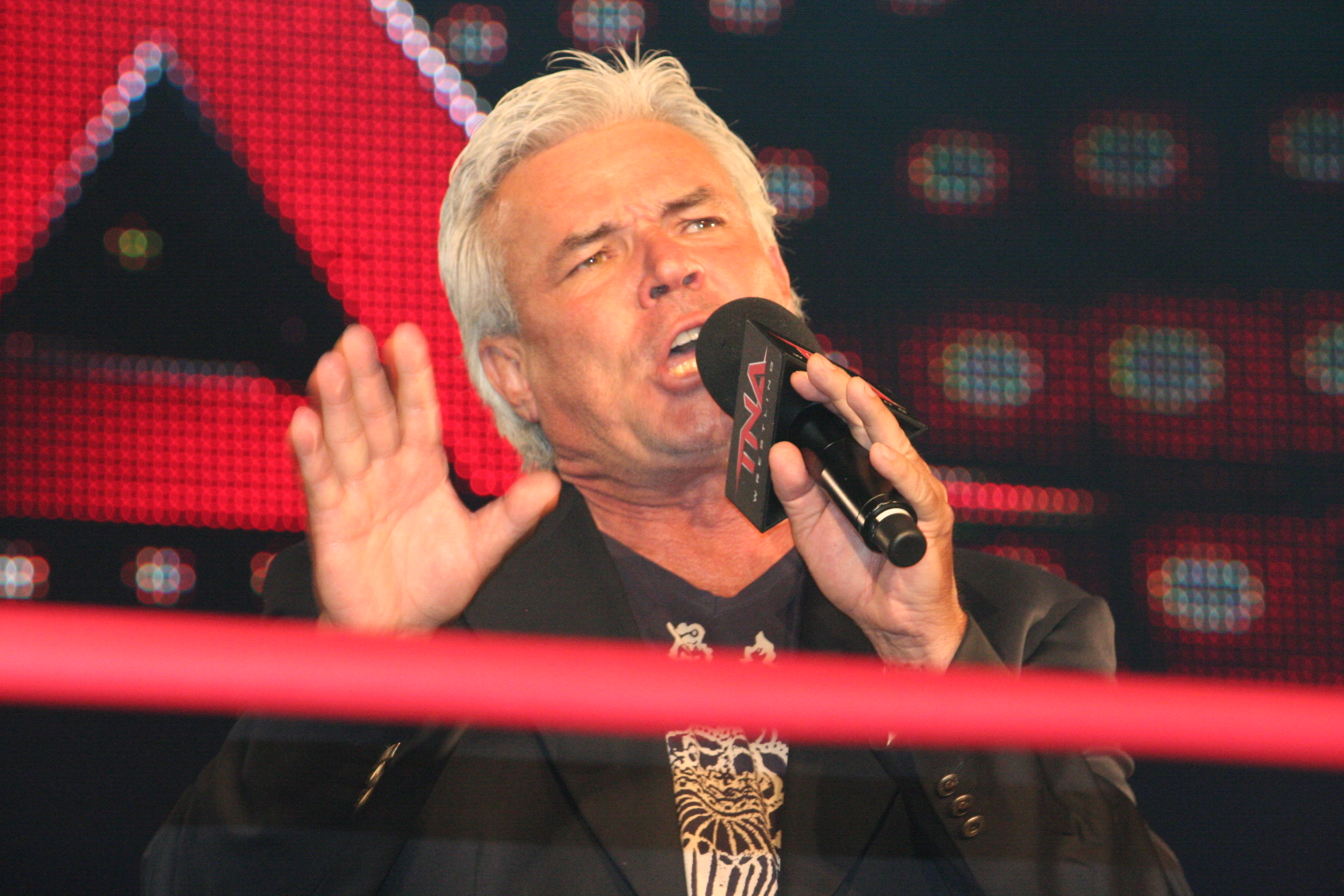
Bischoff at a TNA event in July 2010

At Bound for Glory, Bischoff turned heel with Hogan, as the two of them helped Jeff Hardy win the vacant TNA World Heavyweight Championship. Bischoff, Hogan and Hardy then aligned themselves with Abyss and Jarrett. On the following episode of Impact! it was revealed that Bischoff had tricked Carter and the paperwork she had signed a week earlier, were not to release Abyss, but to turn the company over to him and Hogan. Meanwhile, Bischoff's and Hogan's new stable, now known as Immortal, formed an alliance with Flair's Fortune stable. On the November 4 episode of Impact!, Bischoff took part in his first match in TNA, challenging the concussed Mr. Anderson to earn his shot at the TNA World Heavyweight Championship, only for Matt Morgan to take his spot and beat Bischoff to become the number one contender. Carter returned on the November 25 episode of Reaction, informing Hogan and Bischoff that a judge had filed an injunction against the two on her behalf over not having signatory authority, indefinitely suspending Hogan from TNA. On January 31, 2011, at the tapings of the February 3 episode of Impact!, Fortune turned on Immortal, explaining that they were not going to let TNA suffer the same fate as WCW. Hogan, having won the court battle against Carter, returned to TNA on the March 3 episode of Impact!, declaring himself as the new owner of the promotion.

However, on the May 12 episode of the newly renamed Impact Wrestling, Immortal lost control of the program to Foley, who revealed himself as the Network consultant, and had been causing problems for Immortal ever since Bischoff and Hogan took over the company. However, this angle was aborted just three weeks later, when Foley left the promotion. Also in May, Bischoff declared war on the X Division, after the legitimate firing of Jay Lethal, and on the May 19 episode of Impact Wrestling, wrestled his second TNA match, when he teamed with Matt Hardy in a tag team match, where they defeated Generation Me (Jeremy and Max Buck). The storyline concluded on August 11, when the Network gave the division back to the original X Division wrestlers, after the success of Destination X, which saw Immortal's Abyss lose the TNA X Division Championship to Brian Kendrick. On October 6, it was reported that Bischoff had signed a contract extension with TNA. On October 16 at Bound for Glory, after losing control of TNA back to Carter, Hogan turned on the rest of Immortal by saving Sting from a beatdown at the hands of its members. Sting had won the match when referee Jackson James, who had earlier in the event been revealed as Bischoff's real-life son Garett Bischoff, reluctantly called the ring bell for a submission, which led to Eric hitting his son with a steel chair following the match, starting a rivalry between the two. On April 15, 2012, at Lockdown, Eric and Garett captained opposing teams in the annual Lethal Lockdown match. Garett won the match for his team by pinning Eric, forcing his father out of TNA in the process.

==== Backstage roles, lawsuit and departure (2012–2014) ====
After Lockdown, Bischoff did not appear on Impact Wrestling and focused on his backstage roles. In October 2013, Bischoff was sent home by TNA to sit out the remainder of his contract, which expired in early 2014. In May 2015, Bischoff, his son Garett, and his business partner Jason Hervey sued TNA for unpaid salary. During an interview in August 2016, when Bischoff was asked what went wrong with TNA he said: "I try to put them both out of my mind so I couldn't tell you. No comment. I'm in the middle of a lawsuit with them so I can't really comment." When asked about positive memories during his time with TNA he stated that he did not have any. In 2019, Bischoff said of his TNA run, "For the most part, it is very regrettable" and "looking back, I wished I wouldn't have done it, with one or two exceptions."

=== Sporadic WWE appearances (2016–present) ===
Bischoff inducted Diamond Dallas Page into the WWE Hall of Fame. On the 25th Anniversary of Raw on January 22, 2018, Bischoff made a guest appearance on the show, during a segment with other former Raw general managers and on July 22, 2019, on the Raw Reunion.

In June 2019, WWE announced that Bischoff would be the executive director of SmackDown, and part of Bischoff's role is to act as an intermediary between WWE and Fox executives due to his background in the television industry, but he was replaced on October 15 by Bruce Prichard, and with immediate effect he had left WWE. Bryan Alvarez reported that he heard "zero good things" about Bischoff and that Bischoff did not know the product nor the wrestlers. According to Fox, Bischoff was released since "[s]ignificant promises were made that we don't feel were upheld".

In March 2020, Bischoff reflected on his WWE departure, stating "I knew about six weeks in, eight weeks in, it just wasn't going to work out. [...] I knew I wasn't fitting and it wasn't a secret. [...] It just wasn't right. [...] I had to fit in the system and I wasn't able to do it in the timeline it needed to be done". In June 2020, Bischoff further reflected on his departure by saying "it was on me" and backs his profession by blaming his failure to adapt to the new job for why his tenure was so short and described the problem as being more of a "chemistry issue" than anything else. Bischoff also pointed out that he had little creative control over SmackDown but was more of an overseer for Vince, who had the most say in WWE's creative direction at the time.

On April 6, 2021, he was inducted into the WWE Hall of Fame. He also appeared on the December 27 episode of Raw, as the officiator for the renewal of The Miz and Maryse's vows, and on the January 21, 2022 episode of SmackDown, during a backstage segment with Adam Pearce and Sonya Deville.

Bischoff appeared via a video on the November 26, 2024 episode of NXT to speak to Trick Williams and Ridge Holland. Bischoff appeared live in person on the December 4 episode of NXT, praising the brand and its potential and again talking with Trick Williams and Ridge Holland.

=== All Elite Wrestling (2020–2021) ===
On the August 5, 2020 episode of Dynamite, Bischoff appeared on TNT for the first time since 2000, when he moderated a debate between Chris Jericho and Orange Cassidy. He referred to his appearance as a cameo and he has not signed with All Elite Wrestling. However, on the October 28 episode, Bischoff would later return to Dynamite to ask Jericho and MJF questions during a "town hall meeting", provoking the two wrestlers and setting up a match at Full Gear. On the March 3, 2021 episode of Dynamite, he appeared as part of an Inner Circle press conference. On the May 28 episode, Bischoff returned to Dynamite to host a party for the Inner Circle. During the event, members of the Inner Circle were ambushed by MJF and others in The Pinnacle.

== Television production career ==
Bischoff, with actor Jason Hervey, ran his own production company, Bischoff Hervey Entertainment, which primarily produced reality TV shows, through 2017. They produced a live Girls Gone Wild pay-per-view event from Florida in 2003 with WWE and another pay-per-view about the Sturgis, South Dakota motorcycle rally in 2004. They also executive produced the VH1 reality shows Scott Baio Is 45...and Single, Scott Baio Is 46...and Pregnant, I Want To Be a Hilton, and Confessions of a Teen Idol, along with the CMT show Billy Ray Cyrus...Home At Last. Bischoff-Hervey Productions also produced a wrestling reality show called Hulk Hogan's Celebrity Championship Wrestling in which ten celebrities were trained to wrestle and one celebrity is voted off weekly. Bischoff also appeared as one of the "judges" on the show. In November 2009, Bischoff helped produce Hulk Hogan's Hulkamania: Let The Battle Begin tour to Australia. Bischoff, also had a show in development with Food Network called "Food Fight" where pro wrestlers take on celebrity chefs in cooking and then tag-team with them in a wrestling match. In January 2013, Bischoff and Hervey produced the television series Hardcore Pawn: Chicago.

== Video game production career ==
In 2013, along with partners Jason Hervey and Ike McFadden, Bischoff formed the online gaming company MX Digital. The company develops and distributes online and mobile celebrity-themed games in Europe and North America. Among the company's first released games were Hulk Hogan's Hulkamania, which debuted on SkyVegas in November 2012. Their next game, The Hoff, featuring actor-singer David Hasselhoff, was released widely in Europe in February 2013.

In early 2014, his online-gaming company announced a deal with actor Dan Aykroyd to launch a Blues Brothers online casino game in Europe. Later that year, MX Digital launched their games on Facebook, under the moniker "MX Casino". Slot-machine-style games playable upon launch as a Facebook app included "socialized" versions of Hulk Hogan's Hulkamania, as well as a similarly Facebook-friendly version of The Hoff. Also debuting in October of that year were a batch of new celebrity-themed games, this time starring the likes of Dennis Rodman, James Dean and Chuck Norris.

== Personal life ==
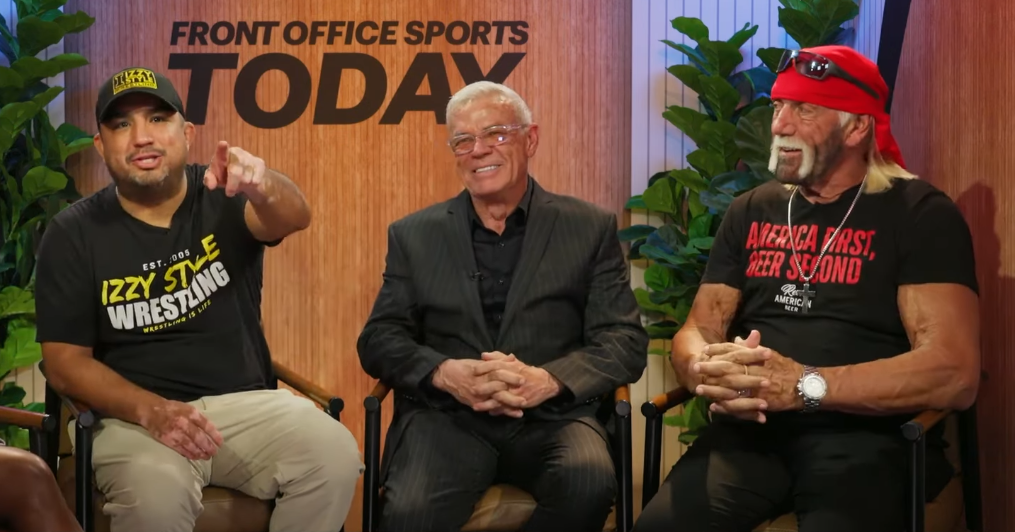
RAF COO Izzy Martinez (left), CMO Eric Bischoff, and co-founder Hulk Hogan during their May 2025 press tour

Bischoff currently resides in Cody, Wyoming with his wife, Loree (married since 1984). Bischoff has previously lived in Scottsdale, Arizona; Stamford, Connecticut; and Los Angeles, California. He has two children: son Garett (born April 20, 1984); and daughter Montanna (born November 7, 1985). Garett, under the ring name Jackson James, made his debut for TNA Wrestling on November 7, 2010, as a referee at Turning Point, before later becoming a wrestler under his real name.

On May 5, 2011, Eric Bischoff announced that he was starting a brewing company in Cody, Wyoming. Their first beverage, called Buffalo Bill Cody Beer, featured the tag line "The Spirit of the Wild West".

On July 27, 2016, Bischoff premiered his first podcast show, Bischoff on Wrestling, on MLW Radio. After October 17, 2017, he quit the show due to being shortchanged on money. In April 2018, Bischoff returned to podcasting with 83 Weeks with Eric Bischoff alongside co-host, Conrad Thompson.

Bischoff helped launch Real American Freestyle (RAF) on April 30, 2025, and currently serves as their chief media officer.

Bischoff is a longtime fan of Vermont-based jamband Phish and collects live recordings of their concerts.

== Legacy ==
Bischoff is one of the most polarizing and controversial figures in professional wrestling history. He was instrumental in the creation of the New World Order, which played a major role in WCW's success and peak during the Monday Night War. Mike Johnson of Pro Wrestling Insider wrote: "His place in history is this and it will always be this - he's the only person to come along and kick Vince McMahon hard enough that he forced WWF's product to evolve and get better. No matter whether he won the ratings for 83 weeks or one week, his legacy is that he made pro wrestling change for the better in the mid-1990s." However, R.D. Reynolds and Bryan Alvarez, the authors of the book titled The Death of WCW, were critical of many of the decisions Bischoff made as head of WCW and believe that he contributed to the decline of WCW. Despite their criticisms, Reynolds attributes the death of WCW to have been the result of decisions made by Jamie Kellner.

Although critical of the time that they spent working together in WCW and TNA, Vince Russo said Bischoff has "contributed [to professional wrestling] in a tremendous way ... dating all the way back to his early days at the AWA". AEW promoter Tony Khan credits Bischoff with paving the way for his promotion, stating: "I wouldn't be here and there would not be an AEW without [Bischoff] and there would not be wrestling on TNT right now without [him]." WWE describes Bischoff as a "pioneer behind the scenes in sports-entertainment, as well as an incredibly entertaining performer in front of the camera", further stating that he achieved "success everywhere he went in the business".

== Filmography ==
=== Television ===
Year	Title	Role	Notes
2016	Eric Bischoff: Sports Entertainment's Most Controversial Figure	Himself	Documentary about his career
2021	Rhodes To The Top	Himself	
2024	Who Killed WCW?	Himself	
2024	Mr. McMahon	Himself	

== Championships and accomplishments ==
- George Tragos/Lou Thesz Professional Wrestling Hall of Fame
  - Jack Brisco Spotlight Award 2025
- Pro Wrestling Illustrated
  - Feud of the Year (1996) vs. Vince McMahon
  - Feud of the Year (2002) vs. Stephanie McMahon
- World Championship Wrestling
  - WCW Hardcore Championship (1 time)
- Wrestling Observer Newsletter
  - Best Gimmick (1996) – nWo
  - Feud of the Year (1996) New World Order vs. World Championship Wrestling
  - Best Non-Wrestler (2005)
- WWE
  - WWE Hall of Fame (Class of 2021)

Preceded by Inaugural	WCW Nitro lead announcer 1995–1996	Succeeded by Tony Schiavone
