= Hulk Hogan's Celebrity Championship Wrestling =

2008 American reality television series

- Directed by: Brian Smith
- Starring: Hulk Hogan
- Country of origin: United States
- No. of seasons: 1
- No. of episodes: 8

Production
- Producers: Eric Bischoff; Jason Hervey; Hulk Hogan; Brian Smith

Original release
- Network: CMT
- Release: October 18 – December 6, 2008

Hulk Hogan's Celebrity Championship Wrestling is an American reality television series that aired on CMT from October 18 to December 6, 2008. In Australia, it premiered in July 2009 on the FOX8 channel. It was also shown in the UK on Bravo and Viva. It was co-produced by Hulk Hogan and Bischoff-Hervey Entertainment. It featured celebrities being trained to become professional wrestlers. The finale aired on December 6, when Dennis Rodman was declared the winner.

== Cast ==
=== Judges ===
- Hulk Hogan – Hogan held multiple championships in his career during his tenures in the WWF/WWE and WCW, and was inducted into the WWE Hall of Fame in 2005. Additionally is known for his acting outside of the wrestling area and serves as the host, creator and executive producer (the latter two duties credit him as "Terry Bollea") of the series. He is the main judge and dismisses the eliminated contenders in the competition by declaring "You're a jabroni, get out of my ring!". Hulk Hogan died on July 24, 2025 aged 71.
- Eric Bischoff – Known for being the Executive Producer and later President of WCW and an occasional on-air personality during his tenures with both the original WCW and WWF/E. He appeared as an announcer, a member of Hogan's nWo faction in WCW and as the general manager of the WWE Raw brand. Bischoff is also credited as creator and executive producer of the series alongside business partner Jason Hervey and Hogan.
- Jimmy Hart – In-ring manager who worked for several different promotions including WWF/E, WCW, TNA, and others. Best known to fans as the "Mouth of the South" with his signature megaphone, he accompanied several wrestling stars like Hulk Hogan to the ring as manager.

=== Other ===
The trainers included Brutus "The Barber" Beefcake, Brian Knobbs (who are best friends of Hogan), and Tom Howard. Bubba the Love Sponge was the special commentator.

Former professional wrestlers also made special appearances in the series. Bill Goldberg, a film actor and former WCW World Heavyweight Champion and WWE World Heavyweight Champion, guest starred in the sixth episode. Rob Van Dam, a former ECW World Heavyweight Champion and WWE Champion, guest starred in the fifth episode.

=== Contestants ===
Name	Elimination #	Elimination week
Todd Bridges	9	8
Trishelle Cannatella	5	6
Dustin Diamond	7	8
Danny Bonaduce	6	7
Eric Esch	8	8
Erin Murphy	3	3
Dennis Rodman	Winner	
Frank Stallone	2	2
Tiffany Darwish	1	1
Nikki Ziering	4	4

Bonaduce was originally eliminated in week 5 because of an injury, but he was brought back in week 6. He was later eliminated in week 7.

== Episode recaps ==
=== Week 1 ===
Team Nasty	Faces (Erin Murphy and Dennis Rodman) def. Heels (Frank Stallone and Dustin Diamond) with Nikki Ziering
Team Beefcake	Faces (Trishelle Cannatella and Butterbean) def. Heels (Tiffany and Danny Bonaduce) with Todd Bridges

The moves learned were the forearm smash, clothesline, and a kick to the midsection. Team Nasty won the match.

=== Week 2 ===
Team Beefcake	Heels (Trishelle Cannatella and Danny Bonaduce) def. Faces (Todd Bridges and Butterbean)
Team Nasty	Heels (Erin Murphy and Dustin Diamond) def. Faces (Nikki Ziering and Frank Stallone) with Dennis Rodman

In week two, the moves learned by the celebrities included the headlock take down, schoolboy pin, and shoulder tackle. Originally, Dennis Rodman was going to wrestle for Team Nasty, with Stallone managing. During practice, however, Rodman injured his arm attempting a flying clothesline on Coach Nasty. Team Beefcake won the match.

=== Week 3 ===
Gimmick
Butterbean	One Mean Bean
Danny Bonaduce	"Dangerous" Danny Bonaduce
Todd Bridges	Mr. Not So Perfect
Trishelle Cannatella	Red Hot Redneck
Dustin Diamond	The Winner
Erin Murphy	Mistress of Mayhem (M.O.M.)
Dennis Rodman	Rodzilla
Nikki Ziering	Candy Girl

Team Nasty	Faces (The Mistress of Mayhem [Erin Murphy] and Rodzilla [Dennis Rodman]) def. Heels (Candy Girl [Nikki Ziering] and The Winner [Dustin Diamond])
Team Beefcake	Faces (Red Hot Redneck [Trishelle Cannatella] and "Dangerous" Danny Bonaduce) def. Heels (Mr. Not So Perfect [Todd Bridges] and Mean Bean [Butterbean])

The basic tie up, as well as the techniques for working the arm and working the ropes, were the moves of the week. The challenge in week three was for the individual celebrities to create for themselves a gimmick, which is a character or persona. Team Beefcake won the match.

=== Week 4 ===
Team Beefcake	Heels (Mean Bean and Red Hot Redneck) def. Faces ("Dangerous" Danny Bonaduce and Mr. Not So Perfect)
Team Nasty	Face (Rodzilla) def. Heels (Candy Girl and The Winner)

The moves learned included the hip toss, taking the turnbuckle, and the elbow smash. The two teams tied for best match.

=== Week 5 ===
Finishing moves
Dennis Rodman (Rodzilla)	Diving clothesline
Butterbean (Mean Bean)	Powerslam
Trishelle Cannatella (Red Hot Redneck)	Inverted STF
Todd Bridges (Mr. Not So Perfect)	Diving sunset flip
Dustin Diamond (The Winner)	DDT

5-person battle royal	Red Hot Redneck def. Mean Bean, Rodzilla, The Winner and Mr. Not So Perfect

In week five, the celebrities learned the "Over the Top" and "Duck and Boost" techniques. They also created their own finishing moves. "Dangerous" Danny Bonaduce was going to be in the match, but he had to withdraw due to an injury he sustained during practice. The two teams merged into one team, Team Hogan.

=== Week 6 ===
Hardcore tornado tag team match	Red Hot Redneck and Rodzilla def. Mean Bean and Mr. Not So Perfect
Falls Count anywhere grudge match	The Winner def. "Dangerous" Danny Bonaduce

The celebrities learned how to hit the head, back, and gut of their opponents with weapons (Trash cans, chairs, etc.) in week six. Danny Bonaduce returned because his injury was not as bad as originally thought. Because he was not eliminated face-to-face, Hogan allowed him to return.

=== Week 7 ===
Triple Threat match	The Winner defeats Mr. Not So Perfect and "Dangerous" Danny Bonaduce
No-Disqualification match	Mean Bean defeats Rodzilla

The last three professional wrestling moves were taught to the celebrities in week seven. The three moves of the week were the arm drag, basic chop, and body slam.

=== Week 8 ===
Tag team match	Rodzilla and Mr. Not So Perfect defeat The Winner and Mean Bean
CCW Championship	Rodzilla defeats Mr. Not So Perfect

In week eight, there were four remaining contestants. Diamond and Butterbean were eliminated after the tag team event. Bridges was eliminated in the final episode after the final main event. Dennis Rodman was declared the winner and the first CCW Champion.
