= Confessions of a Teen Idol =

- Created by: Michael Swerdlick
- Developed by: Jason Hervey; Eric Bischoff; Scott Baio; Michael Swerdlick
- Directed by: Rich Kim
- Presented by: Scott Baio; Jason Hervey
- Country of origin: United States
- No. of episodes: 8

Production
- Executive producers: Eric Bischoff; Michael Swerdlick; Scott Baio; For VH1: Jill Holmes; Noah Pollack; Alex Demyanenko; Jeff Olde
- Cinematography: Guido Frenzel
- Editors: Ian Kaufman; David Dooyun Kim; Dan Reed
- Running time: 60 minutes (including commercials)

Original release
- Network: VH1
- Release: January 4 – February 22, 2009

Confessions of a Teen Idol is an American reality television series that began airing on VH1 on January 4, 2009 and concluded on February 22, 2009. It ran for eight episodes. The series was hosted and produced by former teen idols Scott Baio and Jason Hervey. The show was filmed in the same house used to film The Real World: Hollywood.

== Synopsis ==
The series chronicles the current careers of seven former teen idols and their attempts to get back into the limelight.

== Cast ==
- Christopher Atkins (47) – most notable for his roles in The Blue Lagoon, The Pirate Movie and A Night in Heaven & Dallas
- David Chokachi (41) – most notable for his role in the TV series Baywatch
- Billy Hufsey (50) – most notable for his role in the TV series Fame
- Jeremy Jackson (28) – most notable for his role in Baywatch as the son of David Hasselhoff's character
- Eric Nies (37) – most notable for his role in the first season of the TV reality show The Real World and as the host of The Grind
- Jamie Walters (39) – most notable for his #1 single "How Do You Talk to an Angel" and his role in the TV series Beverly Hills, 90210
- Adrian Zmed (54) – most notable for his roles in the TV series T. J. Hooker and in the movies Bachelor Party and Grease 2
- Dr. Cooper Lawrence – Fame Expert/Therapist on the show and Author of The Cult of Celebrity

== Episodes ==
No.	Title	Original release date
1	"Episode 1"	January 4, 2009
2	"Episode 2"	January 11, 2009
3	"Episode 3"	January 18, 2009
4	"Episode 4"	January 25, 2009
5	"Episode 5"	February 1, 2009
6	"Episode 6"	February 8, 2009
7	"Episode 7"	February 15, 2009
8	"Episode 8: Finale"	February 22, 2009
