= Beverly Hills Fabulous =

- Genre: Documentary
- Starring: Elgin Charles
- Country of origin: United States
- Original language: English
- No. of seasons: 1
- No. of episodes: 10

Production
- Executive producers: Alex Avant; Eric Bischoff; Jason Hervey; Jeff Olde; Jill Holmes; Noah Pollack
- Producer: Bischoff Hervey Entertainment
- Running time: 20 to 22 minutes

Original release
- Network: VH1
- Release: March 14 – May 16, 2011

Beverly Hills Fabulous is an American reality documentary television series on VH1 that debuted on March 14, 2011, and ran for only one season.

== Premise ==
Beverly Hills Fabulous follows the daily operations of Elgin Charles Salon located in Beverly Hills, California. The salon is owned and operated by the "Emperor of Hair", Elgin Charles.

== Cast ==
- Elgin Charles
- Sean Cameron
- Katrina Atkinson
- Lolita "Lo" Goods

== Episodes ==
No.	Title	Original release date	US viewers (millions)
1	"Sean's Assistant"	March 14, 2011	0.72
2	"Elgin's Product Line"	March 21, 2011	0.62
3	"Giving Back"	March 28, 2011	0.63
4	"Hey Hey! It's Jackée"	April 4, 2011	0.76
5	"Welcome To Miami"	April 11, 2011	0.91
6	"Too Much Infomercial"	April 18, 2011	0.67
7	"New Blood"	April 25, 2011	1.02
8	"Pandora's Weave"	May 2, 2011	1.16
9	"Face the Music"	May 9, 2011	0.50
10	"Sean's Secret"	May 16, 2011	0.97
