= I Want to Be a Hilton =

US television program

- Kathy Hilton with the contestants
- Genre: Game show
- Created by: Jason Hervey
- Presented by: Kathy Hilton
- Country of origin: United States
- No. of seasons: 1
- No. of episodes: 8

Production
- Production company: Bischoff/Hervey Entertainment

Original release
- Network: NBC
- Release: June 21 – August 9, 2005

I Want to Be a Hilton is a 2005 weekly NBC reality television series that was hosted by Kathy Hilton.

The show featured people who "Wanted to be like a Hilton." The finalist of the competition receives a prize package that includes a $200,000 trust fund, a new apartment, wardrobe and the opportunity to get to know the Hiltons.

They resided at a fancy New York City hotel and were divided into two teams, "Park" and "Madison". In each episode, they were required to perform certain tasks, ranging from dog grooming, a fashion show, and organizing a charity event, while learning etiquette and manners. As they competed, Hilton guided them through a variety of challenges that cover subjects ranging from art and culture to beauty and fashion. Hilton met with the losing team at the end of each episode and eliminated one contestant with the catchphrase, "You're not on the list."

The show was originally entitled The Good Life, to tie it in to Paris Hilton's reality show The Simple Life. The show was not renewed for a second season.

== Contestants ==
1. Alain "Alan" Constantine, a 34-year-old perfume salesman from Los Angeles, CA. Originally from Romania, Alan currently works at Bloomingdale's as a fragrance manager and one day hopes to open his own cosmetic shop. Alan remains close to his family as they all reside in the same apartment building. He travels to Las Vegas often because of the shopping, shows, and gambling. If not in Las Vegas, Alan can be found running on the beaches in LA or at the gym.
2. Ann Poonkasem, a 28-year-old former Miss Tampa from Plant City, FL. Ann is a professional singer, model, and television host. The former Miss Tampa USA attends the University of South Florida as a graduate student, pursuing a communications degree. Throughout her life she has volunteered for various organizations and most recently participated in an event to benefit the tsunami relief. Ann is currently working on new projects for the Tampa Bay Performing Arts Center.
3. Brenden Martin, a 31-year-old golf caddie from Denver, CO. One class separates Brenden from his degree in broadcasting from the Metropolitan State College of Denver. Brenden's main occupation takes place during the summer, where he caddies for the elite members of the prestigious Castle Pines Golf Club, in Castle Rock, CO. The youngest of three, he is the quintessential outdoorsman, and enjoys golfing, skiing, rock climbing, and backpacking.
4. Jabe Robinson, a 26-year-old ranch hand from Joshua, TX. A charming construction worker who installs septic tanks, Jabe has an assortment of pets including goats, turtles, and a donkey named Hank. A true southern gentleman, this hunky bachelor is quite the ladies' man. As the owner of a construction company he rarely gets a moment to himself, yet he finds time to call his mother every morning before his day begins. He also enjoys fishing and hunting.
5. Jaclyn "Jackaay" Watt, a 25-year-old landscape supply clerk from Justice, IL. Jackaay lives in a trailer park with her mother, and boasts the nickname "trailer park Barbie." A self-proclaimed workaholic, Jackaay is proud of her job. Almost every weekend she takes in a different concert supporting her friends who play in local bands. She spends much of her time reading autobiographies; her most recent favorite is Marilyn Manson's autobiography.
6. Jaret Elwood, a 26-year-old telephone salesman from Rendon, TX. Jaret is a Texan who refers to himself as a sophisticated redneck, teaches kindergarten, and spends most of his time with his family. At one time, Jaret ranked No. 1 in the state of Texas in the 800-meter. He continued to run track through college and graduated from Texas Tech. Additionally, he enjoys fishing and playing sports.
7. John Colonna, a 24-year-old plumber from Queens, NY. A plumber by day and a 'speaker dancer' by night, John splits his time between New York City and Boca Raton, FL. John attended St. John's University but is currently pursuing a pharmaceutical degree at Florida Atlantic University. He once worked as a stockbroker and is an avid writer. John, the youngest in his family, has a brother and sister 18 and 19 years his senior, respectively. In his spare time, John frequents the beaches of Florida.
8. John "JW" Whitehead, a 24-year-old construction worker from Byram, MS. JW knows everyone in his small Mississippi town where he works for his father's construction business where his mom brings him and his dad lunch every day. He went to University of Southern Mississippi on a football scholarship, but feels like not one of his dreams has ever panned out. Currently, JW is playing arena football for The Lubbock Gunslingers in Lubbock, Texas. He is now a history teacher in McKinney, TX.
9. Julianne "Jules" Levita, a 26-year-old receptionist from Port Station, NY. A Long Island native who currently is working as an apparel store manager, Jules wants to be an event planner but dreams of having her own talk show called, "Tell it to Jules." Jules graduated from St. Joseph's College in Long Island and frequents the club scene in New York City.
10. Latricia Lindsey, a 31-year-old motor vehicles clerk from Inglewood, CA. A military brat born in Germany, Latricia, moved to the United States at a young age. This Los Angeles DMV worker is a single mom devoted to raising her five-year-old son. Latricia will do anything to insure her son has the finer things in life. Despite having a routine life, she wants to dip her feet into the lifestyle of the rich and famous.
11. Niki Pais, a 23-year-old fashion student from Riverside, CA. Niki graduated in fashion design from California Baptist University. For the past 19 years she has been a synchronized swimmer. Currently, Niki works as an interior designer, specializing in residential and commercial design, and is best friends with her twin sister.
12. Rashad El Amin, a 26-year-old waiter from Hollywood, CA. Born in Oakland, Rashad graduated from the University of California, Santa Barbara, where he earned his bachelor's degree in fine arts. Like many young people in Hollywood, Rashad can be found waiting tables where he practices the fine art of networking. He earns money on the side by investing in currency and commodities. In his spare time he loves listening to hip hop music.
13. Vanessa Kemling, a 30-year-old bartender from Las Vegas, NV. Vanessa tends bar at the La Bete bar at Wynn Las Vegas in Las Vegas, but studies at the Fashion Design School. She also is an abstract artist who works with acrylics and oils. Vanessa grew up in East Los Angeles in a rough neighborhood, but moved to the San Fernando Valley as a teenager.
14. Yvette Brown, a 26-year-old dancer from Las Vegas, NV. Born in England, Yvette has traveled extensively during her professional showgirl-dancing career. She moved to Las Vegas two years ago and has no desire to leave. She formerly wrote a column entitled "Making Vegas", about her life in 'Sin City.' Yvette yearns to be swinging high on the Vegas social scene.

== Episodes ==
Yvette and Latricia have a conflict from the start. Yvette is bossy and tries to take over her team, this annoys her team as does her propensity to wear very short skirts. At an auction to raise money for breast cancer (in memory of the Hilton grandmother) she wears Paris Hilton's 21st dress, thereby devaluing it. Ann is a former beauty queen with great belief in herself and her own voice – she breaks into song during eliminations which annoys her teammates. In the Arts Scavenger hunt episode Yvette, Ann and Jackaay work together. Yvette dances a ballet lesson but makes it up thinking she is better than the teacher, she is given a pink tutu which she wears the rest of the day. She dances for Kathy Hilton in the tutu when she meets the teams at the end of the challenge. Ann and Yvette gang up on Jackaay in the elimination, they decide together to vote her off. However, Ann is voted off by Jackaay, Latricia and Jabe. Yvette then leaves as Kathy Hilton does not have her 'on the list.'

== Elimination chart of contestants ==
Contestants	Teams (by episode)					Individual		
Contestants	1	2	3	4	5^{1}	6	7	8
Jaret	Park	Park	Park	Park	Blue	HS		1st
Jackaay	Madison	Madison	Madison	Madison	Blue	HS	HS	2nd
Vanessa	Park	Park	Park	Madison	Green	HS		Elim^{2}
JW	Park	Park	Park	Park	Blue	HS	Elim	
Brenden	Park	Park	Park	Park	Green	Elim		
Jules	Park	Park	Park	Park	Blue	Elim		
Niki	Park	Park	Park	Park	Green	Elim		
Latricia	Madison	Madison	Madison	Madison	Green			
Jabe	Madison	Madison	Madison	Madison				
Rashad	Park	Park	Park	Madison				
Ann	Madison	Madison	Madison					
Yvette	Madison	Madison	Madison					
John	Madison	Madison						
Alan	Madison							

- ^1In episode 5, teams were changed from Park and Madison to Green and Blue.
- ^2Vanessa was eliminated halfway through the episode.
- In Teams, names of teams in their respective colors are 'on the list'. Names highlighted in red have been eliminated from the competition.
- In Individual, the pink background denotes being in the 'hot seat'. The red background indicates an individual is 'not on the list'.
