= Party Monsters Cabo =

- Developed by: Bischoff Hervey Entertainment
- Country of origin: United States
- No. of seasons: 1
- No. of episodes: 8

Production
- Executive producer: Brian Worley
- Running time: 60 minutes (including commercials)

Original release
- Network: E!
- Release: December 2, 2008

Party Monsters Cabo is a reality TV show airing on E!. The show involves party planners competing at the LG Villa in Cabo to see who can throw the "ultimate party" for Hollywood's A-Listers to win a contract with LG for their parties. The show is hosted by Brian Worley and Michele Merkin.

== Episodes ==
=== Episode 1: Lil' Jon ===
First aired Dec. 2 2008

In this first episode the contestants had to plan a party for Lil' Jon

Event Planner(s): Brian

Party Success: No

Bottom Two/Three: Brian, Jilina, Ebony

Eliminated: Brian

=== Episode 2: Diddy ===
First aired Dec. 9 2008

The remaining contestants plan a party for Diddy

Event Planner(s): Brett, Kinsey

Party Success: Yes

Bottom Two/Three: Ebony, Jilina, Tania

Eliminated: Ebony

=== Episode 3: Brody Jenner & Frankie Delgado ===
First aired Dec. 16 2008

The planners learned that they would be planning for Brody Jenner's best friend Frankie Delgado, to forget about his last break-up. They split up into teams (Adrial, Cori, & Tania; Brett & Jilina; Kinsey & Tyler Barnett) and planned an event to present to the judges, including Brody. The team of Adrial, Cori, and Tania became the event planners for Frankie's party. Kinsey was in charge of getting hot girls to mud wrestle, but planned to sabotage the party by hiring ugly women to wrestle. Jilina was in charge of catering and getting an ice sculpture, but shortly after she almost broke her ankle, and couldn't do the job. Kinsey, Brett, and Tyler Barnett were away for seven hours, and no one was able to reach them. Once they got back, Jilina told them what happened and said she ordered a smaller block of ice, but when the sculptor came, he brought a bigger one than expected. Brett argued with him and said that the ice will leak all over the place, and people will slip and fall. Jilina was furious and told the man to not worry about it and finish the job, but he left angrily and left the block of ice standing in front of the pool. Brett was now in charge of getting rid of the block of ice, while Jilina feared of being up for elimination after what Brett did. The party began with people entering on a red carpet and greeted with either a vodka or tequila shot. The other three girls asked Kinsey where are the mud wrestlers and were told that they would be there shortly, and for Brody to introduce them to Frankie. When the wrestlers arrived everyone quickly realized that they were transvestites, and said that whoever is responsible for them has to jump in and wrestle instead. Tania and Cori took one for the team, and wrestled each other in their bikinis which made the guys feel much better. Later on that night, Frankie got completely wasted and was being obnoxious. He went into the living room to get his pants, and Tania told him to get out of the living room several times and Frankie claimed that she yelled at him. When he finally left the room, Adrial also got completely wasted and acted very unprofessional near the end of the party. The next day it was time for the results of the party with Frankie and Brody also judging. Michele and Brian called down the party planners while Frankie expressed his opinion of them, and first started with Tania, bringing up how he felt the party was ruined because she yelled at him. But Tania claimed that she didn't yell at him, and asked him more than once to leave the living room to keep it clean. Michele then asked for anything else that they would like to say, and Tania apologized if Frankie felt that she yelled at him, Cori said she didn't deserve to go home because she did her part well, while Adrial also felt he did his part and calling Frankie "intoxicated" which ended up insulting him. They then asked for everybody to go back to house while they deliberate. Frankie told them that he would like to do the elimination since it was his party, and that he wasn't sure if Tania or Adrial should go home. The judges called the bottom three back down, and in the end Tania was once again spared, sending Adrial home.

Event Planners: Adrial, Cori, Tania

Party Success: No

Bottom Two/Three: Cori, Adrial, Tania

Eliminated: Adrial

=== Episode 4: Khloé & Kourtney Kardashian ===
First aired Dec. 23 2008

Khloé and Kourtney Kardashian throw a party for two friends that have never been to Mexico. They wanted a sexy Mexican party with all the traditional food and drinks. They chose Jilina and Kinsey to be the party planners. Tania was in the entrance giving flowers to every girl so they can put the flower in their hair. Before the party started the buffet caught fire but they had more food and tablecloths and they make it work. Everyone had a good time in the party, they had margaritas and tequila, they also had a pinata. The Kardashians and their friends decided that the party was a success. Tania was not helping in the party as she should, she was upstairs during the party, that's the reason why she was sent home.

Event Planners: Jilina & Kinsey

Party Success: Yes

Bottom Two/Three: Brett, Cori, Tania

Eliminated: Tania

=== Episode 5: Carmen Electra ===
Carmen Electra wants to throw a party for her boyfriend, Rob Patterson. She asked for a childish but sexy birthday party for Rob. Carmen chose Cori to be the event planner. Carmen wanted to pop out of a cake and give Rob a sexy surprise but the cake that Cori gave her was small and Carmen did not pop out of it, instead they looked for a girl at the party and Jilina asked if she wanted to pop out of the cake and give Rob a lap dance. She agreed. In the end Carmen said that the party had fun moments but it was not a success.

Event Planners: Cori

Party Success: No

Bottom Two/Three: Cori, Tyler Barnett, Jilina

Eliminated: Tyler

=== Episode 6: 50 Cent ===
50 Cent wants to celebrate his upcoming releases: A movie, a videogame and his new CD. He wanted a party that represented him. His assistant helped him decide who the party planners should be. There were two teams, Kinsey & Brett and Cori & Jilina. The assistant ended up choosing Kinsey and Brett to be the party planners. Cori was in charge of the catering and Brett asked Jilina to decorate the Game Room. This room was the most important part of the night, that's the room were people could try the videogame and it had to be sexy. 50 also asked for a stage because he wanted to perform. Jilina and Brett fight a lot during this episode. In the elimination 50 decided that the party was a success, and Cori and Jilina were up for elimination. During the party Cori asked 50 Cent what alcoholic drink he wanted, he got offended because he doesn't drink; Jilina was in charge of the game room and it was not sexy as 50 asked. Jilina was sent home.

Event Planners: Kinsey & Brett

Party Success: Yes

Bottom Two/Three: Cori, Jilina

Eliminated: Jilina

=== Episode 7: Missy Elliott ===
The remaining contestants plan a party for Missy Elliott.

Event Planners: Cori

Party Success: No

Bottom Two/Three: Cori, Kinsey, Brett

Eliminated: Cori

== Contestant List ==
Contestants	Episode 1	Episode 2	Episode 3	Episode 4	Episode 5	Episode 6	Episode 7	Episode 8
Brett Rubin 26 DJ, VIP Host, Event Planner, Promoter	B	B	B	B	B	B	B	B
Kinsey Schofield 23 Publicist/Marketing Specialist	K	K	K	K	K	K	K	K
Cori Harris 21 Event Caterer	C	C	C	C	C	C	C	
Jilina Scott 26 Fashion Stylist	J	J	J	J	J	J		
Tyler Barnett 24 Co-owner of P.R./Event Firm	T	T	T	T	T			
Tania Torres 23 Co-owner of events/promotions company	T	T	T	T				
Adrial Hammonds 21 Party Planner and Party Host	A	A	A					
Ebony Cole 25 Director of Marketing	E	E						
Brian Griffin 25 Hollywood Promoter	B							

The contestant was eliminated.
The contestant was eliminated and was the party planner.
The contestant was chosen to be in the bottom two/three.
The contestant was the party planner
The contestant was the party planner and in the bottom two/three
The contestant won Party Monsters Cabo.
