= List of The Dukes of Hazzard episodes =

This is a list of episodes for the 1979–1985 CBS action-adventure/comedy series The Dukes of Hazzard. The show ran for seven seasons and a total of 147 episodes. Many of the episodes followed a similar structure: "out-of-town crooks pull a robbery, Duke boys blamed, spend the rest of the hour clearing their names, the General Lee flies and the squad cars crash". Also, almost every episode would begin with the Duke boys driving along in the General Lee, whether running an errand or just out on a leisurely drive, and inadvertently stumbling upon one of the sheriff's speed traps.

== Series overview ==
Season	Episodes	Originally released	
Season	Episodes	First released	Last released
1	13	January 26, 1979	May 11, 1979
2	25	September 21, 1979	April 20, 1980
3	21	November 5, 1980	April 10, 1981
4	27	October 9, 1981	April 2, 1982
5	22	September 24, 1982	March 25, 1983
6	22	September 23, 1983	March 30, 1984
7	17	September 21, 1984	February 8, 1985

== Episodes ==
=== Season 1 (1979) ===
No. overall	No. in season	Title	Directed by	Written by	Original release date	Prod. code
1	1	"One Armed Bandits"	Rod Amateau	Gy Waldron	January 26, 1979	166861
The Duke family lives in Hazzard County, Georgia. Their patriarch is Jesse Duke, a farmer and former moonshiner who's very wise, and probably the most trusted person in six counties; his nephews, Bo and Luke, and his niece, Daisy, live on the Duke farm with him. Jesse raised Bo, Luke, and Daisy after their parents died in an auto accident. The Duke family had been making moonshine for generations. A few years ago, Bo and Luke got stopped on a moonshine run. Jesse swallowed a lifetime of pride and signed a treaty with the U.S. government to stop making moonshine if Bo and Luke could be released on probation. Since then, Jesse has kept his word and no longer runs moonshine. Even though Bo and Luke are on probation, that does not stop them from having their share of fun. They help Jesse run the Duke farm, and they have a souped-up orange Dodge Charger called the General Lee. Daisy works as a waitress at the Boar's Nest, the most popular bar/restaurant in the county. The Boar's Nest is owned by the corrupt Hazzard County commissioner, Boss Jefferson Davis "J.D." Hogg. Boss Hogg owns just about everything in Hazzard County, including bumbling Sheriff Rosco P. Coltrane. Boss would do just about anything to make a dishonest dollar, but he does not condone violence. Boss is planning to have Rosco receive a delivery of slot machines, and Rosco is loyal enough to do whatever Boss tells him to. After about 20 years as one of the best lawmen in the state, most of Rosco's pension got defeated in the last bond election in Hazzard County, and as a result, Rosco turned bitter and crooked. Now he is up for re-election, against an even more corrupt opponent. After highjacking the shipment of illegal slot machines, Bo and Luke form a plan to distribute the machines to civic clubs and organizations in the area, and use their proceeds from the sales to help the local orphanage get renovated before the health department shuts it down. Guest starring: Tisch Raye as Jill Rae Dodson; Ernie Brown as Dobro Doolan; Dan Fitzgerald as driver; Champ Laidler as Brodie; Gillaaron Houck as Leroy; Lou Walker as Workman; Dennis Haskins as Moss; Sandra Dorsey as Deputy Hazel; Ralph Pace as Harvey; Jason Lively as Rudy. Notes: Many younger Dukes fans may spot a familiar face in this pilot episode: Dennis Haskins, who played the part of Moss. He later became Bayside High School's principal Mr. Belding on Saved by the Bell. Haskins had other recurring guest spots on the Dukes, portraying various characters. Main characters Cooter Davenport (Ben Jones) and Deputy Enos Strate (Sonny Shroyer) do not appear in the opening credits and are not recognized until the end credits. This episode includes many scenes shown in the opening credits, such as the first jump seen by General Lee, the police door closing, Tom Wopat's (Luke) scene, John Schneider's (Bo) two scenes, Catherine Bach's (Daisy) four scenes, the second and third scene featuring Denver Pyle (Uncle Jesse), James Best's (Sheriff Rosco) scene, Sorrell Booke's (Boss) scene, and the jump at the end.
2	2	"Daisy's Song"	Bob Kelljan	Gy Waldron	February 2, 1979	166862
An Atlanta music-publishing outfit bilks Daisy of $50.00, (a corruption of Boss Hogg's) and the FBI has an eye on the whole scam. Bo and Luke head to town to straighten things out for Daisy and end up messing up a police raid on the place. They hatch a scheme to catch the record pirates red-handed by having Daisy pretend to be a potential client to trick the music outfit's ringleader, Lester Starr, into believing she can fake a number of real-life artists. Meanwhile, after being in the wrong place at the wrong time, Bo and Luke are targeted by the FBI and the local law. Boss has his sights set on getting a tie-in with the syndicate, with a new singer that Starr has to audition for them and Boss, who just happens to be Daisy. Big mistake. Guest starring: Ronnie Schell as Lester Starr; Ginny Parker as Mabel; Clayton Landey as Max; Terry Browning as Ruby; Candy Bleick as Dodie; Wallace Merck as Jojo; Bill Gribble as Carson; J. Roy Tatum as FBI Agent #3; Wallace Wilkinson as FBI Agent #1; Bob Cleveland as FBI Agent #2. Notes: While Bo and Luke are discussing their plan in Atlanta, the sign of the first Mellow Mushroom, a popular pizza chain, can be seen behind Bo. Loretta Lynn's name (as well as Coulter's) are dubbed over at several places in this episode. Bill Gribble, who appears as "Carson", also appeared in Moonrunners as Cooter Pettigrew. This episode marks the first time Cooter does his standard CB intro "Breaker 1, breaker 1. I maybe crazy but I ain't dumb. Crrrrazy Cooter comin' at ya!" This is the only episode where the opening sequence does not contain the YEE HAA from Bo and Luke as they make the jump at the end.
3	3	"Mary Kaye's Baby"	Rod Amateau	William Putnam	February 9, 1979	166864
While running from Enos in Cooter's car, Bo and Luke run into a problem: the car that they are driving is loaded with moonshine that Cooter was to deliver for Boss Hogg. Bo and Luke pick up a hitchhiker whom they recognize as their friend Mary Kaye Porter (Jeanne Wilson), who is now nine months pregnant—and on the run from Atlanta crime boss Quirt McQuade (Cliff Pellow), who is looking for $118,254.37 in money that was stolen from him. McQuade thinks Mary Kaye has the money, and when McQuade tracks Mary Kaye to the Duke farm, where Mary Kaye gives birth to a girl, the Dukes pull out all the stops to protect Mary Kaye and her new baby. Guest starring: Jeanne Wilson as Mary Kaye Porter; Cliff Pellow as Quirt McQuade; Colby Chester as Leo. Absent: The General Lee (so instead Bo and Luke drive around in a blue four-door sedan, Cooter's 1975 Plymouth Fury) The General Lee wasn't used in this episode because in the end of the episode, the car they were using (Cooter's Plymouth Fury) was destroyed.
4	4	"Repo Men"	Ron Satlof	Bob Clark	February 16, 1979	166863
Boss Hogg plans to buy his wife Lulu, who is Rosco's sister, a Rolls-Royce from a car lot run by Ace Parker (Jerry Rushing), a crooked car dealer who has already sold the car to a counterfeiting ring, and now Ace and Boss want Bo and Luke to repossess the car so Lulu can have it. It is not going to be easy to repossess the car, especially when Bo and Luke discover that Boss and Ace have been selling stolen cars, and they have set a trap to make it look like Bo and Luke were the thieves who stole the cars. Also, the counterfeiters have stashed counterfeit $20 bill engraving plates in the car, and that is why they are not exactly anxious to give the car up. Guest starring: Larry Bishop as Joey Sagalo; Judith Baldwin as Joey's Moll; Peggy Rea in her first appearance as Lulu Coltrane-Hogg; Rod Amateau as Manny; Claude Humphrey as Big John; Jerry Rushing as Ace Parker. Note: The Richard Petty wreck, featured in the episode as the Duke boy's motivation to do repo work for Ace, was General Lee #1, so Lees #2 and 3 were used in this episode as well.
5	5	"High Octane"	Don McDougall	William Keys and William Kelly	February 23, 1979	166865
Jesse fires up the old moonshining still for a good cause—the Federal Energy Commission is seeking a substitute for fossil fuels in a clean fuel contest in which the grand prize is $20,000. The Dukes decide to enter Jesse's famous moonshine recipe in the contest because it once worked as fuel in Black Tillie, Jesse's old moonshining car. When Boss Hogg hears about the contest, he sets out to steal Jesse's moonshine recipe to use as his own entry in the contest in order to win the money. Meanwhile, federal agent Roxanne Huntley (Charlene Watkins) is in town to investigate possible moonshine running. Guest starring: Carlene Watkins as Agent Roxanne Huntley; Champ Laidler as Brodie; Ralph Pace as Ed Monroe; Bob Hannah as The inventor. Note This was the last episode that was filmed on location in Georgia. All subsequent episodes were filmed in California, and the last time the General Lee had the cross-flags on the panel next to the rear window.
6	6	"Swamp Molly"	Don McDougall	Katherine M. Powers	March 9, 1979	166872
Swamp Molly (Neva Patterson), an old moonshining friend of Jesse's, wants to make "one last run", and she wants the Dukes to help, since Molly saved Jesse from the Feds back in the fall of 1936, and Jesse owes Molly for that. What the Dukes do not know is that Molly is no longer dealing moonshine—her truck is full of contraband firearms that could land Bo and Luke in jail for violating their probation. Guest starring: Neva Patterson as Swamp Molly; Mary Jo Catlett as Cousin Alice; Bill Cort as Agent Callas; Bob Shaw as Agent Swan.
7	7	"Luke's Love Story"	Hy Averback	Kris Kincade, Nance McCornick	March 16, 1979	7
In the annual Hazzard County Obstacle Derby, a notoriously dirty race, Amy Creavy (Roz Kelly), who is from Placid County, becomes the first woman ever to enter the derby. Luke is smitten with her, and they build a relationship together, but Luke has a hard time accepting the fact that he cannot chase other women if he and Amy are going to be together. Things get dangerous when it is discovered that Amy's ex-boyfriend, her former mechanic Turk Foley (David Hayward), is bent on either getting her back—or killing her. Amy had fired Turk and replaced him with Francis Lee "Frankie" Olmstead (Marya Small) because Turk had put nitrous oxide in Amy's engine. Nitrous oxide boosts a car's horsepower, but using nitrous oxide can get a driver disqualified. The Racing Association barred Turk as a driver for life, knowing that Turk had severely injured a total of four drivers in his career in his efforts to win. Boss Hogg needs to win the race because Mama Hogg's ashes are in the winning trophy, but honest deputy Enos Strate is driving for Boss, so Boss has Rosco threaten to sell Cooter's truck unless Cooter becomes a crasher in the race in order to make sure Enos wins. Turk sabotages Amy's race car, and then sneaks into the race himself, using Cooter's car. The race to the finish ends up between Luke, Amy, and Turk, and Amy and Luke do not know that Turk has taken Cooter's place. Guest starring: Roz Kelly as Amy Creavy; Marya Small as Francis Lee Olmstead; David Hayward as Turk Foley; Gary Grubbs as Roy; Patrick Wright as Moss; Darryl McCollough as Ernie Ledbetter.
8	8	"The Big Heist"	Bob Claver	Bruce Howard	March 30, 1979	8
While Boss Hogg is busy counting out his moonshine money, he is robbed of $30,000 of that money by Neil Bishop (Fred McCarren), a chicken farmer that Boss knowingly sold defective farming equipment to. Neil robbed Boss in order to get back the money that he paid Boss for the equipment. Boss thinks that Bo was the robber, and he tells Rosco. Neil ends up at the Duke farm after Daisy makes acquaintance with him at the Boar's Nest. When the Dukes hear about what Boss did to Neil, they decide to turn the tables on Boss by sending revenuer Harvey Essex (Stu Nisbet) after Boss. Guest starring: Fred McCarran as Neil Bishop; Stu Nisbet as Harvey Essex; Bill Meadows as the station attendant; Kris Marquis as Willis.
9	9	"Limo One Is Missing"	Don McDougall	Paul Savage	April 6, 1979	9
President Jimmy Carter sends his car, "Limo One," to Georgia before he visits the state. The Secret Service men and the two state police motorcycle cops that are transporting the limo stop at the Boar's Nest for a fill-up and some coffee, just as Cooter and the Duke boys are leaving. Bo and Luke spot the car, admire it for a bit, then leave. Cooter stays behind to ogle over the car some more, becoming so entranced by the limo that he hot-wires it and takes it for a joyride. Meanwhile, Boss Hogg has a chop shop operation going, and Rosco, who is usually in on Boss Hogg's scams, knows nothing about it. When the limo turns up missing, Rosco assumes that the same car thieves who had been working the county for the past month are the ones who stole it. Boss figures that he has got a sure disaster on his hands if it turns out that his men at the chop shop took the car and have cut it to pieces, until Rosco wonders how much of a reward Boss will get for bringing that "important car" back. Guest starring: Charles Cyphers as Bumper; Del Monroe as Benteen; Mayf Nutter as Dooley; Terry Willis as Tailor; Gordon Hurst as Chet, one of Boss Hogg's guards.
10	10	"Deputy Dukes"	William Asher	Paul Savage	April 20, 1979	10
After being in the wrong place at the wrong time, Bo and Luke are arrested, and the General Lee is impounded. Crime boss Rocky Marlowe (Leo Gordon) is scheduled to be escorted from Springville to Hazzard County where his trail is to be held. Boss sees a money-making opportunity with a high-profile trial such as Marlowe's being held in Hazzard. Not wanting to risk Rosco, or Enos for that matter, Boss decides to send Bo and Luke to transport Marlowe from Springville, in exchange for not selling the General Lee at police auction. Bo and Luke agree, and leave for Springville, but not before being spotted in deputy uniforms by Daisy and Cooter. Along the way, Bo and Luke must deal with Herky (Bob Hoy) and Manny (Pat Renella), two of Marlowe's henchmen who are attempting to free Marlowe. Traveling with Bo and Luke to escort Marlowe to Hazzard, posing as a police officer, is Mary Beth Malone (Stella Parton), who has a personal grudge against Marlowe, who got her father wrongfully locked up, and she plans to kill Marlowe. Guest starring: Stella Parton as Mary Beth Malone; Leo Gordon as Rocky Marlowe; Norman Alden as Chief Lacey; Robert F. Hoy as Herky; Pat Renella as Manny; Suzanne Niles as Maybelle; Tara Preston as Cindy Lou; Billy Benedict as the gas station owner. Notes: Stella Parton, who played Mary Beth in the episode, is the sister to country superstar Dolly Parton. The General Lee was in the first part of this episode and was not seen in the rest of this episode, so Bo and Luke drove Enos' car for the rest of this episode after they are arrested.
11	11	"Money to Burn"	Rod Amateau	Myles Wilder; William Raynor	April 27, 1979	11
Boss Hogg frames Bo and Luke for the robbery of $1 million in retired currency. Boss plans to bury the money in a coffin, report the money stolen, then - after receiving an insurance check to cover the loses - unearth the money. Guest starring: Rick Hurst as Cletus; Norman Bartold as company representative; Dan Barrows as attendant; Hoke Howell as watchman; Damu King as assistant.
12	12	"Route 7-11"	Bob Claver	Fred Freiberger	May 4, 1979	12
In order to come up with $180 to pay Cooter for repairs to the General Lee, Bo and Luke take a job driving an 18-wheeler for Helen Hogan (Joann Pflug), only to discover that they are driving a mobile casino, and Jesse's old friend Dewey Stovall (Paul Brinegar) is gambling away his life savings in the casino. Boss wants to shut down the casino too, but only to take the equipment and start his own casino. To get out of the jam, the Dukes play their trump card—Jesse. Guest starring: Jo Ann Pflug as Helen Hogan; Theodore Wilson as Morgan; Paul Brinegar as Dewey Stovall; Sammy Jackson as Artie.
13	13	"Double Sting"	Gy Waldron	Gy Waldron	May 11, 1979	13
After fighting at the Boar's Nest against Tom Colt (Burton Gilliam), a stranger who tried to assault Daisy, Bo and Luke are arrested. At the jail, the local physician, Doc Henry Petticord (Pat Cranshaw), suspects that Colt has a case of the plague, so he quarantines the jail with the police, Bo, Luke, and Jesse there. Meanwhile, the Hazzard bank, which is owned by Boss Hogg, gets robbed by Irving (Arte Johnson) and Wendel (Avery Schreiber), two crooks who are disguised as Laurel and Hardy, and Daisy chases them. Boss and Rosco wrongly accuse Bo and Luke of setting up the robbery, which is what Tom Colt did for his two accomplices Wendle and Irving by faking his illness so Boss, Rosco, and Enos would be out of the way while Irving and Wendle were robbing the bank. The only way Bo and Luke can clear themselves is to escape from the jail and go after Irving and Wendle, who have kidnapped Daisy. Guest starring: Arte Johnson as Irving; Avery Schreiber as Wendel; Burton Gilliam as Tom Colt; Joseph Burke as Sheriff Emmett "Hammerhand" Ragsdale; Pat Cranshaw as Dr. Henry Petticord; Miriam Byrd-Nethery as Rose Ellen.

=== Season 2 (1979–80) ===
- Starting with this season, a new closing sequence was introduced. This time, it shows the General Lee and Enos' police car going around in circles. This remained in use until the end of the series in 1985. Also at the beginning of this season, the show is now produced by Lou Step Productions.

No. overall	No. in season	Title	Directed by	Written by	Original release date	Prod. code
14	1	"Days of Shine and Roses"	Hollingsworth Morse	Bruce Howard	September 21, 1979	166964
After seeing an old film of when Boss Hogg and Jesse were running moonshine, an argument about who was the better moonshine runner—along with some unintentional prodding from Bo—causes Boss and Jesse to declare a race to determine who the better moonshine runner is. They agree to use jugs of water in place of moonshine, however Boss plots to win the race by switching out the jugs of water in Jesse's car for moonshine, sending Jesse right into the hands of Hatchapee County sheriff Emmitt "Spike" Loomis (Jim Mohlmann), who is known for being unusually tough on moonshiners. After finding out about what Boss has done, Bo, Luke, Cooter and Daisy must alert Jesse of what he is carrying and switch the jugs back to water, mid race. Guest starring: Pat Buttram as Sam; Shug Fisher as Homer; Jim Mohlmann as Sheriff Emmitt "Spike" Loomis; Ancel Cook as Abel; Richard Marion as Helper #1; Richard Jensen as Helper #2.
15	2	"Gold Fever"	Paul Baxley	Si Rose	September 28, 1979	166971
H. H. Harkness (Curtis Credel), a shady character from Texas, arrives in Hazzard and pays Boss Hogg $25,000 to store a pile of gold bars in the Hazzard Bank, telling Boss that the gold is worth $3,000,000. When the gold is stolen from the bank, Bo and Luke are suspected. The Dukes soon discover that the gold is actually lead painted to look like gold. Harkness is a swindler who was using it to try to swindle Boss out of the $3,000,000 in insurance money that would be given to Harkness in the event of a robbery. Guest starring: Curtis Credel as H. H. Harkness; Bruce M. Fischer as Buck; Hunter von Leer as Dusty; Adam Wade as Dr. Homer Willis; Troy Melton as The Driver.
16	3	"The Rustlers"	Dick Moder	Stephen Kandel	October 5, 1979	166968
Jesse's friend Burl Tolliver (Mel Tillis) plans to race his horse, Manassas, in the annual Lulu Hogg Stakes race, but Rosco sees Manassas in a time trial against the General Lee, and reports it to Boss Hogg. Boss steals Manassas for his own use in the race, and then Manassas is stolen by Justin Dunlap (Brett Halsey) and Cowan (Michael MacRae), a pair of thieves who plan to sell him to a man from Nashville, Tennessee for $30,000. Guest starring: Peggy Rea as Lulu Coltrane Hogg; Mel Tillis as Burl Tolliver; Brett Halsey as Justin Dunlap; Michael MacRae as Cowan; Dorothy Collier as Sherry Tolliver; Sam Edwards as Track Steward; Rick Hurst as Cletus Hogg. Side Note: The role of Burl Tolliver was played by country singer Mel Tillis. A year after the end of the series, Dorothy Collier would marry James Best, who played Rosco; the marriage lasted until his death.
17	4	"The Meeting"	Rod Amateau	Story by : Leonard B. Kaufman; Teleplay by : William Raynor & Myles Wilder	October 12, 1979	166861
Boss Hogg rents the Hazzard jail out for $10,000 to his old friend, mobster Black Jack Bender (Paul Lambert), and a group of other syndicate kingpins, so they can hold a conspiracy meeting. When Bo and Luke find a lot of weapons in the cars of Bender and the other kingpins, they start poking around, and discover that Bender is in town, with plans to use Hazzard as the epicenter of his crime syndicate. Bo and Luke quickly find that investigating the mob is a lot easier than getting away from them. The Dukes hatch a plan to outsmart Bender and his associates until federal agents can arrive to take them into custody.
18	5	"Road Pirates"	William Asher	William Raynor & Myles Wilder	October 19, 1979	166962
Boss Hogg's cousin Cletus Hogg, who is much more honest than Boss Hogg is, is substituting for Enos, who is in the hospital with appendicitis. Boss Hogg buys $10,000 in stolen TV sets so he can sell them for a higher price, but Marty Garbade (Billy Green Bush), the man that Boss bought the TVs from, hijacks the truck that is delivering the TVs to Boss. The truck's driver makes a mistake in identifying the hijackers, getting Cletus and the Duke boys wrongfully accused of the hijacking. The Dukes set out to clear themselves and Cletus. Side Notes: First time Duke family uses CB Handle with Uncle Jesse calling himself "Shepherd"...First time Sheriff Rosco says "Cuff 'em and stuff 'em"...Sonny Shroyer as Deputy Enos Strate does not appear in this episode, scripted as out having appendicitis.
19	6	"The Ghost of General Lee"	Jack Starrat	Martin Roth	October 26, 1979	166969
While Bo and Luke are skinny dipping, the General Lee is stolen by Ernie (Caskey Swaim) and Phil (Russ McCubbin), a pair of pool hustlers who drive it into the Hazzard Pond while being chased by Rosco. Unaware that it was not Bo and Luke who were driving the car, Rosco thinks Bo and Luke drowned, and a grief-stricken Rosco tells that to Boss Hogg, Enos, Jesse, and Daisy. Boss schemes to take advantage of the situation by claiming that Bo and Luke stole his genuine Jefferson Davis gold watch and chain so he can collect the insurance on it. Bo and Luke find themselves arriving at their own wake. When they learn that Boss has accused them of stealing his gold watch and chain, they figure that the only way to prove their innocence is to haunt Boss and Rosco by making the General Lee look like a ghost, in order to scare the truth out of Boss. Ernie and Phil are in on the action, planning to rob Boss Hogg's safe at the Boar's Nest. Guest starring: Caskey Swaim as Ernie; Russ McCubbin as Phil; Norman Alden as Sheriff Lacey; Dixie K. Wade as Becky Mae's Mother; Debra Feuer as Becky Mae; Sunshine Parker as Sunshine.
20	7	"Dukes Meet Cale Yarborough"	Ernest Pintoff	Story by : Ron Friedman; Teleplay by : Bruce Howard & William Raynor & Myles Wilder and Ron Friedman	November 2, 1979	166965
While on the run after being framed by Boss and Rosco for crossing the county line and violating their probation, Bo and Luke discover that NASCAR driver Cale Yarborough (as himself) is testing a new turbo charger in preparation for the Illinois 500, and they bring Cale to Hazzard County to get his car serviced by Cooter. Boss Hogg gets in with Cale's biggest opponents, the Jethro brothers, and helps them attempt to steal Cale's turbo charger, so the Jethro brothers, Simon (William Watson) and Rowby (Tom McFadden), can win the race. Guest starring: Cale Yarborough as himself; Harrison Page as Chet Garvey; William Watson as Simon Jethro; Tom McFadden as Rowby Jethro; Lindsay Bloom as Mabel Tillingham; Ray Guth as Amos Stigger; Joey Sagal as Motorcycle Guy (uncredited). Side Note: First time Jesse Duke calls Bo and Luke as CB handles "Shepherd to Lost Sheep"
21	8	"Hazzard Connection"	Paul Baxley	Paul Savage	November 9, 1979	166966
Bo and Luke help Cooter deliver demolition derby cars to Augie Detweiller (John Quade), who runs a traveling demolition derby. Unbeknownst to Bo and Luke, Augie is smuggling stolen racing engines in the derby cars. Rosco discovers the smuggling, and he plans to arrest Bo and Luke. Bo and Luke decide to clear themselves by joining the derby, with Bo going undercover as a driver. Guest starring: John Quade as Augie Detweiller; Med Flory as Shoulders; Gerald McRaney as First workman; Dianne Kennedy as Bessie Lou Perkins.
22	9	"Witness for the Persecution"	Hollingsworth Morse	Story by : Paul Savage; Teleplay by : William Raynor & Myles Wilder	November 16, 1979	166972
Boss Hogg is an important government witness against one of the biggest racketeers in the South, but the racketeer has assigned two hit men, Warren (L.Q. Jones) and Barnes (Bob Hastings), to stop Boss from testifying at the trial, which is scheduled to take place in Savannah. After Boss's life is threatened, an attorney named Tom Pryor (R. G. Armstrong) enlists the help of the Dukes in protecting Boss until it is time for him to testify. While Boss is hiding out at the Duke farm, Rosco takes over his administrative duties, wearing Boss's white continental suits, and relishing the job's absolute authority. Guest starring: R.G. Armstrong as Tom Pryor; L.Q. Jones as Warren; Bob Hastings as Barnes.
23	10	"Granny Annie"	Dick Moder	Bruce Howard	November 23, 1979	166973
When counterfeit $5 bills start turning up, Bo and Luke try to figure out where the bills came from, and it turns out that the bills came from their old friend Granny Annie Coggins (Laurene Tuttle), a local artist who is operating a small-time counterfeiting scheme. Boss Hogg hears of it, and he wants the engraving plates that are used make the bills, because he wants to sell the plates to professional counterfeiter Big Jim Downey (George Murdock) for $25,000. Boss has Granny Annie arrested, and confiscates the engraving plates. Bo and Luke set out to clear Granny Annie's name by stealing the plates back and throwing them into a lake. When Bo and Luke swipe the plates from Big Jim, Big Jim thinks that it is a double cross, so he kidnaps Boss, who he thinks is the one who stole the plates. An emotional Rosco pleads to Bo and Luke to track down Big Jim, and keep Boss from getting killed. Celebrity speed trap: The Oak Ridge Boys, who perform "Old Time Lovin'". Note: This is the first episode to have a celebrity speed trap segment.
24	11	"People's Choice"	Allen Baron	Bruce Howard	November 30, 1979	166970
Bo and Luke become campaign managers for Thelma Claire "T. C." Rogers (Pat Klous), who is running against Boss Hogg for the office of Supervisory Administrator of Hazzard County, a position that Boss cheated her father, Jim Rogers, out of 15 years ago. Boss tries every dirty trick he can think of in his efforts to stop T. C. from winning, let alone registering to run. Bo and Luke help T. C. in her efforts to counter Boss's dirty tricks. T. C. wins by one vote, proving that at least half of Hazzard County is not afraid to vote against Boss. Guest starring: Pat Klous.
25	12	"Arrest Jesse Duke"	Jack Whitman	Si Rose	December 14, 1979	166404
Jesse is arrested for car-stripping when he is spotted at the scene of a car stripping incident by a motorist, while the real car strippers are a group of female mechanics who are working for Boss Hogg. Boss Hogg sells the parts back to the unsuspecting owners. Boss does not even want the temporary acting sheriff—his even more crooked nephew Hughie Hogg (Jeff Altman)—to get in on the scam. Meanwhile, Rosco is out of town to take a refresher course at the Police Academy in Atlanta. Note: Due to this episode airing out of production order, this is the first appearance of Daisy's Jeep "Dixie", which she will eventually receive as a gift in episode "The Runaway", airing two episodes later.
26	13	"Duke of Duke"	Hollingsworth Morse	Herman Groves	January 4, 1980	166402
Gaylord Duke (Simon MacCorkindale), the Dukes' cousin from London, England, comes to Hazzard to claim a piece of property that was willed to him, but the property has $30,000 in back taxes owed on it. Boss Hogg is planning to buy the property for almost nothing at an auction, and sell it to the Dixie King Supermarket chain for $250,000. Gaylord Duke turns out to be Roger Blevin, a con artist who left the real Gaylord Duke behind in England. The British Dukes' names are Philip and Katrina, and the real Gaylord is a preacher. Guest starring: Simon MacCorkindale as Gaylord Duke / Roger Blevin; Ernie Lively as Longstreet B. Davenport; Jim B. Smith as Tax Collector; Barry Gremillion as Homer Hodgekiss.
27	14	"The Runaway"	Dick Moder	Jim Rogers	January 11, 1980	166403
Suzy Holmes (Susan Walden) is on the run from her snobby father, wealthy Tulsa, Oklahoma industrialist C. J. Holmes (Robert Alda), who has sent two private investigators named Les Sloane (Lance LeGault) and Mitch Henderson (Robert Tessier) to Hazzard to stop Suzy from marrying her fiancée Fred Andrews (Edward Edwards), just because Fred is a farmer. C. J. wants Suzy to marry someone within her social class, not someone involved in what C. J. sees as an unglamorous profession. C. J. will stop at nothing—even kidnapping Jesse. Jesse gives C. J. a stern lecture about the dedication and self-sacrifice of farmers. When C. J. finally comes to his senses, after Daisy's yellow 1971 Plymouth Road Runner plunges off of a cliff because of a jammed throttle, and explodes, C. J. is no longer against the marriage taking place. As an apology to Daisy for the destruction of her car, C. J. gives Daisy a new white 1980 Jeep CJ-7 called Dixie. Guest starring: Robert Alda. Note: This was the last episode that Daisy's yellow Plymouth Road Runner was used as it met its demise when it went over Kissing Cliff due to a jammed throttle. It was replaced by the Jeep "Dixie".
28	15	"Follow That Still"	Jack Whitman	William Raynor & Myles Wilder	January 18, 1980	166401
Boss Hogg buys an old tank to use in his J. D. Hogg War Memorial in front of the Boars Nest. Things get out of hand when the Dukes try to help old family friend Hard Luck Jones (Fred Stuthman) kick the habit of running moonshine, and Hard Luck swipes the tank to use as a rolling still. When Bo and Luke try to help Hard Luck, and the tank gets stuck on Duke property, it turns into a race to get rid of the tank before Boss Hogg and local ATF agent Buchanon (John Crawford) find them. As it turns out, Boss is using the tank as a storage place for contraband cigarettes. Guest starring: Fred Stuthman as Hard Luck Jones; John Crawford as Agent Buchanon; Ernie Lively as Longstreet B. Davenport; Ted Markland as Flint; J.J. Johnston as Miller.
29	16	"Treasure of Hazzard"	Hollingsworth Morse	William Raynor & Myles Wilder	January 25, 1980	166405
College history professor Laura Bardsley (Jeannie Wilson) has arrived in Hazzard to find a buried Civil War strongbox that was buried before the Battle of Hazzard, and it contains a regimental payroll. Boss Hogg is also after the strongbox along with acting Hazzard County Sheriff Lester Crabb (Note: Rosco is still said to be in Atlanta at the police academy). Laura promises to give Boss Hogg and Sheriff Crabb the money contained in the strongbox, as long as she keeps the historic documents and other items of interest in it. Fortune hunter Stacy Williams (Doris Dowling) and her accomplice, Dr. James Fenwick (Whit Bissell), will stop at nothing to get to the strongbox first. The Dukes become involved, and help Laura recover the strongbox when it is stolen by Stacy and Dr. Fenwick. Guest starring: Jeannie Wilson as Professor Laura Bardsley; Doris Dowling as Stacy Williams; Whit Bissell as Dr. James Fenwick; Walter Barnes as Jeb McCobb; Cindy Acker as Sam McCobb; Sandy Acker as Gerry McCobb; Duke Robbins as Zack; Clifton James as Sheriff Lester Crabb.
30	17	"Officer Daisy Duke"	Dick Moder	Martin Roth	February 1, 1980	166406
Luke unintentionally gets Daisy fired from the Boar's Nest by helping her ask Boss Hogg for a raise. With Rosco still at the police academy in Atlanta, Boss hires a new temporary acting sheriff, Grady Byrd (Dick Sargent), who has been the night watchman at the Hazzard County Gravel Pit for 20 years. Boss Hogg tells Grady that the Dukes are the enemy, and to keep the Dukes out of his hair. Daisy cannot find another job, so Enos suggests that Daisy apply for a position as a Hazzard County deputy. Jesse is all for it, but Boss Hogg is against the idea of having any Duke work as a deputy. Enos spots Floyd Baker (Peter Brown) and Molly Harmon (Jenny Neumann), a pair of wanted bank robbers. Enos contacts Grady, who finds the robbers and chases them. Grady stops their car and takes them to the Hazzard jail. Later, Grady gives Daisy and two other female candidates a written and physical test. Daisy is the only one who passes, and as much as Boss Hogg and Grady hate it, they have no choice but to make Daisy a deputy. Bo and Luke get overprotective of Daisy, and Daisy makes it clear that she does not want any help from Bo and Luke. When Daisy gives Boss Hogg a ticket for parking in a red zone, Boss Hogg tells Grady to make sure Daisy does not patrol any more beats. Boss tells Grady to make Daisy do the kind of jobs that would make her quit her job as a deputy. Later, at the jail, Floyd and Molly knock Daisy out, and escape in her patrol car. Enos sees them leaving, but they get Enos off their tail. They even get Bo and Luke off their tail. Daisy comes to, and Boss, who wanted the $10,000 reward being offered to whoever gets Molly and Floyd, tells Grady to fire Daisy for letting Molly and Floyd escape. Grady fires Daisy, and outside, Bo and Luke want to go with Daisy to get Molly and Floyd, but Daisy tells Bo and Luke to stay out of the way, and then Jesse tells them to leave Daisy alone. Enos and Daisy go after Molly and Floyd, but Enos falls and hurts himself. Daisy takes his gun and continues after Molly and Floyd. When she finds them, they kidnap her and take her to an airfield, where their accomplice was waiting with an airplane. Bo and Luke arrive in the Jeep and collect Enos (who CB's the law). Then Bo and Luke shoot a dynamite arrow in front of the plane. In the commotion Daisy manages to get the gun from Floyd. Soon Grady and Boss arrive, and arrest Molly, Floyd, and their accomplice. Daisy is awarded a medal for bravery and the $10,000. Boss Hogg also hires her back as waitress at the Boar's Nest. Guest starring: Dick Sargeant as Sheriff Grady Byrd; Peter Brown as Floyd Baker; Jenny Neumann as Molly Harmon; Jim Kindelon as Bartender; Rodney McGaughy as Driver; Nick Dimitri as Defense instructor (uncredited); Glenn Morshower as Roadside victim (uncredited).
31	18	"Find Loretta Lynn"	Arthur Marks	Jim Rogers	February 8, 1980	166963
When Loretta Lynn detours through Hazzard County, she is stopped by Boss Hogg's celebrity speed trap. Later, at the Boar's Nest, Loretta is kidnapped by Squirt (Henry Gibson), Bubba (Dennis Burkley), and Cindy (Rebecca Reynolds), the three members of an aspiring country music band who believe that Loretta is their key to success. They demand a ransom of $1,136.15 because they simply want to recoup the money that was cheated out of them by a fraudulent record label. Guest starring: Loretta Lynn as herself; Henry Gibson as Will "Squirt" Jason; Dennis Burkley as Bubba; Rebecca Reynolds as Cindy; Janet Meshad as Leona; Hap Lawrence as Loretta's driver.
32	19	"Jude Emery"	Rod Amateau	Gy Waldron	February 15, 1980	166407
Texas Ranger Jude Emery (John Shearin) has arrived in Hazzard in his search for dangerous crime boss Russel "The Snake" Harmon (Sam Melville), and Jude enlists the help of Bo and Luke in the search. Bo, Luke, and Jude are captured by Snake's gang, leading Daisy, Jesse, Cooter, and even acting Sheriff Grady Byrd to search for them. Guest starring: Dick Sargeant as Sheriff Grady Byrd; John Shearin as Jude Emery; Sam Melville as Russel "Snake" Harmon; C. Pete Munro as Willie; George Buck Flower as Coy Randolph; Ben Davidson as Patch Laurel.
33	20	"Return of the Ridge Raiders"	Hollingsworth Morse	Si Rose	February 22, 1980	166408
After a 40-year hiatus, the legendary Hazzard Ridge Raiders have reunited. The Ridge Raiders are out to stop Boss Hogg, who is a former Ridge Raider, from using the money intended for a senior-citizens center to turn the Boar's Nest into a playpen for his "Pretty Piggies". The Ridge Raiders believe that the best way to stop Boss is by using dynamite bombs on Boss's moonshine stills and other properties. Jesse, who is a former Ridge Raider himself, tries to sort it out and avoid trouble, but in typical Duke fashion, he lands right in the middle of it.
34	21	"Mason Dixon's Girls"	Jack Starrett	Bruce Howard	February 29, 1980	166409
Rosco returns from his refresher course at the Police Academy in Atlanta. Bo and Luke, thinking that there is a new hot water heater in the box that they picked up at the bus depot, soon discover that they have picked up a box full of marijuana, and Rosco arrests them. Private investigator Mason Dixon (Dennis Rucker) and his two associates, Tinker Churchill (Mary Margaret Humes) and Sam Rose (Robin G. Eisenmann), arrive in Hazzard to go after Dempsey (Morgan Woodward), the drug ring leader that the box of marijuana belongs to. Guest starring: Dennis Rucker as Mason Dixon; Mary Margaret Humes as Tinker Churchill; Robin G. Eisenmann as Samantha Rose; Taylor Lacher as Rayford Davis; Larry Watson as Johnny Ryan; Morgan Woodward as Dempsey; Lindsay Bloom as Mabel Tillingham; John F. Huff as George Henry.
35	22	"R.I.P. Henry Flatt"	Denver Pyle	William Raynor & Myles Wilder	March 14, 1980	166431
Henry Flatt (Hal Smith), a con artist who faked his death after swindling Boss out of $20,000 a year ago, shows up, and the Dukes try to help him with his problem: Boss Hogg is planning on plowing up an old veteran's cemetery to build a new highway and a subdivision called Hogg's Heavenly Acres—and plowing up that cemetery would alert Boss that Henry is still alive. Guest starring: Hal Smith as Henry Flatt; Audrey Landers as Gail Flatt; Jim English as Attendant; Mallie Jackson as Peggy.
36	23	"Southern Comfurts"	Rod Amateau	Martin Roth	March 21, 1980	166432
Jesse's cousin Holly Comfurt (Mariam Byrd Nethery) and her family suddenly strike it rich when Holly sells her farm for $250,000, but while in Hazzard, the Comfurts rent a Rolls-Royce that breaks down, and Cooter lends them a car while he fixes it. The loaner car is stolen from outside Cooter's garage by a drunk man, with the money in a case in the trunk, and then the car is sold to two men who plan to rob the Hazzard Bank, while Boss Hogg makes plans to get his hands on Holly's money. Guest starring: Miriam Byrd-Nethery as Holly Comfurt; Bernard Fox as Higgins; Edward Edwards as John Henry Comfurt; Lori Lethin as Lori Comfurt; John Lawrence as Frank Baldwin; Gene LeBell as Bank Robber (uncredited).
37	24	"Carnival of Thrills: Parts 1 & 2"	Dick Moder	William Raynor & Myles Wilder	April 20, 1980	166433A
38	25	"Carnival of Thrills: Parts 1 & 2"	Dick Moder	William Raynor & Myles Wilder	April 20, 1980	166433B
When the Dukes go to see a stunt show called "The Carnival of Thrills", the star of the show, Bob Dexter (Richard Jensen), is injured while trying to jump a car over a pile of 32 cars, and that is the third consecutive time that that has happened in attempts to perform the 32-car jump. After that, the carnival's owner, Diane Benson (Robin Mattson), offers Bo a chance to use the General Lee to perform the 32-car jump. Bo falls for Diane, and agrees to do the jump. A feud erupts between Bo and Luke when Luke, fearing for Bo's safety, allows the General Lee to be impounded so Bo cannot do the stunt. What Luke does not know is that Boss Hogg plans to have the General Lee flattened and recycled so the Dukes cannot outrun Rosco anymore. And Boss Hogg also plans to take over the carnival by making sure Diane cannot pay the fee for using the Hazzard fairgrounds. After Luke and Bo learn that Boss plans to destroy the General Lee, the Dukes rescue the General Lee, but the situation leads to a fist fight between Bo and Luke. After the fight, Bo leaves the Duke farm, and prepares for the jump, but Luke, Daisy, and Jesse are determined to stop him. Then they receive some shocking news about the carnival from John Zimbra (Vernon Weddle), an investigator from an insurance company. John tells Luke, Daisy, Jesse, and Cooter that the three accidents that have happened in the past three attempts to do the 32-car jump were not accidents. Someone has been trying to kill any driver who tries to do the jump, and Bo might be next unless Luke, Jesse, Daisy, and Cooter can stop whoever is sabotaging the drivers. It turns out to be Carl (Don Stroud), the carnival's former star performer, who used to regularly do the 32-car jump before injuring his knee, which forced him to stop driving in the carnival. Carl has been trying to sabotage anyone who tries the jump because he cannot stand watching himself being replaced by other drivers. Guest starring: Robin Mattson as Diane Benson; Vernon Weddle as John Zimbra; Don Stroud as Carl; Richard Jensen as Bob Dexter; Greg Finley as Proprietor. Note: Carnival of Thrills aired as a two-hour special on Sunday, April 20, 1980. It served as the finale to the 1979-1980 season. CBS and ABC were running neck and neck in the overall ratings for the entire 1979-1980 season. It all came down to this Sunday night on April 20, 1980, to see which network would win the ratings race. CBS ran this new Dukes of Hazzard episode against the hit movie The Sting on ABC. The Carnival of Thrills special garnered higher ratings than The Sting giving CBS the ratings victory not only for this night but for the entire 1979-1980 season. The Carnival of Thrills episode was repeated by CBS again as a two-hour special on Tuesday, September 16, 1980.

=== Season 3 (1980–81) ===
- This season consists of 21 episodes.
- Season 3 brought a big change to the show. Sonny Shroyer, who played the part of Deputy Enos Strate, was leaving the show to star in a short-lived Dukes of Hazzard spin-off series, called Enos. Rosco's pet dog Flash was introduced in this season. Flash would stay until the end of the series in 1985.
- In the first episode, Enos was written out of the show as moving to California to take a job with the Los Angeles Police Department. This is the last season to use the Season 2 closing theme.
- During the opening credits, Enos is out, and Cletus Hogg (Rick Hurst) is in.

No. overall	No. in season	Title	Directed by	Written by	Original release date	Prod. code
39	1	"Enos Strate to the Top"	Rod Amateau	William Raynor & Myles Wilder	November 5, 1980	167122A
After Daisy takes a picture of Jesse in front of a bank in Atlanta, the Dukes notice that, in the background of the picture, the bank is getting robbed, and the picture shows the robbers removing their masks as they escape. The robbers follow the Dukes to Hazzard, and kidnap Daisy, demanding the picture in return for Daisy's release. Enos—against Rosco's orders—helps the Dukes rescue Daisy, and Enos is fired. To replace him, Boss hires his cousin Cletus Hogg as deputy. Enos is offered a job with the Los Angeles Police Department, a job that he has always wanted. Enos accepts the job, and moves to Los Angeles. Also, Rosco now has a Basset Hound named Flash. Guest starring: Leonard Stone as Greg; Nedra Volz in her first appearance as Emma Tisdale; Jerry Summers as Nathan Cosgroves; Tom Oberhaus as Tom Gumbs; Troy Milton as Danny.
40	2	"The Hazzardville Horror"	Jack Whitman	Si Rose	November 7, 1980	167126
A pair of thieves, Claude Billings (Charles Tyner) and his son Billy Joe Billings (Andrew Robinson), steal Boss Hogg's silver collection from the Boar's Nest, and stash it at an old abandoned house that the Duke cousins' childhood friend Mary Lou Pringle (Morgan Brittany) has inherited from her uncle Ezekiah "Zeke" Pringle, but Boss thinks it was Daisy, Bo, and Luke who stole the silver. To keep Mary Lou away from the house while the silver is being melted for easy transport, Claude and Billy Joe stage a series of fake paranormal events to make the house look like it is haunted, but Mary Lou has the Dukes on her side. Guest starring: Morgan Brittany as Mary Lou Pringle; Andrew Robinson as Billy Joe Billings; Charles Tyner as Claude Billings. Celebrity speed trap: Tammy Wynette, who performs "Rocky Top".
41	3	"And In This Corner, Luke Duke"	Paul Baxley	Jim Rogers	November 14, 1980	167125
A boxer named Catfish Lee (Sonny Shields), and his crooked promoter and manager, Billy Ray (Richard Schall), pick a fight with Luke so they can trick him into a boxing match and make a killing on tickets. When Catfish knocks Luke into Boss Hogg's new $3,000 mirror at the Boar's Nest, Boss demands that Luke fight Catfish in a match to pay for the mirror, or Jesse might be forced to sell the Duke farm in order to come up with the money. Luke, a former boxer, reluctantly agrees, but Catfish, Billy Ray, and their boss, Mr. Culpepper (Eddie Ryder), set out to make sure Luke never gets to the match, so they can automatically get all the gate money without Boss Hogg getting any of it. Guest starring: Richard Schaal as Billy Ray; Sonny Shields as Catfish Lee; Eddie Ryder as Mr. Culpepper; Patrick Cranshaw as Dr. Henry Petticord; Dianne Anthony as Bessie Loo Perkins.
42	4	"The Late J.D. Hogg"	Hollingsworth Morse	Martin Roth	November 21, 1980	167124
Boss Hogg manages to foreclose on the Duke farm fair and square, thanks to Cletus, and he also has the Dukes wrongfully arrested on a federal charge, but then Boss gets news from his doctor that he has some type of terminal illness that gives him only two weeks to live. Believing that the only way to save himself from the devil is to perform good deeds until he dies, Boss gives the Dukes their farm back, and drops the charge. He also signs over many of his holdings to the poor people of Hazzard. Meanwhile, the Dukes have to deal with Linc McKay (James McIntire) and Dell Webber (Ray Young), a pair of thieves who plan to rob the truck that is transporting the outgoing mail from Hazzard County, which includes $100,000 in Social Security checks, and all of the "good deed" papers that Boss signed. It is up to the Dukes to get the mail back from Linc and Dell so the papers that Boss signed can get to their destination. Boss's doctor receives a report that his diagnosis of Boss's condition was an error, and Boss is healthy. Boss is pleased at the correct results, but he is devastated when he realizes that the good deeds that he has done cannot be reversed. Guest starring: James McIntire as Linc McKay; Ray Young as Dell Webber; Warren Munson as Dr. Ronald L. Carney; Lindsay Bloom as Mabel Tillingham; Joanne Hickman as Nurse Gretchen Stanweller; Dennis Haskins as Charlie Watkins.
43	5	"Uncle Boss"	Hollingsworth Morse	William Raynor & Myles Wilder	November 28, 1980	166967
Boss Hogg wants the Dukes out of his way for good so they cannot interfere with his scams, so he calls his college-educated nephew Hughie Hogg (Jeff Altman) to come to Hazzard County and get the job done. Because Hughie is even sneakier than Boss is, Hughie just might be the man for the job. Hughie frames Daisy for running moonshine, and when Bo and Luke help her escape, Hughie videotapes the breakout, and leaves with Boss for Atlanta to turn the tape over to the state police. Since Hughie's tape makes Rosco look bad, Rosco tells the Dukes about Hughie's plan, and they all set out to stop Hughie and Boss before they reach Atlanta. Guest starring: Jeff Altman as Hughie Hogg; Ellen Murray as Mary Belle Digby. Note: This was the second on-air appearance of Hughie Hogg, but is clearly written as his introduction to the show. This episode also has Enos, who departed the show in the season 3 premiere, and also has Daisy's yellow Plymouth Road Runner, which was destroyed in season 2, episode 12 "Arrest Jesse Duke" (production code 166403). Therefore this episode was filmed for season 2, prior to the filming of "Arrest Jesse Duke".
44	6	"Baa, Baa White Sheep"	Dick Moder	William Raynor & Myles Wilder	December 5, 1980	167121
Boss Hogg's honest twin brother, Abraham Lincoln Hogg (Sorrell Booke), comes to Hazzard for the reading of their great-aunt Emma Lou Hogg's will, which entitles a piece of land to both of them—but Boss had Abe declared legally dead five years ago when Abe disappeared in Africa. What happened was Abe got caught up in so many business ventures that he lost track of the time. Now Abe has returned to claim his half of Emma Lou Hogg's land, but Boss has already sold the land to a developer. Boss has Abe arrested in a nearby town so Abe will miss the reading of the will. Luke and Daisy race to get Abe back before Boss pulls off his big switch and grabs the land that Abe plans to give to charity. Guest starring: Sorrell Booke as Abraham Lincoln Hogg; Boyd Bodwell as Benjamin "The Quill" Thompson; Ross Elliot as Finchburg Sheriff; Ted Gehring as Judge Charles Druten; Tony Brubaker as Abraham's Driver (uncredited) Jerry Summers as Workman with Ladders (uncredited) Unknown actor as State Trooper (uncredited) Note: Sorrell Booke appears in this episode in a dual role: in his regular role of "Boss" Jefferson Davis Hogg and as his twin brother Abraham Lincoln Hogg. John Schneider was shooting a TV movie at the time, so Bo Duke is absent from this episode; according to the Balladeer, Bo is spending this weekend with the USMC reserves.
45	7	"Mrs. Rosco P. Coltrane"	Jack Whitman	Si Rose	December 12, 1980	167123
After meeting Sue Ann Bliss (Tori Lysdahl) through a computer dating service, Rosco plans to get married, and Boss Hogg plans for him to invite everyone in town to his wedding except for the Dukes. That makes the Dukes the only possible suspects for the $100,000 miners' payroll robbery that Boss is arranging to take place at the Hazzard Bank during the ceremony. What no one knows is that Sue Ann's real name is Sue Ann McGraw, and that she, her husband Vic McGraw (Reid Smith), and their friend Russ Collins (William Sanderson) are also planning to rob the Hazzard Bank. Guest starring: Lucille Benson as Mama Coltrane; Tori Lysdahl as Sue Ann McGraw; William Sanderson as Russ Collins; Reid Smith as Vic McGraw. Recurring guest: Peggy Rea as Lulu Coltrane Hogg.
46	8	"The Great Santa Claus Chase"	Denver Pyle	Martin Roth	December 19, 1980	167127
In the series' only Christmas-themed episode; Boss Hogg, who is in an Ebenezer Scrooge-like mood, hires a trio of criminals named Willie (Woody Strode), Russ (Brian Libby), and Hank (Roger Pancake) to hijack a truckload of already-paid-for Christmas trees that Bo and Luke are bringing to Hazzard for needy families, and then pin the blame on the Dukes. The scheme involves Russ and Hank stealing the trees from Bo and Luke at gunpoint, then Willie disguised as a clergyman giving Bo and Luke a lift into town, and then telling them they forgot "their" $500 down payment on the trees. With the town beginning to turn against the Dukes, the Dukes and Cooter race to find the trees and return Hazzard's Christmas spirit. Willie and his two men plot to double-cross Boss by taking more than their payment due on the trees, by breaking into the safe at the Boar's Nest while each one is dressed as Santa Claus. Bo and Luke, with some help from Cooter, decide to take back the trees and have a little fun confusing Rosco and Cletus while delivering the trees dressed as Santa Clauses. It takes a turn toward forgiveness and fellowship as the Dukes and Cooter invite Rosco and Cletus to their Christmas Eve gathering. Boss comes in later, reformed after having read Charles Dickens' A Christmas Carol. Guest starring: Woody Strode as Reverend Willie; Brian Libby as Russ; Roy Jenson as Lacey; Dale Pullum as Otis J.; Roger Pancake as Hank.
47	9	"Good Neighbors Duke"	Dick Moder	Len Kaufman	January 2, 1981	167128
While being chased by Rosco, Bo and Luke crash on a piece of land believed to not be owned by anyone. They soon find out they are wrong, and make friends with the new citizens of Hazzard, the Bensons. The Bensons are actually federal witnesses named Adam (John Larch) and Esther Venable (Cynthia Leake). Adam testified in a ransom case where $2,000,000 in diamonds disappeared, and now, the Venables are being chased by Hickey Burns (William Mims) and Leroy Little (Spencer Milligan), a pair of bounty hunters who think Adam knows where the diamonds are. The Dukes now have to help the Venables avoid Burns and Little, without getting killed doing it. Also, Boss Hogg mistakenly thinks there is uranium in Hazzard. Guest starring: John Larch as Adam Venable; Cynthia Leak as Esther Venable; William Mims as Hickey Burns; Spencer Milligan as Leroy Little; Grant Owens as Agent Dixon; James Reynolds as Agent Clayton Celebrity speed trap: Hoyt Axton, who performs "Out-of-State Cars" (watch for Rosco taking notes about the red light trap).
48	10	"State of the County"	Dick Moder	Bruce Howard	January 9, 1981	167134
Boss Hogg's State of the County address threatens to literally go up in smoke because of Boss J. W. Hickman (Larry D. Mann), the county commissioner in Claridge County. Hickman, who is meaner than Boss is, has been trying for years to take over Boss's operations in Hazzard County. Daisy gives a stranger named Earl Beckett (Phillip Brown) a ride into Hazzard to work for Cooter, and Daisy finds herself falling for Earl. What the Dukes do not know is that Hickman has hired Earl to kill Boss so that Hickman can take over Boss's operations in Hazzard County. Earl gets Bo and Luke accused of the attempts to kill Boss. In order to clear their names, Bo and Luke will have to figure out who Hickman hired to kill Boss. Guest starring: Philip Brown as Earl Beckett; Ken Foree as Rollo; A.J. Freeman as Truck Driver; Larry D. Mann as Boss J. W. Hickman. Celebrity speed trap: The Oak Ridge Boys (in their second appearance), who perform "Leaving Louisiana in the Broad Daylight".
49	11	"The Legacy"	Hollingsworth Morse	William Raynor & Myles Wilder	January 16, 1981	167129
Lucinda Meadows (Jan Clayton), the first woman Jesse ever courted, returns to Hazzard to claim an old $5,000 debt owed to her late husband by Boss Hogg. Not surprisingly, Boss refuses to pay it. Lucinda and the Dukes find a legacy—nine full barrels of moonshine—in a mine under the Duke property. Lucinda plans to get the $5,000 by selling Boss Hogg the moonshine, which Boss Hogg plans to sell to "mean" Joe Hatcher (Gregory Walcott). Guest starring: Jan Clayton as Lucinda Meadows; Gregory Walcott as Mean Joe Hatcher; Jack Garner as Blaine; Jay Ripley as Deputy Wilbur Fudge. Notes: James Best as (Rosco P. Coltrane) does not appear in this episode. Cletus is temporarily promoted to Acting Sheriff and Rosco's absence is explained by Rosco and Flash going to Capitol City for obedience training.
50	12	"Duke vs. Duke"	Paul Baxley	William Raynor & Myles Wilder	January 23, 1981	167130
Hazzard's first annual Hazzard Derby is taking place. Cooter borrowed money from Boss to build his car, which has a Cale Yarborough racing engine in it. If Cooter wins, the engine is sold, and Cooter will get a lot of money for it. When Cooter is injured in a friendly race with Bo and Luke, Luke takes over driving Cooter's car. However, all the entrants who signed the contracts to enter the derby did not see the fine print about how every loser will have to give up their car to Boss Hogg if Rosco wins. Boss thinks Rosco's car cannot lose with a tank of nitrous oxide in the engine so, Boss places a $10,000 bet on Rosco's car with big-time Chickasaw County bookie Ma Harper (Fran Ryan), which Ma Harper places a side bet on. Ma Harper tells her three sons to make sure that Rosco wins the race. Guest starring: Fran Ryan as Ma Harper; Johnnie Collins III as Billy Boy Harper; Richard Fullerton as Billy Gene Harper; Alan Wyatt, Jr. as Junior Harper; Sandy Wescott as Nurse.
51	13	"My Son, Bo Hogg"	Rod Amateau	Si Rose	January 30, 1981	167131
Chickasaw County moonshine dealer C. V. Gumble (Anne Haney) has customers who are demanding moonshine, but she does not have any to sell. Gumble calls Boss Hogg and tells him that she needs him to send a shipment of his moonshine to her, and she is willing to pay as much as 10 times the going rate, but Boss is having a hard time finding a driver who is not afraid of Chickasaw County Sheriff "Big Ed" Little (Don Pedro Colley). Bo is driving a car that he borrowed from Cooter on his way to meet with a friend for a boar-hunting trip, and Boss and Rosco start chasing him. Due to fallen boulders blocking the road, Bo pulls off the road, and when he gets out of the car, he trips and hits his head on a log. Boss and Rosco take Bo to the emergency room without telling the other Dukes. When Boss and Rosco are told that Bo has amnesia, Boss sees the perfect answer to his problem: he introduces himself as Bo's father and Rosco as Bo's uncle. Boss plans to get Bo to drive the moonshine into Chickasaw County. When Jesse, Luke, and Daisy figure out what Boss is up to, they have to get to Bo before Sheriff Little does. Guest starring: Don Pedro Colley in his first appearance as Sheriff "Big Ed" Little; Anne Haney as C. V. Gumble; Bill Cross as Bubba, the Armored Truck Driver; Ken Hixon as Dr. Floyd.
52	14	"To Catch a Duke"	Denver Pyle	Bruce Howard	February 6, 1981	167132
Myrna Roby (Martha Smith) and Burt Roby (James Crittenden), a couple who pulled off a jewelry robbery in Nashville, come through Hazzard County, where they immediately get busted on one of Rosco's phony charges. When Rosco and Boss learn who the Robys are, the Robys escape, and hijack Bo and Luke in the General Lee. Now Boss thinks Bo and Luke were in on the robbery. Things become complicated when Rosco's dog, Flash, retrieves the stolen loot and takes it to Rosco's patrol car. Upset that he was not told about the stolen jewels (so he could take a cut), Boss fires Rosco. It is up to the Dukes to clear themselves and Rosco. Guest starring: James Crittenden as Burt Roby; Martha Smith as Myrna Roby; Victoria Johnson as Lori Mae. Note: This is the only episode in the entire series in which Catherine Bach (as Daisy Duke) does not appear.
53	15	"Along Came a Duke"	Paul Baxley	Len Kaufman	February 13, 1981	167133
The Dukes receive a visit from their motorcycle-riding cousin Jeb Stuart Duke (Christopher Hensel), who lives in Claridge County. Atlanta museum curator Eustice Hastings (Earl Boen) is having Bo and Luke transport historic General Stonewall Jackson's personal sword to display for Boss Hogg's annual Stonewall Jackson Day, but Boss plans to sell the sword for $25,000 to Beauregard Mason (Kenneth O'Brien), Georgia's biggest fencer of stolen goods. Guest starring: Christopher Hensel as Jeb Stuart Duke; Earl Boen as Eustice Hastings; Dennis Holahan as Harry Joe; Tony Brubaker as Tiny; Buck Young as the marshal; Kenneth O' Brien as Beauregard Mason.
54	16	"By-Line, Daisy Duke"	Hollingsworth Morse	Martin Roth	February 20, 1981	167139
Boss Hogg hires a pair of thieves named Vic (Michael Greene) and Corey (Alex Kubik) to steal tractors and other heavy equipment from various farmers that Boss had given out loans to. Boss loaned them the money to buy the equipment seven years ago, when interest rates were low. Now that interest rates are higher, Boss feels like he is losing about 15% a year. Boss is having the equipment stolen from the farmers and brought to him—he sees it as a way to recoup his losses. Boss plans to make even more money by selling the equipment to a buyer that he made a deal with. While Daisy moonlights as a contributing reporter at the Hazzard Gazette, Boss frames Bo and Luke for the thefts by having Vic and Corey set it up to where Daisy's snapshot of the thieves shows Bo and Luke instead of Vic and Corey. Boss does not plan to put Bo and Luke in jail right away, however—he wants them to be free just long enough for Vic and Corey to finish the thefts. Daisy's boss, Hazzard Gazette editor Clyde Amos (Richard Paul), wants the story, no matter who is in the picture. Daisy and Jesse beg him to not get Bo and Luke put in jail for something they did not do. Clyde tells the Dukes that the best he can do is give the Dukes the eight hours until press time to find Vic and Corey so that Bo and Luke can clear their names. Guest starring: Richard Paul as Clyde Amos; Michael Greene as Vic; Alex Kubik as Corey; Kevin Hagen as Farmer Perkins. Celebrity speed trap: Dottie West, who performs "Even If You Were Jesse James" at the Boar's Nest.
55	17	"The Return of Hughie Hogg"	Dick Moder	Bruce Howard	March 6, 1981	167135
Boss Hogg calls his nephew Hughie Hogg (Jeff Altman) back to Hazzard to get rid of the Dukes. Hughie coaxes Bo and Luke into joining the Hazzard County Fire Department so that he and his two henchmen, Barclay (Pat Studstill) and Norris (Roger Torrey), can sneak moonshine to the Duke farm while the Dukes are out on a phony fire call, and frame Bo and Luke for possession of moonshine. Hughie also swindles Boss out of everything Boss owns by having a phony IRS agent (John H. Fields) audit Boss. Now the Dukes and Boss have to team up to take Hazzard back from Hughie, while Rosco's sister and Lulu's sister-in-law Hortense Coltrane (Frances Bay) is in town for a visit. Guest starring: Frances Bay as Hortense Coltrane; Roger Torrey as Norris; Pat Studstill as Barclay; John H. Fields as Roy (A.B. Stillwell). Recurring guest: Jeff Altman as Hughie Hogg.
56	18	"Bye, Bye, Boss"	Denver Pyle	Jim Rogers	March 13, 1981	167136
While on the way to the Boar's Nest, Bo and Luke are ambushed by escaped convict Digger Jackson (Charles Napier), who steals the General Lee and plans to hunt down Boss Hogg. Jackson is angry and bent on settling a score with Boss Hogg—the man who put Jackson in prison 10 years ago. Bo and Luke are accused of a robbery committed by Jackson, and when Jackson kidnaps Boss for a ransom, no one in Hazzard wants to help get Boss back from Jackson. Realizing that, the Dukes take on the task. Guest starring: Charles Napier as Digger Jackson; A. Paul Smith as Hobie Harkins; Harry Caeser as Homer Griggs; Earl Colbert as Deke Haskell. Recurring guest: Peggy Rea as Lulu Coltrane Hogg. Celebrity speed trap guest: Freddy Fender, who performs "Jambalaya" at the Boar's Nest.
57	19	"The Great Hazzard Hijack"	John Florea	William Raynor & Myles Wilder	March 27, 1981	167141
Bo and Luke find a stack of money floating in Hazzard creek, just a fraction of the $1,000,000 stolen in a highjacking five years earlier. Soon after, an old Marine friend of Luke's named Phill Ackley (Rick Hill) arrives in Hazzard with his sister Kate (Simone Griffeth) and his friend Tommy Dunkirk (Sam Melville). Phill tells the Dukes that his sister was wrongfully blamed for the highjacking, and that if the Dukes can help them recover the rest of the money, they can clear Kate's name. The only problem is that Kate is not Phill's sister, she's his wife, and she, Tommy and Phill are all three responsible for the highjacking. Guest starring: Rick Hill as Phil Ackley; Sam Melville as Tommy Dunkirk; Simone Griffeth as Sandra Rhodes/Kate Ackley. Recurring guests: Peggy Rea as Lulu Coltrane Hogg; Nedra Volz as Emma Tisdale. Celebrity speed trap guest: Roy Orbison, who performs "Oh, Pretty Woman".
58	20	"The Hack of Hazzard"	Paul Baxley	Len Kaufman	April 3, 1981	167138
To help out family friend Emma Tisdale (Nedra Volz) when she goes to visit her mother, Bo and Luke take over daily operations of her taxicab service, while Daisy and Jesse run the Hazzard post office. The Duke boys' first clients are two men named J. J. Sunday (Peter Breck) and Harry Ray Pearson (Royce D. Applegate) who have stolen a $100,000 gold certificate. When Rosco approaches the taxi to give the Duke boys a ticket, the crooks hide the certificate in the backseat. Later, Cooter sends the seat to be re-upholstered, finding the certificate and mailing it. Now the crooks are targeting Daisy, who is transporting the outgoing mail. Guest starring: Peter Breck as J. J. Sunday; Royce D. Applegate as Harry Ray Pearson. Recurring guest: Nedra Volz as Emma Tisdale.
59	21	"The Canterbury Crock"	Dick Moder	Bruce Howard	April 10, 1981	167137
After buying a vase at Emma Partridge's yard sale, in which Emma Partridge (Elizabeth Kerr) is hoping to make enough money to pay off her mortgage to Boss Hogg, the Dukes find themselves being harassed by Mr. Beckman (Byron Webster), a big-time buyer, because the vase is actually worth a fortune. Mr. Beckman will stop at nothing to get the vase, and things get worse when Boss Hogg tries to cut himself in on the deal, after learning that Mr. Beckman is willing to pay at least $50,000 for the vase. Guest starring: Byron Webster as Mr. Beckman; Elizabeth Kerr as Emma Partridge; David Graf as Maury.

=== Season 4 (1981–82) ===
In this season, starting with "Goodbye, General Lee" Warner Bros. starts producing the "General Lee" chargers where we start seeing the light tan interiors, wide push bar and more consistent appearances.

No. overall	No. in season	Title	Directed by	Written by	Original release date	Prod. code
60	1	"Mrs. Daisy Hogg"	John Florea	Si Rose	October 9, 1981	167406
When Boss Hogg's rich, polite nephew Jamie Lee Hogg (Jonathan Frakes), the son of Boss Hogg's youngest brother, comes to Hazzard County to buy the grits mill, Daisy and Jamie Lee fall in love with each other. Their romance progresses quickly, and it is not long before Jamie Lee and Daisy are planning a trip to the altar. But because Jamie Lee's last name is Hogg, Bo and Luke do some investigating. They find out that Jamie Lee is working with a counterfeiter named Roy Landry (Roger Robinson), but Daisy has already left to meet Jamie Lee at the grits mill to elope. It is up to Bo and Luke to rescue Daisy from Jamie Lee and the counterfeiters. Guest starring: Jonathan Frakes as Jamie Lee Hogg; Roger Robinson as Roy Landry; Douglas Hume as Floyd; Hank Underwood as Mr. Pruitt.
61	2	"Double Dukes"	Paul Baxley	Martin Roth	October 16, 1981	167403
After purchasing a fake General Lee and masks made to look like the Duke boys, Boss Hogg hires two men named Turk (Robin Strand) and Moody (Morgan Stoddard), who using the masks and fake General Lee, rob an armored car of $250,000, framing Bo and Luke for it. In order to clear themselves, Bo and Luke must find and capture Turk and Moody, which proves to be harder than expected when Sheriff Little (Don Pedro Colley) gets in on the case. Guest starring: Robin Strand as Turk/fake Bo Duke; Morgan Stoddard as Moody/fake Luke Duke. Recurring guests: Don Pedro Colley as Sheriff Edward Thomas Little; Nedra Volz as Emma Tisdale. Celebrity speed trap guest: Donna Fargo, who performs "Lone Star Cowboy".
62	3	"Diamonds in the Rough"	James Best	Story by : William Raynor & Myles Wilder; Teleplay by : Bruce Howard	October 23, 1981	167408
Bo and Luke find a bag of diamonds hidden in a stuffed Bugs Bunny doll that was parachuted from a hijacked airplane, and they take the diamonds to the Duke farm for safekeeping until they can contact the state police. Lisa (Linda Hart), the leader of the group of thieves who stole the diamonds, follows the Dukes to the farm, claiming to be a reporter, so that she can get her hands on the diamonds. Boss Hogg hears that there is a reward being offered for the recovery of the diamonds, so he tries to get his own hands on the diamonds by sending phony FBI agent Mason (Joseph Whipp) to the farm to get them, under the guise of having a warrant to take the diamonds. Guest starring: Linda Hart as Lisa; Frank Marth as Agent Caldwell; Robert Phillips as Frank; Richard Winterstein as Lenny; Joseph Whipp as Mason. Notes: The Bugs Bunny doll used in the episode was featured very prominently, since Bugs Bunny is of course the most famous cartoon character of Warner Bros.—who, of course, also produces The Dukes of Hazzard. Also, Linda Hart, who played Lisa in the episode, is a former member of the singing group The New Christy Minstrels.
63	4	"Coltrane vs. Duke"	Don McDougall	Simon Muntner	October 30, 1981	167409
A beer distributor offers Boss Hogg top dollar for the Duke farm. After Bo and Luke unintentionally run Rosco off the road, Boss Hogg forms what he believes is the perfect plan to get his hands on the Duke farm—have Rosco fake being injured, and file a $50,000 personal injury lawsuit against the Dukes, so that Rosco can win the Duke farm for Boss. Boss hires an actor named Slick Doggins (Bob Hastings) to play a doctor to support Rosco's claims. As it turns out, it is Boss who suffers, as Rosco, playing his "victim" part to the hilt, forces Boss to wait on him hand and foot. When the Dukes get proof that Rosco is faking his injuries, they have to get that evidence to Judge Buford Potts (Barney Phillips) before they lose the farm. Guest starring: Bob Hastings as Slick Doggins; Hugh Gillin as Mr. Christal; Barney Phillips as Judge Buford Potts; Charlie Dell as Emery Potter; Parley Baer in his first appearance as Doc Appleby. Recurring guest: Don Pedro Colley as Sheriff Edward Thomas Little.
64	5	"The Fugitive"	Don McDougall	Kristan Kincade	November 3, 1981	167142
As the Dukes are helping Bo prepare for the Tri-Counties Motocross motorcycle race, an attractive drifter named Mindy Lou Hale (Laurette Spang) overhears Boss and Rosco talking about stealing motorcycles from the competitors, repainting them, and shipping them to Leroy Dibbs (G. Yon), so Leroy can sell them. Because of that, Boss wants Mindy Lou out of the way, so he orders Rosco to arrest her, but she escapes from Rosco and is found by the Dukes, who try to help her. Guest starring: Laurette Spang as Mindy Lou Hale; G. Yon as Leroy Dibbs. Celebrity speed trap guest: Johnny Paycheck, who performs "Take This Job and Shove It". Paycheck actually lip-syncs the original recording of the song.
65	6	"The Great Bank Robbery"	Denver Pyle	Fred Freiberger	November 6, 1981	167407
Boss Hogg, who is unwilling to pay longtime Hazzard Bank employee Clarence Stovall (Bill Erwin) his $30,000 pension, fires him one day short of retirement. Clarence decides that he will get his pension whether the greedy Boss Hogg likes it or not. Instead of filing a wrongful termination lawsuit to expose Boss Hogg's unwillingness to pay his pension, Clarence angrily takes the $30,000 from the Hazzard Bank, which is owned by Boss Hogg. Jesse, who is a friend of Clarence, learns about it, and he tries to set Clarence straight while Bo and Luke, knowing that Boss would have Clarence arrested by Rosco, try to find a way to put the money back where it was, without getting spotted. Guest starring: Bill Erwin as Clarence Stovall; Daniel Currie as Homer Snead; Dan Priest as Bib Tucker.
66	7	"Sadie Hogg Day"	John Florea	Si Rose	November 13, 1981	167402
Boss Hogg is in a jam when he hears that a state bank examiner named L. S. Handley (John Hancock) is coming to Hazzard to inspect the county ledger. Boss is nervous because he has embezzled exactly $142,679 in county funds. But luckily for Boss, it is the annual Sadie Hogg Day, the day of the year when women occupy Hazzard County's government positions. Boss Hogg fixes it so that Daisy becomes the honorary county treasurer for the day, so he can frame Daisy for the embezzlement, which would make the missing county funds Daisy's problem, instead of Boss Hogg's problem. The Dukes have to crack Boss Hogg's cover-up before Daisy ends up behind bars. Guest starring: John Hancock as L.S. Handley; Mary Treen as Aunt Clara Coltrane; Paul Coufos as Bank Robber (uncredited). Recurring guests: Nedra Volz as Emma Tisdale; Peggy Rea as Lulu Coltrane Hogg.
67	8	"10 Million Dollar Sheriff: Parts 1 & 2"	Dick Moder	William Raynor & Myles Wilder	November 20, 1981	167401A
68	9	"10 Million Dollar Sheriff: Parts 1 & 2"	Dick Moder	William Raynor & Myles Wilder	November 20, 1981	167401B
Rosco inherits $10,000,000 from his great-uncle Hosiah Coltrane, and before he even gets the money, he starts spending it like crazy: he buys a Rolls-Royce patrol car, buys gaudy rhinestone suits, and speaks his mind freely to Boss Hogg. Rosco, frustrated by years of being outfoxed by Bo and Luke, offers Jason Steele (William Smith), the meanest bounty hunter in Georgia, $100,000 to track down Bo and Luke, and make sure that they are put in prison. Steel and his partner Dawson (Alan Autry) arrive in Hazzard, and start pursuing Bo and Luke. As Bo and Luke repeatedly slip out of Steele's grasp, Rosco swindles Boss Hogg out of everything he owns when Boss Hogg's crooked poker game backfires. Jesse learns that Steele has been in trouble with the law before, and while Jesse is trying to track Steele down, Jesse takes a fall down a hill, and hits his head. Rosco lets Boss Hogg earn some money by hiring Boss as a deputy. At the same time, Jesse is at a hospital, in a coma, because of Steele and Dawson, and a furious Bo and Luke are trying their best to outwit Steele, who proves to be a tough enemy. Rosco, feeling guilty about what happened to Jesse, starts having second thoughts about his plan to have Steele nail Bo and Luke. Steele, wanting to protect his reputation, insists on continuing with the plan. Steele cons Bo and Luke into driving a stolen Dodge Charger painted exactly like the General Lee, and has them arrested. It turns out that Rosco's inheritance is not what he thought it was—Hosiah Coltrane's attorney tells Rosco that a computer error put the decimal in the wrong place, and that his inheritance is only $10. Boss Hogg gets back everything he lost from Rosco, and regains the position of County Commissioner. Rosco is in trouble with Steele, who wants the $100,000 that he feels Rosco owes him, while Steele is trying to take Bo and Luke to Atlanta to face the car-theft charge that he framed them on. When Rosco tells Steele that he will not be able to pay him, Steele blows his top. Steele releases Bo and Luke without the use of a car, and kidnaps Rosco, hoping to get Boss Hogg to pay him $100,000 for Rosco, but Boss Hogg, not realizing what is going on, refuses to hand over the money, because of how Rosco had treated him. When Cooter gets the General Lee to Bo and Luke, they set off after Steele and Dawson, while Jesse recovers. Guest starring: William Smith as Jason Steele; Alan Autry as Dawson; Redmond Gleeson as Ben Wilkenson; Regis Cordic as Mr. Reynolds; Terry Wilson as Norman Scroggs; Lindsay Bloom as Mabel Tillingham; Ken Hixon as Dr. Cole. Recurring guest: Don Pedro Colley as Sheriff Edward Thomas Little. Alan Autry was credited under the name Carlos Brown.
69	10	"Trouble at Cooter's"	Don McDougall	Bruce Howard	November 27, 1981	167404
A pair of fur thieves named Russ Mitchell (Steve Sandor) and Bonnie Lane (Colleen Camp) come to Hazzard to sell Boss Hogg some stolen mink coats. But they lost one of the coats on the highway, so Boss shortchanges them by the price of the lost coat. Determined to get the coats back for that loss of money, Mitchell plans on breaking into the storage room where Boss put the coats by going through a hole in the wall at Cooter's Garage, while Bonnie uses her charms to distract Cooter. Guest starring: Steve Sandor as Russ Mitchell; Colleen Camp as Bonnie Lane; Jay Garner as Harvey Dunsmore.
70	11	"Goodbye, General Lee"	Denver Pyle	William Raynor & Myles Wilder	December 4, 1981	167410
Boss Hogg is anxious to win the first annual Hazzard County Drag 'n' Fly Derby so he can clean up on endorsements, and the only thing standing in his way is the General Lee. When the Dukes lose a race to another car, a discouraged Luke makes an offhanded remark about the General Lee possibly wearing out its usefulness, and Boss Hogg hears about what Luke said. After Luke is injured during the qualifying jump for the derby, Boss Hogg hires Professor Crandall (Walker Edmiston) to hypnotize Luke into believing that the General Lee is no longer roadworthy the next time it breaks down, so that he will get rid of the General Lee, no matter who tries to stop him. Boss Hogg thinks that getting rid of the General Lee will ensure victory at the derby. To speed up the process, Boss Hogg orders Rosco to sabotage the General Lee by sneaking on the Duke farm to damage its fuel line, causing another "breakdown" so that Luke will get rid of it. After the General malfunctions, Luke, now under hypnosis, decides to take the General Lee to a local used car dealership to trade it, much to the dismay of the Duke family. Bo, Daisy, and Jesse do not want to get rid of the General Lee, because it is part of the family. Boss Hogg buys the General from the dealership and arranges to have it demolished. While on a call, Cooter notices the unmanned runaway General Lee coasting toward a cliff to meet its would-be doom, but he saves the General Lee by stopping it with his tow truck. Luke even tries to blow up the General Lee with dynamite. While arguing with Bo, Jesse, and Daisy, Luke hears Jesse snap his fingers (the sound implemented by Professor Crandall to break Luke's hypnosis), and Luke shows a complete change in his opinions of the General Lee. Having figured out what happened, Bo and Luke rush to reclaim the General Lee, and afterwards, they enter it into the derby and win, which infuriates Boss Hogg. The first episode where viewers start seeing the WB built General Lees, sporting a wider push bar, light tan interiors & graphics updates Guest starring: Paul Smith as Hobie Harkins; Andy Wood as Banyon; Walker Edmiston as Professor Crandall; Patrick Wright as Spanner.
71	12	"Cletus Falls in Love"	John Florea	Si Rose	December 11, 1981	167412
Cletus initiates a traffic stop with the Dukes. When Daisy uses her charms to get Bo and Luke out of a phony ticket, Cletus thinks that Daisy is in love with him. Daisy tries to end Cletus' courting of her without hurting him. Boss Hogg is upset when he is told that the state probation supervisor is coming to Hazzard to see what kind of a job Boss is doing. In order to impress the supervisor, Boss needs a conviction against Bo and Luke so he can continue to receive a big paycheck as the Hazzard County probation officer. To do that, Boss frames Bo and Luke for passing a bad check, and they must once again clear their names. Boss Hogg fires Cletus after he bungles an arrest, prompting Cletus to side with the Dukes in their efforts to clear their names. To make sure Boss's scheme goes according to plan, he brings in Chickasaw County Sheriff "Big Ed" Little to guard a jailed Bo and Luke until they can be taken to the state probation supervisor. Daisy eventually tells Cletus that she is not in love with him (Cletus takes it well and begins dating another woman), and Bo and Luke get some unexpected help from Flash, who clears Bo and Luke by eating Boss Hogg's forged check. Guest starring: Lila Kent as Laverne; Paul Kent as Mr. Hodges. Recurring guests: Nedra Volz as Miz Tisdale; Don Pedro Colley as Sheriff Edward Thomas Little.
72	13	"Hughie Hogg Strikes Again"	Hollingsworth Morse	William Raynor & Myles Wilder	December 18, 1981	167405
Hughie Hogg (Jeff Altman) sneaks back into Hazzard County, and talks Boss Hogg into not kicking him out of town for what he did to Boss a year ago. This time, Hughie has a scheme that is too good for Boss to refuse. For $25,000, Hughie plans to frame Cooter for robbery so that Boss can use his power of eminent domain to foreclose on Cooter's garage and tear it down to build "Hoggominiums", the condos that Boss has always wanted to build. Guest starring: Pat Studstill as Barclay; Roger Torrey as Norris; Ed Peck as Agent Roy Winters. Recurring guests: Jeff Altman as Hughie Hogg; Nedra Volz as Miz Tisdale. Celebrity speed trap guest: Buck Owens, who performs "I've Got a Tiger By the Tail". Note: Happy Days fans may remember Ed Peck, who played Agent Roy Winters in this episode. He had a recurring role on Happy Days as the gang's nemesis Officer Kirk.
73	14	"Dukescam Scam"	Denver Pyle	Bruce Howard	January 1, 1982	167140
Boss Hogg makes another attempt to get his hands on the Duke farm. Boss and Rosco fake the robbery of the Hazzard Bank, and Rosco locks Boss up. Out of pity, and to repay a debt among old friends, Jesse decides to bail Boss out of jail. Boss cons Jesse into putting the Duke farm up as bail. As part of the plan, if Boss jumps bail, the farm will be forfeited to the county bail bondsman—Boss Hogg himself. Boss does jump bail, but he might not get to enjoy his victory after he and Jesse end up locked in the bank's vault with only an hour's worth of air. Bo and Luke have to find a way to get them out before their time is up, and convince Boss to end the scam. With the vault on a time-lock, Bo and Luke frantically search for bank employee Emery Potter (Charlie Dell), the only one besides Boss who knows the combination to the vault. Guest starring: Charlie Dell as Emery Potter; Barney Phillips as Judge Buford Potts; Lila Kent as Laverne.
74	15	"The Sound of Music – Hazzard Style"	Hollingsworth Morse	Martin Roth	January 8, 1982	167411
Boss is excited about the Mickey Gilley charity concert at Hazzard Square, and it is not because of the music, but because of money. Boss is working with Heep (Burton Gilliam) and Morton (L. Q. Jones), a pair of recording pirates who are making a recording of the concert so that they can sell it. When running from federal agents Marjorie Dane (Elinor Donahue) and Ben Jordan (Hari Rhodes), Heep and Morton highjack Bo and Luke in the General Lee. Bo and Luke manage to fight Heap and Morton off, but what Bo and Luke don't know is that Heep and Morton have left a tape of the concert in the backseat of the General Lee. Boss Hogg uses the tape to frame Bo and Luke. The Dukes work together to capture Heep and Morton in order to clear Bo and Luke. Boss later cons Mickey into a performance at the Boar's Nest with his celebrity speed trap. Guest starring: Mickey Gilley as himself; LQ Jones as Morton; Burton Gilliam as Heep; Elinor Donahue as Agent Marjorie Dane; Hari Rhodes as Agent Ben Jordan.
75	16	"Shine On, Hazzard Moon"	Paul Baxley	Bruce Howard	January 15, 1982	167413
Boss Hogg wants Jesse's famous moonshine recipe so he can sell it to Jasper Fenwick (Jim B. Baker), the biggest moonshine distributor in Georgia. When Jesse refuses to give it to him, Boss hires a crooked magician to frame Bo and Luke for stealing money intended for the orphanage, and then Boss asks Jesse for the moonshine recipe in exchange for the release of Bo and Luke. Bo and Luke will have to escape from jail and get to Jesse before Boss can succeed with his plan. Guest starring: Jim B. Baker as Jasper Fenwick; Michael Keenan as Rayford Flicker; Jim Boeke as Eli. Recurring guest: Don Pedro Colley as Sheriff Edward Thomas Little.
76	17	"Pin the Tail on the Dukes"	Don McDougall	Bruce Howard	January 22, 1982	167414
When the State Highway commission gives Boss Hogg $10,000 for radar guns, Boss buys hair driers made to look like radar guns so he can pocket the $10,000. Meanwhile Jesse's old friend Hector Farley (Henry Jones), who has just returned to Hazzard after 10 years in prison, is determined to make Boss Hogg pay for the farm that Boss conned him out of years ago. Not wanting to part with any of his money, Boss uses every dirty trick he can think of in his attempts to send Hector back to prison, while at the same time, Boss also frames Bo and Luke for the destruction of county property: Rosco's fake radar gun. Guest starring: Henry Jones as Hector Farley; John Wheeler as Mr. Rhuebottom.
77	18	"Miz Tisdale on the Lam"	John Florea	Si Rose	January 29, 1982	167417
Boss has a scam running through the mail to sell non-existent properties, and when state postal inspector Sue Ann Blake (Diane Lander) comes to Hazzard, Boss frames Hazzard postmaster Emma Tisdale (Nedra Volz) for the whole thing. The Dukes hide Emma while they try to clear her name, but the Dukes end up on the run themselves. Now they have to save Emma and themselves from Boss and Sue Ann. Not only that, but Emma has fallen for Jesse. Guest starring: Diane Lander as Postal Inspector Sue Ann Blake; James Hong as Billy Joe Fong; Sid Haig as Slocum; George Whiteman as Nelson. Recurring guest: Nedra Volz as Emma Tisdale.
78	19	"Nothin' But the Truth"	Hollingsworth Morse	Martin Roth	February 5, 1982	167415
Boss Hogg is running a crooked casino in Hazzard County. When the state starts a gambling probe, Boss decides to cover for himself by framing the Dukes for possession of gambling devices. Just as he is about to celebrate his success, Boss accidentally sits on a syringe filled with truth serum—which Rosco collected along with other police gadgetry while away at a police convention in Atlanta—and inadvertently injects himself with it. The serum causes Boss to cross his partners by talking too much about the casino, and they will stop at nothing to silence him. In order to clear their names, the Dukes have to get to Boss before his partners can silence him permanently. Boss, under the effects of the truth serum, reveals to Lulu the real reasons he married her, angering her as well. Guest starring: Craig Littler as Lacey; Roger Hampton as Special Investigator Gorman; Curtis Taylor as Jacks. Recurring guest: Peggy Rea as Lulu Coltrane Hogg.
79	20	"Dear Diary"	Don McDougall	Bruce Howard	February 12, 1982	167416
Rosco loses his diary on the Duke farm, and Boss Hogg blows his top because the diary is filled with notes on every scam that he and Rosco ever pulled. Jesse tries to deliver the diary to Boss and Rosco, but Hadley (Bill McLaughlin) and Avery (Ernie Hudson), two crooks that Boss Hogg swindled, steal the diary and demand $25,000—or they will give the diary to the authorities. Boss Hogg plans to use Bo and Luke to get the diary back by blackmailing them with his big book of trumped-up charges against all the Dukes. The diary ends up getting burned up in a car crash, while much to the dismay of Boss Hogg, the book of trumped-up charges, which took Boss Hogg 20 years to build up, ends up getting shredded in a tree company's woodchipper. In this Episode the General Lee in a few shots has a distinct "01" on the Passenger side door Guest starring: Bill McLaughlin as Hadley; Ernie Hudson as Avery; Elmore Vincent as Doc Appleby.
80	21	"New Deputy in Town"	Denver Pyle	Si Rose	February 19, 1982	167418
A shapely, cajoling, conniving blonde named Linda May Barnes (Tracy Scoggins) is hired as Boss Hogg's new deputy after she easily arrests Bo and Luke on various traffic charges. Boss and Rosco are too distracted by Linda May's sex appeal to notice why she accepted the job—her boyfriend, Rafe Logan (Terence Knox), who faces trial on murder and robbery charges, is scheduled to stay overnight at the Hazzard County Jail on the way to where he will be put on trial, and she and Rafe's brother Denny (Gary Graham) plan to free him from the marshal (Rayford Barnes) who is transporting him. Bo and Luke try to stop Linda May and Denny before they can help Rafe escape. Guest starring: Tracy Scoggins as Linda May Barnes; Gary Graham as Denny Logan; Terence Knox as Rafe Logan; Rayford Barnes as U.S. Marshal Ken Collins. Recurring guest: Peggy Rea as Lulu Coltrane Hogg.
81	22	"Birds Gotta Fly"	Paul Baxley	William Raynor & Myles Wilder	February 26, 1982	167419
Daisy is offered a job to race on the NASCAR circuit for Molly Hargrove (Andra Akers) after Molly sees Daisy beat Bo and Luke in a friendly race through the woods by taking a short cut. But Molly got a loan from Boss Hogg, who hires two crooks to see to it that Molly cannot pay off the loan, which would force Molly to offer Daisy's contract to Boss Hogg. Also, the Dukes learn that Molly was expelled from NASCAR for reckless driving, and she wants Daisy to win at any cost. Can Bo, Luke, and Jesse help Daisy out of this mess? Guest starring: Andra Akers as Molly Hargrove; Alex Harvey as Morgan; Carl Kraines as Jude Porter; Mike Moroff as Sam Porter; Randal Patrick as Charlie Cooper Jr.
82	23	"Bad Day in Hazzard"	Gabrielle Beaumont	William Raynor & Myles Wilder	March 5, 1982	167420
A group of armed robbers and their leader, Mr. Thackery (Tim O'Connor), take over the Boar's Nest with the Dukes, Rosco, Cletus, Cooter, and Boss Hogg as hostages, so Thackery and his men can evacuate the town under false pretenses, and then rob an armored truck that is carrying $10,000,000 to the Hazzard Bank. Thackery soon learns that capturing a Duke is a lot easier than holding on to one. Guest starring: Tim O'Connor as Mr. Thackery; Kaz Garas as Loggins; Mark Withers as Dennis; M. C. Gainey as Peters; Frederic George as Adams.
83	24	"Miss Tri-Counties"	Paul Baxley	William Raynor & Myles Wilder	March 12, 1982	167421
The annual Miss Tri-Counties pageant is under way. It consists of beauty, racing, and mechanical ability. One of Daisy's opponents is Melanie Dubois (Danone Simpson), the girlfriend of Big Jim Mathers (Joe Higgins), the commissioner of Hatchapee County. Mathers pays Boss Hogg $10,000 to make sure Melanie wins. Boss does everything he can to rig the racing and mechanical knowledge competition parts of the pageant, but Daisy wins both of them. Daisy wants to make sure to show up for the final part of the pageant—the swimsuit competition—but Boss Hogg tries to stop her. Daisy makes it to the competition, and wins. Guest starring: Joe Higgins as Big Jim Mathers; Danone Simpson as Melanie Dubois; Charles Bartlett as Grogan; Don Fox Green as Malone; Robert Lussier as Motorist. Recurring guest: Don Pedro Colley as Sheriff Edward Thomas Little.
84	25	"Share and Share Alike"	Denver Pyle	Martin Roth	March 19, 1982	167422
Bo and Luke stumble upon a bag full of stolen credit cards that two thieves named Dickens (David Hayward) and Clark (Billy Ray Sharkey) stashed away. When Boss Hogg gets his hands on the cards, he plans to sell the cards, and frame the Dukes for the theft of the cards. Lulu decides that it is time for the women of Hazzard to take their place beside the men, whether the men like it or not, so she forms the Hazzard Equal Rights Society (HERS), and Daisy joins Lulu. Lulu tries to take over half of Boss Hogg's business interests, including his used car lot, and she ends up selling a car to Sheriff Little—unaware that Boss Hogg has hidden the stolen credit cards in one of the car's door panels. Guest starring: David Hayward as Dickens; Billy Ray Sharkey as Clark; Jon Locke as Mr. Murkin. Recurring guests: Peggy Rea as Lulu Coltrane Hogg; Don Pedro Colley as Sheriff Edward Thomas Little.
85	26	"The Law and Jesse Duke"	James Sheldon	Bruce Howard	March 26, 1982	167423
When Rosco and Cletus become fed up with Boss' refusal to give them a pay raise and overtime payments, they decide to go on strike. Jesse is appointed acting sheriff. Boss hires some crooks led by Alabama Jones (Melinda Naud) to steal TV sets from stores so that he can sell them at an inflated price, and he frames Bo and Luke for it. Now, Bo and Luke must clear their names, and outrun Jesse at the same time. When Jesse figures out the scheme, he helps Bo and Luke go after the crooks. Guest starring: Melinda Naud as Alabama Jones; Ralph Strait as Otis Plunkett; Charles Hoyes as Simon Jones; Doug Heyes as Floyd Jones.
86	27	"Dukes in Danger"	Don McDougall	Si Rose	April 2, 1982	167424
For the second time in a matter of weeks, friends and enemies are forced to band together to defeat a common threat. A prison car that is escorting two convicts, Leeman (Steven Williams) and Hammer (Bill Fletcher), has an accident, and Leeman and Hammer escape. They go to the Duke farm, where Jesse is preparing to drive into town to make his mortgage payment to Boss Hogg, and they take the Dukes hostage. Their car keys are confiscated, and all their communication devices are disabled. With Boss Hogg getting impatient about the mortgage payment, Boss and Rosco go to the farm to collect the payment, and they become hostages too. Everyone is forced to improvise and cooperate while trying to get the attention of Cooter and Cletus, the only two people who are free to rescue them. Guest starring: Steven Williams as Leeman; Bill Fletcher as Hammer; John Crawford as Officer Randall.

=== Season 5 (1982–83) ===
- Byron Cherry and Christopher Mayer were promoted to opening titles starting with this season.
- Beginning with season 5, over a royalties dispute, John Schneider (Bo Duke) and Tom Wopat (Luke Duke) were fired from the series. Their characters were replaced by their cousins Coy Duke and Vance Duke. The show's ratings nosedived and, after 18 episodes, Wopat and Schneider were hired back. As a result, they both ended up starring again in the remaining 4 episodes of the season.
- Vance and Coy last appear in episode 19, and are not even mentioned after their departure from the series.
- According to the series bible, Luke and Bo's 18-episode absence was due to their competing (and, ultimately, winning big) in the NASCAR circuit. Their return episode has the distinction of featuring all four Duke boys, as a way to make a natural transition and maintain the continuity of the series.
- This season consists of 22 episodes.
- Sonny Shroyer returns as Enos for the rest of the series after the cancellation of the spin-off Enos.

No. overall	No. in season	Title	Directed by	Written by	Original release date	Prod. code
87	1	"The New Dukes"	Paul Baxley	William Raynor & Myles Wilder	September 24, 1982	167702
Bo and Luke have left Hazzard to fulfill a lifelong dream of racing on the NASCAR Circuit. Boss Hogg is so happy about it that he unleashes his ultimate secret weapon: the Mean Green Machine. It is a monstrous vehicle which is part of Boss Hogg's plan to rob the Bank of Capitol City. But the robbery of the Bank of Capitol City is just a test run of the Mean Green Machine. Boss's actual plan for the Mean Green Machine is much bigger than a bank robbery. Boss and two men that he hired, Josh Scroggins (William Russ) and Hatfield (Mitch Carter), have a money printing press hidden away, and they have the right paper to print money on, but they need engraving plates to print the money with. An armored truck that will be passing through Hazzard County has U.S. Mint plates in it that will print $100 bills, and Boss plans to have Scroggins and Hatfield use the Mean Green Machine to hijack the armored truck so that they can get the plates. But Boss is unaware that Bo and Luke's cousins Coy and Vance have returned to Hazzard after a six-year absence, to help Jesse and Daisy run the Duke farm. Also, Enos returns to Hazzard from Los Angeles, and is sworn in as a deputy by Rosco, which gives Rosco two deputies: Cletus and Enos. Guest starring: William Russ as Josh Scroggins; Mitch Carter as Hatfield. Note: John Schneider and Tom Wopat are not in the first 18 episodes of season 5, so in this episode Bo and Luke had a cameo, but their stunt doubles played them while driving the General Lee in the start of this episode.
88	2	"Dukes Strike it Rich"	Don McDougall	Jim Rogers	October 1, 1982	167701
Boss Hogg swindles newlyweds Jeb (Jay W. Baker) and Carrie Morton (Phillis Hall) into buying a worthless piece of land next to the Duke farm, so the Dukes try to help the Mortons by scamming Boss Hogg, cleverly making it look like they have found gold on the property so that Boss Hogg will buy the property back. Guest starring: Jay W. Baker as Jeb Morton; Phyllis Hall as Carrie Morton; John Wheeler as Mr. Rhuebottom.
89	3	"Lawman of the Year"	Denver Pyle	William Raynor & Myles Wilder	October 8, 1982	167703
Boss Hogg hires two demolition experts, Jack Morris (Duke Stroud) and his sidekick Burnett (Al White), to rob the Hazzard jewelry store, and Coy and Vance check into it while being chased by Cletus and Enos. When Boss sends Rosco to arrest Coy and Vance in order to get them out of the way, Rosco refuses because he has nominated himself for the "Lawman of the Year" award. As it turns out, however, Enos and Cletus are both elected "Lawman of the Year". Guest starring: Al White as Burnett; Duke Stroud as Jack Morris; June C. Ellis as the lady. Recurring guests: Nedra Volz as Emma Tisdale; John Wheeler as Mr. Rhuebottom.
90	4	"Coy Meets Girl"	James Sheldon	Martin Roth	October 15, 1982	167705
Some old friends of Jesse's are moving from Hazzard to Loomis, and Coy and Vance are driving their antiques to their new home in Loomis for them. Coy and Vance are hijacked and robbed by Clooney (George McDaniel) and Potter (Robert Gray), a pair of crooks that Boss Hogg hired to do the hijacking. What no one knows is that a teenage runaway named Bobbie Lee Jordan (Michelle Greene) stowed away in the back of the truck, and she saw the whole thing. Bobbie Lee ends up at the Duke farm, where she has a crush on Coy. Clooney and Potter hear about Bobby Lee witnessing the hijacking, and they will stop at nothing to silence her. Guest starring Michele Greene as Bobby Lee Jordan; George McDaniel as Clooney; Robert Gray as Potter; Conlan Carter as the truck dispatcher.
91	5	"The Hazzardgate Tape"	Bob Sweeney	Bruce Howard	October 22, 1982	167706
Boss Hogg has reaped a bonanza through hijacking, stolen cars, and bootlegging, thanks to a new state highway. But there are other counties that the highway runs through. Sharkey (Earl Montgomery), Hopkins (F. William Parker), and Bowman (William Bramley), the even more corrupt commissioners of three of those counties, want Boss to pay for refusing to share the loot, and their plan is to take over Hazzard County. The Dukes have no choice but to team up with Boss Hogg to save Hazzard County from a fate worse than Boss Hogg. The Dukes let Boss Hogg hide out at the farm until Coy and Vance can expose Sharkey, Hopkins, and Bowman by tape-recording a conversation between them. Guest starring: Earl Montgomery as Boss Sharkey; F. William Parker as Boss Hopkins; William Bramley as Boss Bowman; Anthony De Longis as Norton; James Carrington as Janco. Celebrity speed trap guest: Mel Tillis.
92	6	"Big Daddy"	Hollingsworth Morse	Bruce Howard	October 29, 1982	167704
Boss Hogg frames Coy and Vance by putting a stolen license plate on the General Lee. But Boss calls off the chase when he is told that his father, who is supposedly a Good Samaritan, is coming to Hazzard—and after coming to Hazzard, Big Daddy Hogg (Les Tremayne) has his driver rob Boss Hogg's safe at City Hall. Guest starring Les Tremayne as Big Daddy Hogg; Brion James as Jenkins; Chris Hendrie as Ernie Ashburn; Billy Beck as the Farmer; Ann Nelson as Lady.
93	7	"Vance's Lady"	James Sheldon	Story by : Simon Munter; Teleplay by : Simon Munter & Martin Roth	November 5, 1982	167707
Vance's former girlfriend Jenny Walden (Beth Schaffel) comes to Hazzard to see Vance, and Jenny is being chased by Wade (Gary Grubbs) and Dugan (Taylor Lacher), associates of crooked State Senator Jason W. Maynard (Kirk Scott), who are trying to kill Jenny because she witnessed Senator Maynard embezzling state funds. The Dukes try to convince a terrified Jenny to report Maynard to the Senate Crime Commission. But when Wade and Dugan trick Boss into helping them find Jenny, will it be too much for the Dukes to handle? Guest starring: Beth Schaffel as Jenny Walden; Gary Grubbs as Wade; Taylor Lacher as Dugan; Kirk Scott as Senator Jason W. Maynard; Ella Mae Brown as Bessie Lou.
94	8	"Hazzard Hustle"	Don McDougall	Si Rose	November 12, 1982	167708
Boss Hogg opens up a crooked horse-betting saloon in Rapaho County, and in order to keep himself covered, Boss uses the Duke family's phone line to frame the Dukes for it. Big Billie Tucker (Joy Garrett), the commissioner of Rapaho County, threatens to have Bull (Bruce M. Fischer), her muscle-bound henchman, kill Boss if he does not include her in the scam. Now the Dukes have to outmaneuver Tucker and Bull, and outsmart Boss. Guest starring: Joy Garrett as Big Billie Tucker; Cal Gibson as Swifty Barnes; Bruce M. Fischer as Bull; William O'Connell as Merle.
95	9	"Enos in Trouble"	Paul Baxley	Si Rose	November 19, 1982	167709
Enos' footlocker is shipped back to Hazzard from Los Angeles, and Enos and the Dukes pick it up at the depot, not knowing that a pair of crooks named Carter (Brett Halsey) and Burke (Anthony Eisley) have hidden a fortune in stolen emeralds inside Enos' flashlight, where its batteries are supposed to be. Carter and Burke are in Hazzard to get the emeralds, and to top it off, Boss Hogg hears about the emeralds, and he also wants them. Guest starring: Brett Halsey as Carter; Anthony Eisley as Burke.
96	10	"The Great Insurance Fraud"	Denver Pyle	William Raynor & Myles Wilder	November 26, 1982	167711
Boss Hogg's new insurance fraud scam is threatened when con artist Ward S. Davis (Brian Libby) and his girlfriend Lavinia Grey (Melanie Vincz) pull a phony car accident at Bottomless Lake after buying a $1,000,000 policy from Boss Hogg. Lavinia wants Boss Hogg to give them the $1,000,000. Coy is afraid of driving anymore because he was sideswiped during the fake accident, and he believes that he killed Ward. Vance sets out to figure out what really happened, but he ends up kidnapped. Can Coy overcome his fear of driving in time to help the rest of the Dukes find Ward and Lavinia, and rescue Vance? Guest starring: Melanie Vincz as Lavinia Grey; Brian Libby as Ward S. Davis.
97	11	"A Little Game of Pool"	Mark Warren	William Raynor & Myles Wilder	December 3, 1982	167710
The 37th annual Tri-Counties Amateur Pool Championship at the Boar's Nest is coming up, and Jesse is one of the competitors. Boss Hogg is trying to get his hands on the General Lee so he can sell it to Joe Landis (Frank Pendle) and Don Purcell (Jesse D. Goins), a pair of hijackers who need a good getaway car. Landis and Purcell have put together a list of every payroll shipment in the state, and Boss Hogg's plan is for Landis and Purcell to hijack the shipments, and split them with Boss Hogg. When Landis and Purcell try to steal the General Lee, they are stopped by the Dukes, so Boss Hogg challenges Jesse to a game of pool—Ridge Runner style—and he tricks Jesse into wagering the General Lee. Jesse is a better pool player than Boss is, but Boss still has some dirty tricks up his sleeve, such as naming Chickasaw Thins (Robert V. Barron) as Jesse's opponent, because no one has ever beaten Chickasaw Thins. Jesse loses the General in the game, and now the Dukes have to find the General and get it back from Landis and Purcell, who have painted the General Lee black. Guest starring: Frank Pendle as Joe Landis; Jesse D. Goins as Don Purcell; Robert V. Barron as Chickasaw Thins.
98	12	"The Treasure of Soggy Marsh"	Mark Warren	William Raynor & Myles Wilder	December 10, 1982	167712
Boss Hogg frames Coy, Vance, and Daisy for the theft of his gold cufflinks, has them arrested by Chickasaw County Sheriff Ed Little, and makes Enos busy doing things that do not even need to be done. Boss Hogg wants Enos and the Dukes out of the way so Biff Gregory (John Laughlin) and his accomplice Floyd Pruitt (Andrew Robinson), two men that Boss Hogg made a deal with, can go ahead with their plan to search Soggy Marsh for $500,000 that a man named Kingston robbed from a bank 10 years ago. Instead of keeping them away, Boss's efforts actually spur the Dukes to escape and try to find out what is going on. But when Daisy finds Gregory and Pruitt first, she gets kidnapped, and it is up to Coy, Vance, and Jesse to rescue her. Guest starring: Andrew Robinson as Floyd Pruitt; John Laughlin as Biff Gregory; Don Dolan as the Jailor; Jineane Ford as the Girl. Recurring guests: Don Pedro Colley as Sheriff Ed Little; John Wheeler as Mr. Rhuebottom.
99	13	"The Revenge of Hughie Hogg"	Don McDougall	Martin Roth	December 17, 1982	167713
Rosco is up for re-election, and Boss Hogg has no problem whatsoever supporting Rosco—until Boss Hogg's nephew Hughie Hogg (Jeff Altman) returns to Hazzard to run against Rosco for sheriff. Hughie blackmails Boss into helping Hughie by showing Boss some evidence of a crooked deal that Boss made involving more than $10,000 worth of stolen telephone answering machines—the man who stole them wants Boss to fence them. Knowing that Hughie would be a lot worse than Rosco, the Dukes campaign to get Rosco re-elected. However, since Hughie never plays fair, he has Boss suspend Rosco, and try to arrest the Dukes. The Dukes have to get creative and find a way to outsmart Hughie so they can get Boss back on Rosco's side, and stop Hughie from getting elected. Guest starring: Pat Studstill as Barclay; Roger Torrey as Norris. Recurring guests: Jeff Altman as Hughie Hogg; Peggy Rea as Lulu Coltrane Hogg.
100	14	"The Return of the Mean Green Machine"	Paul Baxley	Martin Roth	January 7, 1983	167714
Boss Hogg plans to use the Mean Green Machine to steal the $1,000,000 Jefferson Davis gold coin collection from the Hazzard Gold and Silver Emporium, but the Machine gets stolen from Boss Hogg's henchmen by Baxter (Joel Bailey) and Hatfield (Mitch Carter), a pair of crooks who plan to use it to steal the gold coin collection themselves. Coy and Vance take on the Machine, and manage to damage it. Baxter and Hatfield need a mechanic to fix it, so they kidnap Cooter and hold him hostage. Coy and Vance recognize Hatfield as one of the men who originally drove the Machine for Boss Hogg a few months ago—Hatfield and Baxter escaped from prison, and now they are after the gold coin collection. Guest starring: Mitch Carter as Hatfield; Joel Bailey as Baxter; Holly Roberts as Bonnie. Recurring guest: Nedra Volz as Emma Tisdale.
101	15	"Ding, Dong, The Boss Is Dead"	Hollingsworth Morse	William Raynor & Myles Wilder	January 21, 1983	167715
Floyd Calloway (R. G. Armstrong) has hired Matt Mallory (Rick Hill) and Lorna Mallory (Barbara Horan) to kill Boss Hogg because 20 years ago, Boss and Calloway were running moonshine together, and when federal agents started closing in on them, Boss turned state's evidence against Calloway so Boss could avoid prosecution. Feeling that Boss is in danger, the Dukes help Boss, and they plan to make Calloway think that Boss is dead. That way, Calloway and the Mallorys will leave Boss alone. Guest starring: Barbara Horan as Lorna Mallory; Rick Hill as Matt Mallory; R.G. Armstrong as Floyd Calloway; Annie O'Donnell as Gussie Peabody. Recurring guest: Peggy Rea as Lulu Coltrane Hogg.
102	16	"Coy vs. Vance"	Sorrell Booke	Si Rose	February 4, 1983	167716
A pair of crooks have been disguising as motorcycle cops and robbing drivers on the roads. Vance suspects that the robbers are Coy's new girlfriend, motorcycle stuntwoman Billie Ann Baxley (Shawn Weatherly), and her sister Kate Baxley (Bobbie Ferguson), but Coy refuses to believe Vance. It leads to a fight between Coy and Vance, causing Coy to leave the farm. Can Vance convince Coy of the truth? Guest starring: Shawn Weatherly as Billie Ann Baxley; Bobbie Ferguson as Kate Baxley.
103	17	"Comrade Duke"	Don McDougall	William Raynor & Myles Wilder	February 11, 1983	101
A Russian gymnastics team passing through Hazzard stops at Cooter's garage to get their bus serviced. The team's star gymnast, Natasha (Dawn Jeffory), escapes and hides out in the bed of Jesse's pickup truck in the hopes that she can get to Detroit, Michigan, where she has relatives. Problem is, a group of KGB officials and their leader, Borov (Hank Garrett), were on the bus to prevent anyone on the bus from defecting. The Dukes, always glad to help out anyone in need, find Natasha in the bed of Jesse's truck, and they decide to help her escape from Borov, who will stop at nothing to find her, and he even seeks the help of Boss Hogg. Guest starring: Dawn Jeffory as Natasha; Hank Garrett as Agent Borov; Lee Delano as Sergei Androvich; Steve Hanks as Darcy Kincaid; Roger Jackson as Pete, the Mechanic.
104	18	"Witness: Jesse Duke"	Hollingsworth Morse	Bruce Howard	February 18, 1983	167718
Boss Hogg is trying to buy gas pumps from a crook named Hanson (Noble Willingham)—gas pumps that would severely overcharge whoever buys gas from Boss Hogg's stations. Jesse is blinded by a blow to the face while trying to stop a bank robbery in Capitol City, and his eyesight might not return. The robbers, Parker (Judson Scott) and his accomplice Rick (Billy Streater), do not want any witnesses, so they go to Hazzard County to track Jesse down, planning to kill him. Coy, Vance, and Daisy decide to hide Jesse at Boss Hogg's house while they try to stop Parker and Rick. Guest starring: Judson Scott as Parker; Noble Willingham as Hanson; Billy Streater as Rick; Ken Hixon as Dr. Talmadge.
105	19	"Welcome Back, Bo 'n' Luke"	Hollingsworth Morse	Len Kaufman & Myles Wilder	February 25, 1983	167720
Bo and Luke return to Hazzard County after a great season on the NASCAR circuit, where they won in Mobile, Alabama (in storyline; in actuality, the NASCAR-sanctioned track is in Irvington, where it was the home of NASCAR's Grand American and regional series). They wanted to come home because they missed Hazzard County too much to stay away. Coy and Vance have decided to leave Hazzard to take care of their Uncle Elbert and Aunt Bessie's farm while Elbert is in the hospital. As Bo and Luke soon discover, things are still pretty much the same in Hazzard. For the past couple of months, Cooter has been moonlighting at the Chickasaw Garage and getting hardly any sleep—and for a good reason. Boss Hogg has deliberately raised Cooter's mortgage to a balloon payment of $5,000 so Boss can have a reason to foreclose on Cooter's garage, because Boss wants to build a new shopping center in its place. Also, NASCAR driver Petey Willis (Donald May) has come out of retirement to prepare for the Atlanta 500. But Petey's car crashes during a practice run after Cooter worked on it and installed high-performance gas hoses in the engine. Petey's daughter Sarah Ann (Lori-Nan Engler) gets upset and blames Cooter, so a devastated Cooter decides to sell the Hazzard Garage to Boss Hogg, and move to the mountains to become a recluse. Boss tells Rosco to take the Hazzard Garage's deed to Atlanta and record it. Bo and Luke figure out the cause of the crash: the pressure going through the fuel line burst a hole in the line, spraying gas all over the manifold. The Dukes are surprised that the manifold did not burn up. In an attempt to kill Petey, someone removed a high-performance fuel hose that Cooter installed, and installed a low-performance, store-bought fuel line in its place, knowing that it would blow, and cause Petey to wreck. Sarah Ann tells Bo and Luke that Petey's backup driver, Joey Bryan (Chuck Wagner), is not exactly happy about the idea of Petey driving in the Atlanta 500, because Joey himself wants to drive in the Atlanta 500. It was Joey who installed the low-performance fuel line in Petey's car. It turns out that Joey wanted Petey out of the way, because Joey had bet on someone else to win the Atlanta 500, and he stands a good chance of losing the bet unless Petey is out of the race. While Bo and Luke go after Joey, Jesse tells Cooter what is going on, and Daisy comes up with a plan to stop Rosco from recording the deed to the Hazzard Garage. Guest starring: Donald May as Petey Willis; Lori-Nan Engler as Sarah Ann Willis; Chuck Wagner as Joey Bryan; Ken Hixon as Doctor (uncredited). Note: This is the only episode to feature all four Duke boys—Bo, Luke, Coy, and Vance appear in the opening credits. Hit by a dip in the ratings after bringing in Coy and Vance as the new Dukes, Warner Brothers negotiated with Tom Wopat and John Schneider, and they returned to their roles as Bo and Luke Duke.
106	20	"Big Brothers, Duke"	Hollingsworth Morse	Len Kaufman & Myles Wilder	March 4, 1983	167719
Bo and Luke sign up as Big Brothers to Andy Slocum (P. R. Paul), a teenage orphan who steals the General Lee, some hubcaps, and other things. Bo and Luke try to point Andy in the right direction and help him stop stealing things—and then Andy stumbles upon a sack of Boss Hogg's dirty money in an abandoned mine near one of Jesse's abandoned moonshine stills. Andy finds himself on the run from Boss and crooked businessman Barney Benson (William Edward-Phipps), who want the money back. Guest starring: P. R. Paul as Andy Slocum; William Edward Phipps as Barney Benson; Nick Shields as Norman; James Jeter as Sheriff; Robert Broyles as the Man.
107	21	"Farewell, Hazzard"	Don McDougall	Si Rose	March 11, 1983	167721
Boss pulls out all the stops to foreclose or buy all the land in Hazzard County so he and his new business partner, Lisa Sue "L. S." Pritchard (Randi Brooks), who is from Dallas, Texas, can develop "New Hazzard". When the Dukes lose the farm after Pritchard's goons keep them from making their mortgage payment, they look into what Pritchard really wants all that land for. When they find her plans for turning Hazzard County into a strip mine so that she can mine coal, they have to convince Boss of it before Hazzard County becomes a big, empty hole. Guest starring: Randi Brooks as Lisa Sue "L. S." Pritchard; James Horan as Garrett; Joseph Burke as Hudson; Grant Owens as Whitney.
108	22	"Daisy's Shotgun Wedding"	Paul Baxley	Si Rose	March 25, 1983	167722
Bo and Luke have been overprotective towards Daisy ever since they have come back to Hazzard, so Daisy, who is tired of being smothered by Bo and Luke, decides to move into the rooming house that her friend Sally Jo (Jo McDonnell) lives in. The Beaudrys, a moonshining family from a remote part of Tennessee, come into Hazzard to make a moonshine deal with Boss Hogg. After realizing the importance of family, Daisy decides to return to the Duke farm, but Daisy, along with Rosco's dog Flash, is kidnapped by the Beaudrys. The Beaudrys also take $20,000 belonging to Boss Hogg. Milo Beaudry (Richard Moll) wants a dog and a wife, and he wants Daisy to be his wife. Bo, Luke, Jesse, Rosco, and Boss set off to rescue Daisy and Flash. To rescue Daisy and Flash, Bo and Luke must take to the air in a pair of ultralights. When the so-called preacher (Dennis Fimple) arrives, and Daisy is being forced at gunpoint to marry Milo, Bo and Luke show up to rescue Daisy and Flash. Guest starring: Richard Moll as Milo Beaudry; J. S. (Joe) Young as Pa Beaudry; John Dennis Johnston as Sledge Beaudry; Dennis Fimple as Preacher; Steve Hanks as Darcy Kincaid; Glenn Morshower as Vern Cooke; Rick Johnson as Skip; Jo McDonnell as Sally Jo.

=== Season 6 (1983–84) ===
No. overall	No. in season	Title	Directed by	Written by	Original release date	Prod. code
109	1	"Lulu's Gone Away"	Tom Wopat	Len Kaufman & Myles Wilder	September 23, 1983	185101
Lulu is frustrated over Boss Hogg constantly taking her for granted, so she walks out on him. Lulu is invited to stay on the Duke farm for a while, to sort out her emotions, but her stay is short-lived. Lulu is kidnapped by Billy Ray (Chris Mulkey), Anna Lisa (Shanna Reed), and Eddie (Lewis Van Bergen), who demand that Boss pay a $100,000 ransom for her safe return. Billy Ray, Anna Lisa, and Eddie are making that demand because they are fed up with having financial problems. Jesse alerts Bo, Luke, and Daisy about Lulu's disappearance (she had secretly tape-recorded the kidnapping), and the Dukes quickly offer to help Boss Hogg, who is genuinely devastated. However, he rebuffs them, particularly since the kidnappers have threatened to kill Lulu if the Dukes attempt a rescue. The ultimatum causes Bo and Luke (with some help from Cooter) to get creative in coming up with a plan to save Lulu. It leads to a confrontation at the Tri-County Amusement Park, which is set to be opened soon. Lulu helps apprehend the gang when she forces Anna Lisa into the getaway car, and proceeds to sit on her and bounce up and down until Bo and Luke return with Eddie and Billy Ray. Guest starring: Chris Mulkey as Billy Ray; Lewis Van Bergen as Eddie; Shanna Reed as Anna Lisa; Annie O'Donnell as Gussie Peabody. Recurring guest: Peggy Rea as Lulu Coltrane Hogg.
110	2	"A Baby for the Dukes"	Hollingsworth Morse	Si Rose	September 30, 1983	185102
After a family picnic, the Dukes find a baby boy with a note in the General Lee. The note says for the Dukes to take care of the baby until the mother can safely pick him up. The baby's mother turns out to be Mary Lou Tompkins (Janeen Best), whose parents are the Dukes' old friends Bill and Bonnie Tompkins. Mary Lou is in a custody battle against baby Jamie's wealthy, snobby grandfather Emerson P. Craig (Peter Hobbs), who is from Savannah. Emerson wants to keep Jamie away from Mary Lou, just because Mary Lou is a farmer's daughter, and Mary Lou put Jamie in the General Lee in order to keep Jamie away from Emerson. A couple of years ago, Emerson's son Roger married Mary Lou, without Emerson's approval and against Emerson's orders. Not long after Jamie was born, Roger passed away. Emerson did not approve of Mary Lou, because in Emerson's opinion, Mary Lou, who used to work in one of Emerson's cotton mills, is a "nobody" because she was raised on a "grubby" farm. Emerson went to court, and he and his high-priced attorney had Mary Lou declared an unfit mother, and Emerson won custody of Jamie. It is too risky for the Dukes to keep Jamie at the Duke farm, because Emerson has a pair of gun-carrying private investigators looking for Jamie. Daisy volunteers to go into hiding with Jamie at the abandoned Hazzard Sawmill building. Emerson's snobby attitude even angers Boss Hogg and Rosco, so Boss Hogg, Rosco, and Enos try to help the Dukes keep Jamie away from Emerson, and Boss Hogg and Jesse try to locate Judge Charles Druten (Ted Gehring), hoping that he can help. But because of a cut in the county budget, Rosco and Enos have to ride around on horses instead of in cars. Jesse and Boss Hogg locate Judge Druten, and send Bo and Luke to pick him up. When Emerson and his private investigators close in on the Hazzard Sawmill building, and one of the investigators accidentally sets fire to the surrounding woods by throwing down a lit cigar, Bo and Luke, arriving with Judge Druten, have to go into the fire to find Daisy and Jamie. After Bo and Luke rescue Daisy and Jamie from the fire, Jesse, Mary Lou, and Judge Druten help Emerson realize what a fool he has been, and he lets Mary Lou have custody of Jamie. Guest starring: Peter Hobbs as Emerson P. Craig; Janeen Best as Mary Lou Tompkins; Stafford Morgan as Fielding; Ted Gehring as Judge Charles Druten; Gerrit Graham as Baldwin (uncredited). Janeen Best is the daughter of actor James Best, who played Rosco. Michael Damian married Janeen Best in 1998, and James Best appeared in three Damian produced films.
111	3	"Too Many Roscos"	Harvey Laidman	Bruce Howard	October 7, 1983	185104
During a pursuit of the General Lee, another car runs Rosco's off the road and into the Hazzard pond. Rosco climbs out uninjured; but the car's occupants kidnap him. Their leader is a man named Woody (James Best), who underwent plastic surgery to look exactly like Rosco. Bo and Luke see Rosco's car sink into the pond, but, as far as they know, Rosco is not surfacing like he normally does after driving into the pond. When Bo and Luke turn around to check on Rosco and are unable to find him, they fear the worst, and assume that he has drowned. The residents of Hazzard all think Rosco is dead. Later, at Rosco's supposed wake, everyone is overjoyed when they see "Rosco" stumbling down the street, but what they do not know is that it is actually Woody. Woody claims to be Rosco, but he makes enough mistakes to make everyone wonder what is wrong with the person that they think is Rosco. Rosco's dog Flash is not fooled, however, and she will not go anywhere near the phony Rosco. When Bo and Luke take Woody to the hospital, still thinking that he is Rosco, they are grabbed by Woody's accomplices Kelly (Clancy Brown) and Arnie (Jeffrey Josephson). What no one knows is that Woody, Kelly, and Arnie plan to rob an armored truck that is carrying $1,000,000 to the Hazzard Bank, and frame Rosco for the robbery. Woody imprisons the Duke boys and the General Lee in their hideout (where the real Rosco is also being kept) so they cannot interfere with the planned robbery. It becomes a race against time to stop Woody and his accomplices from carrying out the robbery. Guest starring: James Best as Woody; Clancy Brown as Kelly; Jeffrey Josephson as Arnie; Sally Hampton as Sue Ann Hanson (uncredited). Recurring guests: Peggy Rea as Lulu Coltrane Hogg; Parley Baer as Doc Appleby. Note: James Best had a dual role in this episode: his regular role of Rosco and as Woody, Rosco's criminal double.
112	4	"Brotherly Love"	Michael Caffey	Martin Roth	October 14, 1983	185103
Luke's long-lost biological brother Jud Kane (Randy Hamilton) arrives in Hazzard. Luke thought that Jud was killed in a hospital fire as a baby, but it turns out that Jud was rescued by a nurse who raised him as if he was her own son. Jud is now a boxer known as Killer Kane, and he is being chased by Tex Tompkins (Christopher Stone), a crooked gambler who bet all of his money on Jud's opponent in a fight that he wanted Jud to throw. Jud won, after refusing to throw the fight, and Tex took heavy losses as a result. Now, Tex and his sidekick Charlie Burns (Phillip Clark) are out to kill Jud, in order to send a message that no one is ever to cross Tex again, but Jesse, Bo, Luke and Daisy will stop at nothing to keep Jud safe. Tex and Charlie con Boss and Rosco into revealing Jud's whereabouts, then lock them in a holding cell to prevent their interference. Luke later comes up with a plan to fool Tex by driving Jud's car and engaging in a road chase. But Luke is run off the road by Tex and Charlie, and is taken to the Tri-County Hospital. Tex and Charlie, thinking that they have succeeded in killing Jud, go to the Boar's Nest to celebrate, but they overhear Enos telling Daisy that Luke has been injured. Knowing that Jud is still alive, Tex and Charlie renew their pursuit, tracking Jud down at the Tri-County Hospital, where they kidnap Jud, and Bo is unable to stop them. Bo tells Jesse, Luke and Daisy what happened, and then takes off after Tex and Charlie. Luke commandeers an ambulance and runs Tex and Charlie's car off the road and into a lake. The car's occupants are trapped inside as the car plunges to the bottom, and it is up to Bo to rescue Jud, Tex, and Charlie. Guest starring: Randy Hamilton as Jud "Killer" Kane; Christopher Stone as Tex Tompkins; Phillip Clark as Charlie Burns; John Dewey-Carter as Harley; Nancy Jeris as the doctor.
113	5	"The Boar's Nest Bears"	Tom Wopat	Michael Michaelian & Michael Sevareid	October 21, 1983	185108
When Bo and Luke are late for a probation appointment, Boss Hogg tells them that he will let them off the hook if they coach Hazzard's pee wee basketball team, the Boar's Nest Bears. With the help of Jesse, they talk 12-year-old Rod Moffet (Jason Lively), a highly talented basketball player who is shaken by the recent death of his father, into playing for the Bears. Rod lives in Chickasaw County. Boss Hogg wants the Bears to win a championship game against the Chickasaw Chiefs, an undefeated team that Boss Hogg placed a bet against, with Chickasaw County Commissioner A. C. Tate Jr. (Gailard Sartain), who is betting against the Bears. Tate and the Chickasaw Chiefs' head coach Ruel McBride (James Carroll Jordan) are willing to use any dirty trick they can think of, to prevent Rod from playing in the game. Tate even threatens to foreclose on the Moffet farm if Rod plays for the Bears. After a talk with Bo and Luke, Rod decides not to give in to Tate. Bo and Luke are exasperated when they learn about the bet. Just before the game's opening tip-off, Tate presents a seemingly authentic birth certificate to the game administrator, Jesse, falsely claiming that Rod is older than 12. While Luke is coaching the Bears, Bo and Daisy race to the Chickasaw County Courthouse to get the real birth certificate, but they find that, to get there, they must dodge Chickasaw County Sheriff Big Ed Little. Guest starring: Gailard Sartain as A. C. Tate, Jr.; James Carroll Jordan as Ruel McBride; Nancy Clay as Lou Ann Moffet; Jason Lively as Rod Moffet; Bobby Fite as Tommy. Recurring guest: Don Pedro Colley as Sheriff Ed Little. Note: This is Jason Lively's second time acting in The Dukes of Hazzard, after five years since the first episode. Side Note: Gailard Sartain, who played Chickasaw County Commissioner A. C. Tate Jr., was a regular cast member on Hee Haw.
114	6	"Boss Behind Bars"	Don McDougall	Si Rose	November 4, 1983	185109
Pa Beaudry (J. S. (Joe) Young) and his two sons Sledge (John Dennis Johnston) and Milo (Richard Moll) return to Hazzard to take one of Boss Hogg's moonshining stills after the Beaudrys' moonshining still blows up because of Milo. To get Boss Hogg out of the way, the Beaudrys frame him for sabotaging Jesse's car in the Ridgerunner Old Timer's race when Jesse's car flips over. Jesse is not injured, but parts from his car are found in one of Boss Hogg's pockets, and Rosco puts Boss Hogg in jail while the Beaudrys take one of Boss Hogg's stills. When Boss Hogg hears about the theft of his still, he tries to convince Rosco that the Beaudrys framed him to get him out of the way so they could take his still. Jesse rightfully believes Boss Hogg when he says that he would never intentionally cause Jesse any physical harm. The last time the Beaudrys were in Hazzard, they kidnapped Daisy and Flash, and tried to force Daisy to Marry Milo. Bo and Luke investigate the Beaudrys, and it turns out that Pa Beaudry slipped the parts into Boss Hogg's pocket. It leads to a confrontation with the Beaudrys on the Beaudry property, in a remote part of Tennessee. Recurring guests: Richard Moll as Milo Beaudry; John Dennis Johnston as Sledge Beaudry; J. S. (Joe) Young as Pa Beaudry.
115	7	"A Boy's Best Friend"	Sorrell Booke	Len Kaufman & Myles Wilder	November 11, 1983	185110
Terry Lee (Danny Cooksey) is a six-year-old orphan who has become withdrawn since he recently lost his parents in a car crash, and Ira Grant (Wally Taylor), the caretaker at the orphanage, is worried about him. Bo and Luke help Terry Lee by getting him a basset hound from the pound. It turns out to be Maxine, the valuable purebred showdog that was kidnapped from wealthy John J. Hooper (Joe Dorsey) at a dog show, and the kidnappers, a man named B. B. (Billy Ray Sharkey) and his wife Mandy Jo (Jennifer Holmes), have demanded a $25,000 ransom. B. B. had worked for John for eight years, and then John fired him. Maxine escaped and ended up in the pound when B. B. and Mandy Jo came to Hazzard. John and his wife (Toni Sawyer) have posted a $10,000 reward for the return of Maxine. Boss Hogg, who wants the reward, learns that Maxine is at the orphanage and, ignorant of Terry Lee's feelings, Boss Hogg takes her and holds her until John can arrive. B. B. and Mandy Jo mistake Rosco's dog Flash for Maxine, and as a result of that mistake, they kidnap Flash. While everyone is looking for Flash, Boss is still hoping to collect the reward for Maxine. After everything is sorted out, B. B. and Mandy Jo are found, Flash is rescued, and the Hoopers decide to adopt Terry Lee. Guest starring: Jennifer Holmes as Mandy Jo; Billy Ray Sharkey as B. B.; Joe Dorsey as John J. Hooper; Bill McLean as Mr. Winkle; Toni Sawyer as Mrs. Hooper; Wally Taylor as Ira Grant; Danny Cooksey as Terry Lee; June Foray (uncredited) as the voice of Terry Lee Recurring guest: Parley Baer as Doc Appleby. Danny Cooksey played Sam McKinney on Diff'rent Strokes.
116	8	"Targets: Daisy and Lulu"	Bernard E. McEveety	Bruce Howard	November 18, 1983	185111
Daisy and Lulu return from a shopping trip that they took to New Orleans. At the airport, Lulu accidentally picks up a suitcase that is identical to her suitcase, and it turns out to have a stolen $250,000 diamond necklace in it. When the thieves and their boss, Mr. Lipton (Robert Phalen), learn that Lulu and Daisy have the suitcase, they begin pursuing Lulu and Daisy, bent on using whatever means necessary to get the necklace back. Boss Hogg wants the necklace so that he can sell it to his crooked cousin, Big Dan Hogg (Marty Zagon), for $25,000—not realizing how much the necklace is really worth. Bo, Luke and Enos—later joined by Boss and Rosco—devise a plan to trap Lipton and his men, and return the necklace to its owner, knowing that Lipton and his men have threatened to kill Daisy and Lulu if they fail to hand over the necklace, and if any entrapment efforts are detected. Guest starring: Charles Napier as Pete; Robert Phalen as Mr. Lipton; Bruce Glover as Wilbur; Michael Halsey as Mick; Marty Zagon as Big Dan Hogg. Recurring guest: Peggy Rea as Lulu Coltrane Hogg.
117	9	"Twin Trouble"	Paul Baxley	Si Rose	November 25, 1983	185112
After returning from a Marine Corps reunion, Luke chases a woman who robbed a jewelry store in Capitol City, and at the same time, her identical twin sister is with Bo on the side of the road in a different part of the county, which provides an alibi for the twins, Cindy (Randi Brough) and Sandy Ballou (Candi Brough). That causes a feud between Luke and Bo. Luke knows that the woman he chased committed the robbery, and Bo refuses to believe Luke, because Bo thinks that the woman Luke said he chased in Capitol City is the same woman who was on the side of the road with Bo. It becomes a tale of trying to figure out how the same woman could be in two places at once. Things are straightened out when Bo and Luke realize that they are dealing with twins. Also, in an effort to save money, Rosco and Enos get their patrol cars taken away from them by Boss Hogg, who gives them a pair of three-wheel ATVs to drive. Guest starring: Randi Brough as Cindy Ballou; Candi Brough as Sandy Ballou; Sandy Ward as Sheriff Floyd; Ben Thomas as Cash Calloway.
118	10	"Enos' Last Chance"	Ralph Riskin	Story by : Michael Piller; Teleplay by : William Raynor, Myles Wilder and Si Rose	December 2, 1983	185106
While Enos was on the LAPD, he arrested and testified against hit man Frank Scanlon (Don Gordon). Now, Scanlon, who wears a different disguise for each job he does, has escaped from prison and arrived in Hazzard, and he will stop at nothing to make Enos pay for putting him away. The Dukes help Enos capture Scanlon. Rosco's inattention to Scanlon results in an easy escape from the Hazzard jail, and Boss Hogg fires Enos for it. After Scanlon blows up Enos' empty car with a bomb, the Dukes and some of their friends set a trap to stop Scanlon before he can hurt Enos, but Scanlon turns the tables on them, and kidnaps Daisy, figuring that the easiest way to Enos is through Daisy. Scanlon demands that Enos give himself up, alone, or he will kill Daisy. The Dukes and everyone else in Hazzard set out to rescue Enos and Daisy, and help Enos get his job back. Guest starring: Don Gordon as Frank Scanlon; Ritchie Montgomery as Elton Loggins; David Haney as Frank Scanlon as salesman; James Cavan as Clem Boswell (uncredited).
119	11	"High Flyin' Dukes"	Ralph Riskin	Martin Roth	December 9, 1983	185133
Daisy, who has her pilot license, fills in for Hazzard County's crop duster, her boyfriend Joe Ward (Michael Crabtree), when Joe is injured. Boss Hogg has two crooks named Percy (Steven Williams) and Hector (Nick Benedict) secretly mix poisonous lye in the crop duster's pesticide mixer. As Boss had planned, Daisy kills Boss Hogg's crops so Boss can sue the Dukes for damages, in hopes of winning the Duke farm. But Boss Hogg's scheme backfires when Percy and Hector form their own plan: they tell the county's farmers to pay a ransom, or get lye dumped on their crops. The Dukes set out to stop Percy and Hector before Hazzard becomes a wasteland. Guest starring: Steven Williams as Percy; Nick Benedict as Hector; Michael Crabtree as Joe Ward; Bob Aaron as Ned Beemer.
120	12	"Cooter's Girl"	Don McDougall	Si Rose	December 30, 1983	185105
18-year-old Nancy Lou Nelson (Kim Richards) comes to Hazzard to see Cooter, and Nancy Lou turns out to be Cooter's long-lost Biological daughter. Years ago, Cooter and local girl Beverly Hibbs ran away and got married. Back then, Cooter was still somewhat of a wild man. Beverly's father had the marriage annulled, but not before Beverly got pregnant. Because of his wild side, Beverly and Cooter agreed that it would be better if she raised Nancy Lou alone. Now, Cooter tries to be the picture of respectability, but it seems like Cooter just cannot avoid brushes with a pair of strangers named Collins (David Gale) and Buck Morgan (Jack Yates), who are the leaders of a group that is planning to dump toxic waste in Hazzard County. Nancy Lou starts believing that Beverly was right about Cooter, and Nancy Lou plans to leave town. Bo, Luke, and Cooter set out to stop Collins and Morgan, and the Dukes try to help Cooter redeem his image in the eyes of Nancy Lou. When Boss Hogg learns what Collins and Morgan are up to, he makes it clear that he does not want toxic waste in Hazzard County. Guest starring: Kim Richards as Nancy Lou Nelson; David Gale as Collins; Jack Yates as Buck Morgan.
121	13	"Heiress Daisy Duke"	Don McDougall	Len Kaufman & Myles Wilder	January 6, 1984	185114
Private investigator Harry Bobo (Frank Birney) comes to Hazzard with a photo of heiress Vivian Stewart, the long-lost granddaughter of wealthy industrialist Carter Stewart (Lyle Talbot)—who is offering a $200,000 reward to anyone who finds Vivian. It turns out that Vivian looks exactly like Daisy, so Boss Hogg, who wants the reward money, has Professor Crandall (Walker Edmiston) hypnotize Daisy into thinking that she is Vivian. Boss Hogg tricks Harry into thinking that Daisy is Vivian, and they visit Carter. But Vivian's cousins Alan Fairchild (Greg Michaels) and Vonnie Fairchild (Hancy Hinman), who would receive Vivian's inheritance if Vivian is killed, are out to kill Daisy, because they also think Daisy is Vivian. Guest starring: Greg Michaels as Alan Fairchild; Frank Birney as Harry Bobo; Nancy Hinman as Vonnie Fairchild; Lyle Talbot as Carter Stewart. Recurring guest: Walker Edmiston as Professor Crandall.
122	14	"Dead and Alive"	James Best	Story by : Martin Roth & Myles Wilder; Teleplay by : Martin Roth	January 20, 1984	185115
Bo and Luke chase armored truck robbers Phil (Charles Cyphers) and Lenny (Charles H. Hyman) through Chickasaw County, and Sheriff Ed Little mistakes the Dukes for the robbers. The only eyewitness who can clear Bo and Luke is their old friend, local artist Artie Bender (James Cavan)—but Boss Hogg has just hidden Artie away and declared Artie legally dead so that Boss can sell Artie's paintings to an art dealer at inflated prices. Chickasaw County Sheriff "Big Ed" Little continues to pursue Bo and Luke after they escape from jail, as they try to unravel the mystery of whether Artie is really dead. Guest starring: Charles Cyphers as Phil; James Cavan as Artie Bender; Charles H. Hyman as Lenny; Ivor Barry as the art dealer; Rex Knowles as Shill #1; Jane Abbott as Shill #2. Recurring guests: Don Pedro Colley as Sheriff Ed Little; Parley Baer as Doc Appleby.
123	15	"Play it Again, Luke"	Paul Baxley	Len Kaufman & Myles Wilder	January 27, 1984	185116
Country music star Candy Dix (Roberta Leighton), a woman that Luke courted before he enlisted into the Marines, comes to Hazzard to do a concert at the Boar's Nest, and see Luke for the first time in seven years. As the two try to rekindle their romance, Luke finds that Candy has a lot on her mind. Her current boyfriend and manager, Eddie Lee Memphis (Jeff Osterhage), has been very ill-tempered, and his behavior has bordered on being abusive toward Candy. That turns out to be because Memphis owes a gambling debt to a bookie named Mr. Starkey (Ritch Brinkley), who has threatened that he will kill Memphis if the debt is not paid, which has Memphis terrified. The Dukes find that they have to protect Candy from Memphis and his accomplice Hoby Willis (Ned Bellamy), who are out to kill her so Memphis can use her $75,000 life insurance policy to pay off the debt. While the Dukes try to protect Candy, Memphis, trying to prevent any interference, pays a visit to Boss Hogg to ask that Luke be arrested for kidnapping. Guest starring: Roberta Leighton as Candy Dix; Jeff Osterhage as Eddie Lee Memphis; Ned Bellamy as Hoby Willis; Ritch Brinkley as Mr. Starkey. Note: Tom Wopat practices his second career in this episode, showcasing his singing talent.
124	16	"Undercover Dukes (Part 1)"	Paul Baxley	Len Kaufman & Myles Wilder	February 3, 1984	185107A
Bo and Luke are offered a chance to return to the NASCAR circuit, this time racing for Mary Beth Carver (Lydia Cornell), the daughter of crime boss J. J. Carver (Ramon Bieri). Mary Beth is not involved in Carver's operations. Bo and Luke decline, vowing to uphold a promise that they made to Jesse that they would never again leave the farm to return to racing. A Federal Agent named Walden (Herbert Jefferson, Jr.) later approaches Bo and Luke, offering a healthy cash sum for the two to work undercover as race car drivers for Mary Beth, since J. J. Carver is involved in a gambling racket that has involved murder, robbery, and illegal gambling. It is an offer that's too good to pass up, and Bo and Luke agree to work for Walden, who tells them that they cannot tell Jesse and Daisy what they are doing, which leaves a clueless Daisy angry. Daisy berates Bo and Luke for leaving her and Jesse to go back to the NASCAR circuit after they promised not to. She even slaps Bo. Guest starring: Lydia Cornell as Mary Beth Carver; Michael Ensign as Bender; Stepfanie Kramer as Anna Louise; Herbert Jefferson, Jr. as Agent Walden; Ramon Bieri as J. J. Carver; Mike Moroff as Jo Jo; Douglas Hume as Herky; Dennis Haskins as Gate Guard (uncredited); Terry Labonte as Pit crewman (uncredited) Note: The unnamed pit crewman was portrayed by NASCAR driver Terry Labonte, who that November would win the first of his two NASCAR Sprint Cup Series championships. In January 2016, he was inducted to the NASCAR Hall of Fame.
125	17	"Undercover Dukes (Part 2)"	Paul Baxley	Len Kaufman & Myles Wilder	February 10, 1984	185107B
Bo and Luke begin to infiltrate J.J. Carver's organization, compiling evidence to bring him to justice. The Tri-Counties 150 is under way at a track in Capitol City, and Bo is driving Carver's race car, but they get their cover blown—thanks to Boss Hogg and Rosco, who think Bo and Luke are making gambling deals. After tying up Luke, Boss, and Rosco, Carver (Ramon Bieri) sends his henchman Jo Jo (Mike Moroff) to the track with an assignment to kill Bo as soon as Bo crosses the finish line. When Jesse and Daisy show up at the track, Bo, unaware that he is putting Daisy's life in danger, has Daisy secretly take Bo's place in the race so Bo can go to Carver's home and help Luke, Boss, and Rosco, and recover the evidence. Once Carver is brought down, and Bo and Luke are allowed to tell Daisy and Jesse what they were doing, Daisy realizes that she made a mistake in getting angry at Bo and Luke, and she apologizes to them. Guest starring: Lydia Cornell as Mary Beth Carver; Michael Ensign as Bender; Stepfanie Kramer as Anna Louise; Herbert Jefferson, Jr. as Agent Walden; Ramon Bieri as J. J. Carver; Mike Moroff as Jo Jo; Douglas Hume as Herky; Hal Smith (actor) as Pop Durham.
126	18	"How to Succeed in Hazzard"	Harvey Laidman	Michael Michaelian & Michael Sevareid	February 17, 1984	185117
Boss Hogg's nephew Dewey Hogg (Robert Morse), who is Hughie Hogg's older brother, returns to Hazzard for the first time in seven years, and Dewey says that he is dying from a rare and lethal sleeping disorder. Dewey convinces Boss that he wants to build the Dewey Hogg Memorial Clinic as his legacy, if Boss will put up $50,000 and get the town to put up another $50,000. It works, and Dewey and Boss get Jesse to guard the money, which then comes up missing, and Dewey frames Jesse for the scam. Luke and Daisy find that Dewey is faking his illness, and the Dukes devise a plan to get him to lead them right to the money. Luke's plan is to make Dewey believe he had drunk some poison wine and that he really is going to die. Luke pretends to order a very expensive stomach pump which will save his life. As planned, Dewey, in distress at the thought of dying, rushes over to the bank to find the stolen money to pay for the stomach pump. It is then revealed that Dewey had simply transferred the money into a different safety deposit box. However, Luke's plan goes sour when Boss and Rosco blow their scheme. Dewey is able to escape, and the Dukes must follow him in a long car chase. Dewey and his lovely nurse assistant are stopped, and made to march out of Hazzard in disgrace, without the money. Guest starring: Robert Morse as Dewey Hogg; Daina House (credited as "Dana" House) as Nurse; Mickey Morton as Driver; Dean Dittman as Mack Magee. Bo does not appear in this episode, because John Schneider was at a NASCAR rally. He is also absent in "The Fortune Tellers", although, he can be seen in these two episodes at the end, making a phone call, since that part was filmed before he left for the rally.
127	19	"Close Call for Daisy"	Harvey Laidman	Martin Roth	February 24, 1984	185119
Daisy will be playing a nurse in a play at the church. She carries her notes with her in a black book. Nervous Norman Willis (Mike Genovese), a neurotic crime boss, comes to Hazzard County to collect a debt from Boss Hogg. While Norman's limo is in front of the General Lee on the road, the General Lee backfires, and Norman, living up to his nickname, mistakes it for a gunshot. A scared Norman, who thinks he is having a heart attack, has his driver, Jake (Kaz Garas), rush him into town. In town, Norman and Jake see Daisy wearing a nurse uniform, and they do not realize that Daisy is wearing the uniform because she was practicing for the play. Jake gets Daisy's attention, and Daisy comes to help Norman. Norman puts his little black book next to him on the back seat. Daisy puts down her black book, which is identical to Norman's. Jake and Norman decide to go to the local hospital, but first, Daisy grabs her rehearsal notes—or so she thinks. She has actually grabbed Norman's black book, which contains information on all of his crooked operations. When Norman discovers that he has the wrong black book, he is terrified that Daisy has the information that could put him in prison. He and Jake go out hunting for Daisy, with the intent to get the book and kill her, so that she will not reveal any information about their activities. Bo, Luke, and Jesse decide to hide Daisy in Enos's house while they look for Norman and Jake. Norman tells Boss Hogg that his debt will be cleared if he helps Norman find Daisy. Enos unwittingly lets slip Daisy's location to Rosco, and Rosco and Boss tell Willis and Jake where they can find Daisy, with the promise that she will be unharmed. Boss Hogg, who does not condone violence, is not aware that Norman plans to have Jake kill Daisy. Norman and Jake kidnap Daisy from Enos's house, and it is up to the Dukes, Cooter, and Enos to rescue her. Guest starring: Mike Genovese as "Nervous" Norman Willis; Kaz Garas as Jake; Nora Boland as Mrs. Walker; Joe Mays as the Pastor.
128	20	"The Ransom of Hazzard County"	Michael Caffey	Si Rose	March 2, 1984	185120
Recently, the cash flow from Boss Hogg's scams has slowed to a trickle. In Boss's opinion, things would be better if he could get Enos out of the way, and get a deputy who would do two things for him—look the other way, and keep the Dukes out of the way. In order to do that, Boss promotes Enos to the job of Hazzard Commissioner of Records, and then Boss hires Billy Joe Coogan (Michael Alldredge), who is from Cedar City, as the tough new deputy who proves to be an unexpected challenge for the Dukes. What Boss does not know is that Coogan is hatching a crooked plan with a man named Eddie Hollis (Joseph Whipp). Coogan and Hollis have helped Boss Hogg with scams before, but now, there is more than $150,000 that Boss skimmed from the county over the past few years, and he placed it in a hidden account. Coogan learns about it when he sees Boss's secret ledger, and Coogan and Hollis demand that Boss give up the money, or the spillway at the Hazzard dam will be opened up as far as it will go. If the spillway is set wide open for long enough, all of Hazzard will be flooded under about 10 feet of water, and every farm in Hazzard County will be washed out, so the Dukes are in a race against time to stop Coogan and Hollis, and help Enos get his deputy job back. Guest starring: Michael Alldredge as Billy Joe Coogan; Joseph Whipp as Eddie Hollis; Ernie Lively as Clyde the guard.
129	21	"The Fortune Tellers"	Paul Baxley	Si Rose	March 23, 1984	185118
Boss Hogg is in a stew after discovering that Lulu is going to cash in the $100,000 in bonds that Boss Hogg has already cashed in on and replaced with fake bonds. Boss must somehow get rid of the fake bonds. Problem is, Lulu has changed the combination of the safe that she and Boss Hogg keep at home. Boss hires Madame Delilah (Leslie Easterbrook) and Three Pack (Tommy Madden), a pair of fortune-teller con artists, to get the combination of the safe from Lulu and get rid of the fake bonds. But complicating things even further for Boss is the fact that Madame Delilah and Three Pack have robbed the Boar's Nest. Rosco and Boss Hogg, who do not know that Madame Delilah and Three Pack are the robbers, accuse Daisy of the robbery. Luke and Jesse must hide Daisy from Rosco. Daisy and Luke discover the truth about Madame Delilah and Three Pack. Madame Delilah and Three Pack have been robbing Hazzard blind with their scams. Boss Hogg is angry at their victimization of Lulu, and he demands that Madame Delilah and Three Pack be put in jail. Luke and Daisy try to find Madame Delilah and Three Pack, and prove Daisy's innocence. Guest starring: Leslie Easterbrook as Madame Delilah; Tommy Madden as Three Pack. Recurring guest: Peggy Rea as Lulu Coltrane Hogg. Bo does not appear in this episode because actor John Schneider was at a NASCAR rally.
130	22	"Cooter's Confession"	Bob Sweeney	Len Kaufman & Myles Wilder	March 30, 1984	185121
Jonas Jones (Hal Williams) rescued Cooter from a fire in Oklahoma 10 years ago, and they have been friends ever since. An auto parts supply distribution firm, scheduled to deliver a shipment of parts for Boss Hogg, is a front for a hijacking and theft ring led by John Harris (George McDaniel). When Jonas is framed for a hijacking by Harris's crew, Cooter takes the rap for Jonas in order to stop Harris from framing Jonas. That is much to Boss and Rosco's delight, since Cooter unwittingly implicates Bo and Luke as accessories. With Jonas in hiding, Bo and Luke help Cooter escape from jail. While Jesse and Daisy try to infiltrate Harris's distribution firm, Luke goes undercover as a driver for their operation to set a trap for the hijackers, but when Rosco and Boss show up to arrest Bo and Cooter, they are forced to take drastic action. Guest starring: Hal Williams as Jonas Jones; George McDaniel as John Harris; Michael J. Cutt as Bart Barton; Susan Walden as Ruth; Rhonda Shear as Flossie.

=== Season 7 (1984–85) ===
No. overall	No. in season	Title	Directed by	Written by	Original release date	Prod. code
131	1	"Happy Birthday, General Lee"	Tom Wopat	Si Rose	September 21, 1984	129
The Dukes are celebrating the anniversary of the day that they got the General Lee eight years ago in 1976, and we see the story of how they got the General Lee. Eight years ago, Luke was just out of the Marines, and Bo was just out of high school. Two jewel thieves named Ginny (Janie Fricke) and Rick (Sam Melville) hid $50,000 worth of gold dust under the dashboard of the car, a Dodge Charger that was painted black at the time. The car was wrecked and taken to a junkyard. Bo and Luke were searching for a race car so they could compete in a local race, which had a prize of $10,000 going to the winner. Their search lead them to the black Dodge Charger. The Dukes bought the car, and took it to Cooter's garage to soup it up and paint it its current color, orange—the only color Cooter had at his garage at the time. It was Jesse's idea to name it the General Lee. The number 01, as Bo explained, means "From here on out, it's number one all the way." Ginny and Rick went after the Dukes to get the gold dust, but the Dukes managed to stop them, win the race, and keep the General Lee. Guest starring: Sam Melville as Rick; Janie Fricke as Ginny; Wayne Morton as a customer; Troy Melton as Sheriff Snead; Will Hare as the yard manager. Notes: Some of the clothing was original such as Luke's plain blue shirt, Rosco's sheriff's jacket, and Uncle Jesse's black hat.
132	2	"Welcome, Waylon Jennings"	Bob Sweeney	Story by : David R. Toddman, Ken Kaufman and Myles Wilder; Teleplay by : Len Kaufman and Myles Wilder	September 28, 1984	130
After six seasons of complaining in song that they "keep showing my hands and not my face on TV," Waylon Jennings finally appears on The Dukes of Hazzard, on camera. An old friend of the Duke family, Waylon brings his tour bus and traveling museum to Hazzard County. Years ago, before his first professional gig, someone stole Waylon Jennings's guitar. With no money to replace it, he would have missed his opportunity, but then a stranger loaned him the money to replace it. That stranger was Jesse Duke. They have been friends ever since. Waylon enters Hazzard, traveling in a very valuable mobile country music history museum to use as a charity exhibit. This museum, considering its value, is a very desirable item, for a thief. And Boss Hogg is always willing do almost anything for money. Boss hires two crooks named Buddy (Stephen Lee) and Jeb (Terrence Evans) to steal the museum and hold it for ransom. Guest starring: Waylon Jennings as himself; Shannon Tweed as Betty Jo Page; Stephen Lee as Buddy; Terrence Evans as Jeb.
133	3	"Dr. Jekyll and Mr. Duke"	Michael Caffey	Len Kaufman & Myles Wilder	October 5, 1984	131
Bo, Luke, and Daisy are on their way to an old-fashioned hay ride. Meanwhile, a truck carrying an experimental genetic drug accidentally drops a vial of it into the Hazzard pond. Shortly after, the Dukes must stop at the pond to get water for the General Lee's radiator, since it has overheated. While filling a jug of water from the lake, Luke also takes a small drink. He does not realize that he is drinking water that has been contaminated by the genetic drug. Luke begins to experience a severe personality change. He becomes obnoxious, and he begins to turn on Bo. When they get to the hay ride, Luke insults Enos and says that he now sees that Hazzard is just a joke of a town. When all the Dukes are back at the farm, Luke continues to insult his family. He forgoes the ceremony of saying grace and he insults Uncle Jesse's cooking. For Bo, this is the last straw, and he wants to have it out with Luke. Jesse asks Bo to hold back. Luke takes off in the General. Out of respect for Jesse's wishes, Bo agrees to go look for the dramatically changed Luke. Luke, who is now under the full influence of the drug, goes on a rampage, even running Bo off the road. Luke is observed by Hurley (Alan Autry) and Ben (Greg Finley), two men who are planning to rob the Hazzard Bank, and they are looking for a good getaway driver. Luke, in his current frame of mind, agrees to help them, for a cut of the money. Soon, Boss Hogg becomes aware of Hurley and Ben's plans to rob his bank, and begins to devise his own plan to catch Hurley, Ben, and especially Luke in the act. Meanwhile, the remaining Dukes have discovered the empty genetic drug vial at the lake, and have gone to the research company in Atlanta to find out more information, in hopes of saving Luke from its effects. Dr. Debbie Davis (Lori Hallier) tells them that the drug will not wear off until 11:00 AM the following morning. The Dukes hurry back to Hazzard to try to prevent Luke from getting himself into trouble. However, they arrive too late. Luke has already done the robbery with Hurley and Ben, and he has been videotaped by Boss' surveillance cameras. It is up to Uncle Jesse and Daisy to catch up to Rosco and get the tape from him before he delivers it to the authorities. Rosco is unwilling to listen to their story, but Rosco's dog Flash chews the tape up. Bo and Enos find Hurley and Ben. Bo has it out with Luke. During the fight, the drug wears off, and Luke is his old self again. Luke apologizes to everyone that he had insulted while he was under the influence of the drug, and everyone is forgiving. Guest starring: Alan Autry as Hurley; Lori Hallier as Dr. Debbie Davis; Greg Finley as Ben; Ben Slack as Mr. Adams; James Bradford as Zeb. Recurring guest: Parley Baer as Doc Appleby.
134	4	"Robot P. Coltrane"	Bob Sweeney	Len Kaufman & Myles Wilder	October 12, 1984	132
A computer technician named Rance (Ray Colbert) is fired from his job shortly after completing work on a contract. He and a co-worker named Marv (William Allen Young) get revenge against their former employer by stealing a cache of electronics to sell on the black market, then steal back for ransom. One of those items is an advanced robot named Bobby Joe (Robert Shields). Bo and Luke, who had an earlier skirmish with Rance and Marv, become suspicious, and investigate their van. Rosco catches the Duke boys inside the van, but bungles the arrest. The robot, however, is easily able to apprehend the Dukes. Boss Hogg is impressed, buys the robot, and promptly promotes Bobby Joe to Hazzard County Sheriff. Boss Hogg is unaware that Marv and Rance have plans to use Bobby Joe to rob the Hazzard Bank. The Dukes are suspicious and begin to investigate. Before long, they find the crooks' hideout and their ransom note to the electronics company, proving that Bobby Joe was stolen. Things get difficult for the Dukes when Marv and Rance discover that the Dukes have been snooping around. Marv and Rance capture the Dukes and tie them up before heading out to rob the bank. After they have put all the loot in their truck, they have Bobby Joe hold Rosco at the scene so it will appear that Rosco robbed the bank. When Boss Hogg arrives, he is angry at Rosco, until the Dukes show up and explain everything about Marv and Rance. The Dukes take off in the General, followed by Rosco and Enos, to find Marv and Rance. Bo and Luke are able to stop Marv and Rance's truck and grab them. Rosco and Enos show up just in time to collect Marv and Rance, and the stolen money. Rosco is now a proud sheriff once again. Guest starring: Robert Shields as Bobby Joe the Robot; William Allen Young as Marv; Ray Colbert as Rance.
135	5	"No More Mr. Nice Guy"	Ralph Riskin	Martin Roth	October 19, 1984	133
A senator is heading to Hazzard to check up on its law enforcement, and in order to cover up a robbery that Boss Hogg masterminded, Boss Hogg swindles the Dukes into thinking that Daisy won a bunch of prizes, including a fur coat and a diamond necklace, at the Capitol City Department Store by being the 1,000,000th customer. The "prizes" turn out to be stolen, courtesy of Boss Hogg's robbery, framing the Dukes. Just as Boss Hogg is relishing the opportunity to send the Dukes to prison, he takes a blow to the head and wakes up with amnesia. Boss Hogg suddenly becomes a nice guy, and double-crosses his partners Stoney (John Matuszak) and Zack (Jan Eddy), who want to silence him. Guest starring: Audrey Landers as Billie Jean; John Matuszak as Stoney; Jan Eddy as Zack. Recurring guest: Parley Baer as Doc Appleby.
136	6	"The Dukes in Hollywood"	George Bowers	Si Rose	November 2, 1984	134
While a Hollywood production company is shooting a movie in Hazzard, the movie's star, Brock Curtis (Barry Van Dyke), loses the use of the brakes in his car, and the Dukes save him. When the producers witness that, they offer the Dukes a part in the movie. The Dukes, with Boss and Rosco in tow, go to Hollywood. In Hollywood, Boss and Rosco try to find a way to be in a movie, but it is Flash who catches the eye of a talent agent. The Dukes discover that Brock's near accident was no accident—producer Jason Dillard (Brett Halsey), who has severe financial problems, has taken out a $5,000,000 life insurance policy on Brock, and now Jason is having a man named Blake (Frank Annese) try to kill Brock so Jason can collect the money. It is up to the Dukes to find a way to stop Dillard and Blake. Guest starring: Barry Van Dyke as Brock Curtis; Joel Brooks as the Director; Brett Halsey as Jason Dillard; Frank Annese as Blake; Jason Bernard as the Chief Guard; Floyd Levine as G.S. Baldwin; Karen Witter as Jackie; John W. Smith as Guard #1.
137	7	"Cool Hands, Luke & Bo"	Ralph Riskin	Michael Michaelian & Michael Sevareid	November 9, 1984	135
Boss Hogg's arch-enemy, Colonel Cassius B. Claybourne (Morgan Woodward), the commissioner of Osage County, hatches his master plan to take over Hazzard County from Boss. First, Claybourne nails Bo and Luke while they are passing through Osage County, and puts them on the Osage County chain gang, where they are harassed by the guards, who are led by Captain Slater (Brion James). Just as Claybourne planned, the Hazzard townspeople pressure Boss into trying to free Bo and Luke. With public pressure mounting, Boss and Rosco give in to Claybourne's demand to hand over Boss's moonshine contracts in exchange for Bo and Luke's freedom. When Boss and Rosco go to Osage County to get Bo and Luke, Claybourne has Boss and Rosco arrested and placed on the road gang along with Bo and Luke. Claybourne manages to exploit Boss's voracious appetite for high-calorie dishes in an effort to extort Boss out of everything he owns—which is basically most of Hazzard County. Now, Bo and Luke on the inside, along with Daisy, Jesse, and General Lee on the outside, have to find a way to break everyone out, and take Hazzard back from Claybourne and his sheriff, R. P. "Droopy" Cathcarte (Claude Earl Jones). Guest starring: Brion James as Captain Slater; Claude Earl Jones as Sheriff R. P. "Droopy" Cathcarte; James Avery as Charlie; Morgan Woodward as Col. Cassius B. Claiborne; Tom Willett as Deputy. (uncredited) Recurring guest: Peggy Rea as Lulu Coltrane Hogg.
138	8	"Go West, Young Dukes"	Don McDougall	Martin Roth	November 16, 1984	136
After inheriting his grandfather's estate, Boss Hogg finds a letter from Jesse's great-great-grandfather Jeremiah Duke, saying that Jeremiah signed the Duke farm over to Boss Hogg's great-great-grandfather Thaddeus B. Hogg in 1872, a time when Hazzard was a cattle town called Sleepy City. Now, Boss evicts the Dukes from the farm, but before they go, they look in Jeremiah's old diary to find out what really happened back then, because the diary might give them a clue as to how to keep the farm out of Boss Hogg's hands. What they find is that Thaddeus Hogg was pressuring Jeremiah Duke to sell the farm. Bo, Luke, and Daisy's great-grandparents, Joe Duke, Hank Duke, and Dixie Duke, came to help Jeremiah, and found themselves up against Hogg's hired help: Frank James (Nick Benedict) and Jesse James (Paul Koslo). When they could not scare off the Dukes, Hogg framed Hank for horse rustling, and traded Hank's freedom to Jeremiah for the farm. Thinking that he won, Hogg headed for town just as the James boys robbed his safe. They grabbed him and Rufus Z. Coltrane, Rosco's great-great-grandfather, and headed for the hills. Did the Dukes of old save the day back then, and will it help the present-day Dukes keep the farm out of Boss Hogg's hands? Guest starring: Paul Koslo as Jesse James; Nick Benedict as Frank James; Doris Dowling as Jenny Duke.
139	9	"Cale Yarborough Comes to Hazzard"	James Best	Len Kaufman & Myles Wilder	November 23, 1984	137
Cale Yarborough comes to Hazzard to visit Robbie (Chad Sheets), an orphan who is about to undergo surgery at Tri-County Hospital. Eddie Scoggins (Al White) and Elmo Smith (Dennis Haskins), two men who robbed the Capitol City Bank and then bought a hideout from Boss Hogg, frame Bo, Luke, and Cale for the robbery. Guest starring: Cale Yarborough as himself; Al White as Eddie Scoggins; Dennis Haskins as Elmo Smith; Chad Sheets as Robby. Recurring guest: Parley Baer as Doc Appleby. Dennis Haskins went on to star as Principal Richard Belding on Saved by the Bell.
140	10	"Danger on the Hazzard Express"	Sorrell Booke	Si Rose	November 30, 1984	138
A train will be coming through Hazzard County, and it includes a box car that contains more than $3,000,000 worth of valuables. Boss Hogg has hired three men named Burke (Wayne Grace), Carney (Steve James), and Perry (Ted Markland), and Boss masterminds a plan to knock the boxcar off the train so Burke, Carney, and Perry can steal the valuables for him. Burke, Carney, and Perry are to set up a car to be remote controlled so they can use it to knock the box car off the train. When the car that they plan to use gets wrecked, Burke, Carney, and Perry steal the General Lee to use instead. Using the General Lee would automatically implicate Bo and Luke, and when Bo and Luke start searching for the General Lee, they are grabbed by Burke, Carney, and Perry, who tie them up, gag them, and plan to kill them, which is something that Boss would never approve of, since he does not condone violence. It is up to Jesse and Daisy to find Bo and Luke, and help them. Boss Hogg is appalled that the men are planning to kill Bo and Luke, so he, Rosco, and Enos help as well. Guest starring: Wayne Grace as Burke; Steve James as Carney; Ted Markland as Mr. Perry.
141	11	"Sittin' Dukes"	George Bowers	Martin Roth	December 14, 1984	139
Escaped convict and former Marine Lee Benson (Judson Scott) and his accomplice Brad Hixx (Robert Gray) go to Hazzard, because Lee is out to settle a score with Luke. While Luke and Lee were in the Marines, and Luke was a sergeant, Benson was robbing his best friend's foot locker, and he walked in on Benson doing it. Luke came in and found that Benson had stabbed the man, but not killed him, so Luke had Benson locked in the brig for a couple of years. Now, Benson wants Luke to pay for that. As part of Benson's plan to get even, he orders Bo and Luke to drive them out of state in the General Lee at gunpoint, and not to let on that anything is not right when they are approached by the authorities. Chickasaw County Sheriff Big Ed Little, who is helping track Benson and Hixx, assumes that the Dukes are helping Benson and Hixx. To escape detection, Benson and Hixx force Bo and Luke to drive through a forest fire. When Sheriff Little locks everyone except Enos in a holding cell to prevent their interference, Bo and Luke must rely on Enos' help, and their own wits, to stop Benson and Hixx. Guest starring: Judson Scott as Lee Benson; Robert Gray as Brad Hixx. Recurring guests: Peggy Rea as Lulu Coltrane Hogg; Don Pedro Colley as Sheriff Ed Little. Notes: Actors Judson Scott (Who played the role of Lee Benson) and Robert Gray (Who played the role of Brad Hixx) later appeared together as Armored Car thieves in The A-Team episode "Incident at Crystal Lake".
142	12	"Sky Bandits Over Hazzard"	Ralph Riskin	Si Rose	December 21, 1984	140
When Kate (Karen Lamn), Taylor (Bob Hastings), Budge (Chip Heller), and Cleary (Michael Prokopuk), a group of armored car robbers, steal an armored car by lifting it off the ground with a helicopter—the armored car carrying Boss' uninsured bank money—the Dukes are blamed for the theft. When Bo and Luke are apprehended, Kate, Taylor, Budge, and Cleary strike again. Now knowing that the Dukes are innocent, Boss and Rosco allow Bo and Luke to escape so they can do Rosco's work and nail the hijackers. And then the hijackers kidnap Daisy. Bo, Luke, Jesse, Enos, Boss, and Rosco team up to rescue Daisy. Bo and Luke take to the air to locate the gang's hideout. Guest starring: Karen Lamm as Kate; Bob Hastings as Taylor; Chip Heller as Budge; Michael Prokopuk as Cleary; Brenda Bowie as the aerobics instructor; Robert Resnick as the Driver. Recurring guest: Nedra Volz as Emma Tisdale.
143	13	"The Haunting of J.D. Hogg"	Tom Wopat	Len Kaufman & Myles Wilder	January 4, 1985	141
Boss Hogg's great uncle Silas Hogg has recently passed away and left in his will $100,000 to give to charity at the discretion of the executor of the estate. The executor of the estate is Jesse. Boss, who wants the money, tries every dirty trick he can think of in his efforts to make himself the executor of Silas Hogg's estate. At Silas' farm, the Dukes, with the help of a ventriloquist and special effects wizard named Mr. Winkle (Bill McLean), set up some gadgets and make it look like Silas is haunting Boss so that he will give up his plan to take over as executor of the estate, while Boss's attorney, Larson (Jason Evers), tries to get his hands on the money. Guest starring: Jason Evers as Attorney Larson; Chris Mulkey as Sharp; Bill McLean as Mr. Winkle.
144	14	"When You Wish Upon a Hogg"	Michael Caffey	Martin Roth	January 11, 1985	142
Hughie Hogg (Jeff Altman) returns to Hazzard County, with a plan to cheat Boss Hogg out of everything he owns: with the help of a woman named Trixie (Katherine "Kitty" Moffat), Hughie makes Boss think that there is a genie in a magic lamp that will give him untold wealth, eternal power, and a way to get Bo and Luke out of his way once and for all. It will take some sleight of hand by the Dukes to stop Hughie before Bo and Luke end up in prison, and all Boss and Rosco are left with is a worthless lamp. Guest starring: Katherine Moffat as Trixie; Pat Studstill as Barclay; Roger Torrey as Norris. Recurring guest: Jeff Altman as Hughie Hogg. Notes: This episode was Roger Torrey's final on-screen role.
145	15	"Strange Visitor to Hazzard"	Sorrell Booke	Si Rose	January 25, 1985	143
There have been some UFO sightings in Hazzard County lately, and Bo and Luke are starting to think that people are crazy, until what seems to be an alien (Felix Silla) hides in the General Lee and comes back to the Duke farm with them. When Boss hears of it, he wants to take the visitor and use him as a tourist attraction. At the same time, a pair of thieves named Mickey Larsen (Dennis Burkley) and Buck Simmons (Britt Leach) are casing Hazzard in preparation for a planned robbery of the Hazzard Bank. Guest starring: Dennis Burkley as Mickey Larsen; Britt Leach as Buck Simmons; Ritchie Montgomery as Elton Loggins; Felix Silla as "Little Cousin"; Robert Aaron as Clyde Berney.
146	16	"Enos and Daisy's Wedding"	Tom Wopat	Story by : Len Kaufman and Myles Wilder; Teleplay by : Martin Roth and Myles Wilder	February 1, 1985	144
A pair of crooks named Slade (Anthony De Longis) and Jerry (Scott Lincoln) force an unwilling Enos to hand over the bank transfer shipment at the Hazzard Bank. Daisy sees Enos with the money, but Daisy does not see Slade and Jerry, who threaten to shoot Daisy unless Enos does what they say. Slade and Jerry get away. With Daisy only seeing Enos getting the money, the state's Deputy Attorney General (Michael Fairman) jails Enos for the robbery. Daisy cannot refuse to testify against Enos, or she will be held in contempt. Daisy, knowing that Enos would never rob a bank, proposes marriage to him, because a wife cannot legally be forced to testify against her husband. Slade and Jerry try to stop the marriage from happening, because the marriage would mess up their frame job. In order to clear Enos' name, Bo and Luke try to find Slade and Jerry. Guest starring: Anthony De Longis as Slade; Scott Lincoln as Jerry; Michael Fairman as Deputy Attorney General; Royce Applegate as Insurance Adjuster. Recurring guest: Peggy Rea as Lulu Hogg.
147	17	"Opening Night at the Boar's Nest"	John Schneider	Si Rose & John Schneider	February 8, 1985	145
Lulu Hogg stages her annual charity talent contest at the Boar's Nest. One of the performers is Rosco, who plans a magic act, and he names Boss Hogg as his assistant. Boss is annoyed that he must participate in the act, because it conflicts with a scheduled appointment to close a big-time deal. Knowing that Lulu would walk out on him if he refuses, Boss decides to participate. Boss schemes to use the "disappearance" as an opportunity to drive into town for his appointment. However, the "disappearance" works out too well. Paroled convict Floyd Malone (Kevin Peter Hall) and his equally muscular brother Bubba (Ji-Tu Cumbuka) are out to make Boss pay for testifying against Floyd in a hijacking case three years ago. They make their move, and kidnap Boss outside the Boar's Nest—unknown to Rosco, the Dukes or the others inside. After convincing Lulu that Boss's disappearance might have been foul play, Bo and Luke search for the Malones, who have demanded $1,000,000—or Boss will be killed. The Dukes have a difficult time convincing grief-stricken Rosco that his magic was not responsible for Boss's disappearance. Bo and Luke hatch a plan to rescue Boss from the Malones. Once Boss is rescued and the Malones are arrested, Bo and Luke convince Boss to reprise the second half of Rosco's magic trick. Boss still does not want to do so, until he sees an emotional Rosco recalling all the good times they had together, and how Boss was the only one to stand by him. Boss "reappears" on cue when Bo and Luke convince Rosco to try the trick, one last time. An overjoyed Rosco is happy to see Boss again. Guest starring: Kevin Peter Hall as Floyd Malone; Ji-Tu Cumbuka as Bubba Malone. Recurring guest: Peggy Rea as Lulu Coltrane Hogg.
