= The Dukes (TV series) =

1983 Saturday morning animated series

- Genre: Action; Comedy
- Based on: The Dukes of Hazzard by: Gy Waldron; Jerry Rushing
- Developed by: Ray Parker
- Directed by: Oscar Dufau; George Gordon (season 2); Carl Urbano (season 2); John Walker (season 2); Rudy Zamora (season 2)
- Voices of: Byron Cherry; Christopher Mayer; Tom Wopat; John Schneider; Catherine Bach; Denver Pyle; James Best; Sorrell Booke; Frank Welker
- Theme music composer: Hoyt Curtin
- Opening theme: "The Dukes"
- Ending theme: "The Dukes" (Instrumental)
- Composer: Hoyt Curtin
- Country of origin: United States
- Original language: English
- No. of seasons: 2
- No. of episodes: 20

Production
- Executive producers: William Hanna; Joseph Barbera
- Producer: Kay Wright
- Editors: Gil Iverson; Robert Ciaglia (season 2)
- Production companies: Hanna-Barbera Productions; Warner Bros. Television

Original release
- Network: CBS
- Release: February 5 – October 29, 1983

Related
- The Dukes of Hazzard

The Dukes is a 30-minute Saturday morning animated series and a spin-off of The Dukes of Hazzard. The series is based on the live-action television series of the same name. It originally aired on CBS from February 5 to October 29, 1983. Hanna-Barbera Productions produced the series in association with Warner Bros. Television, producer of the original series. 20 episodes were produced.

== Plot ==
The series features the Duke boys and their cousin Daisy in an automobile race around the world against Boss Hogg, Sheriff Rosco P. Coltrane, and Rosco's pet basset hound Flash in a duel for the prize money which the Dukes hope to use to keep the family farm from being foreclosed by Boss Hogg. Actually, Boss Hogg wants the money and the land for himself so he, Rosco, and Flash plans various schemes to keep the Dukes from winning with comical results. Most of the adventures are read from a post card by Uncle Jesse Duke to his pet raccoon Smokey.

The first season took place during the period of the live-action series' temporary replacement of the original actors with similar characters, Coy and Vance Duke, after Tom Wopat and John Schneider walked out over a dispute about royalties from related merchandise. Thus, the first season of this animated series featured Coy and Vance. Bo and Luke eventually replaced Coy and Vance in Season 2 Episode 1 (14): "Boss O'Hogg and the Little People" after Tom and John simultaneously returned to the live series following the end of the dispute near the end of the fifth season. This episode also featured a new introduction and voice over that reflected the change in characters.

The series followed no particular logical geographic path; for instance, consecutive episodes feature appearances in Venice, Morocco, the Arctic Ocean, London, Greece, India, Uzbekistan, Hong Kong and Scotland.

== Episodes ==
=== Season 1 (1983) ===
No.	Title	Original release date
1	"Put Up Your Dukes!"	February 5, 1983
Coy, Vance and Daisy Duke are in The General Lee, and race Boss Hogg and Rosco, and Roscoe's basset hound Flash around the world. They go to Australia to see their cousin who owns a boxing kangaroo.
2	"Jungle Jitters"	February 12, 1983
The Dukes and Boss race through South America, where Boss steals their spare gas. But Coy, Vance and Daisy meet some volcano-worshiping natives who try to sacrifice the General Lee.
3	"The Dukes in Venice"	February 19, 1983
Bank robbers steal General Lee as a getaway car in front of the Colosseum in Rome. Coy, Vance and Daisy do get him back, but Boss and Rosco tell the local police the Dukes committed the crime.
4	"Morocco Bound"	February 26, 1983
During a luggage mix-up at a hotel in Morocco, Rosco gets a hold of Aladdin's lamp, which had been stolen originally by the person that had it. Boss and Rosco hide it in the hotel shop, where Daisy buys it as a souvenir. The original thief schemes to get it back from Boss and the Dukes.
5	"The Secret Satellite"	March 5, 1983
Coy, Vance, Daisy, Boss Hogg and Rosco go after a U.S. satellite that crashed into the Arctic Circle. The Dukes do it for their country and Boss does it for the $10,000 reward.
6	"The Dukes of London"	March 12, 1983
In London, Flash is accidentally switched with Her Majesty's basset hound Regina. The Dukes wind up with Regina, and get arrested for kidnapping. Note: This episode inspired the episode of the regular series The Dukes of Hazzard, "A Boy's Best Friend", where Flash is switched with a famous show dog.
7	"The Greece Fleece"	March 19, 1983
In Greece, Boss Hogg uses a man named Big Nick to frame Coy, Vance and Daisy and get them sent to jail. Then, he learns that the person who marries Nick's daughter gets a great deal of money. Boss plans to secretly marry her, then run off with the money.
8	"The Dukes in India"	March 26, 1983
Boss Hogg has the Grand vizier (based on the Mughal Empire of India, which was ruled by such) set up traps to slow down Coy, Vance and Daisy, so that he will win the race.
9	"The Dukes in Uzbekistan"	April 2, 1983
Coy, Vance and Daisy help an English archeologist find her father, who was looking for an Uzbek diamond mine.
10	"A Hogg in Hong Kong"	April 9, 1983
While preparing for a race in Hong Kong, Coy, Vance, Daisy, Boss Hogg and Rosco get captured by pirates. It's up to the Dukes to make sure they don't all become sushi.
11	"The Dukes in Scotland"	April 16, 1983
Coy, Vance, Daisy, Boss and Rosco meet Billy Bob and June Stewart from Hazzard County in Scotland. They have just inherited a castle that's haunted. The Dukes' questioning the supernatural has merit when they see counterfeiting machines and paper about. This episode is based on the episode of the regular series The Dukes of Hazzard, "The Hazzardville Horror", in which a haunted house was a front for silver thieves.
12	"The Dukes Do Paris"	April 23, 1983
Boss Hogg plans to buy a stamp called the Blue Wazoo in Paris. The man gives it to Daisy, who he thinks is working for Boss. Now, the law from Hazzard and the French law is after the Dukes, or as the French say it, the "Dukies".
13	"The Dukes Do Switzerland"	April 30, 1983
Coy, Vance and Daisy meet a father and daughter on the run from the Slavonia Secret Police (then part of Yugoslavia, now modern-day Croatia; asylum seekers defected from Yugoslavia to Switzerland; see Immigration from the former Yugoslavia to Switzerland for real life references.) The two developed a formula that turns seawater into gasoline. Boss Hogg and Rosco steal the formula, and the Dukes plan on getting it back.

=== Season 2 (1983) ===
Starting in the very first episode of this season, Tom Wopat and John Schneider return as Luke and Bo in the regular Dukes of Hazzard series, and take over for Coy and Vance in the cartoon.

No.	Title	Written by	Original release date
14	"Boss O'Hogg and the Little People"	Ray Parker	September 17, 1983
In Ireland, Boss Hogg and Rosco find a bunch of leprechauns and steal all of their gold. Bo, Luke and Daisy try to save them from being thrown over the rainbow.
15	"The Tales of Vienna Hoods"	O. Gordy	September 24, 1983
While racing Bo, Luke and Daisy through Austria, Boss Hogg and Rosco are baby-sitting Boss' niece, Cindy Sue. Thieves kidnap the Dukes and Cindy Sue, and will only let them go if Boss pays a ransom of $1,000,000!
16	"The Kid from Madrid"	O. Gordy	October 1, 1983
A crook runs the General Lee off the road in Madrid. Then Bo, Luke and Daisy meet a new, helping friend, Pepino and his race-horse, El Blanco.
17	"A Dickens of a Christmas"	David R. Toddman	October 8, 1983
Bo, Luke, Daisy, Boss and Rosco take a break to celebrate the holiday at Christmas, influenced by Charles Dickens' A Christmas Carol.
18	"The Canadian Caper"	David R. Toddman	October 15, 1983
While in Canada, Boss Hogg meets some poachers and buys illegal fur from them.
19	"The Dukes in Hollywood"	O. Gordy	October 22, 1983
The Dukes are hired as stunt drivers in a Hollywood movie by a crooked producer, who also tricks Boss into a scam.
20	"A Hogg in the Foggy Bog"	O. Gordy	October 29, 1983
Back in Hazzard County, Uncle Jesse finds an ancestor's treasure map and meets up with Bo, Luke and Daisy in the Philippines, where the Dukes and Boss Hogg race to find the treasure.

== Cast ==
- Byron Cherry as Coy Duke (first season)
- Christopher Mayer as Vance Duke (first season)
- Tom Wopat as Luke Duke (second season)
- John Schneider as Bo Duke (second season)
- Catherine Bach as Daisy Duke
- Denver Pyle as Uncle Jesse Duke
- James Best as Sheriff Rosco P. Coltrane
- Sorrell Booke as Boss Hogg
- Frank Welker as Flash, Smokey, The General Lee

Note: Live-action co-stars/supporting characters Waylon Jennings (narrator/"balladeer"), Ben Jones (Cooter Davenport), Sonny Shroyer (Deputy Enos Strate), and Rick Hurst (Deputy Cletus Hogg) did not appear in this cartoon version.

=== Additional voices ===
- Jack Angel
- Chris Anthony (Season 1)
- Jered Barclay (Season 1)
- Michael Bell (Season 1)
- Susan Blu (Season 2)
- Bill Callaway (Season 1)
- Rick Cimino (Season 2)
- Phil Clarke
- Peter Cullen (Season 1)
- Keene Curtis
- Jennifer Darling (Season 1)
- Dick Erdman
- Pat Fraley (Season 2)
- Linda Gary (Season 1)
- Joan Gerber (Season 1)
- Gary Goren (Season 2)
- Joy Gronic (Season 2)
- Ernest Harada (Season 1)
- Phil Hartman (Season 2)
- Bob Holt
- Arte Johnson (Season 2)
- Stanley Jones
- Paul Kirby
- Peter Leeds (Season 1)
- Sherry Lynn (Season 2)
- Ken Mars (Season 1)
- Edie McClurg (Season 1)
- Scott Menville (Season 1)
- Larry Moss (Season 1)
- Laurel Page (Season 1)
- Pat Pinney (Season 2)
- Henry Polic II (Season 1)
- Tony Pope (Season 1)
- Phil Proctor (Season 1)
- Bob Ridgely (Season 1)
- Neil Ross (Season 1)
- Mike Rye (Season 1)
- Marilyn Schreffler (Season 1)
- Hal Smith (Season 1)
- John Stephenson
- Janet Waldo (Season 2)
- Alan Young (Season 2)

== Home media ==
On December 7, 2010, Warner Archive released The Dukes: The Complete Series on DVD in region 1 as part of their Hanna-Barbera Classic Collection.

== See also ==
- List of animated spin-offs from prime time shows
