= The Dukes of Hazzard: Hazzard in Hollywood =

2000 American television film

- Genre: Action; Adventure; Comedy
- Written by: Gy Waldron; Bob Clark
- Directed by: Bradford May
- Starring: John Schneider; Tom Wopat; Catherine Bach; James Best; Sonny Shroyer; Rick Hurst; Ben Jones
- Narrated by: Mac Davis
- Music by: David Hoffner; Tom Rizzo
- Country of origin: United States
- Original language: English

Production
- Executive producers: Bob Clark; Gy Waldron
- Producers: Elliot Friedgen; Skip Ward
- Cinematography: Bradford May
- Editor: Drake Silliman
- Running time: 88 minutes
- Production companies: Kudzu Productions; Warner Bros. Television

Original release
- Network: CBS
- Release: May 19, 2000

The Dukes of Hazzard: Hazzard in Hollywood is a 2000 American made-for-television action-adventure comedy film based on the 1979–1985 television series The Dukes of Hazzard which aired on CBS on May 19, 2000. It is the second Dukes of Hazzard film.

As with The Dukes of Hazzard: Reunion! movie, the "Good Ol' Boys" theme is abandoned, this time for a song called "Good Times".

== Synopsis ==
Hazzard in Hollywood follows up on the first reunion movie, The Dukes of Hazzard: Reunion! and begins with Bo and Luke Duke partaking in the Hazzard County festival which features actual country music star Toby Keith as himself.

When an old enemy of the deceased J.D. Hogg, Ezra Bushmaster, arrives in Hazzard, he donates a significant amount of money to the hospital fund, on the condition that the people of Hazzard can raise the rest by a certain amount of time. A music promoter on vacation in Hazzard says he'll buy the master tapes of the performances of music stars who performed in Hazzard. So the Dukes decide to travel to Hollywood to sell some country music recordings to raise the rest of the money.

They are joined by Rosco P. Coltrane in his RV accompanied by a fake Basset Hound named Albert Einstein, Cooter Davenport, and Cletus Hogg in a truck carrying Daisy's motorcycle. On the way there they were shot at by a one-eyed hitman, who was hired by Ezra, as it was later discovered, to stop the Dukes.

Once they get to Hollywood, they set up a camp in Hollywood Hills, Enos Strate joins them but informs them they need permits to camp next to the Hollywood sign. Later, a couple of hitmen steal the RV. In an attempt to recover the RV and the music that was inside it, Bo and Luke save a Mexican from a group of gang members. The boy's older brother soon arrives with friends in a lowrider convertible. They thank Bo and Luke and, after seeing what they can do with The General Lee and a ramp, invite them to a block party where Bo falls in love with a cousin of Cipriano (the older brother).

The next morning, they get information that the RV is at a chop shop. By the time they get there, the RV has been chopped for parts. But the music recordings were not inside, so they continue looking when The General Lee's transmission goes out. They are confronted by a woman who threatens to take their car which she thinks has a racing engine she wants, which they do not have.

After being confronted by rattlesnakes on The General Lee's seat, she asks them, "You boys aren't from New Jersey, are you?" It is revealed that the two hitmen who stole the RV went to her, and she threatened them the same way, and they told her that the boys had the racing engine she was looking for. She fixes The General Lee in exchange for the recipe to Uncle Jesse's old barbecue sauce.

In the meantime, Daisy gets work as a stuntwoman and Rosco meets up with an unfriendly loan shark and the music promoter was a big ol' fraud that had tangled with Enos in the past as has the loan shark. The boys eventually retrieve the music, and discover that Ezra Bushmaster, the man who donated the money for the hospital was the same man behind the theft all along.

== Cast ==
- John Schneider as Bo Duke
- Tom Wopat as Luke Duke
- Catherine Bach as Daisy Duke
- Sonny Shroyer as Enos Strate
- James Best as Sheriff Rosco P. Coltrane, the Sheriff/Commissioner of Hazzard County
- Ben Jones as Cooter Davenport,
- Rick Hurst as Cletus Hogg
- Aleksandr Kuznetsov as Igor the Terrible
- Kristof Konrad as Misha
- Sven Holmberg as Sergei
- Mac Davis steps in as the Balladeer, and appears on camera to present exposition to the audience for the 2nd time. Waylon Jennings was the first one to appear on screen in the episode Welcome Waylon Jennings of Season 7.
- The movie introduces a former love interest of Luke's called Anita Blackwell, who sometimes is referred to as Anita Blackwood. She is played by Anita Cochran.
- The movie also introduces the new love interest of Bo Duke, Gabriela. She is played by Patricia Manterola.
- Ezra Bushmaster is played by Nicolas Coster.
- The film is dedicated to Denver Pyle, who played Uncle Jesse.
- This movie is the last time the original cast appears in any Dukes production. On The Dukes of Hazzard fourth season DVD set, Tom Wopat said that he is opposed to any further reunion movies with the original cast because the absence of Sorrell Booke and Denver Pyle shows very vividly onscreen and to him, the chemistry is not right anymore.

== Home media ==
The movie was released in Region 1 on June 10, 2008, along with the first reunion movie (The Dukes of Hazzard: Reunion!). The movie was also released in Region 4 on June 4, 2014, along with the first reunion movie.
