= Boar's Nest =

Fictional restaurant

The Boar's Nest is a fictional local restaurant and tavern appearing in the television series The Dukes of Hazzard and its various spinoff films and other productions, and the movie Moonrunners.

It is the oldest establishment in Hazzard County, and is owned by Boss Hogg. It is the main social gathering place for the Duke family—cousins Bo, Luke and Daisy, and their Uncle Jesse—and their friends and adversaries. One source describes it as the place "where the Dukes unwound with a beer at the end of most episodes". Daisy is employed as a waitress at the business. In the 2007 made-for-TV movie, The Dukes of Hazzard: The Beginning, she was depicted as being conservatively-dressed until she sought a job there, adopting her trademark "sexy attire" to gain the approval of bartender Hughie Hogg.

The establishment contains ample seating room for customers, a small kitchen and a bar. The main bar also contains a popcorn machine, a jukebox, a pinball machine, a pool table and pay telephone. There is also a small stage area, where plays, contests and performances by big-name country music stars perform, usually to settle trumped up traffic violations applied by Sheriff Rosco when they pass through his jurisdiction. One group shown performing there was The Oak Ridge Boys, twice featured on the show. Member Joe Bonsall wrote that these were "[t]wo of our most popular appearances on television". Cast member Ben Jones, who played mechanic Cooter in the series, explained:

We had an occasional piece at the end of some episodes called “Boss Hogg's Speed Trap", a musical ending that featured Nashville stars who had been stopped in Hazzard's speed trap and had to perform at the Boar's Nest in lieu of a huge fine. Boss, who owned the joint, would make a killing when Tammy Wynette or Roy Orbison did a show at his honky-tonk.

Jones noted that he suggested having James Brown appear in this way, which the cast supported. The network vetoed this, asserting that this would not appeal to the show's audience, which the cast considered an insulting reaction.

In the back of the restaurant is an office where Boss Hogg conducts many of his crooked business schemes. The basement has an escape tunnel, which was used in the days when the Hogg and Duke families were involved in moonshine running and were trying to elude the authorities.

Outside the business are two HoggoCo gas pumps and ample parking space. The parking lot often serves as the starting and finishing lines for various races that take place in Hazzard County.

In the 1997 The Dukes of Hazzard: Reunion! movie, the original Boar's Nest had been burned down by a wedding party, and a new one was built in town.

== Origin ==
The Boar's Nest was an actual bar in the area where Jerry Rushing used to run moonshine. His stories were the basis for the film Moonrunners (the precursor to the Dukes of Hazzard, and the first appearance of the Boar's Nest on camera). The fictional bar was also described as resembling the well-known honky-tonk, Gilley's, in Pasadena, Texas, which was used in the 1980 John Travolta film, Urban Cowboy.

The building used as the Boar's Nest at 290 Flat Rock Road, just north of Covington, Georgia, during the filming of the first five episodes of season one still exists. It is now being used as a church. During later filming of the TV series, the Boar's Nest was one of the standing sets at the Valencia Oaks ranch, near Los Angeles, California.
