= Home for Christmas (John Schneider and Tom Wopat album) =

Studio album by John Schneider and Tom Wopat
- Released: October 28, 2014
- Genre: Christmas, jazz
- Label: Distribution 13
- Producer: David Finck

Home for Christmas is a 2014 holiday duet album by American singers/actors John Schneider and Tom Wopat. The pair's most notable previous collaboration was portraying Bo and Luke Duke in The Dukes of Hazzard TV series from 1979–1985.

== Track listing ==
No.	Title	Writer(s)	Length
1.	"Merry Christmas"		00:16
2.	"Christmas Time is Here"		03:13
3.	"Santa Claus Is Comin' to Town"	John Frederick Coots, Haven Gillespie	3:05
4.	"Cool Yule"		03:20
5.	"I'll Be Home for Christmas"	Kim Gannon, Walter Kent, Buck Ram	03:33
6.	"Even the Snow"		03:12
7.	"Love"		00:13
8.	"Sleigh Ride"	Leroy Anderson	03:55
9.	"Christmas Waltz"		03:23
10.	"Johnny, It's Cold Outside"	Frank Loesser	3:23
11.	"The Secret of Christmas"	Sammy Cahn, Jimmy Van Heusen	03:08
12.	"Coal"		00:04
13.	"Blue Xmas"	Billy Hayes and Jay W. Johnson	02:52
14.	"Holiday Season"		02:48
15.	"Ponch & John"		00:13
16.	"On a Quiet Christmas Morn"		02:54
17.	"Silver Bells"	Jay Livingston, Ray Evans	02:48
18.	"Egg Nog"		00:12

== Charts ==
Chart (2014)	Peak position
Billboard Jazz Album Chart	12
