= The Dukes of Hazzard: The Beginning =

2007 television film directed by Robert Berlinger

- Title card
- Based on: Characters by Gy Waldron
- Written by: Shane Morris
- Directed by: Robert Berlinger
- Starring: Jonathan Bennett; Randy Wayne; April Scott; Joel David Moore; Harland Williams; Sherilyn Fenn; Chris McDonald; Willie Nelson
- Narrated by: Gary Cole
- Composer: John DeFaria
- Country of origin: United States
- Original language: English

Production
- Producers: Bill Gerber; Phillip B. Goldfine
- Cinematography: Roy H. Wagner
- Editor: Don Brochu
- Running time: 95 minutes
- Production companies: Warner Premiere; Gerber Pictures; Hollywood Media Bridge

Original release
- Network: ABC Family
- Release: March 4, 2007

Related
- The Dukes of Hazzard

The Dukes of Hazzard: The Beginning is a 2007 American made-for-television buddy comedy film and a standalone prequel to the 2005 film The Dukes of Hazzard. It is the fourth and final Dukes of Hazzard film. An edited version of the film originally aired on ABC Family channel on March 4, 2007, and the 'R'-rated and unrated versions were released on DVD March 13.

== Plot ==
Set in fictional towns of Georgia, Bo Duke is arrested for destructive driving in neighboring Chickasaw County. Luke Duke is arrested for blowing up illegal fireworks. Both of the teenage boys are paroled to the care of their Uncle Jesse in neighboring Hazzard County, sentenced to a summer of hard work on the farm.

Jesse is carrying on the family tradition of producing the best moonshine in the county. Bo and Luke quickly tire of farm work and take an interest in some of the local girls of Hazzard. Attempting to visit the Boar's Nest bar, they see Jesse meeting with Boss Hogg. Jesse is arranging for his regular bribe to the County Commissioner to look the other way from his illegal moonshine operation. The Duke boys inadvertently allow Hogg's prize pig to escape, and it falls off the roof and is injured. Furious, Boss Hogg demands a sizable amount of money from Jesse, due in two weeks, or he will foreclose on the farm.

Jesse believes his only recourse is his moonshine operation, but he cannot deliver enough in two weeks. Bo and Luke volunteer and set off to find a fast car to do the job.

The boys enlist the help of their cousin Daisy Duke, who has just turned 18 but is somewhat of a wallflower who wonders why boys do not notice her. She takes them to the high-school shop class, where they meet Cooter Davenport, who gives them a fast engine. They go to the junkyard to find a suitable car, but do not like what they see. On their way home, they find some girls sunbathing next to Hogg's Ravine while Cooter and the Duke cousins are standing together at a ledge overlooking a swimming hole. From high atop their rocky cliff, Bo purposefully shoves Luke in to try to impress the girls. Immediately thereafter, Bo learns from Cooter that most people who jump in end up either "crippled, on life support, or brain damaged." Not seeing Luke surface after plunging into the water, Bo jumps in to save him. Instead, Cooter is seen dragging Luke onto shore, while underwater, Bo discovers an abandoned 1969 Dodge Charger and believes it would be the perfect car for them. They retrieve the car from the pond, already in the iconic orange color with the Rebel flag painted on the top. They clean, repair and repaint the car, and after adding their new engine, the General Lee is reborn.

The moonshine deliveries go well but before they raise enough money to pay off Hogg, the Boss declares Hazzard a dry county, and offers a $25,000 reward for anyone who uncovers an illegal moonshine operation. He will turn the Boar's Nest into an ice cream parlor.

Meanwhile, Daisy applies for a job at the bar to help raise the money. Hughie, the Boar's Nest bartender, says she is not the type of girl who should work there, and refuses her but she is smitten. She undergoes a makeover to impress him, cutting her jeans into very short shorts, wearing a shirt tied to show her midriff and letting her hair down. The bar patrons are all stunned by how good she looks, and Hughie hires her immediately and agrees to take her on a date.

Jesse then holds a large party to raise funds for the farm, but Boss Hogg and Sheriff Rosco arrest Jesse for illegal moonshine sales and seize Jesse's assets. Daisy, Bo and Luke visit him in jail, and he tells them that Boss is as corrupt as anyone, and the best way to get Jesse off is to find evidence of this. Bo and Luke soon discover Hogg's plan. He wants to convince all the county commissioners in Georgia to ban alcohol, thus paving the way for a thriving ice cream business. More importantly, with all the ridgerunners in jail, Hogg will then be free to make a fortune selling his own illegal alcohol, turning the Boar's Nest into a speakeasy.

Boss Hogg wants the Duke family still, which produces the best moonshine in the county. When Daisy finds out Hughie is Boss Hogg's nephew and only dated her to find out about the family secrets, she is devastated.

The Dukes kidnap Boss and ride off in the General Lee with the police following in pursuit. They threaten to drive into Hogg Ravine unless he tells them his plan. He is too scared not to tell, and his confession is broadcast over the radio thanks to Daisy's manipulation of Enos at the station. The Dukes then jump the ravine anyway (their first jump), and catch Hughie delivering illegal moonshine into Hazzard. The Dukes make Boss pay them the $25,000 reward, which they use to buy back the farm.

Fed up with Hogg, the citizens demand he reverse his dry county policy and free all the people he had arrested for selling moonshine. Just as it seems the 112-year-old candidate who always wanted to run for county commissioner will finally win, he dies, leaving Boss as the only candidate, and he is re-elected anyway. Hogg summarily pardons himself for his misdeeds, but is forced to release Jesse and the other moonshiners. As payback to Hughie for using her, Daisy kicks him into his jail cell before removing her shirt and leaving. Bo finally gets a driving instructor who passes him despite his wild driving, and Luke finally meets a girl who likes watching stuff blowing up. The cousins hop into the General Lee, headed off on their next adventure.

== Cast ==
- Jonathan Bennett as Bo Duke
- Randy Wayne as Luke Duke
- April Scott as Daisy Duke
- Adam Shulman as Enos Strate
- Willie Nelson as Uncle Jesse
- Chris McDonald as Boss Hogg
- Sherilyn Fenn as Lulu Coltrane Hogg
- Harland Williams as Sheriff Rosco P. Coltrane
- Joel Moore as Cooter Davenport
- Gary Cole as The Balladeer (voice)
- Jennifer Hill as Brooke Handy
- Trishelle Cannatella as Ally Handy
- Todd Grinnell as Hughie Hogg
- Sy Richardson as Shiner
- Kimberly Bosso as Hogget Hottie
- Challen Cates as Psychic

== Home media ==
ABC Family first aired an edited version of the film on March 4, 2007, prior to its DVD release. 'R'-rated and unrated versions were released on DVD March 13.

== Production ==
The film was produced under Warner Bros.' Warner Premiere label with a budget of $5 million. Willie Nelson was the only actor to reprise his role from the previous film.

== Reception ==
Reviews were generally negative. On review aggregator Rotten Tomatoes, the film has an approval rating of 20% based on 5 reviews, with an average score of 3.5/10.
