= The Dukes of Hazzard: Reunion! =

1997 American television film

- The cast of The Dukes of Hazzard reunites.
- Genre: Action; Adventure; Comedy
- Written by: Gy Waldron
- Directed by: Lewis Teague
- Starring: John Schneider; Tom Wopat; Catherine Bach; Denver Pyle; James Best; Ben Jones; Sonny Shroyer; Rick Hurst
- Music by: Steve Wariner
- Country of origin: United States
- Original language: English

Production
- Executive producer: Gy Waldron
- Producers: Ira Marvin; Skip Ward
- Production location: Los Angeles
- Cinematography: Barry M. Wilson
- Editor: Russell Livingstone
- Running time: 90 minutes
- Production companies: Kudzu Productions; Warner Bros. Television

Original release
- Network: CBS
- Release: April 25, 1997

The Dukes of Hazzard: Reunion! is a 1997 American made-for-television action-adventure film, reuniting the surviving cast members of the 1979–1985 television series The Dukes of Hazzard, which originally aired on CBS on April 25, 1997. The film is the first of four Dukes of Hazzard films. It was directed by Lewis Teague, written by series creator Gy Waldron, and produced by Ira Marvin and Skip Ward.

The popularity of The Dukes of Hazzard reruns on The Nashville Network led to a rejuvenated interest in the franchise, which resulted in the reunion film. A sequel reunion film, titled The Dukes of Hazzard: Hazzard in Hollywood, was released in 2000.

== Plot ==
Hazzard County is having a reunion festival. Uncle Jesse faces a lawsuit filed by Mama Josephine Maxx for access across Duke property to the Hazzard swamp, where she intends to build a theme park. Jesse had refused access in order to preserve the swamp and now residents are angry with Jesse, as the theme park would bring jobs and revenue to Hazzard County.

Cooter Davenport, now a Congressman, arrives to meet Jesse at the Duke farm. Bo Duke, now a professional racer, arrives thereafter, followed by Daisy Duke, who has been at Duke University getting a PhD in ecology after a bitter divorce. Luke Duke, now a smokejumper for the forestry service, arrives at the farm. Everyone is surprised to learn that Sheriff Rosco is now also the county boss after he inherited Boss Hogg's "empire" when he died.

The Dukes get suckered into an overland car race to determine whether or not Maxx gets access to the swamp. Enos Strate arrives from Los Angeles, where he is working as an officer with the LAPD. After 11 years in storage, the Dukes repair the General Lee for the race and take it for a test run, but the car is overturned by an unknown assailant. Cooter repairs the General while the Dukes spend time at the Boar's Nest, now in a new location. Bo recognizes the men who ran them off the road, including a disbarred race driver named Kam Cutler, who they learn was hired by Mama Maxx to win the race.

After a bar fight with Maxx's men, the Dukes return to Cooter, who warns them that the General cannot sustain another attack. When Luke begins considering a few dirty tricks of their own, Jesse tells them that they will run the race fairly, and that no causeway can be built to the Hazzard Swamp because the ground will not support such a thing, due to the lack of supporting bedrock.

At the Hazzard Swamp, Daisy and Enos have a picnic and he confesses the only reason he returned to Hazzard was so he could ask her to marry him, which she accepts. Mama Maxx has her men kidnap Daisy after learning that she spotted gallium arsenide ore in the swamp. Maxx will only release Daisy if Bo and Luke lose the race. Daisy convinces Mama Maxx to have her men run errands for her wedding, stating that the lack of wedding preparations will cause unwanted attention. After a passionate request, Maxx agrees to help with the wedding plans herself. Maxx eventually accepts Daisy's request to be her matron of honor.

The race between Kam and the Dukes begins, with Kam driving in Buzz's "Double Zero", the only car to beat the General Lee in an overland car race. The Dukes win, and Luke pulls Ryker out of the trunk and tells Rosco he kidnapped Daisy on Maxx's orders so they would lose the race. Rosco tells Mama Maxx how stupid he believes she is, stating that he conned her into building the theme park. Rosco had obtained a sample of gallium arsenide ore and put it in the swamp so Maxx would find it. He also reveals that the FBI sent him a list of the country's ten most wanted real estate con artists, with Maxx at number one. Rosco reveals that his plan was inspired by a quote in Boss Hogg's memoir that offered advice regarding con artists.

Daisy prevents Rosco from arresting Mama Maxx so she can attend the wedding. Before they are married, a bus pulls up and the driver turns out to be Daisy's ex-husband, L. D., who is lost. After seeing L. D., Daisy realizes she is not ready to get married again. Bubba and Bertha Jo get married instead.

== Cast ==
- Tom Wopat as Luke Duke
- John Schneider as Bo Duke
- Catherine Bach as Daisy Duke
- Denver Pyle as Uncle Jesse
- James Best as Rosco P. Coltrane
- Ben Jones as Cooter Davenport
- Sonny Shroyer as Enos Strate
- Rick Hurst as Cletus
- Don Williams as The Balladeer
- Gary Hudson as Riker
- Cynthia Rothrock as Bertha Jo
- Stella Stevens as Mama Maxx
- Daniel Anderson as Buzz
- Travis McKenna as Bubba

== Production ==
In February 1996, The Nashville Network (TNN) began airing reruns of The Dukes of Hazzard, which became successful in the ratings. By November 1996, there were plans for a reunion special. Schneider said a reunion special had been an idea for years but that prior attempts to create it were unsuccessful. Series creator Gy Waldron wrote the script and served as the film's executive producer. Waldron had written a version of the reunion script as early as 1988, three years after the original series had ended. For the reunion movie, this original pitch was then updated to reflect the passing of time, and to work around the death of Sorrell Booke in 1994.

The film was shot in Los Angeles. When filming began, Denver Pyle had lost a significant amount of weight, had short hair and (save for a moustache) was clean shaven. He was given a "fat suit" to wear, similar to what Booke had worn when playing Boss Hogg. A scruffy white wig was placed under Pyle's trademark red cap, and a false white beard was applied to his face using spirit gum. Pyle's weight loss was attributed to the fact he was suffering from lung cancer at the time. The film was Pyle's final performance before his death on Christmas Day, 1997.

Waylon Jennings did not reprise his role as "The Balladeer" in the film. Country singer Don Williams served as the narrator instead. Jennings' "Good Ol' Boys" opening theme song for the series was not used for the film. Instead, Wopat and Schneider created a new opening song for the film. The production used some of the original General Lee cars from the television series. Stunts were supervised by Paul Baxley. Cooter Davenport is portrayed in the film as a United States Congressman. This reflects how Ben Jones, who portrays Cooter, really was a Congressman (D-GA) from 1989 to 1993. The film was dedicated "In Loving Memory" to those members of the series cast and crew who had died: Phil Mandelker, Sorrell Booke (spelled incorrectly as "Sorrel"), Paul Picard and Jim Mohlmann.

== Release ==
The Dukes of Hazzard: Reunion! aired on CBS on April 25, 1997. The movie was released on Region 1 DVD along with the second reunion film The Dukes of Hazzard: Hazzard in Hollywood on June 10, 2008. Both films were later released on DVD in Region 4 on June 4, 2014.

== Reception ==
The film's premiere broadcast resulted in CBS' highest Friday rating since the reunion special Dallas: J.R. Returns, which aired the previous year. Todd Everett of Variety called the stunts "terrific" and wrote that Teague and editor Russell Livingstone kept the "convoluted story clear and moving, and pic looks sharp, if not especially costly." Everett also wrote that while the film did not break "any new ground," it "should satisfy fans of the series".

In 2008, Paul Mavis of DVDTalk called the film "a silly little trifle that somewhat approximates the feel of the original show," but wrote, "It doesn't help, right out of the gate, that The Dukes of Hazzard: Reunion! starts off with a different theme song […], making the viewer momentarily stop and wonder what they're watching—particularly since that Jennings theme song is so ingrained in the original Dukes experience." Mavis further stated "there's no denying that the loss of Sorrell Booke (who had died in 1994) impacts the franchise greatly." Mavis felt that Stevens' character "is so sketchily laid out, that even her funny bits with Bach fall largely flat," and noted that James Best's scenes feel "forced and rather lonely" without Booke: "We're left with a scene with Best, almost crying over a portrait of Boss Hogg. I don't want to see that in a Dukes reunion film." Mavis believed that Wopat "seems alternately distant or grumpy" compared to Schneider; that Pyle "is visibly ill and failing"; and that the new characters of Bertha Jo and Bubba did "absolutely nothing for the Hazzard mythos, while returning characters Enos, Cooter and Cletus aren't given a whole lot to do […]. As for the action, it's not plentiful enough, either, to compare with the earlier TV series."
