= Daisy Duke =

- Dukes of Hazzard character
- Daisy Duke, played by Catherine Bach
- First appearance: "One Armed Bandits", first episode of The Dukes of Hazzard
- Created by: Gy Waldron
- Portrayed by: Catherine Bach – 1979–1985, 1997, 2000; Jessica Simpson – 2005; April Scott – 2007

In-universe information
- Gender: Female
- Occupation: Waitress
- Significant other: Deputy Enos Strate
- Relatives: Bo Duke (cousin); Luke Duke (cousin); Coy Duke (cousin); Vance Duke (cousin); Jesse Duke (uncle); Jud Duke (cousin); Dixie Duke (great-great grandmother)
- Nationality: American

Daisy Duke is a fictional character from the American television series The Dukes of Hazzard. She is the cousin of the protagonists, Bo and Luke, and all three live on a farm on the outskirts of Hazzard County with their Uncle Jesse.

In the television series and the films The Dukes of Hazzard: Reunion! (1997) and The Dukes of Hazzard: Hazzard in Hollywood (2000) she was played by Catherine Bach. In the 2005 film, The Dukes of Hazzard, she was played by Jessica Simpson, and by April Scott in the 2007 prequel film The Dukes of Hazzard: The Beginning.

Although never mentioned in the series itself, some press material for the show suggests that Daisy's parents, along with Bo and Luke's, were killed in a car accident; in the 1997 reunion movie, Daisy says her mother died when she was a baby. The series never explained how they all came to live with Uncle Jesse.

Daisy frequently becomes involved in the Dukes' car chases, originally in her Plymouth Road Runner or, from the mid-second season onwards and more famously, in her Jeep. Daisy also works as a waitress at the Boar's Nest, the local tavern owned by Boss Hogg that was the main meeting place in Hazzard. She also aspires to be both a singer-songwriter and a journalist.

== Character ==
"She drives like Richard Petty, shoots like Annie Oakley, and knows the words to all of Dolly Parton's songs."

— The Balladeer, "One Armed Bandits"

Daisy Duke is a well-meaning though rather naive, often scantily dressed rogue Southern belle with an outgoing and feisty personality. Brought up by her wise Uncle Jesse, Daisy always believes in doing the right thing and helping others. She has a habit of landing herself and her family in trouble, often falling in love with criminals despite the warnings of her family. Although she is not quite as good at driving as her cousins Bo and Luke, Daisy is a relatively talented driver. She often gets involved in the ongoing war between Boss Hogg and her family, helping out where she can. Her job at The Boar's Nest gives her the opportunity to eavesdrop on private conversations between Boss, Sheriff Rosco and various cohorts, often discovering important information that she can pass on to Uncle Jesse and the Duke boys.

== Love interests ==
Daisy never finds a long-lasting beau over the course of the series, though Deputy Enos Strate has a long-running crush on her that spans the life of the series. This crush is largely unrequited, although Daisy is aware of it and often displays genuine care and concern for the likeable Enos. In the penultimate episode of the show's run, "Enos and Daisy's Wedding," the pair plan to hastily get married as a way to avoid Daisy having to testify against Enos, though the situation is eventually resolved before the wedding takes place. In his recurring appearances during the show (typically once per season), Boss Hogg's nephew Hughie also displays a romantic interest in Daisy (he actually feels no genuine respect or affection for her, however; he merely harbors a selfish lust for her beauty), although Daisy loathes the idea, and there is occasionally a vague hint of a possible previous romantic falling-out between the pair. The fourth season opening episode, "Mrs. Daisy Hogg," sees Daisy falling in love and planning to marry another one of Boss's nephews, Jaimie Lee Hogg (the character's only appearance in the series), although before the wedding she realises he is a villain and the marriage is called off. Similarly, in the second-season episode "Duke of Duke," Daisy becomes attracted to a visiting English Duke claiming to be a distant relation of the Duke clan; she eventually finds out he is a con man and again the romance is over.

In the 1997 reunion movie, she is said to have left Hazzard to get married at some point after the original series, but is subsequently divorced. After her marriage ended, she was pursuing a graduate degree at Duke University, and upon her return to Hazzard agrees to marry Enos Strate, who reveals he had been writing weekly love letters to Daisy for many years (tying into Enos's own spin-off series), but backs out at the last minute due to both the sudden reappearance of her ex-husband, and for fear of another debacle like her first marriage.

== Vehicles ==
Daisy's first car in the series is a yellow 1974 Plymouth Road Runner with a black stripe along the sides and over the roof. Although the car was intended to be a Plymouth Road Runner, later appearances in the second season used a 1971 Plymouth Satellite with a matching "Road Runner" stripe running along the sides and over the roof. The car meets its demise when the accelerator sticks while Bo and Luke are driving it during a chase in the second-season episode "The Runaway," sending it over a cliff. Because the episodes were broadcast in a different order to that in which they were filmed, the Plymouth makes several reappearances after its supposed destruction (additionally, after the Plymouth has been destroyed on-screen, several models of the car appear in various episodes with different paint jobs, serving as other vehicles within the context of the stories) until The Dukes of Hazzard II: Daisy Dukes It Out.

After losing that car, at the end of "The Runaway" she receives her trademark white 1980 Jeep CJ-7 "Golden Eagle," named Dixie. The initial version of the Jeep seen at the end of this episode is noticeably different from what soon becomes the standard version, with a slightly different paint job, doors with "Dixie" painted on, and "Golden Eagle" printed on the hood on either side of an eagle emblem. After this and its second appearance, in the episode "Arrest Jesse Duke" (produced after "The Runaway" but actually broadcast before, creating a continuity error), bar a couple of stock footage shots of the Jeep parked outside of the Duke farm where the initial design can be seen, the design changes to a lighter paint job, no doors, and "Dixie" painted alongside the emblem on the hood. However, as with other vehicles in the show, there are different versions of the Jeep used for filming of various episodes. Sometimes the Jeep has a slightly different paint scheme, and alternates between automatic and manual transmissions. The design of the roll-bars also varies slightly across the seasons.

On a number of occasions Daisy also drives Uncle Jesse's pickup truck, and certain storylines occasionally call for her to drive the General Lee.

== Appearance ==
Daisy Duke is both the main female protagonist and the sex symbol on Dukes of Hazzard. In two episodes Daisy wears a red bikini to distract Cletus and a truck driver. She appears numerous times wearing short, tight denim shorts, which later became colloquially known as "Daisy Dukes".

The network censors believed that Daisy's famous denim cut-off shorts alone would be too revealing. The shorts were so short that the only way the producers could get them on air was for Catherine Bach to wear flesh-colored pantyhose with them to ensure that the shorts revealed no more of her than intended. Bach herself had concerns about the shorts, saying she could not wear them in a restaurant scene in the show. The producers suggested that Bach go and see what the girls were wearing in the restaurant across the street; she found the waitresses there were wearing "little miniskirts that matched the tablecloths!" Bach made many of Daisy's costumes herself, especially the early ones, including the red bikini in the first episode, which is seen during the show's opening credits.

At the suggestion of the show's producers, Bach posed as Daisy Duke for a poster, which sold 5 million copies. The poster created unexpected admiration from Nancy Reagan and other staff after Bach visited, then sent a copy to one of her former schoolteachers employed in the White House.

== In film ==
=== 2005 version ===
In the 2005 feature film The Dukes of Hazzard, Daisy Duke is portrayed by Jessica Simpson. Film critics commended Simpson on her performance, but claimed that her portrayal had little in common with the character Catherine Bach created, and that she was merely cast because of her celebrity status.

Daisy's costume was slightly modified for the film to make her more overtly sexual: her Daisy Dukes were shorter than they had been on the series, and her shirts showed much more cleavage than Bach's ever had. She also did not wear pantyhose under her shorts, going bare-legged in the film. Another difference in her appearance was that Simpson's hair remained blonde, whereas Bach's was brunette. Simpson did, however, wear a brunette wig as a disguise during the film, and her hair was a darker blonde in the music video for "These Boots Are Made for Walkin'".

=== 2007 film ===
In the 2007 film The Dukes of Hazzard: The Beginning, Daisy starts out as an innocent Bible school girl and does not dress particularly attractively. She wears large flannel shirts, jeans, big glasses, and her hair in a bun. To get a job as a waitress at the Boar's Nest and to attract Hughie Hogg (Boss's nephew), she decides to change her look. She goes through several outfits before finally settling on her signature look. She is also a brunette in this movie. Daisy is played by April Scott.
