= Sheriff Rosco P. Coltrane =

Character from The Dukes of Hazzard

Roscoe P. Coltrane
- The Dukes of Hazzard character
- First appearance: "One Armed Bandits", first episode of The Dukes of Hazzard
- Portrayed by: James Best - 1979; M.C. Gainey - 2005; Harland Williams - 2007

In-universe information
- Gender: Male
- Occupation: Sheriff
- Relatives: Lulu Coltrane-Hogg (older sister); Boss Hogg (brother-in-law); Hughie Hogg (nephew-in-law); Jamie Lee Hogg (nephew-in-law)
- Nationality: American

Rosco Purvis Coltrane is a fictional sheriff character who first appeared in the 1975 film Moonrunners, which inspired the creation of the American TV series The Dukes of Hazzard (and related spin-off films).

In Moonrunners, he was played by Bruce Atkins. The role of Rosco in the television series was played by James Best in a much more developed character than the one in Moonrunners. On the television series, Rosco is the right-hand man of Hazzard County's corrupt county commissioner, Jefferson Davis "J.D." Hogg also known as "Boss Hogg"). Best appeared as Rosco in all but five episodes out of 147 over seven seasons. He was accompanied on the show by his character's pet/police dog (beginning in season 3), a Basset Hound named Flash. Rosco's name is sometimes spelled with an E as Roscoe, which is incorrect; James Best corrected this popular misconception on his website. As in Moonrunners from which The Dukes of Hazzard TV series evolved, in the first season the character's name is given as "Rosco Coltrane". The initial "P." was added from the start of the second season, after Best convinced show producers that it gave him more to play with vocally when pronouncing it. The "P." stands for Purvis.

== Rosco in The Dukes of Hazzard ==
=== Early episodes ===
In early episodes, the character of Rosco was a serious one. He was depicted as a hard-nosed, focused, and aggressive sheriff, and actually shot a criminal (not fatally) in an early episode ("Mary Kaye's Baby", the third episode broadcast). He was a willing accomplice to Boss Hogg's schemes, and also appeared to have the ingenuity to arrange such schemes himself (in the pilot episode, "One Armed Bandits", for example, he seems to be the key organizer behind the illegal importation of slot machines into the county). The "One Armed Bandits" episode also explained that Rosco had served Hazzard County for 20 years as "a fairly honest lawman" but became embittered after his pension was wiped out following a failed bond referendum, and with just a few months left in office he was forced to run for re-election instead of retiring.

This notion was explored again in a couple of other early episodes, most notably a scene where Deputy Enos asks him why he became so corrupt, in the fourth broadcast episode, "Repo Men". When series creator Gy Waldron realized that the series had become very popular with young children, the character was toned down to the more comedic and more bumbling persona for which he is best known, a characterization that Best himself largely created. He never wanted children viewing to feel afraid to approach a police officer when in need.

=== General information ===
Rosco frequently initiates car chases with Bo and Luke Duke (Hogg's most frequent adversaries), but the Duke boys are usually able to elude Rosco, who frequently wrecks his patrol car in various ways.

Starting with the third season (1980–1981), Rosco got a pet dog—a lazy Basset Hound he calls "Flash" and nicknames "Velvet Ears" which he dotes on. Flash liked the Dukes but always barked at Boss Hogg. Early on, the dog's gender was male, but this was changed in later episodes.

Boss Hogg and Rosco are brothers-in-law because Rosco's older sister Lulu is married to Boss Hogg.

Rosco has just more than $43 in his savings account, and often tries to join Boss in indulging in high-calorie dishes (which usually results in him getting his hands slapped). His patrol car (in the first season a 1974 Dodge Monaco or a 1970 Dodge Polara (first two episodes), 1974–5 AMC Matador, and 1976 Plymouth Fury. In later seasons a 1977 or 1978 Dodge Monaco or Plymouth Fury) which also serves as his daily driver except for a few episodes where he has other cars, such as a 1977 Pontiac Lemans in the 3rd season episode "To Catch a Duke" which he apparently saved his nickels and dimes for, as he claims. This car can routinely be seen parked outside the Police station in stock footage exterior shots for the rest of the series. His personal vehicle in the 5th-season episode "The Revenge of Hughie Hogg" is a 1967–1968 Chevrolet Impala which he kicks apart. Rosco carries a pearl-handled Smith & Wesson Model 15 (a Smith & Wesson Model 10 in the pilot episode, and also the opening credits for the show), with which he is an expert shot, although when he has to use it in the line of duty, he gets too nervous to hit anything (the exception being the first-season episode, "Mary Kaye's Baby" when he shot a criminal in a shoot out). His main deputies—whom he often calls "dipstick"—include Enos Strate and Cletus Hogg. Although he often henpecks and belittles his deputies, he also shows great concern when they might be in real danger.

Rosco's mentality is that of a clumsy, somewhat slow-witted buffoon. He speaks often with a childish vernacular and repeats his favorite catchphrases constantly. One that has always been featured when Rosco arrests the Duke boys or anyone else for that matter is "Cuff 'em and stuff 'em!" One aspect of Rosco's personality that was well-loved and became synonymous with him was a choppy and excited chuckle that was produced from the back of the throat ("Kew-kew-kew-kew!") and became one of the most recognizable aspects of the character (a clip of this laugh was played over the closing Warner Bros. Television logo on the end credits for most episodes, though it sometimes alternated with a clip of Boss Hogg yelling "Them Dukes, them Dukes!"). He is easily excitable and genuinely enjoys law enforcement, especially chasing criminals, which he refers to as "hot pursuit".

Rosco was married briefly in an episode, "Mrs. Rosco P. Coltrane", during the third season (1980–1981), to a woman he purportedly met through a computer dating service, but the marriage was a sham—his "bride" robbed banks with her husband and his associate — and the union was quickly annulled. This episode was also the only episode to feature Rosco's mother, and the only episode to reveal that the initial 'P' stood for Purvis.

Rosco has shown on numerous occasions (especially on episodes where characters either were thought to have died or found themselves in serious trouble) that he is much more of a caring man than he ordinarily lets on. This is particularly clear when the safety of his best friend Boss Hogg is threatened by somebody.

During the second season (1979–1980) of the series, James Best left over a dispute about the changing-room conditions. His gripe was that he did not mind getting soaked or covered in mud when filming Rosco crashing his car into rivers and such, but was unhappy with the poor changing facilities afterwards. During his absence, Rosco was replaced by a number of stand-in sheriffs (played by such actors as James Hampton and Dick Sargent). Eventually the dispute was settled, and Best returned as Rosco, remaining for the rest of the show's run.

Following the death of actor Sorrell Booke who played Boss Hogg, the first reunion film also showed that Boss Hogg had died. Rosco inherited his money (and documents of dirty schemes) and he also became Hazzard's new county commissioner as well as continuing to serve as sheriff.

== In other media ==
=== Cartoon ===
Roscoe appears in the animated spin-off The Dukes, voiced by James Best. He and Flash join Boss Hogg in racing against the Duke boys and Daisy who want the win the prize money so that Boss Hogg won't foreclose on the family farm. As Boss Hogg actually wants the money and land for himself, Roscoe and Flash help him in various schemes to make sure the Dukes lose with comical results. During the racing part, Roscoe drives Boss Hogg's vehicle.

=== Film ===
- The character originated in the 1975 film Moonrunners and was played by Bruce Atkins. This film was the precursor to The Dukes of Hazzard. Although more of a secondary character in this movie, the role was a more serious version of Rosco, with mention of going crooked because the county took away his pension (something that was mentioned in early episodes of The Dukes).
- M. C. Gainey portrayed Rosco in the 2005 film The Dukes of Hazzard. Gainey's Rosco did not incorporate the childlike qualities of Best's interpretation as this version was portrayed as a much more serious and wicked sheriff who genuinely detested the Dukes.
- Harland Williams played Rosco in The Dukes of Hazzard: The Beginning. His portrayal was much more in line with Best's bumbling portrayal from the TV series. This version of Rosco was said to have been married and was lodging with Boss Hogg and Lulu after his wife had thrown him out.

== See also ==
- J.W. Pepper
- Buford T. Justice
- Sheriff Lobo
