= The Legend of Frank Woods =

1977 film

- Directed by: Richard Robinson; Hagen Smith
- Written by: Hagen Smith
- Produced by: Deno Paoli
- Starring: Troy Donahue; Emile Meyer; Hagen Smith; Rick Hurst; Kitty Vallacher
- Release date: 1977
- Country: United States
- Language: English

The Legend of Frank Woods is a 1977 Western film, a re-edited version a 1972 film entitled The Hell You Preach.

== Plot ==
Gunslinger Frank Woods is caught in a shootout and kills three drunks in self-defense. In fear for his life, Woods escapes to the Arizona desert.
