= Rick Hurst =

American actor (1946–2025)

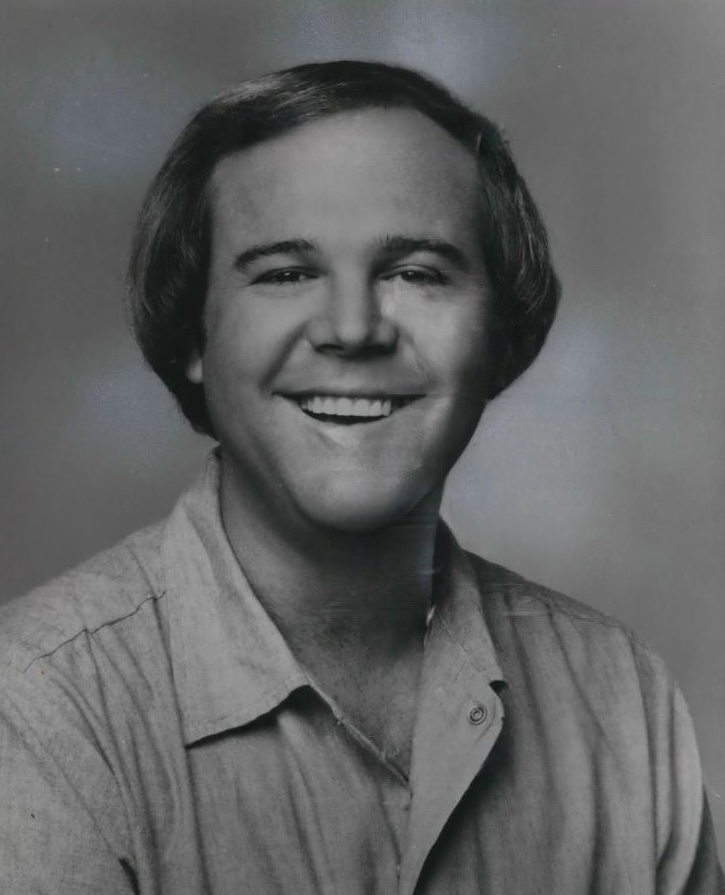
- Hurst in 1975
- Born: Richard Douglas Hurst; January 1, 1946; Houston, Texas, U.S.
- Died: June 26, 2025 (aged 79); Los Angeles, California, U.S.
- Education: Tulane University (BA, 1968); Temple University (MFA, 1970)
- Occupation: Actor
- Years active: 1970–2012
- Spouse: Shelly Weir
- Children: Ryan and Collin Hurst

Richard Douglas Hurst (January 1, 1946 – June 26, 2025) was an American actor who portrayed Deputy Cletus Hogg, Boss Hogg's cousin, in the 1980 to 1983 seasons of The Dukes of Hazzard as well as The Dukes of Hazzard: Reunion! in 1997 and The Dukes of Hazzard: Hazzard in Hollywood in 2000.

Hurst also starred as Earl, the chef in the short-lived Bea Arthur series Amanda's.

He appeared in many films, including The Karate Kid Part III (1989) as the Announcer. He made numerous appearances at various Dukes of Hazzard events and at Cooters in Nashville and Gatlinburg, Tennessee. He also made appearances at The World Of Wheels in Birmingham, Alabama.

== Personal life and death ==
Hurst was born in Houston on January 1, 1946. In 1968, he earned a bachelor's degree from Tulane University, followed by a master's in fine arts from Temple University in 1970. His sons are actor Ryan Hurst, and Collin Hurst. He was married to Shelly Weir, the mother of Collin.

Hurst died in Los Angeles on June 26, 2025, at the age of 79.

== Filmography ==
- The Doris Day Show (TV series) as Mechanic, episode "Happiness Is Not Being Fired" (1971)
- Sanford and Son (TV series) as Police Officer, episode "The Piano Movers" (1972)
- The Partridge Family (TV series) as Deputy Haynie, episode "M is for the Many Things" (1972)
- Unholy Rollers (1972) as Mover
- The Doris Day Show (TV series) as Herb, episode "Anniversary Gift" (1972)
- To Hell You Preach (1972)
- The Bob Newhart Show (1972–1978) as Maintenance Man, episode "Motel" (1973)
- Love, American Style (TV series 1969–1974) on Season 4, Episode 14 (1973) and on Season 5, Episode 3 (1973)
- Kung Fu (TV series 1972–1975) as Tubbs, episode "The Chalice" (1973)
- Gunsmoke (TV series 1955–1975) as Mayhew, episode "Kitty's Love Affair" (1973)
- Kojak (TV series 1973–1978) Crew Cut Hostage (as Richard Hurst), episode "Siege of Terror" (1973)
- Executive Action (1973) as Used Car Salesman
- The Girl with Something Extra (TV Series 1973–1974), episode "It's So Peaceful in the Country" (1973)
- Happy Days (TV Series 1974–1984) as Cook, episode "All the Way" (1974)
- Get Christie Love! (TV Movie 1974) as Sergeant Tom Farrell
- It's Good to Be Alive (TV Movie 1974) as Ambulance Attendant
- Little House on the Prairie (TV Series) as Jacob Jacobsen, episode "100 Mile Walk" (1974)
- Paper Moon (TV Series 1974–1975), episode "The Manly Art" (1974)
- The Six Million Dollar Man (TV Series 1974–1978) as Connors, episode "The Midas Touch" (1974)
- Keep Off My Grass! (1975) as Grady Talbot
- The Blue Knight (TV Series 1975–1976) as Detective Harriman, episode "Pilot" (1975)
- W.W. and the Dixie Dancekings (1975) as Butterball
- Tunnel Vision (1976) as Father
- On the Rocks (TV Series 1975–1976) as Cleaver
- M*A*S*H (TV Series 1972–1983) as Capt. Schaeffer, episode "Fade Out, Fade In" (1977)
- The Legend of Frank Woods (1977) as Ace Starkey
- Baretta (TV Series 1975–1978) as Charlie, episode "Lyman P. Dokker, Fed" (1977)
- The Cat from Outer Space (1978) as Dydee Guard
- M*A*S*H (TV Series 1972–1983) as Schaeffer, episode "Our Finest Hour" (1978)
- From Here to Eternity (1979 TV Mini-Series) as Pfc. Hanson
- Supertrain (1979 TV Series) as David, episode "Where Have You Been Billy Boy" (1979)
- CHiPs (TV Series) as The Movie Director, episode "Death Watch"
- Going Ape! (1981) as Brandon
- The Dukes of Hazzard (TV Series 1979–1985) as Cletus, 47 episodes (1979–1982)
- Amanda's (1983 TV Series) as Earl Nash, 13 episodes
- Wildside (TV Series 1984) as Floyd Fussell, episode "Don't Keep the Home Fires Burning"
- The Karate Kid (1984) as Announcer
- Highway to Heaven (TV Series 1984–1989) as Burt Morgan, episode "Birds of a Feather" (1985)
- The Last Precinct (TV Series 1986) as Albert the Ape, episode "Pilot"
- Blue City (1986) as Redneck
- Jackals (1986) as Harley
- The Karate Kid Part II (1986) as Announcer
- Starman (TV Series 1986–1987) as Charlie Ewing, episode "Blue Lights" (1986)
- Sidekicks (TV Series 1986–1987) as Berglund, episode "The Boy Who Saw Too Much" (1987)
- Earth Girls Are Easy (1988) as Joe the Cop
- Murder, She Wrote (TV Series) as Police Chief Slocum, episode "Something Borrowed, Someone Blue" (1989)
- The Karate Kid Part III (1989) as Announcer
- Worth Winning (1989) as Big Bouncin' Bob
- 227 (TV Series) as Bronco Bob, episodes "How the West Was Fun: Part 1" (1989) "How the West Was Fun": Part 2 (1989)
- Steel Magnolias (1989) as Bark Boone
- Perfect Strangers (TV Series 1986–1983) as Uncle Shaggy, episode "Digging Up the News" (1990)
- The Wonder Years (TV Series 1988–1993) as Harry Detweiler, episode "Growing Up" (1990)
- Good Grief (TV Series) as Buckaroo Bob, episode "Cub Scouts and Horses & Whiskers on Kittens" (1990)
- Evening Shade (TV Series) as Nelson, episode "Something to Hold on To" (1990)
- In the Line of Fire (1993) as Bartender
- Family Matters (TV Series) as Santa, episode "Christmas Is Where the Heart Is" (1993)
- Melrose Place (TV Series) as Sydney's Client, episode "Under the Mistletoe" (1993)
- The John Larroquette Show (TV Series) as Richard, episode "In the Pink" (1995)
- The Client (TV Series) as Officer Grindle, episode "Drive, He Said" (1995)
- The Dukes of Hazzard: Reunion! (1997 TV Movie) as Deputy Cletus Hogg
- Anywhere But Here (1999) as Reverend
- Suckers (2001) as Texas Customer
- The Dukes of Hazzard: Hazzard in Hollywood (2000 TV Movie) as Deputy Cletus Hogg
- Venomous (2001) as Edgar Williams
- The Guardian (TV Series) as Frank Churchill, episode "Ambition" (2003)
- Return of the Killer Shrews (2012) as Harold Rook
