= Sonny Shroyer =

American actor (born 1935)

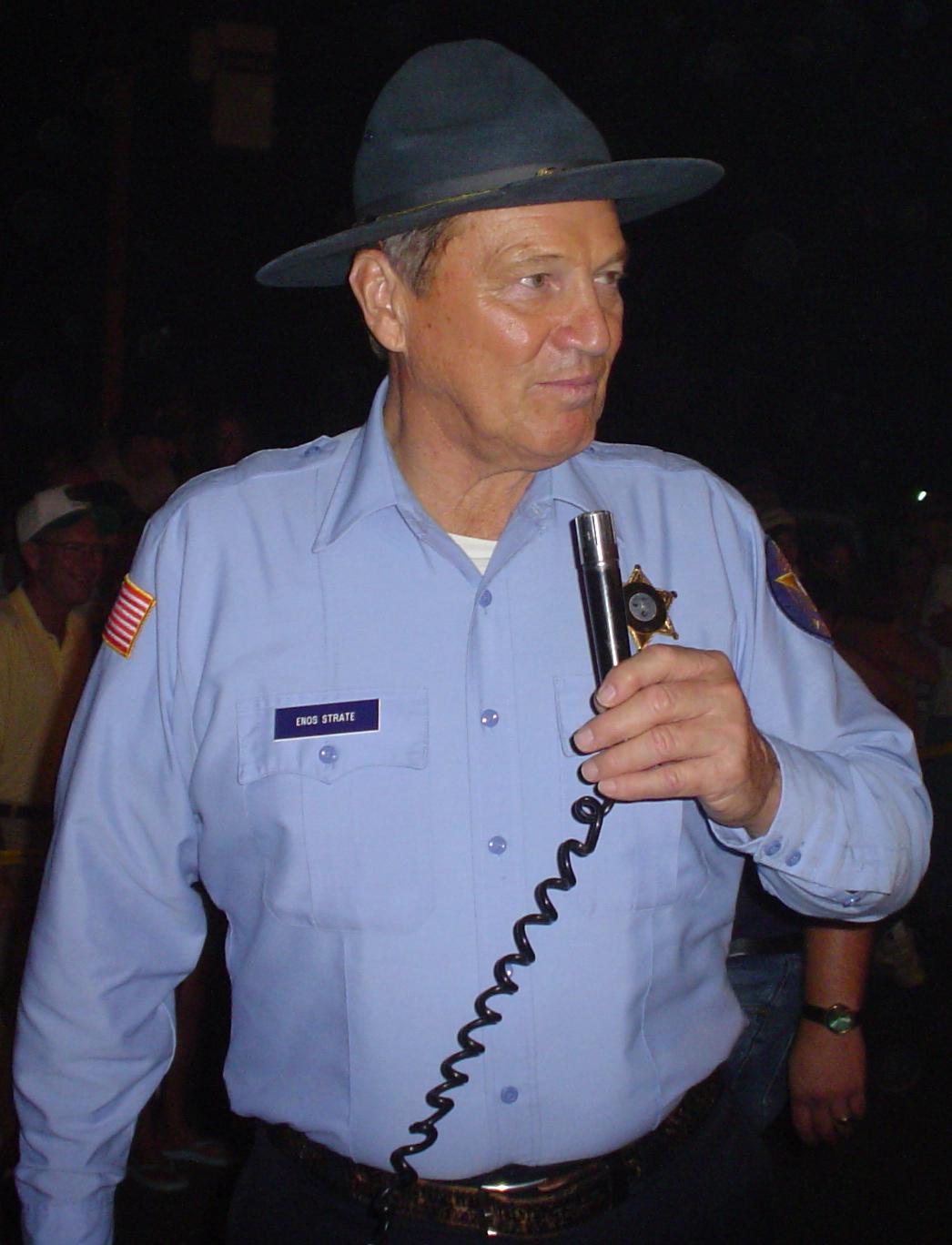
- Shroyer in 2005
- Born: Otis Burt Shroyer Jr. August 28, 1935 (age 91); Valdosta, Georgia, U.S.
- Occupation: Actor
- Years active: 1972–2023; 2026
- Spouse: Paula Shroyer
- Children: 2

Otis Burt "Sonny" Shroyer Jr. (born August 28, 1935) is an American retired actor who has appeared in various television and film roles. He is best known for his role as Deputy Sheriff Enos Strate in the television series The Dukes of Hazzard. He also starred in the short-lived spin-off series Enos based around his Dukes of Hazzard character.

== Early life, family and education ==
Shroyer was born in the town of Valdosta, Georgia. In high school, he was a football star. He attended Florida State University on a football scholarship, but his athletic career was cut short by an injury. He finished his degree at the University of Georgia.

== Career ==
Shroyer began his career as a professional model in 1961.

=== Acting ===
His first screen role came in the 1972 film Payday. Shroyer almost became typecast as a villain before landing the role of the naive Deputy Enos Strate in the hit pop culture series The Dukes of Hazzard in 1978 (first broadcast early 1979).

The Dukes of Hazzard role was Shroyer's most visible. His character was written out of that series at the beginning of its third season to star in a spinoff series, Enos, in 1980. The new show was not a success and was canceled after eighteen episodes, so Shroyer returned to The Dukes of Hazzard at the start of the fifth season in 1982 and remained with the series until it ended in 1985.

Shroyer portrayed University of Alabama coach Paul "Bear" Bryant in Forrest Gump, Delbert Birdsong in The Rainmaker, and Governor Jimmie Davis in Ray. Shroyer remained active until he retired in 2023 due to flu related issues.

In 2026, Shroyer made a rare public appearance at a Dukes of Hazzard fan event in Anderson, Alabama.

=== Singing ===
Shroyer also had a career as a country and gospel singer. He released a children's album in 1982, Back in Hazzard. It features a cover version of Roger Miller's classic, "You Can't Rollerskate in a Buffalo Herd". He also recorded a song "Children in Need" with fellow actor Randall Franks for Franks's 2001 CD God's Children. He and Franks have made personal appearances together.

== Personal life ==
Shroyer is married and has two sons. He is a Born Again Christian and sings Gospel Music.

== Filmography ==
- Payday (1972) – Dabney
- Sixteen (1973)
- The Longest Yard (1974) – Tannen
- Gator (1976) – 4th agent
- Movin’ On (1976) – Henchman (uncredited)
- The Farmer (1977) – Corrigan
- Roots (1977, TV mini-series) – Seaman Thompson (uncredited)
- Smokey and the Bandit (1977) – Motorcycle cop (uncredited)
- The Lincoln Conspiracy (1977) – Lewis Paine
- The Million Dollar Dixie Deliverance (1978, TV movie) – Luke
- King (1978, TV mini-series) – Police Officer preventing King from visiting an injured friend (uncredited)
- They Went That-A-Way & That-A-Way (1978) – Carlie
- The Dukes of Hazzard (1979–1980, 1982–1985, TV series) – Enos Strate
- The Devil and Max Devlin (1981) – Big Billy Hunniker
- Enos (1980–1981, TV series) – Enos Strate
- Alice (1983, TV series) "Mel Is Hog-Tied" – Deputy Enos Strate
- In the Heat of the Night (1990, TV series) – Emory Tanner
- Love Crimes (1992) – Plainclothes cop #1
- In The Heat of the Night (1993, TV series) – Dwight Foster
- Forrest Gump (1994) – Paul "Bear" Bryant
- Scattered Dreams (1993) - Sheriff of Santa Rosa County Florida
- American Gothic (1995–1998, TV series) – Gage Temple
- Bastard Out of Carolina (1996) – Sheriff
- The Dukes of Hazzard: Reunion! (1997, TV Movie) – Enos Strate
- Wild America (1997) – Bud
- The Rainmaker (1997) – Delbert Birdsong
- The Gingerbread Man (1998) – Chatham County Sheriff
- Freedom Song (2000, TV Movie) – Police Chief
- The Dukes of Hazzard: Hazzard in Hollywood (2000, TV Movie) – Enos Strate
- Diggity's Treasure (2001) – Otis Cane
- A Love Song for Bobby Long (2004) – Earl
- Ray (2004) – Gov. Jimmie Davis (uncredited)
- A Tale About Bootlegging (2005) – Sheriff Ed Cooper
- The Hole in Willie's Guitar (2005, Memarie music video) – Sheriff
- The Price (2008) – Ghost of Matthew Goldyn
- Opening Day (2009) – Ray Hampton
- The Way Home (2010) – Ed Walker
- Unconditional (2012) – Pauly
