= General Lee (car) =

Fictional car of the Dukes of Hazzard series

The General Lee
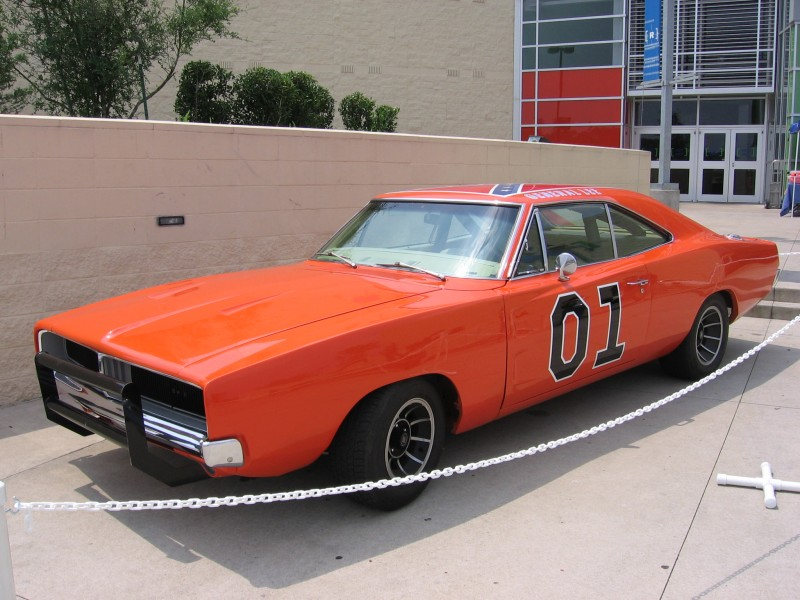
- The General Lee on public display in 2006

Overview
- Type: Dodge Charger
- Manufacturer: Chrysler (Dodge division)

Body and chassis
- Class: Muscle car
- Body style: 2-door coupé
- Layout: Front-engine, rear-wheel-drive
- Platform: Dodge Charger (B-body)

Powertrain
- Engine: 318 cu in (5.2 L) 2bbl B V8; 383 cu in (6.3 L) 4bbl B V8; 440 cu in (7.2L) 4bbl V8
- Transmission: 3-speed TorqueFlite automatic

The General Lee (sometimes referred to as simply "the General") is an orange 1969 Dodge Charger driven in the television series The Dukes of Hazzard by Bo and Luke Duke and, in season 5, cousins Coy and Vance. It is known for its signature horn, its police chases, stunts—especially its long jumps—and for having its doors welded shut, requiring the Dukes to climb in and out through the windows. The car appears in every episode but one ("Mary Kaye's Baby"). The car's namesake is Robert E. Lee, general of the Confederate States Army during the American Civil War. It bears a Confederate battle flag on its roof. Its horn plays the first 12 notes of the song "Dixie".

The idea for the General Lee was developed from the bootlegger Jerry Rushing's car, which was named for Lee's favorite horse, Traveller. Traveller was also the name of the car in Moonrunners, the 1975 movie precursor to The Dukes of Hazzard.

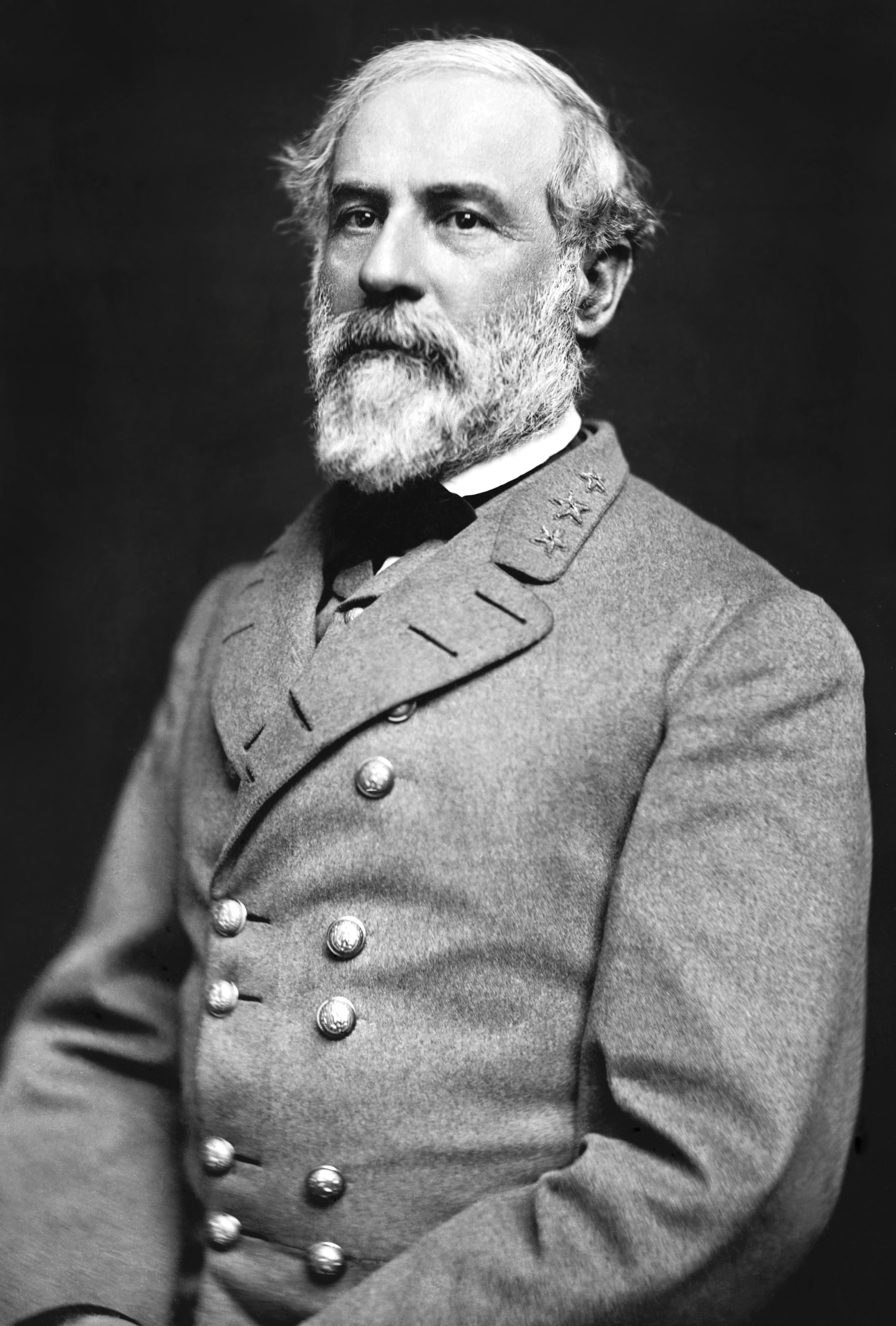
The General Lee was named after the Confederate general Robert E. Lee.

== History ==
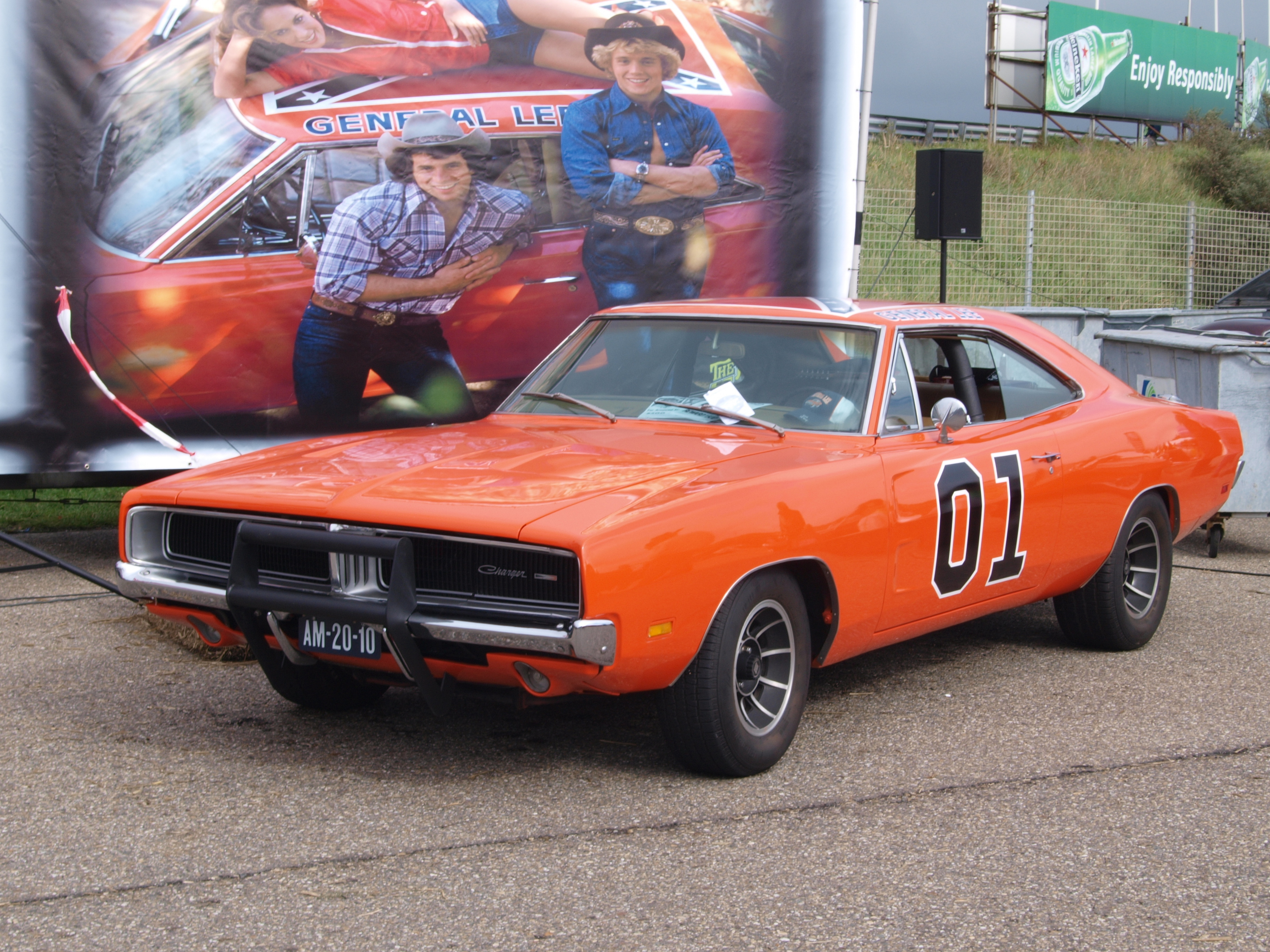
A General Lee pictured at the National Oldtimer Festival Zandvoort 2010, The Netherlands

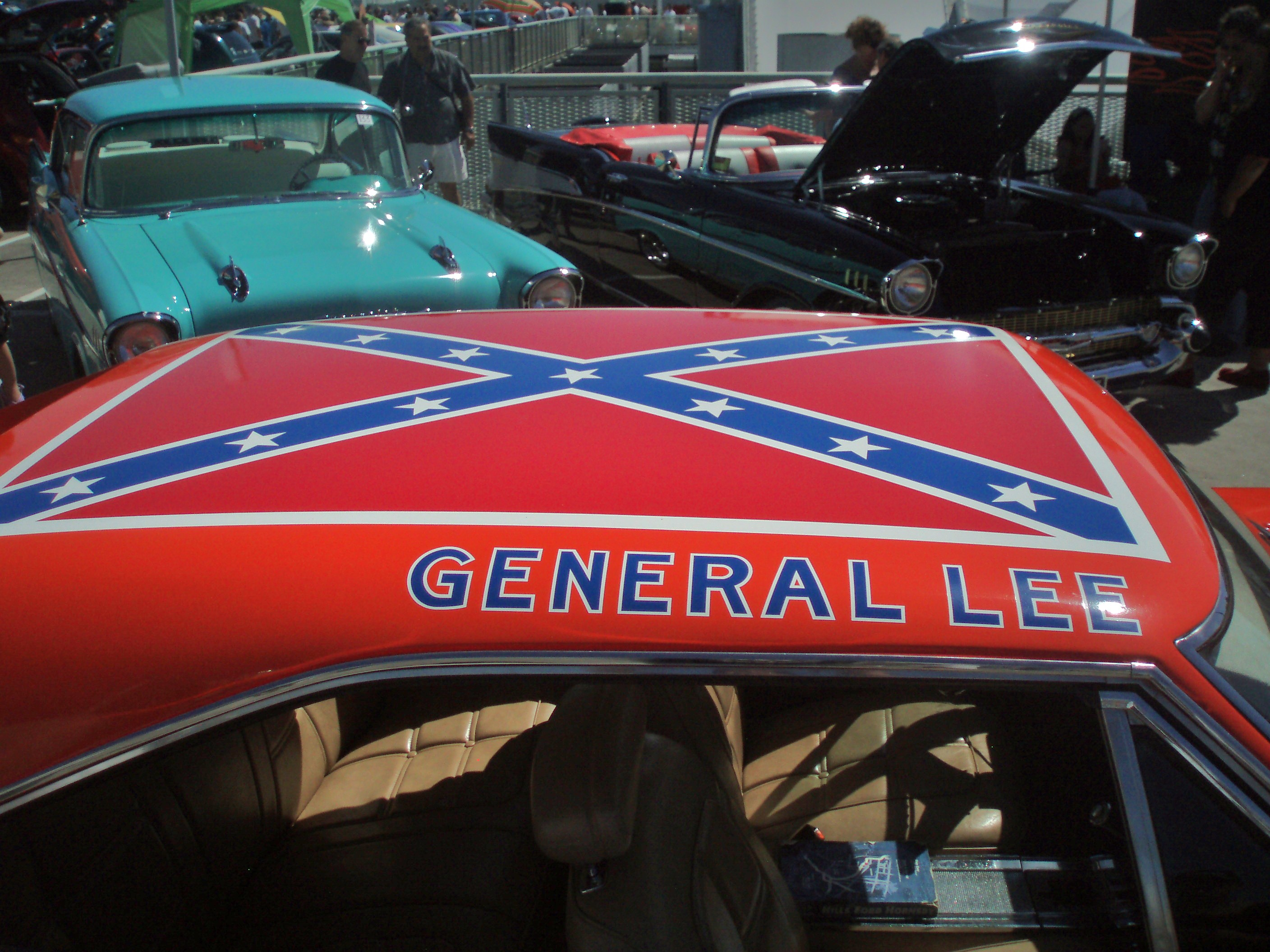
The Confederate battle flag painted on the roof

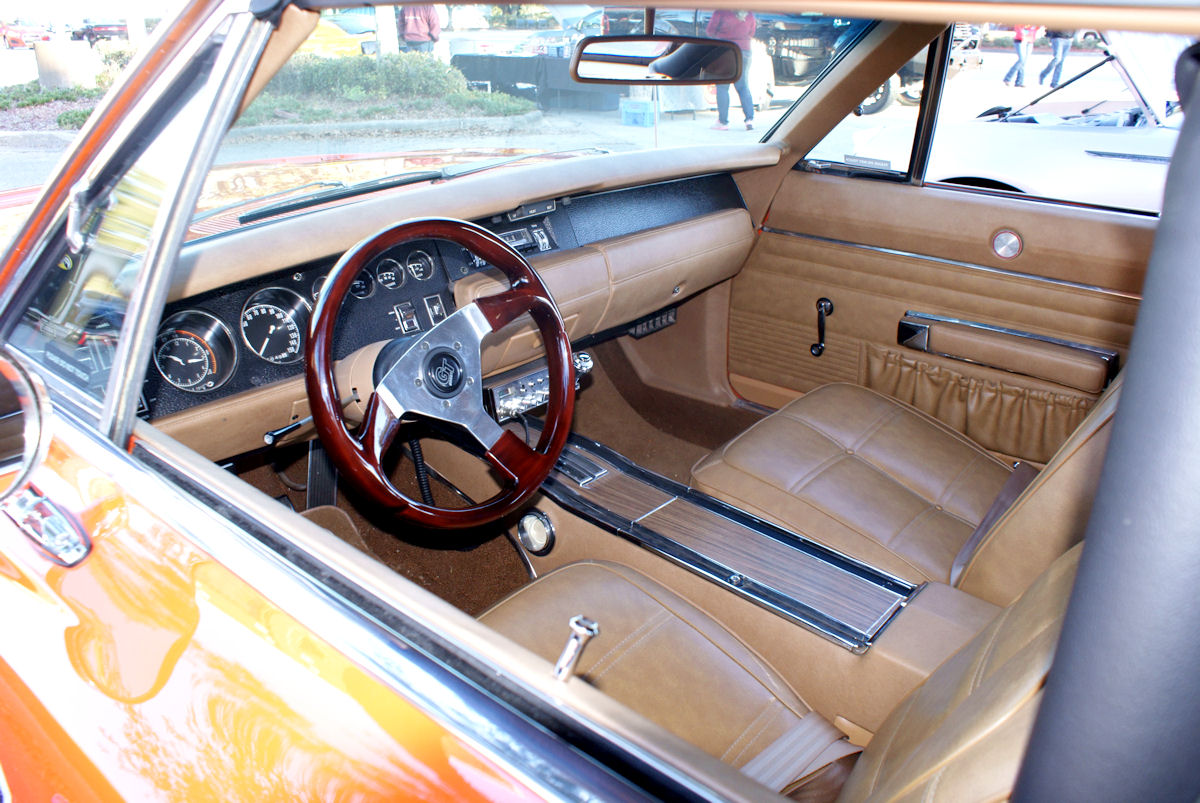
General Lee's dashboard and interior from the 2005 movie.

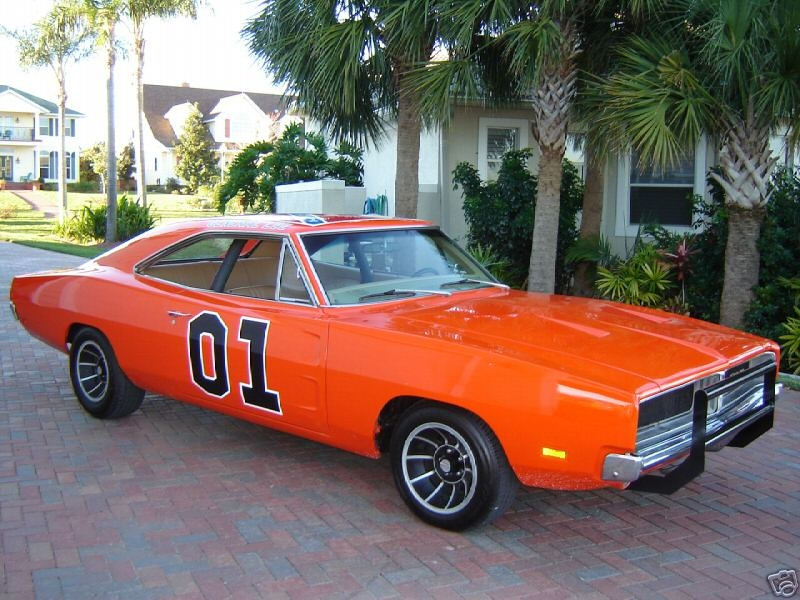
The General Lee photographed in 2006

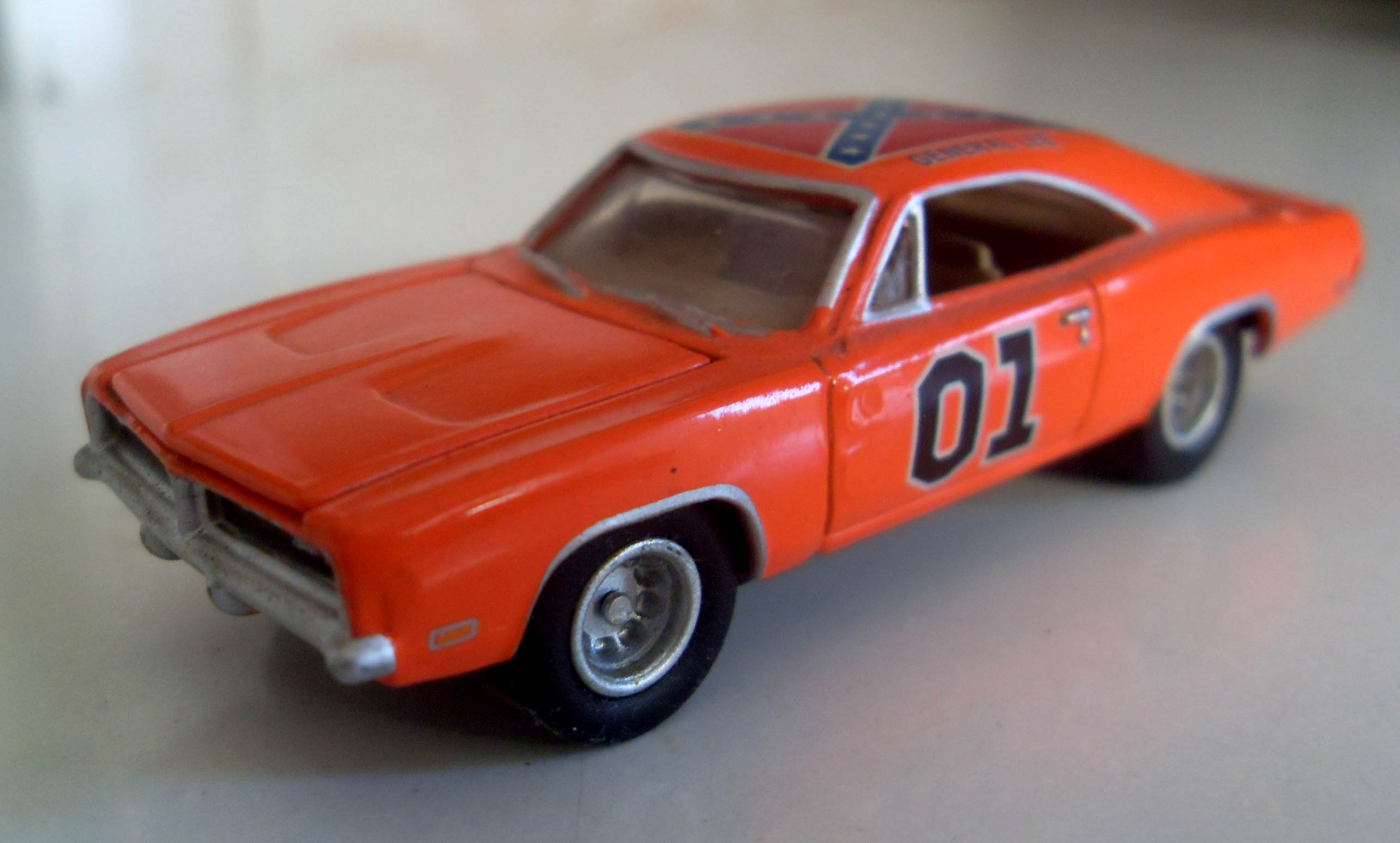
General Lee model car by Playing Mantis' Johnny Lightning

Series creator Gy Waldron first considered a Pontiac Firebird for the "part" of the General Lee, but deferred to stunt coordinator Al Wyatt, Sr. to choose a car that could withstand the rigors of the stunts. Wyatt knew the driving and stunt capabilities of the 1969 Dodge Charger because he had used three of them for the stunt work in the 1974 film Dirty Mary, Crazy Larry. Many of the stunts in The Dukes of Hazzard were similar in nature, aside from the long-distance jumps, so he chose the Charger for the show.

Stunts on the The Dukes of Hazzard often required substantial modification to the cars. When filming a jump, anywhere from 500 to 1,000 pounds (230 to 450 kg) of sand bags or concrete ballast was placed in the trunk to prevent the car from nosing over and landing on the front bumper. The mechanics eventually decided to raise the front end of the car—by adjusting the torsion bars to maximum height—to keep the front lower valence from scraping against the ramp on the jump and causing it to lose speed. Stunt drivers report enjoying the flights, some of which were more than 40 feet in the air, but hating the landings. Despite the ballast, the landing attitude of the car was usually unpredictable, resulting in moderate to extremely violent landings nose-down or on all four wheels, and high g forces on the driver. On most landings, the car's unibody construction failed catastrophically. This required post-production editing to eliminate the damage onscreen as much as possible. All cars used in large jumps were immediately retired due to structural damage. On average, more than one General Lee was discarded per show.

Estimates vary of the total number of General Lees used over the course of the series. Former cast member Ben Jones ("Cooter" in the show) and builders involved with the show have put the number at 325, but others say about 255. About 17 originals still exist, in various states of repair. Chargers from model years 1968 and 1969 (no 1970s were used until the 2005 film) were obtained and converted to General Lee specifications (taillights, grilles, etc.). Builders have said obtaining the cars was not a problem until later years. By that time, the car was the star of the show and Warner Bros. (WB) moved building of the cars in-house to keep the cars consistent in appearance. Later in the show's run, when it got too hard or expensive to continue procuring more Chargers in Southern California, the producers started using more "jump footage" from previous episodes. In the final season, radio-controlled miniatures were occasionally used, to the chagrin of several cast members.

Episodes 1 through 5 were filmed in the Georgia towns of Covington and Conyers in November and December 1978. Georgia episode cars consisted of five Dodge Chargers. The first General Lees were built by Warner Bros. and shipped to Georgia, where John Marendi (picture car coordinator) labeled the first three cars as "LEE 1", "LEE 2", and "LEE 3" (in no particular order) for film editing purposes.

LEE 1 was a second unit car with a full roll cage. It is a 383 V8-powered 1969 Charger equipped with air conditioning, an AM/FM stereo, power steering, and power drum brakes. It was originally painted in code T3 "Light Bronze Metallic" with a tan interior, a black vinyl top and chrome rocker trim that was left on due to previously poor body work on the left quarter panel. In addition, the gas cap trim and wheel well trim were missing, so the corresponding trims were removed on LEE 2 and 3 to match. The chrome vinyl top trim was supposed to be removed, but since the left quarter panel had been replaced and was very poorly installed the trim had to be left on to hide the body work. As a result, most General Lees throughout the series had vinyl top trim. After the now-famous jump over Rosco P. Coltrane's police cruiser by stuntman Craig Baxley, it was stripped of its front seats and 1969-specific grille and taillight panel. LEE 1 was used once more as the "Richard Petty" tire test car in the fourth episode "Repo Men".

LEE 2, like LEE 1, was a second unit car with a full roll cage, a 383 V-8, a floor shifted automatic transmission and A/C. Originally painted B5 Blue with a black interior, the interior was repainted tan to match LEE 1 and 3 though its steering wheel remained black. It was used for the opening scene in "One Armed Bandits". In this scene, Bo and Luke were chasing Rosco's police cruiser with the General after Cooter stole it.

LEE 3 was the first unit 1 close-up car and the first General Lee built by Warner Brothers and is seen in the first publicity photos. It was originally an F5 Medium Green Metallic R/T SE (Special Edition) model with a tan vinyl top. It was powered by a 440 Magnum engine with 375 HP and weighed 3,671-pound (1,665 kg). LEE 3 was equipped with A/C, power windows, a wood grain dash, and an AM radio. It also had a factory tachometer (which can be seen on "Repo Men"). This car had a tan leather interior and a removable roll bar that allowed installation of a camera for in-car shots. LEE 3 was painted 1975 Corvette Flame Red with a special base coat; the base coat was used after they found LEE 1's paint appeared to be blotchy due to the direct application over factory paint (they had first been painted Chrysler code EV2 or "Hemi Orange"). Eventually, the first three General Lees showed visible damage, so the crew had to start making more. The first General Lee built in Georgia was a 1968 Charger converted to look like a 1969 with the tail light panel, front grille, and front seats borrowed from LEE 1. Interiors not originally tan were sprayed with SEM brand "Saddle tan" vinyl dye. The first three Georgia Lees had a set of crossed flags (a Confederate flag and checkered flag) on the panel between the rear window and trunk lid. Although four sets were created, only three were used. They were discontinued due to the continuity of the General Lee graphics, making it one less thing to be used. The three surviving cars went back to California and had the crossed flags removed upon reconditioning. The wheels were generally 14-by-7-inch (36 cm × 18 cm) American Racing brand "Vectors" throughout the show (with Carroll Shelby center caps) and were mainly mounted on P235/70R14 B. F. Goodrich Radial T/A tires with the blackwall side facing out.

LEE 1 was sold to professional golfer Bubba Watson at the 2012 Barrett-Jackson Scottsdale auction for US$110,000 (US$121,000 after buyer premium). After he won the 2012 Masters tournament, there was controversy about his using the General in his Twitter header image. In 2015, in the midst of the Confederate flag controversial ban, he declared his intention of repainting the car and removing the flag. In 2020 Watson confirmed he had removed the flag.

=== The Veluzat era ===
Andre and Renaud Veluzat built General Lees for WB from the second season into the fourth season. Viewers can also see two "Georgia" cars used often up into the early second season. LEE 3 and a specially caged car never appearing (but built) in Georgia were used heavily in early California episodes. The Veluzats were somewhat inconsistent in how they built the cars, so this is when the most variations from specification are found. The paint was any color orange they had on hand at the time, but there does appear to be some variance here: interiors were mostly dyed brown and occasionally SEM Saddle Tan. According to some sources, the Veluzats charged WB $250 a week per car for rental and a lump sum of $2000 to $3000 upon destruction of the vehicles; this included police cars. WB mechanics had to maintain the cars at company expense.

The money generated by building General Lees financed the Veluzat family project of restoring Gene Autry's Melody Ranch; it had burned in the 1960s. This ranch is where many classic Western films were shot, as well as the television series Gunsmoke. Today, it is a fully functional movie ranch where shows such as HBO's Deadwood are filmed.

=== The Warner Brothers era ===
By 1983, Warner Brothers turned total control of building General Lees to Ken Fritz. Fritz didn't have the job long before he too was fired, and at this point Warner Brothers moved full production in-house. The General Lee was now the highlight of the series, and WB received enormous amounts of Lee-specific fan mail that nit-picked the inconsistencies of the cars. Because of the fame of General Lee, WB had their staff mechanics build the cars to a specific appearance, even underneath, since the dual exhausts and undercarriage of all stunt cars would be seen during jumps. All graphics had to meet specifications, all side markers were removed for consistency, allowing '68-bodied Chargers (with small round circular side markers, versus the larger '69 markers) to be used; and roll bars and push bars had to meet an exact specification. However, some changes were made before the specifications were laid out: The push bar became wider, the interior became a light beige color, and the roll bars were covered in black foam padding. During this period, the only way to distinguish the 1968 conversions from the 1969 originals is by the shape of the dashboard padding.

As the WB era rolled on, finding the cars became difficult: Piper Cubs were hired to perform aerial searches for 1968 and 1969 Chargers amongst the populace; the jumped cars were now no longer scrapped after one jump if deemed salvageable, and were repaired and used until they could no longer function; and, as last resort, miniature radio-controlled models were also brought in toward the end of the series to replace most of the big jump stunts, thereby saving more cars—something that proved unpopular with many episode directors (including Tom Wopat), who felt that the models did not look realistic. By this time, there was also a rivalry for "TV's greatest car" with the Knight Rider series, leading to the models being used more and more for greater jumps to try to outdo that series. Taking full control also saved some money, as now WB had the ability to buy cars, recondition them, and use them without paying daily rental fees.

=== The General Lee from The Dukes of Hazzard feature film ===
At the beginning of the movie, the General was a faded orange with a hand-painted "01" on the doors, black steel wheels, standard front bumper, functioning doors, and no Confederate Flag. Midway through the film, Cooter repairs the General after it is vandalized by Boss Hogg's hirelings. He repaints it a bright Hemi orange and adds the well-known trademarks (American Racing "Vector" 10-spoke "turbine" wheels, octagonal "01", black grille guard, Confederate flag on the roof, "Dixie" horn, and "General Lee" above the door window openings).

The movie General not only flies and makes controlled landings, but also drifts with the aid of professional drifter Tanner Foust. During jump scenes, some stunt cars were propelled under their own power by stunt drivers; others had their engines and transmissions removed. The engineless Chargers were then launched without drivers by a diesel-driven catapult similar in principle to those used on aircraft carriers. Approximately 24 1968 to 1970 Chargers were used in the film.

Unlike the television-show-era Lees, the movie cars used aftermarket graphic kits. The movie gave them new credibility and is no longer considered to be an inaccurate choice. Otherwise, except for the white letters on the Goodrich "Radial T/A" tires, the exterior of the movie's close-up General Lees varied little from the television show cars. The paint was "Big Bad Orange" (an American Motors Corporation color) rather than Corvette "Flame Red"; the interior headliner was black instead of tan, an actual roll cage was used; a three-spoke Grant wood-trimmed steering wheel replaced the standard wheel, an AM/FM stereo radio with Compact Disc player was installed in the dashboard; and the interiors were a custom color vinyl fabric made to look like the dye/paint used in the later eras of the TV show. One still can differentiate the 1968 Chargers by looking at the dash pad, but now 1970 Chargers were thrown in the mix. The cars somewhat resembled a late 1990s to early 2000s (decade) General Lee clone, but the overall flavor of the General Lee is still obvious. On all of the cars, the back-up lights and side marker lenses were removed, the openings filled in.

Eleven of the cars used for the movie had been purchased from the Luedtke Auto Group. Many of the cars had been cut up to allow for inside camera views.

General Lee number 020 was the drift car used in the drifting scene around Lee Circle and was also the car racing the black Shelby at the end of the movie. It was the only 4-speed-equipped car and was the backup to car #005. The car contains an emergency brake handle near the shifter that allowed the stunt driver quick access to locking the rear brakes at will. Though it did sustain some damage during filming, it is fully road worthy and is privately owned by Troy Martinson in Minnesota.

Two of the General Lees (a 1969 R/T SE and a 1970 made to appear as a 1969) were temporarily sold to Warner Brothers by Everett "J.R." Barton of Wichita, Kansas, for $1.00 each then sold back to him for $1.25. They were picked up from him in Wichita and were transported to Baton Rouge, both in driving condition. The 1970 (made to 1969) car then had the engine removed, got the General Lee treatment then weight added to balance the car for the main Freeway jump. One other car was used before this car. The first one landed hard on its nose, broke, and careened right into the guardrail. Given its problematic landing it was not used for that scene. Mr. Barton's car, number 127, was then used for that scene. It was launched from a catapult system, much like that used on aircraft carriers. It flew the farthest of all the jumps in the film and truly did survive. This is the car that made that jump in the film. After the filming the cars were returned to Everett. Everett then put a motor back in the car and even in its jumped condition had driven it in a couple of parades. After keeping the car for eight years, he sold it to an individual that had it restored to show quality. It was restored by the men on the TV show Graveyard Cars in season 7.

=== Smallville homage ===
Early in the fifth-season episode "Exposed" of the television series Smallville, former Dukes of Hazzard co-star Tom Wopat (Luke Duke) plays Kansas Senator Jack Jennings (which in itself is a Dukes tribute to Waylon Jennings), old friend of Jonathan Kent, played by John Schneider (Bo Duke). Jennings fishtails his car into the Kent farmyard. The car is a 1968 Dodge Charger R/T that resembles the original condition of Lee 2, painted blue and lacking the General Lee's distinctive insignia.

=== General Lee TV commercials ===
In 2014 the General Lee was featured in a commercial spot for AutoTrader. The commercial featured the General Lee with Dukes of Hazzard stars John Schneider and Tom Wopat. The series' theme song, "Good Ole Boys", can be heard playing during the commercial. The video was released on June 6, 2014.

=== Use of the Confederate battle flag ===
In 2015, after a white supremacist shot and killed several Black churchgoers in Charleston, South Carolina, there was a backlash against the Confederate battle flag due to the flag's historical associations with slavery. In response, Warner Bros. Entertainment, Inc. halted production of General Lee toy cars. Ben Jones criticized the move, stating, "I think all of Hazzard Nation understands that the Confederate battle flag is the symbol that represents the indomitable spirit of independence which keeps us 'makin' our way the only way we know how.'" John Schneider responded by stating, "I take exception to those who say that the flag on the General Lee should always be considered a symbol of racism. Is the flag used as such in other applications? Yes, but certainly not on the Dukes."

In 2001, the hip-hop group Juggaknots's album Clear Blue Skies included the song "Generally" about the imagery of the car. Singer Breezly Brewin' discussed the lyrics in "Suitable for Children," an episode of This American Life.

After Bubba Watson, owner of LEE 1, won the 2012 Masters tournament, there were complaints about his using the General in his Twitter header image. On July 2, 2015, Watson tweeted that he would be painting over the Confederate battle flag on the car's roof. This prompted Brian Grams, director of the Volo Auto Museum (which already had another General Lee), to offer to purchase Watson's General Lee, citing how Watson's car was significant because it was used in the show's first season and would be worthy of inclusion in the museum's collection. His offer was turned down. Watson confirmed in 2020 he still owned the car and that he had removed the flag.

After demands in 2020 for removal of Confederate symbols, the Volo Museum refused to remove the car they had owned since 2005, another one used during the first season. Grams said no one had complained to the museum.

== Engines ==
Engines in the TV show General Lees varied; they used 318, 383, and 440-cubic-inch engines. None of the TV series cars had the 426 Hemi, although in the 2005 The Dukes of Hazzard motion picture, Cooter replaced the General's original engine with a Chrysler 426 Hemi engine. However, the close-up Lees (except for the first one) were 383-powered. The special purpose-built "Ski Car" (the car that was used for stunts involving driving on the left side or right side wheels with the opposite side wheels in the air) had a 318, as it was lighter weight. Most of the "workhorse" stunt cars had 383s and 440s. The stunt drivers tended to prefer 440s (a higher performance engine) for jumps, so 440-powered stunt Lees were often saved for the higher and longer jumps. Also, though early sound effects led many people to believe otherwise, only a handful of Chargers had manual transmissions; most had 727 TorqueFlite automatic transmissions.

== Exit and entry ==
The General Lee, except in the beginning of the movie, does not have opening doors. In the TV series, it is explained that racing cars have their doors welded shut, so the driver and passenger must slide in the window (as in NASCAR). This was often used for comedic effect when Uncle Jesse or Boss Hogg required help to squeeze through the window. In one episode, Sheriff Rosco hires a bounty hunter (Jason Steele in the show) to create a fake General Lee and trick the Dukes into driving it, at which point he promptly orders their arrest for auto theft. The fake car was easily identified because its doors opened. This limitation was not at first planned, but while filming the first chase (where Bo and Luke are chasing Cooter in Rosco's car), the passenger's door handle was damaged when it hit the mailboxes and could not be opened from the outside, so Tom Wopat (Luke) climbed though the window. The director loved the move so much, he had John Schneider (Bo) climb in, too. This is why only LEE 1 and 2 had full roll cages and all other General Lees had only a roll bar, which made it easier for the actors to get in and out. In the movie, the car has been repaired after being trashed, but the doors could not be fixed fast enough. For a running entry, Bo and Luke also slide over the hood rather than walk around the front of the car. However, in the prequel The Dukes of Hazzard: The Beginning, the left door was welded shut while the right one was not.

== Exhaust systems ==
Exhaust systems were basic: some had glasspack mufflers, but most had standard exhausts with the pipe cut just before the rear end. The exhaust sound that can be heard on most of the California-era episode General Lees is from a Thrush brand glasspack. The sounds came from the exhaust systems fitted to the close-up cars; the parts used were Blackjack brand headers, dual exhausts, and the aforementioned Thrush mufflers. The sounds were dubbed in after the scene was filmed. According to Schneider, the General Lee's exhaust sounds were the same sound effects from the movie Bullitt.

== Tires ==
Tires used on the General Lee varied, but the best known make and model was the B.F. Goodrich Radial T/A. The most common size was P235/70R14; P235/70R15 was also used. Winston Winners were also used.
