= Luke Duke =

- The Dukes of Hazzard character
- Tom Wopat as Luke Duke in The Dukes of Hazzard
- First appearance: "One Armed Bandits", first episode of The Dukes of Hazzard
- Portrayed by: Tom Wopat - 1979; Johnny Knoxville - 2005; Randy Wayne - 2007

In-universe information
- Gender: Male
- Occupation: U.S. Marine Corps Drill Instructor/Sergeant and Former NASCAR Driver
- Significant other: Katie-Lynn Johnson (In the 2005 Movie)
- Relatives: Daisy Duke (cousin); Bo Duke (cousin); Coy Duke (cousin); Vance Duke (cousin); Jesse Duke (uncle); Jud Duke (brother); Hank Duke (great-grandfather); Joe Duke (great-grandfather); Dixie Duke (great-grandmother)
- Religion: Christian
- Nationality: American

Lucas K. Duke is a fictional character in The Dukes of Hazzard, and the main protagonist in the show, an American comedy television series which ran from 1979 to 1985. Played by Tom Wopat in the original TV series, Luke is the main protagonist of the show. He is the dark-haired, older cousin to the character Bo Duke. He is often the one who comes up with plans to get the Duke family out of trouble. He performs more of the physical stunts (such as climbing from one moving car to another), while his cousin Bo does most of the driving. Both Duke boys are known for their signature "hood slide" across the General Lee, their 1969 Dodge Charger. (Luke was the first to perform this stunt on the show) Luke acted hypocritically on occasion, most prominently in season 1 episode 6 "Swamp Molly".

Luke Duke was later played by Johnny Knoxville in the poorly-received cinematic version. Actor Randy Wayne played Luke in the prequel television film, The Dukes of Hazzard: The Beginning.

== Casting ==
In 1978, actor Tom Wopat auditioned for the part of Luke Duke, the last role to be cast. He was invited to read for the part after a CBS casting agent remembered seeing him in an off-Broadway musical, A Bistro Car on the CNR. Filming began in Georgia ten days later.

== Character background ==
Show creator Gy Waldron named the Dukes after an elderly man he worked with in a hardware store. He chose the first name Luke, in part because he wanted at least two of the names to be Biblical in origin.

A veteran of the United States Marine Corps, the character Luke Duke is a former boxer.

Luke and his younger cousin Bo Duke live in an unincorporated area of the fictional Hazzard County, in Georgia. Luke and Bo own a 1969 Dodge Charger, nicknamed The General Lee, which is painted orange, with the Confederate Flag on top, and 01 painted on the sides. Luke and Bo evade the corrupt politicians of Hazzard County, such as Boss Hogg, Sheriff Rosco P. Coltrane, and the sheriff's deputies.

The Duke family, including cousin Daisy Duke and Uncle Jesse Duke, was well known for their role in the moonshine business among other interests. Bo and Luke had both been sentenced to probation for illegal transportation of moonshine. As a result, neither was permitted to use firearms, instead preferring to use bow and arrows. The terms of Bo and Luke's probation included staying within the boundaries of Hazzard County (unless given special permission by their Probation Officer, who happened to be Boss Hogg). Prior to the start of the show, Luke served in the U.S. Marine Corps, rising to the rank of Sergeant.

=== Hood slide ===
Luke's famous "hood slide" (as seen in the opening credits, originating from the second episode, "Daisy's Song") is the trick most commonly associated with the character.

The hood slide's origins were accidental. Wopat got caught while trying to vault over the car to get to the passenger side. His foot got caught on the side of the car, and he cut his thigh on the radio aerial, which was later removed to prevent injury.

== Storylines ==
In the pilot episode of the series, Bo commented that Luke was probably the father of at least two of the children who live at the Hazzard County Orphanage.

Luke later left Hazzard County, along with his cousin Bo, to join the NASCAR circuit. His cousin Vance replaced him during that time.

According to the 1997 film The Dukes of Hazzard: Reunion!, Luke eventually would leave Hazzard for good, and put his military training to good use by becoming a fire jumper for the U.S. Forest Service. During training in Montana, he met and fell in love with a woman named Anita Blackwell, who was a talented singer. He convinced her to leave to pursue her dreams, and she became a successful country music star. Luke met her again in The Dukes of Hazzard: Hazzard in Hollywood, although by then she was married to another man.

== Merchandise ==
In the 1980s, Luke Duke action figures were released by Mego, along with dolls of Bo, Daisy, and Boss Hogg.
