= Tom Wopat =

American actor and singer

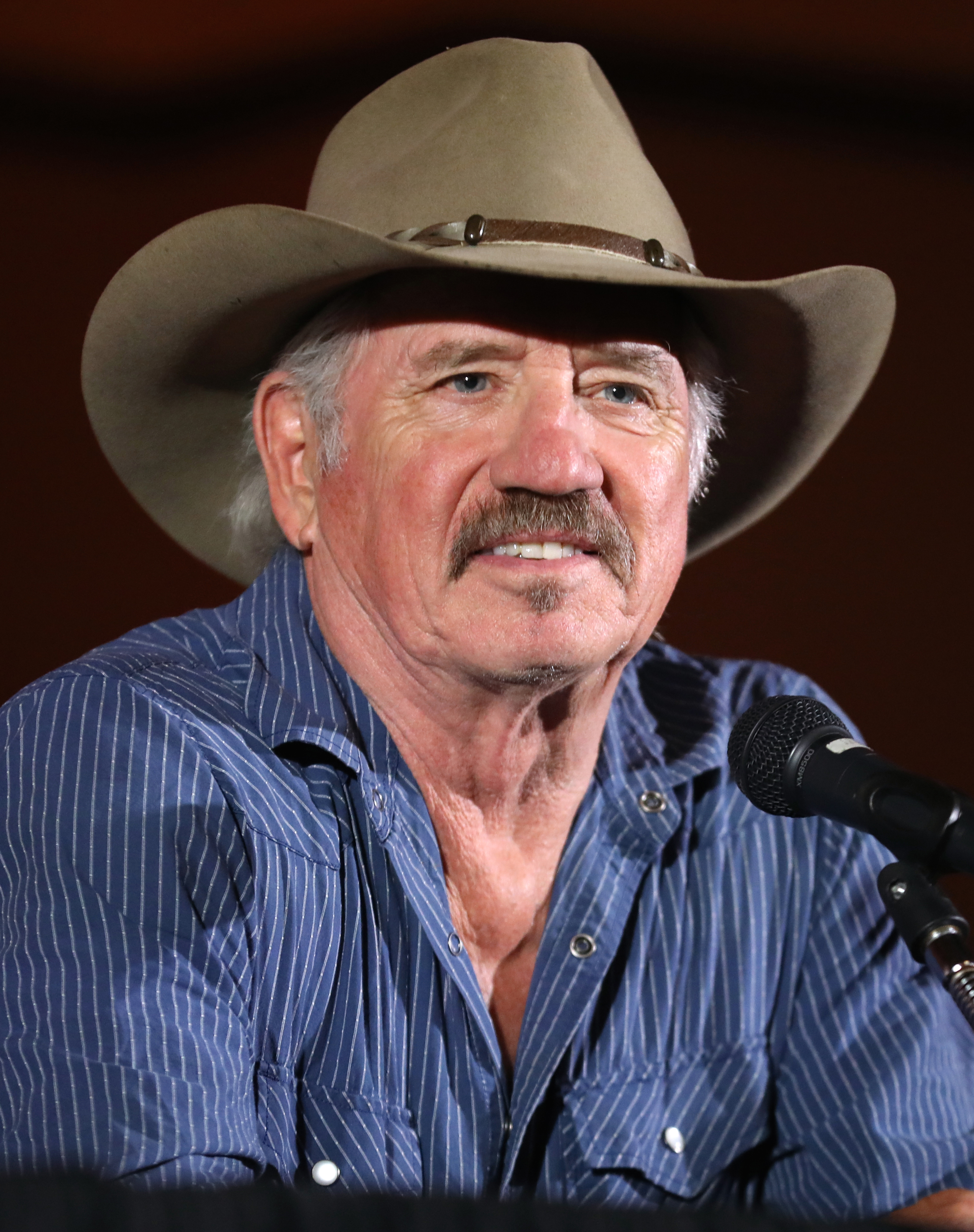
- Wopat in 2024
- Born: Thomas Steven Wopat; September 9, 1951 (age 75); Lodi, Wisconsin, U.S.
- Occupations: Actor, singer
- Years active: 1977–present
- Known for: Lucas K. "Luke" Duke in The Dukes of Hazzard
- Spouse(s): Vickie Allen (divorced); Kirsten S. Larvick
- Children: 5
- Musical career
- Genre: Country
- Instrument: Vocals
- Labels: Columbia, EMI, Capitol, Epic

Thomas Steven Wopat (born September 9, 1951) is an American actor and singer. He first achieved fame as Lucas K. "Luke" Duke on the long-running television action/comedy series The Dukes of Hazzard. Since then, Wopat has worked regularly, most often on the stage in musicals and in supporting television and movie roles. He was a semi-regular recurring character on the 1990s comedy series Cybill, and he had a small role as U.S. Marshal Gil Tatum in Django Unchained (2012). Wopat also has a recurring role as Sheriff Jim Wilkins on the television series Longmire. Additionally, Wopat has recorded several albums of country songs and pop standards, scoring a series of moderately successful singles in the 1980s and 1990s.

== Biography ==
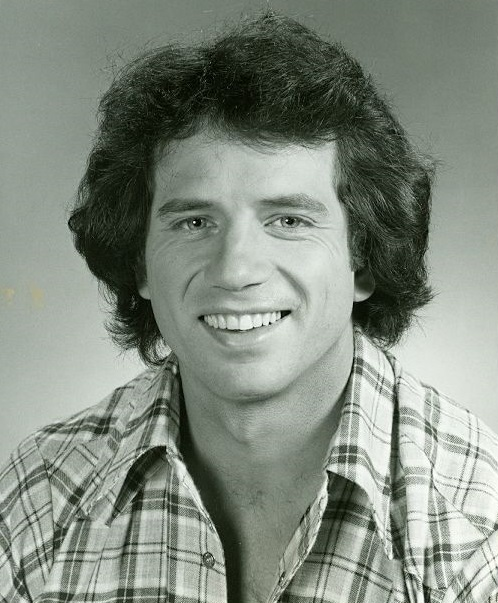
Wopat in 1979

Wopat was born in Lodi, Wisconsin, the fifth of eight children born to Albin and Ruth Wopat. His father was a dairy farmer of Polish descent. He was raised a devout Catholic.

Wopat attended the University of Wisconsin–Madison and made his television debut on One Life to Live. He credits UW-Madison Lighting Design teacher Gilbert Vaughn Hemsley Jr. with advancing his early performing career. He achieved fame on the television series The Dukes of Hazzard (1979–85), then embarked on a music career. He has recorded eleven albums. Musically, he switches between rock and roll and country music styles, though two recent albums have been of classic pop standards. His 1980s albums were on EMI Nashville. A 2005 recording, Dissertation on the State of Bliss, is a collection of Harold Arlen songs. Wopat first appeared on the Broadway stage as a replacement in the 1977 musical I Love My Wife, as Wally. He later appeared as a replacement in the stage musicals City of Angels and Guys and Dolls (as Sky Masterson in 1992–93).

In 1981, he played the main character, Billy Bigelow, in the musical Carousel, at the Barn Theatre in Augusta, Michigan. He later reprised the role at the Kennedy Center in 1986. He appeared in the opening cast of the 1999 revival of Annie Get Your Gun as Frank Butler, opposite Bernadette Peters, Cheryl Ladd, Susan Lucci, and Crystal Bernard, who played Annie Oakley (in consecutive order); he was nominated for a Tony Award in 1999 for his performance as Butler. He later appeared in revivals of Chicago (as Billy Flynn in 2004–05, 2007 and 2008–09) and 42nd Street.

In 2005, Wopat appeared in the Broadway revival of David Mamet's Pulitzer Prize–winning play Glengarry Glen Ross as James Lingk. He starred in the North Carolina Theatre's production of The Music Man as Harold Hill in November 2006.

In 2008, Wopat starred on Broadway as the father of the bride-to-be in A Catered Affair, written by Harvey Fierstein (book) and John Bucchino (score), which opened on April 17, 2008, at the Walter Kerr Theatre. He received his second Tony nomination for that performance.

In July 2009, he originated the role of Frank Abagnale Sr. in the musical Catch Me If You Can (based on the film of the same name) in July and August 2009 at Seattle's 5th Avenue Theatre.

He was featured in the new musical revue Sondheim on Sondheim, conceived and directed by James Lapine, presenting the life and works of Stephen Sondheim. The revue premiered on Broadway at the Roundabout Theatre's Studio 54 on March 19, 2010, in previews and closed on June 27. He portrayed Ryan Hutton in the musical Lovestruck.

== Personal life ==
=== Marriages ===
Wopat was first married to Vickie Allen. Later he married Kirsten S. Larvick, a filmmaker and audiovisual archivist.

=== Legal troubles ===
Wopat was arrested on March 15, 2006, in northern New Jersey, charged with driving while intoxicated and reckless driving.

Wopat was arrested on August 2, 2017, on indecent assault and battery (felony) and drug (misdemeanor) charges in Waltham, Massachusetts, where he was about to open in a production of 42nd Street at Reagle Music Theater of Greater Boston. The Boston Globe reported "According to a Waltham police report, Wopat allegedly assaulted the woman during a rehearsal at the high school on July 23. The accuser said he came up behind her and grabbed her buttocks and continued touching her in that area. The show's producer and manager had previously spoken to Wopat regarding complaints from other female cast members about inappropriate comments and touching, the report said. The artistic director told police he had spoken with Wopat three times, and the actor was also reprimanded for being intoxicated at rehearsal, authorities said."

During his arrest by Waltham police on August 2, 2017, a search of him and his vehicle under warrant revealed "two bags of white powder believed to be cocaine." According to court documents, Wopat told police that he buys cocaine "in large quantities and uses it over time". Wopat pleaded not guilty at his arraignment on August 3, 2017, and was released on bail.

On July 20, 2018, Wopat pleaded guilty to two counts of "annoying and accosting a person of the opposite sex" and was sentenced to one year of probation.

== Filmography ==
Year	Title	Role	Notes
1979–85	The Dukes of Hazzard	Luke Duke	128 episodes
1980	Fantasy Island	David Chilton	Episode: "Flying Aces/The Mermaid Returns"
1983	The Dukes	Luke Duke (voice)	7 episodes
1984	Story, Songs and Stars		Television movie
1984	Burning Rage	Tom Silver	Television movie
1987	Christmas Comes to Willow Creek	Pete	Television movie
1988	Blue Skies	Frank Cobb	8 episodes
1989	A Peaceable Kingdom	Dr. Jed McFadden	12 episodes
1992	Just My Imagination	Bobby Rex	Television movie
1995–1998	Cybill	Jeff Robbins	22 episodes Nominated — Screen Actors Guild Award for Outstanding Performance by an Ensemble in a Comedy Series (shared with Christine Baranski, Dedee Pfeiffer, Alan Rosenberg, Cybill Shepherd and Alicia Witt)
1996	Murder, She Wrote	Bill Dawson	Episode: "Kendo Killing"
1997	Contagious	Sam	Television Movie
1997	Crisis Center	Chuck Goodman	Episode: "Someone to Watch Over Me"
1997	The Dukes of Hazzard: Reunion!	Luke Duke	Television movie
1997–1998	Home Improvement	Ian	2 episodes
1998	Meteorites!	Tom Johnson	Television movie
1999	The Dukes of Hazzard: Racing for Home	Luke Duke	Video game
2000	The Dukes of Hazzard: Hazzard in Hollywood	Luke Duke	Television movie
2001	100 Centre Street	Hanley Rand	Episode: "Lost Causes"
2001–02	All My Children	Hank Pelham	Unknown episodes
2004	The Dukes of Hazzard: Return of the General Lee	Luke Duke	Video game
2005	Smallville	Senator Jack Jennings	Episode: "Exposed"
2006	Standoff	Rick Keeslar	Episode: "Pilot"
2006	Bonneville	Arlo	
2007	Manhunt 2	The Bloodhounds	Video game
2007	The History of Wisconsin Football	(voice)	Video
2008	The Hive	Bill	Television movie
2008	The Understudy	Detective Jones	
2009	Taking Chance	John Phelps	Television movie
2010	Jonah Hex	Colonel Slocum	
2010	Main Street	Frank	
2010–11	Phineas and Ferb	Wilkins Brother No. 2 (voice)	2 episodes
2012	Django Unchained	U. S. Marshall Gill Tatum	
2012	Mariachi Gringo	Ron	
2012	Blue Bloods	Craig Iverson	Season 2 Episode 16 "Women with Guns"
2012–17	Longmire	Sheriff Jim Wilkins	6 episodes
2013	Lovestruck: The Musical	Ryan Hutton	Television movie
2015	All in Time	Dentist	
2016	Fair Haven	Richard Grant	
2016	Elementary	Soble	Season 4 Episode 9 "Murder Ex Machina"
2017	Lost Cat Corona	Jimmy Pipes	
2017	New Money	John Breckner	
2018	County Line	Alden Rockwell	
2019	Delight in the Mountain	Guido	
2020	The Blacklist	Warden Roy Cain	Episode: "Roy Cain"
2022	County Line: All In	Alden Rockwell	
2022	County Line: No Fear	Alden Rockwell	

== Discography ==
=== Albums ===
Year	Album	Label
1981	The Dukes of Hazzard (soundtrack)	Volcano
1983	Tom Wopat	Columbia
1987	A Little Bit Closer	EMI America
1988	Don't Look Back	Capitol
1991	Learning to Love	Epic
1995	Hands On	self-released
2000	The Still of the Night	Angel
2005	Tom Wopat Sings Harold Arlen: Dissertation on the State of Bliss	Big Deal
2009	Consider it Swung	LML
2013	I've Got Your Number	LML
2014	Home for Christmas (with John Schneider)	Wopat Music
2017	Wopat	PledgeMusic
2022	Simple Man	Wopat Music

=== Singles ===
Year	Title	Peak positions		Album
Year	Title	US Country	CAN Country	Album
1982	"Full Moon, Empty Pockets"	—	—	Tom Wopat
1983	"(Till) I Kissed You"	—	—	Tom Wopat
1983	"Sha-Marie"	—	—	Tom Wopat
1986	"True Love (Never Did Run Smooth)"	39	—	A Little Bit Closer
1986	"I Won't Let You Down"	44	—	A Little Bit Closer
1986	"The Rock and Roll of Love"	16	14	A Little Bit Closer
1987	"Put Me Out of My Misery"	28	25	A Little Bit Closer
1987	"Susannah"	20	—	A Little Bit Closer
1988	"A Little Bit Closer"	18	—	A Little Bit Closer
1988	"Hey Little Sister"	40	—	Don't Look Back
1988	"Not Enough Love"	29	—	Don't Look Back
1991	"Too Many Honky Tonks (On My Way Home)"	46	46	Learning to Love
1991	"Back to the Well"	51	54	Learning to Love

=== Music videos ===
Year	Video	Director
1988	"A Little Bit Closer"	—N/a
1991	"Back to the Well"	Sherman Halsey
