= Bo Duke =

- The Dukes of Hazzard character
- Bo Duke in The Dukes of Hazzard
- First appearance: "One Armed Bandits", first episode of The Dukes of Hazzard
- Portrayed by: John Schneider - 1979; Seann William Scott - 2005; Jonathan Bennett - 2007

In-universe information
- Gender: Male
- Occupation: Race Car Driver, Mechanic and Former NASCAR Driver Marine reserve
- Significant other: Gabriela (The Dukes of Hazzard: Hazzard in Hollywood); Annette (The Dukes of Hazzard (film))
- Relatives: Daisy Duke (cousin); Luke Duke (cousin); Coy Duke (cousin); Vance Duke (cousin); Jesse Duke (uncle); Jud Duke (cousin); Joe Duke (great-great-grandfather)
- Religion: Christian
- Nationality: American

Beauregard "Bo" Duke (born circa 1958) is a fictional character in the American television series The Dukes of Hazzard, he is the second main protagonist in the series, which ran from 1979 to 1985. He was played by John Schneider.

== Fictional biography in the television series ==
Bo and his cousin Lucas K. "Luke" Duke (Tom Wopat) live in an unincorporated area of the fictional Hazzard County, in Georgia. Bo and Luke own a 1969 Dodge Charger, named The General Lee, which is painted orange, with the Confederate flag on top, and 01 painted on the sides with the name "General Lee" inscribed above the doors that were welded shut for safety. Bo and Luke evade the corrupt officials of Hazzard County, Boss Hogg and Sheriff Rosco P. Coltrane and usually end up putting an end to Hogg's latest crooked scheme.

The Dukes (including cousin Daisy Duke and Uncle Jesse Duke) were well known for their role in the moonshine business among other interests. Bo and Luke had both been sentenced to probation for illegal transportation of moonshine. As a result, neither was permitted to use firearms, instead preferring to use bow and arrows, which they sometimes tipped with dynamite. The terms of Bo and Luke's probation included staying within the boundaries of Hazzard County (unless given special permission by their Probation Officer, J.D. Hogg).

=== Physical appearance and personality ===
Bo was the blond, younger of the two Duke boys (according to the episode "Happy Birthday, General Lee", Bo was getting out of high school around the time that Luke was wrapping up his enlistment in the United States Marines), and the more impulsive one of the pair. He often reacted to situations on impulse without thinking, sometimes with an "act/speak now, think later" attitude. This trait was an advantage at most times, since it made him willing to dive into dangerous situations without any regard for his safety, however he bit off more than he could chew a few times. Bo was a superior driver to his cousin Luke, probably the reason he drove most often and was the first Duke to jump the General Lee. Although Bo was not professionally trained in boxing like Luke was, he was entirely capable of taking care of himself, even saving Luke in a fight on occasion. As with his cousins Luke and Daisy, Bo's tendency to fall in love easily led the Dukes into trouble a few times, most prominently in the feature-length/two-part story "Carnival of Thrills". Bo was the only Duke to perform a "roof slide".

=== Clothing ===
The character was nearly always seen wearing the same style of clothes, with a yellow shirt (with a blue T-shirt underneath for the first two seasons and some of third; this T-shirt is brown in the pilot episode), and light blue jeans. The exact hue of the shirt varied across the seasons - early on it was a deeper yellow; mid-run it was more of a cream color, and late examples saw it being more of a grey tone, and he did wear a yellowish-brown shirt in seasons 6-7. The second episode produced and broadcast, "Daisy's Song", is notable for Bo instead wearing a red shirt for much of the story. A sequence in the fifth episode, "High Octane", sees Bo dressed in a light blue shirt, and many early publicity shots see the character dressed in a darker blue denim shirt.

=== Catchphrases ===
The character of Bo was best known for his rebel yell exclamation of the catchphrase, "Yee-Haa!"; cousin Luke sometimes also performed such a yell, but on a less regular basis. (Actor Tom Wopat had trouble mastering the high-pitched yell early on, and in the opening credits and many examples within the episodes, it is actually a recording of John Schneider's version used twice to represent both Duke boys' yell).

=== The General Lee ===
Most of the time, it was Bo who drove The General Lee, with his cousin Luke riding shotgun (although these roles were swapped more regularly in later seasons); very early episodes suggested that the General belonged solely to Bo (Luke is said to have had a car that was wrecked very shortly before the start of the first episode, "One Armed Bandits"), but by mid-first season, it was implied that both Bo and Luke owned the General Lee evenly between them.

=== Car racing ===
After Bo graduated high school in-and-around 1976 he became a stock car driver (though he joined the NASCAR Circuit for most of season 5 with his cousin Luke), and he was typically the one known for taking the General on most of its legendary jumps. Because its doors were welded shut, Bo and Luke always had to climb in and out of the car through the windows. Actors John Schneider and Tom Wopat have admitted that, on occasions that the roles were reversed and Luke drove, they found it much more difficult to climb in and out of the opposite window to which they were accustomed.

Bo later left Hazzard County, along with his cousin Luke, to join the NASCAR circuit (coinciding with Schneider's and Wopat's decision to walk out of the show during the fifth season over a dispute over royalties owed to them), although how they managed to do this with the probation conditions in place was never revealed; Bo's cousin Coy (Byron Cherry), who was very similar in both appearance and nature to Bo, replaced Bo until he returned to the series a few months later (Yet another cousin, Vance, replaced Luke during the same time frame).

== Fictional biography in films ==
According to the 1997 film The Dukes of Hazzard: Reunion!, Bo left Hazzard again to pursue a successful NASCAR career, this time without Luke. Shortly before his return to Hazzard, he crashed his car, and is still in Hazzard in the 2000 film The Dukes of Hazzard: Hazzard in Hollywood. Although he was a lifelong bachelor, in the 2000 film, he met a Mexican-American woman named Gabrielle (nicknamed Gabby) in Los Angeles and convinced her to go to Hazzard to be with him.
