= Boss Hogg =

Fictional character

- The Dukes of Hazzard character
- First appearance: "One Armed Bandits", first episode of The Dukes of Hazzard
- Portrayed by: Sorrell Booke - 1979; Burt Reynolds - 2005; Christopher McDonald - 2007

In-universe information
- Gender: Male
- Occupation: County commissioner
- Relatives: Lulu Coltrane-Hogg (wife); Abraham Lincoln Hogg (twin brother); Sheriff Roscoe P. Coltrane (brother-in-law); Hughie Hogg (nephew); Jamie Lee Hogg (nephew); Cletus Hogg (third cousin)
- Nationality: American

Jefferson Davis Hogg, known as Boss Hogg, is a fictional character featured in the American television series The Dukes of Hazzard. He was the county commissioner of Hazzard County, and the county's political boss and the main antagonist of the show. Boss Hogg almost always wore an all-white suit with a white cowboy hat and regularly smoked cigars. His namesake is Jefferson Davis, the president of the Confederate States of America. The role of Boss Hogg was played by Sorrell Booke, who performed frequently on radio, stage, television, and film prior to his role in The Dukes of Hazzard. The character was played by Burt Reynolds in the 2005 film.

== Description ==
"Boss" Hogg was the sole commissioner of (fictional) Hazzard County, Georgia, and thus, held all executive and judicial powers therein. (In reality, Georgia is the only state which still allows this form of government, and in only seven of its 159 counties.) As the wealthiest man in the county, he would do almost anything to get his hands on more money, including executing many nefarious and criminal schemes. However, he does not tolerate anyone (even the Dukes, despite Hogg's constant rivalry with them) getting physically hurt in the process. He also refuses to have anything to do with illegal drugs, regardless of money. Boss Hogg is described in one analysis as "an ineffectual bad guy—hence amusing".

Hogg owned most of Hazzard's property and businesses, either directly or by holding the mortgages over the land. His lust for money often drove him to participate in criminal activities—usually by enlisting the aid of associates—mainly his brother-in-law, who was his right-hand man and partner in crime, Sheriff Rosco P. Coltrane. Together, the two schemed to frame the Duke family for crimes they did not commit. Rosco's deputies, Enos Strate and Cletus Hogg (Boss's cousin), have also aided Boss Hogg, though Enos (and to a lesser extent, Cletus) were more reluctant to do so. According to Waylon Jennings' narration, he had a "cradle to grave" earning plan; in that if you were a Hazzard County resident, you were born at the local hospital (owned by Hogg), you lived in a house that he owned the deed to, worked at one of his businesses, and when you died, his casket company would make your pine box.

Boss Hogg's greed only seemed to fuel his lust for more and more wealth. He was chauffeured around in the back of a Cadillac (though he drove himself around in later seasons), all-white in color to match his all-white suit. Other clothing (such as jogging suits, etc.) and other accessories, and much of his own mansion home, were also decked out in white.

Boss is forever angry at the Duke family, particularly Bo and Luke, for continually exposing and halting his various crooked schemes. Despite the Dukes coming to his rescue on occasion, Hogg forever seems to have an irrational dislike of the clan, often accusing them of spying on him, robbing or planning to rob him, and other supposedly nefarious actions as he believes they are generally out to get him. Although this characteristic is present throughout the show's run, it is particularly evident in the earlier seasons. One episode has Uncle Jesse mentioning that he and Boss had known one another "since we were kids", and others mention that they had run moonshine together.

Just like the exact specifications of the Duke Boys' probation rules, the extent of just what was and wasn't within Boss's powers often seemed to vary from episode to episode. However, this can be countermanded slightly, as Boss would often bend the law and make up rules to suit himself.

Every morning, Boss Hogg would drink coffee and eat raw liver (as seen in the pilot episode, "One Armed Bandits" and several later episodes). Method actor Sorrell Booke actually ate the raw liver.

Sorrell Booke was only slightly overweight at best. He wore padding under his suit to give Boss his familiar 62 inch waist.

Initially, the character was created as a nemesis for the Duke family to battle, but as the series evolved over its first and subsequent seasons, Hogg developed more into a comical money-grabbing villain, with more intent on performing various get-rich-quick schemes and shady plots, than ever knowingly causing anyone serious harm. With this evolution of the character, for which the foundations were set over the course of the first half-season, came the closer pairing of Hogg and Sheriff Rosco P. Coltrane (James Best), and as the pair's comical ability together became apparent and a popular element of the series, Booke and Best were often given permission to ad-lib and improvise their scenes together.

By the time of the 1997 reunion movie, Booke had died, so rather than replace him with a new actor or similar character, Hogg's death was written into the script. He willed his empire to Rosco P. Coltrane, who continued to pursue zany schemes, many of which Boss had come up with before his death.

=== Schemes ===
==== Criminal ====
In a typical episode of The Dukes of Hazzard, Boss hires others to carry out his crimes, then diverts the blame onto the Dukes, usually the cousins Bo and Luke. Some of Hogg's favorite schemes include bank and armored car robbery, counterfeiting, fraud, and moonshine running. He especially enjoyed trying to trick Bo and Luke into violating their probation (for illegal transportation of moonshine) by running moonshine, or crossing the county line.

Boss reasons that by framing Bo and Luke, he will more easily acquire the Duke farm—the property he most covets, and for which he held the mortgage—for little to no cost. Usually, this is so he can develop the land (for profit, of course) in various ways. When the Dukes are not targeted, it is generally a friend of the Dukes—auto mechanic Cooter Davenport, postmistress Miz Emma Tisdale, county worker Emery Potter, general store owner Mr. Rhuebottom, and others—who find themselves on the wrong side of Hogg's schemes.

It is usually up to Bo and Luke to foil Boss's schemes, defeat his associates, and make things right. Though Boss's crimes should land him in prison, he usually winds up with little more than a slap on the wrist, such as donating his ill-gotten proceeds to charity, or having to personally re-sow by hand a crop that he had destroyed. He often worms his way out of trouble by foisting the blame for his schemes onto associates. This has left him with a reputation for untrustworthiness and double-crossing in the criminal world, and had made him many enemies who come back for revenge.

Boss lusts for "simoleons", but has his limits; he refuses to risk anyone's life or safety for the sake of his schemes. More than once, he has sacrificed his potential earnings to save lives that would otherwise be imperiled by his greed (this is especially true in later seasons). His conscience has landed him into trouble with his former partners in the past. He stands by his word, but only if he "spits and shakes" on it. On several occasions, when Boss's disgruntled or devious associates attempted to exact revenge for Boss's betrayal, Bo and Luke always came to his rescue.

Boss held various positions in the community, including County Commissioner, Police Commissioner, Chief of the Volunteer Fire Department, Justice of the Peace, and Bank President. All of these organizations seemed to suffer from his greed. It seems in some episodes that his position of County Commissioner is elected; Hogg was even once defeated for this office (by one vote, cast at the last minute), but Boss was back in charge in the following episode.

==== Traffic ====
Boss constantly looks for new, usually dishonest methods to bring revenue into the county (and thereby, into his pocketbook). Some of the more memorable schemes involve Rosco setting up fake fire hydrants next to parked cars, using hair dryers as radar guns (to ticket people for speeding), and placing hidden stop signs or speed limit signs that mysteriously spring into view after an unsuspecting motorist drives by.

Boss's traffic schemes have also resulted in country music and other performers "working off" their fines, by performing at "The Boar's Nest". Famous singer victims include: Roy Orbison, Buck Owens, Mel Tillis, Dottie West, Tammy Wynette, Hoyt Axton, Johnny Paycheck and The Oak Ridge Boys twice, Loretta Lynn, and Mickey Gilley, whose performance he also tried to pirate.

=== Rivalries ===
Despite Boss Hogg's unending desire to have Bo and Luke imprisoned for crimes they did not commit, his principal rival always remained their uncle, Jesse Duke. Jesse and J.D. had a feud dating back to their ridge-running days in the 1930s, which continued to simmer after Bo and Luke were indicted for moonshine-running, and Jesse began protecting them from J.D.

Though they rarely got along, Jesse and J.D. held a grudging respect for one another and enjoyed a "friendship" of sorts (Jesse once claimed he and Hogg were "friends and enemies"), as both would help each other when circumstances warranted. However, Jesse Duke was well aware of J.D.'s greedy nature, and the wizened Duke patriarch frequently warned his nephews and niece about Hogg's antics. When Uncle Jesse needed a favor of Boss Hogg, he would often say "I've never asked you for anything", and the question appeared new to the portly Hogg each time. Furthermore, whenever Jesse and J.D. do formally agree to something, it is always with a "spit and shake" of hands; in one episode, J.D. insists that without "spit and shake", any promises made by him are not binding. In one episode, when Hogg becomes involved with some very serious criminals who threaten Jesse's life, he intervenes and insists that they don't hurt him.

Despite the fact that they constantly thwarted his plots, and while he often derided them even when they were helping him, Hogg was willing to swallow his pride when the Dukes offered him aid; while the Dukes have no love for Hogg, it is clear they are aware that Boss has never willingly put lives at risk. Hogg and the Dukes appear to almost enjoy their rivalry on some level, as Hogg could easily have foreclosed on the mortgage he holds on the Dukes' land long ago, yet never has; either Boss is honest enough to accept the Dukes' payments to keep their land in their possession, or he merely wants the satisfaction of removing them via one of his schemes. Whether Hogg genuinely wants the Dukes out of the way, or is simply harassing them for fun, is never made clear. The Dukes, for their part, thoroughly enjoy their clashes with Hogg when thwarting him despite the issues he causes. Despite this, they have never made any serious attempt to have him removed from his position, via any of their friends who can cross the Hazzard county line and report on his corrupt actions, indicating that they are unwilling to see Hogg truly placed in legal trouble, despite all the issues he causes for them. Whether this is out of respect for Hogg's strange friendship with their uncle Jesse or not was never revealed.

=== Family ===
Boss is married to Rosco's "fat sister", Lulu Coltrane Hogg, making Boss and Rosco brothers-in-law. In the first episode, "One Armed Bandits", and referenced again in some later episodes, Boss mentions that she had him give Rosco the role of Sheriff so that he would have a safe job. It is this "debt" that, in the earliest episodes at least, seems to have Rosco continually working for Boss in repayment.

As with several of the other characters, the version of Lulu seen in the early episodes is slightly different to the version portrayed later. In her lone first season appearance ("Repo Men"), she is played as spoiled (she is seen to be demanding that Boss buy her a Rolls-Royce for her birthday). Her single second season appearances (in "The Rustlers") also shows her in a similar light. As the character progressed and appeared on a more regular basis in the series, the character softened, becoming a kind and more level-headed woman, who became involved with several local charities and projects. Although in some earlier instances, although she didn't seem keen on the Dukes, she was more hospitable towards them. By the later seasons, Lulu was often seen to be on friendly terms with the family - particularly Jesse, with whom she would occasionally consort if she thought Boss was getting himself too deep into trouble. She and Daisy also seemed to hold a friendship, as she hired Daisy into the Hazzard Equal Rights Society and in a later episode they were seen to be returning together from an out-of-town shopping trip.

Although Boss frequently takes his wife for granted, Lulu has no patience for Boss's shady antics, and is clearly the dominant personality in the relationship, even acting as her husband's Achilles' heel in his latest crooked scheme (and succeeding on occasion). At one point, she threatens to leave Boss and take half of his holdings; he quickly backs down. While apprehensive to trust her, and scheming behind her back at all times, Boss seems to genuinely love Lulu, frequently calling her such pet names, as "Angel Food Cake", "Marshmallow", and "Sugarplum Puddin'."

Boss also has an antithetical identical twin brother, Abraham Lincoln Hogg, who appeared in one episode of the show (the third season's "Baa, Baa White Sheep"). Also played by Booke, A.L Hogg was the opposite of J.D.—he was kind, honest, law-abiding, dressed in black, and drove a black Cadillac—and was friendly with the Dukes, particularly Uncle Jesse.

Boss and Lulu are childless, but have at least three nephews: Hughie Hogg, Dewey Hogg and Jamie Lee Hogg (Jonathan Frakes). Like their uncle, both Hughie and Jamie Lee are often up to no good: Hughie (who, like his uncle, wore an all-white three-piece suit, though he drove a Volkswagen Beetle, in stark contrast to Boss's Cadillac) is often more crooked than Boss Hogg, and is seen in some episodes blackmailing and using wise tactics, while Jamie Lee is seen in only one episode (see below).

Deputy Sheriff Cletus Hogg is also Boss's third cousin.

Jolene Hunnicutt, who is a character on the sitcom Alice, is a distant relative of Hogg due to her Granny Gums being part of his family. Like The Dukes of Hazzard, Alice was produced by Warner Bros. Television. Boss made one appearance on Alice. The episode "Mel is Hogg-Tied" had Boss Hogg and Deputy Enos Strate visiting Phoenix, Arizona where Hogg tries to swindle Mel Sharples by buying Mel's diner for $1.00. It was also mentioned that Hogg foreclosed on a property owned by Jolene's grandmother.

=== Alter ego ===
In the third-season episode "The Late J.D. Hogg", Boss is wrongly diagnosed with a fatal illness, and adopts a nice, kind persona, only to revert to his usual crooked, mean self when he learns that he is not really about to die.

In "No More Mr. Nice Guy" (Episode: #7.5 – original airdate: 19 October 1984), Boss Hogg suffered amnesia as a result of being hit on the head. When he awakened, he was a kind, caring, honest, and fair man, who intended to "clean up Hazzard County of all corruption". He did not like being referred to as "Boss" or even as "J.D.", instead identifying himself as "Jefferson Davis Hogg with two G's", or just "Jefferson" for short. Jefferson actually liked and appreciated the Dukes for the help they bring to Hazzard, and helped them whenever he could—until he received another bump on the head (many times, via Rosco) and turned back into the ruthless, corrupt Boss Hogg.

=== Vehicle ===
Boss Hogg's car was a triple white 1970 Cadillac DeVille (1976 Cadillac Eldorado in the 2005 film) convertible, with large bull horns for a hood ornament, and in the movies sported pistol shaped door handles. He had a chauffeur named Alex, who drove the car in the first few seasons; in later years, Hogg became the car's principal driver and frequently challenged others by invoking his driving expertise from his days as a ridge-runner. Unlike other vehicles in the series, Boss Hogg's Cadillac is typically handled carefully, and he was always blaming Cooter if even the smallest thing happened to it.

=== Holdings ===
Some of Boss Hogg's holdings (either directly or by mortgage) include:

- The Duke Farm – Boss held the mortgage.
- The Boar's Nest – The local watering hole where Daisy Duke was employed as a waitress. Boss also has an office in the back, where he does most of his dealings.
- Hazzard County Bank – The local bank where Boss served as president, owner, and COO.
- Cooter's Garage – Owned by the Dukes' friend Cooter Davenport. Boss held the mortgage.
- HOGGOCO Oil and Petroleum Co. – Boss has gas stations all over Hazzard County, and HOGGOCO fuel pumps in front of both The Boars Nest and Cooter's Garage.
- The Hazzard County Gazette – The weekly newspaper serving Hazzard County.
- The Hazzard Phone Company – Boss had all of the operators in his pocket, and his cousin Maybel or local girl Gussie tell him whenever any calls of interest came through Hazzard.
- WHOGG – The only radio station in Hazzard County. Boss served as president.
- Hogg Grits Mill – Abandoned by Boss only to be occupied for dubious purposes by his nephew Jamie Lee Hogg.
- Hogg's Heavenly Acres – Boss charged a handsome fee to be buried here in Hazzard's only public cemetery, sometimes even double-selling plots.
- J.D. Hogg Logging & Sawmill
- J.D. Hogg Ice House – Abandoned by Boss only to be occupied by a group of crooks who are out to steal ten million dollars from armored trucks.
- J.D. Hogg Real Estate
- J.D. Hogg Funeral Home
- J.D. Hogg Gravel Company
- J.D. Hogg Painting Company
- J.D. Hogg Used Cars
- The Hazzard Coffin Works – Boss ran the Coffin Works as a place to store his moonshine. It was taken as a hide out for the ridge-raiders, Russel "Snake" Harmon used the building as a place to hide from Texas Ranger Jude Emery, and Boss Hogg's hired crooks Turk and Moody used it as a hideout.
- J.D. Hogg Investment Corporation -Public services controlled by Hogg
- Hazzard County Public Works
- Hazzard County Sheriffs Department - Hogg is the police commissioner. Sheriff Coltrane works there.
- Hazzard County Volunteer Fire Department - Hogg is the fire chief. In some episodes Bo, Luke, and Uncle Jesse also appear to be firefighters, seemingly putting their differences aside for the public good, although Hogg steals the alarm fees. It is said that in one second-season episode that a man named Amos Petersdorf is the fire chief and the fire truck and station are both different. It is possible that Hazzard has two fire companies with one commanded by Hogg and the other by Petersdorf.
- Hazzard County Hospital - It is said in a first-season episode by the Balladeer that Hogg owns the hospital.
- Hazzard County Dog Pound
- Hazzard Livery Stable

== In other media ==
=== Cartoon ===
Boss Hogg appeared in The Dukes voiced by Sorrell Booke. This cartoon lasted for two seasons, both in 1983, for a total of 20 episodes. The series had the Duke boys and Daisy raising him, Roscoe, and Flash across the world where the Dukes want to win the prize money so that Boss Hogg won't foreclose on the Duke family farm. As explained by Jesse in the intro, Boss actually wants the money and land for himself where he does various schemes to beat the Dukes which goes comically awry.

=== Film ===
In Moonrunners—the precursor film to the Dukes of Hazzard—the character that would go on to be developed into Boss Hogg, was named Jake Rainey (played by George Ellis). Like Boss Hogg, Jake was an old friend of Uncle Jesse, who had risen from running moonshine with Jesse in the old days, to boss of the county. Jake also had the loyalty of Sheriff Rosco Coltrane, although this bond wasn't as close as it was in the TV series.

Burt Reynolds played Boss Hogg in The Dukes of Hazzard (2005), the big-screen remake of the TV series. This version of Boss was far more serious and wily than his TV counterpart. Although it was indicated that this Boss Hogg enjoyed fine cuisine and had a slightly enlarged belly, he was not the overweight glutton of the television series.

Christopher McDonald played Boss Hogg in The Dukes of Hazzard: The Beginning (2007). Much like Reynolds' portrayal, Hogg was not overweight as his TV series version was, although he was decidedly taller (McDonald is 6'3", nine inches taller than Booke and Reynolds were).

=== Video games ===
Boss Hogg appears in the game The Dukes of Hazzard: Racing for Home, voiced by Wayne Powers.

=== Other television appearances ===
A drunken hallucination Boss Hogg appears to Dee Reynolds in It's Always Sunny in Philadelphia Season 10, Episode 1, "The Gang Beats Boggs" after she confuses Wade Boggs and Boss Hogg. He was played by American actor Jerry Hauck.

== Reception and legacy ==
He has been described as a "stereotypical corrupt public figure". Writing in 2017, Lexye L. Schockley saw in Boss Hogg, although fictional and "exaggerated on all fronts", the image of a flawed local leader who abuses his unchecked power, who have been and still are not uncommon in small-town politics. S. Robert Lichter et al. characterized Boss Hogg as the "blustery county commissioner and machine-style political boss" of his rural area, and saw in the figure a typical example of a "trend was toward casting foolish or bumbling politicians in humorous roles" in American television in the 1980s. Boss Hogg has also been described as a stereotypical "Southerner", but in contrast to the "sly Duke boys", focusing on the negative traits of bigotry and stupidity.

Boss Hogg's initials "J. D." inspired part of the name of J D Wetherspoon, a pub chain with locations around the United Kingdom and Ireland.
