= Gy Waldron =

American screenwriter and director (born 1932)

- Born: Gyneth Markley Waldron; August 5, 1932 (age 94); Lenoxburg, Kentucky, U.S.
- Education: University of Georgia
- Occupations: Screenwriter, film director
- Known for: Creator of The Dukes of Hazzard

Gyneth Markley "Gy" Waldron (born August 5, 1932) is an American screenwriter best known as the writer/director of the movie Moonrunners, and creator of the television series, The Dukes of Hazzard.

== Life and career ==
Born in Lenoxburg, Kentucky (about 60 km [35 miles] southeast of Cincinnati, Ohio), Waldron developed characters from his first film into the hit television series for CBS. He also wrote episodes for One Day at a Time as well as several TV movies.
