= Axis & Allies (2004 video game) =

- Game box cover art
- Developer: TimeGate Studios
- Publisher: Atari
- Producers: Alan Chaveleh; Adel Chaveleh; Ian Klimon
- Designer: Brian Wood
- Artist: Phillip Morales
- Writer: Mark Yohalem
- Composer: Julian Soule
- Engine: Gamebryo
- Platform: Microsoft Windows
- Release: November 2, 2004
- Genre: Real-time strategy
- Modes: Single-player, multiplayer

Axis & Allies is a real-time strategy World War II video game developed by TimeGate Studios and published by Atari for Microsoft Windows. The game was released on November 2, 2004. It is based on the board game series Axis & Allies from Milton Bradley and also on TimeGate's Kohan series. Set in the years after Japan and the United States entered into the war, the game allows the player to act as a World War II commander to build military forces to fight against other generals, using military units and technologies from the war. The player is able to alter the history of World War II.

The game is TimeGate's best-selling game release, upon the company's closure in 2013. The game was met with positive reception, although GameSpy and GameSpot stated the game fell short in terms of AI mechanics and in an overemphasis on base management. Axis & Allies: Collector's Edition was released as a new name for the game on August 28, 2006 by Encore Software.

== Gameplay ==
In Axis & Allies, the player assumes the role of a military general of one of the five superpowers of World War II: the United States, Great Britain, Germany, Soviet Union, and Japan. Each nation has access to its own unique military units, such as Katyusha rockets for the Soviets, flamethrower tanks for the British, and King Tiger tanks for the Germans. Four generals exist for each nation, with each general having access to unique Special Operation abilities, such as summoning fake tanks, deploying a secret agent, or giving an area buff to friendly units. Particularly noteworthy are the most expensive Special Operations, which include large damaging area of effect abilities such as carpet bombing, kamikazes, V-weapons, and nuclear bombs.

The player battles against other generals in one of three game modes: World War II, custom game, and campaign mode. Gameplay is played mainly in the real-time strategy genre, though turn-based strategy is used in WWII mode. The primary objective of gameplay is to destroy all opposing enemy military forces, though some campaigns and maps require other objectives to be completed, such as capturing certain cities, escorting a caravan, or defending a specific area. A "City Control" percentage option may be enabled, in which the winner of the battle goes to the first side/team to capture a set percentage of cities on the map.

Like in other RTS games, the player must expend resources to construct buildings and recruit units to fight the enemy, while maintaining an economy, progressing through a build tree, and researching upgrades. In standard gameplay, the player deploys building trucks from a Corps HQ, the main military headquarters building. These building trucks can "unpack" into all other essential buildings, which aid in producing combat units, technologies, and the three major resources of the game: money, ammo, and oil. Money is obtained as a constant flow of revenue from specific buildings and is used to purchase combat units and technologies, whereas ammo and oil are static resources provided by buildings, and are used for combat unit upkeep. Combat units of their corresponding types are deployed from four classes of buildings: Infantry, Airborne, Mechanized, and Armor Division HQs.

Axis & Allies also includes special gameplay features, such as regimental control, chained supply, and morale.

Recon Infantry regiments fighting near a Corps HQ with an Infantry Division HQ on fire.

"Regiments" are the base combat groups that the player can control. A regiment is composed of a certain squad of units, where a unit can be, for example, an Anti-Tank Infantry, a Halftrack, or a Light Tank. The player controls the entire regiment as a whole, but cannot select and control its individual units. Every unit within a regiment is different, for example, a tank destroyer will paralyze units while mortar units will splash bombard. A regiment can be toggled into three states of unit formation, which trade the regiment's movement speed for attack efficiency, meaning hit-and-run attacks are less damaging than slow advances. There is also a feature called "entrenchment" in which a regiment gains a large defensive bonus if idle for a certain period of time. Furthermore, regiments gain experience from battles and have four tiers of veterancy, which improve the attack and defense of the regiment's units with each level.

The game includes three types of units: ground units, air units, and naval units. All regiments are made up of ground units; they are blocked by mountains and slowed by forests, sand, and cities, though infantry units gain a defensive bonus while in forests or cities. Secondly, air units can fly over mountains, but they move and attack automatically; they can be deployed but not controlled by the player. Thirdly, naval units travel in water, but can neither be healed nor recruited, and thus they only appear in campaigns.

In addition, the game employs a feature called a zone of supply for replenishing regiments, defined by a surrounding green border. Regiments heal and replace missing troops within the zone of supply through "chaining" to Division HQs of their type. The player's main Corps HQ, as well as cities, are the primary sources for emanating the zone of supply. Other buildings can extend the zone of supply so that regiments far from a base of operations can replenish troops. In addition, most buildings are able to be packed and relocated to redraw supply lines, if needed.

Battles are also fought around a special feature called morale, which represents a regiment's tendency to rout from battle. Each regiment features a morale bar, which decreases as the regiment is engaged in battle. If morale drops below a threshold, the regiment's banner will flash white and the regiment makes an uncontrolled retreat away from the enemy. If the morale bar reaches zero, the regiment becomes frozen in place until it either gains its morale back or is killed. This makes prolonging battles costly, but the player can avoid regiments from routing by manually retreating them before their morale drops too low. Enemy artillery fire and flame attacks diminish the morale bar more rapidly. Some Special Operation abilities are used to affect the morale of friendly and enemy units.

=== WWII mode ===
WWII mode.

WWII mode is a game mode which allows the player to wage war across the globe in a traditional turn-based fashion. It resembles a turn-based computer variant of the Axis & Allies board games, but with the option to fight battles in RTS mode. The player fights WWII in how they see fit, effectively "changing the course of history."

At the start, the player chooses a nation and a general to play as, then the game displays a game board showing a panoramic map of the world with territory tiles. A number of territories, such as Australia or Germany, have defensive pieces already in place. The player and computer players take turns purchasing infantry, mechanized, armor, and air support pieces from their home country and move them across the map to engage enemy armies and territories. Each nation has reduced recruitment cost for a specific military piece; for example, Germany recruits cheaper armor pieces, Russia has cheaper infantry pieces, and Japan has cheaper air support pieces. Moreover, each nation can purchase technologies to increase the chance that its battles will be successful; these are the same researches encountered in RTS mode. Either the Allies or Axis wins when two capitals of the opposing side are conquered.

Battles that occur are chosen by the player to be fought in either of two ways: as a "quick resolve" battle or as an "RTS battle". "Quick resolves" are computerized simulations of the battles and the outcome is immediate. Probability of victory is based on army sizes and technologies researched by the attacking and defending armies. In contrast, "RTS battles" are fought using the normal real-time strategy mode. These battles procedurally generate their maps from the board game state. The quantity of military pieces attacking and defending a territory determines each player's starting money and starting forces in the RTS battle. Furthermore, the particular types of pieces contesting a territory restricts the types of units (i.e. infantry, mechanized, armor, air) that each player is able to deploy. A special feature is that if pieces converge to attack from multiple territories, forces appear in the corresponding directions in the battle. In addition, these battles take place in the appropriate biomes of the contested territories (e.g. island, coastal region, desert, forestland).

There are only two major resources in WWII mode: money and technologies. Money is used to purchase military pieces and technologies. It is obtained every turn as the sum of the income values of controlled territories. Technologies, on the other hand, are purchased to increase the probability of victory in "quick resolve" battles. Purchasing technologies also pre-researches them in RTS battles.

The primary rules of the board game are as follows. If an attacking army defeats a defending army, the weakest piece of the defeated army is destroyed and the rest of the army retreats to a nearby allied territory. If the defending army is unable to retreat to nearby allied territory (i.e. completely surrounded), then the entire army is destroyed. However, if the defender is the victor, then the weakest piece of the attacker's army is destroyed and the rest of the attacking army retreats back to their original territory. If a piece moves into a neutral territory or an abandoned enemy territory, it will automatically capture that territory at the start of the next turn.

In contrast to the Axis & Allies board games, each player can only attack one territory per turn. Also, naval and air units are not built on the board but appear only during an RTS battle resolution. Moreover, each movable game piece is only given a movement speed of one tile.

=== Custom battle ===
Custom battle is a game mode in which real-time strategy battles are played on either a randomly generated map or on a pre-built map. Both randomly-generated and pre-built maps allow up to 8 players, and are played with the computer or online with real players. For randomly-generated maps, the player is allowed to choose the map's biome (e.g. desert, jungle, grassland), what land features are present on the map (e.g. mountains, forests, sand), how much money and experience points each player starts out with, and many other options. Axis & Allies' built-in random map generator then procedurally generates the map according to the terrain options selected. When playing on a randomly generated map, each player always starts in random locations on the map with the iconic setup of a primary Corps HQ building, some bunker defenses, and a supply depot truck. Gameplay proceeds as usual until a victor is decided by the victory condition of either destroying all enemies or capturing a set percentage of cities, if that option is set.

Map editor.

The Axis & Allies Map Editor allows players to make their own custom battle maps to play in both singleplayer and multiplayer mode. Players are able to customize many map options, including player starting units, scenery objects, terrain layout, audio sources, and game triggers. Game triggers allow for custom creation of cutscenes, unit & VFX spawns, storylines, and military objectives.

Multiplayer games are played in the format of a custom battle; the other two game modes, WWII mode and Campaign mode, are not available for online play. Online players play in solo or team battles on randomly generated maps, or on official or player-created maps. A maximum of 12 players is allowed to join a single game, but only a maximum of 8 players is allowed to actually play. Players who are not playing are allowed to spectate in-game. Players can save multiplayer films, host rooms and games, and make friends and add them to their buddy lists. Online service was supported by GameSpy Arcade, a free online player-matching service. At the beginning of December 2012, GameSpy discontinued online server service to users. However, user direct-connect LAN services can still function.

== Plot ==
Russian Heavy Tank regiments in the Battle of Kursk campaign mission, as part of the Belgorod-Kharkov Offensive Operation.

In Campaign mode, the player is thrust into a series of World War II campaign battles for either the Axis Powers (Germany and Japan) or the Allied Nations (United States, Great Britain, and the Soviet Union) throughout the years of 1941–1945. There are a total of 24 campaign missions: 12 for the Allied and 12 for the Axis.

Playing as the Allies, the course of history goes the way it actually did with the Battle of Normandy sealing Germany's fate and the capture of Iwo Jima and Okinawa sealing Japan's. The campaigns interchange between the armies of Great Britain, the Soviet Union, and the United States of America as time progresses.

Playing as the Axis leads to an alternate history of WWII, based on what-if scenarios. The campaign begins with a tactical German victory in the Battle of Crete. Having driven out British forces in the Mediterranean, Rommel and his Afrika Korps win the Battle of El Alamein, pushing the British all the way back through the Suez Canal. With the fuel-rich Middle East in Axis hands, Germany wins the decisive Battle of Stalingrad and the following year, the endlessly supplied Panzer units crush the Russians at Kursk, effectively sealing the fate of the Eastern Front. Meanwhile, in the Pacific War, Japan manages an invasion of Australia, leaving the Americans without a staging area in the Pacific (it is also suggested that the attack on Pearl Harbor was more successful, with the fleet being sunk in deep waters rather than in the shallow waters of the base). The Battle of Normandy still happens; however, the landing beaches have unfavorable terrain and the Germans' counterattack is successful. The failed invasion at Normandy not only prevented the Allies from opening a new front in the war, it also oversaw Germany's plans to invade Great Britain. With Rundstedt invading from the south and Rommel invading from the west, Operation Sea Lion proved to be a success, forcing the British to surrender.

While Germany deals with partisan resistance, Japan invades India to crush the last of the British forces under the command of Wingate. With Great Britain defeated, Germany is able to turn its attention back to Stalin and the Soviet Union. Japanese advance units under General Kuribayashi and German Panzer divisions under Field Marshal Manstein surround Moscow, but the battle for control of the city turns into a three way brawl with German and Japanese units each vying for control of the city. The battle ends in a German victory. By now, the United States of America is the only Allied nation left to challenge the Axis. With the defeat of British and Australian forces, Japan quickly eliminates the last remaining ships of the American Pacific Fleet and captures Midway, and later Hawaii. With American naval forces crippled beyond repair, the Allies lose their chances of defeating the Axis powers. In the aftermath, America settles into a new Cold War with Japan in the Pacific and Nazi Germany in Europe.

== Development and release ==
Axis & Allies was developed by TimeGate Studios and built using the Kohan II game engine, which laid out much of the framework for the game. Axis & Allies was released about a month later than Kohan II. The people at TimeGate were "very excited to [work] on [the] project with one of the leading publishers in the industry [Atari]", as told by Adel Chaveleh, president of TimeGate Studios. He also said that "[they] have been fans and players of the Axis & Allies franchise for years, and [their] commitment to innovation combined with the popularity of the brand is a definite recipe for a killer title."

The design process of Axis & Allies largely entailed three things: research, visual design, and game triggers. One design task was choosing the missions for the Axis campaign. It was difficult to judge at what point the war should turn in favor of the Axis. It was decided that major changes had to start early in the war. If Rommel had not gotten sick or if Montgomery had never been placed in charge of the British forces in North Africa, the second Axis campaign mission, the Battle of El Alamein, might have been a disaster for the British. The Germans might have broken through and moved on to capture several of the major oil fields in the Middle East. If they had, then Operation Barbarossa might have been successful for Germany, since in the real course of history, German forces had to stop 30 miles from Moscow because some forces had to be diverted to fight for the Caucasus oil fields.

Most of the designers at TimeGate working on the game were history buffs, and they watched World War II movies and documentaries at home for research. The Band of Brothers miniseries was popular with the team. Such research was used to size maps, create the appropriate number of cities, and to select which armies to be present. For example, the Normandy map was designed to be very large to accommodate all five beachheads: Utah, Omaha, Gold, Juno, and Sword. The map was designed to accommodate all four Allied divisions that landed and the two Axis corps defending the coast. For terrain design, the designer or artist working on the map would usually keep an atlas of the region by his desk for reference. The art team produced numerous terrain sets, such as the "Russian winter".

The designers used game triggers to make special game events occur. For example, early development of the Battle of the Bulge mission focused on the defense of Bastogne by the 101st Airborne Division. The map design started out as a city with several airborne companies inside it. Using triggers, German troops were pulled to attack the city many times. If the player could hold out long enough, Patton's third army arrived to break the encirclement.

The turn-based WWII mode in Axis & Allies was chiefly inspired by the Axis & Allies board game series. Although different in how it is played, the mode was said by lead designer Brian Wood to "capture the importance of the economic factors (which are often left out of WWII games), as well as to encompass the global aspect of the board game."

Players who pre-ordered the game would receive a download link for one of two bonus missions: one based on the Battle of Dunkirk, available for those who pre-ordered the Axis & Allies at GameStop, and one on Operation Barabrossa, for customers of Electronics Boutique. Other retailers participated as well.

== Reception ==
Reception

Aggregate scores
Aggregator	Score
GameRankings	67%
Metacritic	65/100

Review scores
Publication	Score
Computer Gaming World	2.5/5
GameSpot	6.0/10
GameSpy	2/5
GameZone	7.8/10
IGN	84/100
Gameplanet	4/5
Game Industry News	4/5
GameWatcher	7.5/10

Axis & Allies was moderately received. The game was rated with a 6.0 by GameSpot, with gaming critics on the site giving a rating of 6.8 and users rating the game with 7.5. IGN rated the game with a score of 8.4, stating that "Axis and Allies RTS stands on its own merits as a great strategy game."

GamePlanet rated the game four out of five stars, marking the game as "a marriage of the original board game and the recent award-winning RTS fantasy title Kohan II", saying that the game "has certainly taken on the best of both and delivered a great little game." XGPGaming touted an 8.7/10 rating, saying that "[they] did a great job on this game, in a genre that has been watered down by the numerous attempts by various companies [...] I recommend everyone who likes real-time strategy games to give this one a try." eToyChest gave a rating of 80%, writing that the game was "worthy to carry the [Axis & Allies] name proudly, and is a tremendously entertaining game in its own right [...] Axis & Allies delivers in terms of pure excitement and plain and simple fun. The game packs in more than enough challenge to keep even the seasoned RTS veterans gritting their teeth, while the online component is sure to keep most any player giddy."

GameSpy gave the game a low two out of five stars, detailing the game as, "Timegate's Kohan goes to World War II and shoots itself in the foot." Tom Chick from GameSpy claimed that, although the game "does a good job of modeling supply lines", he blames the game's incompetence on the "interface [...] confusing and non-intuitive interplay among units [, and] too much base management." GameSpot also been criticized for its weak AI mechanics. However, the game was stated by its developers to be able to "learn and adapt to player strategies as they play the game."

IGN remarked that, artistically, the visuals of Axis & Allies look good:

The unit models are fairly distinguishable at a glance and the animations and movements look very natural. Some of the units tend to bunch up on one another (where, oh, where are those formation controls?) but, otherwise, the effect of seeing troops marching beside halftracks, of seeing planes carpet an area with bombs, or of trees falling before the advance of your armor, is a very positive one that maintains a high level of excitement.

— Steve Butts, IGN

Main menu theme music, sample.

Musically, Butts said: "The music and weapon effects are passable but don't stand out too much. Their chief virtue is in not getting in the way of the gameplay." Chris Stavros from GameWatcher thought the audio and video elements of the game were superb and portrayed the atmosphere of World War II very well:

The music in the game is quite good, dramatic at times, and some of it is used to alert players when units are built and destroyed. The game includes many ingame movies, one for each power, and a movie for each scenario, with excellent voice-over work, that is not corny, but fits [the] mood of the game quite well.

— Chris Stavros, GameWatcher

Larry Harris, the founder of the acclaimed Axis & Allies board game series, was proud to expand the Axis & Allies franchise into the realm of real-time strategy gaming:

I'm proud of how Atari and TimeGate Studios have applied the core elements of strategy and historical relevancy from the board game and applied them to the next generation of Axis & Allies [...] A real-time strategy game is an ideal way for wargamers to see the entire global conflict unfold and then experience the key battles of World War II from the battlefield perspective in the real-time strategy mode.

— Larry Harris, creator of Axis & Allies

Axis & Allies is TimeGate's best-selling game release, upon the company's closure in 2013.

== See also ==
- Axis & Allies board game series
- Axis & Allies (1998 video game)
