= 1984 United States presidential election in Georgia =

- November 6, 1984

Nominee	Ronald Reagan	Walter Mondale
Party	Republican	Democratic
Home state	California	Minnesota
Running mate	George H. W. Bush	Geraldine Ferraro
Electoral vote	12	0
Popular vote	1,068,722	706,628
Percentage	60.17%	39.79%

Reagan
50–60%
60–70%
70–80%
80–90%
Mondale
50–60%
60–70%
70–80%
President before election
Ronald Reagan
Republican
Elected President
Ronald Reagan
Republican

The 1984 United States presidential election in Georgia took place on November 6, 1984. All 50 states and the District of Columbia, were part of the 1984 United States presidential election. Georgia voters chose 12 electors to the Electoral College, which selected the president and vice president of the United States.

Georgia was won by incumbent President Ronald Reagan, running with Vice President George H. W. Bush, defeated former Vice President Walter Mondale of Minnesota, running with U.S. Representative Geraldine Ferraro. Georgia weighed in for this election as 2% more Republican than the national average. The 1984 presidential election in the state of Georgia marked the first time a winning candidate won over a million votes in Georgia.

As of the 2024 presidential election, this is the last election in which Randolph County, Clarke County (home to Athens and the University of Georgia), and DeKalb County voted for a Republican presidential candidate.

Georgia was one of five states, alongside West Virginia, Hawaii, Maryland and Rhode Island, that Reagan lost in 1980 but won in 1984.

== Campaign ==
Jesse Jackson's voters were 92% black, 6% white, 1% Hispanic, and 1% were members of other groups. 48% of Jackson voters listed Mondale as their second candidate in exit polls conducted by CBS News and The New York Times'.

Among white voters, 73% supported Reagan while 27% supported Mondale.

== Results ==
United States presidential election in Georgia, 1984
Party	Candidate	Running mate	Votes	Percentage	Electoral votes
Republican	Ronald Reagan (incumbent)	George H. W. Bush (incumbent)	1,068,722	60.17%	12
Democratic	Walter Mondale	Geraldine Ferraro	706,628	39.79%	0
Write-Ins			743	0.04%	0
Totals			1,776,093	100.0%	12

=== Results by county ===
County	Ronald Reagan Republican		Walter Mondale Democratic		Margin		Total votes cast
County	#	%	#	%	#	%	Total votes cast
Appling	2,929	59.93%	1,958	40.07%	971	19.86%	4,887
Atkinson	944	51.17%	901	48.83%	43	2.34%	1,845
Bacon	1,778	63.77%	1,010	36.23%	768	27.54%	2,788
Baker	675	49.41%	691	50.59%	-16	-1.18%	1,366
Baldwin	5,717	59.74%	3,853	40.26%	1,864	19.48%	9,570
Banks	1,549	59.30%	1,063	40.70%	486	18.60%	2,612
Barrow	4,123	63.53%	2,367	36.47%	1,756	27.06%	6,490
Bartow	7,104	59.78%	4,780	40.22%	2,324	19.56%	11,884
Ben Hill	2,313	55.44%	1,859	44.56%	454	10.88%	4,172
Berrien	2,395	58.92%	1,670	41.08%	725	17.84%	4,065
Bibb	24,170	47.77%	26,427	52.23%	-2,257	-4.46%	50,597
Bleckley	1,912	56.62%	1,465	43.38%	447	13.24%	3,377
Brantley	1,679	52.53%	1,517	47.47%	162	5.06%	3,196
Brooks	2,229	57.30%	1,661	42.70%	568	14.60%	3,890
Bryan	2,265	61.83%	1,398	38.17%	867	23.66%	3,663
Bulloch	6,117	62.67%	3,644	37.33%	2,473	25.34%	9,761
Burke	3,137	50.08%	3,127	49.92%	10	0.16%	6,264
Butts	2,141	54.05%	1,820	45.95%	321	8.10%	3,961
Calhoun	776	41.88%	1,077	58.12%	-301	-16.24%	1,853
Camden	2,841	56.76%	2,164	43.24%	677	13.52%	5,005
Candler	1,497	59.62%	1,014	40.38%	483	19.24%	2,511
Carroll	11,436	67.17%	5,590	32.83%	5,846	34.34%	17,026
Catoosa	7,908	71.91%	3,089	28.09%	4,819	43.82%	10,997
Charlton	1,368	55.18%	1,111	44.82%	257	10.36%	2,479
Chatham	38,482	57.65%	28,271	42.35%	10,211	15.30%	66,753
Chattahoochee	459	51.75%	428	48.25%	31	3.50%	887
Chattooga	2,953	53.41%	2,576	46.59%	377	6.82%	5,529
Cherokee	11,146	76.11%	3,499	23.89%	7,647	52.22%	14,645
Clarke	11,503	53.17%	10,132	46.83%	1,371	6.34%	21,635
Clay	419	35.84%	750	64.16%	-331	-28.32%	1,169
Clayton	31,553	72.84%	11,763	27.16%	19,790	45.68%	43,316
Clinch	862	57.97%	625	42.03%	237	15.94%	1,487
Cobb	97,429	77.42%	28,414	22.58%	69,015	54.84%	125,843
Coffee	4,200	61.47%	2,633	38.53%	1,567	22.94%	6,833
Colquitt	5,815	64.45%	3,208	35.55%	2,607	28.90%	9,023
Columbia	12,294	76.74%	3,727	23.26%	8,567	53.48%	16,021
Cook	1,860	55.19%	1,510	44.81%	350	10.38%	3,370
Coweta	7,981	68.62%	3,650	31.38%	4,331	37.24%	11,631
Crawford	1,298	47.70%	1,423	52.30%	-125	-4.60%	2,721
Crisp	2,895	57.63%	2,128	42.37%	767	15.26%	5,023
Dade	2,750	70.51%	1,150	29.49%	1,600	41.02%	3,900
Dawson	1,322	67.28%	643	32.72%	679	34.56%	1,965
Decatur	4,134	60.88%	2,656	39.12%	1,478	21.76%	6,790
DeKalb	104,697	57.52%	77,329	42.48%	27,368	15.04%	182,026
Dodge	2,765	52.39%	2,513	47.61%	252	4.78%	5,278
Dooly	1,435	45.40%	1,726	54.60%	-291	-9.20%	3,161
Dougherty	16,920	56.73%	12,904	43.27%	4,016	13.46%	29,824
Douglas	12,428	73.98%	4,371	26.02%	8,057	47.96%	16,799
Early	2,239	59.98%	1,494	40.02%	745	19.96%	3,733
Echols	453	66.62%	227	33.38%	226	33.24%	680
Effingham	4,266	67.49%	2,055	32.51%	2,211	34.98%	6,321
Elbert	3,366	55.77%	2,670	44.23%	696	11.54%	6,036
Emanuel	3,920	61.46%	2,458	38.54%	1,462	22.92%	6,378
Evans	1,601	57.30%	1,193	42.70%	408	14.60%	2,794
Fannin	4,159	67.91%	1,965	32.09%	2,194	35.82%	6,124
Fayette	12,575	81.47%	2,861	18.53%	9,714	62.94%	15,436
Floyd	15,437	63.50%	8,873	36.50%	6,564	27.00%	24,310
Forsyth	6,841	75.04%	2,275	24.96%	4,566	50.08%	9,116
Franklin	2,549	58.10%	1,838	41.90%	711	16.20%	4,387
Fulton	95,149	43.11%	125,567	56.89%	-30,418	-13.78%	220,716
Gilmer	2,972	70.66%	1,234	29.34%	1,738	41.32%	4,206
Glascock	827	72.29%	317	27.71%	510	44.58%	1,144
Glynn	11,724	64.07%	6,574	35.93%	5,150	28.14%	18,298
Gordon	5,566	68.10%	2,607	31.90%	2,959	36.20%	8,173
Grady	3,886	63.22%	2,261	36.78%	1,625	26.44%	6,147
Greene	1,599	44.53%	1,992	55.47%	-393	-10.94%	3,591
Gwinnett	54,749	79.48%	14,139	20.52%	40,610	58.96%	68,888
Habersham	4,647	68.62%	2,125	31.38%	2,522	37.24%	6,772
Hall	15,076	67.01%	7,421	32.99%	7,655	34.02%	22,497
Hancock	644	23.39%	2,109	76.61%	-1,465	-53.22%	2,753
Haralson	3,945	67.06%	1,938	32.94%	2,007	34.12%	5,883
Harris	3,138	59.95%	2,096	40.05%	1,042	19.90%	5,234
Hart	2,842	53.24%	2,496	46.76%	346	6.48%	5,338
Heard	1,492	64.81%	810	35.19%	682	29.62%	2,302
Henry	9,142	69.06%	4,096	30.94%	5,046	38.12%	13,238
Houston	14,255	60.71%	9,226	39.29%	5,029	21.42%	23,481
Irwin	1,330	59.51%	905	40.49%	425	19.02%	2,235
Jackson	4,202	60.73%	2,717	39.27%	1,485	21.46%	6,919
Jasper	1,431	56.05%	1,122	43.95%	309	12.10%	2,553
Jeff Davis	2,233	61.80%	1,380	38.20%	853	23.60%	3,613
Jefferson	2,999	51.57%	2,816	48.43%	183	3.14%	5,815
Jenkins	1,399	55.80%	1,108	44.20%	291	11.60%	2,507
Johnson	1,733	59.11%	1,199	40.89%	534	18.22%	2,932
Jones	3,401	55.01%	2,781	44.99%	620	10.02%	6,182
Lamar	2,198	57.80%	1,605	42.20%	593	15.60%	3,803
Lanier	852	53.48%	741	46.52%	111	6.96%	1,593
Laurens	7,181	56.76%	5,471	43.24%	1,710	13.52%	12,652
Lee	2,972	69.83%	1,284	30.17%	1,688	39.66%	4,256
Liberty	3,229	53.53%	2,803	46.47%	426	7.06%	6,032
Lincoln	1,357	54.89%	1,115	45.11%	242	9.78%	2,472
Long	1,099	57.39%	816	42.61%	283	14.78%	1,915
Lowndes	10,437	62.86%	6,167	37.14%	4,270	25.72%	16,604
Lumpkin	1,991	64.21%	1,110	35.79%	881	28.42%	3,101
McDuffie	3,284	62.08%	2,006	37.92%	1,278	24.16%	5,290
McIntosh	1,512	45.71%	1,796	54.29%	-284	-8.58%	3,308
Macon	1,515	37.54%	2,521	62.46%	-1,006	-24.92%	4,036
Madison	3,768	69.04%	1,690	30.96%	2,078	38.08%	5,458
Marion	846	47.08%	951	52.92%	-105	-5.84%	1,797
Meriwether	3,195	52.73%	2,864	47.27%	331	5.46%	6,059
Miller	1,348	71.93%	526	28.07%	822	43.86%	1,874
Mitchell	2,737	49.51%	2,791	50.49%	-54	-0.98%	5,528
Monroe	2,420	52.51%	2,189	47.49%	231	5.02%	4,609
Montgomery	1,365	58.96%	950	41.04%	415	17.92%	2,315
Morgan	2,301	57.31%	1,714	42.69%	587	14.62%	4,015
Murray	3,521	68.10%	1,649	31.90%	1,872	36.20%	5,170
Muscogee	23,816	53.34%	20,835	46.66%	2,981	6.68%	44,651
Newton	5,810	63.16%	3,389	36.84%	2,421	26.32%	9,199
Oconee	3,471	70.29%	1,467	29.71%	2,004	40.58%	4,938
Oglethorpe	2,122	63.15%	1,238	36.85%	884	26.30%	3,360
Paulding	6,048	69.77%	2,621	30.23%	3,427	39.54%	8,669
Peach	2,652	44.05%	3,369	55.95%	-717	-11.90%	6,021
Pickens	2,801	67.82%	1,329	32.18%	1,472	35.64%	4,130
Pierce	1,978	56.86%	1,501	43.14%	477	13.72%	3,479
Pike	1,855	60.66%	1,203	39.34%	652	21.32%	3,058
Polk	5,435	62.49%	3,262	37.51%	2,173	24.98%	8,697
Pulaski	1,509	51.17%	1,440	48.83%	69	2.34%	2,949
Putnam	1,830	57.80%	1,336	42.20%	494	15.60%	3,166
Quitman	361	42.42%	490	57.58%	-129	-15.16%	851
Rabun	2,191	63.36%	1,267	36.64%	924	26.72%	3,458
Randolph	1,578	52.04%	1,454	47.96%	124	4.08%	3,032
Richmond	29,869	58.48%	21,208	41.52%	8,661	16.96%	51,077
Rockdale	10,121	75.46%	3,291	24.54%	6,830	50.92%	13,412
Schley	614	60.37%	403	39.63%	211	20.74%	1,017
Screven	2,583	59.65%	1,747	40.35%	836	19.30%	4,330
Seminole	1,636	54.79%	1,350	45.21%	286	9.58%	2,986
Spalding	8,571	63.73%	4,878	36.27%	3,693	27.46%	13,449
Stephens	4,057	64.10%	2,272	35.90%	1,785	28.20%	6,329
Stewart	805	38.10%	1,308	61.90%	-503	-23.80%	2,113
Sumter	4,607	55.29%	3,725	44.71%	882	10.58%	8,332
Talbot	778	34.24%	1,494	65.76%	-716	-31.52%	2,272
Taliaferro	318	36.64%	550	63.36%	-232	-26.72%	868
Tattnall	3,641	65.08%	1,954	34.92%	1,687	30.16%	5,595
Taylor	1,292	49.09%	1,340	50.91%	-48	-1.82%	2,632
Telfair	1,980	49.14%	2,049	50.86%	-69	-1.72%	4,029
Terrell	1,744	52.18%	1,598	47.82%	146	4.36%	3,342
Thomas	6,427	61.41%	4,039	38.59%	2,388	22.82%	10,466
Tift	4,429	61.81%	2,736	38.19%	1,693	23.62%	7,165
Toombs	4,470	65.21%	2,385	34.79%	2,085	30.42%	6,855
Towns	1,960	66.06%	1,007	33.94%	953	32.12%	2,967
Treutlen	1,086	56.30%	843	43.70%	243	12.60%	1,929
Troup	9,340	63.92%	5,272	36.08%	4,068	27.84%	14,612
Turner	1,329	51.14%	1,270	48.86%	59	2.28%	2,599
Twiggs	1,143	39.44%	1,755	60.56%	-612	-21.12%	2,898
Union	1,914	63.25%	1,112	36.75%	802	26.50%	3,026
Upson	4,803	62.01%	2,943	37.99%	1,860	24.02%	7,746
Walker	10,734	68.22%	5,000	31.78%	5,734	36.44%	15,734
Walton	4,995	66.81%	2,481	33.19%	2,514	33.62%	7,476
Ware	5,547	55.57%	4,435	44.43%	1,112	11.14%	9,982
Warren	1,087	46.35%	1,258	53.65%	-171	-7.30%	2,345
Washington	2,887	48.76%	3,034	51.24%	-147	-2.48%	5,921
Wayne	3,698	60.31%	2,434	39.69%	1,264	20.62%	6,132
Webster	402	42.95%	534	57.05%	-132	-14.10%	936
Wheeler	833	51.84%	774	48.16%	59	3.68%	1,607
White	2,369	68.49%	1,090	31.51%	1,279	36.98%	3,459
Whitfield	11,957	69.35%	5,284	30.65%	6,673	38.70%	17,241
Wilcox	1,218	50.12%	1,212	49.88%	6	0.24%	2,430
Wilkes	1,837	53.67%	1,586	46.33%	251	7.34%	3,423
Wilkinson	1,756	45.52%	2,102	54.48%	-346	-8.96%	3,858
Worth	2,910	63.33%	1,685	36.67%	1,225	26.66%	4,595
Totals	1,068,722	60.17%	706,628	39.79%	362,094	20.38%	1,776,093 (Note: 743 (0.4%) write-in votes were tabulated, but only released as a statewide total and not separated by county.)

==== Counties that flipped from Democratic to Republican ====
- Appling
- Atkinson
- Bacon
- Baldwin
- Banks
- Barrow
- Bartow
- Ben Hill
- Berrien
- Bleckley
- Brantley
- Brooks
- Bryan
- Burke
- Bullock
- Butts
- Camden
- Candler
- Carroll
- Charlton
- Chatham
- Chattahoochee
- Chattooga
- Cherokee
- Clarke
- Clinch
- Coffee
- Colquitt
- Cook
- Coweta
- Crisp
- Dawson
- Decatur
- Dodge
- DeKalb
- Dougherty
- Early
- Echols
- Effingham
- Elbert
- Emanuel
- Evans
- Floyd
- Forsyth
- Franklin
- Gilmer
- Glascock
- Glynn
- Gordon
- Grady
- Habersham
- Hall
- Haralson
- Harris
- Hart
- Heard
- Henry
- Houston
- Irwin
- Jackson
- Jasper
- Jeff Davis
- Jefferson
- Jenkins
- Johnson
- Jones
- Lamar
- Lanier
- Laurens
- Liberty
- Lincoln
- Long
- Lumpkin
- McDuffie
- Madison
- Meriwether
- Miller
- Monroe
- Montgomery
- Morgan
- Murray
- Muscogee
- Newton
- Oconee
- Oglethorpe
- Paulding
- Pickens
- Pierce
- Pike
- Polk
- Pulaski
- Putnam
- Rabun
- Randolph
- Richmond
- Schley
- Screven
- Seminole
- Spalding
- Stephens
- Sumter
- Tattnall
- Terrell
- Thomas
- Tift
- Toombs
- Towns
- Treutlen
- Troup
- Turner
- Union
- Upson
- Walton
- Ware
- Wayne
- Wheeler
- White
- Whitfield
- Wilcox
- Wilkes
- Worth

=== Results by congressional district ===
Reagan won 9 out of Georgia's 10 Congressional Districts, including 7 that elected Democrats.

District	Reagan	Mondale	Representative
1st	59%	41%	Lindsay Thomas
2nd	58%	42%	Charles Hatcher
3rd	55%	45%	Richard Ray
4th	66%	34%	Elliott H. Levitas
4th	66%	34%	Pat Swindall
5th	33%	67%	Wyche Fowler
6th	77%	23%	Newt Gingrich
7th	73%	27%	George Darden
8th	52%	48%	J. Roy Rowland
9th	69%	31%	Ed Jenkins
10th	65%	35%	Doug Barnard Jr.

== See also ==
- Presidency of Ronald Reagan

== Works cited ==
- Black, Earl; Black, Merle (1992). The Vital South: How Presidents Are Elected. Harvard University Press. ISBN 0674941306.
- Ranney, Austin, ed. (1985). The American Elections of 1984. Duke University Press. ISBN 0822302306.
