= Brave: Shaman's Challenge =

- North American box art
- Developer(s): Collision Studios
- Publisher(s): SouthPeak Games
- Platform(s): Nintendo DS
- Release: NA: Cancelled; EU: Cancelled
- Genre(s): Puzzle video game
- Mode(s): Single-player

Brave: Shaman's Challenge is a puzzle video game by American developer Collision Studios that was planned for release for the Nintendo DS in North America and PAL regions in early 2009. The game is a spin-off of the PlayStation 2 platformer Brave: The Search for Spirit Dancer. Brave, the main character, has to use quick thinking and magic spells to battle Shamans terrorizing him in his dreams. The game was however cancelled.
