= Section 8: Prejudice =

2011 video game

- Developer: TimeGate Studios
- Publishers: TimeGate Studios; Atari (PC)
- Director: Alan B. Chaveleh
- Producer: Tom Ashley
- Designer: Keith Turkowski
- Programmer: Alina Easterday Callahan
- Artist: Zachary Forcher
- Writer: William J. Coakley
- Composers: Cris Velasco; Jason Graves
- Engine: Unreal Engine 3
- Platforms: Microsoft Windows, PlayStation 3, Xbox 360
- Release: Xbox 360 (XBLA); April 20, 2011; Microsoft Windows (GFWL); May 4, 2011; PlayStation 3 (PSN): NA: July 26, 2011; PAL: August 3, 2011
- Genre: First-person shooter
- Modes: Single-player, multiplayer

Section 8: Prejudice is a science fiction, first-person shooter video game developed by TimeGate Studios. It is the direct sequel to the 2009 game Section 8. Unlike its predecessor, Prejudice is a digital download-only title, and contains more content than the previous game. It was released for Xbox 360, Microsoft Windows, and PlayStation 3 between April and August 2011.

The game features a single player campaign and several multiplayer modes. In its multiplayer games teams compete to control points and complete a range of mission objectives to gain victory.

== Plot ==
The single-player campaign explores the conflict between the 8th Armored Infantry and the Arm of Orion. The player again takes control of Alex Corde, the protagonist of the first game, who must complete eight objective-based missions taking place in four different environments.

== Gameplay ==
Screenshot showing mini-map in bottom left and machine gun reloading

Like its predecessor, the characters in Section 8: Prejudice wear powered armor suits. The player can use "overdrive" to move horizontally at superhuman speeds, or activate their jet pack to achieve new heights. Instead of having fixed spawn points, the player chooses where to "drop in" and their character is subsequently launched into the battlefield from orbital dropships that are 15,000 feet above the surface. While burning in, the player character can be attacked by enemy players and anti-air turrets, but the dropping player can instantly kill another player by landing directly on them.

In multiplayer, players are encouraged to work in teams to achieve objectives and defend one another. They may purchase the following defensive structures: Mini-Gun Turrets, Rocket Turrets, Anti-Air Turrets, Supply Depots, and Sensor Arrays, to protect friendly-controlled objectives. Players may also purchase a tank, a bike, and a mech. Players are able to purchase these using "Requisition Points" which are awarded to the player for various feats they perform through play.

Players are also able to choose their primary and secondary weapons, such as assault rifles, pistols, machine guns, shotguns, pulse cannons, and sniper rifles, as well as grenades, explosives, knives, mortar launchers and engineering tools. The player is also able to create their own player class through various stackable modules that determine the player's speed, stealth, or the regeneration of the limited-use jetpack.

=== Multiplayer ===
Section 8: Prejudice has four multiplayer game modes, Conquest, Swarm, Assault, and Skirmish. Conquest is a multiplayer game mode where two teams compete to capture Control Points, complete DCMs, and Destroy enemy players. The team that reaches the score limit first or has the highest score at the end of regulation time wins the match. Players can compete in Conquest mode with up to 32 players on the Xbox 360 and PlayStation 3 or up to 40 players on the PC. Swarm mode is a co-op multiplayer mode where four players defend a single Control Point against waves of attacking enemy bots and try to prevent the Control Point from being captured for 15 minutes. Every five minutes in Swarm, players are rewarded with an Airstrike that eliminates all enemy bots on the battlefield. A new multiplayer game mode, Assault, was released to the public in May 2011. Assault mode is made up of the two warring factions. One team takes on the role of the Defenders, whilst the other team is the Attackers. The Attackers have to capture all of the Defenders Control Points within ten minutes. Once the Attackers have captured a control point, it cannot be taken back by the defenders. Once there is one Control Point left, the game goes into sudden death mode during which neither team's players can re-spawn after being killed. If the Attackers capture all of the control points within ten minutes, the time it took them to capture the Control Points will be the new time limit, and the teams switch sides. The defenders spawn early with a sum of Requisition points to fortify their bases. Skirmish multiplayer mode was released in July 2011. Skirmish is a type of team deathmatch and is similar to Conquest mode, but without the ability to capture control points.

Like the original Section 8, Section 8: Prejudice supports dedicated servers for Xbox 360. TimeGate made a partnership with GameServers.com to provide dedicated server rentals for fans.

== Development ==
Including testers, the development team consisted of about 80 developers who took about 18 months to complete work on the game. The game was intended to be a full-priced, but while under development TimeGate Studios decided the game would be self-published and distributed digitally, allowing for a lower price point with the potential to gain a larger audience. The low price was planned to entice impulse purchases.

Section 8: Prejudice uses the Unreal Engine 3 game engine. The art direction was influenced by the films Aliens and Final Fantasy: The Spirits Within. The developers choose to implement the drop in feature for players and objects such as turrets. Because players are able to drop in anywhere on a map, the level design had to be paid particular attention. The developers also listened to critics of the first Section 8 title and ensured that gameplay issues were addressed.

== Reception ==
Reception

Aggregate score
Aggregator	Score		
Aggregator	PC	PS3	Xbox 360
Metacritic	77/100	70/100	76/100

Review scores
Publication	Score		
Publication	PC	PS3	Xbox 360
Destructoid	N/A	N/A	7.5/10
Edge	N/A	N/A	6/10
Eurogamer	N/A	N/A	9/10
Game Informer	8/10	N/A	8/10
GamePro	4.5/5	N/A	4.5/5
GameSpot	7.5/10	7.5/10	7.5/10
GameTrailers	N/A	N/A	8/10
IGN	6/10	6/10	6/10
Joystiq	N/A	N/A	4/5
Official Xbox Magazine (US)	N/A	N/A	8/10
PC Gamer (US)	80%	N/A	N/A
PlayStation: The Official Magazine	N/A	8/10	N/A
The Daily Telegraph	N/A	N/A	8/10
The Escapist	N/A	N/A	4/5

The PC and Xbox 360 versions of Section 8: Prejudice received "generally favorable reviews", while the PlayStation 3 version received "average" reviews, according to the review aggregation website Metacritic.

IGN cited a plentiful amount of content but poor execution.

== Cancelled sequel ==
A sequel was planned, but due to the development of Aliens: Colonial Marines, TimeGate shifted their focus. In addition, the company was shut down after declaring for Chapter 7 bankruptcy protection, owing US$10 – 50 million, thus resulting in the cancellation of the next title.

== See also ==
- List of first-person shooters
