= Dark Side of the Moon: A Sci-Fi Adventure =

1998 video game

- Developer: SouthPeak Interactive
- Publisher: SouthPeak Interactive
- Director: Edward Bowen
- Writers: Lee Sheldon; Mark L. Barrett
- Engine: Video Reality
- Platform: Windows 95/98
- Release: NA: November 17, 1998
- Genre: Adventure
- Mode: Single player

Dark Side of the Moon is a 1998 graphic adventure game developed and published by SouthPeak Interactive.

== Plot ==
Dark Side of the Moon follows the story of Jake Wright, who inherits the mineral rights to the planet Luna Crysta after his uncle dies suspiciously.

== Development ==
The game was developed and published by SouthPeak Interactive. The game is powered with SouthPeak Interactive's Video Reality engine, which had previously appeared in Temüjin. Dark Side of the Moon was led by Lee Sheldon, who had previously developed the adventure game Ripley's Believe It or Not!: The Riddle of Master Lu. While he had been involved in Temüjin, Sheldon was dissatisfied with the project. Dark Side of the Moon utilizes full-motion video footage of live actors, but the game's backgrounds are almost entirely pre-rendered. According to art director Paul Graham, the game required "500,000 hours of rendering", which was carried out by a render farm of 220 computers.

In September 1998, SouthPeak partnered with Activision to distribute three games, including Dark Side of the Moon, outside United States and Canada.

== Reception ==
Reception

Aggregate score
Aggregator	Score
GameRankings	69%

Review scores
Publication	Score
Adventure Gamers	4/5
AllGame	3.5/5
Computer Games Strategy Plus	3.5/5
GameSpot	6.7/10
GameStar	36%
Next Generation	2/5
PC Gamer (US)	90%
PC Games (DE)	46%
PC PowerPlay	47%
The Electric Playground	7/10

The game received average reviews according to the review aggregation website GameRankings. Next Generation said of the game, "It's not bad for an adventure game with FMV, but that really isn't saying much."

Dark Side of the Moon was a finalist for the AIAS' "PC Adventure Game of the Year" during the 2nd Annual Interactive Achievement Awards, which was ultimately given to Grim Fandango.
