= Juka and the Monophonic Menace =

2005 video game

- Developers: Orbital Media, Inc.
- Publishers: PAL: Zoo Digital Publishing; NA: SouthPeak Interactive
- Composer: Jake Kaufman
- Platform: Game Boy Advance
- Release: PAL: November 4, 2005; NA: October 24, 2006
- Genre: Action-adventure
- Mode: Single-player

Juka and the Monophonic Menace is an action-adventure video game published and developed by Orbital Media, Inc. in PAL regions, and published by SouthPeak Interactive in NA. It was slated for release on the Nintendo DS, but it was ultimately canceled.

== Plot ==
Juka is a young alchemist in the world of Obla. He goes on adventure to save his village from the Monophonic Menace.

== Trivia ==
- A bug in this game is present in the PAL version of the game, where defeating Frostinator is impossible due to him not spawning one of the needed enemies to kill him. It was fixed in the NA release that was released the next year.

== Reception ==
Reception

Aggregate score
| Aggregator | Score |
|---|---|
| Metacritic | 66/100 |

Review scores
| Publication | Score |
|---|---|
| AllGame | 2.5/5 |
| GameSpot | 6.3/10 |
| GameZone | 7.7/10 |
| IGN | 8/10 |
| Nintendo Power | 5/10 |
| Nintendo World Report | 6.5/10 |

The game received "average" reviews according to the review aggregation website Metacritic. IGN said: "Orbital Media has given everyone a really solid adventure game that uses some rather interesting techniques for battle." GameSpot said: "There are dozens of role-playing games available for the Game Boy Advance [...] Juka and the Monophonic Menace is one of the simpler games." They further commented that "As such, it's a good way to introduce younger or inexperienced players to the genre." Nintendo Power gave the game a score of five out of ten, over a year before its U.S. release.
