= The Dukes of Hazzard: Racing for Home =

1999 video game

- North American PlayStation cover art
- Developers: Sinister Games (PS, PC); Spellbound (GBC)
- Publishers: NA: SouthPeak Interactive; EU: Ubi Soft
- Series: The Dukes of Hazzard
- Platforms: Game Boy Color, Microsoft Windows, PlayStation
- Release: PlayStation: NA: December 1, 1999; EU: 2000; Windows: EU: June 30, 2000; NA: October 10, 2000; Game Boy Color: NA: November 7, 2000; EU: 2000
- Genre: Racing
- Modes: Single-player, multiplayer

The Dukes of Hazzard: Racing for Home is a racing video game published by SouthPeak Interactive that was released for the PlayStation in 1999. The game was later released for Game Boy Color and Microsoft Windows in 2000. It is based on the television show, The Dukes of Hazzard. Waylon Jennings, James Best, Ben Jones, Sonny Shroyer, and Tom Wopat reprised their characters by providing their voices to the PC and PlayStation versions of the game. A sequel titled The Dukes of Hazzard II: Daisy Dukes It Out was released in 2000.

== Gameplay ==
The player plays as Bo and Luke Duke who is racing to pay off the Duke farm. The player must play through missions that include Bo and Luke outrunning Rosco, Cletus and Enos, and saving their cousin Daisy Duke from Black Jack Perril who wants revenge on their uncle Jesse Duke for not helping him run moonshine back in their younger days and causing Black Jack to be sentenced to prison.

== Reception ==
Reception

Aggregate score
Aggregator	Score		
Aggregator	GBC	PC	PS
GameRankings	80%	40%	58%

Review scores
Publication	Score		
Publication	GBC	PC	PS
CNET Gamecenter	N/A	3/10	6/10
Computer Gaming World	N/A	1/5	N/A
Electronic Gaming Monthly	N/A	N/A	4.5/10
EP Daily	N/A	N/A	3.5/10
Eurogamer	N/A	4/10	3/10
Game Informer	N/A	N/A	6/10
GameFan	N/A	N/A	(J.W.) 70% 66% (Note: In GameFan's viewpoint of the PlayStation version, three critics gave it each a score of 85, 52, and 60.)
GameRevolution	N/A	N/A	D
GameSpot	N/A	4.6/10	4.9/10
IGN	7/10	5.8/10	6/10
Next Generation	N/A	1/5	2/5
Nintendo Power	4/5	N/A	N/A
Official U.S. PlayStation Magazine	N/A	N/A	1.5/5
PC Gamer (US)	N/A	45%	N/A

The Game Boy Color version received "favorable" reviews, and the PlayStation version received "mixed" reviews, while the PC version received "unfavorable" reviews, according to video game review aggregator GameRankings.

Chris Carle of IGN said of the PlayStation version, "The missions can get tedious, even though some are truly challenging. The stunt physics are fun and the various vehicles are a hoot. All in all, it is a decent ride while it lasts." Carle also criticized the game's cutscenes: "The characters look downright goofy. Uncle Jesse resembles Dr. Zaius from Planet of the Apes and Luke Duke could easily be on display at your local zoo."

Scott Steinberg of the same website praised the PC version's three multiplayer modes, but also said, "It's hard to decide which is worse, primitive 3D visuals, ugly ass rendered movies or the non-interactive backgrounds. Thank heaven the vehicle models don't suck." He also praised the soundtrack, voice-overs and Waylon Jennings' narration, but criticized the game's sound effects, as well as the gameplay, stating that the General Lee "turns like a concrete mixer. If you can keep it in a straight line for more than fifteen seconds, you might enjoy the varied styles of play."

Craig Harris said of the Game Boy Color version, "The graphics [...] are downright hideous. Everything about the imagery -- cars, land texture, buildings, cutscene characters -- have an ugly, dithered and blocky construction, and it makes the game that much more difficult to look at when driving around Hazzard County. [...] The game doesn't offer anything more than just driving levels, but the missions vary enough to continue through the adventure to the very end of the tale in Hazzard County."

Adam Pavlacka of NextGen's April 2000 issue called the PlayStation version "A mediocre racing game that survives on the license alone. Barely." Eight issues later, Kevin Rice called the PC version "Just a bad ol' game, never meanin' no harm, but with gameplay like this, it winds up doing plenty."

The D-Pad Destroyer of GamePro said of the PlayStation version in one review, "Fans of the Dukes will get into this game just because they get to drive the General Lee and outmaneuver Roscoe and Cletus. Others should give the game a rent first, because the sub-par graphics and the funky controls will turn off most hardcore driving-game fans. Racing For Home just doesn't beat all you ever saw." (Note: GamePro gave the PlayStation version two 3.5/5 scores for graphics and control, 4.5/5 for sound, and 4/5 for overall fun factor in one review.) In another GamePro review, Four-Eyed Dragon said of the same console version, "even with lackluster graphics, Dukes of Hazzard maintains a fun pace. Duke [sic] fans will enjoy the fond memories, while young drivers will get caught up in the simple but well-paced gameplay." (Note: GamePro gave the PlayStation version 3.5/5 for graphics, 5/5 for sound, and two 4.5/5 scores for control and fun factor in another review.) However, GameZone gave the PC version five out of ten, saying, "There is some fun to be had watching the cut-scenes, which are just as poorly acted as their syndicated inspiration. Outside of that, I find it very hard to recommend this game to anyone other than racing fans who still own their Dukes of Hazzard Underoos. The rest of you should steer clear. (No pun intended.)"

One AllGame review gave the PlayStation version three-and-a-half stars out of five, saying that it "definitely brought to fore my inner 11-year-old." Later, in another AllGame review, Anthony Baize gave the PC version a similar score of three-and-a-half stars out of five, calling it "a great game for gamers wanting to drive a fast car and use their brains at the same time. Fans of the television series will love the animated interludes and the cast of characters will most likely amuse players who have never seen the TV program. This is a solid title that won't disappoint fans of the genre."

By May 2000, The Dukes of Hazzard: Racing for Home sold more than 400,000 units. (Note: other sources say 500,000 units by that point)
