= Scurge: Hive =

2006 action-adventure video game

- Nintendo DS cover art
- Developer: Orbital Media
- Publisher: SouthPeak Interactive
- Designers: Graham Scott, Daniel Kratt, Steve Shatford
- Composer: Jake Kaufman
- Platforms: Game Boy Advance, Nintendo DS
- Release: NA: October 24, 2006; EU: November 3, 2006; Console and PC; 2025
- Genres: Action-adventure, metroidvania
- Modes: Single-player, multiplayer

Scurge: Hive is an action-adventure video game by Orbital Media released for the Game Boy Advance and Nintendo DS in 2006. The game follows the protagonist Jenosa Arma, a bounty huntress tasked with hunting a parasitic lifeform called the "Scurge" an alien entity capable of rapidly adapting to and infecting biological, mechanical, and digital systems, including the player. Throughout the game, Jenosa Arma will have to battle various forms of the Scurge virus and race against the clock as the parasite slowly takes over Jenosa's body. The gameplay takes place in an isometric perspective.

In 2025, ahead of the game's twentieth anniversary, it was announced Scurge would be ported to eighth and ninth-generation consoles and Microsoft Windows within that year, with additional features.

== Plot ==
The story of Scurge: Hive follows Jenosa Arma, who has been contracted by the military on a rescue and salvage mission to Confederation Research Lab 58 on planet Inos. The perpetrator of the disaster is a virulent organism known as "Scurge", a parasite which has the ability to transform various organisms and technologies into Scurge derivatives. Jenosa has been equipped with a suit that resists infection. Unfortunately, it can only slow the infection down rather than make her immune; she is infected with Scurge the moment she first encounters it. The story establishes an atmosphere that is highly detailed for a portable game. The ending leaves the door open for a sequel.

== Gameplay ==
Example of gameplay, taken on the GBA version of the video game

Scurge: Hive is an action-adventure game that incorporates elements of many different games; Scurge emphasizes platforming elements, though the game's isometric vantage point makes jumps difficult to align. In addition to Jenosa's standard jump move, she can also attach a mechanical tether to a hook and swing longer distances, jump in mid air and grab onto horizontal pipes and ledges. The game's upgrade system allows the player to progressively open up more of the game world. Scattered throughout are simple puzzles.

The game's isometric perspective and the inability to run while shooting puts the emphasis on aiming and risk-taking. Combat makes use of a rock-paper-scissors system, where a weapon will deal more damage to one type of enemy and powers up another. Jenosa will receive three elemental weapons: electromagnetic pulse, combustion and dissipate. EMP does more damage against mechanical enemies but increases the power of energy-based enemies; combustion works well against biological enemies but increases the strength of mechanical foes; dissipate effectively destroys energy foes but gives additional power to biological adversaries. Scurge: Hive frequently throws multiple enemies of different kinds at the player, forcing difficult decisions about which weapon to use.

Tying the game together is the game's infection meter. When the meter reaches 100%, Jenosa's health deteriorates rapidly. When her health reaches zero, whether through injury and/or infection, she becomes a Scurge host and the game ends. There are various cleansing stations (which also act as the game's save points) scattered about the game world that heal Jenosa. The result quickens the pace of the game.

== Reception ==
Reception

Aggregate score
Aggregator	Score	
Aggregator	DS	GBA
Metacritic	70/100	76/100

Review scores
Publication	Score	
Publication	DS	GBA
1Up.com	B−	N/A
Edge	4/10	N/A
Electronic Gaming Monthly	6.5/10	N/A
Eurogamer	6/10	N/A
Game Informer	7.5/10	N/A
GameRevolution	C+	N/A
GameSpot	7.7/10	7.8/10
GameSpy	3/5	3/5
GameZone	8/10	N/A
IGN	7/10	8/10

The Game Boy Advance version received "generally favorable reviews", while the DS version received "average" reviews, according to the review aggregation website Metacritic.
