= TimeGate Studios =

American video game developer

- Type: Private
- Industry: Video game development
- Founded: August 1998
- Defunct: 2013
- Fate: Chapter 7 bankruptcy
- Headquarters: Sugar Land, Texas, United States
- Key people: Adel Chaveleh, president Alan Chaveleh, chairman
- Products: Kohan series Axis & Allies; Section 8 series
- Number of employees: 55
- Website: timegate.com

TimeGate Studios was an American video game developer based in Sugar Land, Texas. Founded in 1998, the company released eight games before closing in 2013.

== History ==
TimeGate Studios was founded in 1998 by Alan and Adel Chaveleh, who respectively served as chairman and president of the studio. The company had worked with industry publishers such as Vivendi Games, Take-Two Interactive, Atari, Ubisoft, SouthPeak Games, and Gamecock Media Group.

=== Releases ===
TimeGate Studios' debut real-time strategy game, Kohan: Immortal Sovereigns, received several awards including "Strategy Game of the Year" in 2001 by Computer Gaming World, PC Gamer, and Computer Games Magazine. The standalone expansion pack, Kohan: Ahriman's Gift, was released later that year and the company's relative success with the Kohan franchise earned it a nomination for “Rookie Studio of the Year” from the IGDA in 2001.

The studio released an addition to the Kohan series in September 2004 with the release of Kohan II: Kings of War, which was featured as a "Top 10 Game" in 2004 by Computer Games Magazine. In November 2004, TimeGate Studios and Atari released Axis & Allies, a real-time strategy game, based on the board game series of the same name, that let players play the role of World War II’s different factions. This title is currently TimeGate's best-selling release to date.

The studio then began to develop in the genre of first-person shooters in October 2006 with the release of F.E.A.R. Extraction Point, an expansion pack for Vivendi’s horror game F.E.A.R (First Encounter Assault Recon.) F.E.A.R. Extraction Point was named "Best Expansion Pack of 2006" by PC Gamer. TimeGate Studios further propelled the F.E.A.R. series on the PC with the release of F.E.A.R. Perseus Mandate in November 2007. The company released F.E.A.R. Files, a combination of both expansion packs, for the Xbox 360 in November 2007 as well.

The studio then began production on Section 8, a sci-fi first-person shooter that was released on the Xbox 360 and PC in September 2009. Several months later, TimeGate released Section 8 on the PlayStation 3 in March 2010. Further sequels were hinted upon by TimeGate, stating in 2010, "...it has never been our intent for it to be a one-product franchise," in reference to Section 8. On April 20, 2011, TimeGate released a digital downloadable sequel to the game titled Section 8: Prejudice.

In late 2012, TimeGate were involved in the development of the much-hyped science-fiction first-person shooter, Aliens: Colonial Marines. The game was outsourced to TimeGate by Borderlands developer Gearbox Software, who were originally assigned by publisher Sega to work on the Alien game. However, due to troubled development, the game was released in a rushed, incomplete state and received mostly negative reviews. Most issues were resolved with a post-release patch. Nevertheless, the state of the game upon initial release led to TimeGate laying off 25 members of its staff after its release.

In 2013, it was announced that TimeGate was developing a new free-to-play game, titled Minimum, expected to be released at the end of the year.

=== Bankruptcy ===
On Wednesday, May 1, 2013, TimeGate Studios filed a petition for Chapter 11 bankruptcy protection in Texas Southern Bankruptcy Court, according to court documents obtained by Polygon. The petition filed by TimeGate listed total liabilities that ranged from $10 to $50 million, owed to creditors. Creditors included companies such as Unreal Engine developer Epic Games, online game service Agora Games, transmedia developer DJ2 Entertainment, video game agency Birthplace Management Group, and video game publisher Southpeak Interactive. TimeGate Studios faced $7.35 million in damages and lost the license for Section 8 as part of a fraud suit between itself and SouthPeak.

In 2009, TimeGate sued Southpeak, claiming Southpeak had withheld royalties and failed to follow through with localizing Section 8. SouthPeak countersued, claiming TimeGate had not invested enough of its own capital into the game's development, among other complaints. The two entered into arbitration with a third party, who ruled in favor of SouthPeak, awarding SouthPeak $7.35 million in compensatory damages and control of the Section 8 license. In March 2013, this ruling was overturned in a federal court. In April 2013, a U.S. Court of Appeals for the Fifth Circuit filed to reverse and remand the prior March ruling, reinstating the arbitration award for SouthPeak. SouthPeak looked to convert TimeGate's Chapter 11 bankruptcy into a Chapter 7 liquidation, which would mean a studio closure for TimeGate. It was reported later in May that the studio had closed.

== Games ==
- Kohan: Immortal Sovereigns (2001)
- Kohan: Ahriman's Gift (2001)
- Kohan II: Kings of War (2004)
- Axis & Allies (2004)
- F.E.A.R. Extraction Point (2006)
- F.E.A.R. Perseus Mandate (2007)
- F.E.A.R. Files (2007)
- Section 8 (2009)
- Section 8: Prejudice (2011)
- Aliens: Colonial Marines (2013)
