= Raven Squad: Operation Hidden Dagger =

2009 video game

- European box art
- Developer(s): Atomic Motion
- Publisher(s): Evolved Games; SouthPeak Games
- Platform(s): Microsoft Windows, Xbox 360
- Release: NA: August 25, 2009; EU: September 18, 2009
- Genre(s): Real-time strategy First-person shooter
- Mode(s): Single-player, Multiplayer

Raven Squad: Operation Hidden Dagger is a real time strategy and tactical first person shooter. It is developed by Hungarian studio Atomic Motion and published by Evolved Games and SouthPeak Games. Raven Squad puts players in control of two groups of mercenary squads who have crash landed behind enemy lines in the Amazonian jungles. Each squad member has different skills which the player must use.

== Gameplay and plot ==
The game takes place in the year 2011. A plane has crashed in the middle of the Amazon rainforest. Raven Squad was sent there to retrieve the info the plane was carrying. As one of the six squad members, the player must use a combination of first-person shooter and real-time strategy elements to complete their mission.

== Reception ==
Raven Squad received poor reviews averaging a 40.24% on GameRankings. 3xGamer issued a poor rating of 1.5 out of 5 stars due to frustrating gameplay.
