= Roogoo Attack =

2009 video game

- North American cover art
- Developer: SpiderMonk Entertainment
- Publisher: SouthPeak Games
- Platform: Nintendo DS
- Release: NA: June 16, 2009; PAL: July 10, 2009
- Genre: Puzzle-platform
- Modes: Single-player, multiplayer

Roogoo Attack is a puzzle-platform game for the Nintendo DS, developed by American studio Spidermonk Entertainment, published by SouthPeak Games and released on June 16, 2009. The game is based on Roogoo, an Xbox 360 puzzle game available for download through the Xbox Live Arcade that was later made available for Windows. The game's release will coincide with the release of Roogoo Twisted Towers for the Wii. The two games offer unlockable stages when connected to each other wirelessly.

== Development ==
Roogoo Attack was announced on February 2, 2009, with a hands-on demo being made available on February 6–8 at the 2009 New York Comic Con. The split-screen race multiplayer mode for the DS version was unveiled in April 2009. In this mode, up to four players compete to finish a stage in the shortest amount of time. Information on three of the environments encountered in the game was released on June 11, 2009.
