= SouthPeak Games =

American video game publisher

SouthPeak Interactive Corporation
- Trade name: SouthPeak Games
- Formerly: SouthPeak Interactive LLC; (1996–2000); SouthPeak Interactive, L.L.C.; (2000–2008)
- Type: Public
- Traded as: Grey Market: SOPK
- Industry: Video games
- Founded: March 1, 1996; 30 years ago in Cary, North Carolina, U.S.
- Defunct: July 2013
- Fate: Encountered lawsuits and a lack of funding
- Headquarters: Midlothian, Virginia, U.S.
- Area served: North America
- Key people: Melanie Mroz (president, CEO); Terry Phillips (chairman); Reba McDermott (CFO)
- Parent: SAS Institute; (1996–2000); Terry Phillips Sales, Inc.; (2000–2008)
- Subsidiaries: 7Sixty; Gamecock Media Group

SouthPeak Interactive Corporation, doing business as SouthPeak Games, was an American video game publisher based in Midlothian, Virginia. Founded on March 1, 1996, as a subsidiary of SAS Institute in Cary, North Carolina, it was sold and moved to Midlothian, Virginia in 2000, and became a public company in 2008. Also in 2008, the company acquired and closed Austin, Texas–based publisher Gamecock Media Group, and opened a separate digital distribution subsidiary 7Sixty in Grapevine, Texas in 2011. SouthPeak Games quietly disappeared from the public eye in July 2013.

== History ==
=== Foundation and sale (1996–2005) ===
SouthPeak Games was founded as SouthPeak Interactive LLC on March 1, 1996, as a subsidiary of SAS Institute. Both companies were headquartered in Cary, North Carolina. SAS Institute's executive vice-president and chief technology officer, Armistead Sapp, was appointed as the new company's president. In 1997, SouthPeak Games signed a deal with Red Storm Entertainment that would grant them the exclusive license to distribute all of their upcoming titles, but this was terminated by Red Storm in April 2000. In March 1999, SouthPeak Games acquired the license to develop games based on the Wild Wild West film. Starting from September 27, 1999, Raleigh, North Carolina–based creative shop Front Door acquired advertisement production rights for games published by SouthPeak for US$8 million. In December 1999, SouthPeak entered into a deal with French publisher Ubi Soft to secure distribution rights to their PC titles in Europe and Québec, and for their console titles in Europe and Australia. On October 16, 2000, SAS Institute sold SouthPeak Games to Midlothian, Virginia–based privately held company Terry Phillips Sales, Inc., owned by brothers Terry Marshall Phillips and Gregory Robert Phillips, for US$4.5 million, making Terry Phillips the new director of SouthPeak Games. As result of the sale, all assets related to SouthPeak Games were moved the Midlothian location, while all staff at the Cary location were laid off or re-employed directly by SAS Institute. The company in its new location was legally registered as SouthPeak Interactive, L.L.C. on October 19, 2000. In August 2005, Melanie Mroz was appointed executive vice-president of SouthPeak Games.

=== Acquisitions (2005–2009) ===
On January 16, 2008, SouthPeak Games acquired public company Global Services Partners Acquisition Corp. (GSPAC), a company intentionally created as a blank check to "consummate a business combination", for US$31 million. Through that transaction, SouthPeak Games performed a reverse merger takeover, and thus merged itself into GSPAC to form a new public entity titled SouthPeak Interactive Corporation, with Mroz becoming president and chief executive officer, and Phillips becoming chairman. On June 19, 2008, the company announced that they had raised a total of US$12.9 million through private investment in public equity, in order to expand its business. On October 14, 2008, the company announced that it had acquired Austin, Texas–based video game publisher Gamecock Media Group, including its upcoming titles, Legendary, Mushroom Men, and Velvet Assassin. Gamecock Media Group was initially made a publishing subsidiary, however, it was closed shortly after. In August 2009, SouthPeak Games started facing legal issues with work-for-hire vendors who had worked on games published by Gamecock Media Group, accusing SouthPeak Games of not paying outstanding royalties, although SouthPeak Games had already acknowledged these issues when they acquired Gamecock Media Group.

When SouthPeak Games released their 2009 Q1 quarterly report on November 13, 2009, it was revealed that, after American video game developer and publisher Midway Games filed for Chapter 11 bankruptcy in February 2009, SouthPeak Games had acquired the exclusive rights to publishing video games based on the TNA Impact! television program for US$100,000, however, they could not agree with Total Nonstop Action Wrestling upon any further titles to be developed.

=== Lawsuits (2009–2011) ===
In December 2009, TimeGate Studios, the developer of Section 8, which was to be published by Gamecock Media Group before their acquisition, sued SouthPeak Games over breach of contract, accusing them of withholding 24 outstanding milestone payments with a sum of around US$6.2 million, in addition to royalty payments for the development of Section 8. In response, SouthPeak Games filed a counterclaim against TimeGate Studios, stating that they willingly shipped a game of poor quality in order to negatively manipulated the product's sales, seeking US$7.3 million in damages. In November 2011, arbitrator Peter Vogel ruled in favor of SouthPeak Games, ordering TimeGates Studios to pay the US$7.3 million and hand over the license to the Section 8 intellectual property to SouthPeak Games, which was, however, overturned by a federal court in March 2012, claiming that the original contract foresaw that TimeGate Studios would retain the Section 8 license in the publishing deal. Regardless, in April 2013, the United States courts of appeals closed the lawsuit in favor of SouthPeak Games, forcing TimeGate Studios to pay a total of US$7.35 million in damages, and again pass the Section 8 license to SouthPeak Games.

In November 2009, SouthPeak Games lost a legal battle to German distributor CDV Software, which concerned the failure to deliver three out of four unspecified games before Christmas 2008, and was ordered to pay US$3.1 million. Additionally, on February 19, 2010, the judge ruled upon CDV Software's other claims, including copyright infringement and breach of contract, ordering SouthPeak Games to hand in further, undisclosed payments. Mid-issue, on April 8, 2010, Reba McDermott was appointed chief financial officer, replacing Melanie Mroz, who previously served that role interimly, but saw her appointment terminated nine months later. As a result of the outstanding bills, on July 20, 2010, British distributor Centresoft put 40,000 units of SouthPeak Games stock on ice to auction them off, generating £50,000 by August 6, 2010. The legal issue was announced to be resolved on October 14, 2010, and CDV Software dropped all charges against SouthPeak Games on November 10, 2010. However, all payments ordered by the settlement court were not paid by SouthPeak Games, as a result of which CDV Software filed for preliminary insolvency on April 15, 2010.

In June 2010, American publisher Majesco announced the upcoming release of My Baby 3 & Friends, the third entry in the My Baby franchise, of which the first two were published by SouthPeak Games. In response to the announcement, on July 21, 2010, SouthPeak Games sued Majesco over copyright infringement over the My Baby intellectual property, despite its developer, French studio Nobilis, actually owning it at the time. Five days later, on July 26, 2010, Nobilis responded to the accusation, citing SouthPeak Games' failure to pay royalties as reason to switch to Majesco and cease operations with SouthPeak Games. Due to damages caused by the legal issue, SouthPeak Games halted the distribution of all released titles in the My Baby series, namely, My Baby Boy, My Baby Girl, and My Baby First Steps on October 13, 2010. It was reported on January 10, 2011, that SouthPeak Games had won against Majesco and Nobilis, with the Lyon Commercial Court stating that Nobilis had no legal basis for ceasing operations with SouthPeak Games, wherefore all rights to there series were returned to SouthPeak Games.

In November 2010, the U.S. Securities and Exchange Commission (SEC) issued cease and desist orders against Phillips, Mroz, and SouthPeak Games for submitting incorrect SEC filings, which SouthPeak Games later stated to have been an error. After net losses of US$2.6 million and US$2.1 million in the first and second quarters of the company's fiscal year 2011, respectively, SouthPeak Games was delisted from the New York Stock Exchange in September 2011.

=== 7Sixty, closure (2011–2013) ===
On July 12, 2011, SouthPeak Games opened a new digital distribution subsidiary, 7Sixty LLC, in Grapevine, Texas. Led by vice president of publishing Leslie House and vice president of interactive entertainment Jeff Hutchinson, the studio was established in order to expand SouthPeak Games' business strategies to cover the digital market, with only one title being Stronghold 3. Stronghold 3, released on October 25, 2011, would become the last game published by SouthPeak Games and the only one published by 7Sixty, and both companies left the public eye in July 2013.

== Technology ==
The first title using Video Reality was Temujin: The Capricorn Collection, a psychological thriller that started selling in September 1997. The second title utilizing Video Reality was Dark Side of the Moon: A Sci-Fi Adventure and the third and last title utilizing Video Reality was 20,000 Leagues: The Adventure Continues, which was never released to the public.

== Games published ==
Year	Title	Platform(s)	Genre(s)
1996	Virtual Jigsaw: MasterPieces Edition	Microsoft Windows	Puzzle
1997	Temüjin	Microsoft Windows	Adventure
1997	Men in Black: The Game	Microsoft Windows	Action
1997	Monty Python's The Meaning of Life	Microsoft Windows	Adventure
1998	Dark Side of the Moon: A Sci-Fi Adventure	Microsoft Windows	Adventure
1998	The Robot Club	Microsoft Windows	Edutainment
1998	Pinky and the Brain: World Conquest	Microsoft Windows	Puzzle
1998	Looney Tunes: Cosmic Capers – Animated Jigsaws	Microsoft Windows	Puzzle
1998	Junkland Jam	Microsoft Windows	Adventure
1999	Boss Rally	Microsoft Windows	Racing
1999	Animaniacs: A Gigantic Adventure	Microsoft Windows	Platform
1999	The Dukes of Hazzard: Racing for Home	Microsoft Windows, PlayStation	Racing
1999	Wild Wild West: The Steel Assassin	Microsoft Windows	Action-adventure
1999	BoomBots	PlayStation	Fighting
1999	Animaniacs Splat Ball	Microsoft Windows	Shooter
1999	Scooby-Doo! Mystery of the Fun Park Phantom	Microsoft Windows	Adventure game
2000	Big Mountain 2000	Nintendo 64	Snowboarding
2000	Blaze & Blade: Eternal Quest	Microsoft Windows	Action role-playing game
2000	The Dukes of Hazzard II: Daisy Dukes It Out	PlayStation	Racing
2000	Rent-a-Hero	Microsoft Windows	Graphic adventure game
2006	Juka and the Monophonic Menace	Game Boy Advance	Action-adventure
2006	Scurge: Hive	Game Boy Advance, Nintendo DS	Action-adventure
2006	State of Emergency 2	PlayStation 2	Third-person shooter
2007	Brave: The Search for Spirit Dancer	PlayStation 2	Platform
2007	Monster Madness: Battle for Suburbia	Microsoft Windows, Xbox 360	Shoot 'em up
2007	Two Worlds	Microsoft Windows, Xbox 360	Role-playing
2007	Pool Party	Wii	Sports
2008	Iridium Runners	PlayStation 2	Racing
2008	Ninjatown	Nintendo DS	Strategy
2008	Legendary	PlayStation 3	First-person shooter
2008	My Baby Boy and My Baby Girl	Nintendo DS	Social simulation
2008	Legendary	Microsoft Windows, Xbox 360	First-person shooter
2008	Mushroom Men: Rise of the Fungi	Nintendo DS, Wii	Action-adventure
2008	Dream Pinball 3D	Microsoft Windows, Nintendo DS, Wii	Pinball
2008	Imperium Romanum	Microsoft Windows	Real-time strategy
2008	Hail to the Chimp	PlayStation 3	Party
2008	Roogoo	Microsoft Windows, Xbox 360	Puzzle
2008	B-Boy	PlayStation 2, PlayStation Portable	Rhythm
2008	Mister Slime	Nintendo DS	Platform
2008	Monster Madness: Grave Danger	Android, PlayStation 3	Shoot 'em up
2009	Big Bang Mini	Nintendo DS	Shoot 'em up
2009	My Baby First Steps	Nintendo DS, Wii	Social simulation
2009	X-Blades	Microsoft Windows, PlayStation 3, Xbox 360	Hack and slash
2009	Velvet Assassin	Microsoft Windows, Xbox 360	Action-adventure, stealth
2009	Pirates vs. Ninjas Dodgeball	Wii	Sports
2009	Roogoo Attack	Nintendo DS	Puzzle
2009	Roogoo Twisted Towers	Wii	Action, puzzle
2009	Brave: A Warrior's Tale	Wii, Xbox 360	Action-adventure
2009	Raven Squad: Operation Hidden Dagger	Microsoft Windows, Xbox 360	Real-time strategy
2009	Section 8	Microsoft Windows, Xbox 360	First-person shooter
2009	TNA Impact!: Cross The Line	Nintendo DS, PlayStation Portable	Sports
2009	Trine	Microsoft Windows	Platform
2010	Fast Food Panic	Nintendo DS, Wii	Simulation
2010	Sled Shred featuring the Jamaican Bobsled Team	Wii	Sports
2010	Crime Scene	Nintendo DS	Adventure
2010	Brave: Shaman's Challenge	Nintendo DS	Puzzle
2010	Horrid Henry: Missions of Mischief	Microsoft Windows, Nintendo DS, Wii	Adventure
2010	Sushi Go Round	Nintendo DS, Wii	Simulation
2010	Dementium II	Nintendo DS	First-person shooter
2010	3D Dot Game Heroes	PlayStation 3	Action-adventure
2011	Montessori Music	Nintendo DS	Edutainment
2011	Two Worlds II	Microsoft Windows, PlayStation 3, Xbox 360	Role-playing
2011	Stronghold 3	Microsoft Windows	Real-time strategy
