= Roogoo =

2008 video game

- Developer: SpiderMonk Entertainment
- Publisher: SouthPeak Games
- Platforms: Xbox 360 (XBLA), Windows
- Release: Xbox 360: WW: June 4, 2008; Windows: EU: June 20, 2008; NA: June 24, 2008 (Online); NA: June 30, 2008
- Genre: Puzzle game
- Modes: Single-player, multiplayer

Roogoo is a downloadable puzzle video game for the Xbox Live Arcade and Microsoft Windows developed by American studio SpiderMonk Entertainment and published by SouthPeak Games. The game is followed by Roogoo Twisted Towers (Wii) and Roogoo Attack (Nintendo DS).

== Gameplay ==
Roogoo gameplay screenshot.

The objective of the game is to guide special shaped meteors though a series of rotating disks and save the planet Roo and ultimately the Roogoo race. Shapes include triangles, squares, circles, stars, and so forth. Each level, the player is given a set level of meteors to try to allow safely to pass to the bottom.

When properly aligned, the disks allow the blocks to fit into the hole. When the meteor pile is heavy enough, it descends to the lower disks. When a stack hits the wrong shaped slot, the player loses meteor blocks until all of the blocks are gone or the player manages to save some of them by properly aligning them before they are all gone. The object is to get as many meteors into the bottom rung as possible.

Obstacles include "Meemoos", enemies who impede the blocks' movement. To get rid of the enemies, the player must quick drop a la Tetris the blocks to knock them out of the way; doing so causes the meteor block to bounce in the air, so it is possible to eliminate Meemoos on other slots, so long as the final location for the stack is the current slot. Butterflies will sometimes grab a falling stack and lift it to an upper rung, and the player must rotate the disc so that it goes through the proper slot.

In later levels, different gameplay mechanics come into play, such as different stacks of meteors that feature different shades of the same color within the stack, require the player to match the shades by scrolling though the stack to make sure the proper shade is aligned.

The game includes more than 45 puzzle levels with single-player, two-player same machine and party game modes, online multiplayer, and introduces bonus challenges and stages as the game progresses with new shapes and characters.

== Reception ==
Reception

Aggregate score
Aggregator	Score	
Aggregator	PC	Xbox 360
Metacritic	72/100	78/100

Review scores
Publication	Score	
Publication	PC	Xbox 360
1Up.com	N/A	A−
Eurogamer	N/A	8/10
GamePro	N/A	4/5
GamesMaster	N/A	80%
GameSpot	N/A	7.5/10
GameZone	7/10	8/10
IGN	7.1/10	8.5/10
Official Xbox Magazine (US)	N/A	8/10
PC Gamer (UK)	71%	N/A
TeamXbox	N/A	8.5/10
411Mania	N/A	8.2/10

The Xbox 360 version received "generally favorable reviews", while the PC version received "average" reviews, according to the review aggregation website Metacritic.

IGN's Nate Ahearn said of the Xbox 360 version, "Roogoo is a worthy addition to any puzzle fan's library." 1UP.com's Anthony Gallegos said of the same console version: "Its bright and cheery art style, adorably cute characters, and challenging play make this one of my favorite XBLA titles to date." TeamXbox reviewer Tom Price stated: "If you like puzzle games that require quick reflexes as well as mental acuity, then Roogoo is definitely for you." Eurogamer reviewer Dan Whitehead said of the same console version, "Roogoo is an original and beautifully presented addition to Live Arcade." Ryan McCaffrey of Official Xbox Magazine stated, "Part Jenga, part Tetris, and part Fisher-Price, Roogoo is a clever take on the block-dropping puzzle subgenre that will challenge both your brain and your willingness to stop playing." GameSpot's Carolyn Petit stated of the Xbox 360 version, "Roogoo's fast-paced, challenging twist on the old falling-shapes concept is absolutely worth a look."

The Xbox 360 version was nominated for one Xbox Live Arcade 2008 award: "Best Family Game".
