= Ben Jones (American actor and politician) =

American actor and politician (1941–2026)

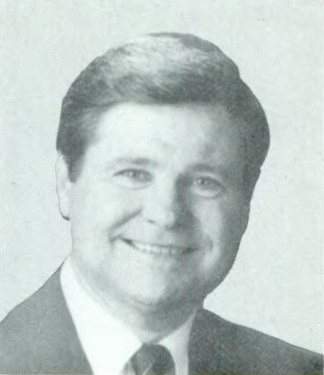
- Jones in 1989

Member of the U.S. House of Representatives from Georgia's 4th district
- In office January 3, 1989 – January 3, 1993
- Preceded by: Pat Swindall
- Succeeded by: Don Johnson (redistricted)

Personal details
- Born: Benjamin Lewis Jones; August 30, 1941 Tarboro, North Carolina, U.S.
- Died: August 9, 2026 (aged 84) Washington, Virginia, U.S.
- Party: Democratic
- Education: East Carolina University (attended); University of North Carolina, Chapel Hill (attended)

Benjamin Lewis Jones (August 30, 1941 – August 9, 2026) was an American actor, writer, politician, and businessman best known for his role as Cooter Davenport in The Dukes of Hazzard. Jones also served for four years in the United States House of Representatives from January 3, 1989, to January 3, 1993. Jones also served as the International Chief of Heritage Operations for the Sons of Confederate Veterans from July 2014 to late 2018, having been a member for over 15 years.

== Early life ==
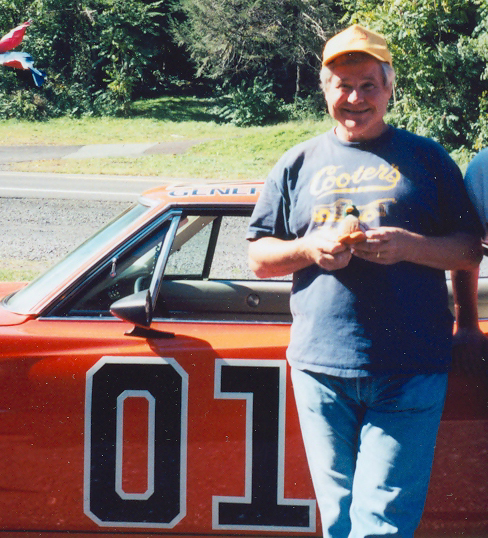
Jones and the General Lee, taken outside his store "Cooter's Place" in Sperryville, Virginia, in 1999

Jones was born in Edgecombe County, North Carolina, near McNair's Railroad Crossing, on August 30, 1941. His father was Hubert C. "Buck" Jones, a railroad section foreman and his mother was Ila Virginia Stephens, the daughter of a railroad section foreman. Within two weeks of his birth, his family moved to Portsmouth, Virginia. The Joneses lived in a "section house", a railroad company shack without indoor plumbing and electricity. That house was next to the Pinners Point Railyard that led to the shipping piers there. He graduated from Woodrow Wilson High School in 1959 and worked at a number of odd jobs to save money for college. In 1960, he entered East Carolina College (now East Carolina University) and in 1961, he was accepted into the University of North Carolina at Chapel Hill, based upon his promise as a writer.

At Chapel Hill, Jones spent summers with the railroad on a work train that contracted to various railroads throughout the South. In 1962, while at UNC, he began acting with the Carolina Playmakers and was soon earning money at it in summer stock productions and at the outdoor drama "Unto These Hills" in Cherokee, North Carolina.

During the 1960s, Jones was deeply involved in the civil rights movement. He was arrested during sit-ins, and was attacked on two occasions by the KKK.

== Acting career ==
Jones appeared in over 100 theatrical productions, including stints at the Kennedy Center, the Berkshire Theatre Festival, and numerous regional theaters. He relocated to Atlanta in 1969 and acted there with the Alliance Theatre, the Atlanta Children's Theatre, The Theatre of the Stars, and The Winter Playhouse. He also toured for two years with Eva Marie Saint in national productions of Summer and Smoke and Desire Under the Elms. In Atlanta he appeared in numerous television and radio commercials and began landing supporting roles in films, including Smokey and the Bandit (with Burt Reynolds and Jerry Reed), The Bingo Long Traveling All-Stars & Motor Kings (with James Earl Jones and Richard Pryor) and with Tim Conway in They Went That-A-Way & That-A-Way.

=== The Dukes of Hazzard ===
In the mid-1970s, he had a supporting part in an independent film called The Moonrunners, written and directed by Atlantan Gy Waldron and featuring country star Waylon Jennings, composing the music and narration. It later served as the basis for "The Dukes of Hazzard", which began production in 1978 about two miles from Jones's then residence in Covington, Georgia. Jones was cast in the role of "Cooter" Davenport, the sidekick mechanic of cousins Bo and Luke Duke. The show immediately rose to the top of the Nielsen ratings. In the days before cable, satellite dishes, and the Internet, "The Dukes" commonly attracted 40 million viewers weekly on CBS-TV.

Jones continued to live in Georgia and commuted to Los Angeles for the continued filming of "The Dukes." He served as president of the Georgia Branch of the Screen Actors Guild and was appointed chairman of the Georgia Film Commission.

== United States Congress ==
In 1986, he ran for Congress in Georgia's Fourth Congressional District against incumbent Pat Swindall. Although considered a long shot at best, Jones received over 47% of the vote in defeat. He sought a rematch in 1988, after Swindall had been indicted for perjury. Jones won by a 20-point margin and was re-elected in 1990.

In the 101st and 102nd Congresses, he was a member of the Committee on Veterans' Affairs and a member of the Committee on Public Works and Transportation. After redistricting took his seat, he ran against Newt Gingrich in 1994. He was defeated, but in the course of that race he filed ethics charges against Gingrich alleging that Gingrich had used tax-exempt groups for political purposes. Gingrich was ultimately reprimanded by the House of Representatives and ordered to reimburse the House an amount of $300,000 for the cost of the investigation. As one of the last yellow dog Democrats, Jones later became a political independent.

After moving to Virginia, Jones was the Democratic nominee to challenge Republican incumbent Eric Cantor for Virginia's 7th Congressional District seat in 2002. Jones lost to Cantor.

== Post-congressional life ==
After serving in Congress, Jones returned to show business and was cast in the role of Arlen Sporkin in director Mike Nichols' "Primary Colors" with John Travolta and Emma Thompson. He also appeared in Meet Joe Black and Joe Gould's Secret, in addition to reprising his role of "Cooter" in two "Dukes of Hazzard" reunion specials.

In 1998, Jones and his wife Alma Viator bought a colonial log cabin and farm in Rappahannock County, Virginia, adjoining the Shenandoah National Park. In 1999, they created a "Dukes of Hazzard" museum and theme store in Sperryville, Virginia, called "Cooter's". It was an immediate success. They now have three such franchises in Pigeon Forge and Nashville, Tennessee, and in Luray, Virginia. Jones and Viator also produced "Dukes" reunion festivals over the years, including one in Nashville, Tennessee, in 2006 which drew over 100,000 fans from all over the world, which The Tennessean called the largest gathering ever for a "fan" event there. They continued to keep "Hazzard Nation" growing through their stores, personal appearances, and concerts. Jones also toured with Cooter's Garage Band, performing southern and country rock and they recorded 11 CD projects, including 2020's "Play Me an Old Song."

In 2007, Random House published Jones's memoir, Redneck Boy in the Promised Land: The Confessions of "Crazy Cooter".

As a writer, Jones published fiction and poetry, in addition to political commentary in outlets including The Washington Post, The New York Times, The Boston Globe, The Atlanta Journal-Constitution, USA Today, and many others. He expressed his "maverick" political views on numerous network and cable outlets over the past 40 years.

=== Support of the Confederate battle flag ===
In 2015, Jones announced his support of the Confederate battle flag, which can be seen on the exterior top of The Dukes of Hazzard signature car, the General Lee. His defense of the flag served as his response to Warner Bros.' decision to no longer manufacture any merchandise that features the flag, such as the General Lee, and the discontinuation of reruns of the show due to Dylann Roof's infamous association with the flag. Though Jones often referred to his civil rights activism in the 1960s, quoted Martin Luther King, cited a lifelong membership in the NAACP (an organization that has been fighting against symbols that glorify the Confederate States of America), and called for dialogue between both sides of the Confederate battle flag issue, he dismissed any association between the Confederate battle flag and slavery. He also attributed any association between the Confederate battle flag and slavery to a "wave of political correctness" and called it a "cultural cleansing".

== Death ==
Jones died from a massive myocardial infarction at his home in Washington, Virginia, on August 9, 2026, aged 84 according to his wife Alma Viator.

== Filmography ==
=== Film ===
Year	Title	Role	Notes
1972	Together for Days	Douglas	
1972	The Bagel Report	Man with Women's Panties Fetish	
1975	Moonrunners	Fred	
1976	The Bingo Long Traveling All-Stars & Motor Kings	Plantation Foreman	Uncredited
1977	Smokey and the Bandit	Trucker with the Redhead	Uncredited
1977	The Lincoln Conspiracy	Samuel Arnold	
1978	They Went That-A-Way & That-A-Way	Lugs	
1983	Deep in the Heart	Chuck	
1984	On the Line	Texas Lawyer	
1988	Dakota	Mr. Dakota	
1996	Jack	Mechanic	Part cut from film
1998	Primary Colors	Arlen Sporken	
2000	Joe Gould's Secret	Southern Man at the Party	
2021	Unbreakable	Ben Jones	

=== Television ===
Year	Title	Role	Notes
1976	Movin' On	Thief	Episode: "Living It Up!"
1977	Nashville 99	Calvin Bonner	Episode: "Joldy"
1978	The Magical World of Disney	Sgt. Bingham	Episode: "The Million Dollar Dixie Deliverance"
1979–1985	The Dukes of Hazzard	Cooter / Jeeter	141 episodes
1983	Benji, Zax & the Alien Prince	Various roles	4 episodes
1987	CBS Summer Playhouse	Emory	Episode: "Travelin' Man"
1997	The Dukes of Hazzard: Reunion!	Rep. Cooter Davenport	Television film
1998	Sliders	Sgt. Lou Dawson	Episode: "Oh Brother, Where Art Thou?"
1999	As the World Turns	Judge Manning	Episode dated January 19, 1999
2000	The Dukes of Hazzard: Hazzard in Hollywood	Cooter Davenport	Television film
2005	Surface	Grocery Clerk	Episode #1.3

=== Discography ===
Year	Album	Label	Role
1999	Cooter's Place	Briar Patch	Ben Jones
2001	End of the Line	Ben Jones	Ben Jones & Cooter's Garage Band
2012	Southern to the Bone	Cooter's Place	Ben Jones & Cooter's Garage Band
2014	One for the Younguns	Cooter's Place	Ben Jones
2017	Southern Accents	Cooter's Place	Ben Jones
2018	If Not For You	Ben Jones	Ben Jones
2020	Play Me An Old Song	Ben Jones	Ben Jones & Cooter's Garage Band
2021	The Hazzard & Southern Railroad	Ben Jones	Ben Jones
2021	Christmas at Cooter's	Ben Jones	Ben Jones
2022	Good Ol' Buckaroos	Ben Jones	Ben "Buster" Jones with Cooter's Wild West Band
2022	Deep River	Ben Jones	Ben Jones & Cooter's Garage Band
2023	Soft Southern Nights	Ben Jones	Ben Jones & Cooter's Garage Band
2024	Rockabilly Road	Ben Jones	Ben Jones

=== Video games ===
Year	Title	Role
1999	The Dukes of Hazzard: Racing for Home	Cooter Davenport
2000	The Dukes of Hazzard II: Daisy Dukes It Out	Cooter Davenport
2004	The Dukes of Hazzard: Return of the General Lee	Cooter Davenport

== Book ==
- Redneck Boy in the Promised Land: The Confessions of "Crazy Cooter" (2008) – ISBN 978-0-307-39527-6

U.S. House of Representatives
Preceded by Pat Swindall	Member of the U.S. House of Representatives from Georgia's 4th congressional district 1989–1993	Succeeded by John Linder
