= My Baby (series) =

My Baby franchise
- The North American boxart for My Baby Girl
- Developers: Dancing Dots Studio, Nobilis Games
- Publishers: Nobilis, SouthPeak Games, Majesco
- Platforms: Nintendo DS, Wii
- First release: My Baby Girl and My Baby Boy; November 4, 2008
- Latest release: My Baby 3 & Friends; October 12, 2010

My Baby are a series of single-player virtual life simulation video games developed by French studios Dancing Dots Studio and Nobilis Games.

== Games ==
=== My Baby Girl/My Baby Boy ===
My Baby Girl and My Baby Boy are Nintendo DS video games released in North America on November 4, 2008, and in Europe on November 28, 2008. The games teach players the skills of parenting (the player can choose to be a daddy or a mommy) and to the experience of raising a daughter or son in the months that they spend as an infant.

The player can choose a nationality for their child in addition to their eye color. Players must create a given name (up to eight letters) to his or her character before beginning the actual game. However, there is no need to insert either a middle name or a surname because of memory constraints.

Two developmental challenges (i.e., teaching the baby how to speak or teaching the baby how to crawl) must be passed before the baby is allowed to grow by one month. Using the microphone to expand the baby's vocabulary and the stylus to put on new clothes for them helps provide the challenges that new parents face with their infants every day. Babies must be given baby formula in a bottle and the game is similar to the Tamagotchi devices of the mid-1990s. There was originally an option to create a "My Baby" game combining two genders in one cartridge but the idea was funneled off into two different cartridges.

One of the other mandatory features of the game include flatulence, cooing, and the changing of the diaper when the baby urinates or has a bowel movement.

=== My Baby First Steps ===
My Baby First Steps, known in Europe as My Baby 2: My Baby Grew Up, is a video game for the Nintendo DS and Wii. The player's son or daughter has grown out of infancy and into toddlerhood. As a virtual parent, the player gets to control the character until he or she turns three years old (and approaches childhood) (but a glitch on 23 months prevents to go over 23 months because still if you do a circle with the cuddling toy the baby will never dance on the spot). The baby will discover his or her entire environment, walk, babble, and even speak (saying either mommy or daddy depending on the gender of the player). Three-dimensional animations makes baby look more lifelike and an improved artificial intelligence makes the virtual baby act like the player's actual son or daughter. Babies will grow from a physical and a psychological view. The player can choose between having a boy or a girl in a single cartridge unlike the prequels.

A shopping mall is introduced to purchase possessions for the baby and the home featuring generic clothing that doesn't have any fashion designer's name branded on them.

The game has a realistic nurse and pediatrician that teaches the player how to take care of their son or daughter.

=== My Baby 3 & Friends ===
My Baby 3 & Friends is a 2010 Nintendo DS game developed by Dancing Dots and published by Majesco. As a toddler, the player's son or daughter is exposed to activities like swimming, the swing set at the local playground, and even a playground slide for stimulation and development. Players are also expected to allow their babies to socialize with either another baby or with a puppy. The timeline of the baby's development starts the baby off at 15 months (1 year and three months) and ends it at 30 months (2 years and six months). Thirty new skills can be developed in a non-linear fashion; making the parenting aspects of the game more in tune with the child's actual development.

== Critical reception ==
IGN awarded My Baby Girl 5.0 out of 10 (equivalent to 50% or a F letter grade), finding the graphics to be adequate but criticized the slow pacing, underwhelming music, and lack of actual gaming content. An issue was raised with the nudity and urination, which the reviewer felt might be uncomfortable for non-parents.
