= The Dukes of Hazzard II: Daisy Dukes It Out =

2000 video game

- North American cover art
- Developer: Sinister Games
- Publishers: NA: SouthPeak Interactive; EU: Ubi Soft
- Series: The Dukes of Hazzard
- Platform: PlayStation
- Release: NA: November 7, 2000; EU: March 28, 2002
- Genre: Racing
- Modes: Single player Multiplayer

The Dukes of Hazzard II: Daisy Dukes It Out is a racing video game developed by Sinister Games and published by SouthPeak Interactive in North America and Ubi Soft in Europe for the PlayStation in 2000. It is based on the television series The Dukes of Hazzard, which aired from 1979 to 1985; and is a sequel to the 1999 racing video game The Dukes of Hazzard: Racing for Home, also developed by Sinister Games.

== Gameplay ==
Like the first game, its story is told through a series of animated cutscenes: disguised as a geologist named Melanie Shaw, Daisy Duke's childhood friend Missy Law comes to Hazzard County with plans to rob Hazzard Bank and frame Daisy for the crime. Gameplay is similar to its predecessor and primarily consists of the player completing tasks and beating time challenges, collecting icons, delivering passengers to specific destinations, and running errands for characters, while avoiding Sheriff Rosco P. Coltrane, Deputy Cletus Hogg and Deputy Enos Strate. The player plays as Bo Duke, Luke Duke, and Jesse Duke. Unlike its predecessor, the game also allows the player to play as Daisy, and introduces an open world environment. A free-roaming joyride mode removes all enemies and allows the player to explore all of Hazzard County, including locations from the television series such as the Boar's Nest.

The game features 18 levels, most of which are played while driving the General Lee; six levels are played as Daisy, who drives a Jeep and the Road Runner. Country rock music plays during each level. The game features a total of eight soundtracks, which can be changed by the player. Items such as wrenches can be collected to repair the player's vehicle when it takes too much damage, while nitro gas can be used to give the player a temporary increase of speed. A multiplayer option is also available, in which players can compete against each other in a variety of game modes. Other vehicles, including Jesse's truck, can be selected during multiplayer mode.

== Development ==
The Dukes of Hazzard II: Daisy Dukes It Out was developed by Sinister Games, using an updated version of its predecessor's game engine. Many actors from the television series provided their voices to their respective characters in the game: John Schneider (Bo Duke), Tom Wopat (Luke Duke), Catherine Bach (Daisy Duke), James Best (Rosco), Sonny Shroyer (Enos), Rick Hurst (Cletus) and Ben Jones (Cooter Davenport), and Waylon Jennings (The Balladeer).

== Reception ==
Reception

Aggregate score
Aggregator	Score
Metacritic	53/100

Review scores
Publication	Score
AllGame	2/5
Electronic Gaming Monthly	1.67/10
GameSpot	5.8/10
IGN	4.5/10
Official U.S. PlayStation Magazine	2/5

The game received "mixed" reviews according to video game review aggregator Metacritic.

Frank Provo of GameSpot said that "despite a few gameplay touch-ups and a plot change, the game is a carbon copy of the first." Provo praised the game's open-world environment, and also wrote, "The characters are smoothly rendered and nicely animated, but they better resemble lifeless marionettes than actual human beings. On more than one occasion, you may find yourself wondering if Jesse Duke is actually some demon." Provo noted that "as odd as it may seem, the game's namesake, Daisy, only participates in six of the game's missions." Provo also wrote that "slowdown and texture warping" were not as much of an issue in the game as they were in its predecessor, but criticized its "pathetically poor" artificial intelligence and wrote, "Unfortunately, roadway improvements are the game's only major gameplay enhancement. All 18 of the game's missions are just as nonsensical, bug-laden, and straightforward as those found in the first Dukes game." Provo concluded that only fans of the television series would be interested in the game, which he wrote "is just far too buggy, easy, and uninspiring to hold your attention for more than a few hours, let alone a standard rental period."

Chris Carle of IGN also felt that the game would only appeal to fans of the television series, and wrote, "Since Southpeak didn't feel comfortable simply repackaging its old game in a new box, the company made a conciliatory effort to try to make Dukes of Hazzard II: Daisy Dukes it Out a bit different. But trust me, they didn't. [...] In fact, you could probably buy two copies of Racing For Home and pretend one was a new game. You'd barely know the difference." Carle noted that while the game contained "a little more variety" than its predecessor, "you still spend the majority of your time on the same boring roads. [...] Southpeak has also made the levels about twice as long, which definitely adds challenge. The drawback, however, is that in almost every track, there is a point where everything will stop and the second half of the track will load. This is absolutely inexcusable. It kills momentum, it seriously cuts down on fun, and it's lame." Carle also criticized the slow response time of the game's controls: "In a racing game, bad control makes for a bad game. That's definitely the story here."

Carle praised the game's variety of vehicle selection as a "significant improvement" over the previous game, but wrote that they all "have the same sluggish control." Carle wrote that the vehicles were "probably the best looking part of the game," noting, "The downfall of the first Dukes game was the rather weak, unvaried textures. This trend continues here, except that each level is twice as long, and presents twice the opportunity to disappoint. It's not that the graphics are awful. They're passable, but they're bland and unimaginative. After a couple missions on the Hazzard backroads, you'll be dying to see something besides rolling fields, endless fences, trees, and corn. This game has lots of corn. The cutscenes aren't much better. It looks like they used the same Planet of the Apes character models as in the first game. The best looking characters are Roscoe P. Coltrane and Enos, and even they look like Claymation mutants." Carle called the game's sound effects "rather weak," and said the vehicle engine sounds were "especially cheesy." Carle concluded that, "In addition to lacking innovation, it just gets plain boring as you slug through the 18 missions. Bottom line: it's like watching a bad re-run".

Jon Thompson of AllGame criticized the game's "fairly boring and repetitive" gameplay, and wrote that it was "essentially the same as its weak predecessor". Thompson criticized the game's "disturbing looking CG-rendered characters" and complained that "most of the game involves running errands" for characters. Thompson wrote that "for a game made this late in the system's life, it sure does look ugly. It's grainy, the famous PlayStation distortion is in full effect, and the only two colors that seem to be in the developer's palette are brown and green. It's another reason that one gets lost so easily; everything looks the same. And if you're big into banjo music... you won't like the sound here one bit. True connoisseurs of good, old-fashioned bluegrass will hate the generic chase music that blares here, as will most anyone else." Thompson said, "The two-player modes are fine for a couple of plays but fail to sustain their excitement beyond that," and concluded that "there just isn't enough of a hook here unless you're a tremendous fan of the show."
