= Section 8 (video game) =

2009 first-person shooter video game

- Developer: TimeGate Studios
- Publishers: SouthPeak Games; TimeGate Studios
- Director: Alan B. Chaveleh
- Producer: Robert Siwiak
- Designer: Brett Norton
- Programmer: Denis Papp
- Artist: Zachary Forcher
- Composer: Jason Graves
- Engine: Unreal Engine 3
- Platforms: Microsoft Windows, PlayStation 3, Xbox 360
- Release: Xbox 360, Windows: NA: September 1, 2009 (X360); NA: September 4, 2009 (PC); EU: September 11, 2009; AU: September 24, 2009; PlayStation 3: NA: March 25, 2010; PAL: April 15, 2010
- Genre: First-person shooter
- Modes: Single-player, multiplayer

Section 8 is a first-person shooter video game developed by TimeGate Studios and published by SouthPeak Games. It utilizes the Unreal Engine 3 and was released for Microsoft Windows, PlayStation 3 and Xbox 360. It was released in September 2009 for Xbox 360 and PC, and for the PlayStation 3 on March 25 in North America and April 15, 2010, in the PAL region.

== Gameplay ==
In Section 8, characters wear powered armor suits which provide damage absorption and augmented mobility. Players can use "overdrive" to move horizontally at superhuman speeds, or activate vertical thrusters (jetpack) to achieve new heights.

Players are able to "burn-in" by dropping onto the battlefield from orbital dropships hovering at 15,000 feet (4,600 meters) from the surface, thus eliminating fixed spawn points. "Burning-in" also creates the opportunity for the player to choose where they drop on the map, granting the game an increased aspect of unpredictability. This process is an interactive experience as players can be shot down upon entry by players and anti-aircraft turrets alike, though these situations can be avoided or mitigated by using the "air-brake" feature which allows the player to make mid-air adjustments.

Players are encouraged to work in teams to achieve objectives and defend one another. They may deploy defensive structures such as Mini-Gun Turrets, Rocket Turrets, Anti-Air Turrets, Supply Depots, or Sensor Arrays to protect friendly-controlled objectives, or deploy vehicles such as Tanks or Heavy Armors which can operate to assault enemy-controlled objectives. Players can purchase these using "Requisition Points" which are awarded to the player for various feats they perform through play.

Players are able to choose their primary and secondary weapons, such as assault rifles, pistols, shotguns, and sniper rifles, as well as grenades, explosives, knives, mortar launchers and healing units. The player is also able to create their own player class through various stackable modules that determine the player's speed, stealth, or the regeneration of the limited-use jetpack. Excessive damage endured by the player to certain parts of their body, such as their legs, arms, head, or chest, may disable or hinder the use of these enhancements.

Dynamic Combat Missions (DCMs), a type of mini-game, can be activated mid-combat by the player, and can reward the player with Requisition Points when completed successfully. Some DCMs will include protecting a convoy, capture intelligence, or assassinating an enemy character.

=== Campaign ===
Section 8 includes a single-player campaign mode called "Corde's Story" that allows the player to proceed as a character named Alex Corde of the 8th Armored Infantry. The first several missions take place on the arid planet New Madrid and later move to a temperate planet. The single-player campaign consists of eight objective-based missions on the same maps as multiplayer that serve as a tutorial to the player for multiplayer play.

=== Multiplayer ===
Section 8 supports X-Server functionality, where players can run their own dedicated servers for Xbox 360 games using a Windows-based PC. An X Server can handle up to 32 players at once. Similar to this, the PlayStation 3 version supports TGNServer technology which allows players to host dedicated servers using a Windows-based PC with up to 32 players. The PC version also features a 40-player maximum with dedicated servers, and 32-player maximum with P2P servers. Computer-controlled characters (bots) may also be used to fill remaining slots in multiplayer games for Xbox 360, PlayStation 3, and PC.

== Plot ==
The name "Section 8" is derived from an old United States military discharge regulation for reason of being mentally unfit for service, and also refers to the 8th Armored Infantry in the game because of their participation in near-suicidal missions.

Section 8 takes place in the future after the human race has discovered interstellar travel and has colonized across the galaxy. At the time of the game, a group called the Arm of Orion, has begun to 'disconnect' the outermost frontier planets from the main governing body, taking them over while keeping their presence hidden from the government. As space travel is slow, it often takes weeks to communicate with or travel to a frontier world, affording the Arm with enough time to seize worlds and build their base of power, ultimately preparing an ambush for the government forces that will eventually respond. The government then discovers the Arm of Orion, and sends in the 8th Armored Infantry, including Alex Corde (the player), on a mission to investigate, and presumably fight, the Arm invasion.

TimeGate Studios cited Aliens and Blade Runner as major influences for the game.

== Development ==
An open beta for Section 8 was made available at FilePlanet. Access to the game's beta was originally limited to residents in the U.S. and Canada, but the beta was later made public. Attendees of Multiplay's i37 also got a beta key despite being in the UK.

A downloadable demo was released on Xbox Live in August 2009. This multiplayer-only demo allowed for online play on Xbox Live or offline play with AI-controlled bots on one map for indefinite playtime.

=== PlayStation 3 version ===
There was originally speculation that a PlayStation 3 version would release alongside the Xbox 360 and PC versions, though it was not released during this time-frame. Speaking at Gamescom 2009, SouthPeak Games, the publisher, said that a PlayStation 3 version existed, but there were no dates yet on its release.

The game was officially released as a PlayStation Network exclusive downloadable title, and was published by TimeGate Studios in March 2010 in North America. The downloadable version included the three bonus maps that were released for the Xbox 360 and PC versions, along with a number of other reported improvements. This version also included the ability for 32-player games to be hosted on a PC. It was later released in the PAL region on April 15.

== Reception ==
Reception

Aggregate score
Aggregator	Score		
Aggregator	PC	PS3	Xbox 360
Metacritic	72/100	72/100	69/100

Review scores
Publication	Score		
Publication	PC	PS3	Xbox 360
Destructoid	N/A	N/A	7/10
Edge	N/A	N/A	7/10
Eurogamer	8/10	N/A	N/A
Game Informer	6.5/10	N/A	6.5/10
GamePro	N/A	N/A	4/5
GameSpot	7/10	7/10	7/10
GameTrailers	N/A	N/A	6.8/10
GameZone	7/10	7.5/10	8.1/10
Giant Bomb	3/5	N/A	3/5
IGN	8/10	7.5/10	7.5/10
PlayStation Official Magazine – UK	N/A	6/10	N/A
Official Xbox Magazine (US)	N/A	N/A	7.5/10
PC Gamer (UK)	85%	N/A	N/A
PC PowerPlay	7/10	N/A	N/A
411Mania	N/A	8/10	N/A
Teletext GameCentral	N/A	N/A	7/10

Section 8 received "average" reviews on all platforms according to the review aggregation website Metacritic. Though the PC version of the game is ranked slightly higher, a complaint common to both console and PC versions is the lack of server population. IGN praised the game for its multiplayer features and for its effective implementation of concepts drawn from the genre's history, but conceded that the game found itself "stumbling over some control and combat speedbumps". GamePro gave a similar review, highlighting the multiplayer nature of the game and describing it as "hardly worth a second glance" to the single-player. GameSpot also gave a somewhat positive review of the multiplayer, although criticism was directed towards the game's vehicles, with the opinion that the vehicles could have been more inspired.

== Sequel ==
A sequel to Section 8 was made by TimeGate, titled Section 8: Prejudice.

Unlike its predecessor, Prejudice is a digital download-only release. It was released for Xbox Live Arcade on April 20, 2011, PC on May 4, and a PlayStation Network in summer.
