= Temüjin (video game) =

1997 video game

Temüjin: A Supernatural Adventure
- Developer: SouthPeak Interactive
- Publisher: SouthPeak Interactive
- Writer: Lee Sheldon
- Engine: Video Reality
- Platform: Microsoft Windows
- Release: October 2, 1997
- Genre: Adventure
- Mode: Single player

Temüjin (also known as Temüjin: A Supernatural Adventure and Temüjin: The Capricorn Collection) is a 1997 computer game developed and published by SouthPeak Interactive.

== Plot ==
Based partially on the life of Genghis Khan, the plot involves an unidentified character (controlled by the player) who has appeared in the Stevenson Museum where ancient Mongolian artifacts are being displayed. The protagonist must find out who they and the other people in the museum are and solve the mysteries of unusual events occurring at the museum. Along the way, the player is aided by a ghost girl, Mei, who is freed after the first mission.

== Gameplay ==
The game is a first-person adventure with 360 degree movement and live action graphics. It is a point-and-click adventure (occasionally pixel-hunting). The game consists of seven chapters, spread out over six disks, in each of which the player must fulfill a specific goal in order to clear the act. Most puzzles are solved by examining items and combining them.

== Development ==
The game was the first to use SouthPeak Games's "Video Reality" engine and was also the first game to be made entirely on 35 mm film. Lee Sheldon, best known for the critically acclaimed Ripley's Believe It or Not!: The Riddle of Master Lu, served as the game's writer and designer. During the development stage, the game was advertised heavily in gaming magazines as being a full motion video game with the interactivity that was missing in previous first person adventures.

Development took 18 months. The video sequences were filmed with a production crew of over 180 people using special four-walled sets, which were a challenge for the cameramen.

== Reception ==
Next Generation reviewed the PC version of the game, rating it three stars out of five, and stated that "Temujin is a fairly solid first step towards the next generation of point-and-click adventure games, and SouthPeak's Video Reality technology allows developers to bring actual locations to games with ease. However, the games themselves still need a good plot and solid interface, and here's where Temujin lacks something."

At the time, the popularity of adventure and full motion video games had all but vanished and the game was a commercial failure. Critics mostly gave the game less than favorable reviews as the boasted interactivity and realistic graphics were non-existent. The video screen was much smaller than the screen size and contained blurry visuals, and the fact that the main character was both mute and suffering from amnesia severely limited interaction with gameplay characters.

Despite the poor reception, the game was still named a finalist by the Academy of Interactive Arts & Sciences for "Outstanding Achievement in Software Engineering" at the 1st Annual Interactive Achievement Awards.

== Reviews ==
- Electric Games (1997)
- Quandary (Nov, 1997)
- GameSpot (Nov 17, 1997)
- Just Adventure (1997)
- Just Adventure (1997)
