= Kohan II: Kings of War =

2004 video game

- Developer: TimeGate Studios
- Publishers: Take Two Interactive, Global Star Software
- Producer: Adel Chaveleh
- Designers: Ian Klimon; Steve Hemmesch
- Programmers: Denis Papp; Phillip Bowman; John McDonald
- Artists: Zachary Forcher; Enrique Piña III
- Writer: Mark Yohalem
- Composer: Jeremy Soule
- Engine: Gamebryo
- Platform: Windows
- Release: EU: September 17, 2004; NA: September 23, 2004; AU: September 24, 2004
- Genre: Real-time strategy
- Modes: Single-player, multiplayer

Kohan II: Kings of War is a 2004 real-time strategy video game developed by TimeGate Studios exclusively for Windows. It is the sequel to Kohan: Immortal Sovereigns.

== Gameplay ==
=== Races ===
Kohan II features six playable races: human, haroun, drauga, gauri, undead, and shadow. Each race has its own unique units, buildings, and economic factors, such as reliances on particular types of resources over other types. Each race can also belong to a particular faction. There are five factions total (although not every race can choose from all of the factions) and each of these confers certain benefits.

== Story ==
The villainous Ceyah, now scattered and hunted by the forces of the Kohan Nationalists, are in a desperate bid to regain their lost power. They manage to narrowly escape, led by the ranger Melchior and following the instructions of the mad wizard Sebak, who claims that the Shadow speaks to him and is claiming that the Ceyah must travel through the Waste and go to the Well of Shadow to regain their lost power. In the process of marching through the Waste, they create an Undead army by slaughtering half of the Drauga people and their dragon god. Upon reaching the Well of Shadow, Sebak is transformed at the site into the mighty Abbadon, the seemingly indestructible master of The Shadow. All of the Ceyah, except Melchior, submit to Abaddon's will, and become the Fallen. Melchior flees as the Nationalist hunters have caught up. Expecting the Ceyah to come out from the dead end, the Nationalist forces only end up being massacred by Abaddon's immense power and the swarms of demons and Undead spawning from the well.

With legions of The Fallen: The ever-growing Undead and the demons of Shadow, at his command, Abbadon sweeps out over the face of the planet Khaldun in an attempt to extinguish all of its major races: the Humans of the Midlands, the Gauri of the High Reaches, the Drauga of The Wastes and The Haroun of the Forests. In the end, the Shadow aims to eventually destroy Khaldun and force Khaldun's Creator to join the battle and destroy him to claim his celestial paradise.

Melchior, now considered as a traitor by the Fallen, seeks out members of the Kohan Council to stop the Shadow. He finds himself confronted by his own hunter, the Istiran seeker Naava Daishan, alongside the newly revived Kohan warrior Jonas Teramun. Melchior seems to know Jonas from somewhere, but their connection is not yet clear. Unfortunately for Naava, she has learned from Melchior that her own sovereign Regent and most of the Nationalist faction have been converted into Undead and corrupted demons of the Shadow and must destroy them. Forming an uneasy alliance, the trio set out towards the various kingdoms of the Humans, Gauri, Drauga, and Haroun in an attempt to rally the forces of good to combat the oncoming darkness. Along the way, Naava hears a voice calling to her and proceeds to fight the Shadow to reach the source.

It is there that a representative of the elemental races of Khaldun: the Trow (earth), the Jotun (frost/water), the Djinn (air) and the Ifrit (fire), reveals to the heroes that the elemental races are threatening to cleanse Khaldun of the Shadow themselves by using their combined might to bring about a natural cataclysm that will destroy Khaldun so it will not fall to the Shadow. Now, the heroes and the combined forces of the remaining Nationalist and Council factions must race against time to purge the Shadow from the world themselves, but they know they will need to reach King Darius Javidan and his Royalist Kingdom, who have yet to know of the Shadow's coming.

During this revelation, Jonas also learns through Melchior that he was once the Ceyah battle commander Sijansur. A brief crisis of faith in his allegiance to the Kohan Council is averted when Melchior himself cleaves the metal mask from Jonas' face as he is about to reclaim his full identity as his former pre-cleansing self. Melchior admonishes Jonas to rest, and they rush back to rejoin Naava's forces.

After liberating the homelands of the Gauri, the Drauga, and the Haroun and gaining their allegiance, Naava, Jonas and Melchior reach Darius Javidan and his Royalists to the West. Finding the Royalist army has already been preparing to combat the Shadow, Darius declares that they must reach the Well of Shadow, where his wife, the former Ceyah Roxanna Javidan, must use her knowledge of the Shadow's dark powers to close the well. Darius asks the heroes and the remaining Council and Nationalist forces to distract the Shadow's forces while his Royalists march upon the well. They successfully defeat the majority of the Shadow and Undead forces while defending the Council capital of Rhusk, and soon after they set back out into the Waste to join the Royalists in the battle to reach the Well of Shadow.

After returning the Wastes and fighting through the initial wave of Fallen forces, the heroes learn that the Royalists armies have been cut in two by a battle with a massive shadow force, and Darius has no hope of reaching the well anytime soon. The Nationalist, Council, and Royalist forces combine and make one final push against the Well. It is there that Abaddon awaits, guarding the well as the demons of Shadow continue to spawn from it. Although she does not know the secret from Roxanna how to close the well, Naava can indeed seal it with the aid of the mana nodes located nearby. Unfortunately, the energy from the mana nodes would be so immense, Naava knows that her amulet would shatter and her life would be beyond revival. When the army arrives at the Well, they manage to defeat Abaddon, and the resulting explosion kills off the majority of the forces of Light.

Now Naava must act, as she hears the voices of the Elementals as they are gathering and are almost ready to unleash the new Cataclysm. Jonas pleads with Naava to give them time to stop the Elementals from destroying Khaldun. However, Naava will have none of it, understanding that all life on the planet will be extinguished if she doesn't act right away. She steps into the well, drawing upon all of her arcane knowledge and the power of the mana nodes to slam the doorway between Khaldun and the Shadow Realm shut. Deprived of their power source, all of the remaining Shadow spawn die and vaporize instantly, and the bones of the Undead fall silent. All that remains of Naava is her broken amulet, a sign that she cannot be revived.

Jonas, crushed at the loss of his friend, is given cold comfort by Melchior. He wants his former Ceyah companion to stay and honor Naava's sacrifice. Melchior refuses, choosing to do as he always has: roaming the countryside and living by his wits, owing allegiance to no one - especially the Kohan who would dare to see him cleansed of his Ceyah identity. While it is not clear why he prefers his current existence, he simply tells Jonas as the story ends that the two men will meet again.

== Development ==
The game used the Gamebryo engine.

== Reception ==
Reception

Aggregate score
Aggregator	Score
Metacritic	81/100

Review scores
Publication	Score
Computer Games Magazine	4.5/5
Computer Gaming World	4.5/5
Eurogamer	7/10
Game Informer	8/10
GameSpot	8.5/10
GameSpy	4.5/5
GameZone	8.5/10
IGN	8.6/10
PC Gamer (US)	79%
X-Play	3/5

The game received "favorable" reviews, albeit moderately less than the original Kohan, according to the review aggregation website Metacritic. It was praised for retaining the unique game play that had made the original game a hit while making key changes that distinguished it from the originals and other real-time strategy games of the year. The game also made the jump to 3D graphics from the 2D graphics of the previous games.

Computer Games Magazine named Kohan II the eighth-best computer game of 2004. The editors declared it "head-and-shoulders above almost every other strategy game in terms of battlefield tactics." It also won the magazine's "Best AI" award. The editors of Computer Gaming World nominated Kohan II as their 2004 "Strategy Game of the Year (Real-Time)", although it lost to Warhammer 40,000: Dawn of War.
