= Elliott H. Levitas =

American politician and attorney (1930–2022)

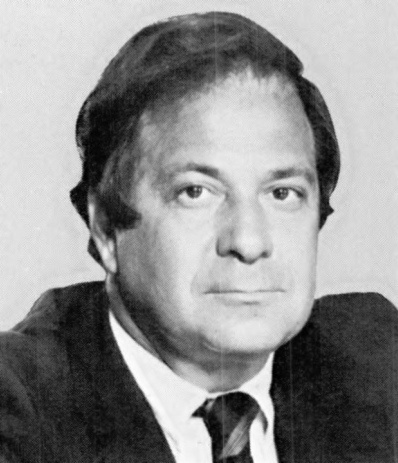

Member of the U.S. House of Representatives from Georgia's 4th district
- In office January 3, 1975 – January 3, 1985
- Preceded by: Benjamin B. Blackburn
- Succeeded by: Pat Swindall

Member of the Georgia House of Representatives
- In office 1965 – January 1975
- Preceded by: multi-member district
- Succeeded by: John Hawkins
- Constituency: 118th district, Post 4 (1965-1969); 77th district, Post 4 (1969-1973); 50th district (1973-1975)

Personal details
- Born: Elliott Harris Levitas; December 26, 1930 Atlanta, Georgia, U.S.
- Died: December 16, 2022 (aged 91) Atlanta, Georgia, U.S.
- Resting place: Arlington Memorial Park near Atlanta
- Party: Democratic
- Education: Emory University (BA, JD); University of Oxford (LLM)
- Profession: Attorney

Military service
- Branch/service: United States Air Force
- Years of service: 1955-1958

Elliott Harris Levitas (December 26, 1930 – December 16, 2022) was an American politician and lawyer from Georgia. A member of the Democratic Party, he served as a member of the United States House of Representatives for five consecutive terms from 1975 to 1985. He was the first Jewish congressman elected in Georgia.

== Early life ==
Born in Atlanta, Georgia, Levitas graduated in 1948 from Henry W. Grady High School there. He attended Emory University in Atlanta, where he was a member of the secret honor society D.V.S. In 1956, he earned a Juris Doctor from the Emory University School of Law. A Rhodes scholar, he received a Master of Laws degree in 1958 from University of Oxford in England. He conducted additional study in law at the University of Michigan from 1954 to 1955. He was admitted to the Georgia bar in 1955 and commenced practice in Atlanta.

Levitas was active in the local Jewish community in Atlanta and with the Anti-Defamation League. He was in the United States Air Force from 1955 to 1958.

== Political career ==
Levitas was a delegate to the 1964 Democratic National Convention in Atlantic City, New Jersey, which nominated the Lyndon B. Johnson/Hubert Humphrey ticket, the first Democratic slate to lose the electoral votes of Georgia since the Reconstruction era.

=== State legislature ===
Levitas was elected to the Georgia House of Representatives in 1964 and served from 1965 to 1974. Early in his first term, he gained notoriety for voting in support of civil rights activist Julian Bond, who was in a contested battle to be assume his seat following his election to the legislature. Levitas was one of only five white legislators to vote in support of seating Bond.

In his second term in the state House, he was one of thirty Democrats who voted for the Republican Bo Callaway, rather than the Democratic nominee, Lester Maddox, a segregationist from Atlanta, in the disputed 1966 gubernatorial race. The legislature, however, chose Maddox to resolve the deadlock though Callaway had led the balloting in the general election by some three thousand votes. In all, Levitas served five terms in the legislature.

=== Tenure in Congress ===
Levitas was elected as a Democrat for Georgia's 4th congressional district to the 94th United States Congress and to the four succeeding Congresses (January 3, 1975 – January 3, 1985). Levitas represented a district dominated by DeKalb County, Georgia, northeast of Atlanta.

For four terms prior to his election, Benjamin B. Blackburn, a Republican, represented the area. Elected in the Watergate class of 1974, he quickly established himself as a champion of causes related to the environment, eventually rising to the chairmanship of the committee with oversight on such matters.

He was an unsuccessful candidate for reelection to the 99th United States Congress in 1984, losing to Republican Pat Swindall amid Ronald Reagan carrying the district in a landslide.

== Later life ==
After Congress, Levitas was a partner with Kilpatrick Townsend & Stockton. His most notable case, Cobell v. Norton, involved a lawsuit of the Blackfeet tribe against the U.S. Government over the amount owed to the tribe for land that had been taken and used for various industrial purposes. The successful $3.4 billion verdict was at the time the largest ever class-action award against the U.S. government.

== Death ==
Levitas died on December 16, 2022, at age 91, ten days before his 92nd birthday. He was buried at Arlington Memorial Park near Atlanta. Each year, his alma mater, Emory University, issues an award in Levitas’s honor to the outstanding graduating senior political science major.

== See also ==
- List of Jewish members of the United States Congress

U.S. House of Representatives
Preceded by Benjamin B. Blackburn	Member of the U.S. House of Representatives from Georgia's 4th congressional district January 3, 1975 – January 3, 1985	Succeeded by Pat Swindall
