= Kohan: Immortal Sovereigns =

2001 video game

- Developer: TimeGate Studios (Note: Linux port developed and published by Loki Software.)
- Publishers: NA: Strategy First; EU: Ubi Soft
- Producer: Adel Chaveleh
- Designers: Alan B. Chaveleh; Steve Hemmesch
- Programmer: Denis Papp
- Artist: Zachary Forcher
- Composer: Phillipe Charron
- Platforms: Windows, Linux
- Release: Windows: NA: March 15, 2001; EU: October 16, 2001; Linux; August 24, 2001; Ahriman's Gift; Windows: NA: November 6, 2001; EU: September 20, 2002; Linux; August 20, 2002
- Genre: Real-time strategy
- Modes: Single-player, multiplayer

Kohan: Immortal Sovereigns is a real-time strategy video game developed by TimeGate Studios. It was published for Microsoft Windows by Strategy First in North America and Ubi Soft in Europe, and ported to Linux by Loki Software, both in 2001. With a high fantasy setting, the game follows immortal beings named Kohan. It features a lengthy single-player campaign and skirmish maps playable in multiplayer or against the AI. The gameplay focuses on controlling companies instead of individual soldiers, a mechanic praised by critics for eliminating micromanagement. A sequel, Kohan II: Kings of War, was released in 2004.

== Gameplay ==
The Kohan economy has five resources, of which gold, as the only resource which can be stockpiled, is the most important. The four secondary resources, stone, wood, iron, and mana, are used to support the military; if their production is insufficient, gold income will be decreased to accommodate. Resources are produced in settlements or in mines; mines can only be placed in predetermined locations. Settlements have a number of slots to be occupied by one of eight components; each produces a particular resource, or gives another benefit to the settlement. Settlements also determine the support limit, which represents the number of companies the player can support.

The company creation screen of an undeveloped town. The five categories of units can be clearly seen; grey units are currently unavailable for recruitment.

The main military unit in Kohan is the company. Each company is led by a Captain, has four front line units, and can have up to two different support units. The units available for company creation depend on the components in the settlement where the company is being recruited. For each company, a recruitment cost must be paid in gold; furthermore, each unit in the company requires a certain amount of secondary resources to support itself. Companies are defined by experience, morale and formation. A company's support units and Kohan can provide additional modifiers, affecting attack strength, move speed, defense and other. Once a company engages in combat, each unit will fight individually. As long as a single unit survives combat, the company can eventually resupply to full strength.

Units in Kohan are divided into six categories: infantry, cavalry, archer, specialty, support, and Hero elements. The first four categories can be both front line and support troops, while the fifth may only occupy support unit slots. The sixth category represents the Kohan, who are the most powerful units, and can only be put in the Captain slot. Each Kohan can provide several modifiers and cast several spells. Kohan have an experience stat separate from the companies' experience, which affect their abilities. If a Kohan dies, he may be resurrected, but will lose all experience. If no Kohan is available, a Captain without any special abilities will lead the company. Kohan can be detached from and attached to companies at any time if the company is in supply (see below).

A significant element in Kohan are the three zones: Zone of Control (ZoC), Zone of Supply (ZoS) and Zone of Population (ZoP). Each company has a ZoC, which is based on formation. If a company's ZoC overlaps with an enemy company's ZoC, they will engage in combat. The ZoS is the area in which companies can be healed; it is provided by settlements, unless the settlement is under siege, and is based on a settlement's size and components. If a company's ZoC overlaps with a friendly ZoS, the company is considered "in supply" and will heal when out of combat. Each settlement also has a ZoP, representing the lands already inhabited. New settlements must be built outside the ZoP.

== Setting ==
Kohan follows the story of a Kohan named Darius Javidan as he fights the rise of the Ceyah, Kohan tainted by evil, to re-establish Kohan society in Khaldun. According to Steve Hemmesch, TimeGate Studio's lead designer at the time, the storyline of Kohan was influenced by Persian mythology and Zoroastrianism. The Kohan are a group of immortals that the Creator tasked with protecting and fostering Khaldun. Although the Kohan can be killed with violence, they only remain dead until they are "awakened" through the use of individually assigned amulets.

When the Creator desired to build a new world, he consulted the two greatest of his Saadya, angel-like beings, named Ahriman and Ormazd. Of the two plans proposed, Ormazd's best fit the Creator's vision and the remaining eight Saadya were ordered to create the world, which Ormazd had named Khaldun. During its construction, however, Ahriman, whose plan had been rejected, plotted Khaldun's downfall. While Kohan culture bloomed early on in Khaldun's history, it was destroyed in The Great Cataclysm when certain Kohan desired to be free from the will of the Creator. The Kohan defeated the Ceyah and the traitors were sent away from Kohan society. One Ceyah, Vashti, formerly known as Roxanna Javidan, Darius Javidan's wife, was particularly rebellious against the Creator. She murdered her husband and led the Ceyah armies, hoping to become a tyrant over all of Khaldun.

=== Playable races ===
There are seven distinct playable races in the Kohan series, all of which are common within the fantasy genre, though some have game-specific names. The Mareten (humans), Gauri (dwarves), Drauga (orcs), Haroun (elves), Slaan (lizardfolk), Undead, and Shadow have Kohan that resemble them, although supposedly all Kohan originally appeared human. It is explained that Kohan who dwell with a race for a number of years begin to take on their physical attributes. It is also said that Kohan who were enlightened could take on a War Form (Drauga like) or a Magic Form (Haroun like) in addition to their Normal Form (Maretan like) and that these races were descendants of Kohan while in those forms. The Gauri being descendants of Drauga and Haroun inheriting qualities of both. In Kohan and its expansion pack Kohan: Ahriman's Gift, the player can gain control of Gauri, Drauga, Haroun and Slaan settlements and control units from these races, but the player's main settlements are always Mareten settlements. Instead of selecting a playable race, the player selects a faction which has units unique to it. Players of the Ceyah faction can produce Undead and Shadow units as well as Mareten settlers and engineers.

== Development ==
Kohan: Immortal Sovereigns was first mentioned in November 1999.

== Reception ==
Kohan: Immortal Sovereigns

Aggregate score
Aggregator	Score
Metacritic	87/100

Review scores
Publication	Score
AllGame	4.5/5
Computer Games Strategy Plus	5/5
Computer Gaming World	4/5
EP Daily	9/10
Eurogamer	8/10
GameRevolution	A−
GameSpot	8.6/10
GameSpy	85%
GameZone	8.5/10
IGN	8.5/10
Next Generation	3/5
PC Gamer (US)	88%
PC Zone	50%
X-Play	4/5

The game received "generally favorable reviews" according to the review aggregation website Metacritic. It was praised for eliminating much of the micromanagement inherent in real-time strategy games while introducing new concepts to the genre, and for the strong AI opponents and multiplayer support. It was criticized for the somewhat lackluster world, and the "inability to establish a distinctive atmosphere." John Lee of NextGen said of the game, "Innovation and simplicity are the super attributes here, and even if you've pretty much seen all this before, it's still quite a ride."

The Academy of Interactive Arts & Sciences nominated Kohan for the "PC Strategy" award in 2002, which ultimately went to Civilization III. However, the game won PC Gamer US' "Best Real-Time Strategy Game" and Computer Gaming World's "Best Strategy Game" awards that year, and was likewise named 2001's top real-time strategy game by Computer Games Magazine and GamePen. The staff of PC Gamer, Computer Gaming World and Computer Games Magazine praised the game's increased strategic depth compared to other real-time strategy titles. The game was nominated for the "Best Artificial Intelligence", "Most Innovative Game", "Best Single-Player Strategy Game", and "Best Multiplayer Strategy Game" awards at GameSpot's Best and Worst of 2001 Awards, which went to Black & White, Shattered Galaxy (twice), and Civilization III, respectively.

== Expansion ==
Kohan: Ahriman's Gift (known as Kohan: Battles of Ahriman in Europe) is a stand-alone expansion pack for Kohan released in November 2001. The game allows play from an evil perspective, with the player leading armies of Undead and Shadowbeasts. It introduces an improved AI, new units and three new campaigns, as well as some new multiplayer maps and modes. However, it was criticized for not bringing enough new features to justify its cost.

The main campaign of Ahriman's Gift serves as the prequel to the original game with the perspective from the evil Ceyah Kohan led by their champion Mistress Vashti, formerly Roxanna Javidan wife of Darius Javidan, the main protagonist of the original game. The Quest for Darius follows the story of Ilyana Aswan and her armies as she races against time and evil to recover the amulet of Darius Javidan, while the Slaanri campaign features the newly reawakened Slaanri champion, Slyy's Stok as he struggles to remember his past and unite the tribes of his people against an unknown enemy.

=== Reception ===
Kohan: Ahriman's Gift

Aggregate score
Aggregator	Score
Metacritic	79/100

Review scores
Publication	Score
AllGame	3.5/5
Computer Games Magazine	4.5/5
Computer Gaming World	4/5
EP Daily	7/10
GameSpot	7.7/10
GameSpy	68%
GameZone	8.3/10
IGN	8.3/10
PC Gamer (US)	79%
PC Zone	78%

Ahriman's Gift received "generally favorable reviews", although moderately less than the original Kohan, according to Metacritic.

== Port and sequel ==
The game was ported to Linux by Loki Software, shipping on August 24, 2001. A special edition was published in May 2002, featuring new heroes, maps and AI options, but not the expansion pack. A Kohan mod tool was released on June 17, 2002. A sequel, Kohan II: Kings of War, was released in 2004. A compilation, Kohan Warchest, is a download bundling the three Kohan titles Immortal Sovereigns, Ahriman's Gift, and Kings of War. It was released by Impulse in January 2011 and Steam in August 2011.
