= Brave: The Search for Spirit Dancer =

2005 video game

- Developer: VIS Entertainment (Note: Ported to the Xbox 360 and Wii by Collision Studios)
- Publishers: PlayStation 2: PAL: Sony Computer Entertainment; NA: Evolved Games; Xbox 360; Evolved Games; Wii; SouthPeak Games
- Platforms: PlayStation 2, Xbox 360, Wii
- Release: PlayStation 2: EU: September 2, 2005; AU: September 8, 2005; NA: April 3, 2007; Xbox 360: NA: August 4, 2009; PAL: September 25, 2009; Wii: NA: August 10, 2009; PAL: September 28, 2009
- Genre: Action-adventure
- Mode: Single-player

Brave: The Search for Spirit Dancer is a 2005 action-adventure platform game developed by VIS Entertainment for the PlayStation 2 and was later ported to the Xbox 360 and Wii under the name Brave: A Warrior's Tale in 2009. A PlayStation Portable version was planned, but was cancelled.

== Overview and gameplay ==
The game is set in a world of Native American mythology. It follows a young Native American boy named Brave embarking on a journey to save his tribe. Brave needs to find Spirit Dancer, a legendary shaman who disappeared a long time ago, to save his tribe from the evil Wendigo.

The main game features diverse levels, with Brave needing to make his way to the end of each level. Brave learns a number of attacks and skills as the player progresses through the game.

== Reception ==
Reception

Aggregate score
Aggregator	Score
Metacritic	(PS2) 65/100 (Wii) 48/100 (X360) 42/100

Review scores
Publication	Score
1Up.com	B
GameSpot	6.6/10 (PS2); 4.5/10
GamesRadar+	(PS2) 3.5/5 (X360) 1/5
GameZone	(PS2) 5.7/10 (X360) 5.5/10
IGN	(PS2) 5.1/10 (X360) 4.3/10
Nintendo World Report	5/10
Official U.S. PlayStation Magazine	5/10
Official Xbox Magazine (US)	6/10
PALGN	5.5/10
PlayStation: The Official Magazine	6/10
The Sydney Morning Herald	3/5

Brave: The Search for Spirit Dancer received "mixed" reviews according to video game review aggregator Metacritic. A Warrior's Tale, however, has received generally negative reviews on the site.

Chris Watters of GameSpot stated, "A cruelly hijacked story makes this otherwise serviceable game a pale shadow of adventures past." Watters gave the Xbox 360 version a score of 4.5/10.

Tom Price of TeamXbox called the game a "standard third-person action-adventure game" that "lacks all the charm of a Banjo-Kazooie type of world." Price also noticed several in-game bugs, stating, "I can’t tell you how many times I fell through solid objects or had the game completely freeze up on me." Price gave the game 2.5/10, accounting for its lowest rating.

Dylan Platt of GameZone gave the same version 5.5/10, saying, "In bringing the game to the 360 [from the PlayStation 2], Collision Studios added some pretty terrible new content, and not a small number of bugs and glitches." Platt also stated that, "The moment-to-moment gameplay of Brave's sequences are fairly fun (though bugs are far more frequent than they should be), but the beginning and ending Courage segments are frustrating, poorly designed, and ridiculously glitchy."
