= Pat Swindall =

American politician (1950–2018)

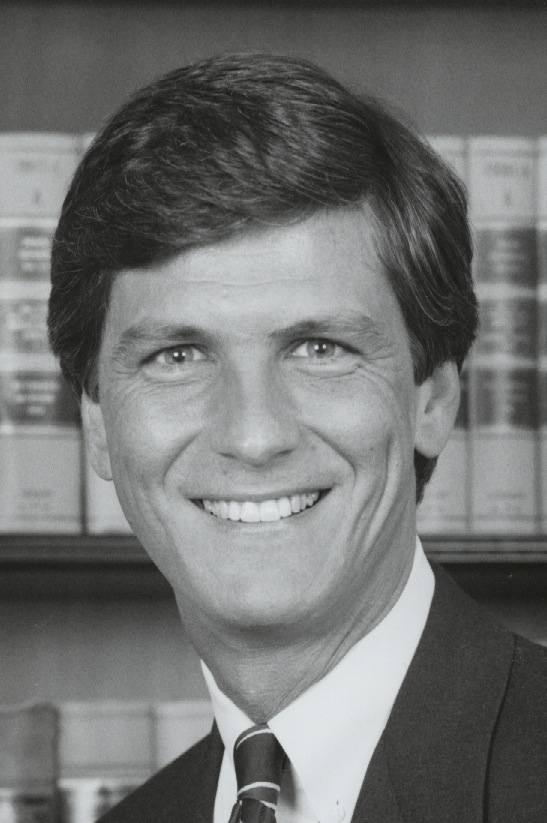

Member of the U.S. House of Representatives from Georgia's 4th district
- In office January 3, 1985 – January 3, 1989
- Preceded by: Elliott H. Levitas
- Succeeded by: Ben Jones

Personal details
- Born: Patrick Lynn Swindall; October 18, 1950 Gadsden, Alabama, U.S.
- Died: July 11, 2018 (aged 67) Johns Creek, Georgia, U.S.
- Party: Republican
- Spouse: Kimberly Swindall
- Children: 7
- Education: University of Georgia (BA, JD)

Patrick Lynn Swindall (October 18, 1950 – July 11, 2018) was an American politician, attorney, and businessman who served as a Republican member of the U.S. House of Representatives from Georgia's 4th congressional district, based in Atlanta's eastern suburbs, from 1985 to 1989.

== Education and career ==
Born in Gadsden, Alabama, as a youth Swindall worked in and later managed his father Nathan's Atlanta Furniture Store on the corner of Butler (today Jesse Hill Jr. Drive) and Decatur Streets. He earned a B.A. from the University of Georgia in 1972 and obtained his J.D. from the University of Georgia School of Law in 1975. After law school he practiced law with Heyman & Sizemore and, in April 1979, at the age of 28, became its youngest partner to that date. He practiced law in Atlanta until December 31, 1983, when he resigned to run for Congress.

In 1984, with Robb Austin as his campaign manager, Swindall defeated five term Democratic congressman Elliott H. Levitas by six percentage points, an upset election considering Levitas was elected with relative ease since his first election in 1974. He won by a similar margin against actor Ben L. Jones in 1986. However, after being indicted for perjury, Swindall lost in a rematch with Jones in 1988 by a 20-point margin.

Swindall voted against the Abandoned Shipwrecks Act of 1987. The Act asserts United States title to certain abandoned shipwrecks located on or embedded in submerged lands under state jurisdiction, and transfers title to the respective state, thereby empowering states to manage these cultural and historical resources more efficiently, with the goal of preventing treasure hunters and salvagers from damaging them. Despite his vote against it, President Ronald Reagan signed it into law on April 28, 1988.

== Perjury conviction ==
In October 1988, Swindall was indicted on ten counts of perjury related to a money laundering scheme. In recorded dealings with an undercover IRS agent posing as a representative of the Colombian drug cartel, Swindall was told that the $850,000 loan he was seeking to finish building his luxury home included illegal drug money and that he would be part of an operation to "wash" cash. Swindall proposed that an associate set up a mortgage company to funnel the money through.

During an ensuing investigation into the illegal drug trade, Swindall lied to a federal grand jury about his knowledge that the funds were from a drug trafficking operation, which was refuted by the undercover tapes. While one of the perjury charges was dismissed by District Judge Richard C. Freeman, the jury convicted Swindall on nine counts and sentenced him to one year in prison and a fine of $30,450. Swindall's friend, Congressman Barney Frank testified on Swindall's behalf.

On appeal, the Eleventh Circuit Court of Appeals overturned three of the counts, but the U.S. Supreme Court refused to overturn the remaining six and he began serving his one-year sentence in 1994. He was disbarred by the Supreme Court of Georgia in 1996.

== Later life ==
Upon his release from prison on February 9, 1995, Swindall hosted a religious-themed conservative radio show on the Providence Broadcasting Network. His show's motto was "Where religion and politics converge." When the Providence Broadcasting Network ceased operations, Swindall announced that he was going to "pursue a prison ministry." Swindall was the owner of multiple businesses in Atlanta and College Park.

In June 2009, a Fulton County grand jury indicted Swindall and two of his fired employees for making illegal campaign contributions to Atlanta City Councilwoman Joyce Sheperd. The businessmen were indicted for making false statements because Swindall was the actual source of the contributions not as reported on Sheperd's campaign disclosure forms as coming from other people, including family and friends of the two former employees. In 2011 the charges were reduced from the felony charges to three misdemeanors. Swindall pleaded no contest to two counts of exceeding the maximum allowable campaign contribution and one count of conspiracy to commit a crime and was sentenced one year of probation.

In November 2009, he was involved in a confrontation with former tenants at a flea market location he owned and had formerly leased to them; Swindall left after College Park code enforcement officers and police arrived. He wanted to remove the walls that delineate the individual stalls within the flea market. Swindall also wanted to remove other structures belonging to him, but the request was denied by the College Park Police.

Swindall was married to former Duke University cheerleader Kimberly Schiesser; together they had seven children. During his time in Congress the two were called the "Barbie and Ken of Politics".

== Death ==
Swindall died in his sleep on July 11, 2018, at his home in Johns Creek, Georgia, of an undisclosed cause. He was 67.

== See also ==
- List of American federal politicians convicted of crimes
- List of federal political scandals in the United States
- Bob Barr

== Books ==
- A House Divided: A Congressman Examines the Divisive Issues That Face America, (1987). ISBN 0-8407-9079-1

U.S. House of Representatives
Preceded by Elliott H. Levitas	Member of the U.S. House of Representatives from Georgia's 4th congressional district 1985–1989	Succeeded by Ben Jones
