= Mitchum (surname) =

Mitchum is a surname. Notable people with the surname include:

- Bentley Mitchum (born 1967), American actor and grandson of Robert Mitchum
- Christopher Mitchum (born 1943), American actor and 2nd son of Robert Mitchum
- James Mitchum (1941–2025), American actor and eldest son of Robert Mitchum
- John Mitchum (1919–2001), American actor and younger brother of Robert Mitchum
- Julie Mitchum (1914–2003), American actress and elder sister of Robert Mitchum
- Junie Mitchum (born 1973), West Indian cricketer
- Robert Mitchum (1917–1997), American actor
- Timothy Mitchum (born 1992), American actor and singer

== See also ==
- Mitchum, a brand of deodorant
- Mitcham (disambiguation)
