= The Ballad of Thunder Road =

Song by Robert Mitchum
- B-side: "My Honey's Lovin' Arms"
- Published: 1958
- Released: May 1958
- Genre: Country
- Composer(s): Jack Marshall
- Lyricist(s): Robert Mitchum
- Producer(s): Lee Gillette

"The Ballad of Thunder Road" is a song performed and co-written by actor Robert Mitchum in 1958, with music by composer Jack Marshall. It was the theme song of the movie Thunder Road. The song made the Billboard Hot 100 twice, in 1958 and 1962, and while it never peaked higher than number 62, it racked up 21 total weeks in the chart. The song moves ominously between minor and major keys.

== Background ==
It tells the tale of "Lucas Doolin" (Robert Mitchum), a bootlegger during the 1950s, who would deliver moonshine along local roads at excessive speeds to avoid "revenuers".

After receiving word (on April 1, 1954) that the revenuers had "200 agents, covering the state", Lucas' father advises him to "make this run your last", and that he should not attempt to outrun the revenuers, but if he could not get through safely, to turn himself in. However, Lucas ignores his father's request, and attempts to outrun the law, but fails to evade them and dies as a result (the last lines read: "Then right outside of Bearden, they made the fatal strike./He left the road at 90, that's all there is to say/The Devil got the moonshine and the mountain boy that day").

Mitchum got the tune for the song from a Norwegian folk-dance ("Gammel Reinlender") song his mother used to sing to him. He also played the bootlegger in the movie.

Bluegrass performers Jim & Jesse (McReynolds) brought the song to the national country charts in the fall of 1967.

The song in the movie soundtrack itself is a softer, more ballad-like version than the hit single recorded by Mitchum, and was sung by Randy Sparks.

== Reception ==
Addie Moore of Wide Open Country compared Mitchum's songwriting to the storytelling of Western singer-songwriters Johnny Horton and Marty Robbins, stating the song's staying power "opened the door for Mitchum to briefly become one of the celebrity toasts of Tennessee."
