= Moonrunners =

1975 film by Gy Waldron

- Theatrical release poster
- Directed by: Gy Waldron
- Written by: Gy Waldron
- Produced by: Robert B. Clark
- Starring: James Mitchum; Kiel Martin; Arthur Hunnicutt; Waylon Jennings
- Cinematography: Brian W. Roy
- Edited by: William Chulack; Avrum Fine
- Music by: Waylon Jennings
- Distributed by: United Artists
- Release date: May 14, 1975
- Running time: 110 minutes
- Country: United States
- Language: English

Moonrunners is a 1975 action comedy film starring James Mitchum, about a Southern family that runs bootleg liquor. It was reworked four years later into the popular long-running television series The Dukes of Hazzard, and the two productions share some similarities. Mitchum had co-starred with his father, Robert Mitchum, in the similar drive-in favorite Thunder Road 18 years earlier, which also focused upon moonshine-running bootleggers using fast cars to elude federal agents. Moonrunners, a B movie, was filmed in 1973 and awaited release for over a year. Its soundtrack reflects the outlaw music boom of the 1970s during which the film was released.

The film was written and directed by Gy Waldron and is based on the life and stories of ex-moonshiner Jerry Rushing, who has a small role in the movie as a heavy at the Boar's Nest bar. It is listed in the book The Greatest Movie Car Chases of All Time.

== Plot ==
The story is narrated by the Balladeer, who introduces and comments on the story of cousins, Grady and Bobby Lee Hagg, who run bootleg liquor for their uncle Jesse Hagg of Shiloh County.

Uncle Jesse is a Baptist who knows the Bible better than the local preacher. He has been a widower since Aunt Libby died 10 years ago. He still makes liquor, according to his "granddaddy's granddaddy's" recipe, in stills named Molly and Beulah. Every drop is aged two years, and bottled in glass (never plastic). The Haggs have been making their recipe since before the American Revolutionary War, and Jesse only sells to a friend in nearby Florence to ensure that his liquor is never blended with any other.

Bobby Lee (also called "Lee") is a smart-mouthed schemer, named after Confederate General Robert E. Lee. In the opening, Bobby Lee is placed in the Pikkens County jail for a bar fight at the Boar's Nest. On his way home, he helps Beth Ann Eubanks, who is on the run from family trouble in Mississippi. Uncle Jesse lodges her at his home, and Lee courts her. Grady is a laconic "Romeo" who drives their 1955 Chevrolet stock car (#54, named Traveller after General Lee's horse). Grady is briefly mentioned as probably having a number of children around Shiloh and Tennessee.

The cousins take Beth to the next race at the local track. The other stock-car drivers include "good ol' boy" Zeebo, and Zeebo's lackey Cooter Pettigrew. Zeebo (driving #31) and Cooter (driving #28) team up to beat Grady in the race, leading to a moonlit bootlegger road race between Bobby Lee and Zeebo.

The county boss is Jake Rainey, a friend of Jesse's from the old days, when they both bootlegged for Jesse's father in 1934, and owner of the local bar and brothel. Jake has control of all the other moonshine in the county, and sells it to the New York syndicate (mob). He needs Jesse's supply to fill an order, but Jesse will not sell to Jake, since he would mix it with lesser-quality liquor.

To get at Jesse's supply, Jake uses Sheriff Rosco Coltrane to harass the cousins. At the same time, he uses Zeebo and Reba (Jake's wife who is having an affair with Grady) to goad the boys into a trap. During these events, Uncle Jesse calls Jake "hog" as a put-down. Uncle Jesse dies after completing a moonshine run. The cousins, who are on probation and cannot own guns, use a bow with explosive arrows to put Jake Rainey's moonshining factory out of business.

== Cast ==
- James Mitchum as Grady Hagg
- Kiel Martin as Bobby Lee Hagg
- Arthur Hunnicutt as Uncle Jesse Hagg
- Chris Forbes as Beth Ann Eubanks
- George Ellis as Jake Rainey
- Pete Munro as "Zeebo"
- Joan Blackman as Reba Rainey
- Waylon Jennings as The Balladeer
- Spanky McFarlane as "Precious"
- Joey Giordello as Syndicate Man
- Happy Humphrey as "Tiny"
- Bill Gribble as "Cooter" Pettigrew
- Bruce Atkins as Sheriff Rosco Coltrane
- Ben Jones as Agent Fred
- Jerry Rushing as Bodyguard

== Production ==
Moonrunners was filmed during the fall of 1973 in Williamson and Haralson, Georgia.

== Legacy ==
Several names, places, and situations from the film were used in The Dukes of Hazzard, with little or no alteration. Waylon Jennings is the Balladeer, and the Boar's Nest is a tavern in both. Although toned down for the TV series, the relationship between cousins Bo (John Schneider) and Luke Duke (Tom Wopat) is similar to that of Bobby Lee (Kiel Martin) and Grady Hagg (James Mitchum) in Moonrunners. Similarly to Grady in the film, in the pilot episode of The Dukes of Hazzard, "One Armed Bandits", Bo half-jokes that half of the children in the local orphanage could be his cousin Luke's, although this and similar concepts were quickly dropped as the series found its more family-friendly tone

In both Moonrunners and The Dukes of Hazzard, Uncle Jesse (played by Arthur Hunnicutt in the film and Denver Pyle in the series) is the family patriarch. In both, he is a widowed, bearded moonshiner with strong religious beliefs, raising his nephews. They dress similarly, in overalls and a shirt. The film and series feature a corrupt county boss (Jake Rainey and Boss Hogg) who ran moonshine with Uncle Jesse, owns many local businesses, and bribes local law enforcement. Their opposing views and Jake (George Ellis)'s dishonesty make the Haggses and Rainey adversaries, as the Dukes and Boss Hogg (Sorrell Booke) were in the series. Sheriff Rosco P. Coltrane is a once-honest officer who turned to corruption with the county boss after he was cheated out of his pension. This theme carried over to the end of the first season of the series. Much of the Balladeer's dialogue introducing Rosco (Bruce Atkins) in Moonrunners is similar to that in Rosco (James Best)'s first scene in the first episode of The Dukes of Hazzard. In the film and series, the boys have a talented mechanic friend, Virgil in the film and Cooter Davenport (Ben Jones) in the series. On probation for running moonshine, they use hunting bows tipped with dynamite since they are forbidden to use firearms.

Other names or roles were altered, while retaining recognizable connections. In the film, Uncle Jesse and the boys have the surname Hagg; in the series, their antagonist's surname is Hogg. In Moonrunners, Beth Ann Eubanks (Chris Forbes) is an honest, naïve young woman in trouble who is taken in by the Haggs; the character resembles Daisy Duke (Catherine Bach), a member of the family. The Haggs' stock car is named Traveller after General Robert E. Lee's horse, and the Dukes' stock car is named The General Lee. Jake Rainey is said to have organized-crime connections, and in early episodes of the TV series, Boss Hogg attempts to ally with a syndicate. Uncle Jesse's mule in the film is named Beauregard, a name which would be given to Bo (Beauregard) Duke in the series.

These actors appeared in both Moonrunners and The Dukes of Hazzard:

- Ben Jones as Fred (a revenue agent) in the film and the Dukes' best friend, Cooter Davenport, in the series
- C. Pete Munro as Zeebo in the film and Willie in the season two episode "Jude Emery"
- Bill Gribble as Cooter in the film and Carson in the second episode, "Daisy's Song"
- Jerry Rushing as Jake Rainey's bodyguard in the film and crooked used-car salesman Ace Parker in the fourth episode, "Repo Men"

== See also ==
- List of American films of 1975
