= Jake Spanner, Private Eye =

- Written by: Andrew J. Fenady
- Story by: L.A. Morse
- Directed by: Lee H. Katzin
- Starring: Robert Mitchum; Ernest Borgnine
- Music by: Jimmie Haskell
- Original language: English

Production
- Producers: John Vinnedge; Syd Vinnedge
- Cinematography: Héctor R. Figueroa
- Editor: Dann Cahn

Original release
- Release: 1989

Jake Spanner, Private Eye is a 1989 American television crime film written and directed by Lee H. Katzin and starring Robert Mitchum and Ernest Borgnine.

The supporting cast features Stella Stevens, Sheree North, John Mitchum, James Mitchum, Edie Adams, Terry Moore, Nita Talbot and Kareem Abdul-Jabbar.

== Cast ==
- Robert Mitchum as Jake Spanner
- Ernest Borgnine as Sal Piccolo
- Stella Stevens as Sandra Summers
- Dick Van Patten as The Commodore
- Sheree North as Mrs. Bernstein
- Laurie Lathem as Toni New
- John Mitchum as J.P. Spanner
- Richard Yniguez as Ben Nunez
- James Mitchum as Lieutenant Kevin Spanner
- Edie Adams as Senior Club Member
- Terry Moore as Sally
- Clive Revill as Herbert Soames
- Nita Talbot as Nurse
- Kenneth Kimmins as Wellington Warren
- Kareem Abdul-Jabbar as Man at Sal's House
- Julius Carry as Lenny
- Edy Williams as Sun Haven Lady

== Reception ==
Chicago Sun-Times' critic Daniel Ruth referred to the film as "far from a perfect movie", "marred by modest production" and with a fairly predictable plot, but praised the performance of Mitchum, writing he delivered " a marvelous performance", appearing "rejuvenated, sprightly and animated in a comfortable role".
