= Mitcham, Australia =

Mitcham, Australia may refer to:

- Mitcham, South Australia, a suburb of Adelaide, South Australia
- Mitcham, Victoria, a suburb of Melbourne, Victoria

== See also ==
- Mitcham (disambiguation)
