= Michtam =

Michtam may refer to:

- Miktam, a title used in six of the Psalms
- a planet in the science fiction video game series Xenosaga.

== See also ==
- Mitcham (disambiguation)
