= Jerry Rushing =

American bootlegger (1937–2017)

Jerry Elijah Rushing (September 1, 1937 – July 23, 2017) was an American best known for his years as a bootlegger or "moonrunner" (moonshine runner, "running" being a form of smuggling).

Rushing was born into a family business making illegal whiskey. As a young man he became a delivery driver, a job requiring late-night high-speed driving, often without headlights; for this he used a modified 1958 Chrysler 300D capable of 140 mph (225 km/h) speeds, easily more than most police vehicles, which he nicknamed Traveller, after Robert E. Lee's favorite horse Traveller. The car was eventually abandoned when it ran out of fuel during a chase, was sold from a police impound into the private collector's market, and has since been restored by Lawrence Wolfel. Rushing eventually turned to a career in early stock car racing. Among the drivers he raced were Junior Johnson, himself a former moonrunner, and Wendell Scott.

In the early 1970s, while doing research for an upcoming movie, producer Gy Waldron obtained an oral history from Rushing. Waldron would later use these interviews, along with his own experiences growing up in Kentucky, as material for the 1975 B-movie Moonrunners, which would go on to be reworked as the basis for the TV series The Dukes of Hazzard (1979–1985). Rushing was not credited for the biographical details he claims were recreated in both works, and sued for royalties, receiving an undisclosed settlement.

Rushing claims thirteen characters from the film or series were modeled on himself or people he knew, including:

- He was the inspiration for Bo Duke
- His Uncle Worley was the inspiration for Uncle Jesse
- His car Traveler was the inspiration for the General Lee (indeed, a car named Traveler is seen in Moonrunners, and the name for the General Lee in pre-production was also Traveler)

Rushing performed stunt work and appeared uncredited as Jake Rainey's bodyguard in Moonrunners. He also had a guest role in a very early episode of the Dukes series, as crooked used car salesman Ace Parker in the episode "Repo Men". Rushing had understood the performance to be the start of a recurring role, return in part for his supplying creative material from his experiences, but it was the only time the character was ever seen or mentioned. This appearance led to a career as a minor character actor, mainly playing rednecks, sheriffs, and truckers. With the release of the Dukes of Hazzard movie, Rushing had stepped up marketing for a self-produced documentary called Traveler.

Rushing owned and operated a wild boar hunting preserve near Taylorsville, North Carolina named Chestnut Hunting Lodge. He retired during the summer of 2013 and the lodge closed. He died at his home on July 23, 2017.
