= Thunder Road (1958 film) =

1958 film by Arthur Ripley

- Theatrical poster
- Directed by: Arthur Ripley
- Screenplay by: James Atlee Phillips; Walter Wise
- Story by: Robert Mitchum
- Produced by: Robert Mitchum
- Starring: Robert Mitchum; Gene Barry; Jacques Aubuchon
- Cinematography: David Ettenson; Alan Stensvold
- Edited by: Harry Marker
- Music by: Jack Marshall; Robert Mitchum
- Production company: D.R.M. Productions
- Distributed by: United Artists
- Release date: May 10, 1958 (US)
- Running time: 93 minutes
- Country: United States
- Language: English
- Box office: $1 million

Thunder Road is a 1958 American Southern Gothic film noir directed by Arthur Ripley and written by James Atlee Phillips and Walter Wise, who based the screenplay on an original story by Robert Mitchum. Mitchum based the story told to him by writer and friend James Agee regarding an alleged incident that occurred in Knoxville, Tennessee involving a bootlegger transporting moonshine being pursued by law enforcement along a section of highway from Harlan, Kentucky to Knoxville known infamously as "Thunder Road."

Considered his passion project, Mitchum independently produced the film and starred in the lead role of Lucas Doolin, a Korean War veteran who returns to his East Tennessee countryside home to operate his family's moonshining operations while confronting federal revenuers seeking to shut his operations down and urban mobsters seeking to take over control of bootlegging in the Appalachia region. The film features Gene Barry as U.S. Treasury agent Troy Barrett and Jacques Aubuchon as Memphis mob boss Carl Kogan for the film's antagonists.

Despite an initial lackluster box-office release, Thunder Road later became a cult film and a staple of drive-in movie theaters in the Southern United States from its release and into the 1980s. Additionally, the film became further embedded in popular culture when its name was used as the title of a song by Bruce Springsteen, having been inspired by the poster of the film and having served as an inspiration for later released "bootlegger films" such as Moonrunners, Smokey and the Bandit, and Moonshine Highway.

== Plot ==
In Rillow Valley, Tennessee, Lucas "Luke" Doolin works in the family moonshine business, running illegal liquor his father distills to clandestine distribution points throughout the American South in his hot rod Ford. However, Lucas has more problems than evading government "revenuers".

Both a hothead and a fatalist, he is concerned that his teen-aged younger brother Robin, who is also his mechanic, will be tempted into following in his footsteps. An aggressive urban gangster, Carl Kogan is trying to gain control of the independent local moonshine producers and their distribution points. Dead shiners strewn along Thunder Road prove he is willing to kill anyone who stands in his way. Determined Treasury agent Troy Barrett is drawn in to stop the bloodshed, and its cause.

Barrett's attempt to engage Lucas are thrown right back in his face. The stakes rise when an attempt by Kogan to kill Lucas results in the deaths of another moonshine driver, Jed Moultrie, and Treasury Agent Mike Williams mistaken for him and one of Barrett's men.

Still, Lucas does not back off, a stubbornness and strike-first hostility attributed by townsfolk to a "machine-gunner's mentality" they feel he brought home from the Korean War, which pervades his every doing. Only with nightclub singer Francie Wymore can he drop his guard, as far as he is able. At the same time, he steadfastly resists the attentions of the belle of the mountain girls, innocent Roxanna Ledbetter, who has a crush on him and fears for his life.

When a series of government raids destroy local moonshiners' hidden stills, Lucas's father and the others shut down production "for a spell" to let the government deal with Kogan in its own time. In spite of this, Lucas is forced by circumstances and his own code of honor to make one final run of his dad's shine.

Kogan's men successfully trick Robin into agreeing to drive for them, infuriating Lucas, who sends Robin home on the bus. Barrett tries to enlist Robin's help in convincing Lucas it's Kogan his Bureau is after, not his brother, but is rebuffed. In the exchange Barrett reveals Lucas never left the States in the Army and implies he may have spent his hitch in its stockade instead, explaining his pent-up anger and seeming death wish.

After Lucas meets with Francie and forebodingly gives her a large sum of money to hold for him, he calls Kogan to let him know he is coming to kill him for trying to set up his brother. Meanwhile, Roxanna spills all she knows about Lucas's intended final moonshine run – for now, anyway, till things sort out – to agent Barrett's wife when she can't contact Barrett directly. He deploys a sweeping dragnet of Bureau men and state police in an attempt to intercept Lucas before he gets caught, or killed, in Kogan's trap.

Kogan sends his top henchman after Lucas just before Barrett and his officers arrive and arrest Kogan for murder. Lucas turns the tables on Kogan's driver and runs him off the road. Kogan's men then set spike strips to blow out Lucas's tires, which send his car careening down an embankment into an arcing electrical transformer. Barrett arrives too late to help with anything.

As a snake of headlights winds up the lonely mountain road back home, Robin and Roxanna stand alone in silence. The same cortege of mourners bring their own back home as when a local boy was taken out by Kogan's men early in the conflict. As the glows draw closer Robin and Roxanne approach one another slowly. Without a word they clasp hands and walk away together into the dark.

== Cast ==
- Robert Mitchum as Lucas "Luke" Doolin
- Gene Barry as Troy Barrett
- Jacques Aubuchon as Carl Kogan
- Keely Smith as Francie Wymore
- Trevor Bardette as Vernon Doolin
- Sandra Knight as Roxanna Ledbetter
- James Mitchum as Robin Doolin
- Peter Breck as Stacey Gouge, a rival driver
- Mitchell Ryan as Jed Moultrie, a decoy driver
- Dale Van Sickel as Mike Williams (uncredited)
- Francis Koon as Sarah Doolin (uncredited)

== Production ==
The film was the first independent production of Mitchum's own company, D.R.M. Productions, but no producer was credited.

The film was based loosely on an incident in which a driver transporting moonshine was said to have crashed to his death on Kingston Pike in Knoxville, Tennessee, between Bearden Hill and Morrell Road. Per Metro Pulse writer Jack Renfro, the incident occurred in 1952 and may have been witnessed by James Agee, who passed the story on to Mitchum. The character of Lucas Doolin, was also inspired by Rufus Gunter, a moonshiner and stock car racer from Cocke County, Tennessee who was killed in 1953 after running his car into the Holston River in eastern Knox County, Tennessee during a police chase. Gunter's mother had allowed representatives of Mitchum to adapt the story of her son for the film.

=== Casting ===
The part of Lucas's younger brother, Robin, was originally written for Elvis Presley per Mitchum's request. Mitchum personally submitted the script to Elvis in Los Angeles. The singer was eager to play the role, but his manager, Colonel Tom Parker, demanded Elvis be paid a ridiculous sum of money, more than the entire budget for the movie, which ended negotiations. Mitchum's elder son, James, who strongly resembled his father, got the part instead. It was his first credited film role.

=== Filming ===
Filming took place entirely on location primarily in the Western North Carolina counties of Buncombe and Transylvania, starting in August of 1957 under the working title "Jack O'Diamonds." Additional scenes were shot in Lake Lure in Rutherford County. Filming wrapped in early October of 1957.

Nearly 500 locals around the Asheville area were hired for the production of the film. Mitchum and his production crew rented out the entire Battery Park Hotel during the filming.

The urban locale scenes were filmed around Asheville, North Carolina, with the nightclub scenes taking place at the Sky Club atop Beaucatcher Mountain,

Most of the farm and rural chase scenes were filmed around the Reems Creek area near Woodfin, North Carolina, along U.S. Route 19. Some scenes were filmed in Beech, east of Weaverville. Some scenes were actual local moonshine drivers shot with a camera mounted on a pickup tailgate.

The film's stunts were coordinated by Carey Loftin who performed most of the car crash sequences such as the car fall at Toxaway Falls near Gorges State Park and the final substation collision scene. Robert Mitchum broke his angle performing his own stunt jumping from second story window onto a flatbed truck.

The cars utilized by Mitchum's character for stunts in the film: both Ford Customs, were supplied from actual bootleggers in the area, containing custom installed tanks in the rear of the cars used to contain moonshine.

=== Music ===
The film's theme song, "The Whippoorwill", was sung by Keely Smith in her role as a nightclub singer, and a different studio rendition by her was released as a 45 rpm single on Capitol Records. Mitchum wrote the music with lyrics by Don Raye. The film's opening song, also co-written by Mitchum, is "The Ballad of Thunder Road", sung by Randy Sparks, a different arrangement of which was recorded by Mitchum and released as a popular 45 rpm single, also on Capitol.

== Reception ==
=== Initial reviews ===
A contemporary review by "Whit." of Variety said it was "Burdened with an overage of dialog and an abundance of uneventful footage", but it had "plenty of fast auto action".

=== Retrospective reviews ===
During a preview of the film during a film noir festival, Ryan Stewart of Cinematical praised the film's attention of authenticity of the portrayal of Appalachian sociology and the car chase sequences despite the film's poor direction, stating: "Thunder Road is more entertaining on more levels than any B-picture has a right to be."

In 2025, The Hollywood Reporter listed Thunder Road as having the best stunts of 1958.

== In popular culture ==
Thunder Road has been referenced in several forms of media after its release. American singer-songwriter Bruce Springsteen stated during a 1978 live performance that he had used the film's name for the opening track to his 1975 breakthrough album, Born to Run, having been inspired by the theatrical poster for the film, despite not actually seeing the movie. In the season 2 episode, "And Coachie Makes Three," of the American sitcom Cheers, characters Sam and Coach watch the film as part of a long-running tradition of watching Robert Mitchum movies whenever they are on television.

The final crash scene that takes the life of Lucas Doolin was utilized in later films such as the 1968 Made-for-TV science fiction film They Saved Hitler's Brain, and the 1995 science fiction-horror film Species.

== See also ==
- List of American films of 1958
