= Enemy (1990 film) =

- DVD cover
- Directed by: George Rowe
- Screenplay by: Peter Fonda; Chosei Funahara; Anthony Gentile; John Gentile; George Rowe
- Produced by: Chosei Funahara; Franz Harland; Takahide Kawakami
- Starring: Peter Fonda; Tia Carrere; Mako
- Cinematography: Phil Parmet
- Edited by: Branka Mrkic
- Music by: Mark Winner
- Production company: Antennafilms
- Distributed by: Anchor Bay Entertainment
- Release date: July 25, 1990 (USA)
- Running time: 84 minutes
- Country: United States
- Language: English

Enemy (also known as Fatal Mission) is a 1990 American action/adventure film directed by George Rowe and starring Peter Fonda, who also co-wrote the screenplay.

== Plot ==
A CIA agent posing as a journalist assassinates a North Vietnamese official then escapes into the jungle, where he comes across a beautiful female spy. At first they're enemies, but come to the realization that they must work together if they want to get out alive.

== Cast ==
- Peter Fonda as Ken Andrews
- Tia Carrere as Mai Chang
- Mako as Trang
- James Mitchum as Maj. Bauer

== Production ==
Enemy was filmed in the Philippines in 1988.
