= James Mitchum =

American actor (1941–2025)

- Born: James Robin Spence Mitchum; May 8, 1941; Los Angeles, California, U.S.
- Died: September 20, 2025 (aged 84); Skull Valley, Arizona, U.S.
- Occupation: Actor
- Years active: 1949–1992
- Spouse: Wende Wagner (m. 1967; div. 1978)
- Children: 1
- Parent(s): Robert Mitchum; Dorothy Spence
- Relatives: Julie Mitchum (aunt); John Mitchum (uncle); Christopher Mitchum (brother); Bentley Mitchum (nephew)

James Robin Spence Mitchum (May 8, 1941 – September 20, 2025) was an American actor.

== Background ==
Mitchum was born in Los Angeles, California, on May 8, 1941, the elder son of actor Robert Mitchum (whom he closely resembled) and his wife, Dorothy Spence. His brother was actor Christopher Mitchum, and he was the uncle of actor Bentley Mitchum. His only child was born during his marriage to actress Wende Wagner (1941–1997).

Mitchum died from a long illness at his ranch in Skull Valley, Arizona, on September 20, 2025, at the age of 84.

== Film career ==
Mitchum had his first, unbilled, role, at the age of eight in the Western Colorado Territory (1949) with Joel McCrea, Virginia Mayo, and Dorothy Malone. His credited debut was in Thunder Road (1958), in which he played his father's much younger brother, a role written for Elvis Presley, who was eager to do it until his manager demanded too much money. The film became a drive-in cult favorite, revived in the 1970s and ’80s. Mitchum was again credited as being "introduced" in the Have Gun Will Travel flashback episode "Genesis" (season 6, episode 1, 1962).

He appeared in more than 30 films including The Beat Generation in 1959; The Victors in 1963; as a surfer named Eskimo in Ride the Wild Surf in 1964; In Harm's Way (1965) with John Wayne, Kirk Douglas, and Henry Fonda. He also had a credited supporting role in The Money Trap (1965), where he played a police detective. The film starred Glenn Ford, Elke Sommer, Rita Hayworth and Joseph Cotten.

In 1964 Mitchum had the lead in a Spaghetti Western, Grand Canyon Massacre; the following year was Ambush Bay (1966) with Hugh O'Brian and Mickey Rooney, in which he received third billing of three names above the title. He played the villain in The Invincible Six (1970), then appeared in Two-Lane Blacktop (1971); and The Last Movie (1971).

In 1975, he returned to lead roles when he starred as Grady Hagg in the movie Moonrunners, the premise of which was later redeveloped into the television series The Dukes of Hazzard. He was also in Zebra Force and Trackdown co-starring Karen Lamm and Erik Estrada in 1976; The Ransom (a. k. a. Assault on Paradise) (1977); Blackout (1978); Monstroid (1980); Crazy Jungle Adventure (1982); Code Name Zebra (1987); Hollywood Cop (1987); Jake Spanner, Private Eye (1989); and Fatal Mission (1990).

== Music career ==
In 1961, Mitchum recorded the single "Lonely Teardrops" for Candix Records. The single also appeared on 20th Fox Records. Billboard Music Week noted the single in its Moderate Sales Potential section. The following year, Mitchum recorded "Toast of the Teardrop" for Reprise Records. The single was also noted by Billboard in its Moderate Sales Potential section.
