= The Ransom (1977 film) =

1977 American thriller film directed by Richard Compton

- Directed by: Richard Compton
- Written by: John C. Broderick; Ronald Silkosky
- Produced by: Bond Denson Ferrell; Patrick Ferrell; James V. Hart; John M. Hawn; Peter Macgregor-Scott; Roger Corman
- Starring: Oliver Reed; Deborah Raffin; Stuart Whitman; James Mitchum
- Cinematography: Charles Correll
- Edited by: Tina Hirsch
- Music by: Don Ellis
- Production companies: Inter-Ocean Films; Sunset Productions
- Distributed by: New World Pictures
- Release date: April 29, 1977
- Running time: 90 minutes
- Country: United States
- Language: English

The Ransom is a 1977 American thriller film directed by Richard Compton and starring Oliver Reed, Deborah Raffin, Stuart Whitman and James Mitchum. It is also known by the alternative titles Assault on Paradise and Maniac.

== Cast ==
- Oliver Reed as Nick McCormick
- Deborah Raffin as Cindy Simmons
- Stuart Whitman as William Whitaker
- James Mitchum as Tracker
- John Ireland as Chief Haliburton
- Paul Koslo as Victor
- Arch Archambault as Insp. Davey
- Robert Lussier as Wolf
- Dennis Redfield as Jackson
- Kipp Whitman as Officer Steiner
- Bill Allen as Carson the Butler
- Daniel Knapp as T.J. Caulfield

== Production ==
In a 1978 interview with the Los Angeles Times, co-screenwriter Ronald Silkosky said that the film had been heavily trimmed by New World Pictures prior to release.

== Release ==
The film was rereleased several times with titles such as Assault on Paradise, Maniac, The Town That Cried Terror and Night Hunter.

An extended 104-minute alternate version is included as a bonus feature on the Blu-ray disc release of the film by Code Red.

== Bibliography ==
- Alastair Phillips & Ginette Vincendeau. Journeys of desire: European actors in Hollywood : a critical companion. BFI, 2006.
