= John Mitchum =

American film actor and musician (1919–2001)

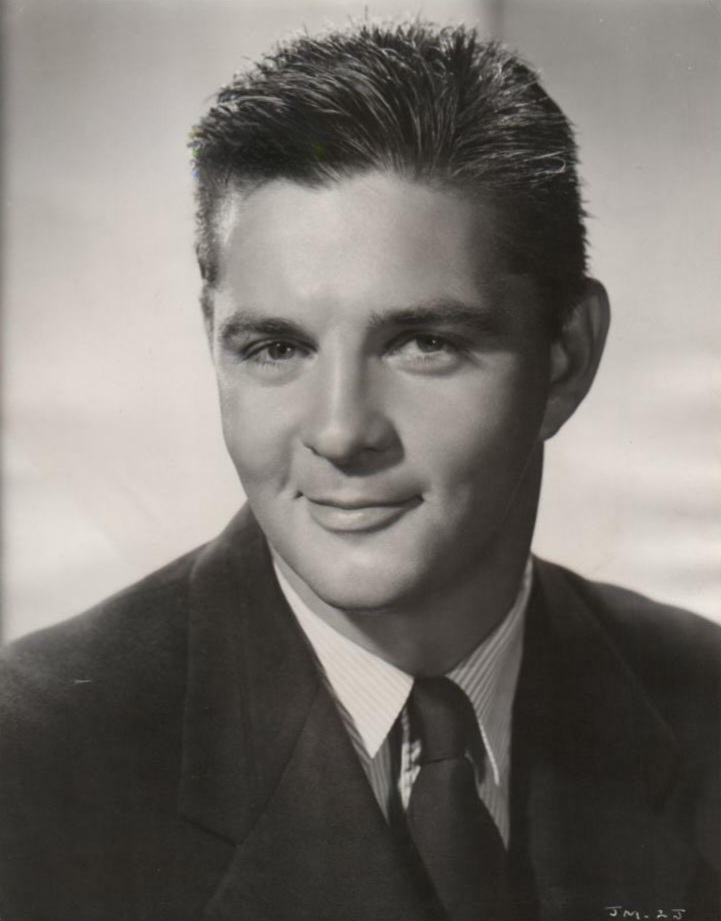
- Mitchum in 1951
- Born: September 6, 1919; Bridgeport, Connecticut, U.S.
- Died: November 29, 2001 (aged 82); Los Angeles, California, U.S.
- Occupations: Actor; musician
- Years active: 1947–1990
- Spouse(s): Joy Grahame Hallward (m. 19??; div. 19??) Nancy Munro (m. 1952; died 1976) Dorothy Woodward (m. 1976; div. 1985) Bonnie Duff (m. 1986)
- Children: 3
- Relatives: Julie Mitchum (sister); Robert Mitchum (brother); James Mitchum (nephew); Christopher Mitchum (nephew); Bentley Mitchum (great-nephew); Grace Van Dien (great-niece)

John Mitchum (September 6, 1919 – November 29, 2001) was an American actor from the 1940s to the 1970s in film and television. The younger brother of the actor Robert Mitchum, he was credited as Jack Mitchum early in his career.

== Early years ==
Mitchum was born in Bridgeport, Connecticut, to Ann Harriet Mitchum (née Gunderson) and James Thomas Mitchum, who had been killed in a railyard accident seven months earlier. He was the younger brother of Julie Mitchum and Robert Mitchum. He served in the United States Army, 361st Harbor Craft Company, in Florida and Hawaii.

== Career ==
Mitchum initially appeared unbilled in (e.g., Flying Leathernecks, RKO 1951) and extra roles before gradually receiving bigger character parts. He supported his more famous brother on several occasions, and became known as the friendly, food-loving Inspector Frank DiGiorgio in the first three Dirty Harry films. His character was killed in the third film, The Enforcer.

In 1957, he had a short appearance on Gunsmoke as a dueling cowboy in the episode "Sweet and Sour" (S2E23). He returned two years later, portraying "Joe" in "The Constable" (S4E37) and again in 1963 as "Wills" in "Two of a Kind" (S8E27).

In 1958, Mitchum was cast in two episodes of the crime drama Richard Diamond, Private Detective, starring David Janssen. He played Joe in the episode "Short Haul" and Jimmy Logan in "Bungalow Murder".

On September 15, 1959, Mitchum appeared in the premiere episode "Stage Stop" of the Western series Laramie.

Mitchum was cast in 1960 as Pickalong in 10 episodes of the Western series Riverboat, starring Darren McGavin. The same year, he appeared in the Western series The Rebel, starring Nick Adams. He also appeared as Hal Swanson in the 1960 episode "Silver Killers" of the Western series Tombstone Territory. Mitchum appeared in the 1960 Tales of Wells Fargo episode, "A Show for Silver Lode", in the role of a Wells Fargo station agent. From 1965 to 1967, Mitchum had the recurring role of Trooper Hoffenmueller in 11 episodes of the sitcom F Troop, starring Forrest Tucker, Larry Storch, and Ken Berry. In the 1967 episode of Batman "Surf's Up! Joker's Under!", he guest-starred as the character Hot Dog Harrigan.

Mitchum was a writer, poet, singer, and guitar player. An autobiography/biography about his life and career and that of his brother Robert was published in 1998, called Them Ornery Mitchum Boys. He composed the piece "America, Why I Love Her", which John Wayne included in his book and album of the same name. The piece and a short film with Wayne's narration were aired at many television stations at sign-off time before stations began broadcasting 24 hours a day in the late 1970s and early 1980s. Wayne is often mistakenly credited with composing the piece.

== Personal life and death ==
Mitchum was married four times, first to Joy Hallward, older sister of film noir femme fatale Gloria Grahame.

Mitchum died on November 29, 2001, after complications of three strokes. He was 82.

== Selected filmography ==
=== With Clint Eastwood ===
- Paint Your Wagon (1969) – Jacob Woodling
- Dirty Harry (1971) – Frank De Georgio
- High Plains Drifter (1973) – Warden
- Magnum Force (1973) – Frank De Georgio
- The Outlaw Josey Wales (1976) – Al
- The Enforcer (1976) – Frank De Georgio

=== Other appearances ===
- The Prairie (1947) – Asa Bush
- Shed No Tears (1948) – Policeman (uncredited)
- Knock on Any Door (1949) – Jury Member (uncredited)
- The Devil's Sleep (1949) – Interne
- When Willie Comes Marching Home (1950) – Schreves (scenes deleted)
- In a Lonely Place (1950) – Bar Patron (uncredited)
- Born to Be Bad (1950) – Guest (uncredited)
- Right Cross (1950) – Sixth Reporter (uncredited)
- Flying Leathernecks (1951) – Lt. Black (uncredited)
- Submarine Command (1951) – Bert (uncredited)
- The Pace That Thrills (1952) – Blackie Meyers
- One Minute to Zero (1952) – Artillery Spotter (uncredited)
- The Lusty Men (1952) – Jack Nemo (uncredited)
- Stalag 17 (1953) – Prisoner of War (uncredited)
- Lucy Gallant (1955) – One of Casey's Air Force Buddies (uncredited)
- The Rawhide Years (1955) – Card Player (uncredited)
- Perils of the Wilderness (1956) – Brent
- The Bold and the Brave (1956) – G.I. in Bar (uncredited)
- Nightmare (1956) – Onlooker at Stan's Suicide Attempt (uncredited)
- The Man Is Armed (1956) – Officer
- Man in the Vault (1956) – Andy (uncredited)
- 5 Steps to Danger (1957) – Deputy
- Operation Mad Ball (1957) – Enlisted Man (uncredited)
- Black Patch (1957) – Saloon Dealer (uncredited)
- Death in Small Doses (1957) – Truck Consignment Man (uncredited)
- Ride Out for Revenge (1957) – Sergeant (uncredited)
- The Tall Stranger (1957) – Porter (uncredited)
- Up in Smoke (1957) – Desk Sergeant
- The Restless Gun (1958) in Episode "The Coward"
- Cole Younger, Gunfighter (1958) – Rand City Bartender
- Hell's Five Hours (1958) – Roadblock Officer (uncredited)
- Quantrill's Raiders (1958) – Sergeant (uncredited)
- The Bonnie Parker Story (1958) – John – Saloon Owner / Bartender (uncredited)
- Revolt in the Big House (1958) – Guard (uncredited)
- Johnny Rocco (1958) – Police Detective at Stakeout (uncredited)
- Guns Girls and Gangsters (1959) – Armored Car Guard (uncredited)
- Al Capone (1959) – Photographer (uncredited)
- The Gunfight at Dodge City (1959) – Rowdy Drunken Cowboy (uncredited)
- Battle Flame (1959) – Maj. Dowling
- Tales of Wells Fargo (1961) TV S5:E23, "A Show from Silver Lode"
- The Sergeant Was a Lady (1961) – MP #1
- Hitler (1962) – Hermann Goering
- The Virginian (1963 episode "Echo of Another Day") as Madison
- Cattle King (1963) – Tex
- My Fair Lady (1964) – Ad Lib at Church (uncredited)
- Brainstorm (1965) – Guitar-Playing Inmate (uncredited)
- Seconds (1966) – Truck Driver (uncredited)
- The Plainsman (1966) – Townsman (uncredited)
- Warning Shot (1967) – Reporter at Apartment (uncredited)
- The Way West (1967) – Little Henry
- El Dorado (1967) – Elmer – Jason's Bartender (uncredited)
- Three Guns for Texas (1968) – George (uncredited)
- Bandolero! (1968) – Bath House Barber
- Chisum (1970) – Baker
- Bigfoot (1970) – Elmer Briggs
- One More Train to Rob (1971) – Guard (uncredited)
- Do Not Fold, Spindle, or Mutilate (1971) – Mr. Tubbs
- Chandler (1971) – Rudy, Bartender
- Bloody Trail (1972) – Hoss
- The World Through the Eyes of Children (1975) – Preacher
- Breakheart Pass (1975) – Red Beard
- Pipe Dreams (1976) – Franklin
- Telefon (1977) – Harry Bascom
- Where's Willie? (1978)
- Jake Spanner, Private Eye (1989) – J.P. Spanner
