= Mitcham (disambiguation) =

Mitcham is a town in the London Borough of Merton, London, England.

Mitcham may also refer to:

== Places ==
- Mitcham (UK Parliament constituency), comprising Mitcham, Wallington and Beddington suburbs of South London
- Mitcham tram stop, a tram stop on the Tramlink network
- Mitcham, New Zealand, a locality in the Ashburton District
- Mitcham, South Australia, a suburb of Adelaide in South Australia
- The City of Mitcham, local council area in South Australia
- Mitcham, Victoria, a suburb of Melbourne, Victoria, Australia
  - Mitcham railway station, Melbourne
- Electoral district of Mitcham (Victoria), an electoral district in Victoria, Australia
- Electoral district of Mitcham (South Australia)

== Surname ==
- Carl Mitcham (born 1941), American philosopher of technology
- Gene Mitcham (1932–2008), American football player
- Howard Mitcham (1917–1996), American artist, poet, and cook
- Judson Mitcham (born 1948), American author and poet
- Matthew Mitcham (born 1988), Australian Olympic gold medalist in diving
- Rio Mitcham (born 1999), British sprinter
- Samuel W. Mitcham (born 1949), American author and military historian
- Wilbur Mitcham (1923–2003), American chef

== See also ==
- Michtam (disambiguation)
- Mitchum (surname)
