= James Atlee Phillips =

American writer

- Born: James Atlee Phillips; 1915; Fort Worth, Texas
- Died: May 26, 1991; Corpus Christi, Texas
- Occupations: Airline executive, novelist
- Writing career
- Pen name: Philip Atlee
- Language: English
- Genre: Spy fiction
- Notable work: Creator of Joe Gall

James Atlee Phillips (1915 – May 26, 1991) was an American writer who used the pseudonym Philip Atlee for his "Contract" series of spy novels.

== Life ==
Phillips was born in Fort Worth, Texas and attended University of Texas at Austin, Texas Christian University and the University of Missouri. In World War II he worked for China National Airlines in Rangoon and later ran the national airline in Myanmar (then called Burma).

Phillips was the father of Shawn Phillips and the brother of CIA officer David Atlee Phillips.

== Works ==
Phillips's "Contract" series featured former spy Joe Gall, who comes out of retirement to take on specific jobs. The novels were "yarns featuring sadism and pornography", and in each of them Gall would fall in love with a new woman who would end up being killed by the end of the novel.

The twenty-nine novels were published from 1963 to 1976 by Gold Medal Books. The White Wolverine Contract was nominated for the 1972 Edgar Award for best paperback original.

== Bibliography ==
As James Atlee Phillips (incomplete):

- The Case of the Shivering Chorus Girls (1942)
- Suitable for Framing (1950)
- Pagoda (1951)
- The Deadly Mermaid (1954)

As Philip Atlee (all published by Gold Medal):

- The Green Wound (reprinted as The Green Wound Contract) (1963)
- The Silken Baroness (reprinted as The Silken Baroness Contract) (1966)
- The Death Bird Contract (1966)
- The Paper Pistol Contract (1966)
- The Irish Beauty Contract (1966)
- The Star Ruby Contract (1967)
- The Rockabye Contract (1968)
- The Skeleton Coast Contract (1968)
- The Ill Wind Contract (1969)
- The Trembling Earth Contract (1969)
- The Fer-de-Lance Contract (1971)
- The Canadian Bomber Contract (1971)
- The White Wolverine Contract (1971)
- The Kiwi Contract (1972)
- The Judah Lion Contract (1973)
- The Spice Route Contract (1973)
- The Shankill Road Contract (1973)
- The Underground Cities Contract (1974)
- The Kowloon Contract (1974)
- The Black Venus Contract (1975)
- The Makassar Strait Contract (1976)
- The Last Domino Contract (1976)
