= Julie Mitchum =

American actress (1914–2003)

- Born: Annette Mitchum; July 23, 1914; Charleston, South Carolina, U.S.
- Died: February 21, 2003 (aged 88); Sun City, Arizona, U.S.
- Occupation: Actress
- Years active: 1947-1959
- Relatives: Robert Mitchum (brother); John Mitchum (brother)

Julie Mitchum (born Annette Mitchum, July 23, 1914 – February 21, 2003) was an American actress.

== Biography ==
Perhaps Mitchum's most notable role was her final film appearance as that of Ruth Bridgers in the 1959 William Castle "campy supernatural horror" film House on Haunted Hill, in which she co-starred with Vincent Price. She also had an uncredited bit part as a slave in The Ten Commandments as well as The High and the Mighty with John Wayne.

Mitchum was also a musician, singing and playing piano in night clubs. During World War II, she entertained military personnel overseas. In the early 1950s, she had her own program on KLAC-TV in Los Angeles.

== Filmography ==
Year	Title	Role	Notes
1947	Sarge Goes to College	Nurse Attendant	Uncredited
1947	Killer Dill	Miss Croft - Jones' Secretary	Uncredited
1954	The High and the Mighty	Susie Wilby	
1956	Edge of Hell	Miss Halsey	
1956	The Ten Commandments	Slave	Uncredited
1957	Hit and Run	Undertaker's Wife	
1959	House on Haunted Hill	Ruth Bridgers	(final film role)
