= Robert Mitchum =

American actor (1917–1997)

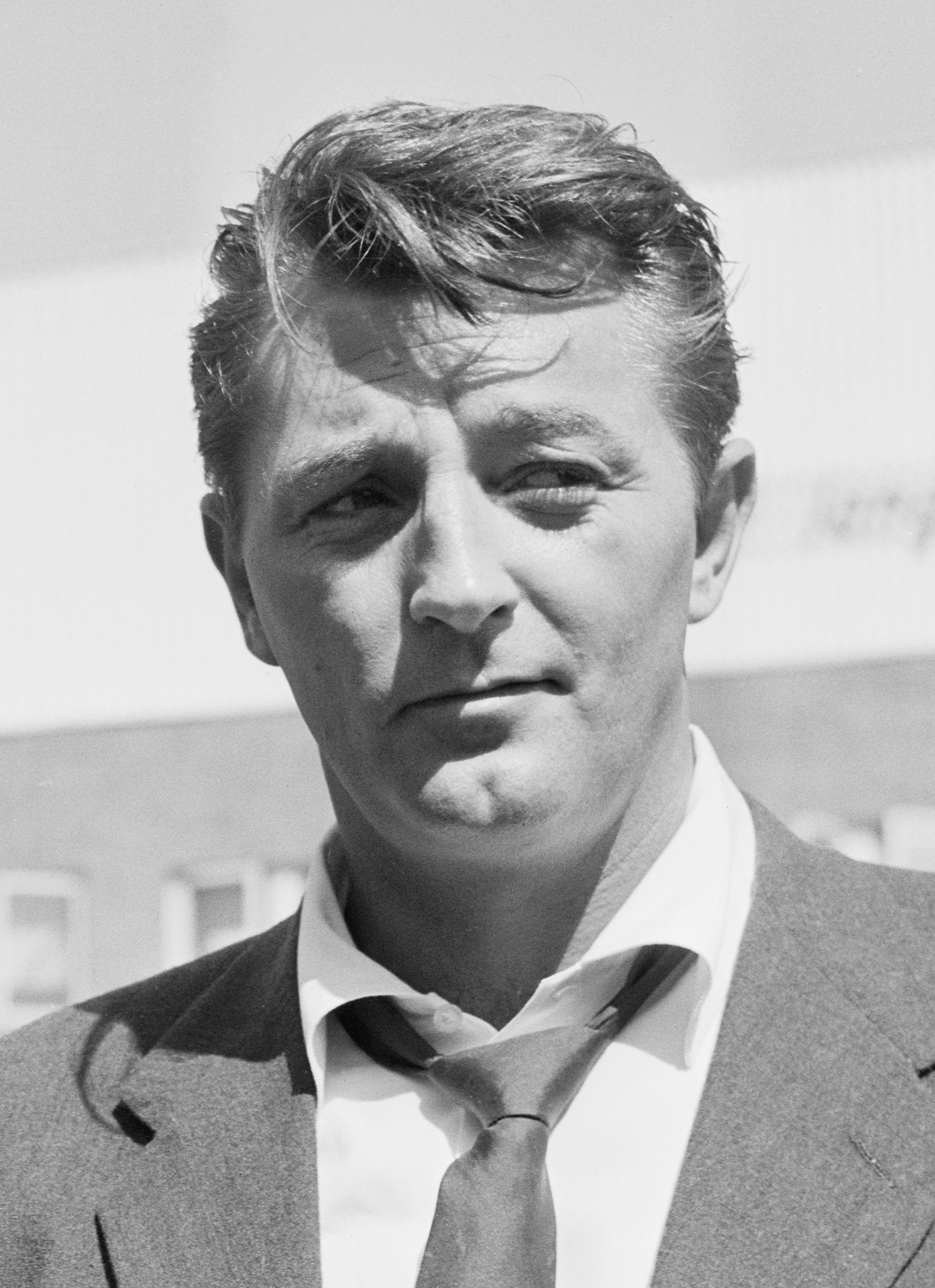
- Mitchum in 1955
- Born: Robert Charles Durman Mitchum; August 6, 1917; Bridgeport, Connecticut, U.S.
- Died: July 1, 1997 (aged 79); Santa Barbara, California, U.S.
- Resting place: Cremated; Ashes scattered in the Pacific Ocean
- Occupations: Actor; singer
- Years active: 1937–1995
- Spouse: Dorothy Spence (m. 1940)
- Children: 3, including James and Christopher Mitchum
- Relatives: Julie Mitchum (sister); John Mitchum (brother); Bentley Mitchum (grandson); Casper Van Dien (grandson-in-law); Grace Van Dien (great-granddaughter)

Robert Charles Durman Mitchum (August 6, 1917 – July 1, 1997) was an American actor and singer. He is known for his antihero roles and film noir appearances. He received nominations for an Academy Award and a BAFTA Award. He received a star on the Hollywood Walk of Fame in 1984 and the Golden Globe Cecil B. DeMille Award in 1992. Mitchum is rated number 23 on the American Film Institute's list of the greatest male stars of classic American cinema.

Mitchum rose to prominence with an Academy Award nomination for the Best Supporting Actor for The Story of G.I. Joe (1945). His best-known films include Out of the Past (1947), Angel Face (1953), River of No Return (1954), The Night of the Hunter (1955), Heaven Knows, Mr. Allison (1957), The Enemy Below (1957), Thunder Road (1958), The Sundowners (1960), Cape Fear (1962), El Dorado (1966), Ryan's Daughter (1970), The Friends of Eddie Coyle (1973), and Farewell, My Lovely (1975). He is also known for his television role as U.S. Navy Captain Victor "Pug" Henry in the epic miniseries The Winds of War (1983) and its sequel War and Remembrance (1988–1989).

Film critic Roger Ebert called Mitchum his favorite movie star and the soul of film noir: "With his deep, laconic voice and his long face and those famous weary eyes, he was the kind of guy you'd picture in a saloon at closing time, waiting for someone to walk in through the door and break his heart." David Thomson wrote: "Since the war, no American actor has made more first-class films, in so many different moods."

== Early life ==
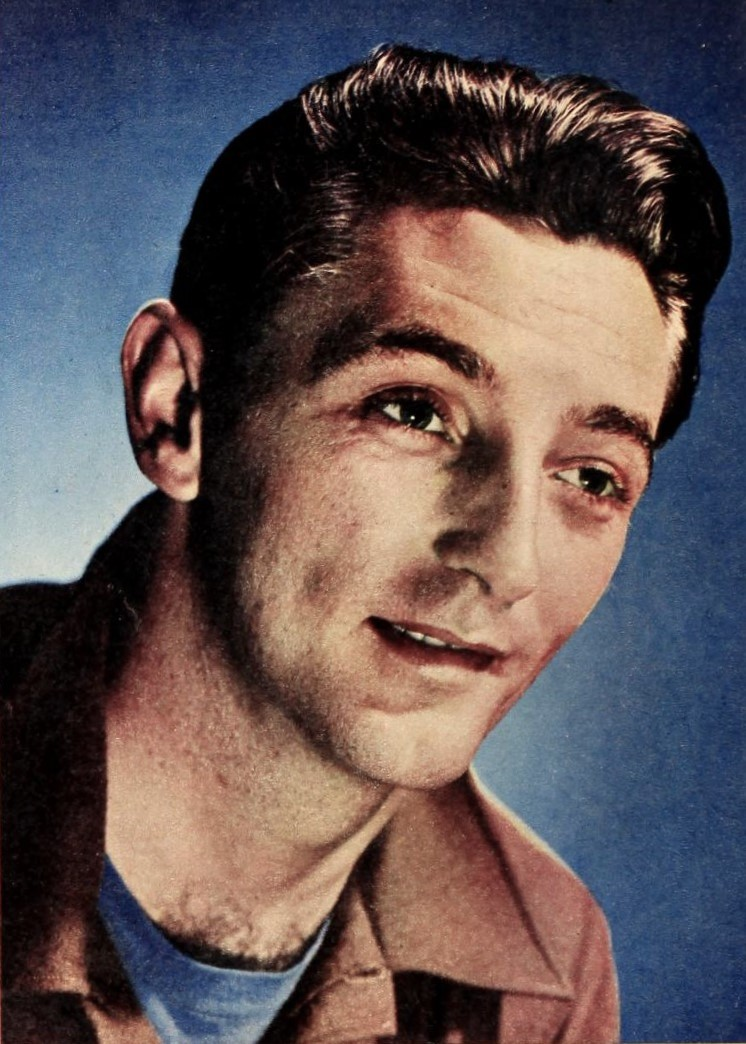
Mitchum in 1946

Robert Charles Durman Mitchum was born in Bridgeport, Connecticut, on August 6, 1917, into a Methodist family of Scots-Irish, Native American, and Norwegian descent. His father, James Thomas Mitchum, a shipyard and railroad worker, was of Scots-Irish and Native American descent, (Note: According to Mitchum, his Native American ancestors came from South Carolina and both his paternal grandparents were half-Blackfoot Indian.) and his mother, Ann Harriet Gunderson, was a Norwegian immigrant and sea captain's daughter. His older sister, Annette (known as Julie Mitchum during her acting career), was born in 1914. James was crushed to death in a railyard accident in Charleston, South Carolina, in February 1919. Ann was pregnant at the time, and was awarded a government pension. She returned to Connecticut after staying for some time in her husband's hometown of Lane, South Carolina. Her third child, John, was born in September 1919. (Note: John later also became an actor.)

When all of the children were old enough to attend school, Ann found employment as a linotype operator for the Bridgeport Post. She married Lieutenant Hugh "The Major" Cunningham Morris, a former Royal Naval Reserve officer. They had a daughter, Carol Morris, born c. 1928 on the family farm in Delaware.

As a child, Mitchum was known as a prankster, often involved in fistfights and mischief. In 1926, his mother sent him and his younger brother to live with her parents on a farm near Woodside, Delaware. He attended Felton High School, where he was expelled for mischief. During his years at the Felton school, he ran away from home for the first time at age 11.

In 1929, Mitchum and his younger brother were sent to Philadelphia to live with their older sister, Julie, who had started her career as a performer in vaudeville acts on the East Coast. The following year, he and the rest of the family moved to New York City with Julie, sharing an apartment in Manhattan's Hell's Kitchen with her and her husband. Mitchum attended Haaren High School but was eventually expelled.

Mitchum left home at age 14 and traveled throughout the country, hopping freight cars and taking a number of jobs, including ditch digging, fruit picking, and dishwashing. In the summer of 1933, he was arrested for vagrancy in Savannah, Georgia and put in a local chain gang. (Note: Mitchum talked about his chain gang experience in the 1962 Saturday Evening Post interview: "I had hopped a freight train with about seventeen other kids and headed South. In my pocket I had thirty-eight dollars – all I had in the world. When we reached Savannah, I was cold and hungry. So I dropped off to get something to eat. The big fuzz grabbed me. 'For what?' I asked. He grinned. 'Vagrancy – we don't like Yankee bums around here.' When I told him I had thirty-eight dollars, he just called me a so-and-so wise guy and belted me with his club and ran me in.") By Mitchum's account, he escaped and hitchhiked to Rising Sun, Delaware, where his family had moved. That fall, at age 16, while recovering from injuries that nearly cost him a leg, he met 14-year-old Dorothy Spence, whom he would later marry.

Mitchum worked for the Civilian Conservation Corps for a few months, digging ditches and planting trees, before going back on the road in July 1934. He headed for Long Beach, California, where his older sister had moved with her husband. The rest of the family soon also arrived and moved in with Julie. For the next three years, Mitchum continued traveling across the country and taking various jobs. He participated in 27 professional boxing matches but retired from the ring after a fight that broke his nose and left a scar on his left eye. (Note: Later, when asked by a casting office if he had considered having his nose surgically fixed, Mitchum replied, "It's already been fixed, by about four left hooks.")

== Acting career ==
=== Getting established ===
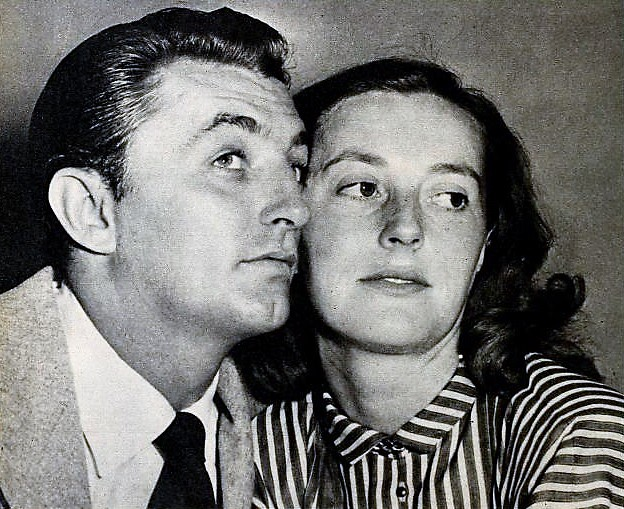
Robert and Dorothy Mitchum (1948)

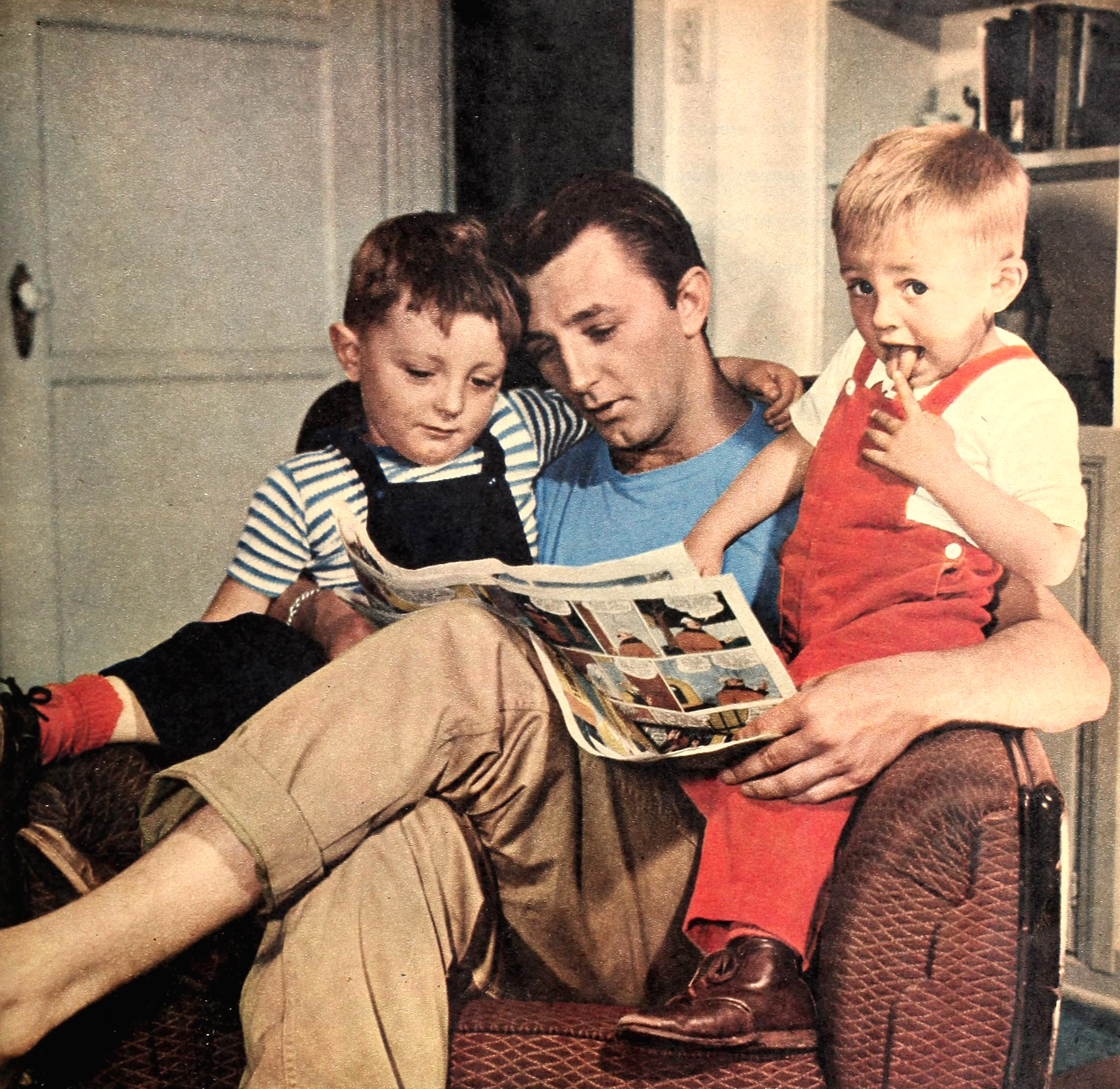
Mitchum with his sons (1946)

By 1937, Mitchum had settled in Long Beach, California. His older sister, Julie, tried to return to show business and became a member of the Players Guild, a local theater group. Often accompanying her home after her rehearsals, he took an interest in the group's productions and became acquainted with her colleagues. With his mother's encouragement, Mitchum joined the Players Guild and made his stage debut in August 1937. He continued appearing in their productions and also wrote two children's plays. After Julie began working as a cabaret singer, he started writing lyrics for her and other performers. In 1939, he wrote and composed an oratorio that was produced and directed by Orson Welles and performed at a benefit for Jewish refugees.

In late 1939, Mitchum was hired by astrologer Carroll Righter as an assistant for an Eastern Seaboard tour. (Note: Some sources report that Mitchum once worked as a ghostwriter for Righter. However, in a 1991 interview, Mitchum denied such rumors, saying that he had never done any writing for Righter.) He returned to Delaware to marry Dorothy Spence in 1940 during this trip and then moved back to California with her. He quit his work as a writer for cabaret acts after a promised payment failed to materialize. Intending to provide a steady income for his family after his wife became pregnant, Mitchum took a job as a sheet metal worker at the Lockheed Aircraft Corporation during World War II. He acted part-time for a while, and his last stage appearance before his entrance into films was in 1941. (Note: Mitchum's first child was born on the opening night of a local theater production he appeared in.) The noise of the machinery at Lockheed damaged his hearing. Assigned to a graveyard shift, he suffered from chronic insomnia and went temporarily blind. Told by his doctors that his illness was caused by job-related anxieties, he left Lockheed.

Mitchum then sought work as a film actor. An agent he knew from his work in theater got him an interview with Harry Sherman, the producer of United Artists' Hopalong Cassidy Western film series, which starred William Boyd. In June 1942, Mitchum began his film career with a part as a minor villain in Border Patrol, the first of seven Hopalong Cassidy films he made that were released in 1943. That year, he appeared in a total of 19 films. His first non-Western was Follow the Band, a musical at Universal, and he went uncredited as a soldier in The Human Comedy, a major MGM picture starring Mickey Rooney. Other films in which he played supporting parts included a Laurel and Hardy comedy, The Dancing Masters, and two war films starring Randolph Scott, Corvette K-225 and Gung Ho!. Harry Cohn offered him a studio contract after viewing his performance in Columbia's musical Doughboys in Ireland. Mitchum, however, declined the offer.

Mitchum's first important role was in When Strangers Marry, a thriller directed by William Castle and released by Monogram in 1944. Opposite Dean Jagger and Kim Hunter, he played a salesman who helps his former girlfriend solve a murder mystery. Mitchum received positive reviews for his performance, and in retrospect, the film is considered a fine example of a B movie. That same year, he was cast in a small role in the war film Thirty Seconds Over Tokyo, starring Van Johnson and Robert Walker and featuring Spencer Tracy in a guest performance. Director Mervyn LeRoy was impressed by Mitchum's talent and recommended him to RKO.

On May 25, 1944, Mitchum signed a seven-year contract with RKO at an initial salary of $350 per week, effective June 1. David O. Selznick's Vanguard Films bought a piece of the contract. Mitchum's first film for RKO was Girl Rush (1944), a comedy starring Brown and Carney. He was groomed for B-Western stardom in two Zane Grey adaptations, Nevada (1944) and West of the Pecos (1945), with the former marking his first time receiving star billing. Both films did well at the box office and received positive reviews from critics.

Following the filming of the two Westerns, RKO lent Mitchum to independent producer Lester Cowan for a prominent supporting actor role in The Story of G.I. Joe (1945), directed by William A. Wellman. He portrayed a war-weary officer based on Captain Henry T. Waskow, who remains resolute despite the troubles he faces. The film, which followed the life of an ordinary soldier through the eyes of journalist Ernie Pyle, played by Burgess Meredith, became an instant critical and commercial success. General Dwight D. Eisenhower called it the greatest war picture he had ever seen. Before its release, Mitchum was drafted into the United States Army, serving at Fort MacArthur, California, as a medic. The Story of G.I. Joe was nominated for four Academy Awards, including Mitchum's only nomination for an Academy Award, for Best Supporting Actor. The film established Mitchum as a star, and nearly three decades later, Andrew Sarris described his performance as "extraordinarily haunting" in The Village Voice.

In 1946, Mitchum appeared in Till the End of Time, Edward Dmytryk's box office hit about returning Marine veterans, with Dorothy McGuire and Guy Madison, before migrating to a genre that came to define his career and screen persona: film noir.

=== Film noir ===
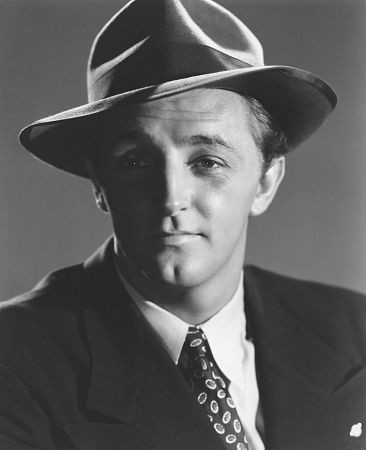
Mitchum in his film noir days

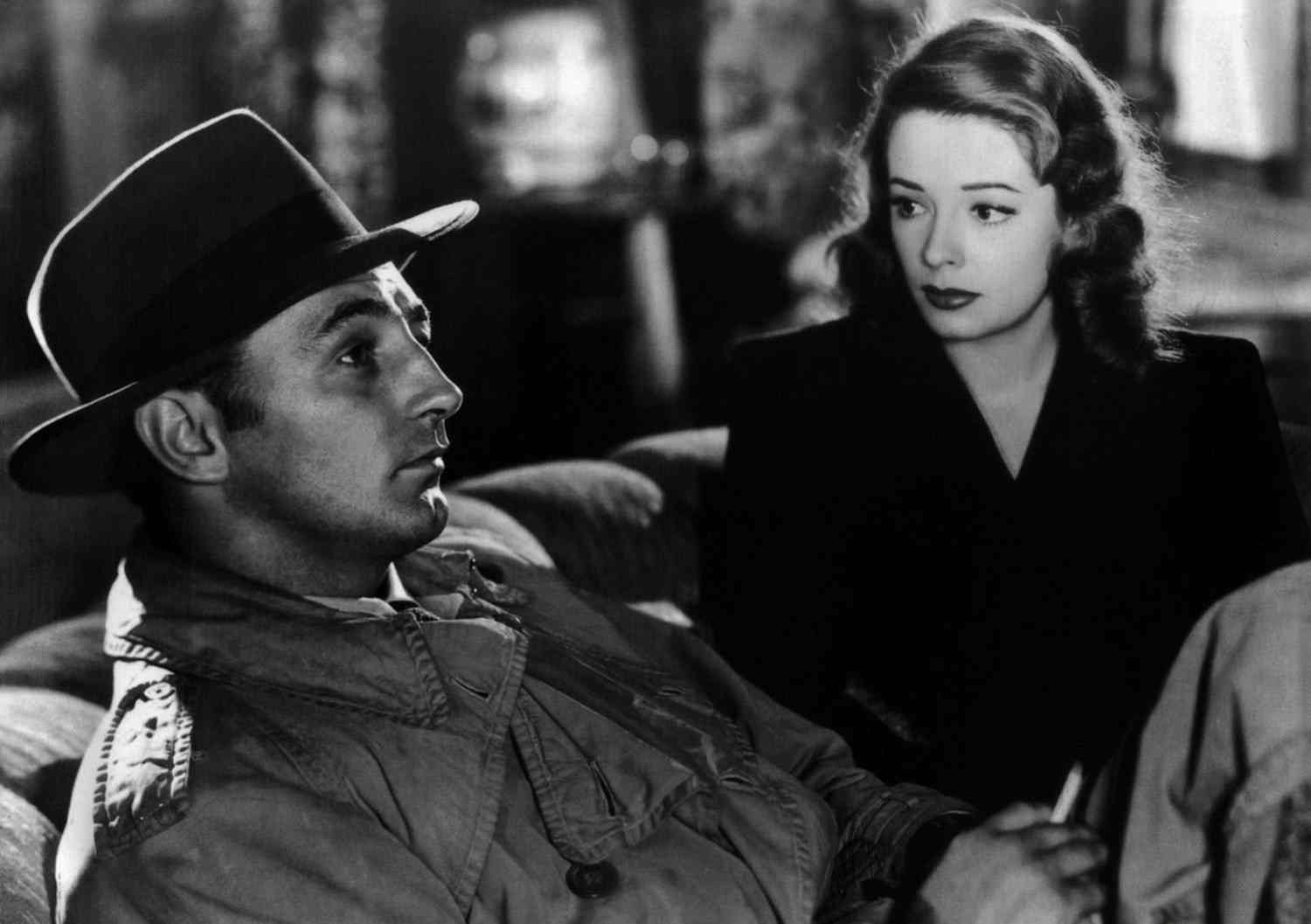
With Jane Greer in Out of the Past (1947)

Mitchum ultimately became best known for his work in film noir. He was cast as the second lead in two noirs in 1946. On a loan-out to MGM, he costarred with Katharine Hepburn and Robert Taylor in Vincente Minnelli's Undercurrent, playing a troubled, sensitive man entangled in the affairs of his tycoon brother and his brother's suspicious wife. At RKO, he appeared in John Brahm's The Locket, playing a bitter ex-boyfriend to Laraine Day's femme fatale. The latter, noted for its use of multi-layered flashbacks, has become a cult classic.

Mitchum's career took a significant turn in 1947. He was loaned to Warner Bros. for Raoul Walsh's Pursued, costarring Teresa Wright, playing a character who attempts to recall his past and find those responsible for killing his family. It was his first high-budget Western and is generally considered the first noir Western in American cinema. Edward Dmytryk's Crossfire, costarring Robert Young and Robert Ryan, featured Mitchum as a member of a group of returned World War II soldiers embroiled in a murder investigation for an act committed by an anti-semite in their ranks. With a modest budget, the picture became RKO's most profitable film of 1947 and earned five Academy Award nominations. Desire Me, a loan-out to MGM, costarring Greer Garson, was Mitchum's least successful film of the year. A troubled production and box office disaster, it is often cited as the first major Hollywood film released without a credited director.

Following the success of Pursued and Crossfire, Mitchum was signed to a new seven-year contract with RKO and David O. Selznick, which immediately increased his salary from $1,500 to $3,000 per week. He rounded out 1947 with Out of the Past (also known as Build My Gallows High), landing his first starring role in a major RKO production. Directed by Jacques Tourneur, costarring Jane Greer and Kirk Douglas, and featuring the cinematography of Nicholas Musuraca, the picture cast Mitchum as a small-town gas-station owner and former private investigator whose unfinished business with a gambler and a femme fatale comes back to haunt him. RKO leaders, who were initially unimpressed with the finished film, were surprised to see it become a moderate success at the box office. Mitchum received generally favorable reviews for his performance, with The New York Times' Bosley Crowther finding him "magnificently cheeky and self-assured." The film's reception solidified his status as a leading man at his home studio. Today, Out of the Past is widely regarded as one of the greatest of all film noirs, featuring Mitchum in his signature role as the genre's fatalistic anti-hero.

On September 1, 1948, during the rise of his career, Mitchum was arrested for possession of marijuana with actress Lila Leeds. While RKO could have cited the morals clause and canceled his contract, the studio chose to stand by him. He served for 50 days, split between the Los Angeles County Jail and a Castaic, California, prison farm, and was released on March 30, 1949. Life photographers were permitted to take photos of him mopping up in his prison uniform. He later told reporters that jail was "like Palm Springs, but without the riff-raff." (Note: The arrest inspired the exploitation film She Shoulda Said No! (1949), which starred Leeds.) Mitchum's conviction was later overturned by the Los Angeles court and district attorney's office on January 31, 1951, after being exposed as a setup.

Despite Mitchum's legal troubles, his popularity was not harmed. His upcoming film, Rachel and the Stranger, was rushed into release to take advantage of the publicity surrounding the arrest and became one of RKO's top grossers of 1948. Costarring with Loretta Young and William Holden, he played a mountain man competing for the hand of the indentured servant and wife of a recent widower. That same year, he appeared in Robert Wise's noir Western Blood on the Moon with Barbara Bel Geddes, playing a cowboy caught in a conflict between cattle owners and homesteaders. His performance received rave reviews, with critics noting his screen image as a quiet yet menacing drifter and pointing out that his presence enhanced the film's quality.

Mitchum starred in three films in 1949. The Red Pony, the film adaptation of John Steinbeck's novella, directed by Lewis Milestone and costarring Myrna Loy, was his first color film. A loan-out to Republic Pictures, it featured him as a trusted cowhand to a ranching family. Back at RKO in The Big Steal, an early Don Siegel film, he returned to film noir in a reunion with Jane Greer, playing an army lieutenant who chases a thief with the help of the thief's fiancée. It was a box office success. He was cast against type in the romantic comedy Holiday Affair opposite Janet Leigh. Although the film failed at the box office at the time, it is now identified as a Christmas classic with annual showings on television.

By the end of the 1940s, Mitchum had become RKO's biggest star. Before the filming of Holiday Affair, RKO studio head Howard Hughes bought Selznick's share of his contract for $400,000.

=== Mainstream stardom in the 1950s and 1960s ===
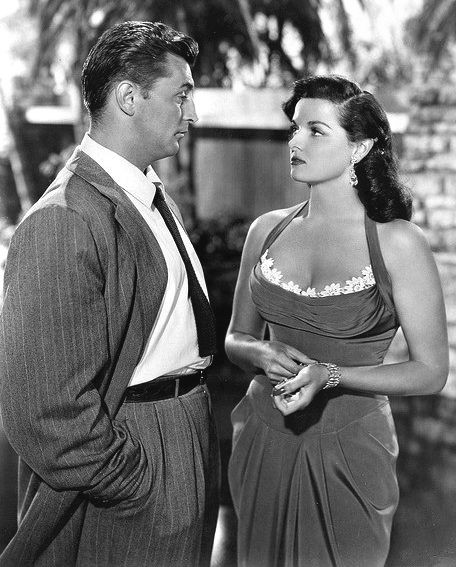
Mitchum with Jane Russell in His Kind of Woman (1951)

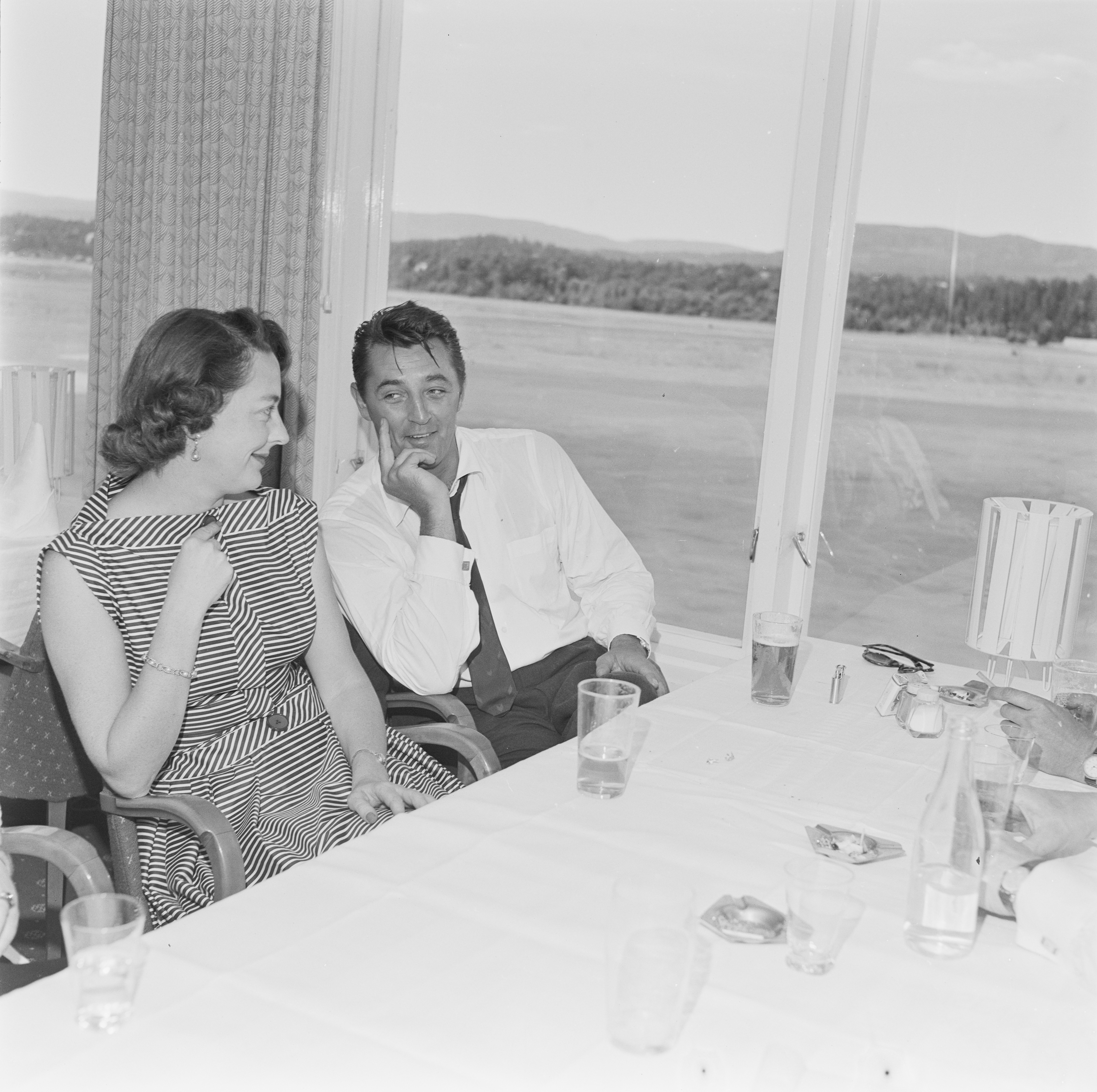
Mitchum with his wife Dorothy (1955)

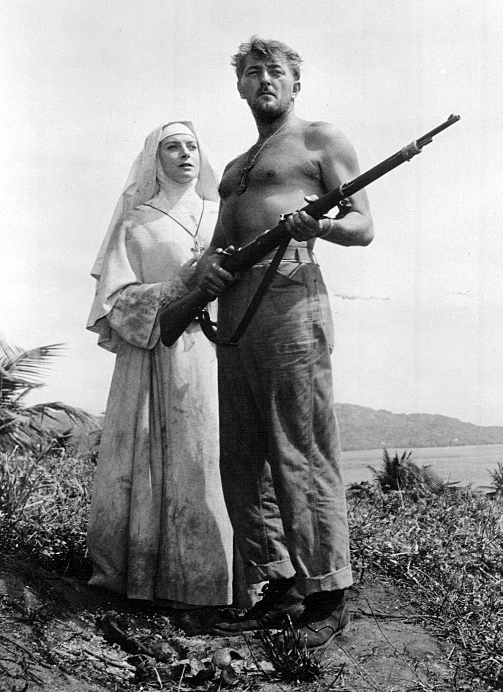
Mitchum with Deborah Kerr in Heaven Knows, Mr. Allison (1957)

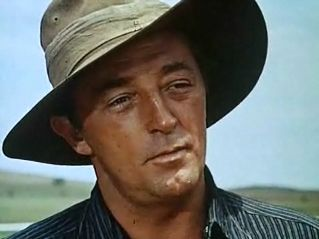
Mitchum in The Sundowners (1960)

Mitchum as Max Cady in Cape Fear (1962)

Mitchum appeared in a string of film noirs in the early 1950s. In Where Danger Lives (1950), he played a doctor who comes between a mentally unbalanced Faith Domergue and a cuckolded Claude Rains. The film received mixed reviews from critics. He and Ava Gardner played star-crossed lovers in My Forbidden Past (1951), a box office flop. The script was so disappointing that he publicly complained about it during the making of the film. The next three films he starred in were all troubled productions. His Kind of Woman (1951) starred Mitchum as a down-on-his-luck gambler lured to a Mexican resort by mobsters and paired him for the first time with Jane Russell, RKO's top female star at the time. Richard Fleischer was brought on by Howard Hughes for extensive reshooting of John Farrow's original cut. The Racket (1951), a noir remake of the 1928 silent crime drama of the same name, featured him as a police captain fighting corruption in his precinct. Four other directors contributed to the project alongside the credited John Cromwell. Macao (1952) reunited him with Russell, casting him as a victim of mistaken identity at an exotic resort casino. Director Josef von Sternberg was forced off the set by Hughes and replaced by Nicholas Ray. While The Racket was one of RKO's most successful films of 1951, both His Kind of Woman and Macao cost so much that they lost money.

Following the Korean War drama One Minute to Zero (1952) with Ann Blyth, which was one of RKO's biggest pictures of the year, Mitchum returned to the Western genre. He starred as a veteran rodeo champion in The Lusty Men (also 1952), directed by Nicholas Ray and costarring Susan Hayward and Arthur Kennedy. His performance was lauded by critics, with Variety and The Hollywood Reporter calling it his best to date. Manny Farber wrote in The Nation, "Mitchum is the most convincing cowboy I've seen in horse opry, meeting every situation with the lonely, distant calm of a master cliché-dodger."

In 1953, Mitchum starred in Otto Preminger's Angel Face, (Note: According to the AFI Catalog, Angel Face had previews in 1952 and was released in 1953.) the first of his three films with Jean Simmons. He played an ambulance driver who allows a murderously insane heiress to fatally seduce him. The initial reviews were mixed, but the film is now recognized as a noir classic. Jean-Luc Godard named it as one of the best ten American sound pictures. In a retrospective review in 2010, Richard Brody wrote in The New Yorker that "the ever-cool Mitchum radiates heat without warmth."

In exchange for Hayward's appearance in The Lusty Men, Mitchum was loaned to 20th Century Fox for White Witch Doctor (1953) opposite Hayward, playing a hunter who falls in love with a nurse in Africa. Although director Henry Hathaway was impressed by Mitchum's performance, the critics were not. Back at RKO, Mitchum appeared in the studio's first 3-D production, Second Chance (also 1953), playing a boxer whose girlfriend is trailed by a mobster in Mexico. The film, directed by Rudolph Maté and costarring Linda Darnell and Jack Palance, was a box office success and received fairly positive reviews. However, Mitchum had not liked the script and was increasingly dissatisfied with the projects assigned to him by RKO.

In 1954, Mitchum reteamed with Simmons in the romantic comedy She Couldn't Say No, his last film released by RKO. (Note: The film was not the last film Mitchum made for RKO, but the last that was released. It had been completed in 1952, right before Angel Face, but Hughes shelved it for a long time before releasing it in the United Kingdom in 1953 and in the United States in 1954.) It was often considered the studio's failed attempt to revive the screwball genre. That same year, he was loaned out for two films. At 20th Century Fox, he costarred with Marilyn Monroe in Preminger's Western River of No Return, which was a box office hit. In William A. Wellman's psychological drama Track of the Cat for Wayne/Fellows Productions, John Wayne's independent production company, he played the bullying brother of Teresa Wright and Tab Hunter. Mitchum recalled the film, which was shot in the deep snow at Mount Rainier, as his toughest location shooting experience. The film was not a success on release, Wellman later describing it in his autobiography as "a flop artistically, financially, and Wellmanly." However, it is now recognized as a unique masterpiece by some critics, noted for its color-drained visual style, the story that evokes Eugene O'Neill and Carl Theodor Dreyer, and Mitchum's menacing performance.

Mitchum left RKO after his contract expired on August 15, 1954.

As a freelancer, Mitchum appeared in three films in 1955. The first was Stanley Kramer's melodrama Not as a Stranger costarring Olivia de Havilland and Frank Sinatra, in which he starred as an idealistic young doctor who marries an older nurse only to question his morality many years later. The picture was one of the ten highest-grossing films of the year, but critical reactions were mixed, with Leslie Halliwell pointing out that all of the actors were too old for their characters.

Mitchum's second film in 1955 was The Night of the Hunter, Charles Laughton's only film as a director. Based on a novel by Davis Grubb, the noir thriller starred Mitchum as a serial killer posing as a preacher to find money hidden by his cellmate in the man's home. A commercial failure on release, the film is now widely regarded as one of the greatest films of all time. Mitchum's performance as Preacher Harry Powell is considered by many one of the best of his career, and the image of him with the words "HATE" and "LOVE" tattooed on his knuckles has left an enduring impact on popular culture, frequently referenced in various media. In a 1985 review for the Chicago Reader, Dave Kehr described the Preacher as "the role that most fully exploits his [Mitchum's] ferocious sexuality." Roger Ebert wrote in the Chicago Sun-Times in 1996, "Nobody who has seen The Night of the Hunter has forgotten it, or Mitchum's voice coiling down those basement stairs: 'Chillll ... dren?'"

Before accepting the lead in the Western Man with the Gun, his final release of 1955, Mitchum made headlines for having been fired from Blood Alley (1955) at the request of director William A. Wellman. Reportedly, he had thrown the film's transportation manager into San Francisco Bay, a story he denied. (Note: Crew members Andrew V. McLaglen and Sam O'Steen had provided various versions of the incident. McLaglen recalled that while Mitchum did have a conflict with the transportation manager, the press story that he threw him into the water was not true. Mitchum then made insulting remarks towards Wellman, and Robert Fellows, Wayne's production partner, "picked up on an opportunity" to cast Wayne instead. O'Steen said that Mitchum showed up on-set after a night of drinking and tore apart a studio office when they did not have a car ready for him. He walked off the set on the third day of filming, claiming that he could not work with Wellman.) Producer John Wayne eventually took the role himself.

On March 8, 1955, Mitchum formed DRM Productions, named after his and his wife's initials, and signed a five-film deal with United Artists; four ultimately were produced. The first was Bandido, in which he played an American adventurer who sides with the rebels and is attracted to the wife of a gunrunner working for the army during the Mexican Revolution. A commercial success, it was his second film released in 1956, following the poorly received color noir Foreign Intrigue.

Mitchum made two films back to back in Trinidad and Tobago that were released in 1957. John Huston's World War II drama Heaven Knows, Mr. Allison cast him as a Marine corporal stranded on a Pacific Island with a nun, played by Deborah Kerr, as his sole companion, until Japanese soldiers arrive and establish a base. In this character study, they struggle with the elements, the garrison, and their growing feelings for one another. It was the first of his four films with Kerr, his favorite leading lady. Their performances and chemistry were praised by critics, many of whom highlighted the tenderness he brought to his character. The film was nominated for two Academy Awards, Best Actress and Best Adapted Screenplay. For his role, Mitchum was nominated for a BAFTA Award for Best Foreign Actor. In Robert Parrish's Fire Down Below, he and Jack Lemmon played two tramp boat owners in the Caribbean whose friendship is challenged when passenger Rita Hayworth arrives on the scene. The film received mixed reviews and failed at the box office.

Mitchum appeared in one more film in 1957, Dick Powell's World War II submarine film The Enemy Below, in which he played the captain of a US Navy destroyer who matches wits with a wily German U-boat skipper, portrayed by Curt Jurgens. The following year, he starred in his second DRM production, Thunder Road. The film was loosely based on an incident in which a driver transporting moonshine was said to have fatally crashed on Kingston Pike in Knoxville, Tennessee, somewhere between Bearden Hill and Morrell Road. According to Metro Pulse writer Jack Renfro, the incident occurred in 1952 and may have been witnessed by James Agee, who passed the story on to Mitchum. He produced, co-wrote the screenplay for, and is rumored to have directed much of the film, which featured his son James playing his younger brother. (Note: According to Mitchum and his son James, Elvis Presley was to have played the lead, but his manager, Colonel Tom Parker, wanted him to focus on musicals, and Mitchum went on to star himself. However, some other sources say it was the part of Mitchum's character's brother that Presley was considered for. Presley's friend George Klein recalled that Mitchum, who wrote the film's story, thought he and Presley could do the film together, and Presley was very excited about it. (Klein did not specify which role was intended for Presley.)) He also co-wrote the theme song, "The Ballad of Thunder Road," with Don Raye. The film was frequently shown in drive-in and third-house theaters in the 1960s and has since earned the reputation as the definitive road movie, with a particularly significant following in the South. According to Geoff Andrew in his review for Time Out, Thunder Road stands out for "a stunningly laconic performance from Mitchum, white-hot night-time road scenes, and an affectionate but unsentimental vision of backwoods America."

Mitchum followed Thunder Road with his second film directed by Dick Powell, The Hunters (1958), in which he played a flying ace who is smitten with the wife of a pilot under his command during the Korean War. He was initially offered the role of Colonel Dean Hess in another Korean War drama, Battle Hymn (1957), but the casting choice was vetoed by Hess himself, who cited Mitchum's marijuana scandal. In 1959, Mitchum appeared in Robert Aldrich's thriller The Angry Hills as an American war correspondent entrusted with a list of Greek resistance leaders during World War II, before starring in his third DRM production, The Wonderful Country. Opposite Julie London, he portrayed an American expatriate gunslinger in Mexico who returns to the States for an arms deal and falls for the wife of an army major. Largely ignored by audiences and critics at the time, the film is now more highly regarded. Mitchum's performance is considered by some critics one of his best and most overlooked.

Mitchum starred in four films in 1960. In Vincente Minnelli's melodrama Home from the Hill, opposite Eleanor Parker, he played the intimidating, philandering patriarch of a powerful Texan family. The film opened to positive reviews, and modern critics have cited it as one of Minnelli's masterpieces and highly praised Mitchum's performance. He and Kerr were reunited for Fred Zinnemann's The Sundowners, playing an Australian husband and wife struggling in the sheep industry during the Depression. (Note: Although entitled to top billing, Mitchum ceded it to Kerr at her request. He stated that he had accepted the role only because Kerr would be his costar.) The film was hailed for its freshness and warmth and received five Academy Awards nominations. Mitchum's performance was universally acclaimed, with Variety commenting that he "projects a great deal of feeling with what appears to be a minimum of effort." The Night Fighters (also known as A Terrible Beauty), his last DRM production, cast him as an IRA member who becomes disillusioned with the organization during World War II. He was teamed with former leading ladies Kerr and Simmons, as well as Cary Grant, for Stanley Donen's romantic comedy The Grass Is Greener, playing an American millionaire who seduces a British countess. While The Night Fighters and The Grass Is Greener were commercial and critical failures, Mitchum earned the year's National Board of Review award for Best Actor for his performances in Home from the Hill and The Sundowners.

After moving to a farm in Talbot County, Maryland, with his family in 1959, Mitchum developed a new passion for quarter horse breeding and, for the next several years, gradually became indifferent to selecting his films, also losing interest in his work as a producer. He renamed DRM Productions as Talbot Productions after his new home county. He stated that it had since become only a "co-production" company and that he had never really produced any of his own films again.

Mitchum turned down John Huston's Western The Misfits (1961), claiming that he did not like the script and had found Huston too demanding during their last collaboration, Heaven Knows, Mr. Allison. Instead, he starred as Arch Hall Sr. in The Last Time I Saw Archie (1961), a service comedy directed by Jack Webb. While he received some positive reviews for his comedic performance, the film went unnoticed at the box office. He would often call it his favorite film, pointing out that he was paid $400,000 for just four weeks' work and had time off to go home for Christmas and New Year's.

In 1962, Mitchum costarred with Gregory Peck in Cape Fear, playing an ex-convict seeking revenge on the attorney who testified against him. His performance brought him further renown for playing cold, predatory characters. However, the film itself received mixed reviews, with some critics citing its lack of engaging storytelling; it also failed at the box office. Bosley Crowther of The New York Times stated that Mitchum delivered the "cheekiest, wickedest arrogance and the most relentless aura of sadism that he has ever managed to generate" while noting the disgust and regret provoked by the film itself. Jonathan Rosenbaum commented in 2006 that the film's "only classic credentials are a terrifying performance by Robert Mitchum and a Bernard Herrmann score." Mitchum followed Cape Fear with The Longest Day, joining the international ensemble cast of the epic war film about the D-Day landings in Normandy. He portrayed General Norman Cota, rallying demoralized troops and blasting a path from Omaha Beach. The film opened to generally positive reviews, was nominated for five Academy Awards, winning two, and went on to become the highest-grossing film in the domestic market among 1962 releases. Mitchum's performance was highlighted by critics.

Mitchum's next five films received mostly negative reviews. He was considered miscast as an indecisive lawyer in Robert Wise's romantic drama Two for the Seesaw (1962), opposite Shirley MacLaine. Two years after turning down The Misfits, he appeared in a cameo in Huston's The List of Adrian Messenger (1963), regarded as one of the director's weaker efforts. Rampage (1963), an adventure film shot in Hawaii that he made for a family vacation, starred him opposite Elsa Martinelli and Jack Hawkins as a big-game trapper vying for the affections of a hunter's girlfriend during an expedition to capture a tiger-leopard hybrid. It was viewed as either absurd or dull by critics. Guy Hamilton's courtroom drama Man in the Middle (1964) cast him as a defense attorney, with his performance perceived as lethargic. He was reunited with MacLaine as one of her all-star husbands in the comedy What a Way to Go!. It was one of the ten highest-grossing films of the year, but critics found it disjointed and overlong.

In 1965, Mitchum starred in Mister Moses, opposite Carroll Baker, as a diamond smuggler in Africa who is mistaken for a modern-day Moses and trusted by a tribe to lead them to a promised land. Mitchum, usually reluctant to participate in publicity events, undertook an extensive tour to promote the film at distributor United Artists' request, stating that he believed it was "a pretty good picture." The reviews were fairly positive, with critics noting his casual charm.

Following the release of Mister Moses, Mitchum revealed in interviews that he might leave Maryland with his family. While he enjoyed the privacy the farm provided, the challenging weather conditions and his wife's feelings of isolation eventually prompted their return to Los Angeles, a move he recalled as the right decision given his film commitments. During this time, he went on two USO tours to Vietnam.

Mitchum returned to the Western genre with two releases in 1967. While the epic The Way West with Kirk Douglas and Richard Widmark turned out to be a critical and commercial disappointment, El Dorado with John Wayne was a major success. The film, considered a quasi-remake of director Howard Hawks's Rio Bravo (1959), cast Mitchum as a drunken sheriff who, together with his gunslinger friend, helps a rancher fight a corrupt land baron. At the time of filming, rumors about Mitchum's professional attitude, Wayne's health, and Hawks's age raised doubts about the film's prospects. However, it became a box office hit domestically and internationally. The Hollywood Reporter called it Hawks's best film since Rio Bravo. The New York Times' Howard Thompson described Mitchum's performance as "simply wonderful," and the Los Angeles Times' Kevin Thomas wrote, "Mitchum delivered one of the loveliest hangover sequences on record."

Over the next two years, Mitchum appeared in six films that received mixed to poor reviews. The Western Villa Rides (1968) cast him alongside Yul Brynner's Pancho Villa as a soldier of fortune, a portrayal that critics felt suffered from a weak script. Edward Dmytryk's World War II epic Anzio (1968) starred him as a cynical war correspondent, with the directing and acting considered uninspired by many. He turned down The Wild Bunch (1969), stating that he did not want to work with director Sam Peckinpah. Instead, he costarred with Dean Martin in Henry Hathaway's 5 Card Stud (1968), again playing a homicidal preacher. The reviews of his performance were generally favorable, but the film was deemed formulaic. Joseph Losey's Secret Ceremony (1968), starring Elizabeth Taylor and Mia Farrow and featuring him in a guest appearance as an incestuous stepfather, polarized critics. Mitchum rounded out the decade with two Westerns directed by Burt Kennedy. Young Billy Young (1969) with Angie Dickinson was coldly received, while The Good Guys and the Bad Guys (1969) with George Kennedy was praised by some for its balance of drama and comedy.

=== 1970s ===
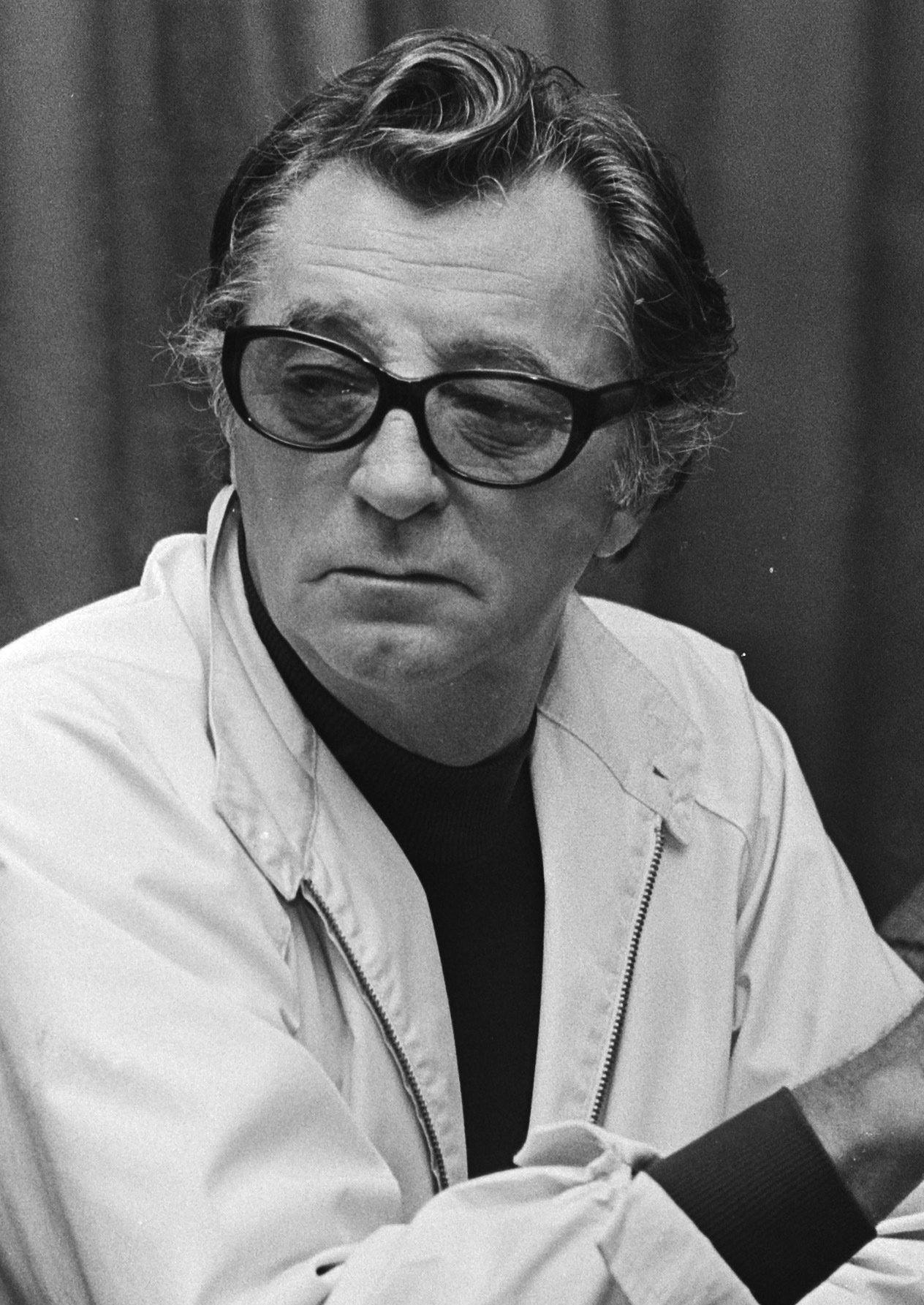
Mitchum in October 1976

Mitchum made a departure from his typical screen persona with the 1970 David Lean film Ryan's Daughter, in which he starred as Charles Shaughnessy, a mild-mannered schoolmaster in World War I–era Ireland. At the time of filming, Mitchum was considering retiring from acting and was also concerned about the film's demanding schedule. He initially turned down the script but eventually accepted the role after screenwriter Robert Bolt approached him again. (Note: When Bolt called again, Mitchum said that he could not take the film because he planned to commit suicide. Bolt told him that he could do so after the film was finished and that he would personally pay for his burial. Mitchum later recalled the phone call, "I'd just finished a film and I needed time to sit around and lick my wounds. ... When I asked him [Bolt] why he didn't get someone else, he said they'd been through all the actors and still wanted me.") Though the film was nominated for four Academy Awards (winning two) and Mitchum was much publicized as a contender for a Best Actor nomination, he was not nominated. George C. Scott won the award for his performance in Patton, a project Mitchum had rejected. Mitchum said that Patton and Dirty Harry, another picture he turned down, were movies he would not do for any amount of money because he disagreed with the morality of the scripts.

The 1970s featured Mitchum mainly in crime dramas, to mixed result. The Friends of Eddie Coyle (1973) had the actor playing an aging Boston hoodlum caught between the Feds and his criminal friends. Sydney Pollack's The Yakuza (1974) transplanted the typical film noir story arc to the Japanese underworld. Mitchum's stint as an aging Philip Marlowe in the Raymond Chandler adaptation Farewell, My Lovely (1975) (a remake of 1944's Murder, My Sweet) was sufficiently well received by audiences and critics for him to reprise the role in 1978's The Big Sleep, a remake of the 1946 film of the same title.

Mitchum also appeared in 1976's Midway about the crucial World War II naval battle.

=== Later work ===
In 1982, Mitchum played Coach Delaney in the film adaptation of playwright/actor Jason Miller's 1973 Pulitzer Prize-winning play That Championship Season. At the premiere, an intoxicated Mitchum assaulted a female reporter and threw a basketball that he was holding (a prop from the film) at a female photographer from Time magazine, causing a neck injury and knocking out two of her teeth. She sued him for $30 million in damages. The suit eventually "cost him his salary from the film".

Mitchum's role in That Championship Season may have indirectly contributed to another incident several months later. In a February 1983 Esquire interview, he made statements that some construed as racist, antisemitic, and sexist. When asked if the Holocaust had occurred, Mitchum responded, "so the Jews say." Following the widespread negative response, he apologized a month later, saying that his statements were "prankish" and "foreign to my principle." He claimed that the problem had begun when he recited a purportedly racist monologue from his role in That Championship Season and the reporter believed that the words were Mitchum's. He claimed that he had only reluctantly agreed to the interview and then proceeded to "string... along" the reporter with his statements.

Mitchum starred in the 1983 miniseries The Winds of War, based on a Herman Wouk book of the same title. The big-budget production aired on ABC, starring Mitchum as naval officer "Pug" Henry and Victoria Tennant as Pamela Tudsbury, and examined the events leading up to America's involvement in World War II. It was watched by 140 million people over seven days and became the most-watched miniseries up to that point. He returned to the role in the 1988 sequel miniseries War and Remembrance, which continued the story through the end of the war.

In 1984, Mitchum entered the Betty Ford Center in Palm Springs, California, for treatment of alcoholism.

He played George Hazard's father-in-law in the 1985 miniseries North and South, which also aired on ABC.

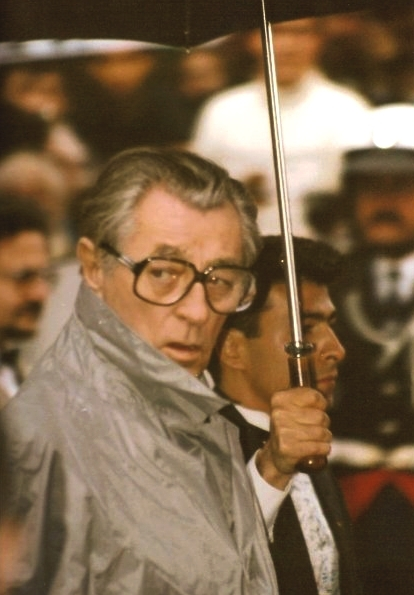
Mitchum at the 1991 Cannes Film Festival

Mitchum starred opposite Wilford Brimley in the 1986 made-for-TV movie Thompson's Run.

In 1987, Mitchum was the guest host on Saturday Night Live, where he played private eye Philip Marlowe for the last time in the parody sketch "Death Be Not Deadly." The show ran a short comedy film he made (written and directed by his daughter, Petrine) called Out of Gas, a mock sequel to Out of the Past (Jane Greer reprised her role from the original film). He also was in Richard Donner's 1988 comedy Scrooged.

In 1991, Mitchum was set to receive a lifetime achievement award from the National Board of Review of Motion Pictures. He rejected it, however, after learning that he would have to pay for his own transport and accommodations and accept it in person. (Note: Mitchum had been living in Santa Barbara, California since 1978 and the ceremony was to be held in New York. The award eventually went to Lauren Bacall instead.) That same year, he received the Telegatto award and, in 1992 the Cecil B. DeMille Award from the Golden Globe Awards.

Mitchum continued to appear in films until the mid-1990s, such as Jim Jarmusch's Dead Man, and he narrated the Western Tombstone. Though he portrayed the antagonist in the original, he played the protagonist police detective in Martin Scorsese's remake of Cape Fear, but the actor gradually slowed his workload. His last film appearance was a small but pivotal role in the television biographical film James Dean: Race with Destiny, playing Giant director George Stevens. Mitchum's last starring role was in the 1995 Norwegian movie Pakten.

== Music ==
Album cover of Mitchum's calypso record, Calypso – is like so ...

One of the lesser-known aspects of Mitchum's career was his foray into music as a singer. Critic Greg Adams writes, "Unlike most celebrity vocalists, Robert Mitchum actually had musical talent." Frank Sinatra said of Mitchum, "For anyone who's not a professional musician, he knows more about music, from Bach to Brubeck, than any man I've ever known."

Mitchum's voice was often used instead of that of a professional singer when his character sang in his films. Notable productions featuring Mitchum's own singing voice included Pursued, Rachel and the Stranger, One Minute to Zero, The Night of the Hunter, The Sundowners, and Maria's Lovers. He sang the title song to Young Billy Young and River of No Return.

Mitchum recorded two albums. After hearing traditional calypso music and meeting artists such as Mighty Sparrow and Lord Melody while filming Fire Down Below and Heaven Knows, Mr. Allison in the Caribbean islands of Tobago, he recorded Calypso – is like so .... On the album, released through Capitol Records in March 1957, he emulated the calypso sound and style, even adopting the style's unique pronunciations and slang. A year later, he recorded "The Ballad of Thunder Road", a song he had written for the film Thunder Road. The country-style song became a modest hit for Mitchum, reaching number 62 on the Billboard Pop Singles chart in September 1958. The song was included as a bonus track on a successful reissue of Calypso – is like so ....

Although Mitchum continued to use his singing voice in his film work, he waited until 1967 to record his follow-up record, That Man, Robert Mitchum, Sings. The album, released by Nashville-based Monument Records, took him further into country music and featured songs similar to "The Ballad of Thunder Road". "Little Old Wine Drinker Me", the first single, was a top-10 hit on country radio, reaching number nine there, and crossed over into mainstream radio, where it peaked at number 96. Its follow-up, "You Deserve Each Other", also charted on the Billboard Country Singles chart. Mitchum was nominated for an Academy of Country Music Award for Most Promising Male Vocalist in 1968.

=== Albums ===
Year	Album	U.S. Country	Label
1957	Calypso – is like so ...	—	Capitol
1967	That Man Robert Mitchum ... Sings	35	Monument

=== Singles ===
Year	Single	Chart positions		Album
Year	Single	U.S. Country	U.S.	Album
1958	"The Ballad of Thunder Road"	—	62	That Man Robert Mitchum ... Sings
1962	"The Ballad of Thunder Road" (re-release)	—	65	That Man Robert Mitchum ... Sings
1967	"Little Old Wine Drinker Me"	9	96	That Man Robert Mitchum ... Sings
1967	"You Deserve Each Other"	55	—	That Man Robert Mitchum ... Sings

== Personal life ==
In the fall of 1933, at the age of 16, Mitchum met his future wife, 14-year-old Dorothy Spence, at a swimming hole near Camden, Delaware. She was a schoolmate of his younger brother, John, whom she had briefly dated. (Note: John later quipped, "I made the mistake of introducing her [Dorothy] to Brother Robert.") Mitchum immediately fell for her, and the two had begun a serious relationship by the time he left for California in 1934. Meanwhile, she continued attending school in Delaware and then went to college in Philadelphia.

Mitchum married Dorothy on March 16, 1940, in the kitchen of a Methodist parson in Dover, Delaware. He brought her to Los Angeles to settle down, where he took a job at the Lockheed Aircraft Corporation before finding work as a film actor in June 1942. (Note: In the early years of their marriage, Dorothy worked as a secretary at an insurance company. She quit her job shortly before the birth of their second child in 1943.) The couple had three children: sons, James (May 8, 1941 – September 20, 2025) and Christopher (born October 16, 1943), both actors; and a daughter, Petrine (born March 3, 1952), a writer. Mitchum's grandson Bentley Mitchum and great-granddaughter Grace Van Dien are also actors.

Despite his reported affairs with other women, including author Edna O'Brien and actresses Lucille Ball, Ava Gardner, Jean Simmons, Shirley MacLaine, and Sarah Miles, Mitchum and wife Dorothy remained together until his death in 1997. He told journalist Don Short in a 1977 interview: "Not as though there has been anyone else in my life except Dorothy. There's not one of 'em—and I've met the best of 'em—worth lighting a candle for alongside her."

Mitchum's close friends included Jane Russell, his neighbor in Santa Barbara, California; and Deborah Kerr, his favorite co-star.

Although he was born into a Methodist family and later married by a Methodist parson, Mitchum was non-religious. Politically, he was a Republican who campaigned for Barry Goldwater in the 1964 United States presidential election. Mitchum supported Ronald Reagan in 1980 and George H. W. Bush in 1992, narrating a promotional film for the latter that played at the Republican National Convention.

== Death ==
A lifelong heavy smoker, Mitchum died in his sleep at 5 a.m. on July 1, 1997, at his home in Santa Barbara, California, from complications of lung cancer and emphysema. His wife of 57 years, Dorothy, was by his side.

Mitchum's body was cremated and, on July 6, his ashes were scattered into the Pacific Ocean off the coast near his home. The private ceremony was attended by only his family members and his longtime friend Jane Russell. The cenotaph was placed in his memory in his wife's family plot at the Odd Fellows Cemetery in Camden, Delaware. Mitchum's wife, Dorothy, died on April 23, 2014, at age 94. In accordance with the couple's wishes, her ashes were also scattered at sea so that they could be symbolically reunited at Easter Island.

== Reception, acting style, and legacy ==
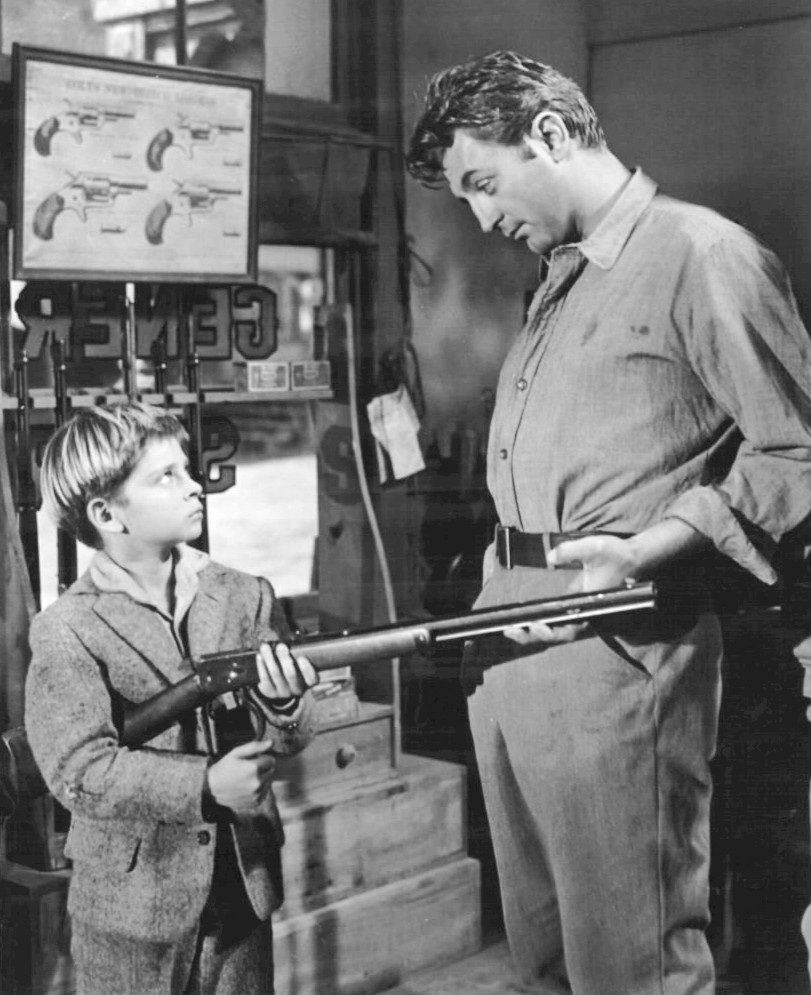
Mitchum with Tommy Rettig in a scene from River of No Return (1954)

Mitchum is regarded by some critics as one of the finest actors of the Golden Age of Hollywood. David Thomson hailed Mitchum as one of the three "most important actors in film history" along with Cary Grant and Barbara Stanwyck. Appraising Mitchum's career, Thomson wrote: "Since the war, no American actor has made more first-class films, in so many different moods." Roger Ebert wrote:

Robert Mitchum was my favorite movie star because he represented, for me, the impenetrable mystery of the movies. He knew the inside story. With his deep, laconic voice and his long face and those famous weary eyes, he was the kind of guy you'd picture in a saloon at closing time, waiting for someone to walk in through the door and break his heart.

Mitchum was the soul of film noir.

Mitchum, however, was self-effacing; in an interview with Barry Norman for the BBC about his contribution to cinema, Mitchum stopped Norman in mid-flow and in his typical nonchalant style, said, "Look, I have two kinds of acting. One on a horse and one off a horse. That's it." He had also succeeded in annoying some of his fellow actors by voicing his puzzlement at those who viewed the profession as challenging and hard work. He possessed a photographic memory that allowed him to remember lines with relative ease, and was also known for his proficiency with accents.

Director Robert Wise recalled that during the shooting of Blood on the Moon, Mitchum would mark his script with the letters "NAR," which meant "no acting required." He told Wise that he did not need a line and would give Wise a look instead. Dismissive of Method acting, when asked by George Peppard if he had studied it during filming of Home from the Hill, Mitchum jokingly responded that he had studied the "Smirnoff method".

This is not a tough job. You read a script. If you like the part and the money is O.K., you do it. Then you remember your lines. You show up on time. You do what the director tells you to do. When you finish, you rest and then go on to the next part. That's it.

— Mitchum's views on acting.

Mitchum's subtle and understated acting style sometimes garnered him criticism of sleepwalking through his performances in the early stage of his career. In his contemporary review of Out of the Past, James Agee commented that Mitchum's "curious languor" in love scenes suggested "Bing Crosby supersaturated with barbiturates." The review of Where Danger Lives in the Monthly Film Bulletin in 1951 said, "Robert Mitchum performs somnambulistically." David Thomson noticed that Mitchum "began to attract respectable attention" around the late 1950s. Writing for the Village Voice in 1973, Andrew Sarris pointed out that Mitchum, with his stoic presence on the screen that was "mistaken for a stone face without feelings," had been "grossly maligned as an actor," while he was actually "reborn in every movie, recreated in every relationship."

Mitchum had a solid reputation among the directors who worked with him. William A. Wellman thought Mitchum should have won the Academy Award for The Story of G.I. Joe and called him "one of the finest, most solid and real actors" in the world. Raoul Walsh recalled that Mitchum had impressed him as being "one of the finest natural actors" he had ever met. Charles Laughton, who directed him in The Night of the Hunter, considered him to be one of the best actors in the world and believed that he would have been the greatest Macbeth. John Huston felt that Mitchum was on the same pedestal of actors such as Marlon Brando, Richard Burton and Laurence Olivier. Vincente Minnelli wrote that few actors he had worked with brought "so much of themselves to a picture," and none did it "with such total lack of affectation" as he did. Howard Hawks praised Mitchum for being a hard worker, labeling the actor a "fraud" for pretending to not care about acting. David Lean said of him: "He is a master of stillness. Other actors act. Mitchum is. He has true delicacy and expressiveness, but his forte is his indelible identity. Simply by being there, Mitchum can make almost any other actor look like a hole in the screen."

Jane Greer, his co-star in Out of the Past and The Big Steal, said of him: "Bob would never be caught acting. He just is."

Robert De Niro, Clint Eastwood, Michael Madsen, and Mark Rylance have cited Mitchum as one of their favorite actors.

AFI's 100 Years...100 Stars ranked Mitchum as the 23rd-greatest male star of classic Hollywood cinema. AFI also recognized Max Cady and Reverend Harry Powell as the 28th and 29th greatest screen villains of all time in AFI's 100 Years...100 Heroes and Villains.

For his contribution to the film industry, Mitchum has a star on the Hollywood Walk of Fame at 6240 Hollywood Boulevard. He was posthumously inducted into the Hall of Great Western Performers at the National Cowboy & Western Heritage Museum in 2013.

Mitchum provided the voice of the famous American Beef Council commercials that touted "Beef ... it's what's for dinner", from 1992 until his death.

A "Mitchum's Steakhouse" operated in Trappe, Maryland, where Mitchum and his family lived from 1959 to 1965.

On December 10, 2022, a historical marker commemorating Mitchum was unveiled in his father's hometown of Lane, South Carolina.

== General and cited sources ==
=== Books ===
- Capua, Michelangelo (2022). Jean Simmons: Her Life and Career. Jefferson, North Carolina: McFarland & Company. ISBN 978-1-4766-8224-2.
- Clavin, Tom (2010). That Old Black Magic: Louis Prima, Keely Smith, and the Golden Age of Las Vegas. Chicago: Chicago Review Press. ISBN 978-1-55652-821-7.
- Couchman, Jeffrey (2009). The Night of the Hunter: A Biography of a Film. Evanston, Illinois: Northwestern University Press. ISBN 978-0-8101-2542-1.
- Eells, George (1984). Robert Mitchum. New York and Toronto: Franklin Watts. ISBN 978-0-531-09836-3.
- Evans, Peter (2013). Ava Gardner: The Secret Conversations. New York: Simon & Schuster. ISBN 978-1-4516-2769-5.
- Fishgall, Gary (2002). Gregory Peck: A Biography. New York: Scriber. ISBN 978-0-684-85290-4.
- Fleischer, Richard (1993). Just Tell Me When to Cry: A Memoir. New York: Carroll & Graf Publishers. ISBN 978-0-88184-944-8.
- Freese, Gene (2020). The Western Films of Robert Mitchum: Hollywood's Cowboy Rebel. Jefferson, North Carolina: McFarland & Company. ISBN 978-1-4766-7849-8.
- Huston, John (1980). An Open Book. New York: Alfred A. Knopf. ISBN 978-0-394-40465-3.
- Jewell, Richard B.; Harbin, Vernon (1982). The RKO Story. New York: Arlington House. ISBN 978-0-517-54656-7.
- Jewell, Richard B. (2016). Slow Fade to Black: The Decline of RKO Radio Pictures. Oakland, California: University of California Press. ISBN 978-0-520-28967-3.
- Klein, George; Crisafulli, Chuck (2011). Elvis: My Best Man: Radio Days, Rock 'n' Roll Nights, and My Lifelong Friendship with Elvis Presley. New York: Three Rivers Press. ISBN 978-0-307-45275-7.
- Longworth, Karina (2018). Seduction: Sex, Lies, and Stardom in Howard Hughes's Hollywood. New York: Custom House. ISBN 978-0-06-244051-8.
- Marill, Alvin H. (1978). Robert Mitchum on the Screen. South Brunswick and New York: A. S. Barnes and Company. ISBN 978-0-498-01847-3.
- McBride, Joseph (2013) [First published 1982 by University of California Press]. Hawks on Hawks. Lexington, Kentucky: University Press of Kentucky. ISBN 978-0-8131-4262-3.
- Minnelli, Vincente; Arce, Hector (1974). I Remember It Well. Garden City, New York: Doubleday & Company. ISBN 978-0-385-09522-8.
- Mitchum, John (1989). Them Ornery Mitchum Boys: The Adventures of Robert and John Mitchum. Pacifica, California: Creatures at Large. ISBN 978-0-940064-07-2.
- O'Steen, Sam; O'Steen, Bobbie (2001). Cut to the Chase: Forty-Five Years of Editing America's Favorite Movies. Los Angeles: Michael Wiese Productions. ISBN 978-0-941188-37-1.
- Ray, Nicholas; Ray, Susan (1993). I Was Interrupted: Nicholas Ray on Making Movies. Berkeley and Los Angeles: University of California Press. ISBN 978-0-520-08233-5.
- Roberts, Jerry (1992). Robert Mitchum: A Bio-Bibliography. Westport, Connecticut: Greenwood Press. ISBN 978-0-313-27547-0.
- Roberts, Jerry, ed. (2000). Mitchum: In His Own Words. New York: Limelight Editions. ISBN 978-0-87910-292-0.
- Roberts, Randy; Olson, James S. (1995). John Wayne: American. New York: Free Press. ISBN 978-0-02-923837-0.
- Schickel, Richard (1996). Clint Eastwood: A Biography. New York: Alfred A. Knopf. ISBN 978-0-679-42974-6.
- Server, Lee (2001). Robert Mitchum: "Baby, I Don't Care". New York: St Martin's Press. ISBN 978-0-312-28543-2.
- Thomson, David (2014). The New Biographical Dictionary of Film (6th ed.). New York: Alfred A. Knopf. ISBN 978-0-375-71184-8.
- Tomkies, Mike (1973) [First published 1972 by Henry Regnery Company]. The Robert Mitchum Story: "It Sure Beats Working". New York: Ballantine Books. ISBN 978-0-345-23484-1.
- Turner Classic Movies (2006). Leading Men: The 50 Most Unforgettable Actors of the Studio Era. San Francisco: Chronicle Books. ISBN 978-0-8118-5467-2.
- Turner Classic Movies (2008). Leading Couples: The Most Unforgettable Screen Romances of the Studio Era. San Francisco: Chronicle Books. ISBN 978-0-8118-6301-8.
- Walsh, Raoul (1974). Each Man in His Time: The Life Story of a Director. New York: Farrar, Straus and Giroux. ISBN 978-0-374-14553-8.
- Wellman, William A. (1974). A Short Time for Insanity: An Autobiography. New York: Hawthorn Books. ISBN 978-0-8015-6804-6.
- Wilson, Scott (2016). Resting Places: The Burial Sites of More Than 14,000 Famous Persons (3rd ed.). Jefferson, North Carolina: McFarland & Company. ISBN 978-0-7864-7992-4.

=== Documentaries and interviews ===
- Feldman, Gene, and Suzette Winter (Directors) (1991). Robert Mitchum: The Reluctant Star (TV Movie). US: Wombat Productions.

=== Interviews ===
- Mitchum, Robert (April 29, 1971). "The Dick Cavett Show: Robert Mitchum" (Interview). Interviewed by Dick Cavett. American Broadcasting Company.
- Mitchum, Robert (April 7, 1978). "The Tonight Show Starring Johnny Carson" (Interview). Interviewed by Johnny Carson. National Broadcasting Company.
