= 1979 in the United States =

- Decades: 1950s; 1960s; 1970s; 1980s; 1990s
- See also: History of the United States (1964–1980); Timeline of United States history (1970–1989); List of years in the United States

Events from the year 1979 in the United States.

== Incumbents ==
=== Federal government ===
- President: Jimmy Carter (D-Georgia)
- Vice President: Walter Mondale (D-Minnesota)
- Chief Justice: Warren E. Burger (Virginia)
- Speaker of the House of Representatives: Tip O'Neill (D-Massachusetts)
- Senate Majority Leader: Robert Byrd (D-West Virginia)
- Congress: 95th (until January 3), 96th (starting January 3)

==== State governments ====
Governors and lieutenant governors

=== Governors ===
- Governor of Alabama: George Wallace (Democratic) (until January 15), Fob James (Democratic) (starting January 15)
- Governor of Alaska: Jay Hammond (Republican)
- Governor of Arizona: Bruce Babbitt (Democratic)
- Governor of Arkansas:
  - until January 3: David Pryor (Democratic)
  - January 3-9: Joe Purcell (Democratic)
  - starting January 9: Bill Clinton (Democratic)
- Governor of California: Jerry Brown (Democratic)
- Governor of Colorado: Richard Lamm (Democratic)
- Governor of Connecticut: Ella T. Grasso (Democratic)
- Governor of Delaware: Pierre S. du Pont, IV (Republican)
- Governor of Florida: Reubin Askew (Democratic) (until January 2), Bob Graham (Democratic) (starting January 2)
- Governor of Georgia: George Busbee (Democratic)
- Governor of Hawaii: George Ariyoshi (Democratic)
- Governor of Idaho: John V. Evans (Democratic)
- Governor of Illinois: James R. Thompson (Republican)
- Governor of Indiana: Otis R. Bowen (Republican)
- Governor of Iowa: Robert D. Ray (Republican)
- Governor of Kansas: Robert F. Bennett (Republican) (until January 8), John W. Carlin (Democratic) (starting January 8)
- Governor of Kentucky: Julian M. Carroll (Democratic) (until December 11), John Y. Brown Jr. (Democratic) (starting December 11)
- Governor of Louisiana: Edwin W. Edwards (Democratic)
- Governor of Maine: James B. Longley (Independent) (until January 3), Joseph E. Brennan (Democratic) (starting January 3)
- Governor of Maryland: Marvin Mandel (Democratic) (until January 17), Harry R. Hughes (Democratic) (starting January 17)
- Governor of Massachusetts: Michael Dukakis (Democratic) (until January 4), Edward J. King (Democratic) (starting January 4)
- Governor of Michigan: William Milliken (Republican)
- Governor of Minnesota: Rudy Perpich (Democratic) (until January 4), Al Quie (Republican) (starting January 4)
- Governor of Mississippi: Cliff Finch (Democratic)
- Governor of Missouri: Joseph P. Teasdale (Democratic)
- Governor of Montana: Thomas Lee Judge (Democratic)
- Governor of Nebraska: J. James Exon (Democratic) (until January 4), Charles Thone (Republican) (starting January 4)
- Governor of Nevada: Mike O'Callaghan (Democratic) (until January 1), Robert List (Republican) (starting January 1)
- Governor of New Hampshire: Meldrim Thomson Jr. (Republican) (until January 4), Hugh J. Gallen (Democratic) (starting January 4)
- Governor of New Jersey: Brendan Byrne (Democratic)
- Governor of New Mexico: Jerry Apodaca (Democratic) (until January 1), Bruce King (Democratic) (starting January 1)
- Governor of New York: Hugh Carey (Democratic)
- Governor of North Carolina: Jim Hunt (Democratic)
- Governor of North Dakota: Arthur A. Link (Democratic)
- Governor of Ohio: Jim Rhodes (Republican)
- Governor of Oklahoma: David L. Boren (Democratic) (until January 8), George Nigh (Democratic) (starting January 8)
- Governor of Oregon: Robert W. Straub (Democratic) (until January 8), Victor G. Atiyeh (Republican) (starting January 8)
- Governor of Pennsylvania: Milton Shapp (Democratic) (until January 16), Dick Thornburgh (Republican) (starting January 16)
- Governor of Rhode Island: J. Joseph Garrahy (Democratic)
- Governor of South Carolina: James B. Edwards (Republican) (until January 10), Richard Riley (Democratic) (starting January 10)
- Governor of South Dakota: Harvey L. Wollman (Democratic) (until January 1), William J. Janklow (Republican) (starting January 1)
- Governor of Tennessee: Ray Blanton (Democratic) (until January 17), Lamar Alexander (Republican) (starting January 17)
- Governor of Texas: Dolph Briscoe (Democratic) (until January 16), Bill Clements (Republican) (starting January 16)
- Governor of Utah: Scott M. Matheson (Democratic)
- Governor of Vermont: Richard A. Snelling (Republican)
- Governor of Virginia: John N. Dalton (Republican)
- Governor of Washington: Dixy Lee Ray (Democratic)
- Governor of West Virginia: Jay Rockefeller (Democratic)
- Governor of Wisconsin: Martin J. Schreiber (Democratic) (until January 3), Lee S. Dreyfus (Republican) (starting January 3)
- Governor of Wyoming: Edgar J. Herschler (Democratic)

=== Lieutenant governors ===
- Lieutenant Governor of Alabama: Jere Beasley (Democratic) (until January 15), George McMillan (Democratic) (starting January 15)
- Lieutenant Governor of Alaska: Terry Miller (Republican)
- Lieutenant Governor of Arkansas: Joe Purcell (Democratic)
- Lieutenant Governor of California: Mervyn M. Dymally (Democratic) (until January 8), Mike Curb (Republican) (starting January 8)
- Lieutenant Governor of Colorado: George L. Brown (Democratic) (until January 10), Nancy Dick (Democratic) (starting January 10)
- Lieutenant Governor of Connecticut: Robert K. Killian (Democratic) (until January 3), William A. O'Neill (Democratic) (starting January 3)
- Lieutenant Governor of Delaware: James D. McGinnis (Democratic)
- Lieutenant Governor of Florida: J.H. Williams (Democratic) (until January 2), Wayne Mixson (Democratic) (starting January 2)
- Lieutenant Governor of Georgia: Zell Miller (Democratic)
- Lieutenant Governor of Hawaii: Jean King (Democratic)
- Lieutenant Governor of Idaho: William J. Murphy (Democratic) (until January 1), Phil Batt (Democratic) (starting January 1)
- Lieutenant Governor of Illinois: Dave O'Neal (Republican)
- Lieutenant Governor of Indiana: Robert D. Orr (Republican)
- Lieutenant Governor of Iowa: Arthur A. Neu (Republican) (until January 12), Terry E. Branstad (Republican) (starting January 12)
- Lieutenant Governor of Kansas: Shelby Smith (Republican) (until January 8), Paul V. Dugan (Democratic) (starting January 8)
- Lieutenant Governor of Kentucky: Thelma Stovall (Democratic) (until December 11), Martha Layne Collins (Democratic) (starting December 11)
- Lieutenant Governor of Louisiana: Jimmy Fitzmorris (Democratic)
- Lieutenant Governor of Maryland: Blair Lee III (political party unknown) (until January 17), Samuel Bogley (Democratic) (starting January 17)
- Lieutenant Governor of Massachusetts: Thomas P. O'Neill III (Democratic)
- Lieutenant Governor of Michigan: James Damman (Republican) (until month and day unknown), James H. Brickley (Republican) (starting month and day unknown)
- Lieutenant Governor of Minnesota: Alec G. Olson (Democratic) (until January 3), Lou Wangberg (Republican) (starting January 3)
- Lieutenant Governor of Mississippi: Evelyn Gandy (Democratic)
- Lieutenant Governor of Missouri: William C. Phelps (Republican)
- Lieutenant Governor of Montana: Ted Schwinden (Democratic)
- Lieutenant Governor of Nebraska: Gerald Whelan (Democratic) (until January 4), Roland Luedtke (Republican) (starting January 4)
- Lieutenant Governor of Nevada: Robert E. Rose (Democratic) (until January 1), Myron E. Leavitt (Democratic) (starting January 1)
- Lieutenant Governor of New Mexico: Robert E. Ferguson (Democratic) (until January 1), Roberto Mondragón (Democratic) (starting January 1)
- Lieutenant Governor of New York: Mario Cuomo (Democratic) (starting January 1)
- Lieutenant Governor of North Carolina: James C. Green (Democratic)
- Lieutenant Governor of North Dakota: Wayne G. Sanstead (Democratic)
- Lieutenant Governor of Ohio:
  - until January 8: Dick Celeste (Democratic)
  - January 8-November: George Voinovich (Republican)
  - starting November: vacant
- Lieutenant Governor of Oklahoma: George Nigh (Democratic) (until January 3), Spencer Bernard (Democratic) (starting January 3)
- Lieutenant Governor of Pennsylvania: Ernest P. Kline (Democratic) (until January 16), William Scranton, III (Republican) (starting January 16)
- Lieutenant Governor of Rhode Island: Thomas R. DiLuglio (Democratic)
- Lieutenant Governor of South Carolina: W. Brantley Harvey Jr. (Democratic) (until January 10), Nancy Stevenson (Democratic) (starting January 10)
- Lieutenant Governor of South Dakota: vacant (until January 1), Lowell C. Hansen II (Republican) (starting January 1)
- Lieutenant Governor of Tennessee: John S. Wilder (Democratic)
- Lieutenant Governor of Texas: William P. Hobby Jr. (Democratic)
- Lieutenant Governor of Utah: David Smith Monson (Republican)
- Lieutenant Governor of Vermont: T. Garry Buckley (Republican) (until January 10), Madeleine M. Kunin (Democratic) (starting January 10)
- Lieutenant Governor of Virginia: Chuck Robb (Democratic)
- Lieutenant Governor of Washington: John Cherberg (Democratic)
- Lieutenant Governor of Wisconsin: Martin J. Schreiber (Democratic) (until January 3), Russell A. Olson (Republican) (starting January 3)

== Events ==
=== January ===
- January 1 – The United States and the People's Republic of China establish full diplomatic relations.
- January 4 – The State of Ohio agrees to pay $675,000 to families of those who were dead or injured from the Kent State shootings.
- January 9 – The Music for UNICEF Concert is held at the United Nations General Assembly to raise money for UNICEF and promote the Year of the Child. It is broadcast the following day in the United States and around the world. Hosted by The Bee Gees, other performers include Donna Summer, ABBA, Rod Stewart and Earth, Wind & Fire. A soundtrack album is later released.
- January 19 – Former U.S. Attorney General John N. Mitchell is released on parole after 19 months at a federal prison in Alabama.
- January 21 – Super Bowl XIII: The Pittsburgh Steelers defeat the Dallas Cowboys 35–31 at the Miami Orange Bowl in Miami, Florida.
- January 29 – Brenda Ann Spencer opens fire at a school in San Diego, California, killing two faculty members and wounding eight students. Her response to the action, "I don’t like Mondays," inspired the Boomtown Rats to make a song of the same name.
- January 1–31
  - Averaged over the contiguous United States, this is the coldest month since at least 1880 with a mean temperature of 21.92 °F or −5.60 °C as against an 1895 to 1974 January mean of 29.99 °F or −1.12 °C.
  - The maximum temperature at 31.26 °F or −0.41 °C is also the coldest on record for any month and the only occasion when the area-averaged contiguous US mean maximum has fallen below freezing.

=== February ===
- February 13 – The intense February 13, 1979 Windstorm strikes western Washington and sinks a 1/2-mile-long section of the Hood Canal Bridge.
- February 14 – In Kabul, Muslim extremists kidnap the American ambassador to Afghanistan, Adolph Dubs, who is later killed during a gunfight between his kidnappers and police.
- February 20 – This Old House premieres on PBS.
- February 26 – A total solar eclipse occurred in North America.
- February 27 – The annual Mardi Gras celebration in New Orleans, Louisiana is canceled due to a strike called by the New Orleans Police Department.
- February 1–28 – With a statewide water-equivalent precipitation average of only 0.72 inches (18.3 mm), this is Alaska's driest month since records began in 1925, and first driest month since being admitted to statehood in 1959. (Note: For comparison the contiguous US has had only one month drier than February 1979 in Alaska from coast to coast, namely October 1952 with only 0.54 inches or 13.7 millimetres.)

=== March ===
- March 4 – The U.S. Voyager I space probe photos reveal Jupiter's rings.
- March 25 – The first fully functional Space Shuttle orbiter, Columbia, is delivered to the John F. Kennedy Space Center, to be prepared for its first launch.
- March 26 – In a ceremony at the White House, President Anwar Sadat of Egypt and Prime Minister Menachem Begin of Israel sign the Egyptian–Israeli Peace Treaty.
- March 29 – America's most serious nuclear power plant accident at Three Mile Island, Pennsylvania.

=== April ===
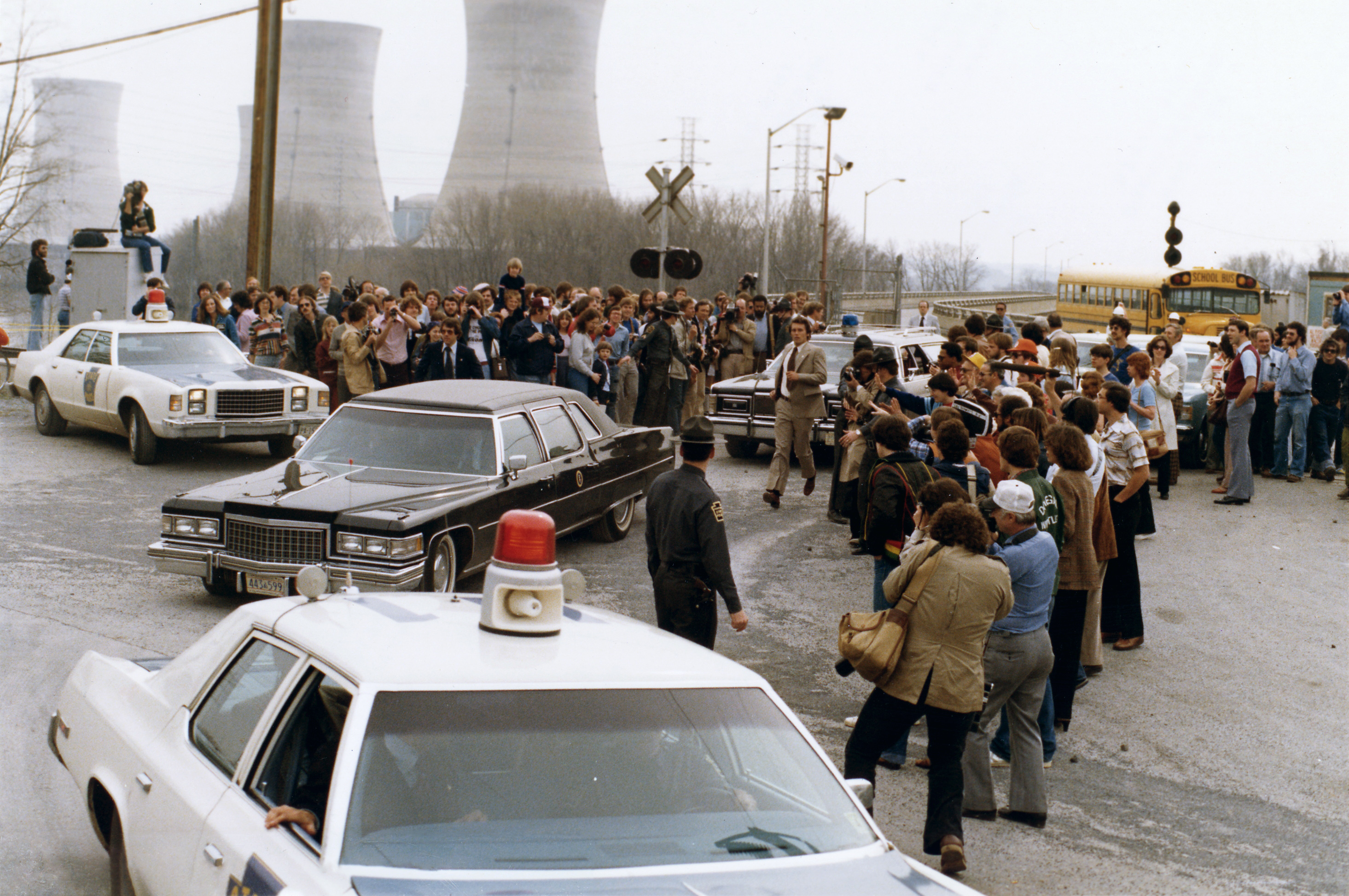
April 1: President Jimmy Carter leaving Three Mile Island for Middletown, Pennsylvania

- April 1 – Nickelodeon debuts on cable television, playing children's television shows 24 hours a day. Pinwheel, which first premiered on the channel C-3 in 1977, was one of the first shows to be broadcast on the channel.
- April 2 – Major League Baseball umpires go on strike, forcing replacements from the minor leagues, college and high school to be used for the first seven weeks of the season. Union umpires return to work May 18.
- April 9 – The 51st Academy Awards ceremony, hosted by Johnny Carson, is held at Dorothy Chandler Pavilion in Los Angeles. Michael Cimino's The Deer Hunter wins five awards, including Best Picture and Best Director for Cimino. The film is also tied with Warren Beatty and Buck Henry's Heaven Can Wait in receiving nine nominations each. The ceremony marks the final public appearances of actors Jack Haley and John Wayne; they would both die two months later.
- April 10 – A tornado hits Wichita Falls, Texas, killing 42.
- April 20 – President Jimmy Carter is attacked by a swamp rabbit while fishing in his hometown of Plains, Georgia.
- April 22 – The Albert Einstein Memorial is unveiled at the National Academy of Sciences in Washington, DC.

=== May ===
- May – The unemployment rate drops to 5.6%, the low point for the late 1970s business cycle and the lowest since July 1974.
- May 9 – A Unabomber bomb injures Northwestern University graduate student John Harris.
- May 21
  - In San Francisco, gay people riot after hearing the verdict for Dan White, assassin of Mayor George Moscone and Supervisor Harvey Milk.
  - The Montreal Canadiens defeat the New York Rangers 4 games to 1 in the best-of-seven series, winning the Stanley Cup.
- May 25
  - American Airlines Flight 191: In Chicago, a DC-10 crashes during takeoff at O'Hare International Airport, killing 271 on board and 2 people on the ground. It is the deadliest aviation accident to have occurred in the United States.
  - John Spenkelink is executed in Florida, in the first use of the electric chair in America after the reintroduction of death penalty in 1976.
  - Six-year-old Etan Patz disappears in New York City. The incident helps spark the missing children's movement.
- May 27 – Indianapolis 500: Rick Mears wins the race for the first time, and car owner Roger Penske for the second time.

=== June ===
- June – McDonald's introduces the Happy Meal, there was no toy as seen from the commercial.
- June 1 – The Seattle SuperSonics win the NBA Championship against the Washington Bullets.
- June 18 – Jimmy Carter and Leonid Brezhnev sign the SALT II agreement in Vienna.
- June 20 – A Nicaraguan National Guard soldier kills ABC TV news correspondent Bill Stewart and his interpreter Juan Espinosa. Other members of the news crew capture the killing on tape.

=== July ===
- July 2 – The Susan B. Anthony dollar is introduced in the U.S.
- July 3 – President Jimmy Carter signs the first directive for secret aid to the opponents of the pro-Soviet regime in Kabul.
- July 8 – Los Angeles passes its gay and lesbian civil rights bill.
- July 11 – NASA's first orbiting space station Skylab begins its return to Earth, after being in orbit for 6 years and 2 months.
- July 12 – A Disco Demolition Night publicity stunt goes awry at Comiskey Park, forcing the Chicago White Sox to forfeit their game against the Detroit Tigers. Local Rock Radio station WLUP attended the event
- July 15 – President Carter speaks to Americans about ‘'a crisis of confidence.'’ The speech will come to be known as ‘'the malaise speech,’’ though Carter never used the word ‘'malaise.'’
- July 17 – Nicaraguan dictator General Anastasio Somoza Debayle resigns and flees to Miami, Florida.
- July 19 – The Sandinista National Liberation Front concludes a successful revolutionary campaign against the U.S.-backed Somoza dictatorship and assumes power in Nicaragua.

=== August ===
- August 2 – New York Yankees catcher and team captain Thurman Munson is killed in an airplane crash at age 32 during touch-and-go landings in Canton, Ohio.
- August 6 – The 5.7 M_{w} Coyote Lake earthquake affected the South Bay and Central Coast areas of California with a maximum Mercalli intensity of VII (Very strong), causing 16 injuries and $500,000 in damage.
- August 9 – Raymond Washington, co-founder of the Crips, today one of the largest, most notorious gangs in the United States, is shot and killed 5 months after his arrest for quadruple murder (his killers have not yet been identified).
- August 10 – Michael Jackson releases his first breakthrough album Off the Wall. It sells 7 million copies in the United States alone, making it a 7× platinum album.
- August 29 – A national referendum is held in which Somali voters approve a new liberal constitution, promulgated by President Siad Barre to placate the United States.

=== September ===
- September 1 – The U.S. Pioneer 11 becomes the first spacecraft to visit Saturn, when it passes the planet at a distance of 21,000 km.
- September 12 – Hurricane Frederic makes landfall at 10:00 p.m. on Alabama's Gulf Coast.
- September 16 – The Sugarhill Gang release Rapper's Delight, the first rap single to become a Top 40 hit on the Billboard Hot 100.
- September 23 – The largest anti-nuclear demonstration to date is held in New York City, where almost 200,000 people attend.

=== October ===
- October 1–6 – Pope John Paul II visits six cities in the United States.
- October 14 – A major gay rights march in the United States takes place in Washington, D.C., involving many tens of thousands of people.
- October 15 – The 6.4 M_{w} Imperial Valley earthquake affected Southern California and northern Baja California with a maximum Mercalli intensity of IX (Violent), causing 91 injuries and $30 million in damage.
- October 17
  - President Jimmy Carter signs a law establishing the Department of Education.
  - 1979 World Series: The Pittsburgh Pirates defeat the Baltimore Orioles, 4 games to 3, to win their 5th World Series Title.

=== November ===
- November 1 – Iran hostage crisis: Iranian Ayatollah Ruhollah Khomeini urges his people to demonstrate on November 4 and to expand attacks on United States and Israeli interests.
- November 2 – Assata Shakur (ne' Joanne Chesimard), a former member of Black Panther Party and Black Liberation Army, is liberated from a Clinton, New Jersey prison and soon shuttled off to Cuba where she remains under political asylum.
- November 3 – Greensboro massacre in Greensboro, North Carolina, five members of the Communist Workers Party are shot to death and seven are wounded by a group of Klansmen and neo-Nazis, during a "Death to the Klan" rally.
- November 4 – Iran hostage crisis begins: 3,000 Iranian radicals, mostly students, invade the U.S. Embassy in Tehran and take 90 hostages (53 of whom are American). They demand that the United States send the former Shah of Iran back to stand trial.
- November 6 – Kentucky Fried Chicken magnate and former Boston Celtics owner John Y. Brown Jr. is elected Governor of Kentucky.
- November 7 – U.S. Senator Ted Kennedy announces that he will challenge President Jimmy Carter for the 1980 Democratic presidential nomination.
- November 9 – Nuclear false alarm: the NORAD computers and the Alternate National Military Command Center in Fort Ritchie, Maryland detected purported massive Soviet nuclear strike. After reviewing the raw data from satellites and checking the early warning radars, the alert was cancelled.
- November 12 – Iran hostage crisis: In response to the hostage situation in Tehran, U.S. President Jimmy Carter orders a halt to all oil imports into the United States from Iran.
- November 14 – Iran hostage crisis: U.S. President Jimmy Carter issues Executive Order 12170, freezing all Iranian assets in the United States and U.S. banks in response to the hostage crisis.
- November 17 – Iran hostage crisis: Iranian leader Ruhollah Khomeini orders the release of 13 female and African American hostages being held at the U.S. Embassy in Tehran.
- November 21 – After false radio reports from the Ayatollah Khomeini that the Americans had occupied the Grand Mosque in Mecca, the United States Embassy in Islamabad, Pakistan is attacked by a mob and set afire, killing four (see Foreign relations of Pakistan).

=== December ===
- December 3
  - Eleven fans are killed during a stampede for seats before a The Who concert at the Riverfront Coliseum in Cincinnati, Ohio.
  - The United States dollar exchange rate with the Deutsche Mark falls to 1.7079 DM, the all-time low so far; this record is not broken until November 5, 1987.
- December 6 – The world premiere for Star Trek: The Motion Picture is held at the Smithsonian Institution in Washington, D.C.
- December 8 – U.S. Representative David C. Treen is elected Governor of Louisiana, becoming Louisiana's first Republican elected Governor in over 100 years.
- December 21 – Chrysler receives government loan guarantees upon the request of CEO Lee Iacocca.

==== December 1, 1978 to February 28, 1979 ====
- This is the coldest winter over the contiguous US since at least 1895 with a mean temperature of 26.62 °F or −2.99 °C as against an 1895/1896 to 1973/1974 seasonal mean of 31.94 °F or −0.03 °C. Except for normally frigid upstate Maine, all of the conterminous United States was below average for the winter, an occurrence previously seen only in 1898/1899 and 1909/1910.
- Both the contiguous US winter mean maximum temperature at 36.73 °F or 2.63 °C (1895/1896 to 1973/1974 mean 42.44 °F or 5.80 °C) and the minimum temperature at 16.51 °F or −8.61 °C (1895/1896 to 1973/1974 mean 21.44 °F or −5.87 °C) are the coldest since at least 1895.

=== Ongoing ===
- Cold War (1947–1991)
- Détente (c. 1969–1979)
- 1970s energy crisis (1973–1980)
- Iran hostage crisis (1979–1981)

== Births ==
=== January ===
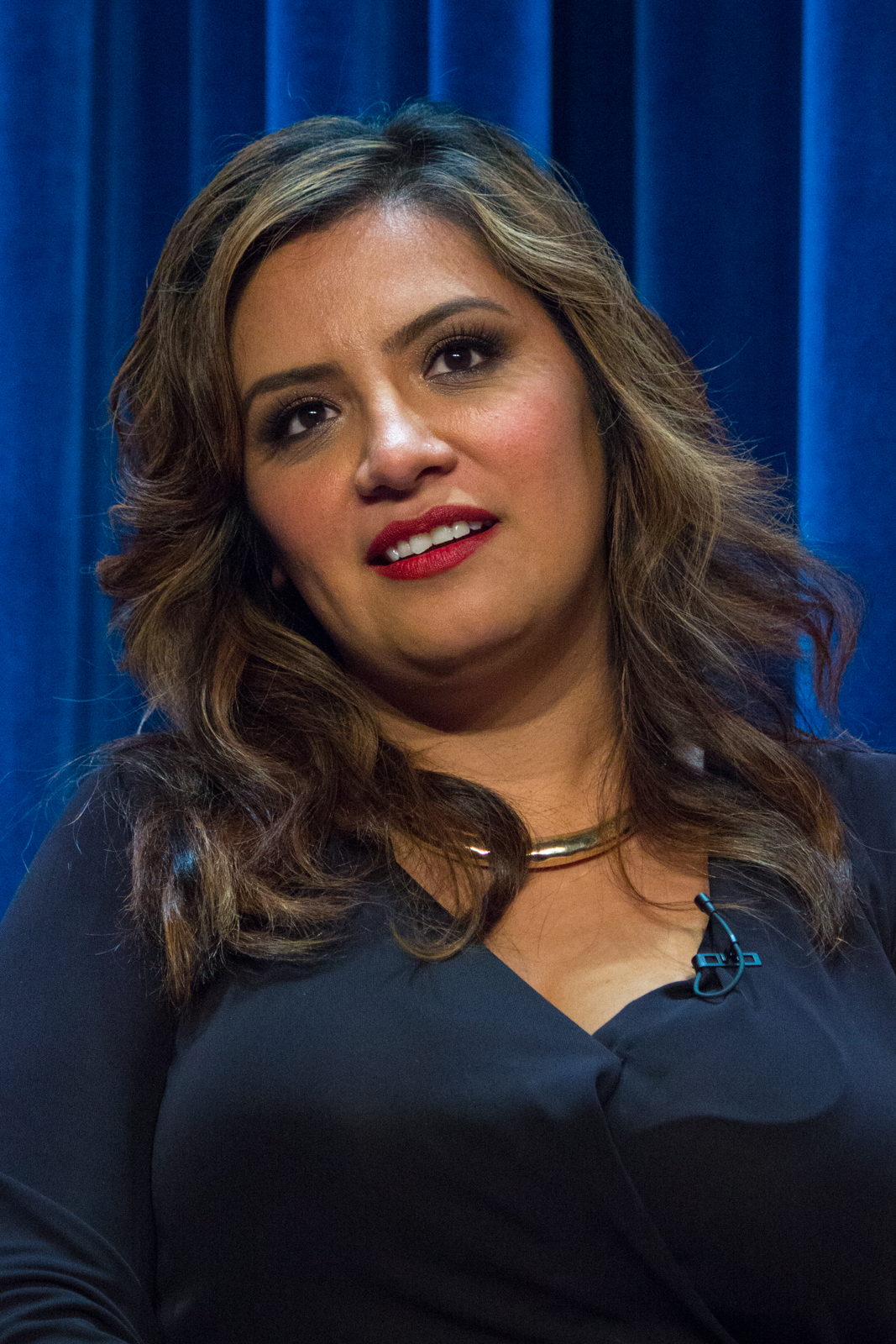
Cristela Alonzo

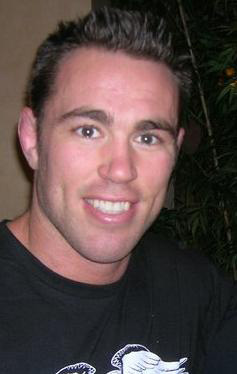
Jake Shields

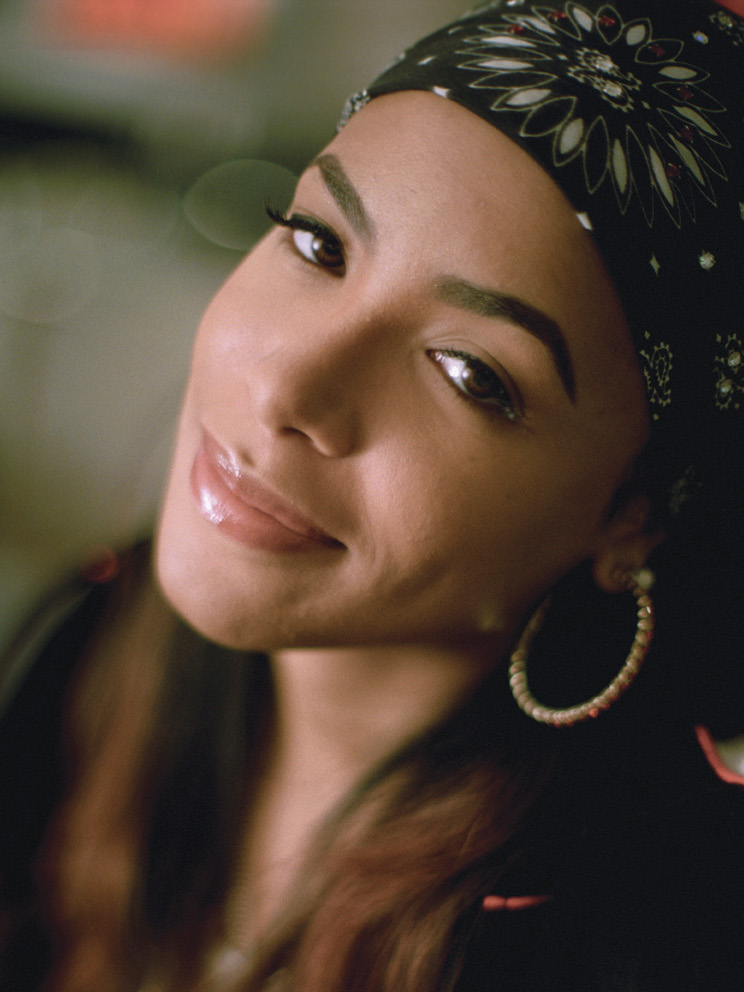
Aaliyah

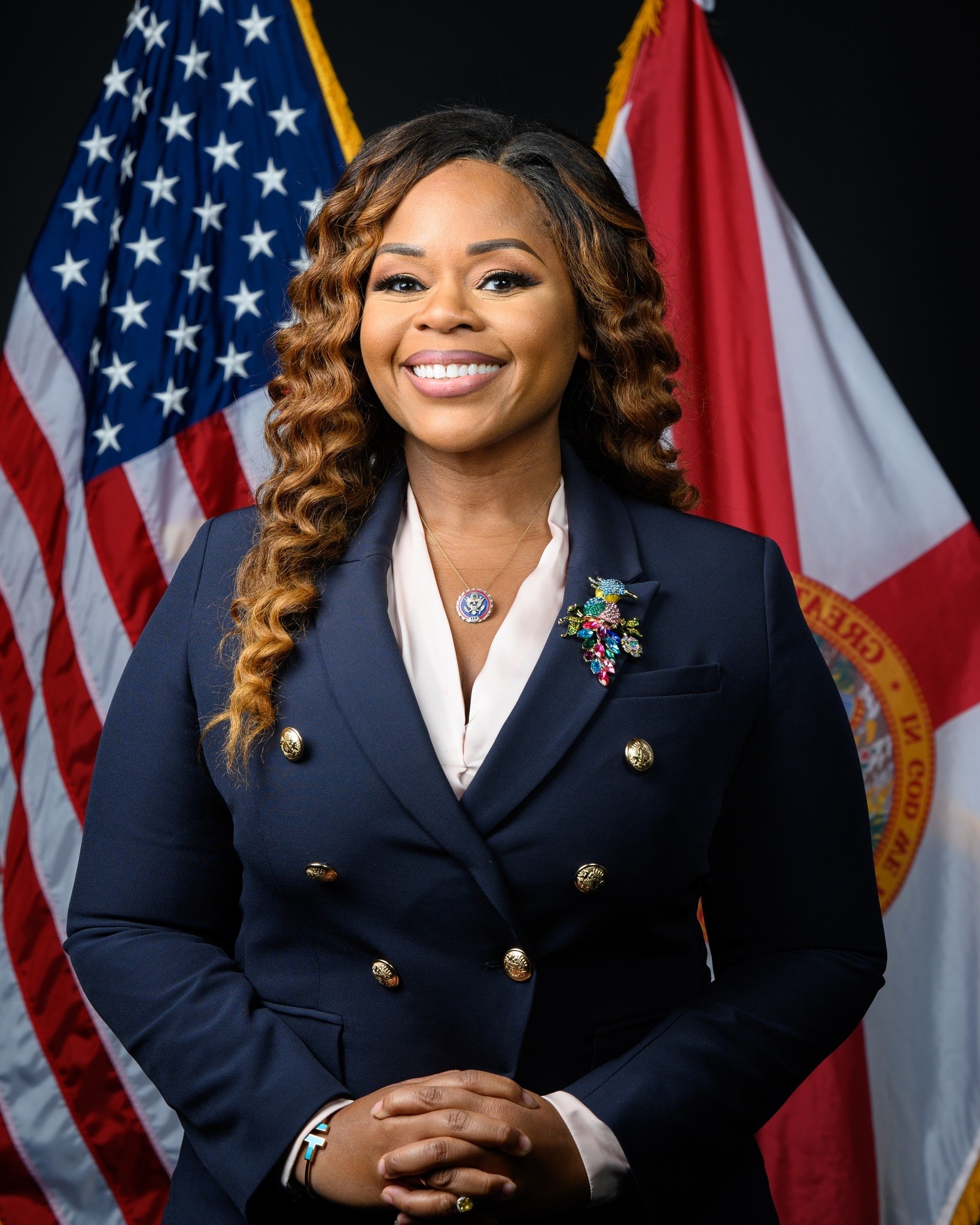
Sheila Cherfilus-McCormick

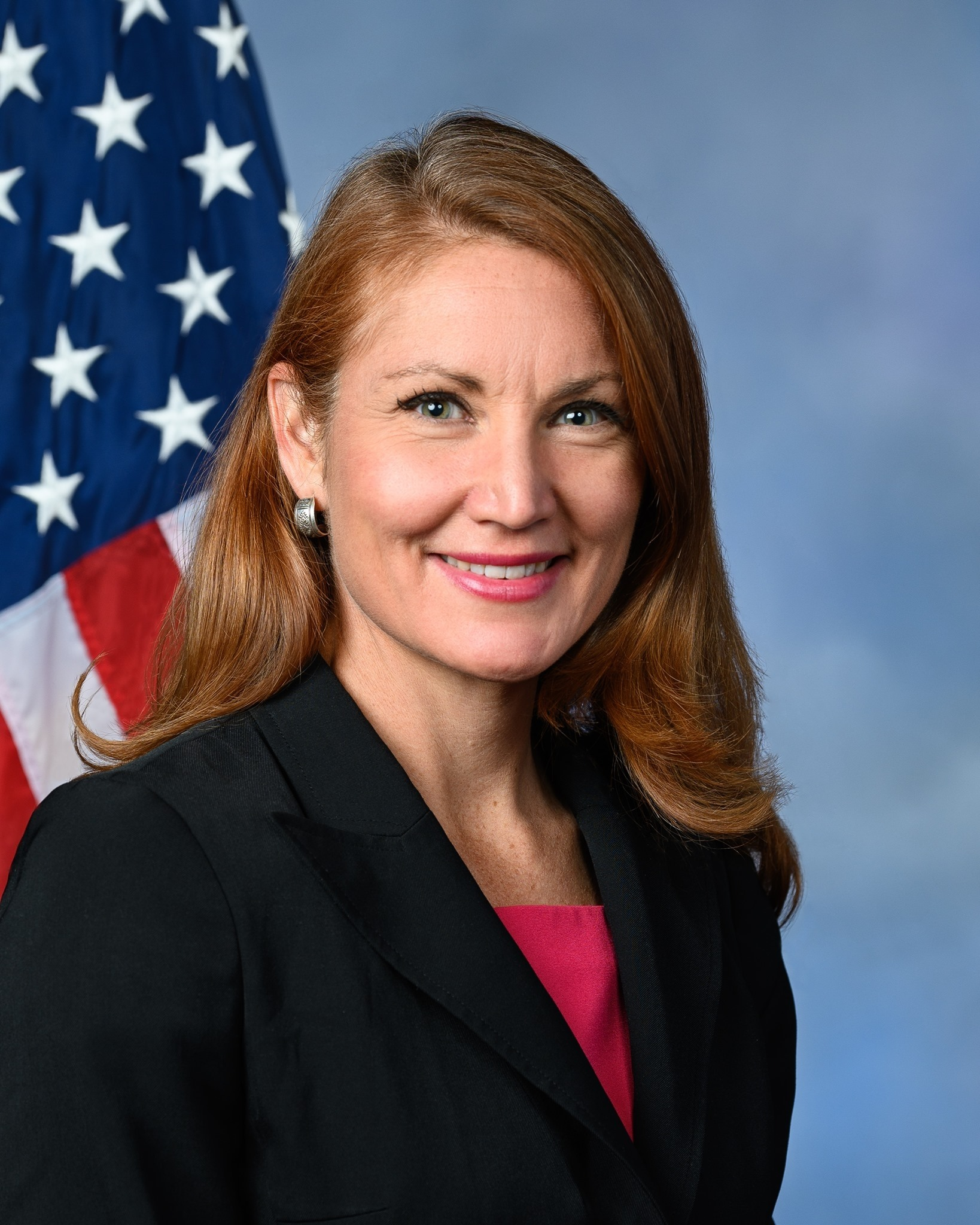
Melanie Stansbury

- January 1
  - Brody Dalle, singer/songwriter, guitarist, and vocalist for The Distillers
  - Ian Fowles, guitarist
  - Skyler Stone, actor and television host
- January 2
  - Micah Albert, photojournalist
  - Erica Hubbard, actress
- January 3 – Amanda Rowan, photographer, filmmaker, and actress
- January 6 – Cristela Alonzo, actress and comedian
- January 7 – Reggie Austin, actor
- January 8
  - Melvin Carter, politician, mayor of St. Paul, Minnesota
  - Windell Middlebrooks, actor (d. 2015)
- January 9
  - Jake Shields, mixed martial artist
  - Joshua Harto, actor
- January 11
  - Wyatt Allen, Olympic rower
  - Terence Morris, basketball player
  - Jeanne Sagan, bassist for Crossing Rubicon, All That Remains (2006–2015), and The Acacia Strain (2003)
- January 13
  - Jill Wagner, actress and television personality
- January 14
  - Chris Albright, soccer player
  - Angela Lindvall, model
- January 15 – Drew Brees, football player
- January 16 – Aaliyah, R&B singer/actress (d. 2001)
- January 19
  - Coral Smith, television personality
  - Spider Loc, rapper and actor
- January 20 – Rob Bourdon, drummer for Linkin Park
- January 22 – Saheed Aderinto, Nigerian-born professor and historian
- January 23
  - Kevin Braswell, basketball player and coach (d. 2025)
  - Larry Hughes, basketball player
- January 24
  - Tatyana Ali, actress
  - Kyle Brandt, actor and television personality
- January 25
  - Sheila Cherfilus-McCormick, politician
  - Christine Lakin, actress
- January 26
  - Natasha Cornett, criminal sentenced to life imprisonment for the Lillelid murders
  - Sara Rue, actress
- January 29
  - Jedediah Bila, television host and author
  - B. J. Flores, boxer
  - April Scott, model, actress, and producer
- January 30 – Jorge Alves, ice hockey player
- January 31 – Melanie Stansbury, politician

=== February ===
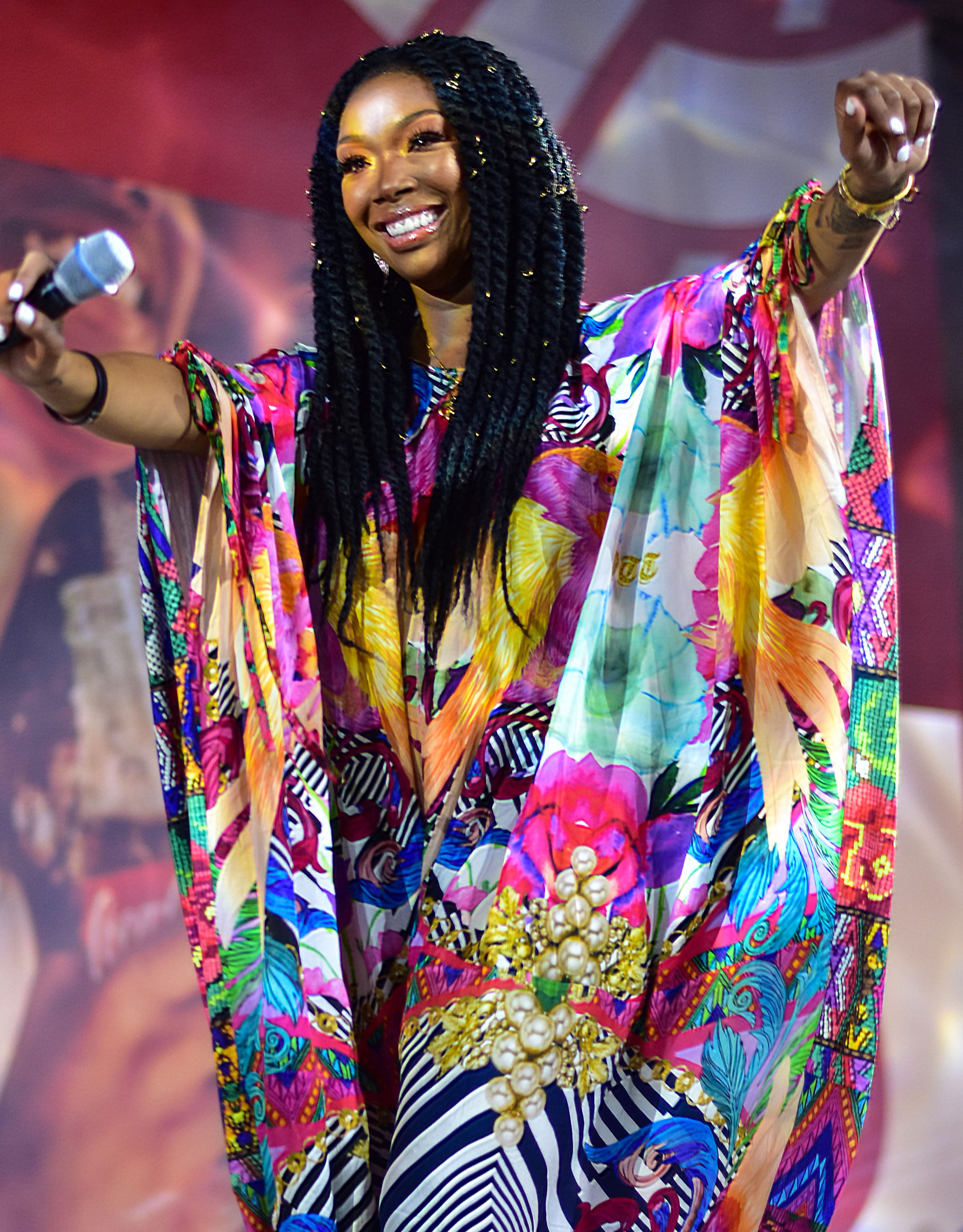
Brandy

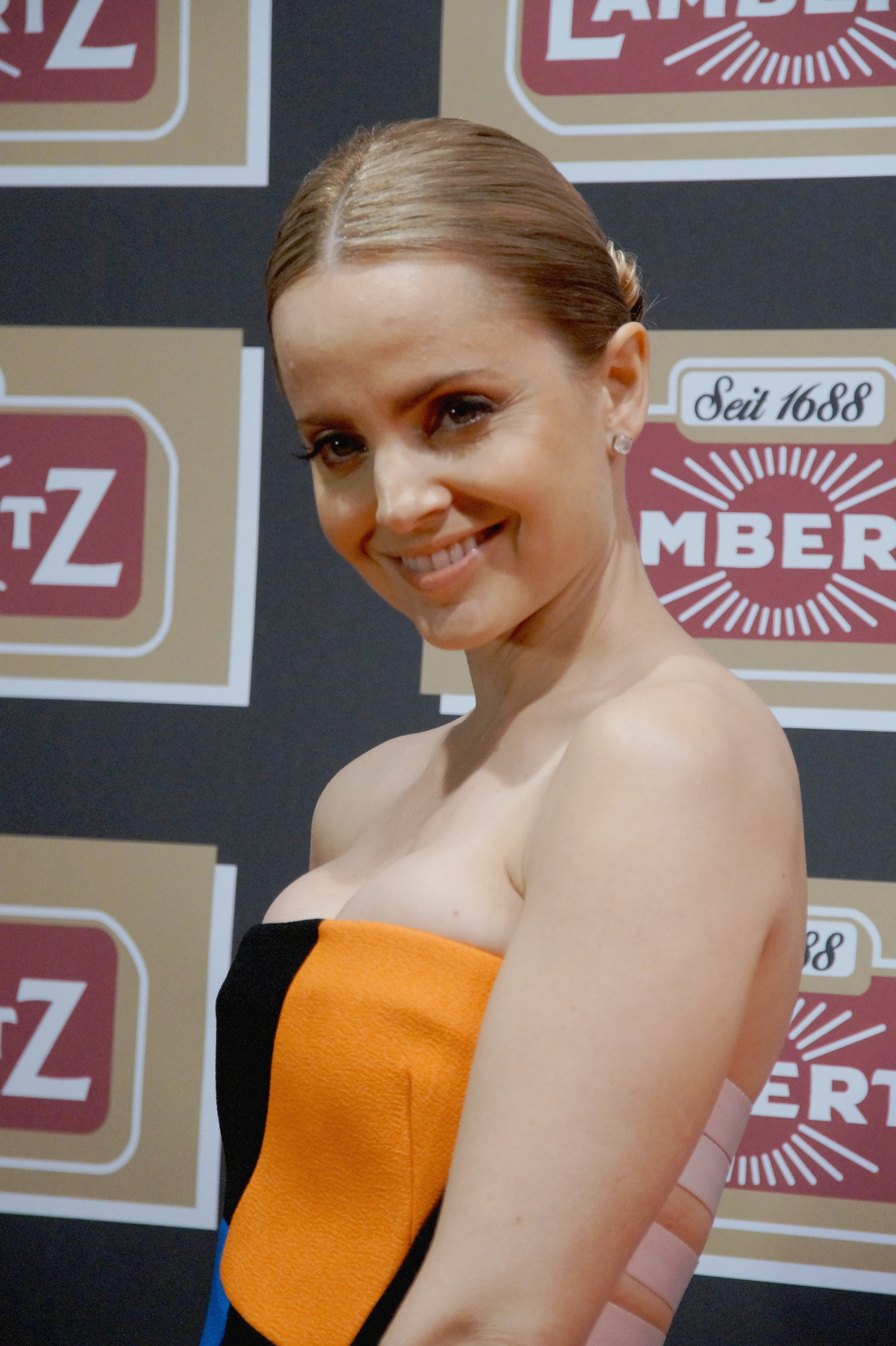
Mena Suvari

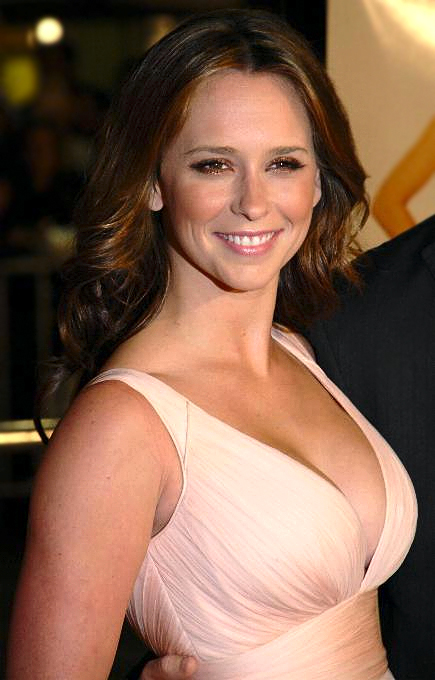
Jennifer Love Hewitt

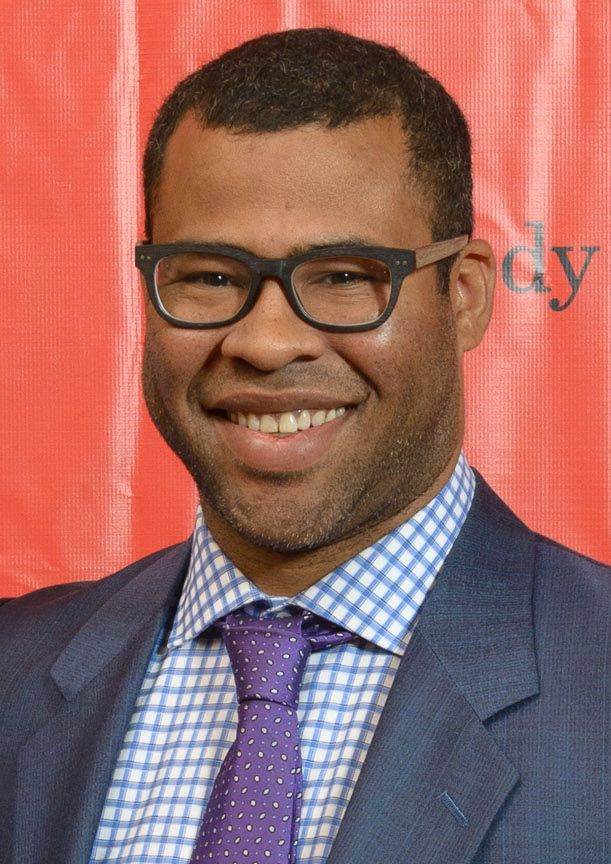
Jordan Peele

- February 1
  - Julie and Nancy Augustyniak Goffi, soccer players and twin sisters
- February 2 – Mayer Hawthorne, soul singer
- February 4
  - Rebecca Alexander, psychotherapist and author
  - Andrei Arlovski, Belarusian-born mixed martial artist
  - Tabitha Brown, actress
  - Ben Lerner, writer
  - Jodi Shilling, actress
- February 5
  - Jeremy Boreing, screenwriter
  - Gil McKinney, actor
- February 7
  - Andy Akiho, composer
  - Dan Kaminsky, computer security expert (d. 2021)
  - Cerina Vincent, actress and writer
- February 8
  - Emmanuel Akah, British-born football player
  - Josh Keaton, actor
- February 10 – Paul Waggoner, guitarist for Between the Buried and Me
- February 11 – Brandy Norwood, singer and actress
- February 12
  - Antonio Chatman, football player
  - Yemi Mobolade, Nigerian-born politician, mayor of Colorado Springs, Colorado
- February 13 – Mena Suvari, American actress
- February 17
  - Justin Fairfax, lawyer and politician, lieutenant-governor of Virginia (d. 2026)
  - Eva Gardner, bassist for The Mars Volta
  - Bear McCreary, musician and composer
  - Conrad Ricamora, actor and singer
  - Josh Willingham, baseball player
- February 21
  - Tituss Burgess, actor and singer
  - Jennifer Love Hewitt, actress and singer
  - Jordan Peele, actor, comedian, writer, director, and producer
- February 23
  - Amazon Eve, model, fitness trainer, and actress
  - Chris Aguila, baseball player
  - S. E. Cupp, journalist and author
  - D'Angelo 'D Roc' Holmes, rapper and member of Ying Yang Twins
- February 24 – Travis Grantham, politician
- February 25 – Jennifer Ferrin, actress
- February 28
  - Geoffrey Arend, actor
  - Chris Hayes, journalist

=== March ===
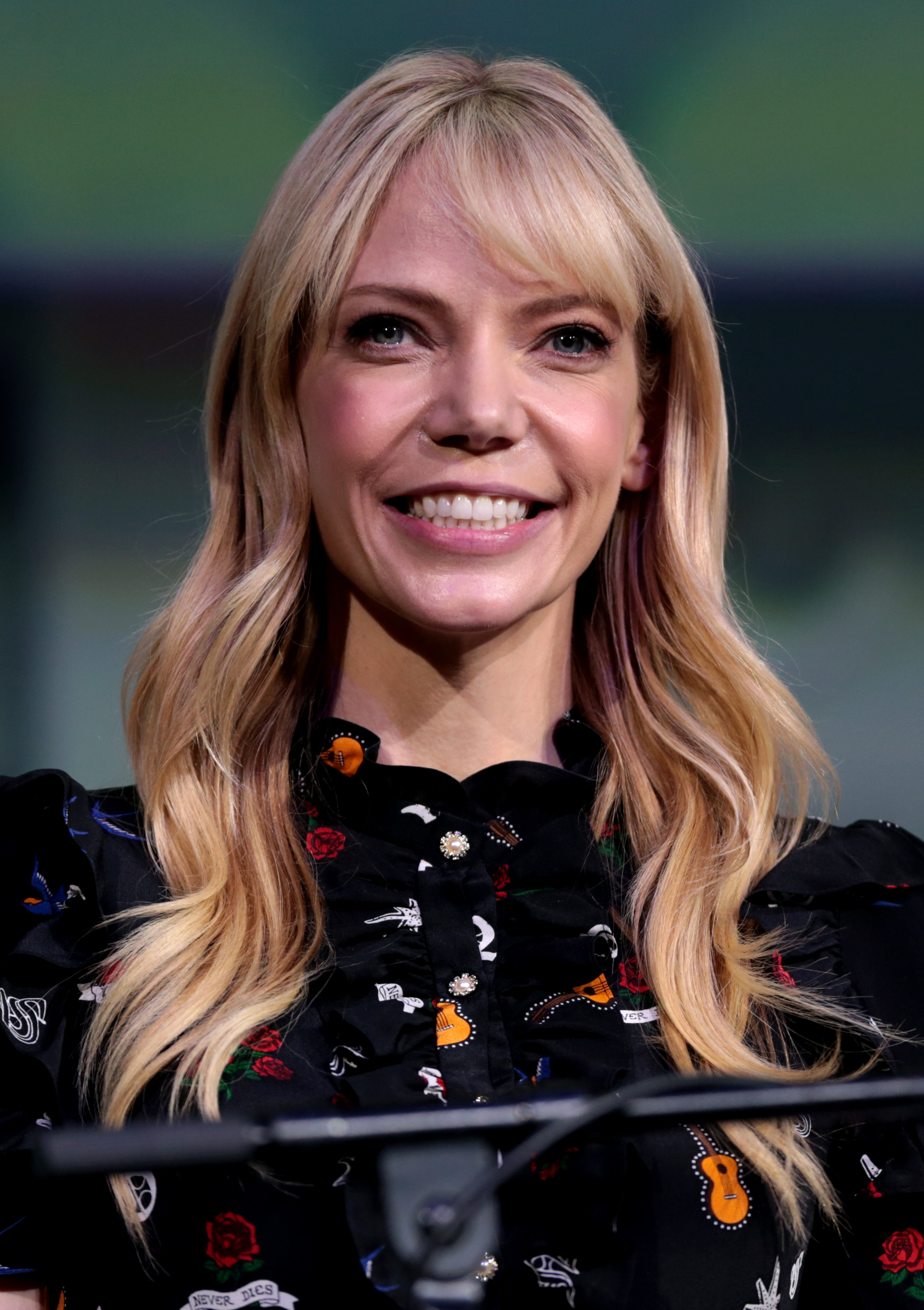
Riki Lindhome

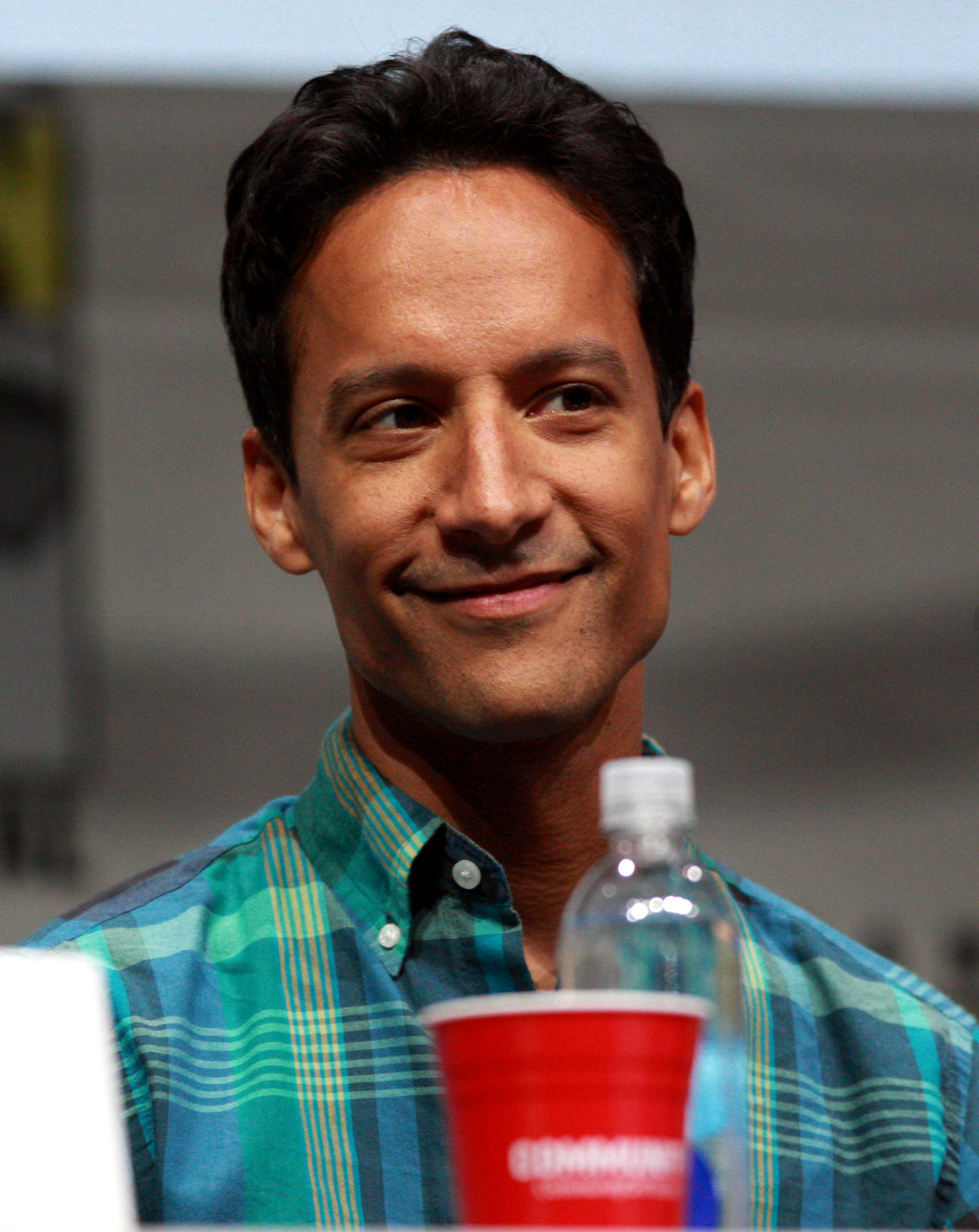
Danny Pudi

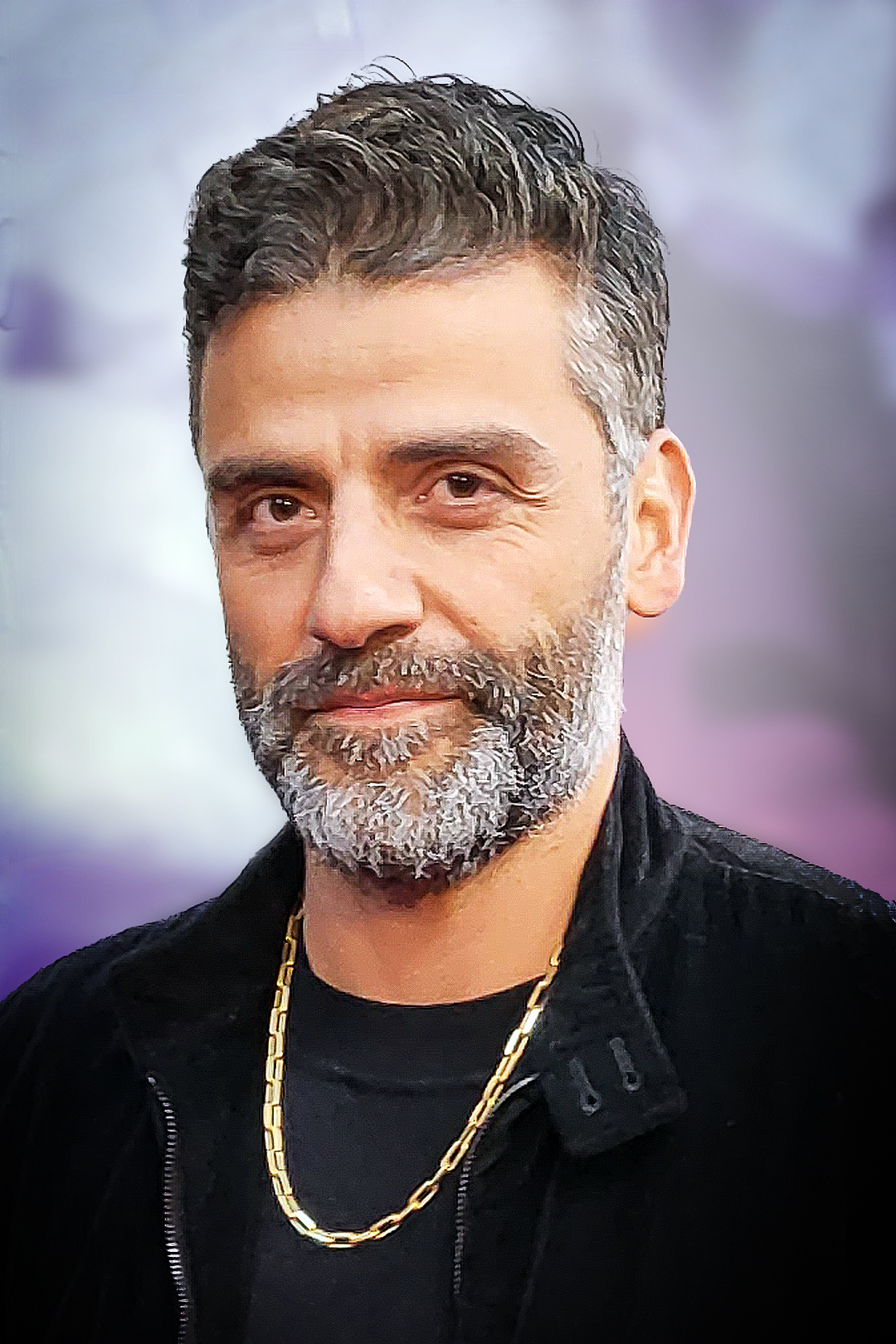
Oscar Isaac

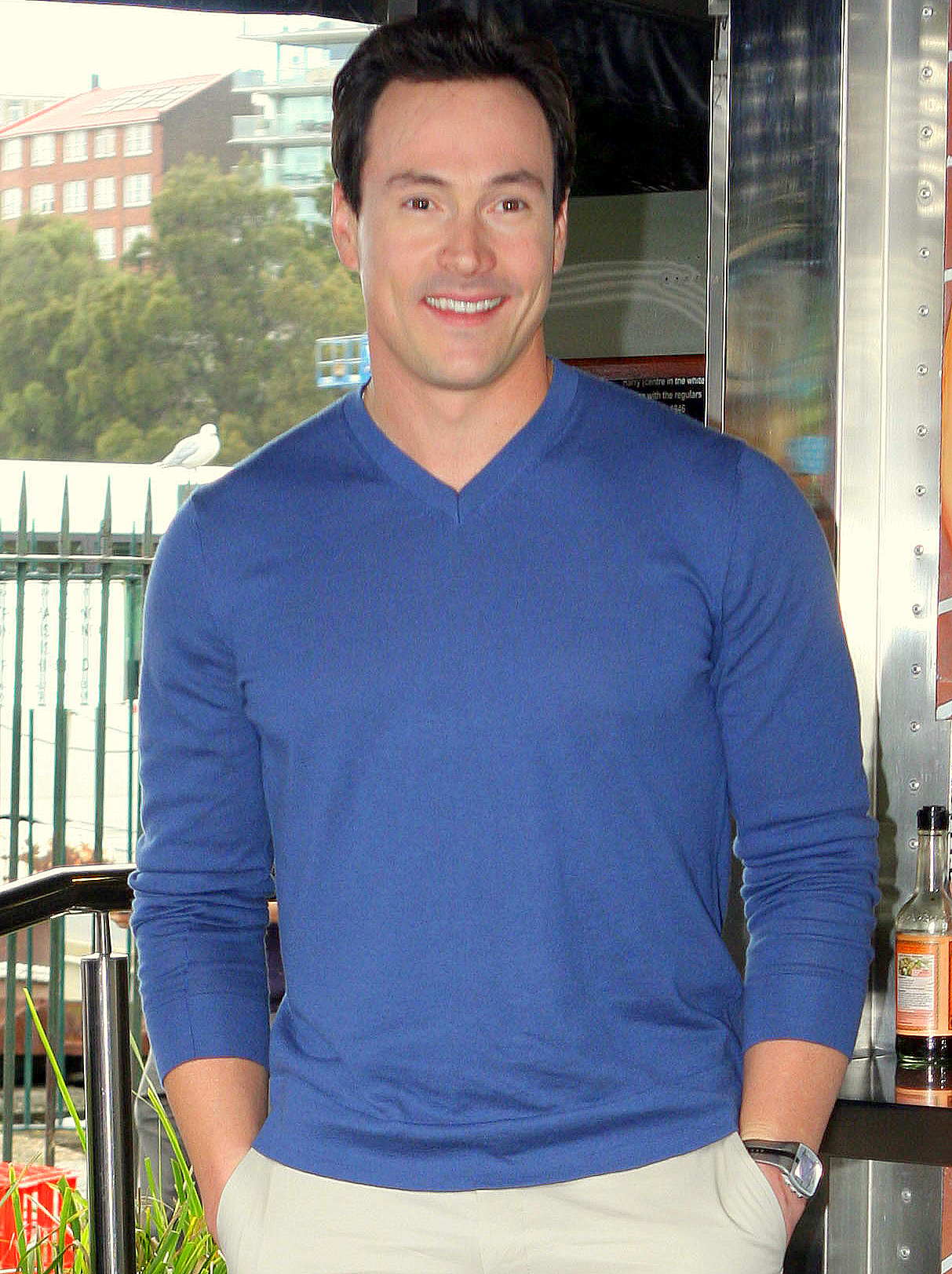
Chris Klein

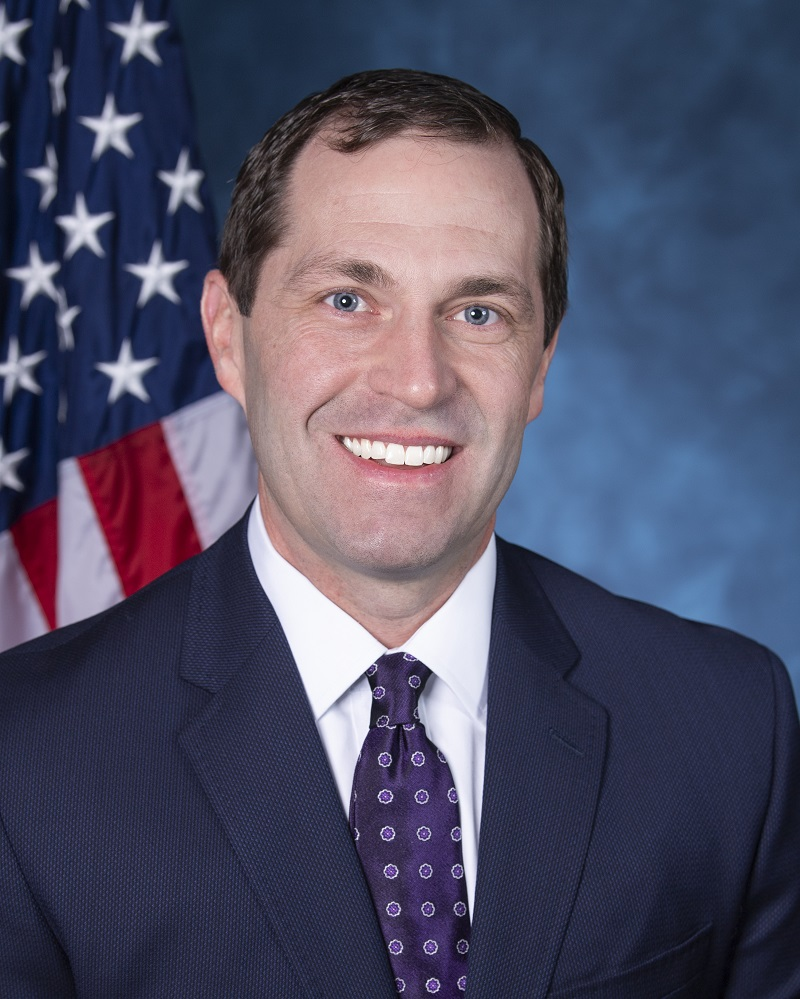
Jason Crow

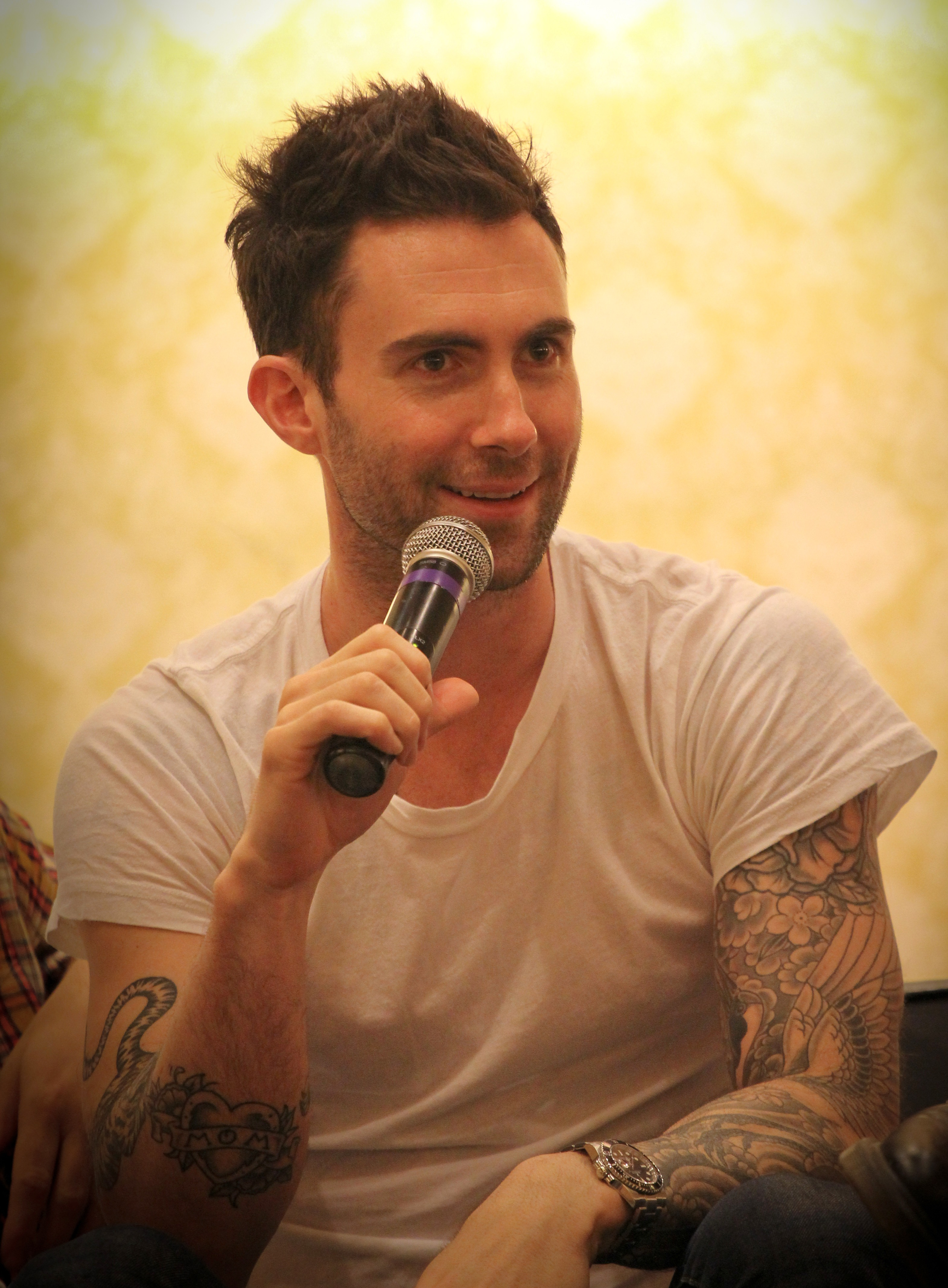
Adam Levine

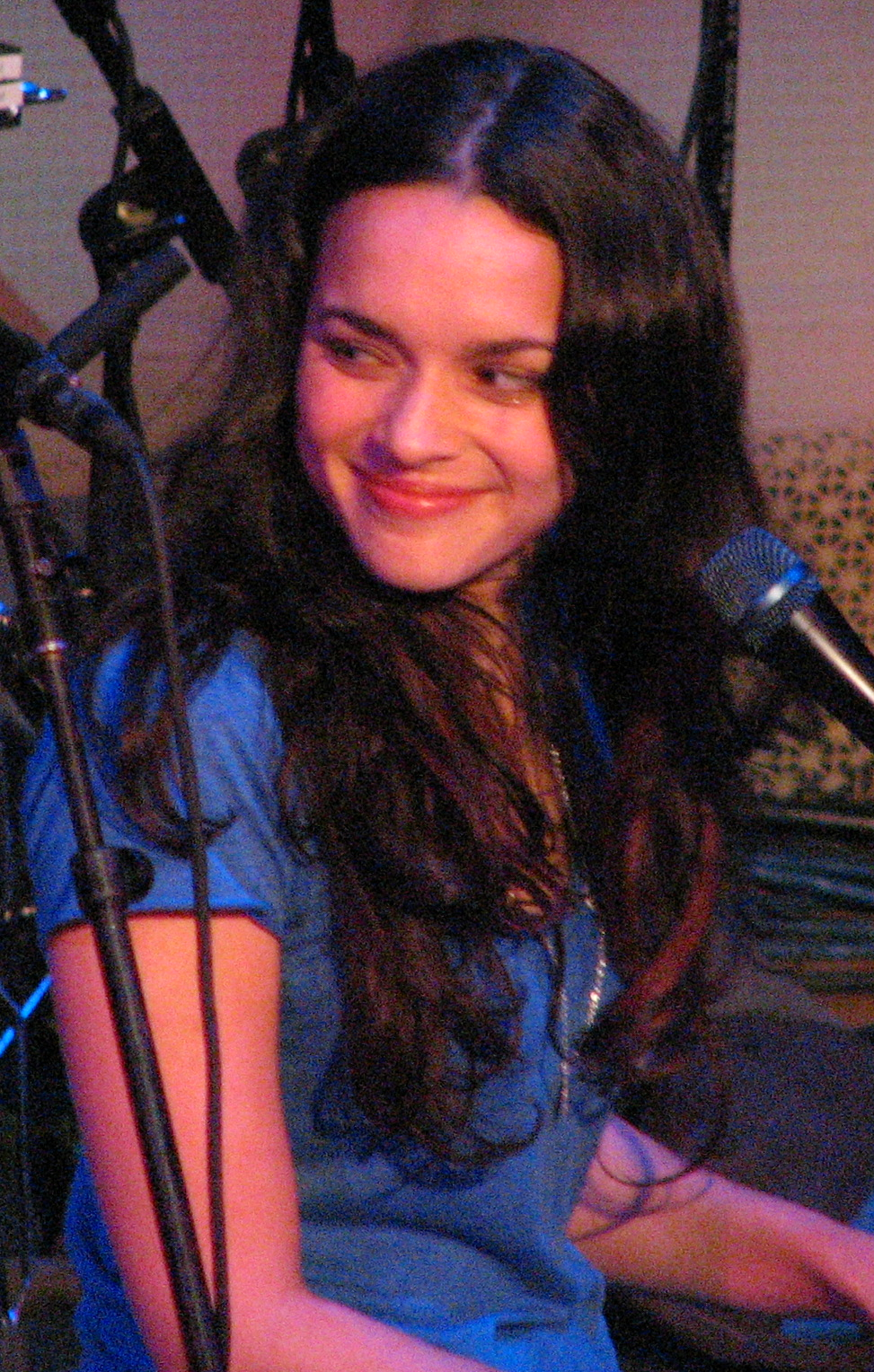
Norah Jones

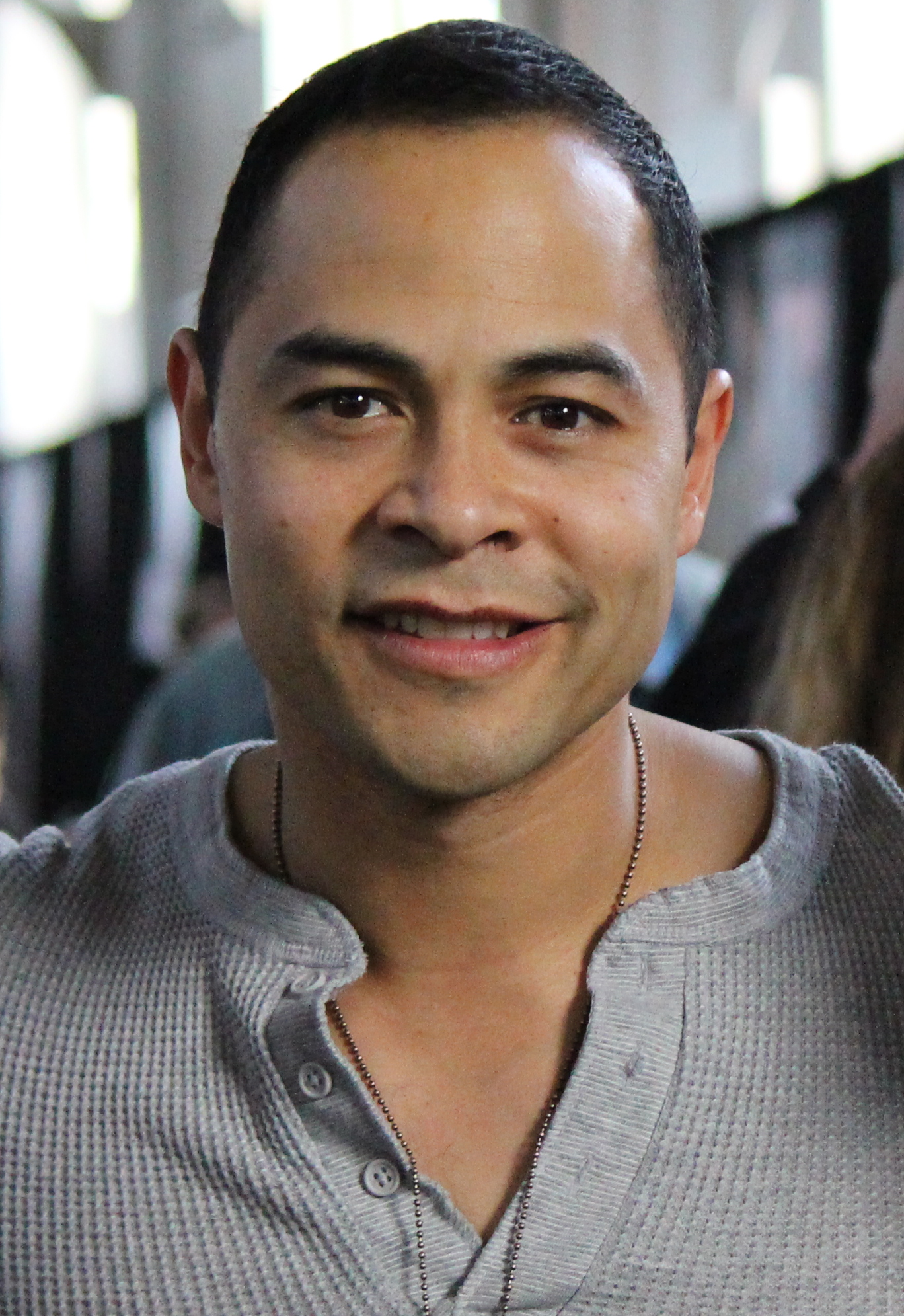
Jose Pablo Cantillo

- March 1
  - Kate Bolz, politician
  - Éowyn, singer-songwriter
- March 5
  - Tonya Cornelisse, actress
  - Riki Lindhome, actress, comedian and musician
- March 6
  - Khalid Abdullah, football player
  - Tim Howard, football player
  - X1, rapper (d. 2007)
- March 7 – Julia DeMato, singer
- March 8
  - Apathy, rapper
  - Geoff Rickly singer/songwriter and frontman for Thursday
- March 9
  - Oscar Isaac, Guatemalan-born actor
  - Melina Perez, wrestler
- March 10
  - Josh Altman, real estate agent, investor, and television personality
  - Edi Gathegi, Kenyan-born actor
  - David Holt, politician, mayor of Oklahoma City, Oklahoma (2018–present)
  - Danny Pudi, actor and comedian
  - Jimmy Williams, football player (d. 2022)
- March 11
  - Alex Aragon, golfer
  - Benji Madden, singer and guitarist for Good Charlotte
  - Joel Madden, singer and frontman for Good Charlotte
  - Justin Wilson, politician, mayor of Alexandria, Virginia
- March 12 – Rhys Coiro, actor
- March 14
  - Dan Avidan, musician/YouTuber
  - Jacques Brautbar, musician and composer
  - James Jordan, actor
  - Chris Klein, actor
  - Lana Lokteff, YouTuber
- March 15
  - Jason Crow, politician
  - Pollyanna McIntosh, Scottish-born actress
  - Kevin Youkilis, baseball player
- March 16
  - Tyler Arnason, ice hockey player
  - Felisha Terrell, actress
- March 17
  - Coco Austin, television personality and actress
  - Stormy Daniels, pornographic actress and director
  - Samoa Joe, wrestler
- March 18
  - Danneel Ackles, actress and model
  - Adam Levine, singer and frontman for Maroon 5
- March 19
  - Abby Brammell, actress
  - Josh Gallion, politician
  - Joe Hursley, actor and musician
- March 20
  - Daniel Cormier, mixed martial artist
  - Molly Jenson, musician
  - Bianca Lawson, actress
- March 21 – Jimenez Lai, architect
- March 22 – Zulay Henao, Colombian-born actress
- March 23
  - Mark Buehrle, baseball player
  - Bryan Fletcher, football player
- March 24 – Adam Andretti, stock car racing driver
- March 25
  - Lee Pace, actor
  - Traxamillion, producer and rapper (d. 2022)
  - Gorilla Zoe, rapper
- March 26 – Kevin Drake, musician
- March 27
  - Mac Schneider, politician
  - Robert Teet, wrestler
- March 28 – Rayshawn Askew, football player
- March 29 – De'Angelo Wilson, actor and rapper
- March 30
  - Norah Jones, musician
  - Jose Pablo Cantillo, actor
- March 31 – Ken Floyd, drummer for Eighteen Visions (1995–2007)

=== April ===
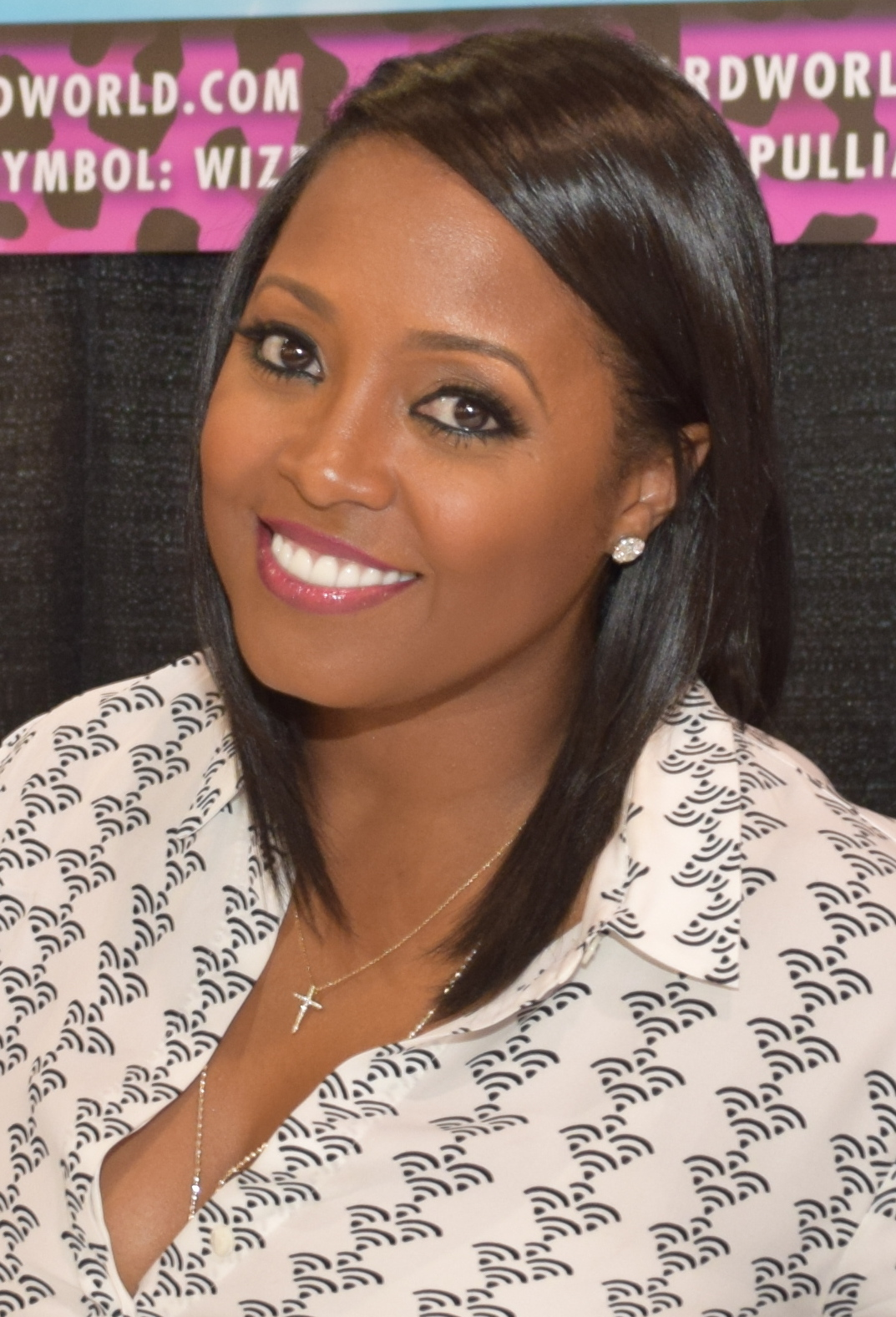
Keshia Knight Pulliam

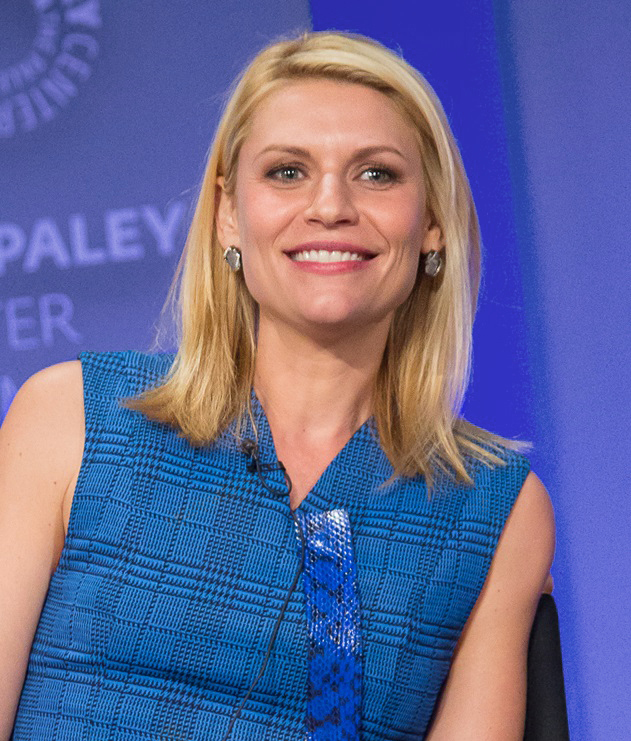
Claire Danes

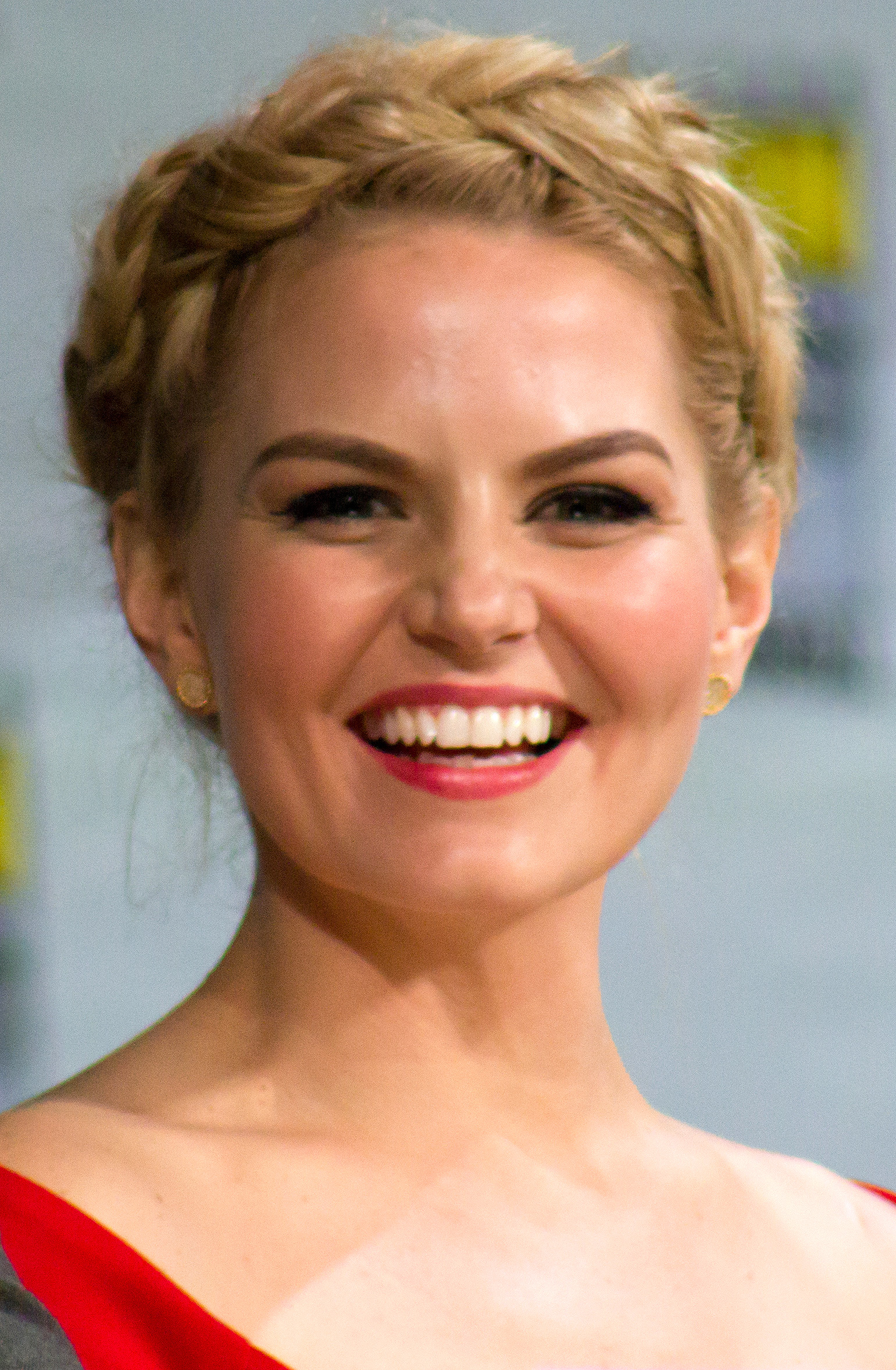
Jennifer Morrison

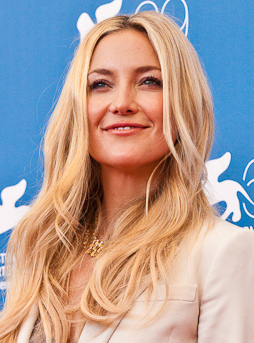
Kate Hudson

- April 2
  - Derick Armstrong, football player
  - Jesse Carmichael, keyboard player for Maroon 5
- April 4 – Natasha Lyonne, actress
- April 6 – Clay Travis, writer, lawyer, radio host, and television analyst
- April 8 – David Petruschin, drag queen
- April 9
  - Keith Nobbs, actor
  - Keshia Knight Pulliam, actress
  - Stephen Brodsky, guitarist
- April 10 – Rachel Corrie, activist and diarist (d. 2003)
- April 11
  - Gillian Murphy, ballerina
  - Josh Server, actor
- April 12
  - Claire Danes, actress
  - Jennifer Morrison, actress
  - Josh Turek, Paralympic wheelchair basketball player and politician
- April 13 – Baron Davis, basketball player
- April 14 – Rebecca DiPietro, model
- April 15 – Anthony Grundy, basketball player (d. 2019)
- April 16 – Rob Laakso, musician, guitarist, singer, record producer, and engineer (d. 2023)
- April 17
  - Jamel Ashley, sprinter
  - Michael Treanor, actor and martial artist
- April 18
  - Michael Bradley, basketball player
  - Kourtney Kardashian, reality television star
  - Frank LaRose, politician
- April 19
  - Chad Anderson, politician
  - Kate Hudson, actress, author and fashion designer
- April 21 – Anwar Robinson, singer
- April 23
  - Jaime King, actress
  - Ryan Sinn, bassist for The Distillers
- April 24
  - Adam Andretti, race car driver
  - Cazzey Louis Cereghino, actor, novelist, stuntman, and singer/songwriter
  - Avey Tare, musician
- April 25
  - Giuseppe Andrews, actor, screenwriter, director, and singer/songwriter
  - Khalid El-Amin, basketball player
- April 26 – Joanne Aluka, basketball player
- April 27 – Travis Meeks, frontman and guitarist for Days of the New
- April 29 – Diego Ayala, tennis player
- April 30
  - Shelley Calene-Black, voice actress
  - Sean Mackin, violinist for Yellowcard

=== May ===
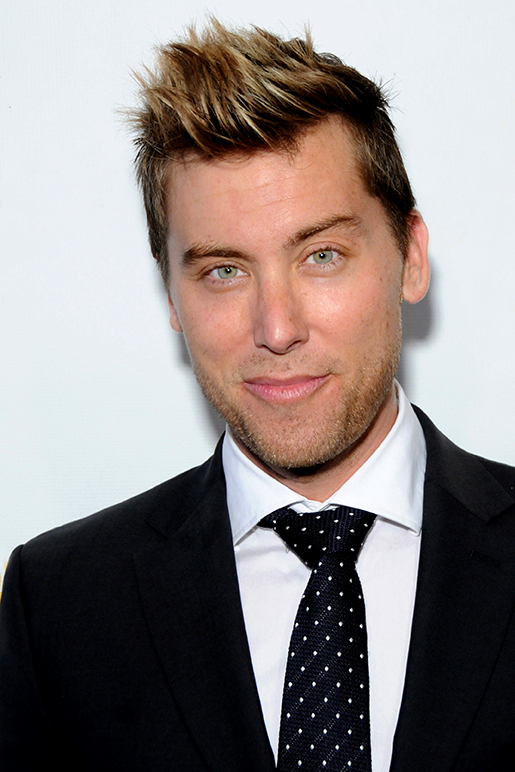
Lance Bass

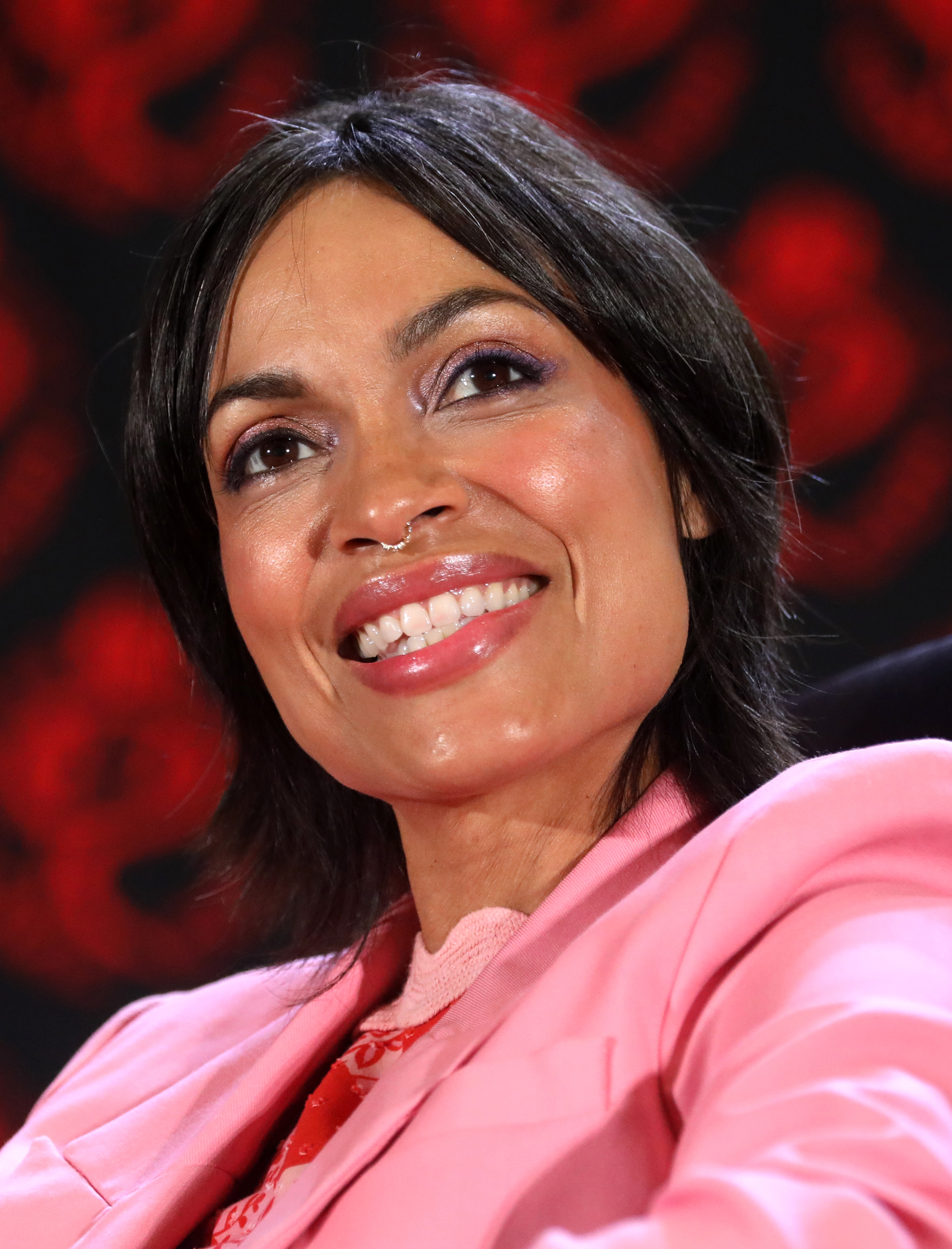
Rosario Dawson

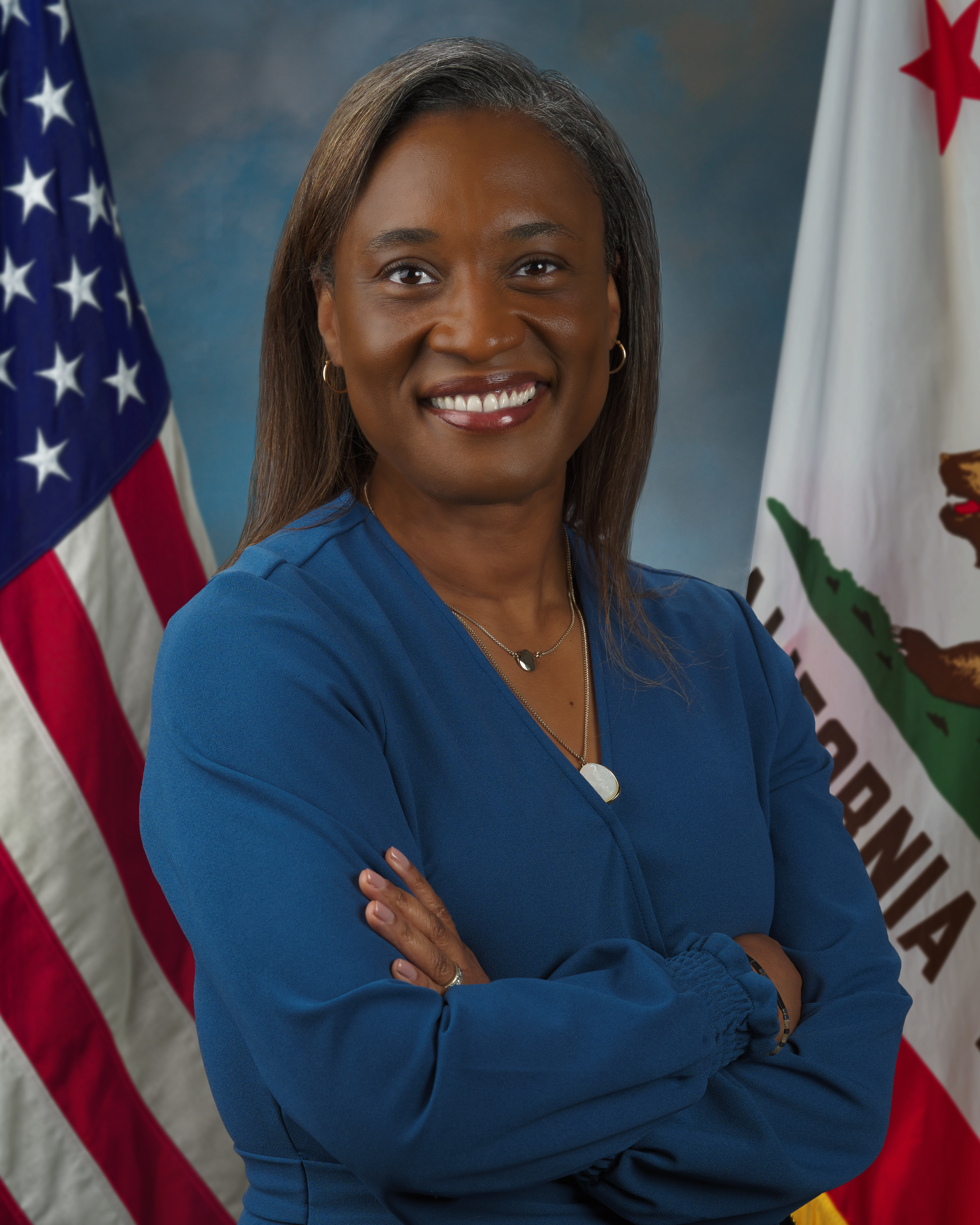
Laphonza Butler

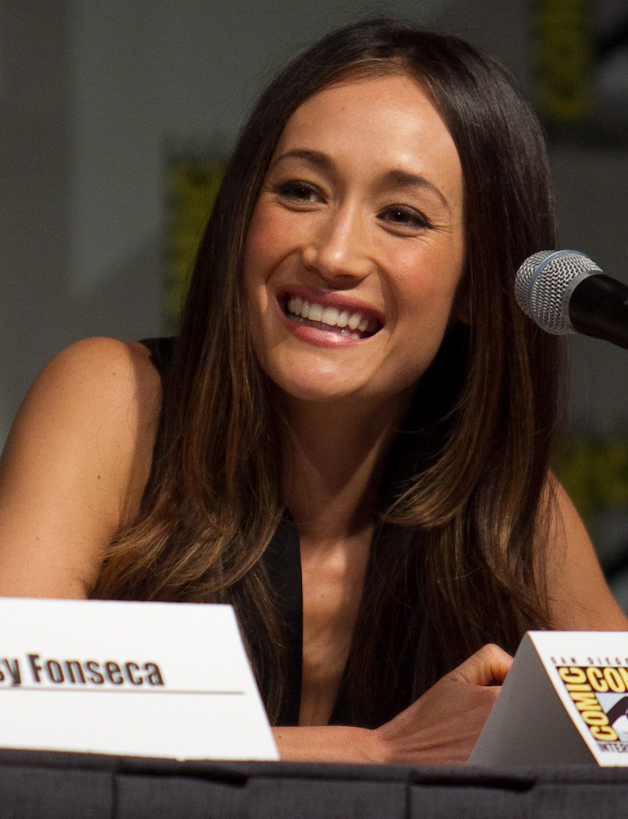
Maggie Q

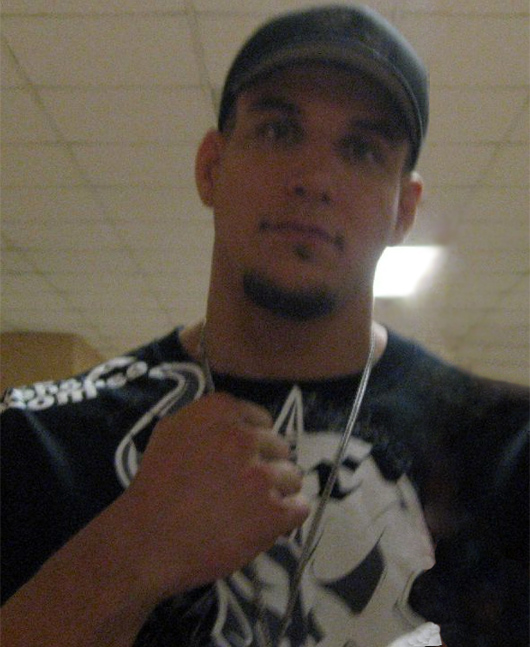
Frank Mir

- May 2 – James Kent, chef (d. 2024)
- May 4
  - Bárbara Almaraz, American-born Mexican soccer player
  - Warren Barfield, Christian singer/songwriter
  - Lance Bass, singer and member of 'N Sync
  - Zach Nunn, politician
- May 5 – Vincent Kartheiser, actor
- May 6 – Mark Burrier, cartoonist
- May 7 – Betsy Rue, actress and model
- May 8 – Rachna Shroff, oncologist (d. 2026)
- May 9
  - Aaron Alexis, spree killer (d. 2013)
  - Erik Bottcher, politician
  - Rosario Dawson, actress, singer, producer, comic book writer and political activist
  - Matt Morris, American singer-songwriter and actor
  - Brandon Webb, American baseball player
  - Andrew W.K., singer-songwriter, producer, and actor
- May 11 – Laphonza Butler, politician and lobbyist, U.S. Senator from California
- May 12
  - Andre Carter, American football player
  - Steve Smith Sr., American football player
  - Aaron Yoo, actor
- May 13 – Mickey Madden, bassist for Maroon 5
- May 14 – Dan Auerbach, singer/songwriter, record producer, and frontman for The Black Keys
- May 16 – Jessica Morris, actress
- May 17 - Ayda Field, American actress
- May 22
  - Maggie Q, actress
  - Nazanin Boniadi, Iranian-born British-American actress
- May 23 – Matt Flynn, drummer for Maroon 5
- May 24
  - Greg Amsinger, sportscaster
  - Frank Mir, mixed martial artist
  - Tracy McGrady, basketball player
  - Adam Peters, football executive
- May 25
  - Corbin Allred, actor
  - Felix G. Arroyo, politician
- May 26
  - Marques Anderson, football player
  - Amanda Bauer, astronomer and academic
  - Elisabeth Harnois, actress
  - Ashley Massaro, wrestler and model (d. 2019)
- May 27 – Michael Buonauro, comic creator
- May 28 – Jesse Bradford, actor
- May 29
  - Richard Lee Jackson, actor and drummer for Enation
  - Brian Kendrick, wrestler
- May 30
  - Brett Anderson, singer and vocalist for The Donnas
  - Clint Bowyer, race car driver

=== June ===
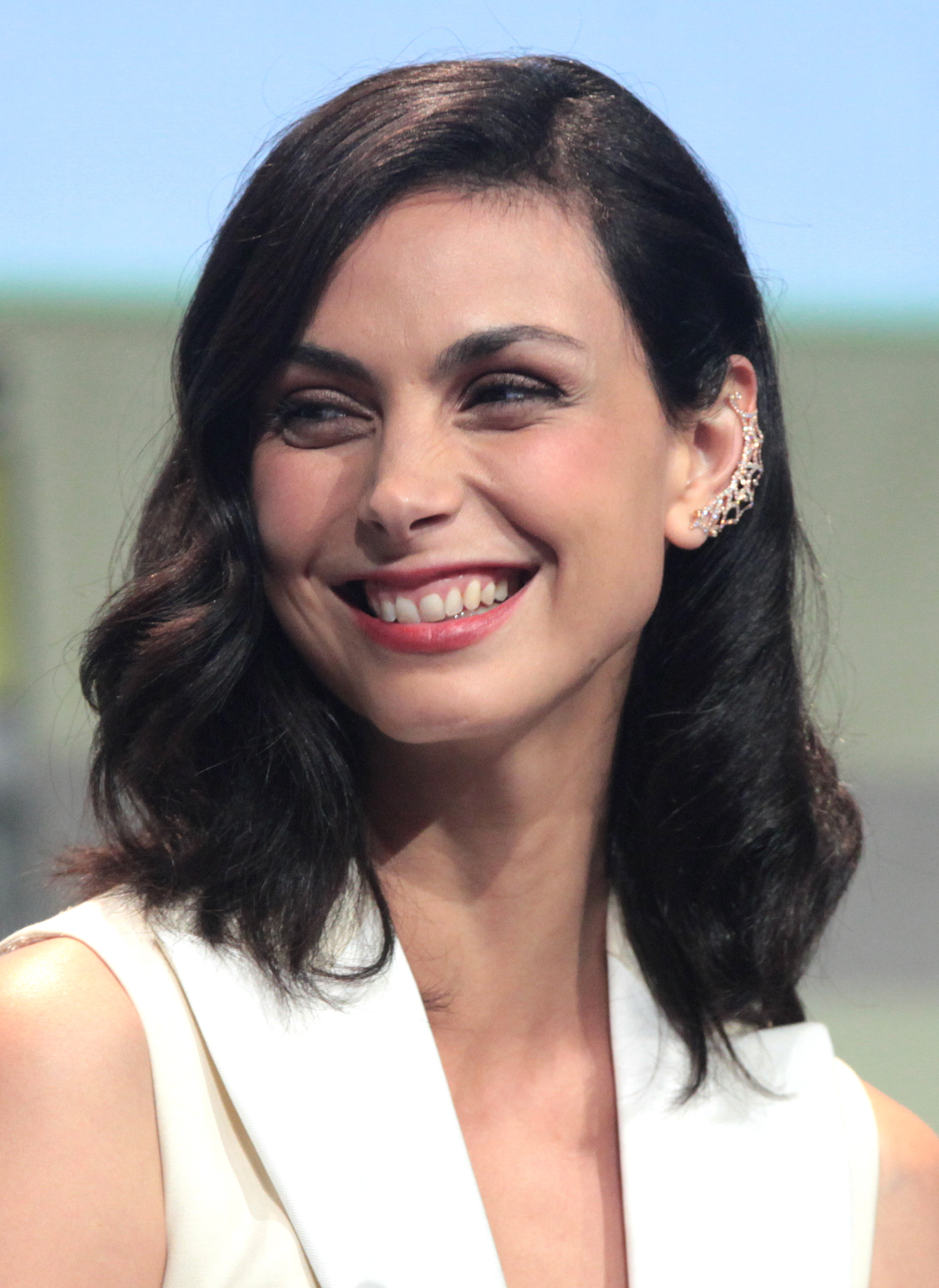
Morena Baccarin

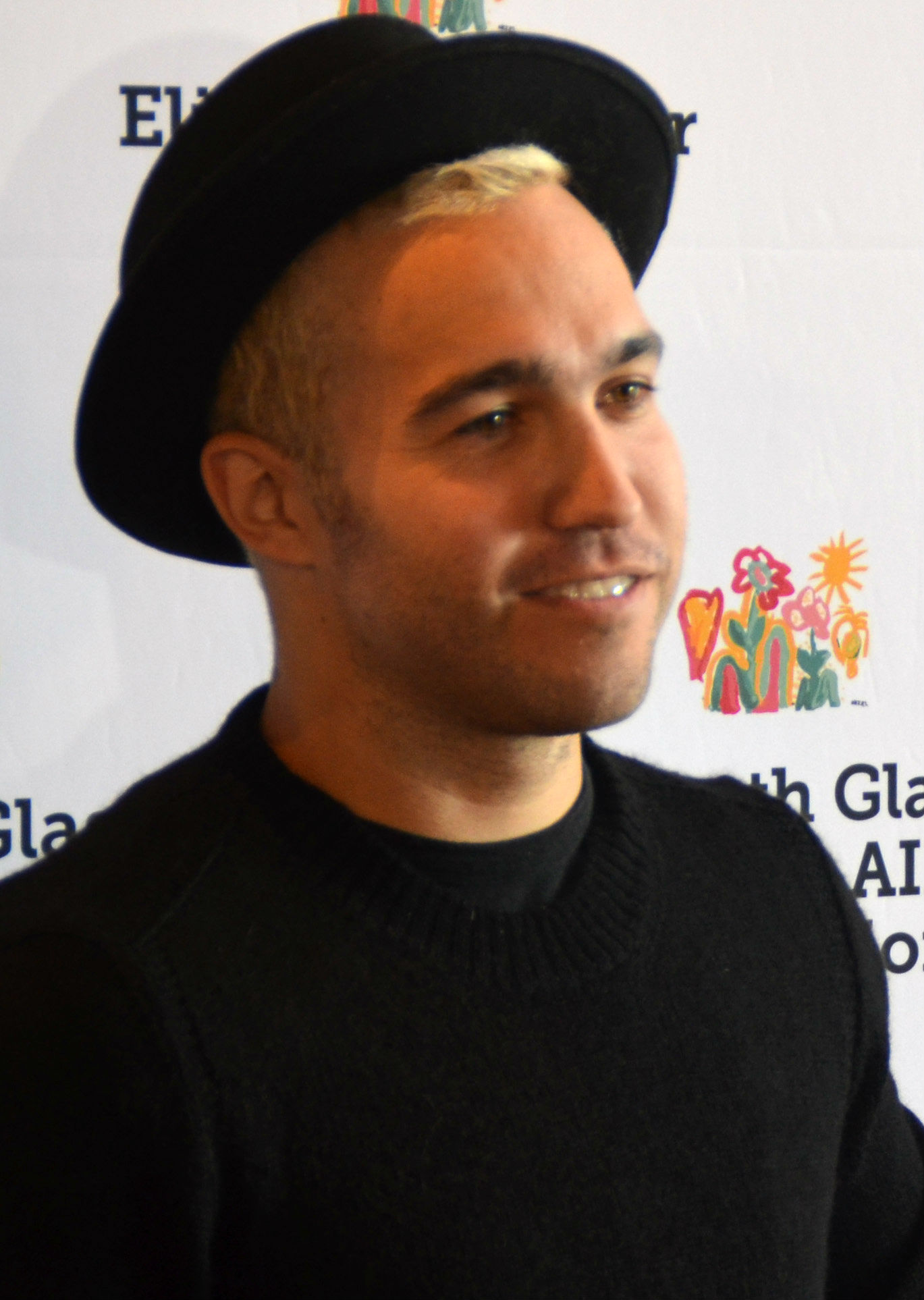
Pete Wentz

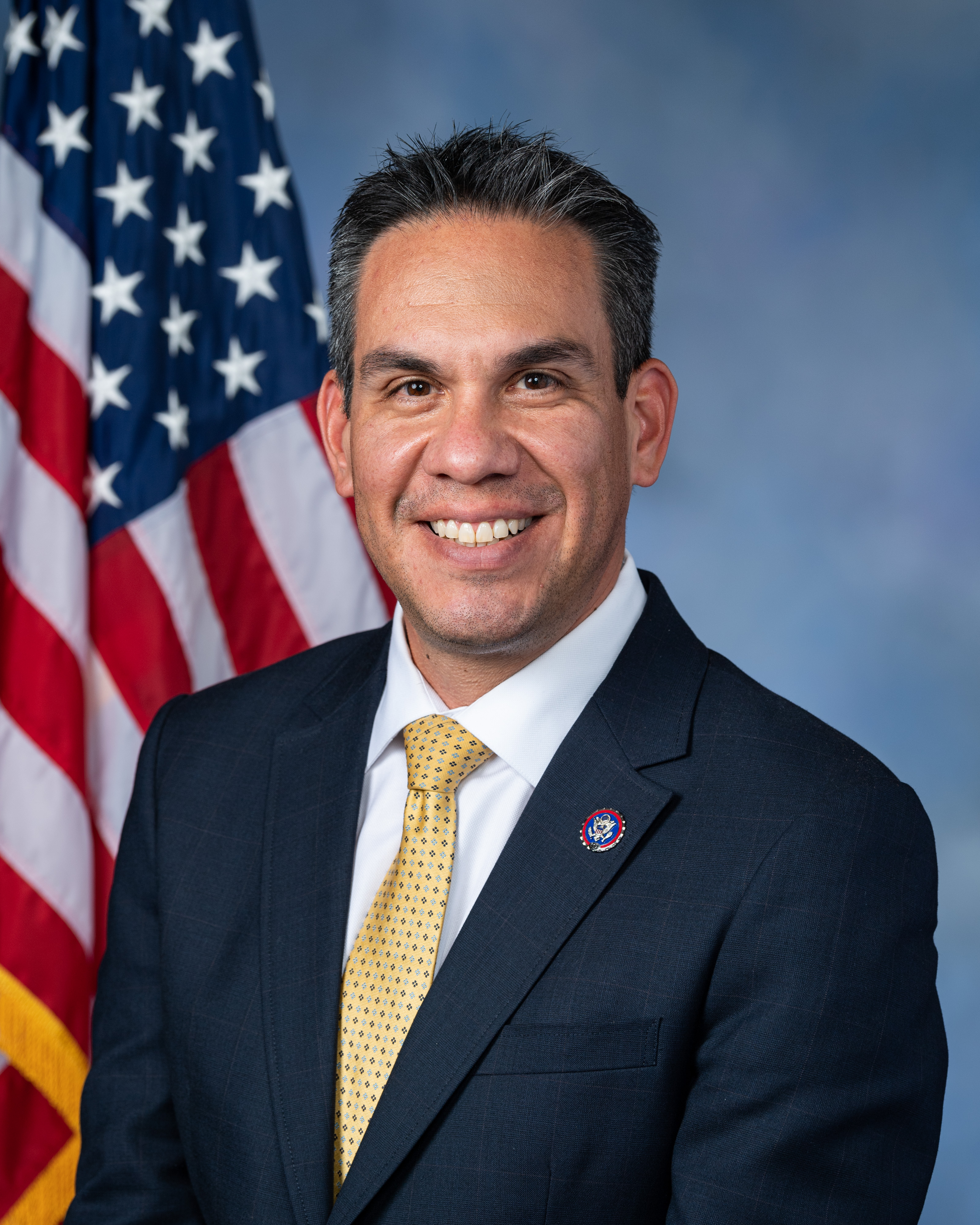
Pete Aguilar

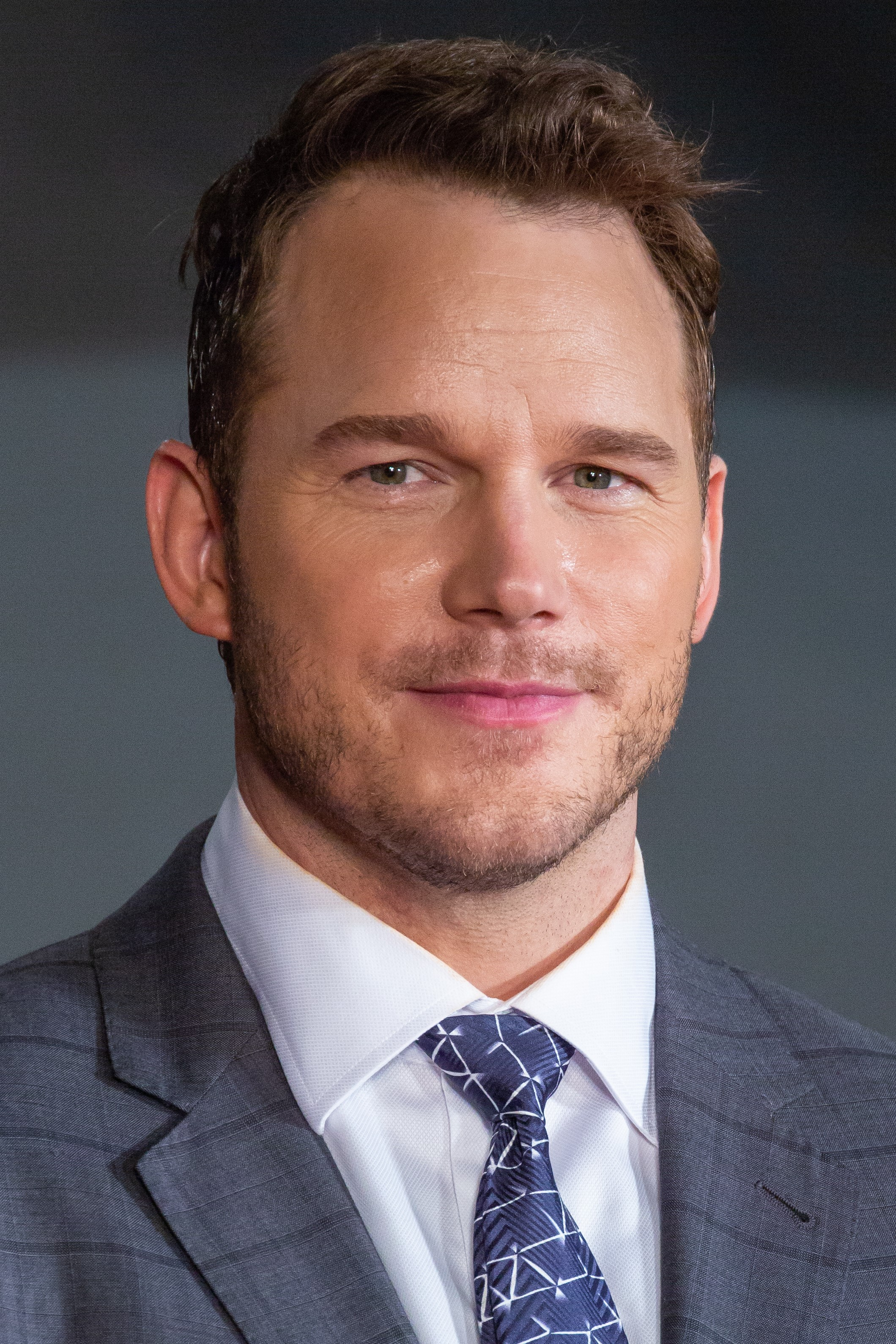
Chris Pratt

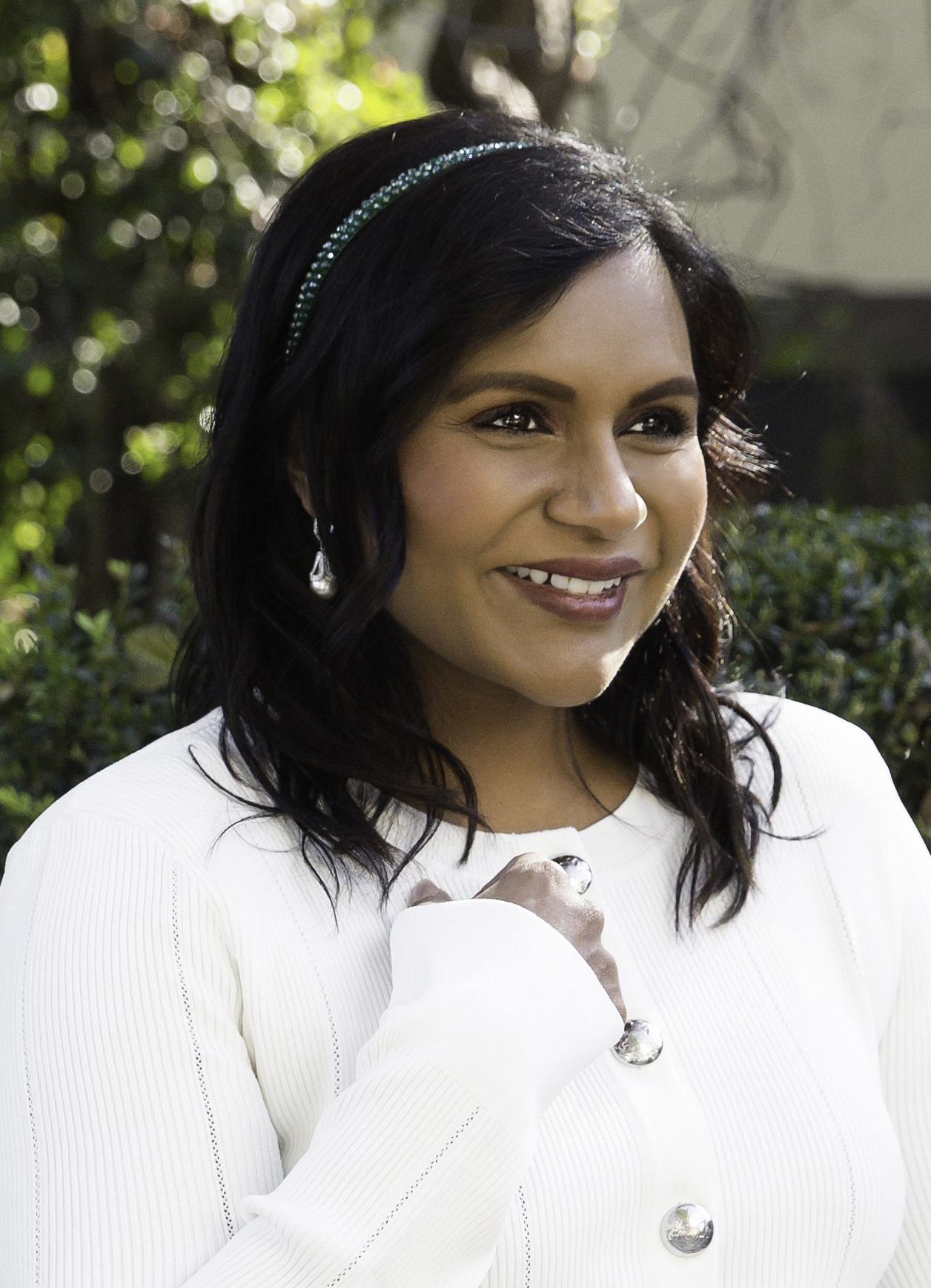
Mindy Kaling

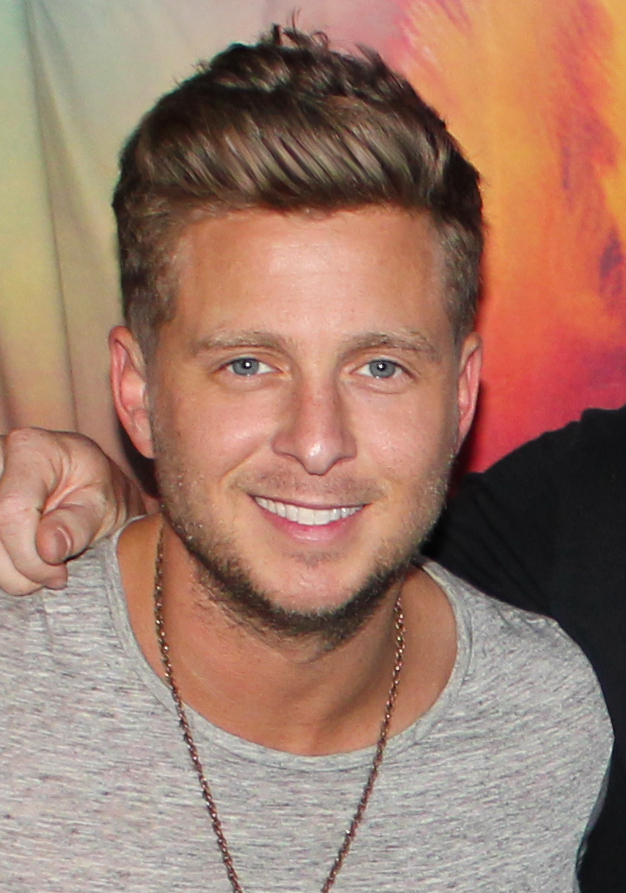
Ryan Tedder

- June 2
  - Imran Awan, Pakistani-born cricketer
  - Morena Baccarin, Brazilian-born actress
  - James Ransone, actor (d. 2025)
- June 4 – Christopher Dorner, serial killer
- June 5
  - Mark Anelli, football player
  - Pete Wentz, musician, lyricist and bassist for Fall Out Boy
- June 6
  - Jeremy Affeldt, baseball player
  - Paul Amorese, drummer
  - Shanda Sharer, murder victim (d. 1992)
- June 8
  - Lauren K. Alleyne, Trinidadian-born poet and writer
  - Rob Holliday, singer/songwriter and bass player
  - Derek Trucks, guitarist and songwriter
- June 9 – Jason Anderson, baseball player
- June 10
  - Lee Brice, country music singer/songwriter
  - Francys Johnson, civil rights attorney, pastor, educator, and political candidate
- June 12 – Dallas Clark, football player
- June 13 – Cory Aldridge, baseball player
- June 14
  - Alton Sterling, victim of police shooting (d. 2016)
  - Roosh V, pickup artist, blogger, MGTOW activist, and writer
- June 16 – Ari Hest, singer/songwriter
- June 17
  - Tyson Apostol, television personality
  - Young Maylay, actor, record producer, and rapper
- June 19
  - Pete Aguilar, politician
  - Josh Brecheen, politician
  - Jade Cole, fashion model
  - Quentin Jammer, football player
- June 21 – Chris Pratt, actor
- June 22
  - Brad Hawpe, baseball player
  - Jai Rodriguez, actor and musician
- June 23
  - Ryan Clark, singer and frontman for Demon Hunter
  - LaDainian Tomlinson, football player
- June 24 – Mindy Kaling, actress, comedian and author
- June 25
  - La La Anthony, television personality and actress
  - Hong Chau, Thai-born Vietnamese American actress
  - Busy Philipps, film actress
- June 26 – Ryan Tedder, singer and frontman for OneRepublic
- June 27
  - Cazwell, rapper and songwriter
  - Lauren Michelle Hill, model and actress
  - Scott Taylor, politician and Navy SEAL
- June 28
  - Felicia Day, actress, writer, director, violinist, and singer
  - Tim McCord, bassist and guitarist for Evanescence and The Revolution Smile (2000–2004)
  - Randy McMichael, football player
- June 30
  - Luke Bronin, politician, mayor of Hartford, Connecticut (2016–present)
  - Rick Gonzalez, actor
  - Faisal Shahzad, Pakistani-born bomber
  - Matisyahu, reggae vocalist, beatboxer, and alternative rock musician

=== July ===
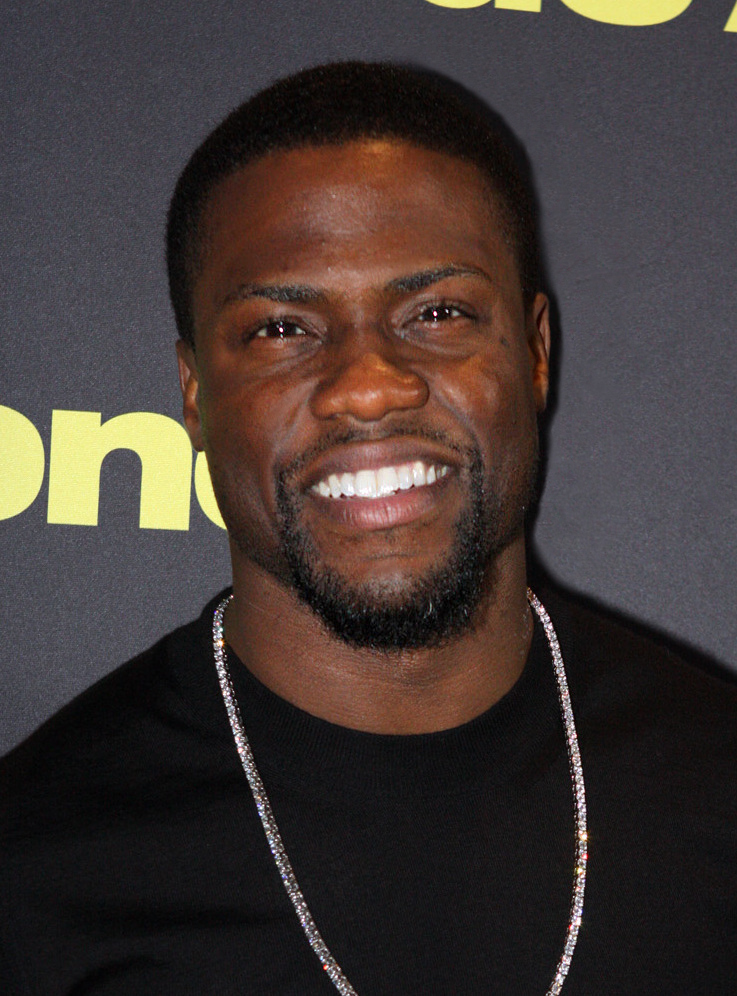
Kevin Hart

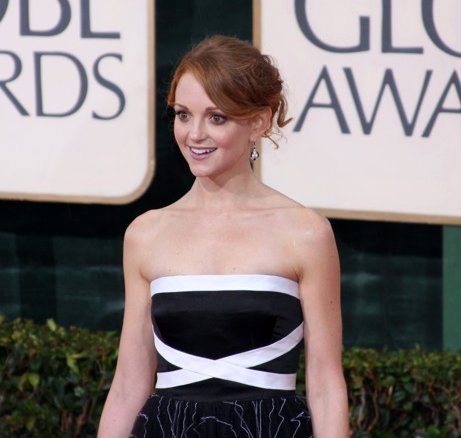
Jayma Mays

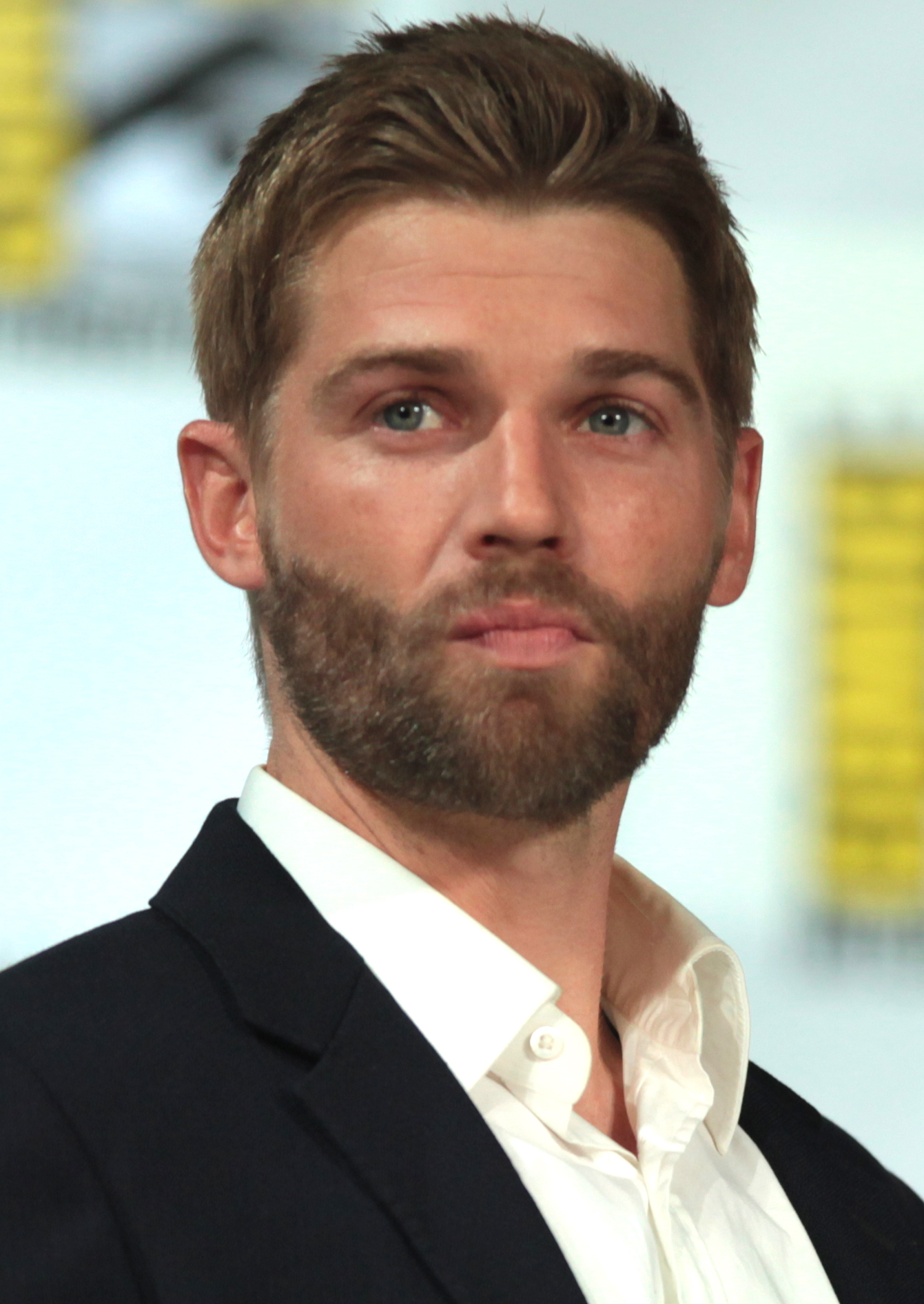
Mike Vogel

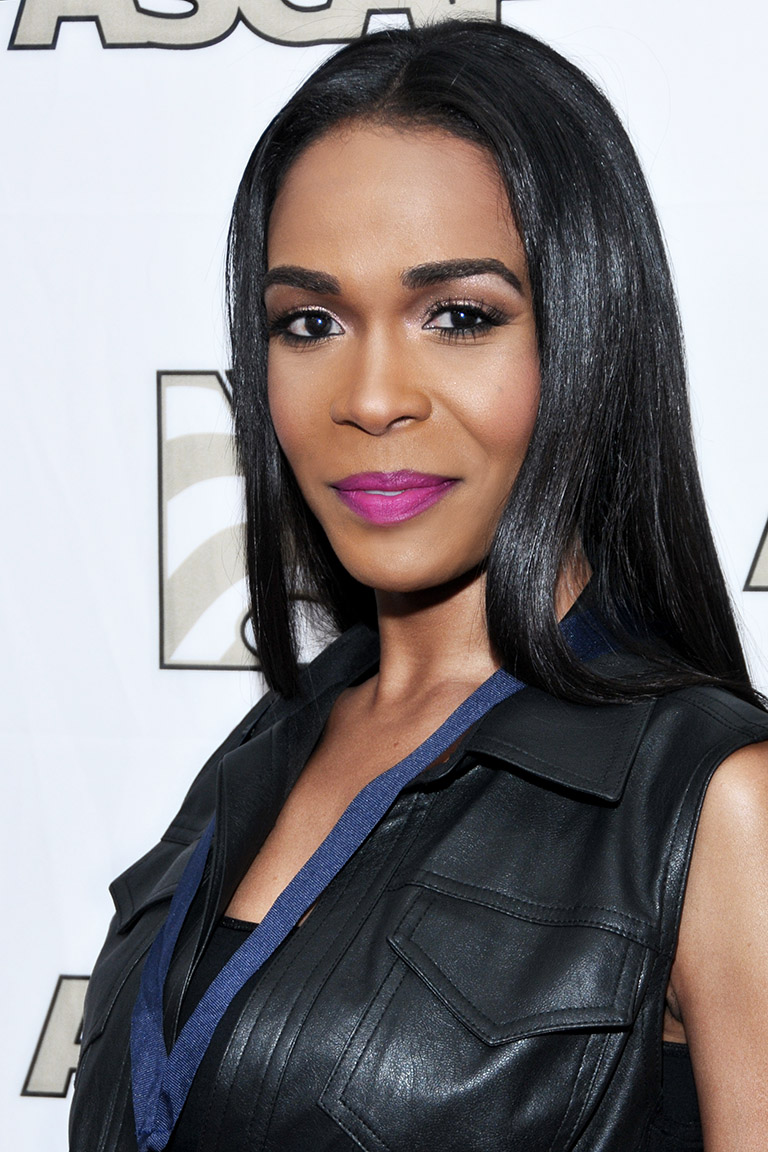
Michelle Williams

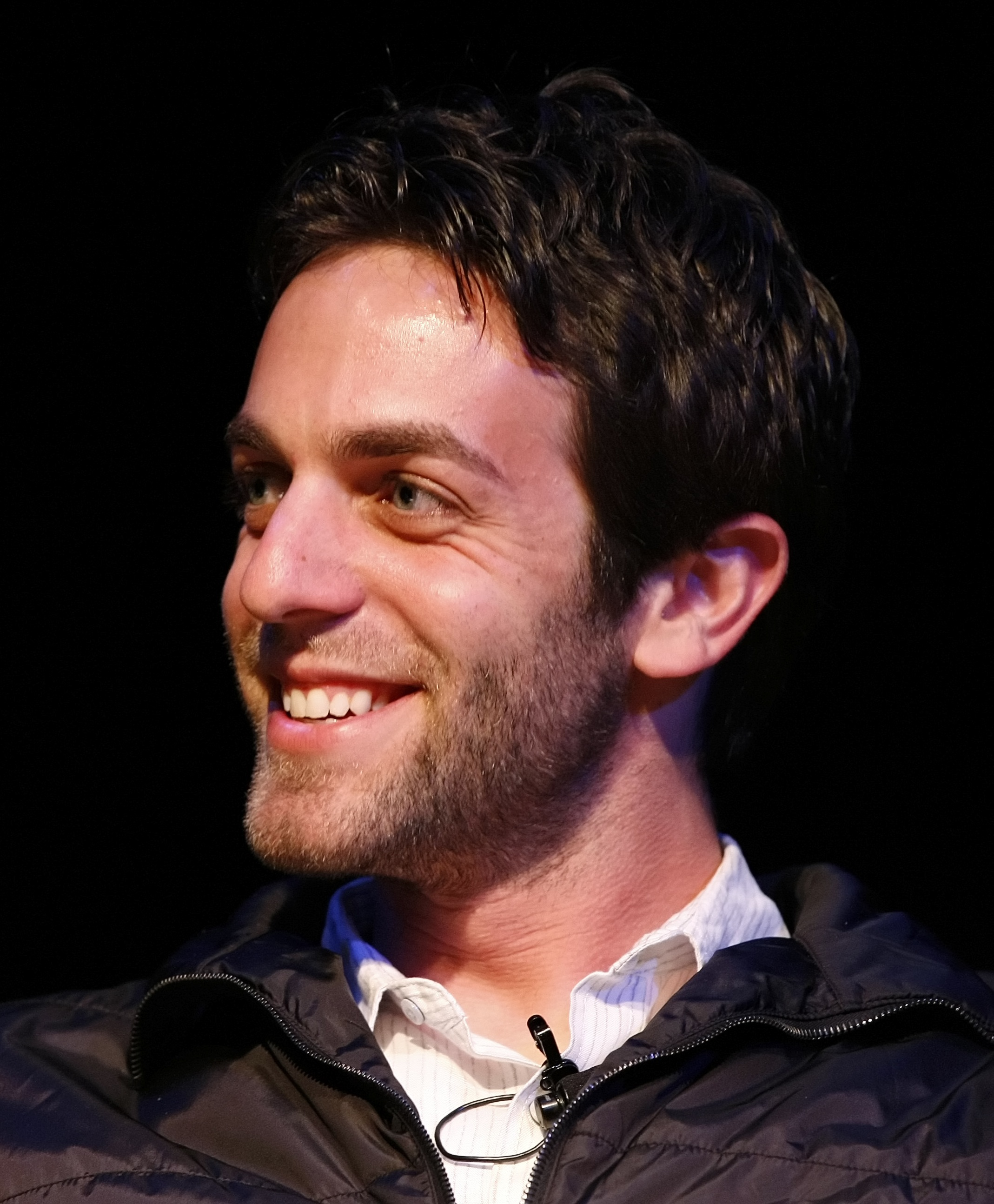
B. J. Novak

- July 1 – Forrest Griffin, mixed martial artist
- July 2
  - Sam Hornish Jr., race car driver
  - Ayiesha Woods, singer
- July 4
  - Kevin Thoms, actor and voice actor
  - Ben Walsh, politician, mayor of Syracuse, New York
- July 6
  - Matthew Barnson, viola player and composer
  - Kevin Hart, American actor, comedian, writer and producer
- July 7
  - Robert Atkins, comic artist
  - Pat Barry, kickboxer and mixed martial artist
  - Tricia Brock, Christian singer/songwriter, lead vocalist for Superchick
- July 8 – Ben Jelen, Scottish-born singer/songwriter
- July 12
  - Ryan Anderson, baseball player
  - Otis Anthony II, politician
  - Omid Abtahi, Iranian-born actor
  - Justin Rockefeller, venture capitalist and political activist
- July 14 – Scott Porter, actor and singer
- July 15
  - Laura Benanti, actress and singer
  - Philipp Karner, actor, writer and director
- July 16
  - Jim Banks, politician
  - Jayma Mays, actress and singer
  - Kim Rhode, Olympic double trap and skeet shooter
- July 17
  - Damien Anderson, football player
  - Brendan James, piano-based singer/songwriter
  - Mike Vogel, actor
- July 18
  - Rick Baxter, politician
  - Jason Weaver, actor and singer
- July 19 – Rick Ankiel, baseball player
- July 21
  - David Carr, football player
  - Mike McGuire, politician
- July 22 – Parvesh Cheena, actor
- July 23
  - Michelle Williams, singer and actress
  - Peter Rosenberg, radio and WWE personality
- July 24
  - Jerrod Niemann, country singer/songwriter
  - Stat Quo, rapper
- July 26
  - Tamyra Gray, singer
  - Mageina Tovah, actress
- July 27 – Shannon Moore, wrestler
- July 29 – James Lynch, musician, guitarist, and vocalist for Dropkick Murphys
- July 30 – Joseph Afful, Ghanaian-born soccer player
- July 31 – B. J. Novak, actor, director, and producer

=== August ===
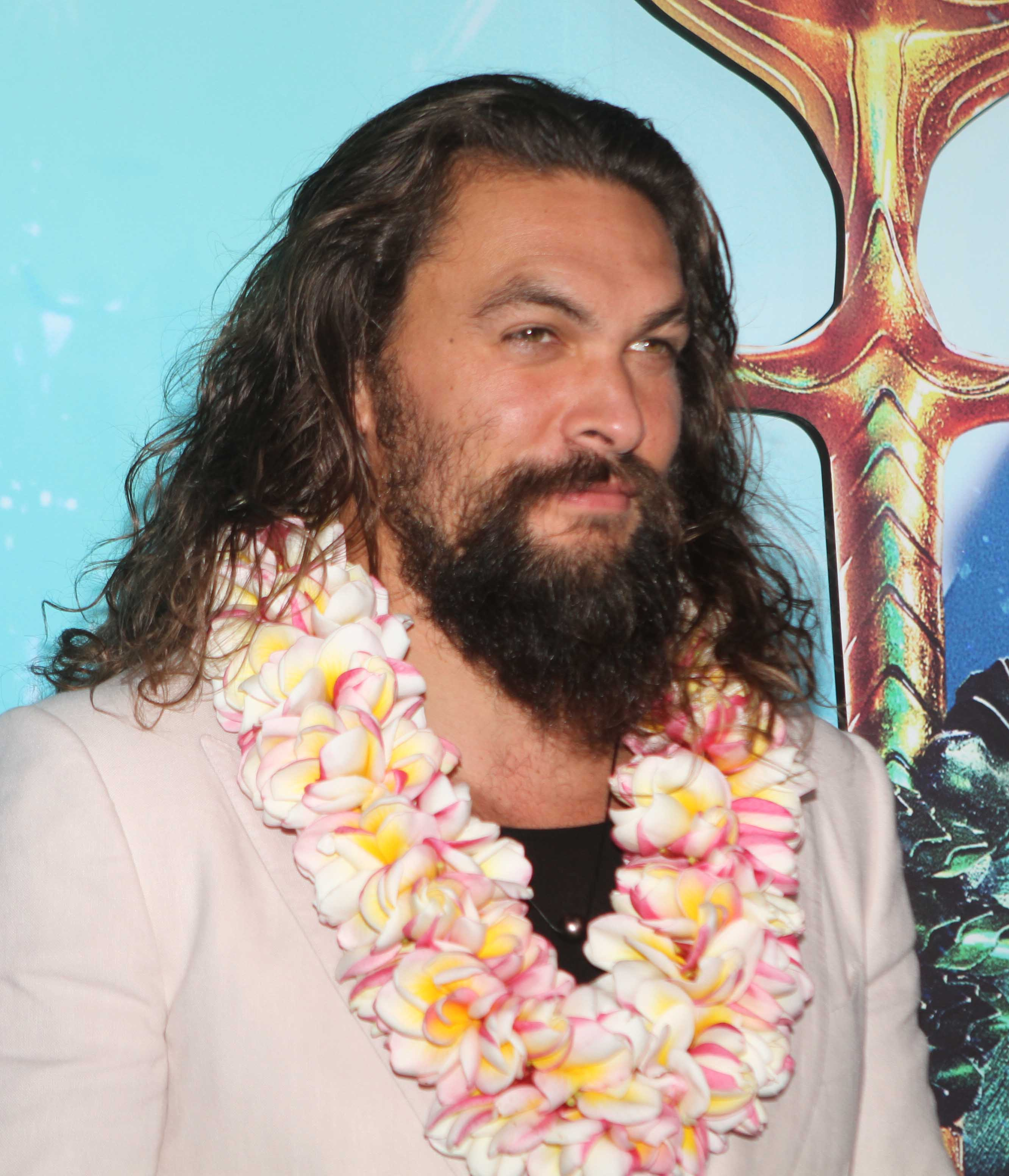
Jason Momoa

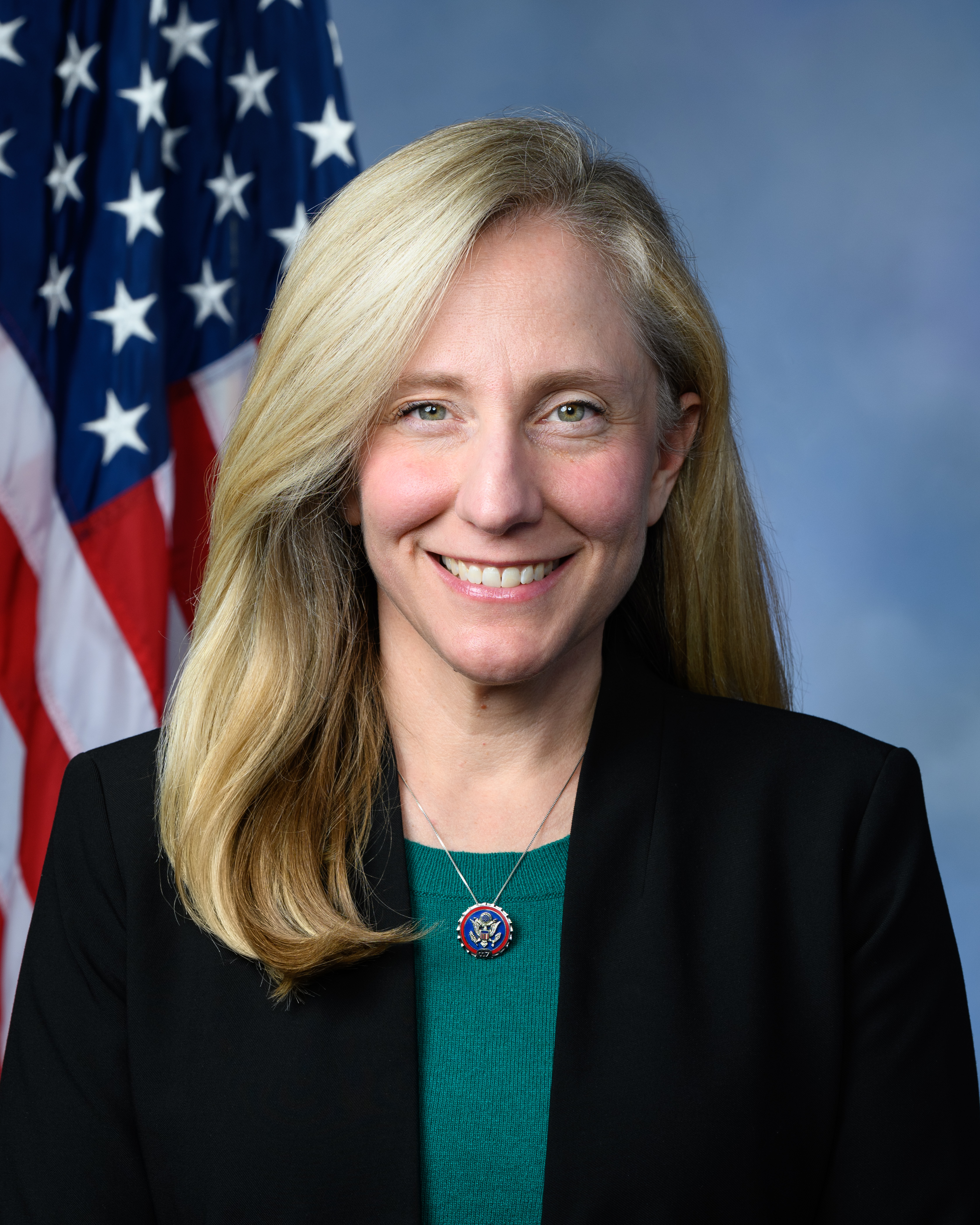
Abigail Spanberger

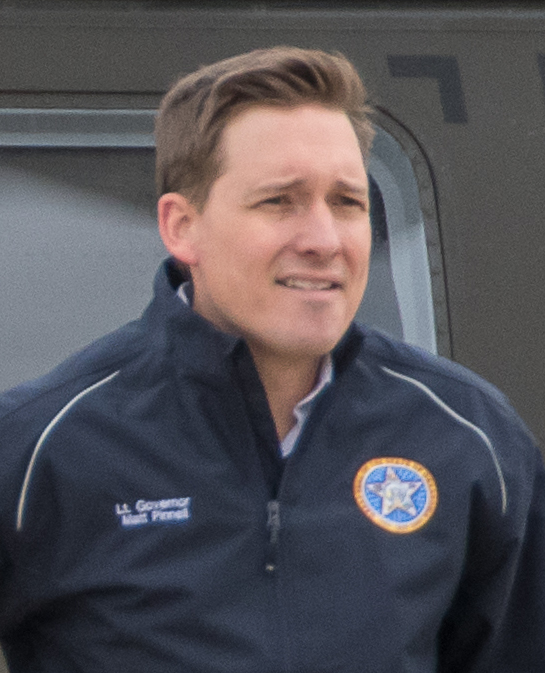
Matt Pinnell

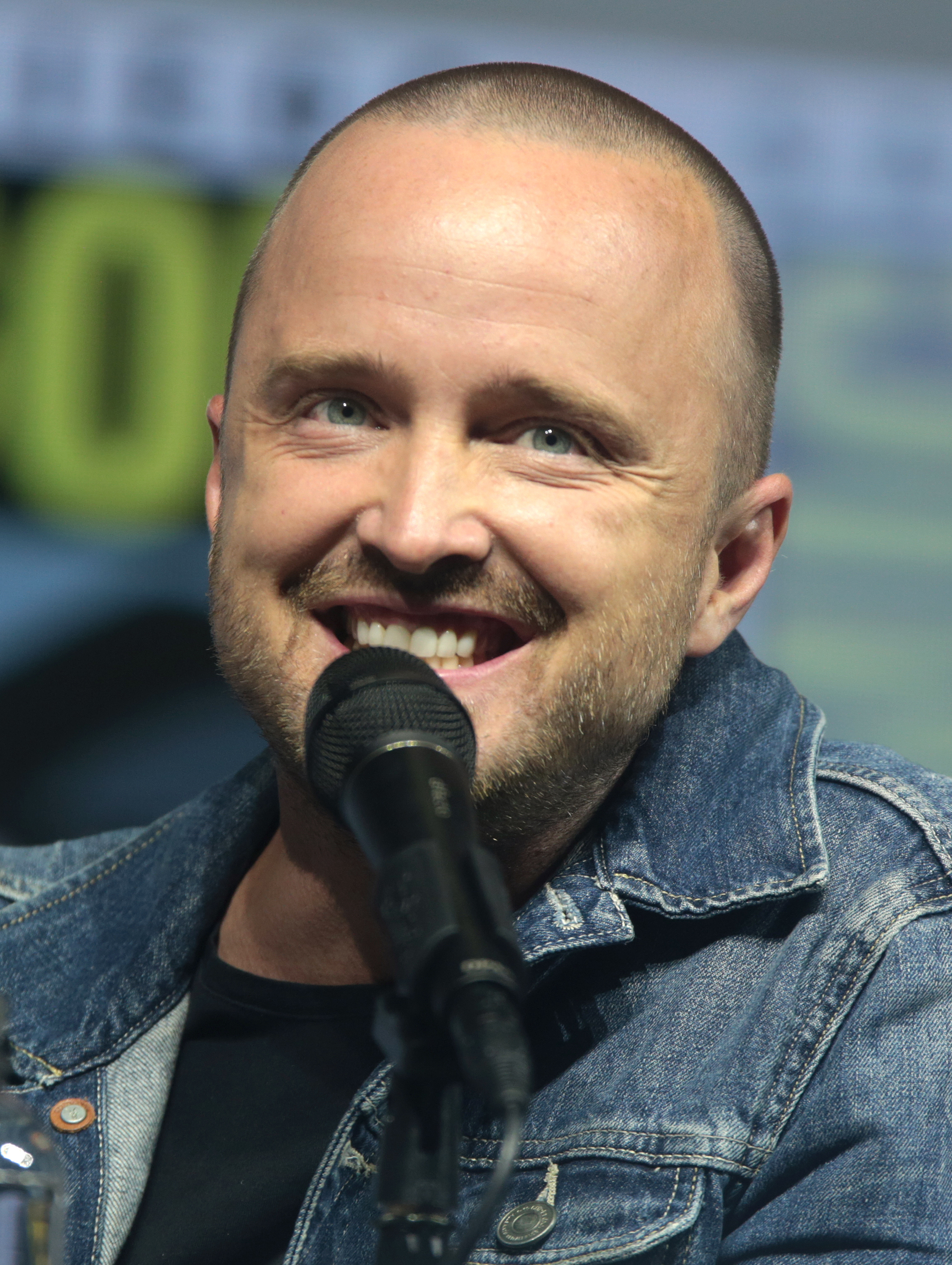
Aaron Paul

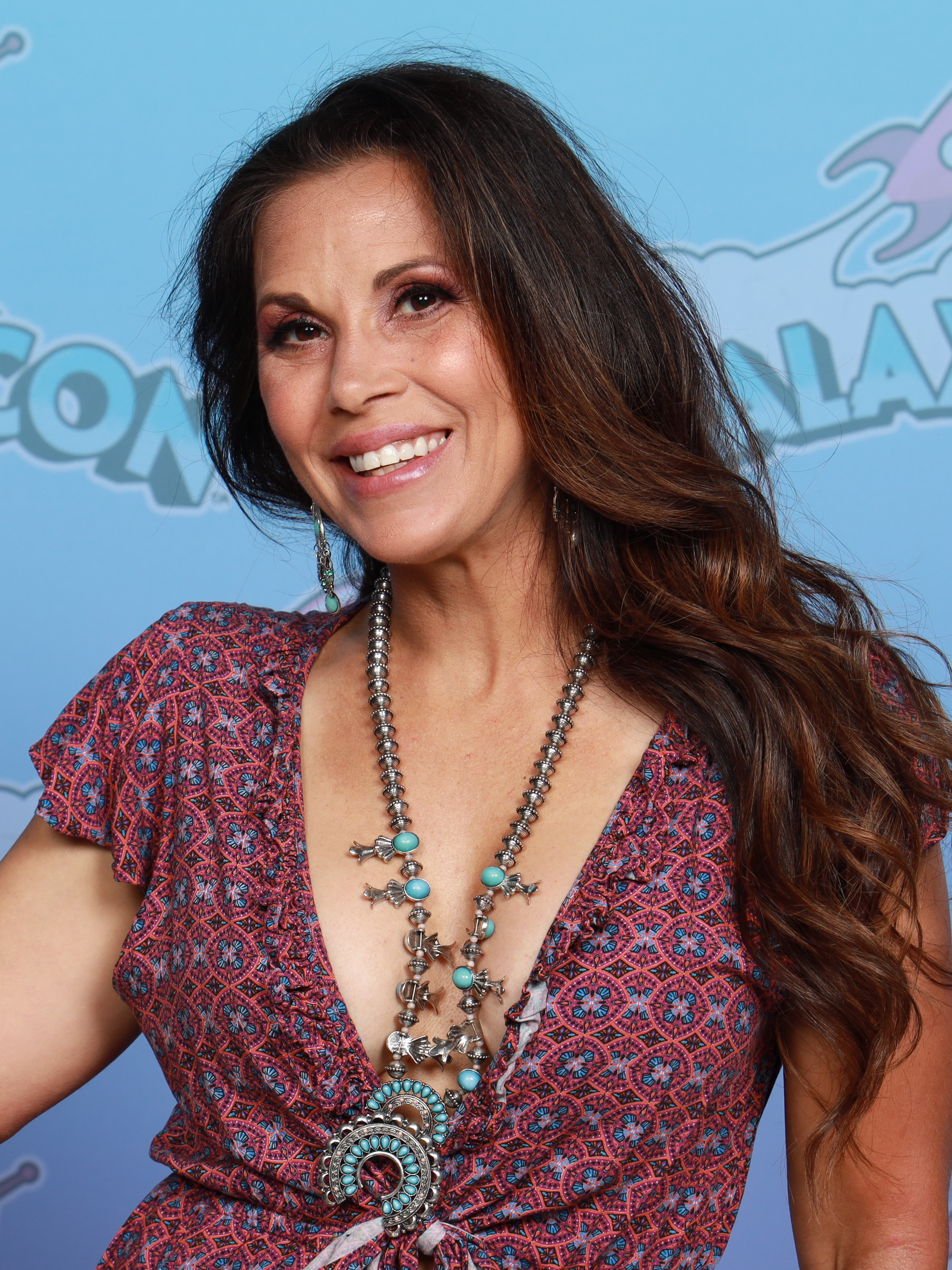
Mickie James

- August 1
  - Romie Adanza, Muay Thai kickboxer
  - Jason Momoa, actor
- August 4 – Edward Byers, Navy SEAL and Medal of Honor recipient
- August 7
  - Omar Bah, Gambian-born psychologist, author, journalist, refugee, and global survivor
  - Gangsta Boo, rapper for Three 6 Mafia (d. 2023)
  - Abigail Spanberger, politician, Governor of Virginia (2026-present)
- August 8 – William Avery, basketball player
- August 10
  - JoAnna Garcia, actress
  - Ted Geoghegan, screenwriter
  - Ryan Hoyt, convicted murderer
  - Kongo Kong, wrestler
- August 11 – Bubba Crosby, baseball player
- August 12 – Peter Browngardt, cartoonist
- August 15
  - Carl Edwards, race car driver
  - Jeff Hurd, politician
  - Matt Pinnell, politician, 17th Lieutenant Governor of Oklahoma
  - Nice Peter, comedian, musician, rapper, and YouTuber
- August 16 – Kevin Turen, producer (d. 2023)
- August 19
  - Jen Adams, lacrosse player and coach
  - Dave Douglas, singer/songwriter and drummer
- August 21 – Kelis, singer/songwriter and chef
- August 22
  - Brandon Adams, actor
  - Matt Walters, football player
- August 24
  - Kaki King, guitarist and composer
  - Michael Redd, basketball player
- August 25
  - Curtis Allgier, white supremacist and convicted murderer
  - Andrew Hussie, artist
- August 26
  - Erik Apple, mixed martial artist
  - James Hart, singer and frontman for Eighteen Visions
  - Jamal Lewis, football player
- August 27
  - Giovanni Capitello, filmmaker and actor
  - Aaron Paul, actor
  - Jon Siebels, guitarist for Eve 6
- August 28 – Shane Van Dyke, actor
- August 29 – Nick Freitas, politician
- August 31 – Mickie James, wrestler

=== September ===
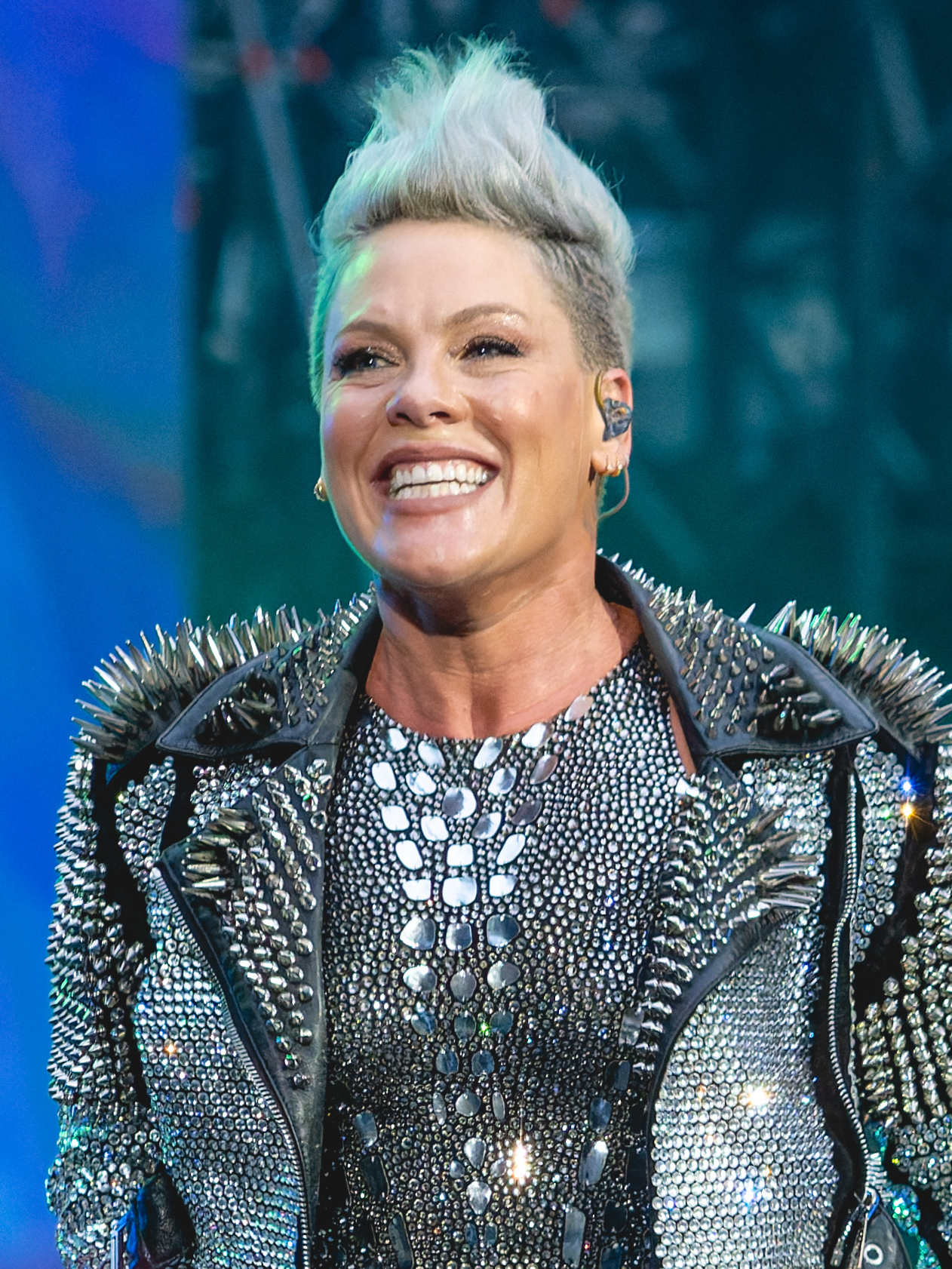
Pink

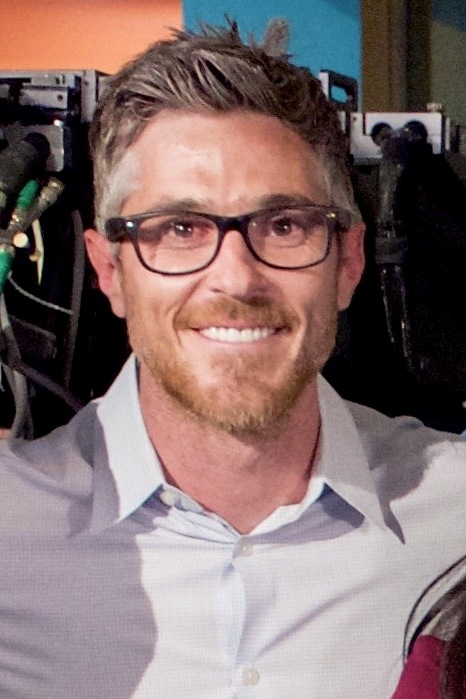
Dave Annable

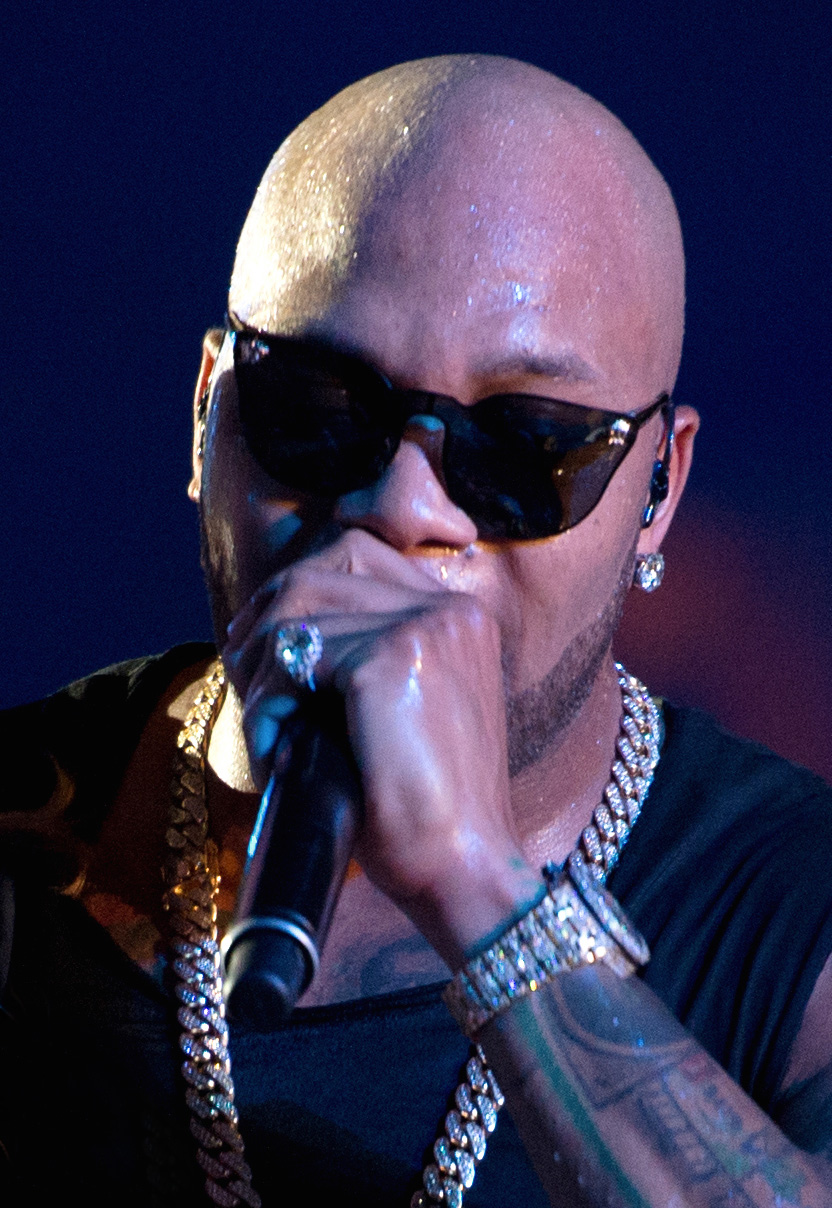
Flo Rida

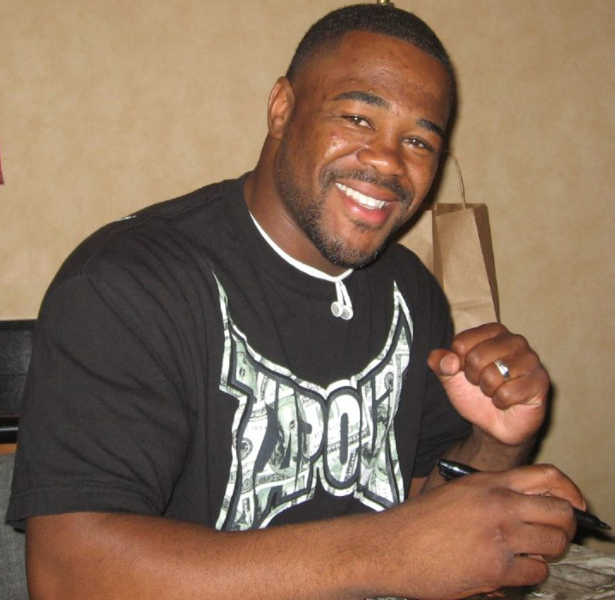
Rashad Evans

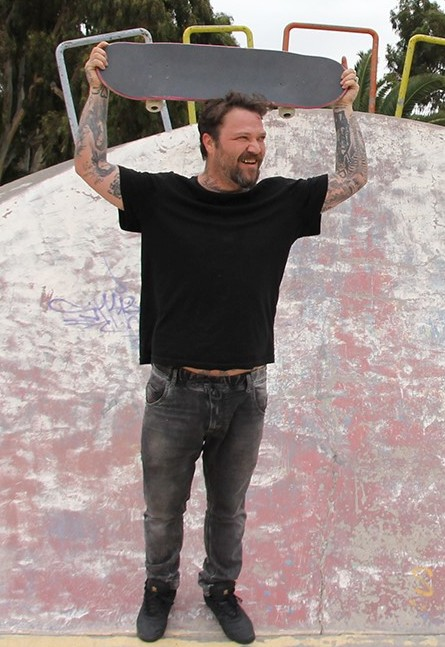
Bam Margera

- September 3 – Tomo Miličević, Bosnian-born guitarist for 30 Seconds to Mars (2003–2018)
- September 4
  - Max Greenfield, actor
  - Granger Smith, country singer/songwriter and minister
- September 6 – Brandon Silvestry, wrestler
- September 8 – Pink, singer
- September 11
  - Nathan Gale, murderer (d. 2004)
  - Steve Hofstetter, comedian, journalist, and author
  - Ariana Richards, actress
  - Cameron Richardson, actress and model
- September 12
  - Michelle Dorrance, tap dancer
  - Jay McGraw, author, son of TV psychologist Dr. Phil McGraw
- September 13 – Jamel Holley, politician
- September 15
  - Dave Annable, actor
  - Amy Davidson, actress
- September 16 – Flo Rida, rapper
- September 17
  - Akin Ayodele, football player
  - Shaun King, activist
  - Billy Miller, actor (d. 2023)
- September 18
  - Jason Armstead, football player
  - Alison Lohman, actress
  - Amna Nawaz, journalist
- September 20 – Ryan Fleck, filmmaker
- September 21
  - Bradford Anderson, actor
  - Mark Burns, evangelical minister, televangelist, conspiracy theorist, and political candidate
- September 22
  - Emilie Autumn, singer/songwriter, poet, author, and violinist
  - Swin Cash, basketball player
  - Peggy Flanagan, politician, 50th Lieutenant Governor of Minnesota
- September 24
  - Justin Bruening, actor and model
  - Erin Chambers, actress
  - Ross Matthews, television host and personality
  - Ted Jan Roberts, actor, stuntman, martial artist, and producer (d. 2022)
- September 25 – Rashad Evans, mixed martial artist
- September 26
  - Christina Nolan, politician
- September 28
  - Bam Margera, skateboarder, actor, and reality star
  - Anndi McAfee, actress and voice actress
- September 30
  - Mike Damus, actor
  - Steve Klein, songwriter and guitarist for New Found Glory (1997–2014)

=== October ===
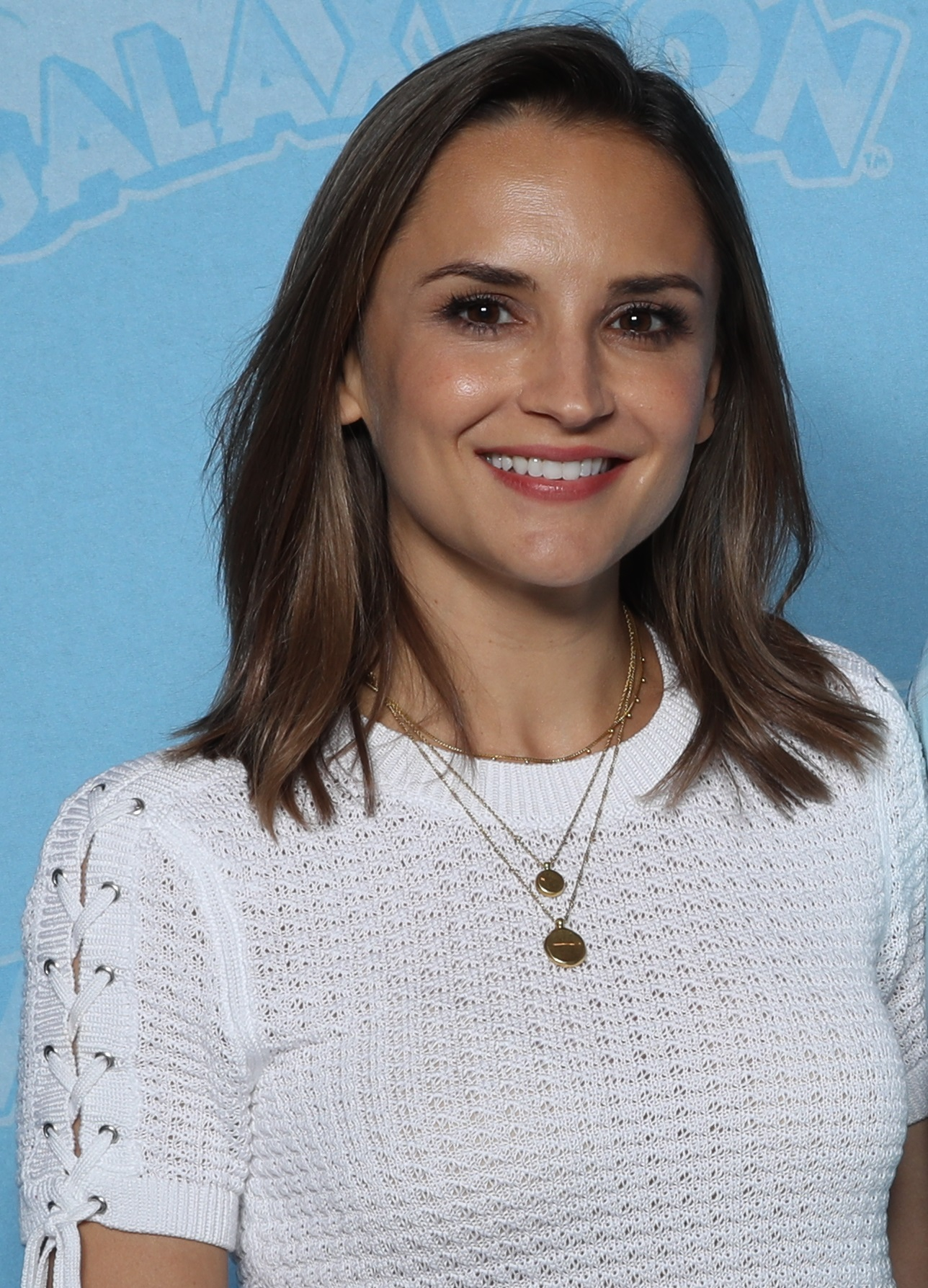
Rachael Leigh Cook

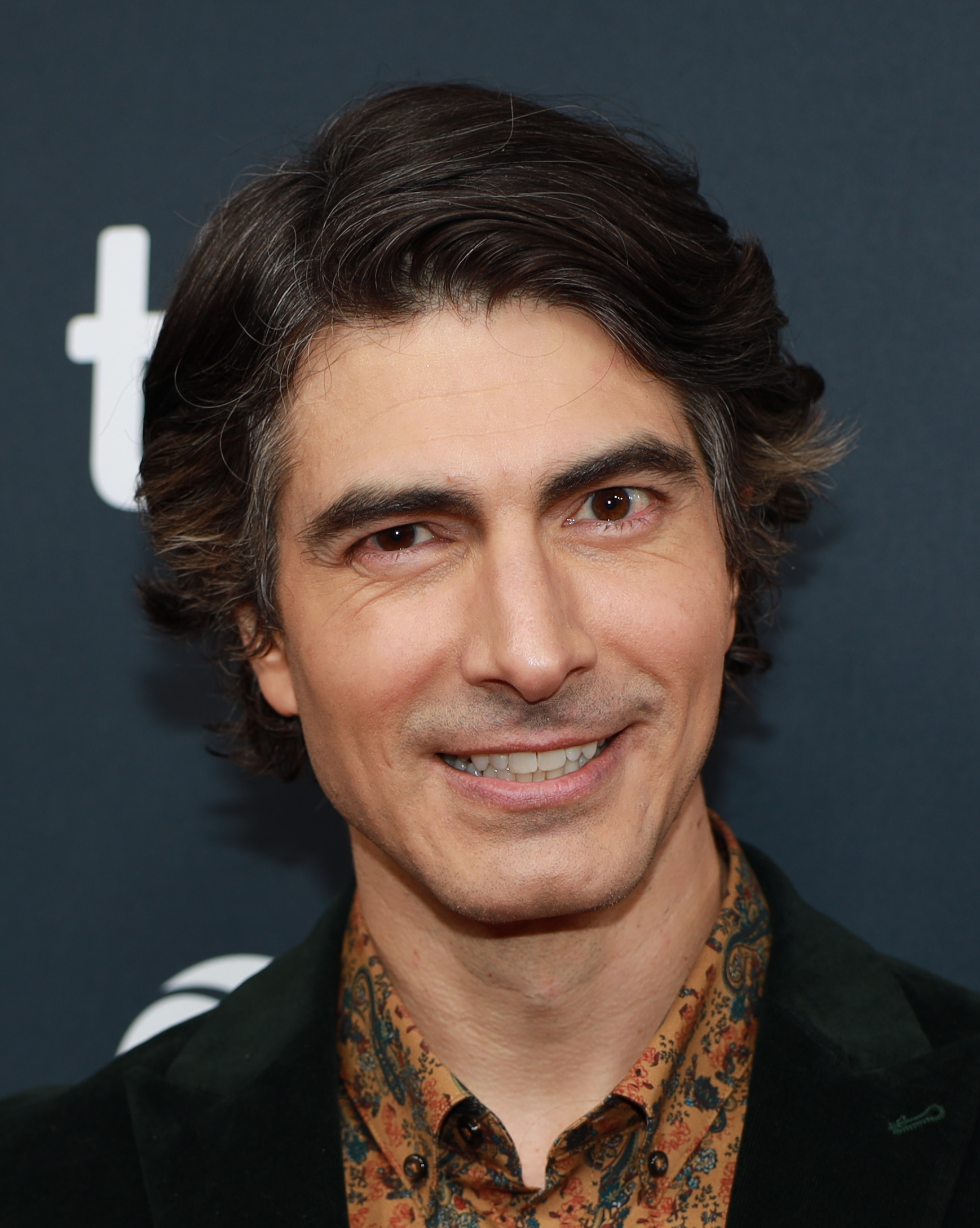
Brandon Routh

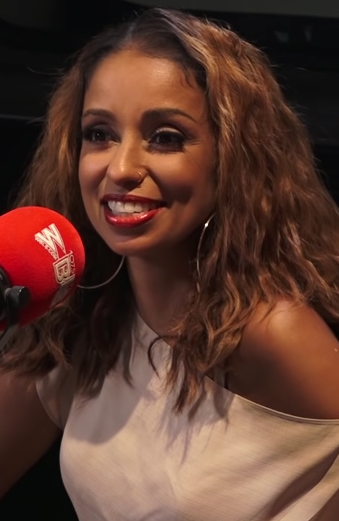
Mýa

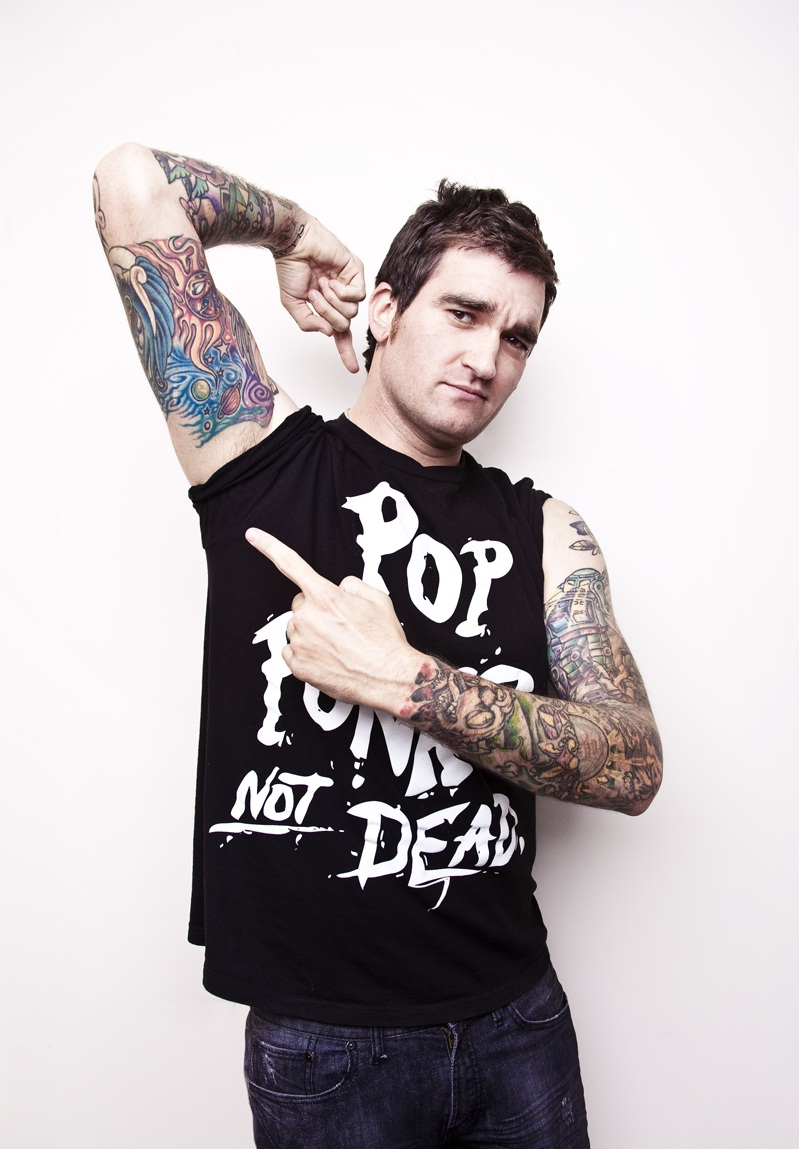
Jordan Pundik

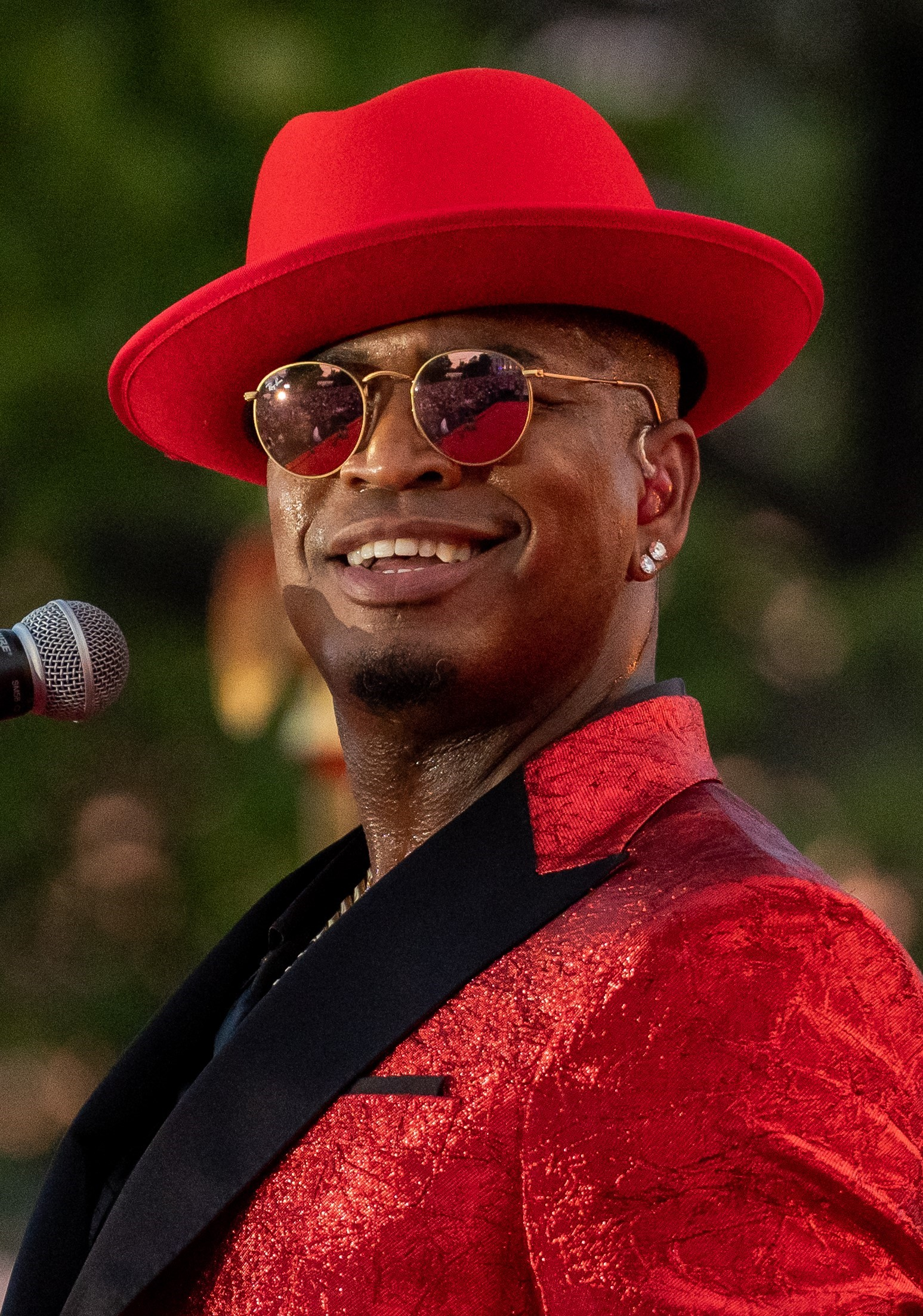
Ne-Yo

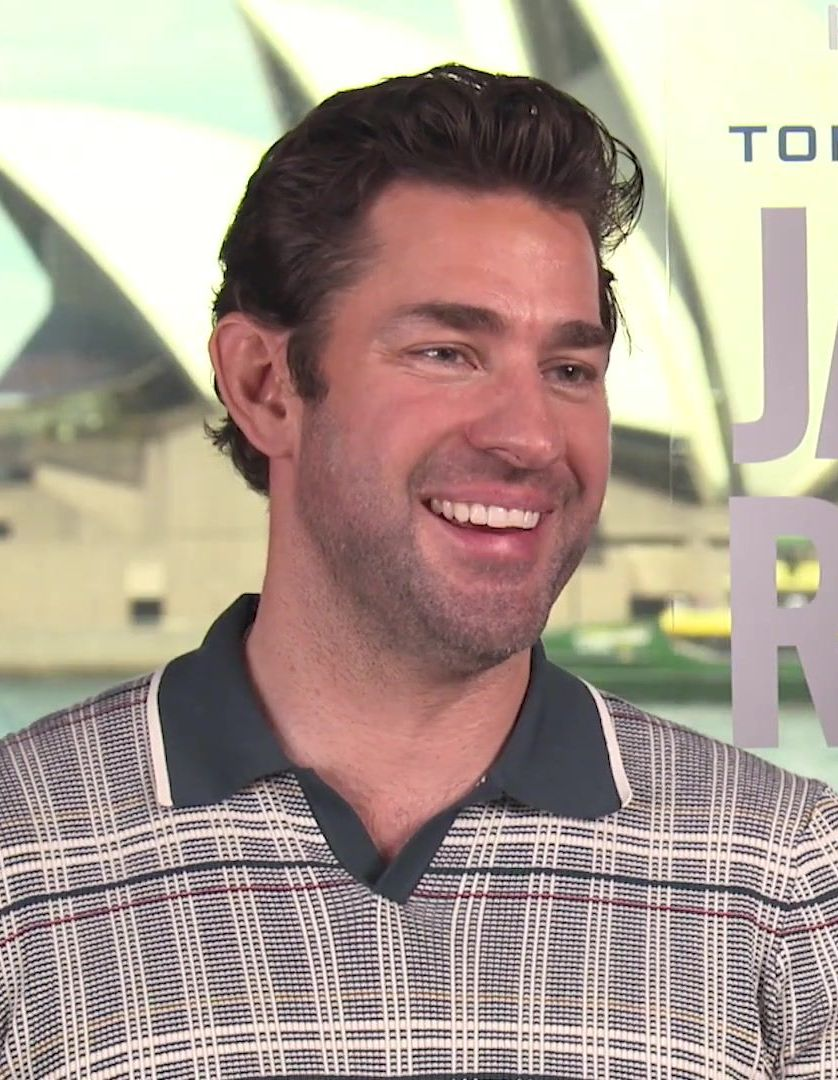
John Krasinski

- October 1
  - Curtis Axel, wrestler
  - Rudi Johnson, football player (d. 2025)
- October 2 – Brianna Brown, actress
- October 3
  - Matt Davis, comedian
  - Josh Klinghoffer, musician and guitarist for Red Hot Chili Peppers
  - John Hennigan, wrestler
- October 4
  - Brandon Barash, actor
  - Rachael Leigh Cook, actress
- October 5 – Matthew Gergely, politician (d. 2025)
- October 8
  - Eric Genrich, politician, mayor of Green Bay, Wisconsin (2019–present)
  - Kristanna Loken, actress and model
- October 9
  - Vernon Fox, football player
  - Alex Greenwald, producer, actor, and singer/songwriter for Phantom Planet and JJAMZ
  - DJ Rashad, electronic musician, producer, and DJ (d. 2014)
  - Brandon Routh, actor
  - Alay Soler, baseball player
- October 10 – Mýa, singer and actress
- October 11 – Gabe Saporta, Uruguayan-born singer, frontman for Cobra Starship (2016–2015) and Midtown
- October 12 – Jordan Pundik, singer/songwriter and frontman for New Found Glory
- October 13 – Shawn Milke, musician, guitarist, keyboardist, and co-frontman for Alesana
- October 14 – Stacy Keibler, wrestler, actress, and model
- October 15
  - Blue Adams, football player
  - Stephanie Quayle, singer/songwriter
  - Jaci Velasquez, Christian singer
- October 16
  - Andre J., entertainer and party promoter
  - Erin Brown, actress
- October 18 – Ne-Yo, singer/songwriter
- October 19 – Habib Azar, director
- October 20
  - Junior Adams, football player and coach
  - Nika Agiashvili, Georgian-born writer and producer
  - Anna Boden, filmmaker
  - John Krasinski, actor
- October 22
  - DJ Abilities, hip hop producer
  - Tony Denman, actor
- October 23 – Charlie Adams, football player
- October 24 – Vince Fong, politician
- October 25 – Sarah Thompson, actress
- October 26
  - Jonathan Chase, actor
  - Josh Portman, bassist for Yellowcard
- October 27
  - Susie Castillo, actress, television host, model, and beauty pageant titleholder, Miss USA 2003
  - George Helmy, politician, U.S. Senator from New Jersey
- October 28
  - Brett Dennen, folk/pop singer/songwriter
  - Glover Teixeira, Brazilian-born mixed martial artist
  - Jawed Karim, German-born software engineer, Internet entrepreneur, and co-founder of YouTube
- October 30 – Kristina Anapau, actress and writer
- October 31
  - Nicholas Angell, ice hockey player
  - Sam Spiegel, DJ, record producer, and composer

=== November ===
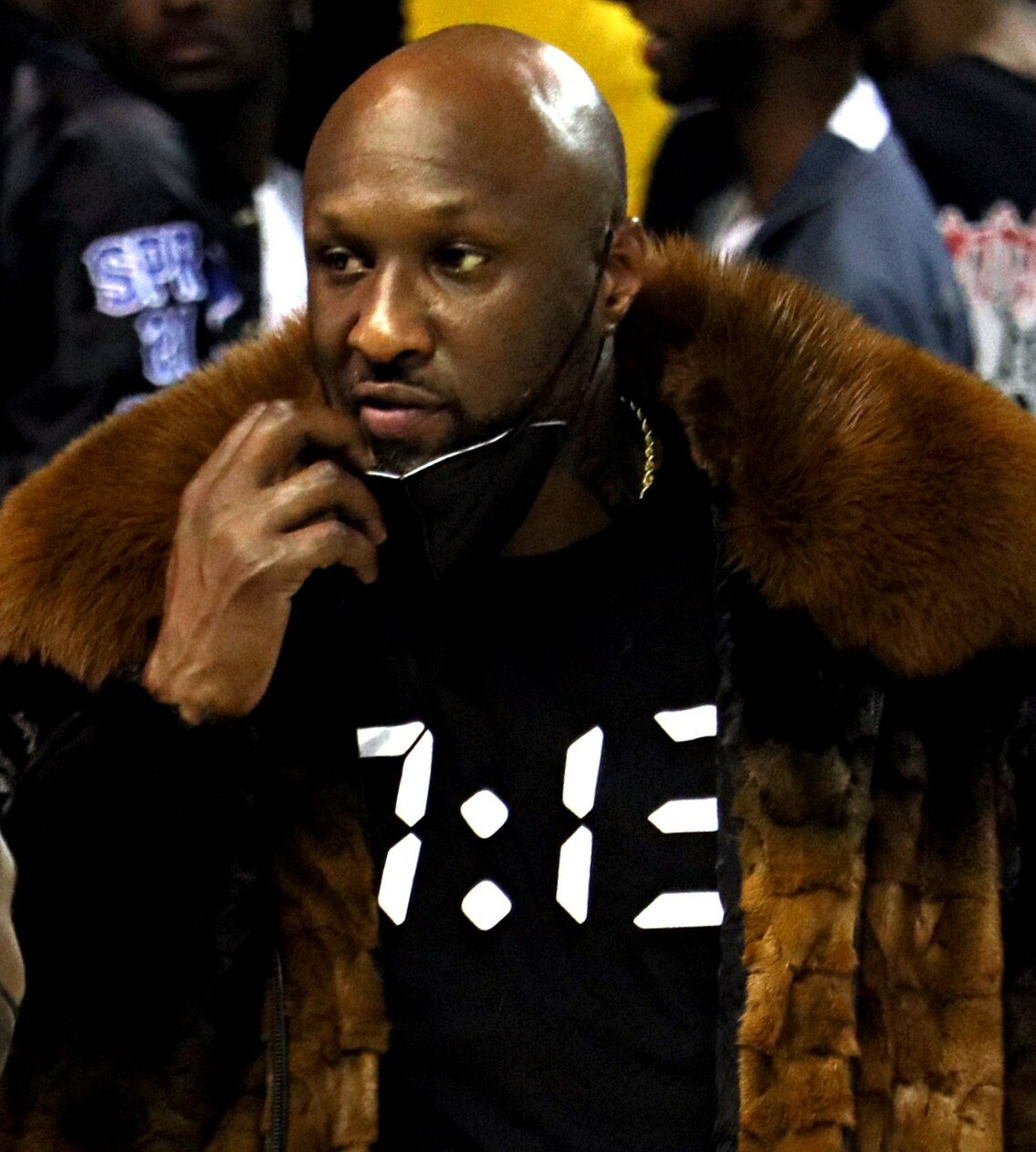
Lamar Odom

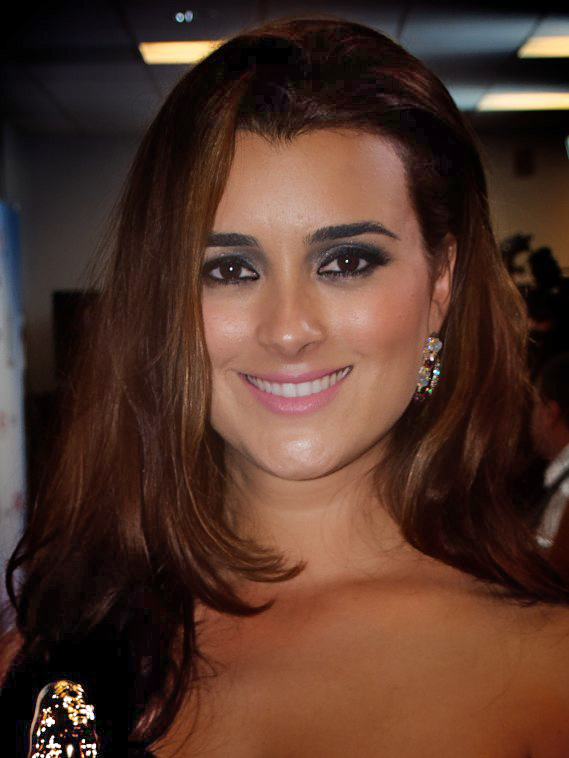
Cote de Pablo

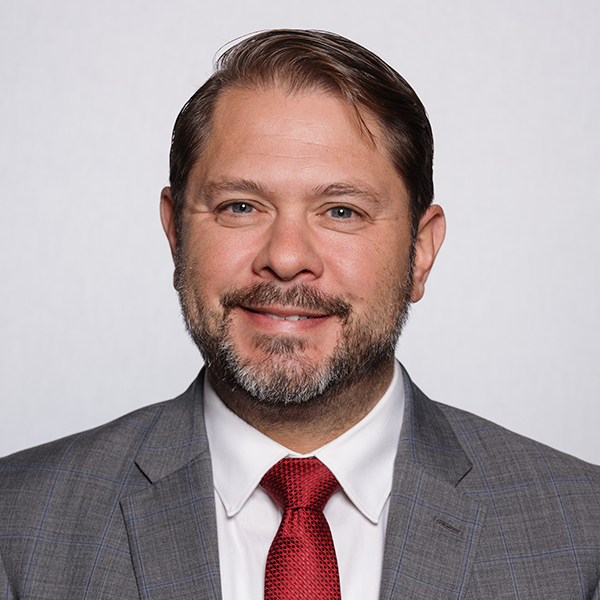
Ruben Gallego

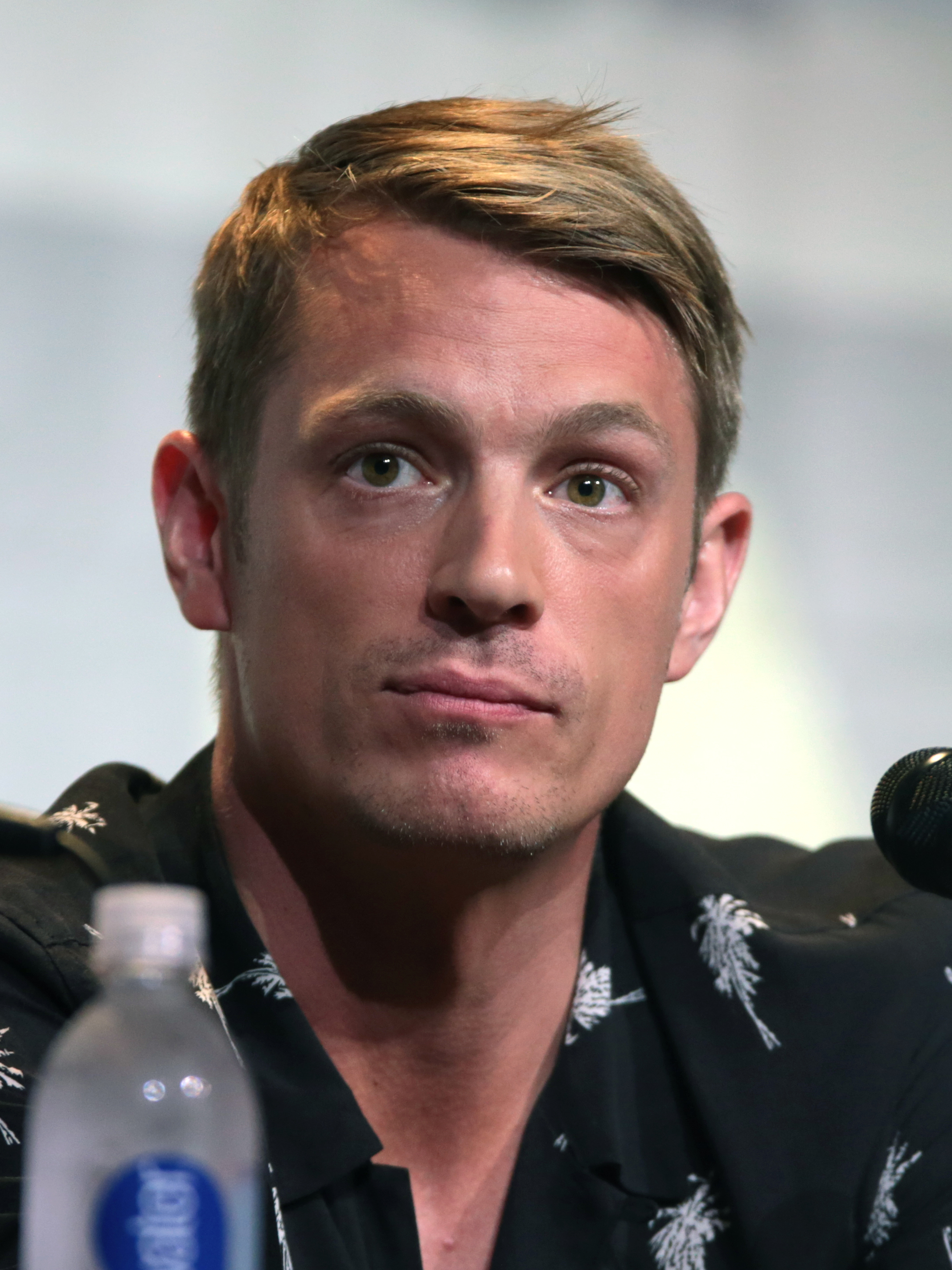
Joel Kinnaman

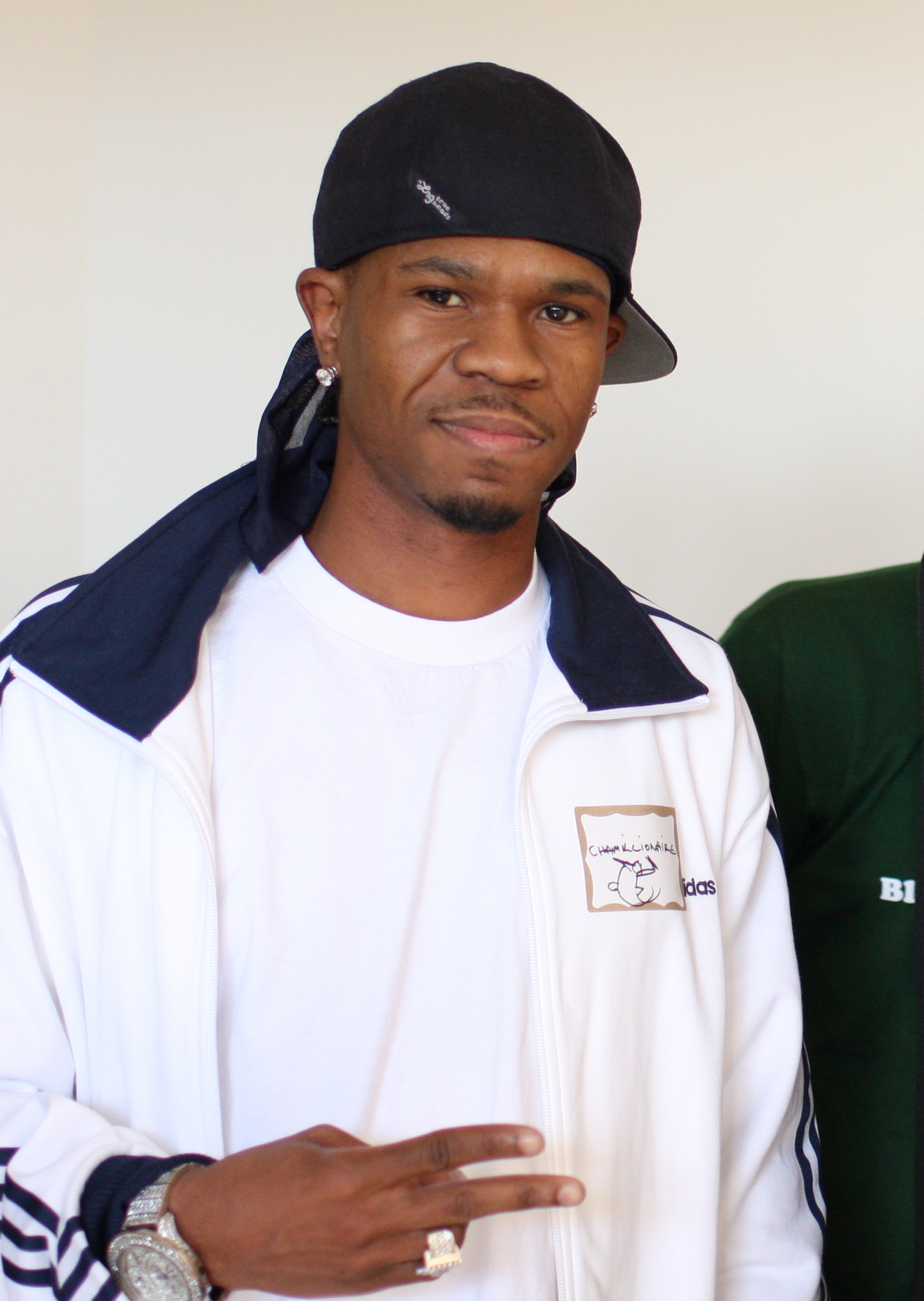
Chamillionaire

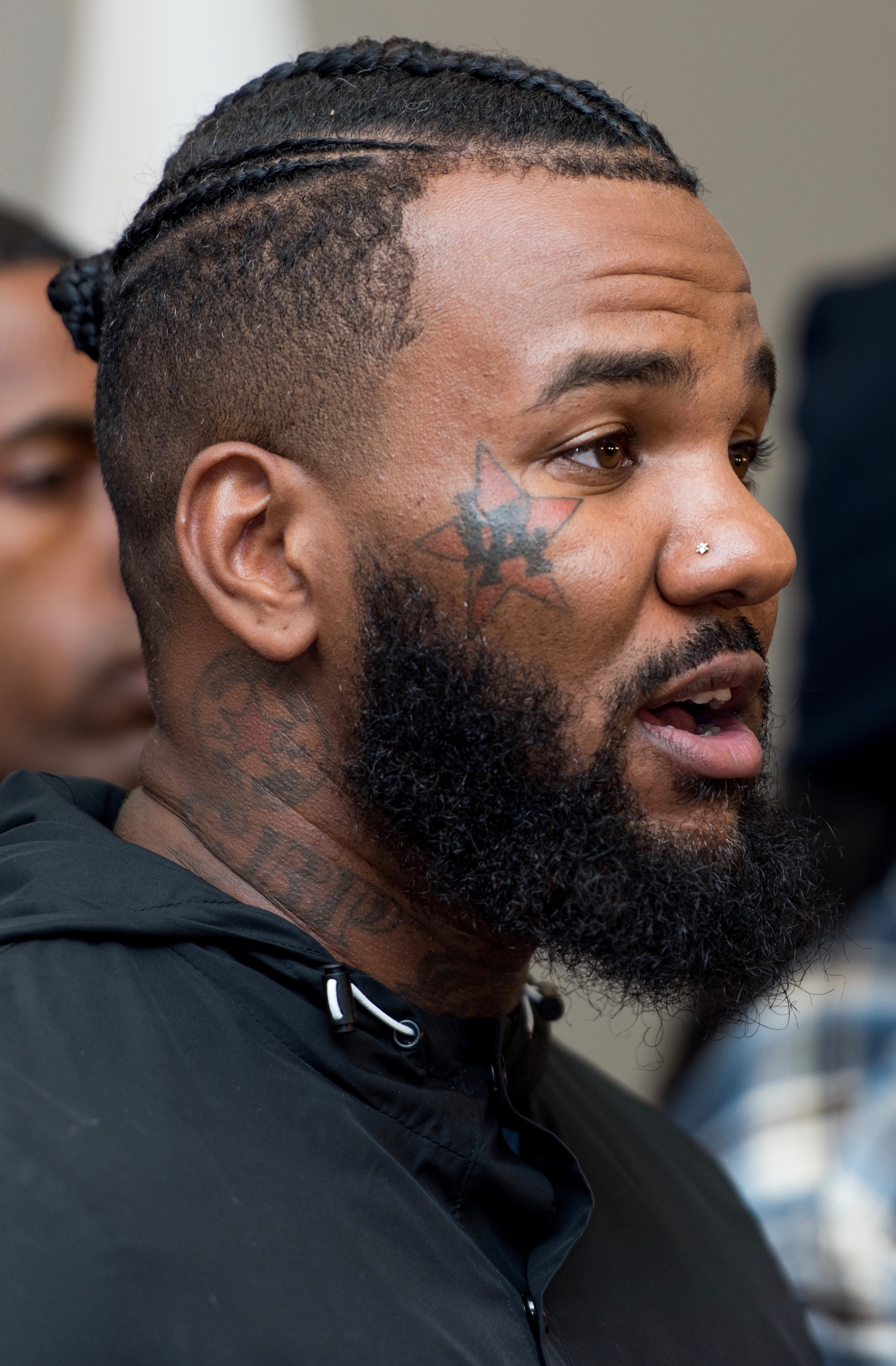
The Game

- November 1 – Coco Crisp, baseball player
- November 2
  - Jon M. Chu, filmmaker
  - Erika Flores, actress
- November 3
  - Matt LaFleur, football player and coach
  - Tim McIlrath, rock singer/songwriter and frontman for Rise Against
- November 4
  - Trishelle Cannatella, actress, model, and television personality
  - Audrey Hollander, porn actress
- November 5 – Jackson Andrews, wrestler
- November 6 – Lamar Odom, basketball player
- November 7
  - Quincy Allen, convicted murderer
  - Jon Peter Lewis, singer/songwriter
  - Joey Ryan, professional wrestler and promoter
  - Otep Shamaya, singer, rapper, and frontwoman for Otep
- November 8 – Dania Ramirez, Dominican-born actress
- November 9
  - Emily Compagno, attorney, podcaster, and television host
  - Adam Dunn, baseball player
  - Cory Hardrict, actor
  - Darren Trumeter, actor and comedian
- November 11 – James Allen, football player
- November 12
  - Matt Cappotelli, wrestler (d. 2018)
  - Crown J, rapper
  - Cote de Pablo, Chilean-born actress
- November 13
  - Henry Wolfe, actor and musician
  - Metta World Peace, basketball player
- November 15 – Brooks Bollinger, football player and coach
- November 18
  - Michael Anestis, clinical psychologist and professor
  - Nate Parker, actor and filmmaker
- November 19
  - Keith Buckley, singer and frontman for Every Time I Die and The Damned Things
  - Ryan Howard, baseball player
  - Barry Jenkins, film director, producer, and screenwriter
  - Larry Johnson, football player
  - Michelle Vieth, American-born Mexican actress and model
- November 20
  - Ruben Gallego, politician
  - Jacob Pitts, actor
- November 22 – Keith Adams, football player
- November 23
  - Yashar Ali, journalist
  - Tim Chiou, actor
  - Jonathan Sadowski, actor
- November 24 – Scotty Anderson, football player
- November 25
  - Jerry Ferrara, actor
  - Joel Kinnaman, Swedish-born actor
- November 26
  - B. J. Averell, actor
  - Beau Dozier, musician and songwriter (d. 2025)
- November 27
  - Ricky Carmichael, motorcycle and stock car racer
  - Hilary Hahn, violinist
- November 28
  - Chamillionaire, rapper
  - Daniel Henney, actor and model
- November 29 – The Game, rapper
- November 30 – Lisa Aguilera, sprinter

=== December ===
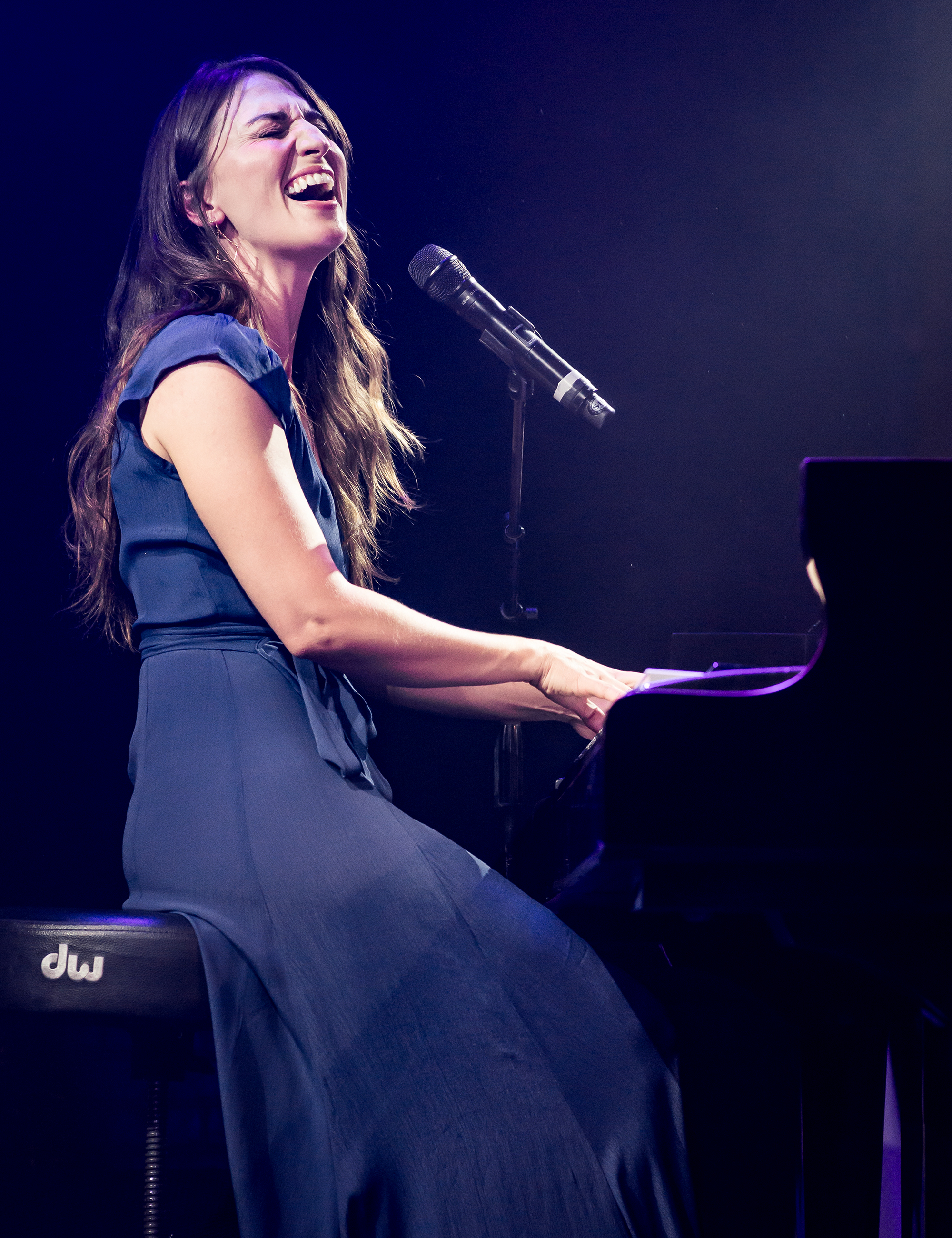
Sara Bareilles

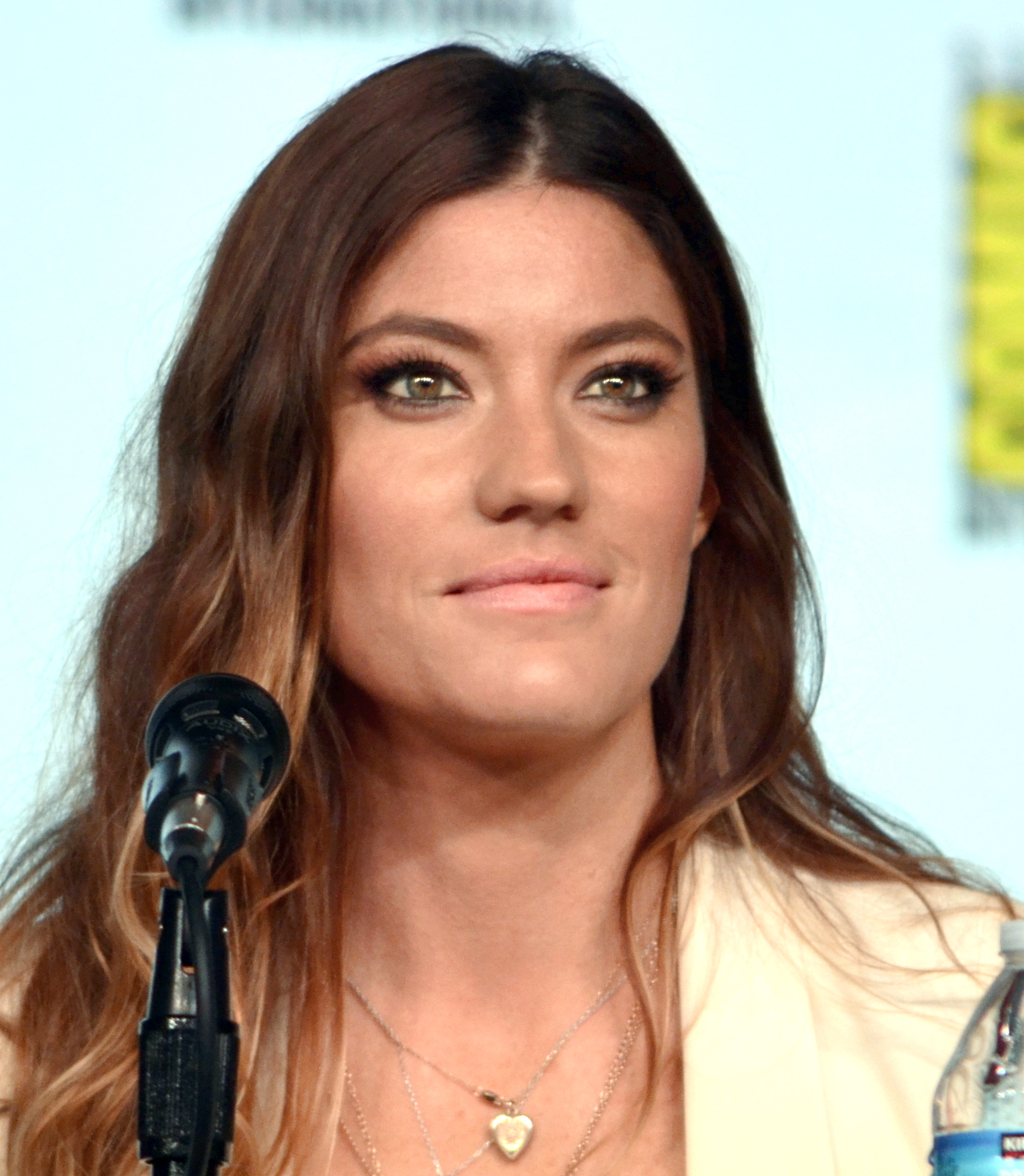
Jennifer Carpenter

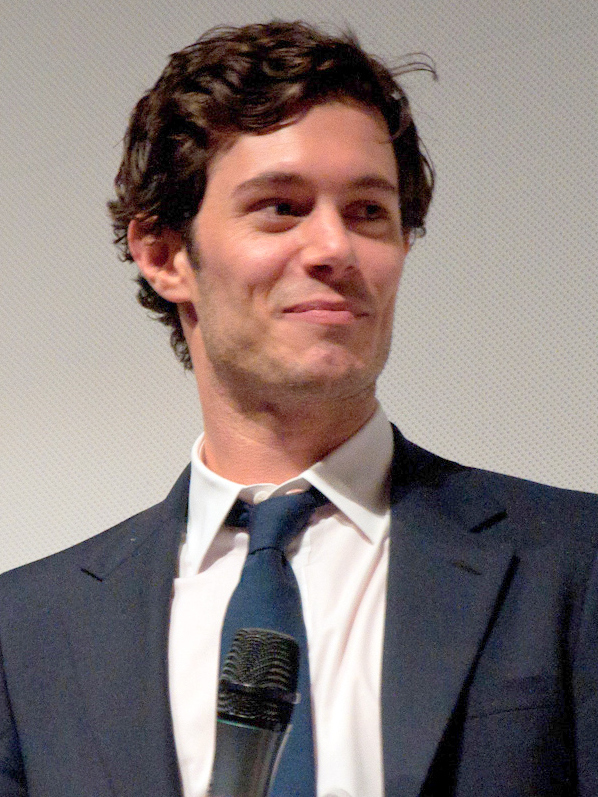
Adam Brody

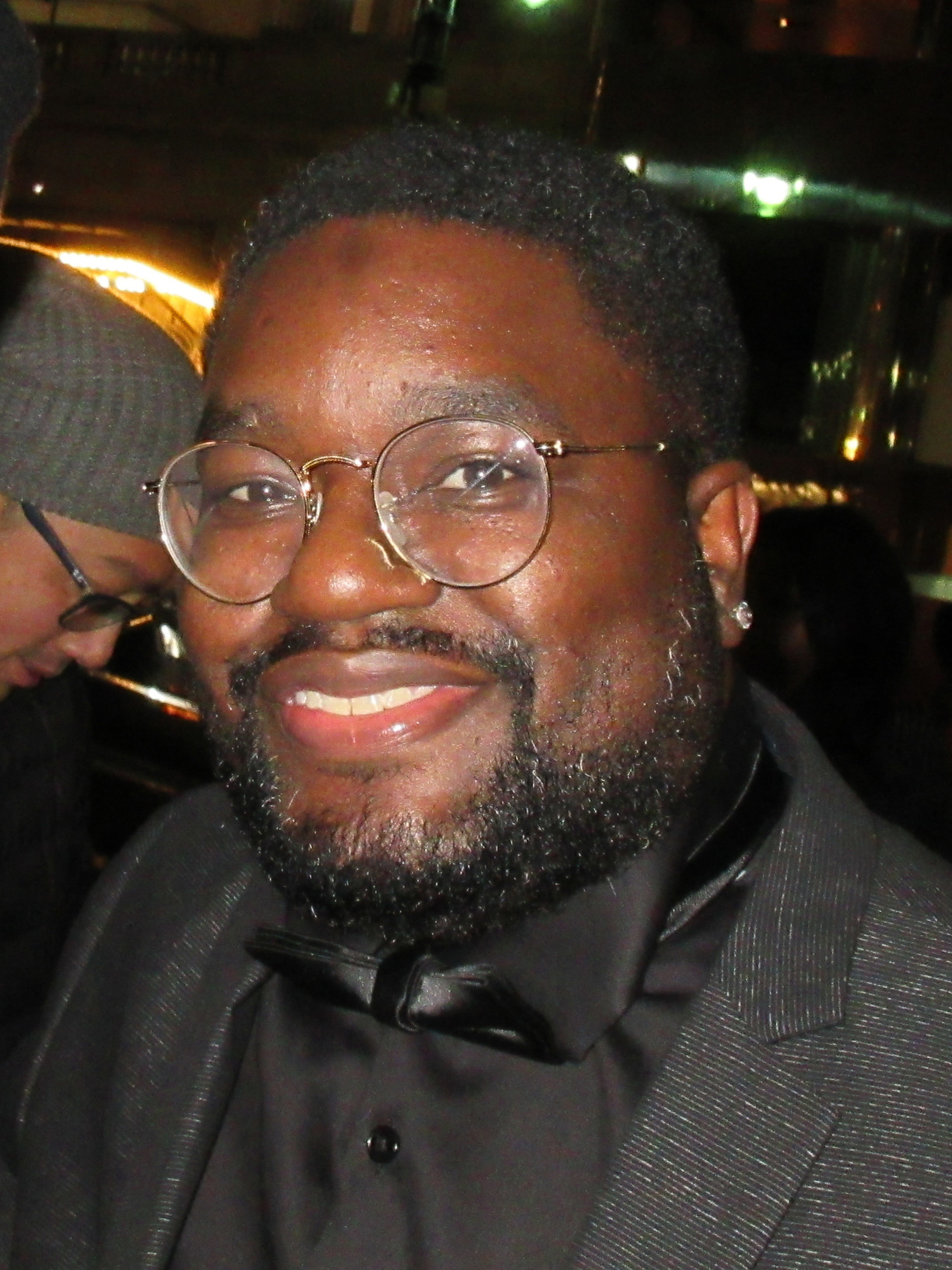
Lil Rel Howery

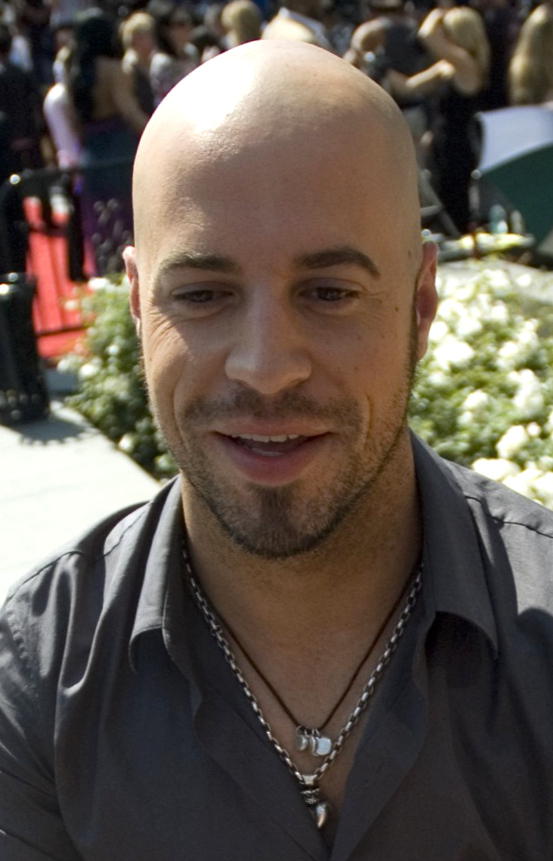
Chris Daughtry

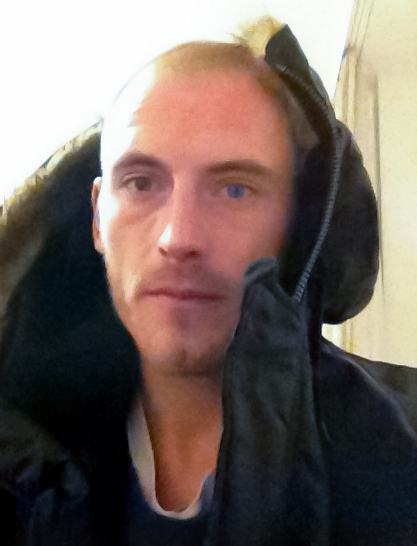
Zach Hill

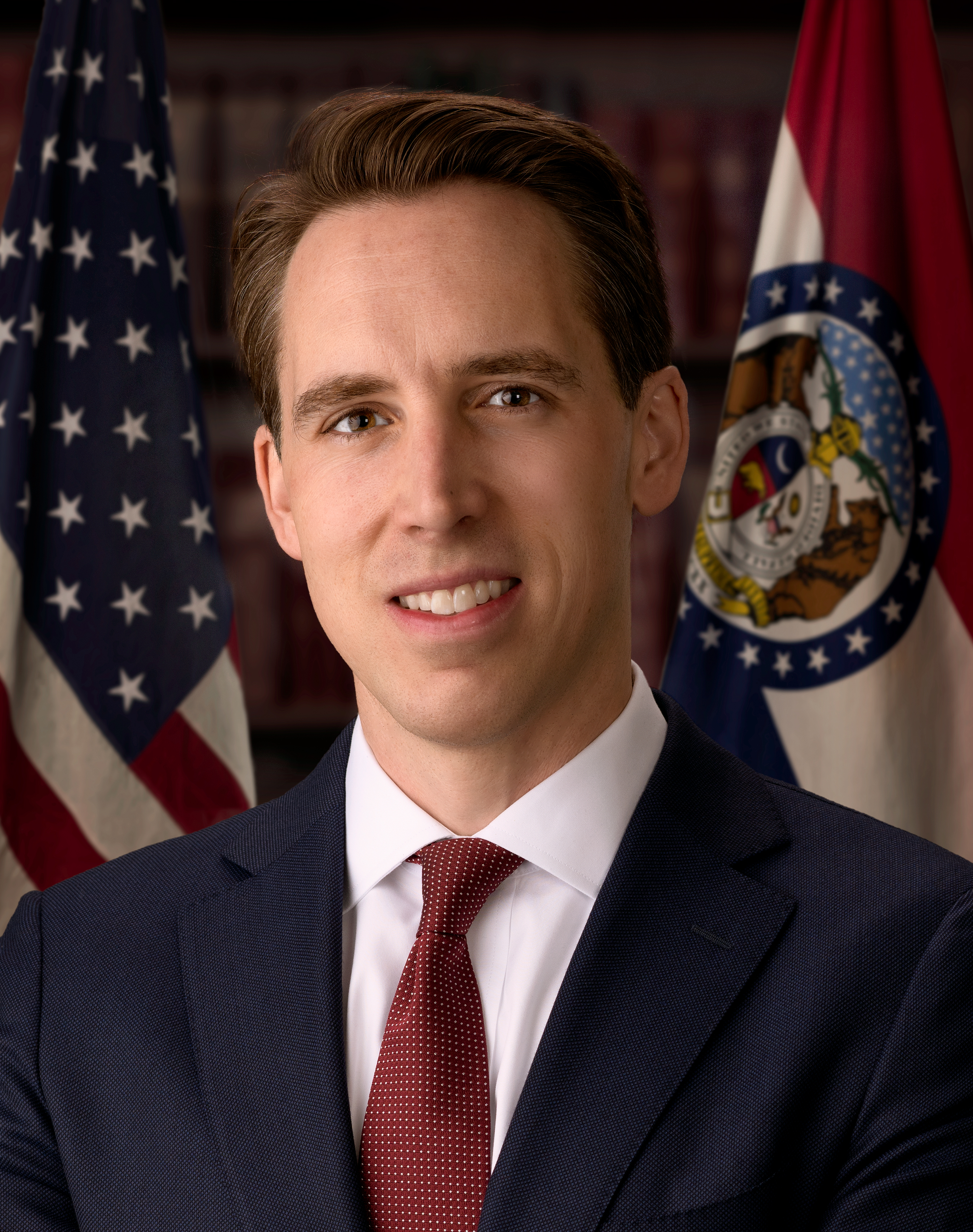
Josh Hawley

- December 2 – Melissa Archer, actress
- December 3
  - Rock Cartwright, football player
  - Robby Mook, political campaign strategist and campaign manager
  - Tiffany Haddish, actress and comedian
  - Sean Parker, entrepreneur and philanthropist, co-founder of Napster
  - Seth Petruzelli, mixed martial artist, kickboxer, wrestler, and entrepreneur
- December 5 – Nick Stahl, actor
- December 6 – Luke Letlow, congressman-elect (d.2020)
- December 7
  - Eric Bauza, Canadian-born voice actor, animator, and comedian
  - Sara Bareilles, singer/songwriter and pianist
  - Jennifer Carpenter, actress
- December 8
  - Paul Dalio, filmmaker and mental health advocate
  - Ingrid Michaelson, indie pop singer-songwriter
- December 11 – Rider Strong, actor
- December 12 – Garrett Atkins, baseball player
- December 14
  - Tony Arnerich, baseball coach
  - Chris Cheng, sport shooter
  - Ahmed Aly Elsayed, snooker player
  - Kyle Shanahan, football coach
- December 15 – Adam Brody, actor
- December 16 – Brodie Lee, wrestler and actor (d. 2020)
- December 17
  - 40 Cal., rapper
  - Jaimee Foxworth, actress and model
  - William Green, football player
  - Lil Rel Howery, actor and comedian
  - Ryan Key, singer/songwriter, rhythm guitarist, and frontman for Yellowcard
  - Matt Murley, hockey player
- December 18 – Amy Grabow, actress
- December 19
  - Chip Ambres, baseball player
  - Kevin Devine, songwriter and musician
- December 20
  - David DeJesus, baseball player
  - Bob Lee, businessman (d. 2023)
- December 22
  - Amanda Baker, actress
  - Liam Wilson, bassist for The Dillinger Escape Plan
- December 23
  - Summer Altice, model and actress
  - Holly Madison, model and television personality
  - Morgan McGarvey, politician
- December 24 – Chris Hero, wrestler
- December 26
  - Angela Angel, politician
  - Chris Daughtry, singer and guitarist
- December 27
  - Melissa Anelli, author and webmistress
  - Rutherford Chang, conceptual artist (d. 2025)
  - Carson Palmer, football player
- December 28
  - James Blake, tennis pro
  - André Holland, actor
  - Robert Edward Davis, American-born German rapper
  - Zach Hill, drummer for Death Grips
- December 30
  - Catherine Taber, voice, film and television actress
  - Yelawolf, rapper
- December 31
  - Bob Bryar, drummer for My Chemical Romance
  - Josh Hawley, politician

=== Full date unknown ===
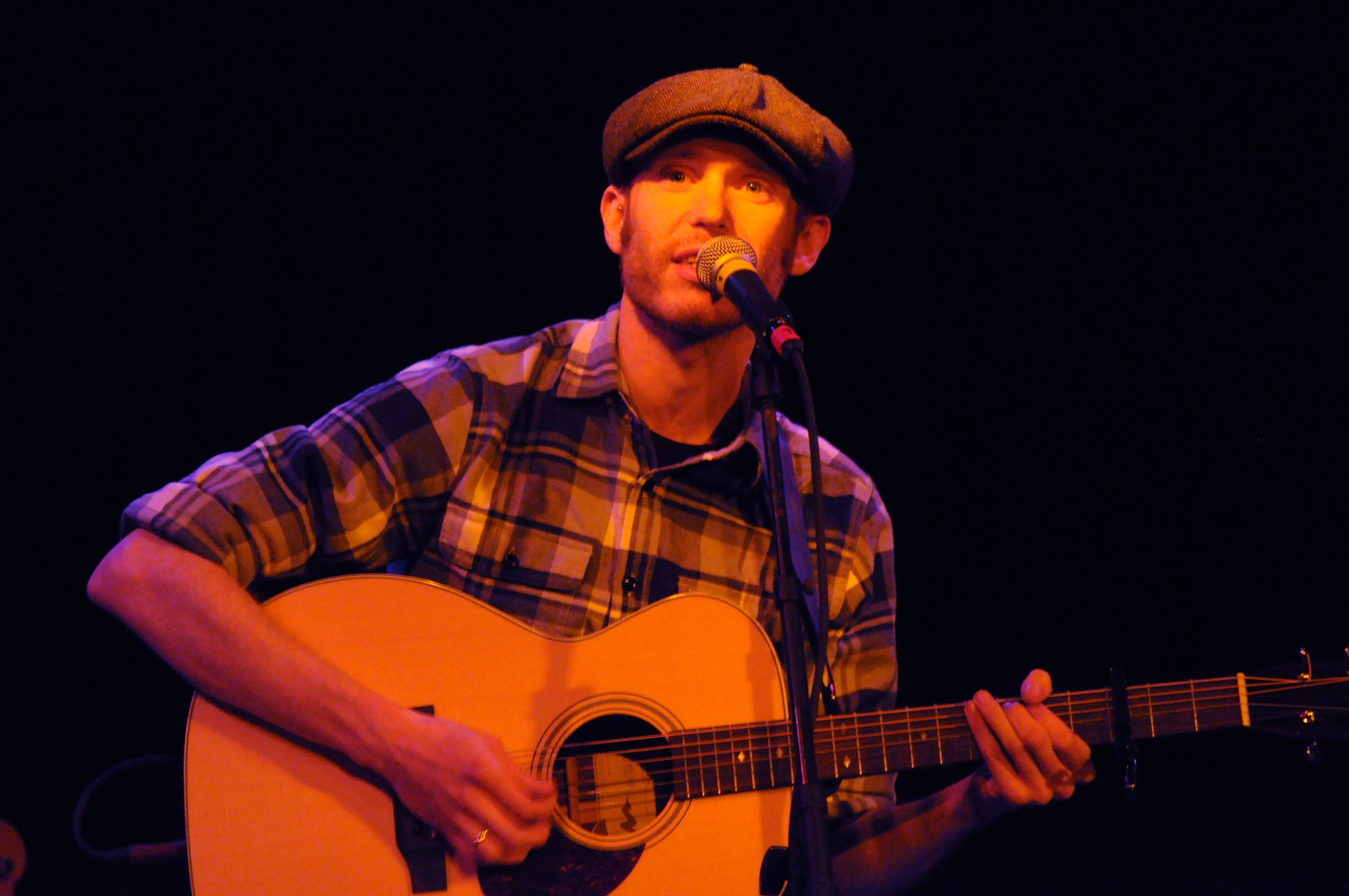
Kasey Anderson

- Kim Abbott, politician
- Amir AghaKouchak, Iranian-born engineer
- Atif Akin, Turkish-born artist
- Bianca Allaine, actress, host, and model
- Linas Alsenas, author and illustrator
- Ashley Altadonna, filmmaker, musician, author, and LGBT activist
- Amateur Gourmet, food writer and blogger
- Kasey Anderson, singer/songwriter, guitarist, producer, and musician
- Meghan Andrews, actress and singer
- Jones Angell, radio announcer
- Lesley Arfin, writer and author
- Dave Atchison, musician
- Brian Avery, anti-war activist
- Imran Awan, Pakistani-born information technology worker
- Kelvin Yu, actor and writer

== Deaths ==
=== January ===
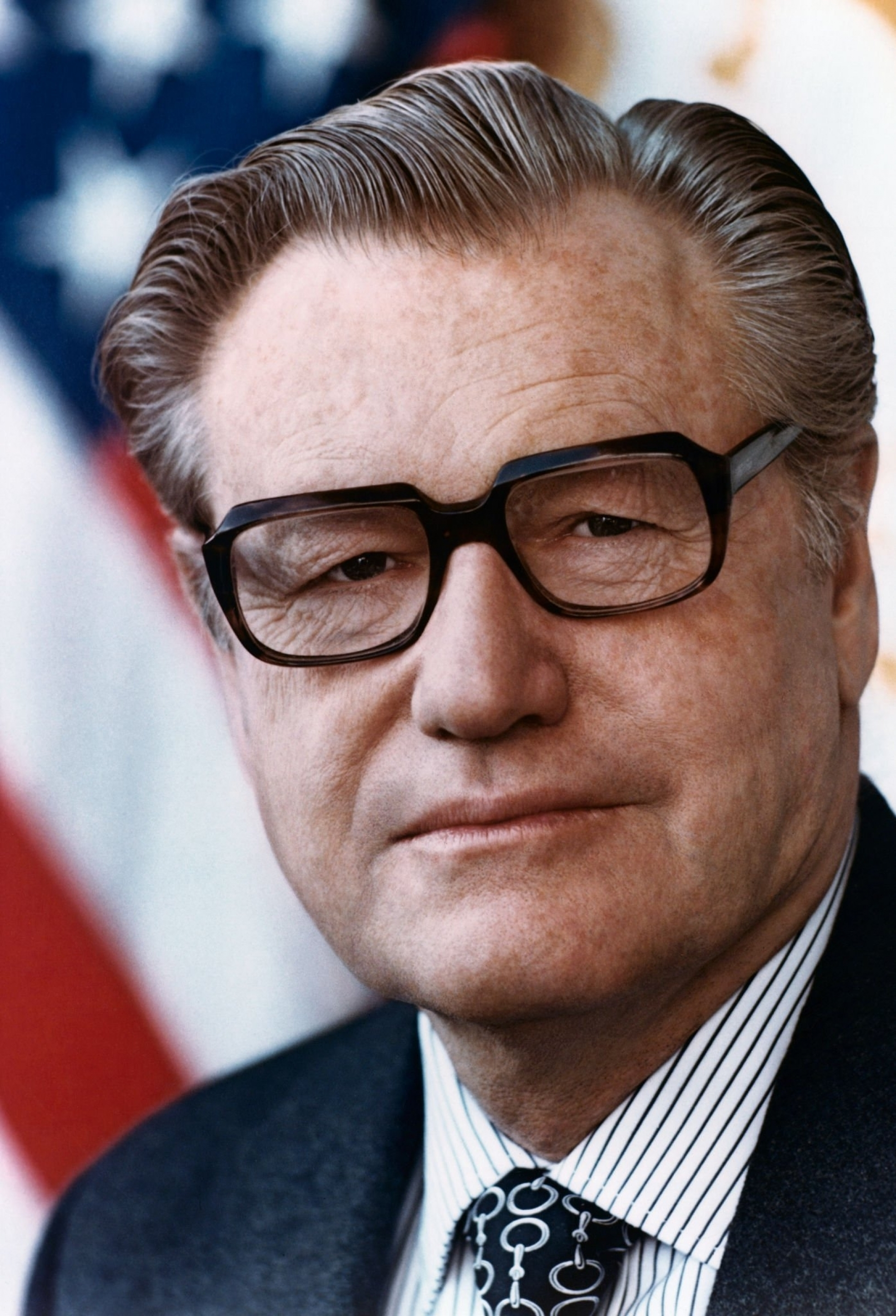
Nelson Rockefeller

- January 3 – Conrad Hilton, American hotelier (b. 1887)
- January 5
  - Billy Bletcher, American actor (b. 1894)
  - Charles Mingus, American musician (b. 1922)
- January 8 – Sara Carter, American singer-songwriter and harp player (b. 1898)
- January 11 – Jack Soo, Japanese-born American actor (b. 1917)
- January 13 – Donny Hathaway, American musician (b. 1945)
- January 14 – Thomas DeSimone, American gangster (b. 1946)
- January 15 – Charles W. Morris, American philosopher and semiotician (b. 1901)
- January 16 – Ted Cassidy, American actor (b. 1932)
- January 25 – Dick Crockett, American actor and stunt performer (b. 1915)
- January 26 – Nelson Rockefeller, 41st vice president of the United States (b. 1908)

=== February ===
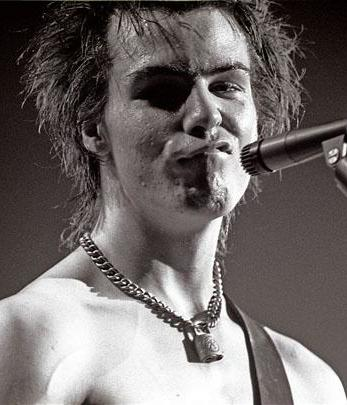
Sid Vicious

- February 1 – William H. Brockman Jr., United States Navy admiral (b. 1904)
- February 2 – Sid Vicious, English musician (b. 1957)
- February 9 – Allen Tate, poet and essayist (born 1899)
- February 16 – William Gargan, American actor (b. 1905)

=== March ===
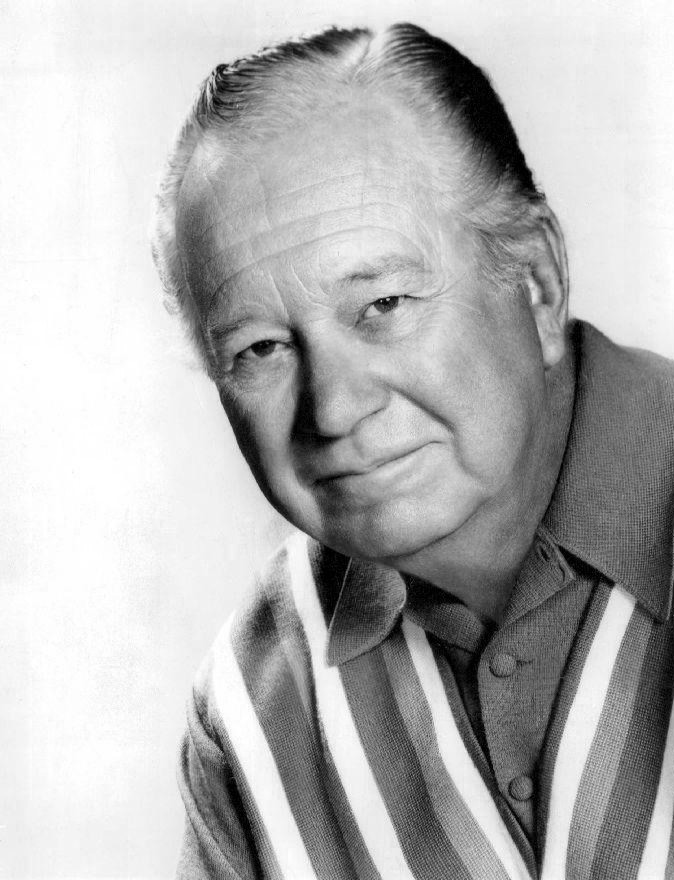
Edgar Buchanan

- March 1 – Dolores Costello, American actress (b. 1903)
- March 11 – Victor Kilian, American actor (b. 1891)
- March 14 – Will Mastin, American vaudevillian (b. 1878)
- March 18 – Marjorie Daw, American actress (b. 1902)
- March 22 – Ben Lyon, American actor (b. 1901)
- March 26 – Jean Stafford, American writer (b. 1915)
- March 28 – Emmett Kelly, American clown (b. 1898)
- March 31 – Doris Packer, American actress (b. 1904)

=== April ===
- April 4 – Edgar Buchanan, American actor (b. 1903)
- April 24 – John Carroll, American actor (b. 1906)

=== May ===
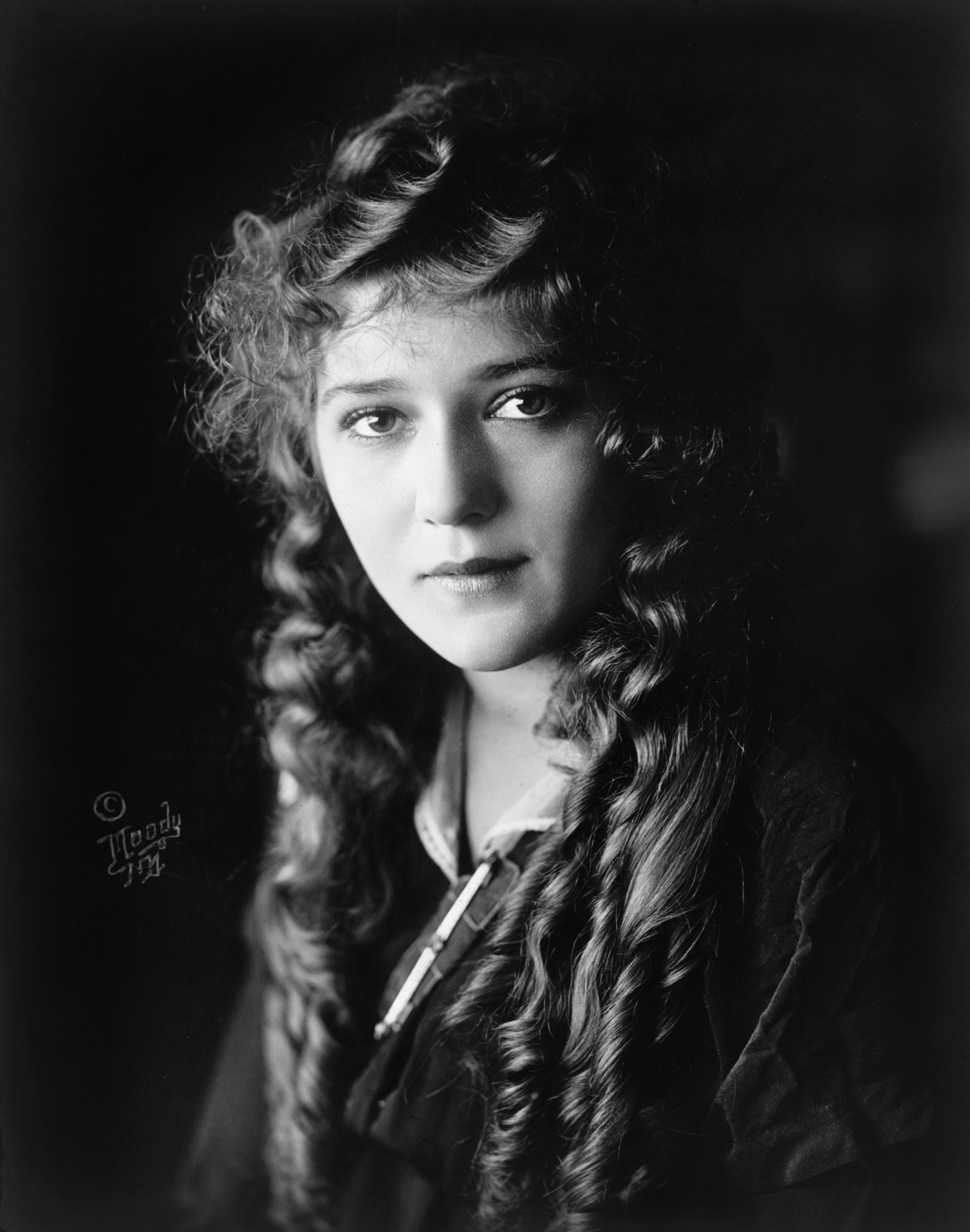
Mary Pickford

- May 6 – Milton Ager, American songwriter (b. 1893)
- May 8
  - Lillian La France, motorcycle stunt rider. (b. 1894)
  - Talcott Parsons, American sociologist (b. 1902)
- May 9 – Eddie Jefferson, American jazz musician (b. 1918)
- May 11
  - Joan Chandler, American actress (b. 1923)
  - Lester Flatt, American musician (b. 1914)
  - Barbara Hutton, American socialite (b. 1912)
- May 16 – A. Philip Randolph, African American labor union leader (b. 1889)
- May 19 – Benjamin W. Fortson Jr, American politician, Georgia Secretary of State (b. 1904)
- May 21 – Bernadette Armiger, American Catholic nun and president of the American Association of Colleges of Nursing (b. 1915)
- May 29 – Mary Pickford, Canadian-American actress and producer (b. 1892)

=== June ===
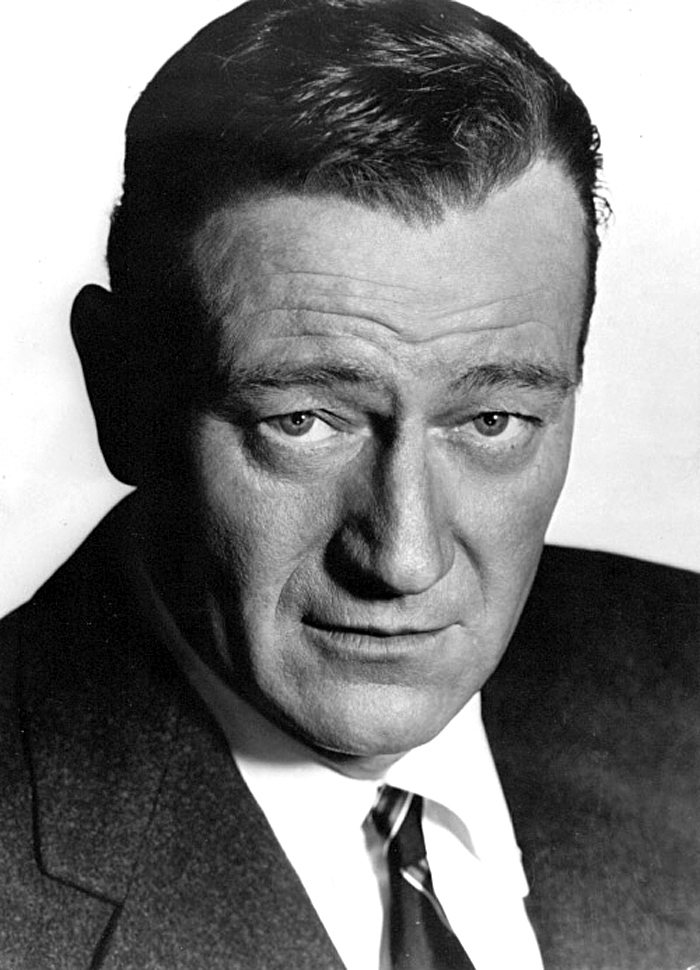
John Wayne

- June 1 – Jack Mulhall, American actor (b. 1887)
- June 2 – Jim Hutton, American actor (b. 1934)
- June 6 – Jack Haley, American actor (b. 1898)
- June 11
  - Loren Murchison, American Olympic athlete (b. 1898)
  - John Wayne, American actor and film director (b. 1907)
- June 13
  - George Cisar, American screen character actor (b. 1912)
  - Darla Hood, American actress (b. 1931)
  - Billy Nelson, American actor (b. 1903)
- June 15 – Laurie Bird, American actress and photographer (b. 1953)
- June 22 – Hope Summers, American actress (b. 1902)
- June 25
  - Dave Fleischer, American animator (b. 1894)
  - Philippe Halsman, Latvian-born American photographer (b. 1906)
- June 29 – Lowell George, American singer-songwriter, musician, and record producer (b. 1945)

=== July ===
Robert Burns Woodward

- July 4 – Theodora Kroeber, American writer and anthropologist (b. 1897)
- July 6 – Van McCoy, American musician, (The Hustle) (b. 1940)
- July 7 – Morris Talpalar, sociologist (b. 1900)
- July 8
  - Elizabeth Ryan, American 30 Grand Slam (tennis) Tennis Champion (b. 1892)
  - Robert Burns Woodward, American chemist, Nobel Prize laureate (b. 1917)
- July 10 – Arthur Fiedler, American conductor (Boston Pops) (b. 1894)
- July 12 – Minnie Riperton, American rhythm and blues singer (Lovin' You) (b. 1947)
- July 13 – Corinne Griffith, American actress and author (b. 1894)
- July 28 – George Seaton, American screenwriter and director (b. 1911)
- July 29
  - Herbert Marcuse, German-American philosopher, sociologist and political theorist (b. 1898)
  - Bill Todman, American game show producer (b. 1916)

=== August ===
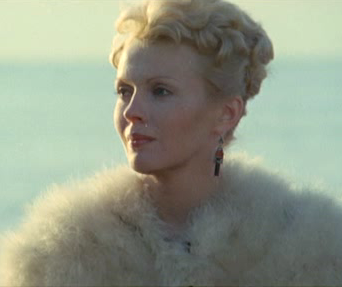
Jean Seberg

- August 2 – Thurman Munson, American baseball player (b. 1947)
- August 9 – Walter O'Malley, American baseball executive (b. 1903)
- August 10 – Dick Foran, American actor (b. 1910)
- August 16 – F. Ryan Duffy, American judge and politician (b. 1888)
- August 17 – Vivian Vance, American actress (b. 1909)
- August 21 – Stuart Heisler, American film and television director (b. 1896)
- August 22 – James T. Farrell, American novelist (b. 1904)
- August 25 – Stan Kenton, American jazz pianist (b. 1911)
- August 26 – Alvin Karpis, American criminal (b. 1907)
- August 30 (body found on September 8) – Jean Seberg, American actress (b. 1938)
- August 31 – Sally Rand, American dancer (b. 1904)

=== September ===
- September 1 – Doris Kenyon, American actress (b. 1897)
- September 24 – Carl Laemmle Jr., American film studio executive (b. 1908)
- September 26
  - John Cromwell, American film director and actor (b. 1887)
  - Arthur Hunnicutt, American actor (b. 1910)
- September 29 – Rudy Lavik, sports coach and administrator (b. 1892)

=== October ===
- October 1 – Dorothy Arzner, American film director (b. 1897)
- October 3
  - Claudia Jennings, American actress and model (b. 1949)
  - Dorothy Peterson, American actress (b. 1897)
- October 6
  - Elizabeth Bishop, American poet (b. 1911)
  - Chapman Revercomb, politician and lawyer (b. 1895)
- October 8 – Emmaline Henry, American actress (b. 1928)
- October 13
  - Rebecca Helferich Clarke, British-born viola player and composer, (b. 1886)
  - Clarence Muse, American actor, filmmaker, and musician.(b. 1889)
- October 15 – Jacob L. Devers, U.S. Army general (b. 1887)
- October 27 – Charles Coughlin, Canadian-American priest (b. 1891)

=== November ===
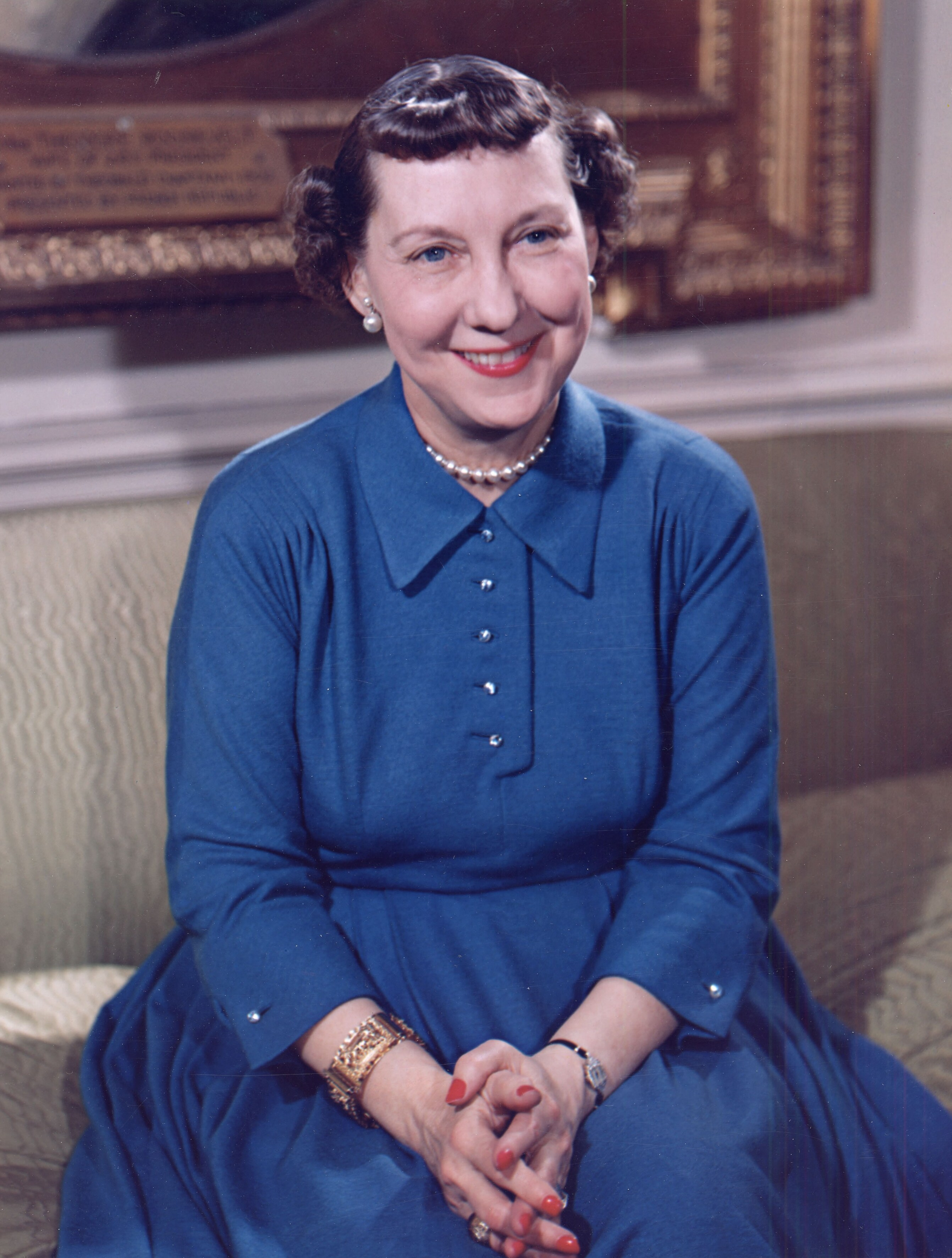
Mamie Eisenhower

- November 1 – Mamie Eisenhower, 34th First Lady of the United States (b. 1896)
- November 5 – Al Capp, American cartoonist (b. 1909)
- November 9 – Louise Thaden, American aviation pioneer (b. 1905
- November 23 – Judee Sill, American singer and songwriter (b. 1944)
- November 30 – Zeppo Marx, American actor and comedian (b. 1901)

=== December ===
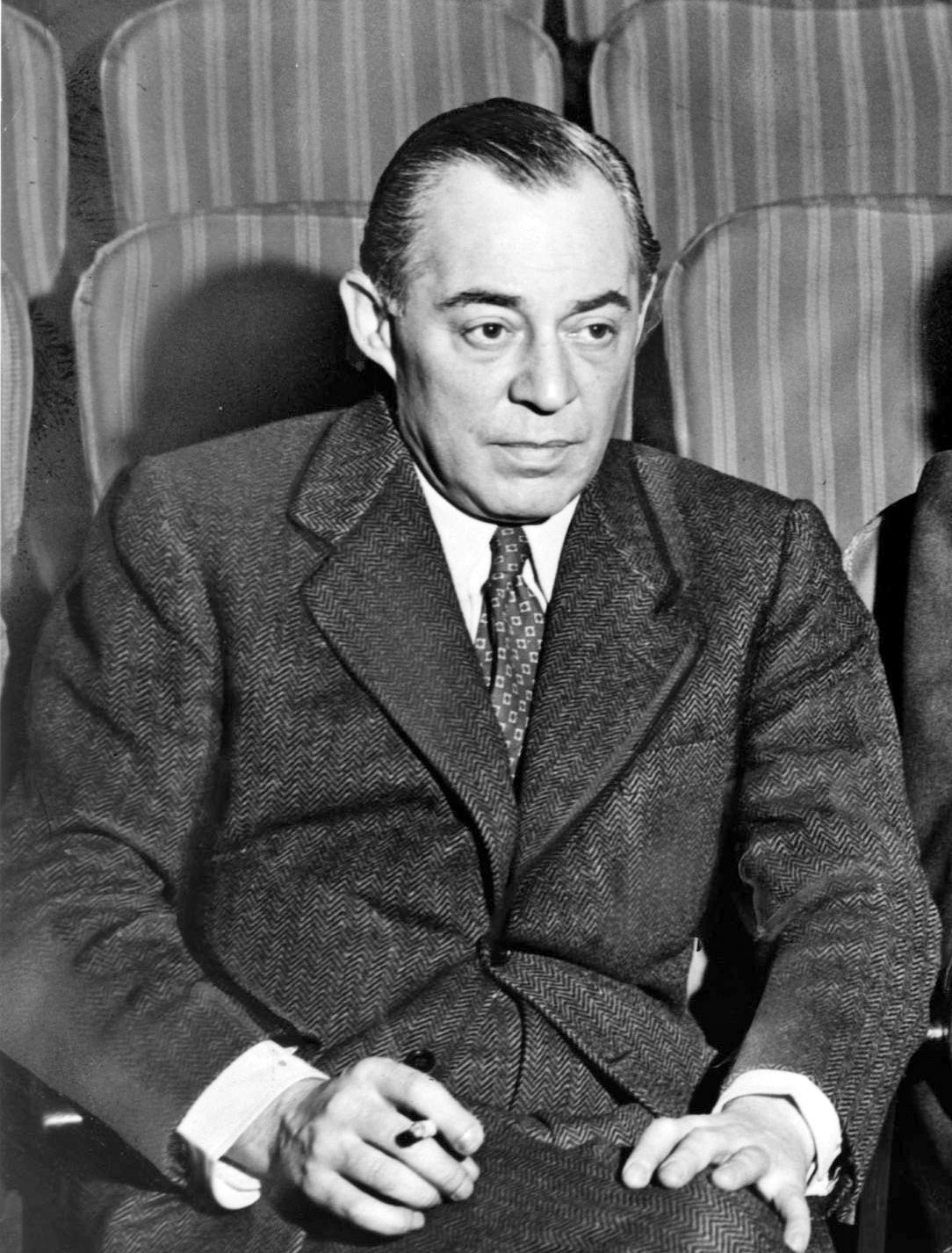
Richard Rodgers

- December 7 – Cecilia Payne-Gaposchkin, British-born American astronomer and astrophysicist (b. 1900)
- December 9 – Fulton J. Sheen, American Roman Catholic bishop and venerable (b. 1895)
- December 10 – Ann Dvorak, American actress (b. 1912)
- December 12 – Hilo Hattie, native Hawaiian singer and actress (b. 1901)
- December 13 – Jon Hall, American actor (b. 1915)
- December 15 – Ethel Lackie, American Olympic swimmer (b. 1907)
- December 16 – Murray Gurfein, judge of the Court of Appeals for the Second Circuit (b. 1907)
- December 22 – Darryl F. Zanuck, American film producer (b. 1902)
- December 23
  - Peggy Guggenheim, American art collector (b. 1898)
  - Ernest B. Schoedsack, American film producer and director (b. 1893)
- December 25
  - Joan Blondell, American actress (b. 1906)
  - Lee Bowman, American actor (b. 1914)
- December 30 – Richard Rodgers, American composer (b. 1902)

== See also ==
- 1979 in American television
- List of American films of 1979
- Timeline of United States history (1970–1989)
