= Stockard Channing on stage and screen =

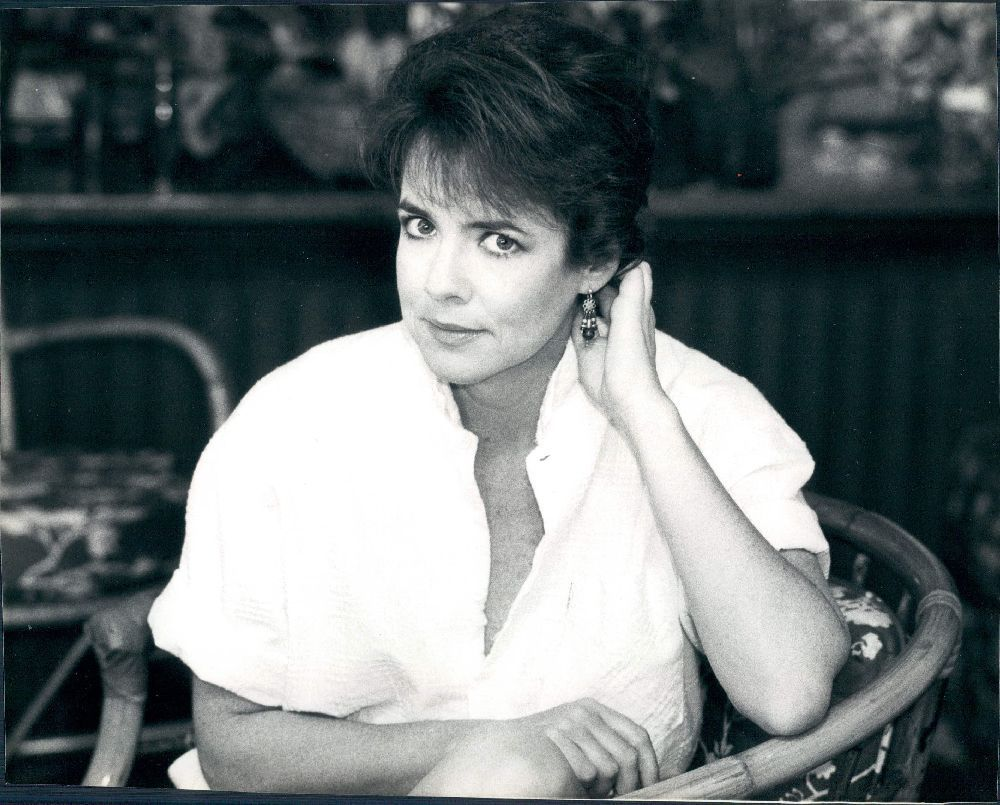
- Occupation: Actress
- Years active: 1969–present

The filmography of Stockard Channing comprises both film and television roles. In a career spanning over five decades, she has appeared in overall 47 feature films, 20 television films and ten television series.

== Filmography ==
=== Film ===
Year	Title	Role	Notes
1971	The Hospital	E.R. Nurse	Uncredited
1972	Up the Sandbox	Judy Stanley	Uncredited
1975	The Lion Roars Again	Unknown	Short film
1975	The Fortune	Freddie	Nominated—Golden Globe for Best Acting Debut in a Motion Picture – Female
1976	Sweet Revenge	Vurrla Kowsky	Also known as Dandy, the All American Girl
1976	The Big Bus	Kitty Baxter	
1978	The Cheap Detective	Bess	
1978	Grease	Betty Rizzo	
1979	The Fish That Saved Pittsburgh	Mona Mondieu	
1982	Safari 3000	J.J. Dalton	
1983	Without a Trace	Jocelyn Norris	
1986	Heartburn	Julie Siegel	
1986	The Men's Club	Nancy	
1988	A Time of Destiny	Margaret	
1989	Staying Together	Nancy Trainer	
1991	Meet the Applegates	Jane Applegate	
1991	Married to It	Iris Morden	
1992	Bitter Moon	Beverly	Cameo appearance, uncredited
1993	Six Degrees of Separation	Ouisa Kittredge	Nominated—Academy Award for Best Actress; Nominated—Chicago Film Critics Association Award for Best Actress; Nominated—Golden Globe for Best Performance by an Actress in a Motion Picture – Comedy/Musical; Nominated—National Society of Film Critics Award for Best Actress
1995	Smoke	Ruby McNutt	Nominated—Screen Actors Guild Award for Outstanding Performance by a Female Actor in a Supporting Role
1995	To Wong Foo, Thanks for Everything! Julie Newmar	Carol Ann	
1996	Up Close & Personal	Marcia MacGrath	Blockbuster Entertainment Award for Favorite Supporting Actress – Romance
1996	Edie & Pen	Pen	
1996	Moll Flanders	Mrs Allworthy	Nominated—Satellite Award for Best Performance by an Actress in a Supporting Role in a Motion Picture – Drama
1996	The First Wives Club	Cynthia Swann-Griffin	National Board of Review Award for Best Acting by an Ensemble
1998	Twilight	Lieutenant Verna Hollander	
1998	Lulu on the Bridge	Celia's Agent	Uncredited
1998	Practical Magic	Aunt Frances Owens	Blockbuster Entertainment Award for Favorite Supporting Actress – Comedy/Romance
1999	The Venice Project	Chandra Chase	
2000	Other Voices	Dr. Grover	
2000	Isn't She Great	Florence Maybelle	
2000	Where the Heart Is	Thelma 'Sister' Husband	
2001	The Business of Strangers	Julie Styron	London Film Critics' Circle Award for Actress of the Year; Nominated—American Film Institute Award for Female Actor of the Year – Movies
2001	Pearl Harbor: Death of the Arizona	Narrator	
2002	Life or Something Like It	Deborah Connors	
2002	Behind the Red Door	Julia	
2003	Bright Young Things	Mrs. Melrose Ape	
2003	Le Divorce	Margeeve Walker	
2003	Anything Else	Paula Chase	
2004	Home of the Brave	Narrator	Documentary film
2004	From the Bottom Up	Unknown	Short film
2005	Red Mercury	Penelope	
2005	Must Love Dogs	Dolly	
2005	3 Needles	Olive Cowie	
2007	Sparkle	Sheila	
2010	Multiple Sarcasms	Pamela	
2013	Pulling Strings	Virginia	AKA Amor a primera vista
2022	Angry Neighbors	Chloe	
2026	Practical Magic 2	Aunt Frances Owens	

=== Television ===
Year	Title	Role	Notes
1971	Sesame Street	Woman in "Number Painter" films	Various segments
1973	The Girl Most Likely To...	Miriam Knight	TV movie
1973	Love, American Style	Marsha Sue	Episode: "Love and the Eat's Cafe"
1974	Medical Center	Shirley	Episode: "Spectre"
1977	Lucan	Micky MacElwaine	Episode: "Pilot"
1979	Silent Victory: The Kitty O'Neil Story	Kitty O'Neil	TV movie
1979	Stockard Channing in Just Friends	Susan Hughes	13 episodes
1980	The Stockard Channing Show	Susan Goodenow	13 episodes
1985	Not My Kid	Helen Bowler	TV movie
1987	The Room Upstairs	Leah Lazenby	TV movie
1987	Echoes in the Darkness	Susan Reinert	Miniseries; Nominated—Primetime Emmy Award for Outstanding Supporting Actress in a Miniseries or Special
1988	Tidy Endings	Marion	TV movie Nominated—CableACE Award for Actress in a Dramatic or Theatrical Special
1989	Perfect Witness	Liz Sapperstein	TV movie Nominated—Primetime Emmy Award for Outstanding Supporting Actress in a Miniseries or Special
1989	Trying Times	Hilda Bundt	Episode: "The Sad Professor"
1994	Road to Avonlea	Viola Elliot	2 episodes Won—CableACE Award for Actress in a Dramatic Series; Nominated—Primetime Emmy Award for Outstanding Guest Actress in a Drama Series
1994	David's Mother	Bea	TV movie
1995	Mr. Willowby's Christmas Tree	Miss Adelaide	Christmas special, short
1996	Lily Dale	Corella	TV movie
1996	The Prosecutors	Ingrid Maynard	TV movie
1996	An Unexpected Family	Barbara Whitney	TV movie Nominated—Primetime Emmy Award for Outstanding Lead Actress in a Miniseries or Special; Nominated—Screen Actors Guild Award for Outstanding Performance by a Female Actor in a Miniseries or Television Movie
1997	King of the Hill	Mrs. Holloway	Voice, episode: "The Company Man"
1998	The Baby Dance	Rachel Luckman	TV movie Nominated—Primetime Emmy Award for Outstanding Lead Actress in a Miniseries or Movie; Nominated—Golden Globe for Best Performance by an Actress in a Mini-Series or Motion Picture Made for TV; Nominated—Independent Spirit Award for Best Supporting Female; Nominated—OFTA Award for Best Actress in a Motion Picture or Miniseries; Nominated—Screen Actors Guild Award for Outstanding Performance by a Female Actor in a TV Movie or Miniseries
1998	An Unexpected Life	Barbara Whitney	TV movie
1999–2000	Batman Beyond	Barbara Gordon	Voice, 8 episodes
1999–2006	The West Wing	Abbey Bartlet	58 episodes Primetime Emmy Award for Outstanding Supporting Actress in a Drama Series (2002); OFTA Award for Best Guest Actress in a Drama Series; OFTA Award for Best Supporting Actress in a Drama Series (2001); OFTA Award for Best Ensemble in a Drama Series (2000–02); Screen Actors Guild Award for Outstanding Performance by an Ensemble in a Drama Series (2001); Nominated—Primetime Emmy Award for Outstanding Supporting Actress in a Drama Series (2000–01, 2003–05); Nominated—OFTA Award for Best Supporting Actress in a Drama Series (2002); Nominated—Screen Actors Guild Award for Outstanding Performance by a Female Actor in a Drama Series (2001, 2003); Nominated—Screen Actors Guild Award for Outstanding Performance by an Ensemble in a Drama Series (2002–04); Nominated—TV Guide Award for Supporting Actress of the Year in a Drama Series
2000	The Truth About Jane	Janice	TV movie Nominated—Screen Actors Guild Award for Outstanding Performance by a Female Actor in a TV Movie or Miniseries
2001	A Girl Thing	Dr. Beth Noonan	TV movie
2001	When Billie Beat Bobby	Narrator	TV movie; uncredited
2001	Walking with Prehistoric Beasts	Narrator (U.S. version)	Documentary miniseries
2002	Confessions of an Ugly Stepsister	Margarethe	TV movie
2002	The Matthew Shepard Story	Judy Shepard	TV movie Primetime Emmy Award for Outstanding Supporting Actress in a Miniseries or Movie; Nominated—OFTA Award for Best Actress in a Motion Picture or Miniseries; Nominated—Screen Actors Guild Award for Outstanding Performance by a Female Actor in a TV Movie or Miniseries; Nominated—Satellite Award for Best Performance by an Actress in a Miniseries or a Motion Picture Made for TV
2003	Hitler: The Rise of Evil	Klara Hitler	TV movie
2003	The Piano Man's Daughter	Lily Kilworth	TV movie
2004	Jack	Anne	TV movie Daytime Emmy Award for Outstanding Performer in a Children/Youth/Family Special
2005–2006	Out of Practice	Dr. Lydia Barnes	21 episodes Nominated—Primetime Emmy Award for Outstanding Lead Actress in a Comedy Series
2009	The Cleveland Show	Lydia Waterman	Voice, episode: "A Cleveland Brown Christmas"
2010	Sundays at Tiffany's	Vivian Claremont	TV movie
2012–2016	The Good Wife	Veronica Loy	12 episodes
2016	The Mysteries of Laura	Brenda Phillips	2 episodes
2017	The Guest Book	Jill	2 episodes
2017	Difficult People	Bonnie Kessler	Episode: "Passover Bump"
2021	Death to 2021	Penn Parker	Television special
2023	Maryland	Cathy	3 episodes
2023	Julia	Frances Fields	Episode: "Fried Chicken"
2024	Knuckles	Wendy Whipple	Miniseries

== Other appearances ==
=== Theatrical plays ===
Year	Title	Role	Theatre
Dec 1, 1971 – May 20, 1973	Two Gentlemen of Verona	Citizen of Verona and Milan	St. James Theatre
Apr 8, 1973 – Apr 8, 1973	No Hard Feelings	Joanna Wilkins	Martin Beck Theatre
Mar 18, 1980 – Jul 1980	They're Playing Our Song	Sonia Walsk (replacement for Lucie Arnaz)	Imperial Theatre
Apr 12, 1984 – May 6, 1984	The Golden Age	Virginia	Jack Lawrence Theatre
Jul 14, 1984 – Aug 4, 1984	The Rink	Angel (replacement for Liza Minnelli)	Martin Beck Theatre
Mar 27, 1985 – Jun 23, 1985	Joe Egg	Sheila	Longacre Theatre
Apr 29, 1986 – Mar 15, 1987	The House of Blue Leaves	Bunny Flingus	Plymouth Theatre
Nov 7, 1989 – Nov 12, 1989	Love Letters	Melissa Gardner (replacement for Colleen Dewhurst)	Edison Theatre
Nov 8, 1990 – Jan 5, 1992	Six Degrees of Separation	Ouisa Kittredge	Vivian Beaumont Theater
Mar 18, 1992 – Apr 19, 1992	Four Baboons Adoring the Sun	Penny McKenzie	Vivian Beaumont Theater
Apr 27, 1997 – Jun 15, 1997	The Little Foxes	Regina Giddens	Vivian Beaumont Theater
Mar 11, 1999 – May 30, 1999	The Lion in Winter	Eleanor	Criterion Center Stage Right
Dec 8, 2008 – Mar 1, 2009	Pal Joey	Vera Simpson	Studio 54
Nov 3, 2011 – Jun 17, 2012	Other Desert Cities	Polly Wyeth	Booth Theatre
Oct 9, 2014 – Jun 7, 2015	It's Only a Play	Virginia Noyes	Gerald Schoenfeld Theatre; Bernard B. Jacobs Theatre
Jul 29, 2017 – Nov 18, 2017	Apologia	Kristin Miller	Trafalgar Studios
Oct 16, 2018 – Dec 16, 2018	Apologia	Kristin Miller	Laura Pels Theater
Oct 22, 2021 – Dec 4, 2021	'night, Mother	Thelma Cates	Hampstead Theatre
Sep 4, 2024 – Sep 14, 2024	The Gates of Kyiv	Maria Yudina	Theatre Royal, Windsor
Nov 2, 2024	White Rabbit Red Rabbit		@sohoplace
Jan 13, 2025 – Jan 18, 2025; Jan 24, 2025 – Apr 12, 2025	Elektra	Clytemnestra	Theatre Royal, Brighton; Duke of York's Theatre

== See also ==
- List of awards and nominations received by Stockard Channing
