= Jack Somack =

American chemical engineer and actor (1918–1983)

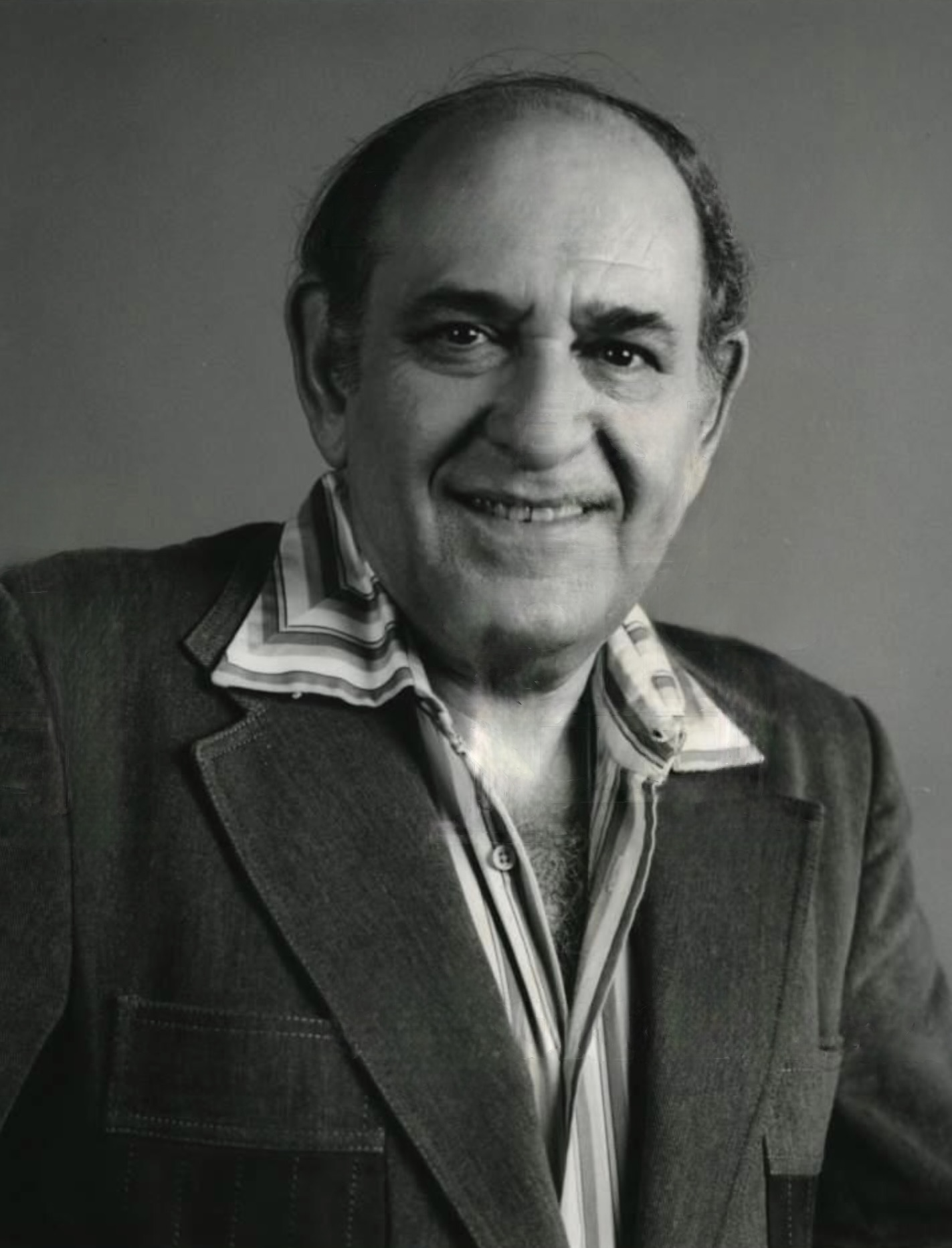
- Somack in Ball Four, 1976
- Born: September 14, 1918; Chicago, Illinois, U.S.
- Died: August 24, 1983 (aged 64); Los Angeles, California, U.S.
- Occupations: Actor, chemical engineer
- Years active: 1966–1983

Jack Somack (September 14, 1918 – August 24, 1983) was an American actor and chemical engineer. He is best remembered for his appearance in the Alka-Seltzer "spicy meatball" television commercial.

== Life and career ==
Somack was born in Chicago, Illinois. He began his acting career in 1966, playing the lead role of Eddie Carbone in Arthur Miller's A View from the Bridge.

In 1969 Somack appeared in the Alka-Seltzer "spicy meatball" commercial. He also appeared in the Broadway plays Paris Is Out! and The Prisoner of Second Avenue.

In the 1970s and 1980s Somack appeared and guest-starred in film and television programs including Barney Miller, The Rockford Files, Portnoy's Complaint, Sanford and Son, All in the Family, The Love Boat, Desperate Characters, Laverne & Shirley, The Frisco Kid, Eight Is Enough, The Pursuit of Happiness, Starsky & Hutch, Hero at Large, Kojak, The Main Event, The Jimmy Stewart Show, The Blue Knight and Family Ties. He also starred in the short-lived television series Ball Four and The Stockard Channing Show.

== Death ==
Somack died August 24, 1983, of a heart attack at the Hollywood Presbyterian Hospital in Los Angeles, at the age of 64. He had been rehearsing for a role in the television series Benson.

== Filmography ==
=== Film ===
Year	Title	Role	Notes
1968	A Punt, a Pass, and a Prayer	Trainer	TV movie
1969	Generation	Airline Policeman	
1970	London Affair	N.Y. Landlord -Loser!!	
1971	The Pursuit of Happiness	Judge Palumbo	
1971	Desperate Characters	Leon	
1972	Heat of Anger	Mr. Stoller	TV movie
1972	Portnoy's Complaint	Jack Portnoy	
1975	Blood Bath	Ralph Lambert	
1979	The Main Event	Murry	
1979	The Frisco Kid	Samuel Bender	
1979	The Little Rascals' Christmas Special	Santa (voice)	TV movie
1980	Hero at Large	Waiter	
1980	Carlton Your Doorman	Charles Shaftman (voice)	TV movie
1983	The Return of the Man from U.N.C.L.E.: The Fifteen Years Later Affair	The Tailor	TV movie

=== Television ===
Year	Title	Role	Notes
1967	Love Is a Many Splendored Thing	Amos Crump	unknown episodes
1969	N.Y.P.D.	Jerry Jameson	1 episode
1971	The Partners	Mr. Kellner	1 episode
1972–1976	All in the Family	Tony Vicino/Tiny Stillberforce	2 episodes
1972	The Jimmy Stewart Show	Coach Wylie	1 episode
1975–1980	Barney Miller	Mr. Cotterman	6 episodes
1975	Sanford and Son	Gabey	1 episode
1975–1978	Kojak	Muttel/Charlie Gerson	2 episodes
1976	The Rockford Files	Oliver Prey	1 episode
1976	The Blue Knight	Mort Kalish	1 episode
1976	Popi	Mr. Goldman	1 episode
1976	Ball Four	'Cap' Capogrosso	5 episodes
1977	Man from Atlantis	Encyclopedia Salesman	1 episode
1977	The Jeffersons	Papa Panelli	1 episode
1978	Starsky & Hutch	Detective Peterson	1 episode
1978	Eight Is Enough		1 episode
1978	Laverne & Shirley	Officer Newman	1 episode
1979	Salvage 1	Burton	1 episode
1979	Stockard Channing in Just Friends	Marty	1 episode
1980	The Stockard Channing Show	Mr. Kramer	7 episodes
1980	The Love Boat	Buzz Plesser	1 episode
1982	Family Ties	Mr. Adler	1 episode
1982	Gloria	Mr. Rosenbloom	1 episode
