= High five =

Hand gesture

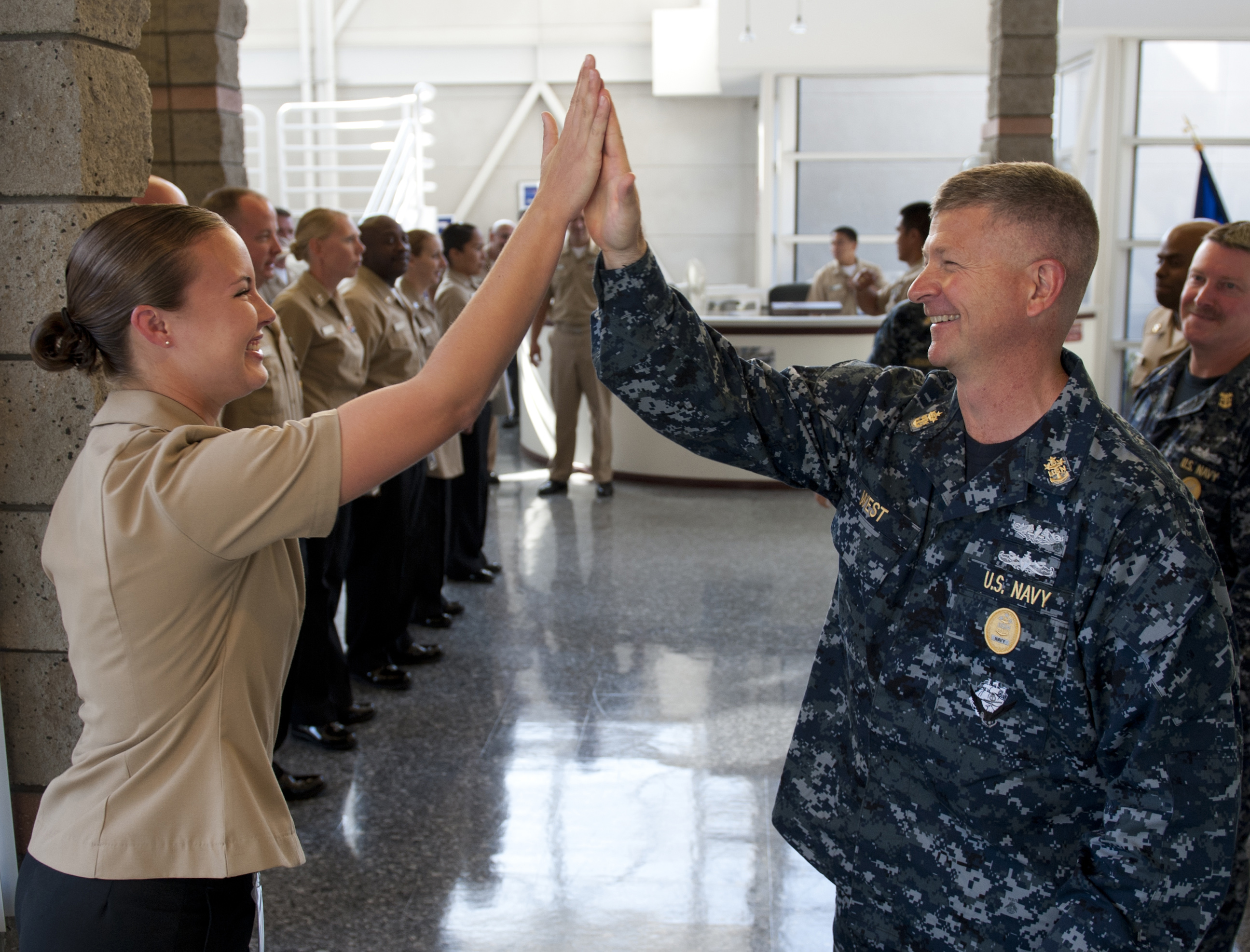
A high five between two U.S. Navy sailors

NASA's Curiosity rover team celebrate with high fives after the landing on Mars, August 2012. Variations seen include: the two-handed high-five; the top-shake swagger; the high-five gauntlet; the air-five; the high-five left hanging.

The high five is a hand gesture whereby two people simultaneously raise one hand and slap the flat of their palm against the other. The gesture is often preceded verbally by a phrase like "Give me five", "High five", or "Up top". Its meaning varies with the context of use but can include as a greeting, congratulations, or celebration.

There are many origin stories of the high five, but the first and two most documented candidates are Dusty Baker and Glenn Burke of the Los Angeles Dodgers professional baseball team on October 2, 1977, and Wiley Brown and Derek Smith of the Louisville Cardinals men's college basketball team during the 1978–1979 season.

== Origin ==
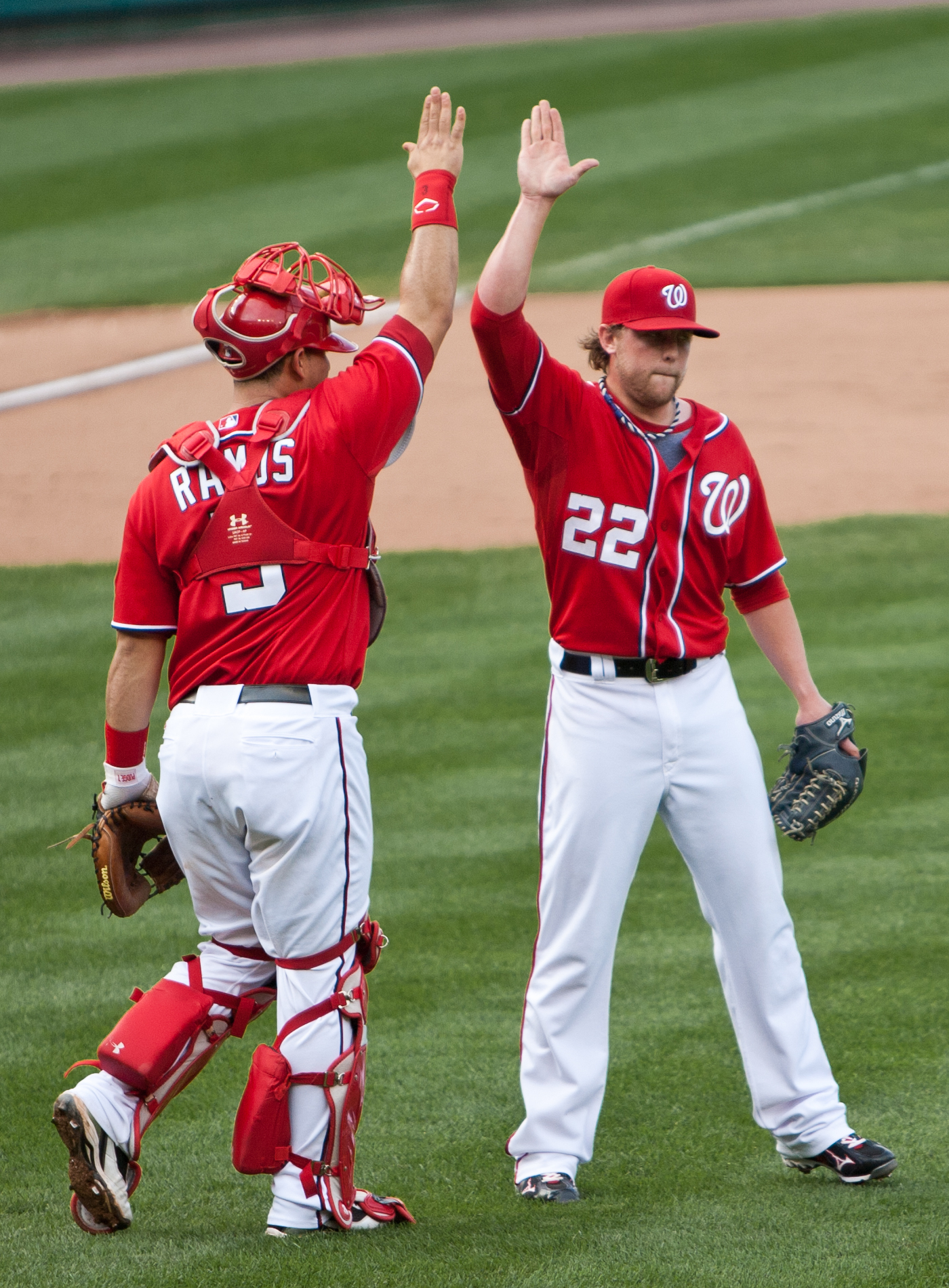
The gesture might have originated in American professional sports. Photo of Drew Storen (right) and Wilson Ramos of the Washington Nationals in 2011.

The use of the phrase as a noun has been part of the Oxford English Dictionary since 1980 and as a verb since 1981. The phrase is related to the slang "give me five" which is a request for some form of handshake – variations include "slap me five", "slip me five", "give me (some) skin" – with "five" referring to the number of digits on a hand. The "high five" originated from the "low five", which has been a part of African-American culture since the 1920s. The exact transition from a low five to a high is unknown, though many theories exist about its inception. Magic Johnson once suggested that he invented the high five at Michigan State, presumably in the late 1970s. Others have suggested it originated in the women's volleyball circuit of the 1960s.

=== Glenn Burke and Dusty Baker ===
For decades, the "conventional wisdom" has been that the origin of the high five occurred between Dusty Baker and Glenn Burke of the Los Angeles Dodgers at Dodger Stadium on October 2, 1977, the last day of the Major League Baseball (MLB) regular season. In the sixth inning, Baker hit a home run off Houston Astros pitcher J. R. Richard. It was Baker's 30th home run of the season, making the Dodgers the first team ever to have four hitters with at least 30 home runs each in a single season. As journalist Jon Mooallem tells the story:

It was a wild, triumphant moment and a good omen as the Dodgers headed to the playoffs. Burke, waiting on deck, thrust his hand enthusiastically over his head to greet his friend at the plate. Baker, not knowing what to do, smacked it. "His hand was up in the air, and he was arching way back," says Baker ... "So I reached up and hit his hand. It seemed like the thing to do."

This story regarding the origin of the high five can be found in the written news as early as September 1982 and is featured in the ESPN 30 for 30 film The High Five directed by Michael Jacobs. After retiring from baseball, Burke, who was one of the first openly gay professional athletes, used the high five with other gay residents of the Castro district of San Francisco, and it became a symbol of gay pride.

=== Louisville Cardinals ===
Another origin story, first reported in 1980, places it at a University of Louisville Cardinals basketball practice during the 1978–1979 season. Forward Wiley Brown went to give a low five to his teammate Derek Smith, but suddenly Smith looked Brown in the eye and said, "No. Up high." Brown thought, "Yeah, why are we staying down low? We jump so high," raised his hand and the high five was supposedly born. High fives can be seen in highlight reels of the 1978–1979 Louisville team. During a telecast of a 1980 game, announcer Al McGuire shouted: "Mr. Brown came to play! And they're giving him the high-five handshake. High five!"

=== Magic Johnson ===
Magic Johnson claims that he invented the high five. He provides no date or location, only that he and teammate Greg Kelser did it on occasion while playing for Michigan State (where Johnson played two seasons from 1977–1979). He did not give it a name, and asserts that Baker–Burke did not invent the high five.

=== Hoax origin claimed by comedy writers ===
In a 2007 press release, two comedy writers and founders of the "National High Five Day" claimed that a late 1970s and early '80s basketball player from Murray State University had invented the gesture. They also concocted an elaborate and involved story about this player as a young boy learning the gesture from his father. But in a 2013 ESPN article, the pair admitted that it had been a publicity stunt. Per the article, the two had "scoured college basketball rosters to plug in a name."

=== Antecedents ===
Antecedents of the physical gesture of slapping palms together predate the 1970s, when the term "high five" is believed to have been coined. For example, it can be seen in the 1960 French Nouvelle vague movie Breathless.

Conventional wisdom holds that the Tokyo district of Roppongi earned the slogan of "High Touch Town" after residents noticed World War II American soldiers walking the streets giving each other high-fives; when the Japanese asked about the gesture it was mistranslated as hai tatchi or "high touch". This story is possibly apocryphal, as Hiroyuki Usui, a representative of the Roppongi Shopkeepers Promotion Association explains, "There is no deep meaning in 'High Touch Town'. People don't know what it means." The term "high touch town" may have originated before the high five and had a different meaning, or 'high touch' may mean "high class", a play on the town's reputation for nightlife activity among off-duty military personnel.

== Variations ==
In addition to the classic high five, several other variations exist.

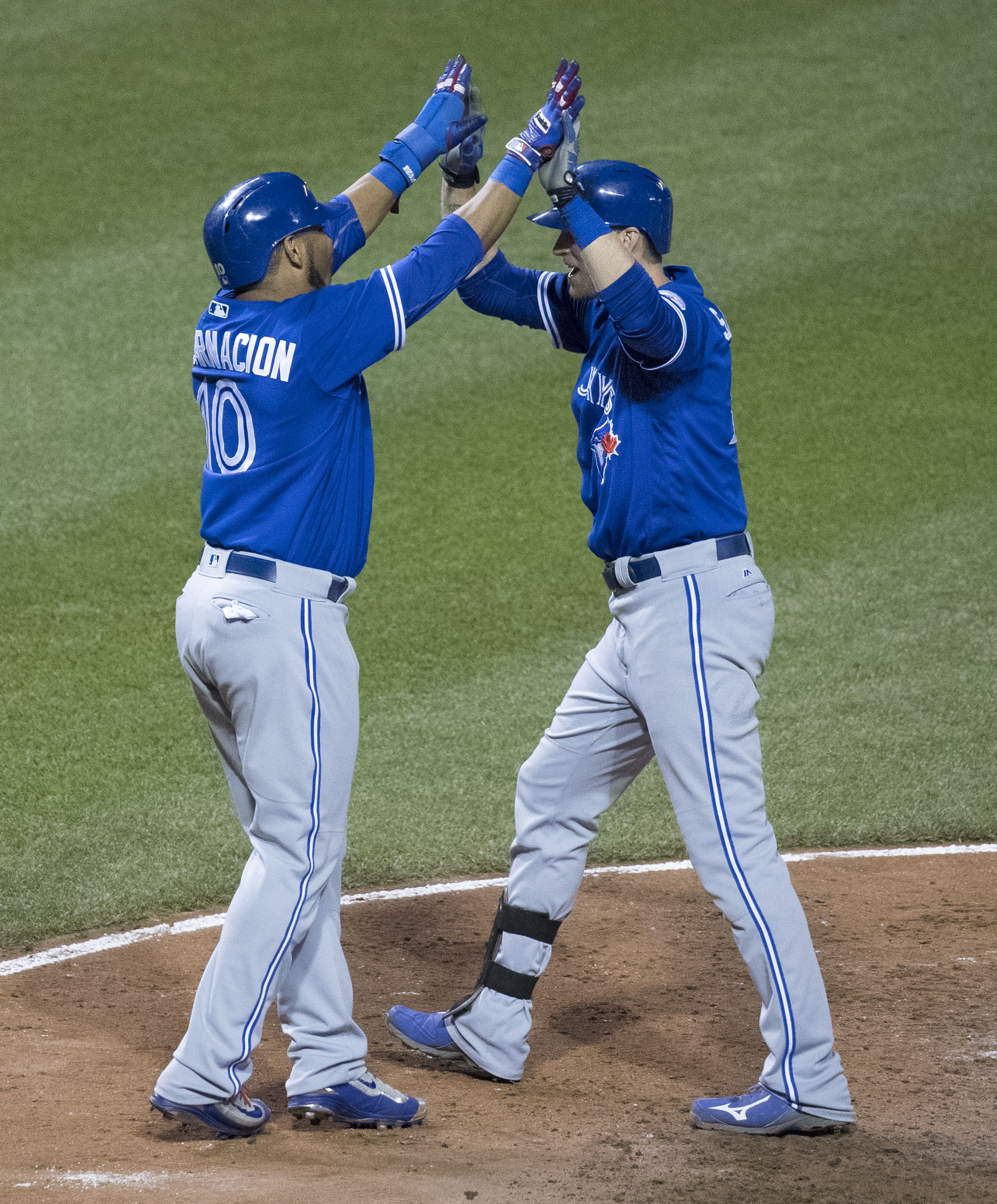
Edwin Encarnación (left) and Michael Saunders of the Toronto Blue Jays executing a two-handed high five in 2016

If one initiates a high five (or any variation thereof) by offering a hand(s), and no reciprocal hand appears to consummate the gesture, the initiator is said to have been "left hanging". This could be interpreted as an insult, friendly joke or form of enlightenment, depending on the context of its use.

Another variation is the "self high five." The action consists of raising one hand, generally the right hand, and tagging it with the other. It was often used by professional wrestler Diamond Dallas Page as part of his persona, such as in "Self High Five," his theme song in World Championship Wrestling (WCW). A variation of this variation was explored by Turkish artist Deniz Ozuygur who built a "Self High-five Machine," which was exhibited in New York City in 2010. It is a robotic arm that spins in circles striking another robotic arm, both of which are rubber casts of Ozuygur's own arms.

A hand grab is when one or both parties grab and hold, sometimes even shaking around the opposing parties hand while still up high. The variation can be used to indicate friendship and/or personal swagger. A two-handed high five is, as the name suggests, the same as a high five but two handed. A back end is when a normal high is followed through by swinging the arms around to slap together down low. Some will pass through a gauntlet while giving two hand high fives through a line of people.

=== Too slow ===
The "too slow" variation is a sequence of high five and low five, often accompanied by a rhyme such as "Up High. Down Low ..." During the down low sequence, the initiator will surprise the counter-party by pulling their hand back at the last moment, tricking the other person into swiping at empty air, completing the rhyme with "Too slow!" There are variations on this theme, with additions of "to the side" and other hand positions for the partner to contact the initiator's hand.

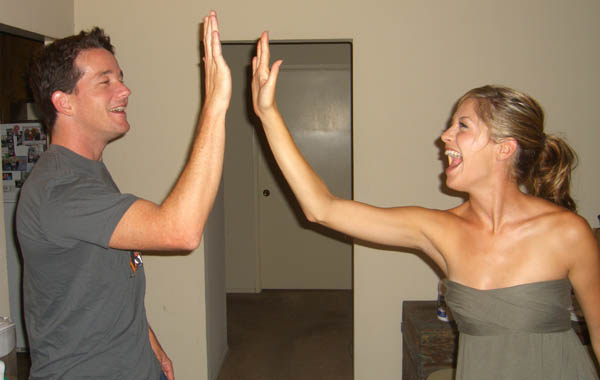
"Up high."

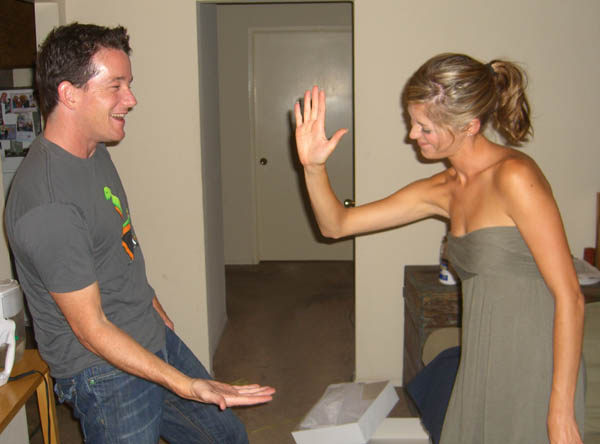
"Down low."

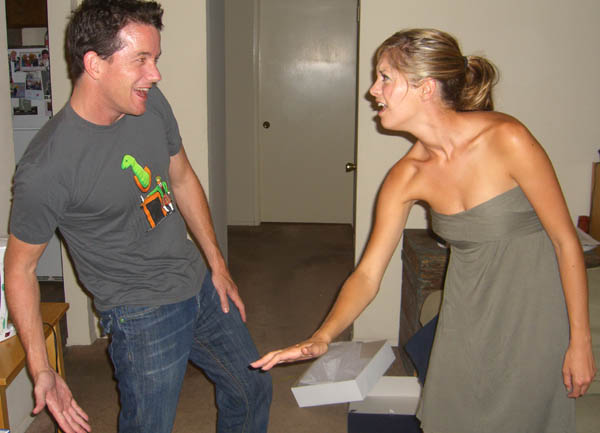
Victim misses.

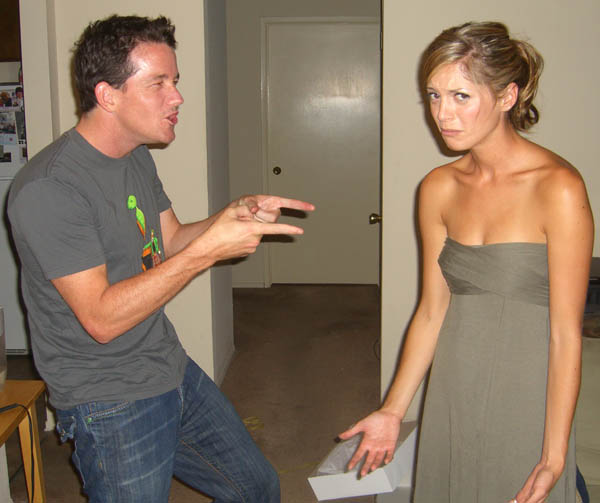
"Too slow!" (with optional finger-guns)

The origin of the too slow variation has not been established, but the earliest documented instance is a 1982 news article in the Evansville Courier & Press. A robot named Fubar interacted with customers: "'Gimme three brother' he tells a shopper as he extends a golden hand with that many fingers. Then with a rapid-fire retort he confuses the greeter with 'Take It back! Up high! Down low! Too slow!'" Other notable sources have made reference to it; for example a 1983 journal is quoted as saying, "Whether we hammer, or hoe, whoop or holler, as they say, slap five up high, down low, you're too slow, we do it with the rhythmic motif that leads to harmony." The title song for Lay on Five, a BBC children's television programme broadcast in 1985–86 featuring Floella Benjamin, ended "..too slow to Lay on Five." The too slow variation is in the 1987 film The Principal in a scene where Principal Rick Latimer (James Belushi) does it to Arturo Diego (Jacob Vargas). In the New York Times archives, the earliest reference is from 1993 when Arnold Schwarzenegger did it with the son of a film-crew member while on the set of Last Action Hero, saying: "Let's have five. Five high. Five low," at which point Schwarzenegger pulled his hand away saying "Too slow." The boy reportedly laughed. Schwarzenegger did it originally in the 1991 film Terminator 2: Judgment Day, when John Connor (Edward Furlong) teaches the Terminator (Schwarzenegger) to "Gimme five. Up high, down low, too slow." In 2008, They Might Be Giants released the song "High Five!" on an album for children titled Here Come the 123s, with lyrics "High five! Low five! Slap me five! Down low! Too slow!," a gesture described in the song as "old school" a slang term usually meaning something from a prior generation.

The rhyme bears a striking resemblance to a very old work song, possibly medieval, used by blacksmiths to teach apprentices how to best operate a bellows in a way that maximized its efficiency by opening it fully and quickly, while closing it slowly. The didactic rhyme is "Up high. Down low. Up quick. Down slow; And that's the way to blow."

=== Air five ===
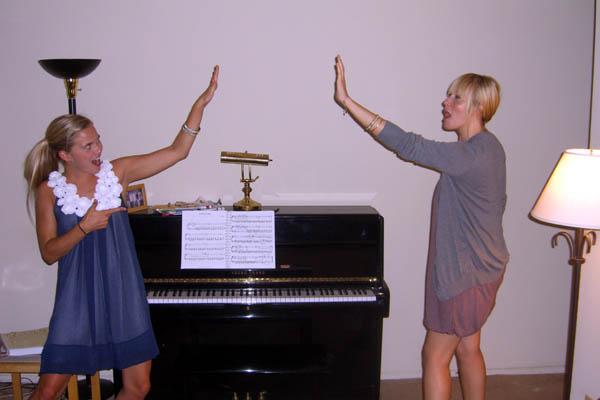
Two women engaging in an air five

An air five is a variation where the hands of the participants never actually touch, needing only line of sight to make the gesture. It has an advantage for participants who are otherwise too far apart to achieve physical contact at the moment of the gesture. The participants may simply pretend to high five, or add an imitation sound of hand slapping. Also known as the wi-five, a mix of "wireless" and "high five" with a pun on Wi-Fi, a wireless computer technology.

== Celebrations ==
National High Five Day is a project to give out high fives and is typically held on the third Thursday in April. According to the National High Five Project, the event began in 2002 at the University of Virginia after a group of students set up a booth and gave out high-fives and lemonade. The project has held events where participants take part in a "high-five-a-thon" to raise funds for charity.

== Human health ==
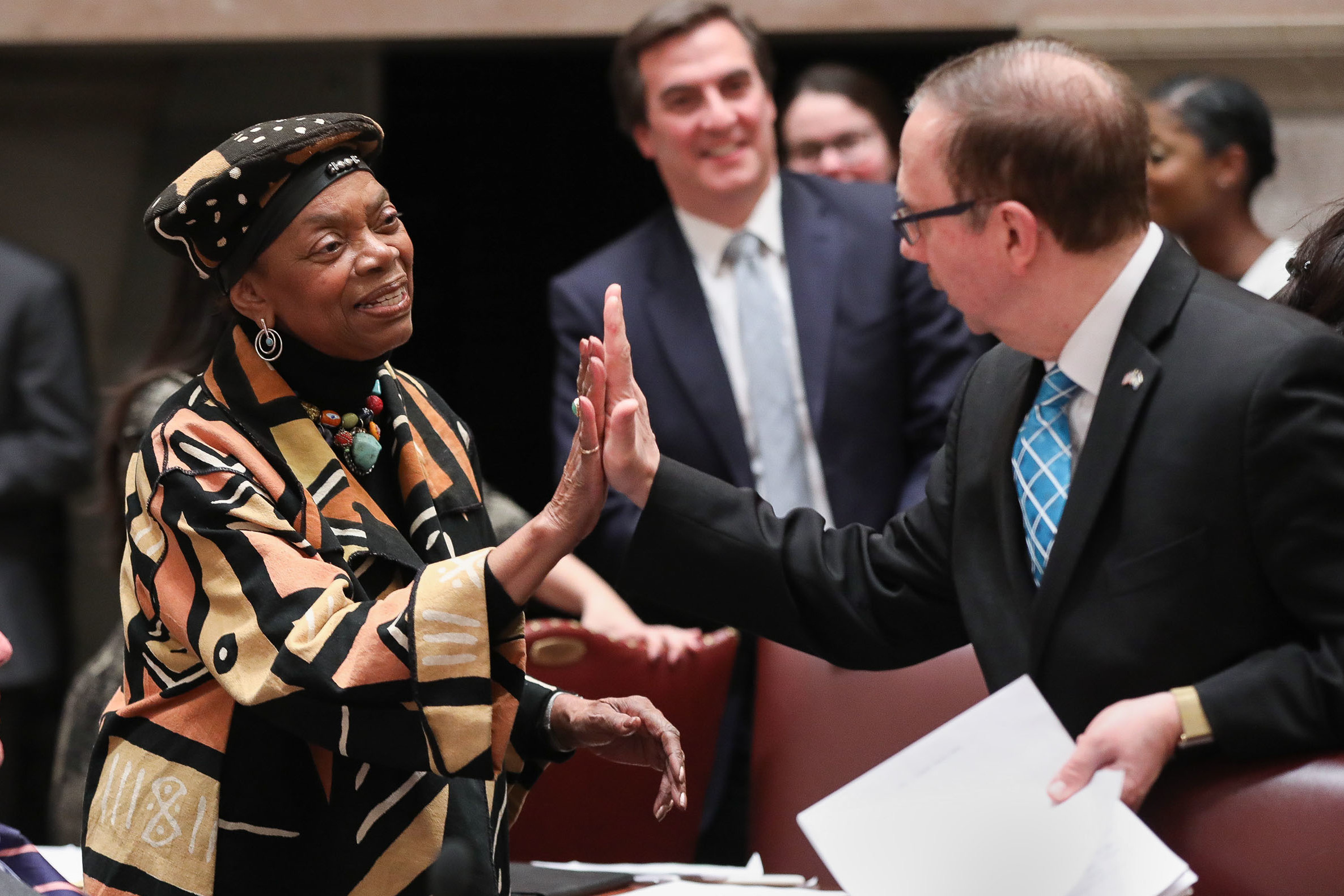
New York State Senators Velmanette Montgomery and Joe Griffo high-five each other in the senate chamber.

A 2014 medical study found that fist bumps and high fives spread fewer germs than handshakes.

During the COVID-19 pandemic, the high-five was "singled out, stigmatized and fraught with anxiety", being replaced by gestures such as knocking elbows, tapping forearms, or clicking cleats. For example, college conferences banned the high-five; the Yankees informally resolved to bump elbows instead of slapping hands; the Minnesota Twins banned physical contact with fans. Outside of sports, individuals reported avoiding the high-five in their daily lives. Dusty Baker, the presumed originator of the gesture, advocated for contactless high-fives.
