= The Number Painter =

Fictional character

The Number Painter, also known as The Mad Painter, was the title character of a series of comedy live-action short films produced for the children's television program Sesame Street. This series of slapstick films — each one ran anywhere from one minute to 90 seconds — were used to teach children number recognition, including appearance and symbolic representation of Arabic numerals, and how the number is drawn. As such, "The Number Painter" contrasted with the show's other animated and live-action number-related skits, where the primary focus was on counting.

There were ten "Number Painter" skits produced in the series, one each for the numbers 2 through 11. The number 1 skit was not produced, since it was not featured in individual Sesame Street segments during the era when the films were produced and aired. Although the numbers showcased up to 12 in this same era, the number 12 film was not produced either, with the number 11 being the last segment in the "Number Painter" series.

The title character and protagonist in these movies, portrayed by Paul Benedict, was an eccentric character who enjoys painting numbers in a series of public and private locations. His outfit consists of a black-and-white striped shirt, gray pants held up with suspenders, black Chuck Taylor Converse sneakers, and a paint-splattered smock, topped with a black bowler hat. He carries a can of paint and a brush, along with a cut-out of the number he intends to paint. The Painter never spoke on-camera, although his thoughts were heard using voice over.

The films were produced in 1971, and the first film in the series — that for the number 2 — aired on February 23, 1972. Given Sesame Street's format of replaying and recycling its vignettes, the Painter skits continued to be rebroadcast into the 1980s, concurrent with Benedict going on to be a regular in the sitcom The Jeffersons and recurring co-star Stockard Channing launching a film and TV career. Robert Dennis composed the jaunty piano score in each of the segments. Eliot Noyes Jr. directed and produced the series.

== Skit format ==
The skits in each of the films followed the same basic format. The Painter announces that he is going to paint a specific number, all while scouting out a suitable location to engage in said activity; he would then pull a model of that number from his smock to emphasize its shape to the viewers.

Any one of a number of objects were fair game to the Painter, including sailboat sails, slices of bread, umbrellas, rubber balls, elevator doors, stools, window panes, streets, and even a bald man's head. At one point (in the #8 film), the Painter's work became the subject of a dramatic, large-font newspaper headline ("PAINTER STRIKES AGAIN!"). Several of the films ended with the Painter having to deal with people who were upset over his activities.

== Supporting characters ==
=== Mac ===
Portrayed by Broadway actor Jerome Raphael, Mac was the most frequent target of the Number Painter's antics. He appeared in seven of the skits, including the owner of a boat (#2), a baker (#6), a passenger in an elevator (#7), an unassuming homeowner enjoying a lazy afternoon in his swimming pool (#8), an operator of a street-cleaning truck (#9), and a janitor (#10 and 11). Usually, Mac managed to foil—either deliberately or unwittingly—the Painter's work.

=== The Woman ===
Stockard Channing — who went on to greater fame in Grease and The West Wing—appeared in four of the sketches, playing the woman at the picnic (#3); the woman holding the umbrella (#4); the woman inside the elevator having her plastic handbag painted on (#7); and, finally, the doctor saying "Next" to her patients (#11).

== Sketch list ==
Number	Overview
2 (December 30, 1972)	The Painter is at a marina where, after rejecting two dock poles, he chooses someone's sail to paint his 2, then quickly flees in a rowboat from the sailboat's irate owner.
3 (February 16, 1972)	The Painter meets a woman (played by Stockard Channing) who is enjoying a picnic lunch alone at a park. The Painter paints the number on slices of bread using condiments — first ketchup, then mustard, and finally mayonnaise — but the woman grabs each slice to assemble a large Dagwood sandwich before he can admire his work. The woman finally devours the sandwich; time-lapse filming techniques were used to create the comic effect. Annoyed, the painter begins chewing on his model 3. (One of two films in which the painter does not use paint.)
4 (February 17, 1972)	Walking down the street, The Painter encounters a woman in rain gear carrying an open umbrella, asking where the rain is. While she is not looking, the Painter goes about his work. Just as the woman inspects the umbrella to see what The Painter had done, both are doused with a sudden deluge of water.
5 (February 18, 1972)	At the zoo, The Painter walks into a cage that appears to be empty. Thinking nobody is around, he finds a yellow ball and begins his work. Just as he is finishing, the cage's inhabitant, a gorilla, interrupts The Painter's work. The Painter nervously hands the brush to the gorilla, who finishes the 5. The two give each other a low five as the skit ends.
6 (February 4, 1972)	The Painter walks into a bakery, where a baker is trying to finish icing a birthday cake. The baker leaves the area briefly, giving The Painter enough time to grab one of the icing tools to draw the number 6. When the baker returns and sees what has been done to the cake, he cuts a slice and offers it to The Painter in an apparent gesture of thanks. Before The Painter can take a bite, the baker shoves the rest of the cake in his face, then takes the slice for himself. (The other film in which the painter does not use paint, and the only one in which he does not use a brush.)
7 (January 6, 1972)	The Painter tries to paint a 7 on the elevator door of a department store, but winds up painting the number on a shopping bag and purse carried by some customers, both of whom disappear behind the door before he can admire his work. The third customer he encounters is a football player in full uniform whose jersey has a 7 on it. Not needing to paint it, he compares his 7 to the football player's then enters the elevator with him. (This is the only one where the painter paints with his left hand.)
8 (January 24, 1972)	The Painter pops up from under the water of a backyard swimming pool, where Mac, the owner, is trying to enjoy a relaxing afternoon while reading the newspaper headline of the Painter's previous antics in the #6 film. The Painter decides that the man's bald head is the perfect place to paint his 8. When the man realizes what The Painter has done, he goes after his antagonist to demand an explanation. The ensuing chase scene uses fast-motion photography for comic effect.
9 (February 9, 1972)	The Painter decides to paint his 9 on the street, but after doing so, a street cleaner truck driven by Mac comes by and its water jet wrecks his beautiful creation.
10 (January 26, 1972)	The Painter decides to paint his 10 on the seat of a bar stool in the room he's in. As he shows it off, the janitor comes in and gestures for him to put the stool down. The man sits on the stool and eats a banana, but when he stands up, he is unaware that the wet paint has transferred onto his coveralls. (This is the one where the man's name is shown to be "Mac", as it says on the back of his coveralls.)
11 (January 27, 1972)	The Painter comes into the waiting room of a doctor's office and decides that the window of the door leading into the office would be a perfect place to paint the number 11, but is interrupted by the other patients going into the examining rooms. After The Painter finally does his work, the janitor (Mac) comes in and washes off the 11 from the window, and the exasperated doctor (Channing) yanks The Painter into the office. (This one, and #7 are the only two to feature both the man and the woman.)
