= The Stockard Channing Show =

- DVD Cover
- Genre: Sitcom
- Created by: Nick Arnold; Eric Cohen (developed by Aaron Ruben)
- Starring: Stockard Channing; Ron Silver; Sydney Goldsmith; Max Showalter; Bruce Baum; Jack Somack
- Theme music composer: Delaney Bramlett
- Opening theme: "Brand New Life"
- Country of origin: United States
- Original language: English
- No. of seasons: 1
- No. of episodes: 13

Production
- Camera setup: Multi-camera
- Running time: 30 minutes
- Production company: Little Bear Productions

Original release
- Network: CBS
- Release: March 24 – July 12, 1980

Related
- Stockard Channing in Just Friends

The Stockard Channing Show is an American sitcom television series starring Stockard Channing, Ron Silver, Sydney Goldsmith, Max Showalter and Jack Somack.

The show first aired on CBS from March 24 to July 12, 1980, with 13 episodes produced. The series aired at 8:30 P.M. ET, along with WKRP in Cincinnati, M*A*S*H and Flo on the Monday night lineup. After the show ended, Channing would not star in another sitcom until Out of Practice in 2005.

== Cast ==
- Stockard Channing as Susan Goodenow
- Ron Silver as Brad Gabriel
- Sydney Goldsmith as Earline Cunningham
- Max Showalter as Gus Clyde
- Jack Somack as Mr. Kramer
- Bruce Baum as Alf Serenity

== Plot ==
Susan Goodenow (Channing) was a recent divorcee whose ditzy friend/neighbor Earline got her a job working as a consumer reporter for the local Los Angeles TV show The Big Rip-Off. Headlining the show was Brad Gabriel (Ron Silver) a tightly-wound journalist who was convinced everything was toxic and bad. Flamboyant Gus Clyde (Max Showalter), a former Broadway entertainer, was the station owner; Alf (Bruce Baum) was a burnout hippie who landed a job as a security guard at the station after the health food store he owned was targeted by The Big Rip-Off; and Mr. Kramer (Jack Somack) was Susan's landlord. Plots often revolved around Susan's attempts to expose corporations who were swindling consumers, which afforded Channing plenty of opportunities to don various disguises and personas.

== Production ==
After wowing audiences in Grease and The Cheap Detective, CBS sets their sights on making Stockard Channing into a TV star. Channing and her then-husband, producer David Debin, were offered ownership and creative control of a movie and television series. The results were the 1979 made-for-TV movie Silent Victory: The Kitty O'Neil Story and series Stockard Channing in Just Friends. Just Friends was moderately successful and was never officially canceled, but it didn't secure a slot on the fall schedule.

In March 1980, Channing returned in The Stockard Channing Show, which like Just Friends debuted as a mid-season replacement. "I felt last year I became the workhorse, and had to push the show along," Channing told the Associated Press in 1980. "In doing this season, I didn't feel I desperately had to do anything to keep the show moving." Although it was a completely different show, there was certainly familiar ground, beginning with the opening theme song (the same on both series). Stockard's character was again named Susan (Susan was Channing's legal first name; her last name in the series was "Goodenow" as opposed to "Hughes" in the previous) and her apartment was simply redressed. In Just Friends, Susan was in a failing marriage; for this series, she is fully divorced. Sydney Goldsmith was retained as Susan's flighty friend/neighbor, now renamed Earline. In addition to the on-screen similarities, many crew members from Just Friends were also retained.

== Episodes ==
No.	Title	Original release date
1	"A Funny Thing Happened on the Way to the Unemployment Office"	March 24, 1980
Susan lands a job working for consumer reporter Brad Gabriel. For her first assignment she goes undercover as an Argentinian socialite to expose a corrupt dentist.
2	"Catch a Falling Star"	March 31, 1980
Susan poses as a young Texan actress to expose a shady talent agency, but unwittingly falls for their con.
3	"Advise and Consume"	April 7, 1980
When Susan's former classmate Spencer Farrell (Granville Van Dusen), who is now a politician, arrives she expects to be swept off her feet, but it's Brad who falls victim to Spencer's charms.
4	"A No. 3 with Sprouts to Go, Hold the Ptomaine"	April 14, 1980
Susan tries to promote Mr. Kramer's new felafel business, but Brad becomes convinced the felafels gave him food poisoning.
5	"You Can't Quit Me, I'm Fired"	April 21, 1980
Just as Susan is feeling burnt-out at work, she befriends a free-spirited new neighbor (Maureen Arthur) whom the other tenants suspect is a prostitute.
6	"Life Begins at 30"	April 27, 1980
Susan gets depressed on her 30th birthday and decides to go out and party with Wendy (Wendie Jo Sperber), a plucky 20-year-old intern.
7	"The Threat"	April 28, 1980
Brad becomes such a nervous wreck after receiving a death threat that he begins popping Valium.
8	"Exclusive: Love Finds Brad Gabriel"	June 7, 1980
After Brad falls for a beautiful reporter, Susan discovers she works for The National Smarm.
9	"Susan's Big Break"	June 14, 1980
Susan's favorable test of Stuck-It Glue goes so well that she ultimately pushes Brad out of the TV show.
10	"Puppy Love"	June 21, 1980
When Gus dumps his 15-year-old nephew on Susan, the boy ends up falling for her.
11	"Texas Bob and The Consumer Ranch Gang"	June 28, 1980
Susan befriends her childhood matinee idol (Arch Johnson), but is forced to expose the car dealership that he owns.
12	"Punt, Pass and Kick"	July 5, 1980
Gus hires a chauvinistic football player (Hunter von Leer) who makes a play for Susan.
13	"Ask Gratis Gus"	July 12, 1980
Susan makes the mistake of agreeing to look at the overlong manuscript for Gus's autobiography.

== DVD release ==
The complete series was released on DVD in 2006 by the Canadian company Visual Entertainment paired with 10 of the 13 episodes of Channing's previous series, Stockard Channing in Just Friends. The first episode of The Stockard Channing Show appears at the end of the first disc.
