= List of awards and nominations received by Stockard Channing =

Stockard Channing awards
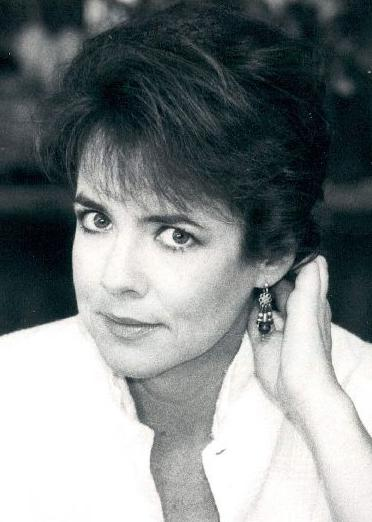
- Channing in 1984
Totals
Award	Wins	Nominations
Academy Awards	0	1
AFI Awards	0	1
American Theater Hall of Fame	1	1
Blockbuster Entertainment Awards	2	2
CableACE Awards	1	2
CFCA Awards	0	1
Drama Desk Awards	1	7
Drama League Awards	1	1
Emmy Awards	3	14
FIS Awards	0	1
GLAAD Media Awards	1	1
Golden Apple Awards	0	1
Golden Globes	0	3
LFCC Awards	1	1
NBR Awards	1	1
NSFC Awards	0	1
OCC Awards	0	1
People's Choice Awards	1	1
SFFCC Awards	0	1
Satellite Awards	0	2
SAG Awards	2	11
TV Guide Awards	0	1
Tony Awards	1	7
WIFTI Awards	1	1
Awards won	17
Nominations	64

The list of awards and nominations received by Stockard Channing includes three Emmy Awards (out of fourteen nominations), two Screen Actors Guild Awards (out of eleven nominations), one Drama Desk Award (out of seven nominations), as well one Tony Award (out of seven nominations). Among others, she has also won four Online Film & Television Association Awards (out of seven nominations), two Blockbuster Entertainment Awards, a CableACE Award, a Drama League Award, a GLAAD Media Award, a London Film Critics' Circle Award, a National Board of Review Award, a People's Choice Award, and a Lucy Award. In 2003, Channing was inducted into the American Theater Hall of Fame.

An Academy Awards-nominee, she has also received three nominations for Golden Globe Awards, two nominations for Satellite Awards, one nomination from American Film Institute, one nomination from Chicago Film Critics Association, also one nomination from National Society of Film Critics and San Francisco Film Critics Circle, one Golden Apple Award-nomination, one Film Independent Spirit Award-nomination, one Outer Critics Circle Award-nomination and one TV Guide Award-nomination. As of September 2014, Channing has accumulated 21 awards out of 71 nominations.

== Film and television awards ==
=== Academy Awards ===
Year	Nominated work	Category	Result
1993	Six Degrees of Separation	Best Actress	Nominated

=== American Film Institute Awards ===
Year	Nominated work	Category	Result
2001	The Business of Strangers	Actor of the Year - Female - Movies	Nominated

=== Blockbuster Entertainment Awards ===
Year	Nominated work	Category	Result
1997	Up Close & Personal	Favorite Supporting Actress - Romance	Won
1999	Practical Magic	Favorite Supporting Actress - Comedy/Romance	Won

=== CableACE Awards ===
Year	Nominated work	Category	Result
1989	Tidy Endings	Actress in a Dramatic or Theatrical Special	Nominated
1995	Road to Avonlea	Actress in a Dramatic Series	Won

=== Chicago Film Critics Association Awards ===
Year	Nominated work	Category	Result
1993	Six Degrees of Separation	Best Actress	Nominated

=== Emmy Awards ===
Year	Nominated work	Category	Result
Daytime Emmy Awards
2005	Jack	Outstanding Performer in a Children/Youth/Family Special	Won
Primetime Emmy Awards
1988	Echoes in the Darkness	Outstanding Supporting Actress in a Limited or Anthology Series or Movie	Nominated
1990	Perfect Witness	Outstanding Supporting Actress in a Limited or Anthology Series or Movie	Nominated
1994	Road to Avonlea	Outstanding Guest Actress in a Drama Series	Nominated
1997	An Unexpected Family	Outstanding Lead Actress in a Limited or Anthology Series or Movie	Nominated
1999	The Baby Dance	Outstanding Lead Actress in a Limited or Anthology Series or Movie	Nominated
2000	The West Wing	Outstanding Supporting Actress in a Drama Series	Nominated
2001	The West Wing	Outstanding Supporting Actress in a Drama Series	Nominated
2002	The West Wing	Outstanding Supporting Actress in a Drama Series	Won
2002	The Matthew Shepard Story	Outstanding Supporting Actress in a Limited or Anthology Series or Movie	Won
2003	The West Wing	Outstanding Supporting Actress in a Drama Series	Nominated
2004	The West Wing	Outstanding Supporting Actress in a Drama Series	Nominated
2005	The West Wing	Outstanding Supporting Actress in a Drama Series	Nominated
2006	Out of Practice	Outstanding Lead Actress in a Comedy Series	Nominated

=== Film Independent Spirit Awards ===
Year	Nominated work	Category	Result
1998	The Baby Dance	Best Supporting Female	Nominated

=== GLAAD Media Awards ===
Year	Nominated work	Category	Result
2003	Herself	Golden Gate Award	Won

=== Golden Apple Awards ===
Year	Nominated work	Category	Result
1975	Herself	Female New Star of the Year	Nominated

=== Golden Globe Awards ===
Year	Nominated work	Category	Result
1975	The Fortune	New Star of the Year – Actress	Nominated
1993	Six Degrees of Separation	Best Actress in a Motion Picture – Musical or Comedy	Nominated
1998	The Baby Dance	Best Actress – Miniseries or Television Film	Nominated

=== London Film Critics' Circle Awards ===
Year	Nominated work	Category	Result
2002	The Business of Strangers	Actress of the Year	Won

=== National Board of Review Awards ===
Year	Nominated work	Category	Result
1996	The First Wives Club	Best Acting by an Ensemble	Won

=== National Society of Film Critics Awards ===
Year	Nominated work	Category	Result
1993	Six Degrees of Separation	Best Actress	3rd Place

=== People's Choice Awards ===
Year	Nominated work	Category	Result
1979	Grease	Favorite Motion Picture Supporting Actress	Won

=== San Francisco International Film Festival Awards ===
Year	Nominated work	Category	Result
2001	Herself	Peter J. Owens Award	Nominated

=== Satellite Awards ===
Year	Nominated work	Category	Result
1996	Moll Flanders	Best Supporting Actress – Motion Picture	Nominated
2002	The Matthew Shepard Story	Best Actress – Miniseries or Television Film	Nominated

=== Screen Actors Guild Awards ===
Year	Nominated work	Category	Result
1995	Smoke	Outstanding Female Actor in a Supporting Role	Nominated
1996	An Unexpected Family	Outstanding Female Actor in a Miniseries or Television Movie	Nominated
1998	The Baby Dance	Outstanding Female Actor in a Miniseries or Television Movie	Nominated
2000	The Truth About Jane	Outstanding Female Actor in a Miniseries or Television Movie	Nominated
2001	The West Wing	Outstanding Female Actor in a Drama Series	Nominated
2001	The West Wing	Outstanding Ensemble in a Drama Series	Won
2002	The West Wing	Outstanding Ensemble in a Drama Series	Nominated
2002	The Matthew Shepard Story	Outstanding Female Actor in a Miniseries or Television Movie	Won
2003	The West Wing	Outstanding Female Actor in a Drama Series	Nominated
2003	The West Wing	Outstanding Ensemble in a Drama Series	Nominated
2004	The West Wing	Outstanding Ensemble in a Drama Series	Nominated

=== TV Guide Awards ===
Year	Nominated work	Category	Result
2001	The West Wing	Supporting Actress of the Year in a Drama Series	Nominated

=== Women in Film and Television International Awards ===
Year	Nominated work	Category	Result
2003	Herself	Lucy Award	Won

== Theatre awards ==
=== American Theater Hall of Fame ===
Year	Nominated work	Category	Result
2002	Herself	Theater Hall of Fame	Won

=== Drama Desk Awards ===
Year	Nominated work	Category	Result
1985	A Day in the Death of Joe Egg	Outstanding Actress in a Play	Nominated
1986	The House of Blue Leaves	Outstanding Actress in a Play	Nominated
1988	Woman in Mind	Outstanding Actress in a Play	Won
1991	Six Degrees of Separation	Outstanding Actress in a Play	Nominated
1995	Hapgood	Outstanding Actress in a Play	Nominated
2009	Pal Joey	Outstanding Actress in a Musical	Nominated
2011	Other Desert Cities	Outstanding Actress in a Play	Nominated

=== Drama League Awards ===
Year	Nominated work	Category	Result
1991	Six Degrees of Separation	Distinguished Performance Award (aka Delia Austrian Medal)	Won

=== Outer Critics Circle Awards ===
Year	Nominated work	Category	Result
1991	Six Degrees of Separation	Best Actress – Play	Nominated

=== Tony Awards ===
Year	Nominated work	Category	Result
1985	A Day in the Death of Joe Egg	Best Actress in a Play	Won
1986	The House of Blue Leaves	Best Featured Actress in a Play	Nominated
1991	Six Degrees of Separation	Best Actress in a Play	Nominated
1992	Four Baboons Adoring the Sun	Best Actress in a Play	Nominated
1999	The Lion in Winter	Best Actress in a Play	Nominated
2009	Pal Joey	Best Actress in a Musical	Nominated
2012	Other Desert Cities	Best Actress in a Play	Nominated

== Other Awards ==
=== Grammy Awards ===
Year	Nominated work	Category	Result
1978	Grease (Original Soundtrack) (Album)	Album of the Year	Nominated

== See also ==
- Stockard Channing on stage and screen
