= The Last Temptation of Krust =

- The Simpsons episode
- Episode no.: Season 9 Episode 15
- Directed by: Mike B. Anderson
- Written by: Donick Cary
- Production code: 5F10
- Original air date: February 22, 1998

Guest appearances
- Jay Leno, Bruce Baum, Janeane Garofalo, Bobcat Goldthwait, Hank Williams Jr. and Steven Wright as themselves

Episode features
- Chalkboard gag: "Pain is not the cleanser"
- Couch gag: The family run in, with their behinds on fire and douse themselves on the waterlogged couch.
- Commentary: Matt Groening; Mike Scully; Ron Hauge; Donick Cary; Yeardley Smith; Mike B. Anderson; Jay Leno

Episode chronology
← Previous "Das Bus"	Next → "Dumbbell Indemnity"
- The Simpsons season 9

"The Last Temptation of Krust" is the fifteenth episode of the ninth season of the American animated television series The Simpsons. It first aired on Fox in the United States on February 22, 1998. It was written by Donick Cary and directed by Mike B. Anderson. Comedian Jay Leno makes a guest appearance. In the episode, Bart convinces Krusty the Clown to appear at a comedy festival organized by Jay Leno, but Krusty's old material does not go over well with the audience and he receives bad reviews. He briefly retires from comedy but returns with a new, better-received gimmick. He soon returns to his old ways, selling out to a motor-vehicle company.

The production team's decision to write an episode about stand-up comedy was influenced by comedy festivals. The writing staff initially had trouble getting Krusty's offensive bad jokes through network censors, but convinced them this was simply a way to emphasize his old and dated comedic material. The "Canyonero" sequence was modeled after Ford commercials and was given its own segment at the end of the episode because the production staff liked it so much.

The episode was highlighted by USA Today in a review of The Simpsons' ninth season and received positive reviews in The Washington Times, the Evening Herald, and in books on The Simpsons.

== Plot ==
Krusty the Clown is persuaded by Bart Simpson to appear at a comedy festival organized by Jay Leno. Krusty's outdated and offensive material fails to impress the audience when compared with the trendier comedians also appearing. Discouraged by a negative review of his act, Krusty goes on a bender and passes out on Ned Flanders' lawn. While recovering in Bart's memorabilia-covered room, Krusty realizes that he should have spent more time honing his act rather than selling out, and he enlists Bart and Leno's aid. However, his attempts at observational humor fall flat with the Simpson family. Krusty holds a press conference to announce his retirement and in short order launches into a bitter tirade against modern-day comedians. The audience finds Krusty's rant hysterically funny and he subsequently announces his return to comedy.

Krusty is inspired to return to doing low-key events, where he structures a new image for himself as a stand-up comedian who tells the truth, criticizes commercialism, and refuses to sell out to corporate America. He also changes his appearance, sporting a dark sweater and tying his hair in a ponytail. Observing his newfound popularity, two marketing executives try to persuade Krusty to endorse a new sport utility vehicle called the Canyonero. Although he tries to resist, he eventually succumbs to the lure of money. After promoting the Canyonero at a comedy performance in Moe's Tavern, he is booed off stage by the patrons. He finally admits to himself that comedy is not in his blood and selling out is. The episode ends with an extended advertisement for the Canyonero, as Krusty and Bart leave Moe Szyslak's tavern in Krusty's new SUV.

== Production ==
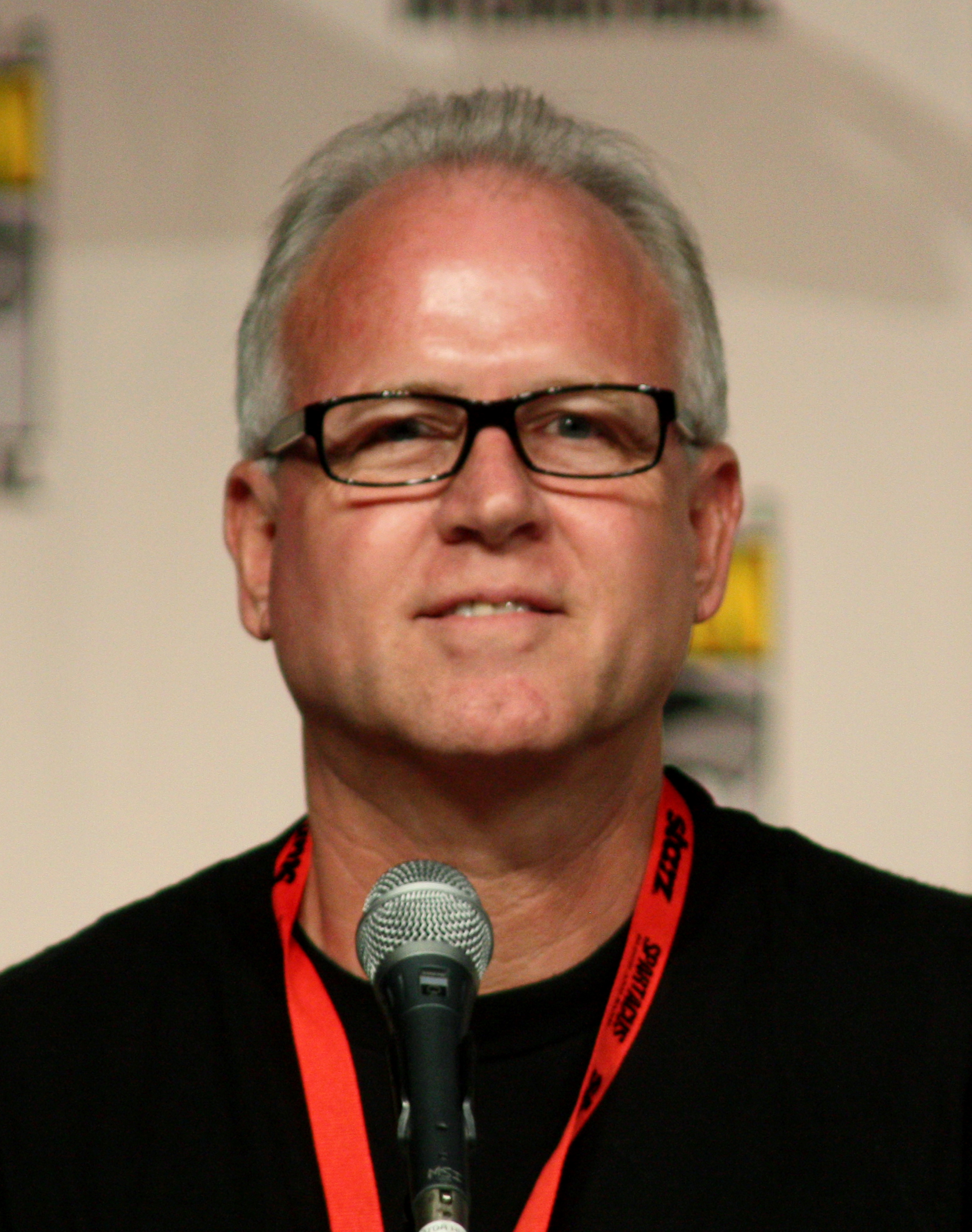
Mike B. Anderson directed the episode.

In the DVD commentary for The Simpsons' ninth season, writer Donick Cary stated that the inspiration for the idea of an episode about stand-up comedy came out of comedy festivals at the time. Executive producer Mike Scully said that the writers had difficulty getting Krusty's offensive bad jokes through the network censors. The stereotypical jokes were allowed because the writers convinced the network censors that viewers would understand it was simply emphasizing Krusty's dated comedic material.

Mike B. Anderson stated that at least three different acts of material were written and animated for Krusty's comeback stand-up appearance at Moe's Tavern. It was not until the editing process that the material used was decided upon. The episode was still being animated three weeks before it was due to air and the production process moved frantically shortly before completion. The Canyonero sequence was originally planned to be displayed during the closing credits. The production team liked the scene so much that they did not want it to be obscured by the credits and gave it its own segment at the end of the episode.

== Cultural references ==
The episode title is a reference to the controversial novel (and later film) The Last Temptation of Christ. In addition to Jay Leno, other real-life comedians who portrayed themselves in the episode are Steven Wright, Janeane Garofalo, Bobcat Goldthwait, and Bruce Baum, whose appearance helped increase his popularity. Garofalo would return to guest star again as herself in the season 23 episode "The Ten-Per-Cent Solution". Krusty's "Krustylu Studios" is a spoof on the company Desilu studios, set up by Lucille Ball and her husband Desi Arnaz, where the series Star Trek was once filmed. During Krusty's "bender to end all benders" montage, he is seen drinking out of and vomiting into the Stanley Cup. The National Hockey League sent a letter regarding this scene. Mike Scully described it as a "kind of a cease and desist", but the production staff decided not to cut the scene from the episode. (Of note, Fox was a national television rightsholder for NHL games at the time this episode originally aired.) The poem recited by Krusty when he announces his retirement from comedy is "To an Athlete Dying Young" by A. E. Housman. Krusty attends the coffee shop Java the Hut, a reference to the Star Wars character Jabba the Hutt. Additionally, Krusty's anti-commercialism and anti-corporate stances, along with styling his hair in a ponytail, is a reference to comedian George Carlin who styled his hair the same way later in his career and often had anti-capitalist, anti-consumerist and anti-commercialist overtones in his performance.

=== Canyonero ===
The "Canyonero" song and visual sequence was modeled after Ford commercials. The sequence is a parody of a commercial for a sport utility vehicle and Hank Williams Jr. sings a song about the Canyonero accompanied by country guitar music and whip cracks. The song "Canyonero" closely resembles the theme to the 1960s television series Rawhide. This episode was the first appearance of the Canyonero, which again appeared in the season 10 episode "Marge Simpson in: 'Screaming Yellow Honkers'". The "Canyonero" song is included on the 1999 soundtrack album Go Simpsonic with The Simpsons.

Two years later, Ford released the Super Duty-based Ford Excursion, the largest and heaviest SUV ever until the electric GMC Hummer SUV and pickup.

Chris Turner wrote positively of the Canyonero spoof piece in Planet Simpson: How a Cartoon Masterpiece Defined a Generation, calling it "a brilliant parody of an SUV ad".

In an article in the journal Environmental Politics, Steve Vanderheiden commented that the Canyonero reflected an "anti-SUV" stance by The Simpsons. Vanderheiden wrote: "Even the popular animated television series 'The Simpsons' joined the anti-SUV fray in 1998, featuring a mammoth vehicle called the 'Canyonero' (marketed with the jingle: 'Twelve yards long, two lanes wide/Sixty-five tons of American pride!'), which promised to help the family transcend its mundane station-wagon existence but instead brought only misery."

The term "Canyonero" has since been used in the news media to refer critically to large trucks and SUVs.

In an article in the San Francisco Chronicle about SUV owners, Vicki Haddock wrote "SUV owners have become something of a punch line, succinctly captured in a "Simpsons" parody touting the apocryphal Canyonero".

In a 2006 article, Seth Jayson of The Motley Fool compared the wording in a Ford advertisement myFord Owner Magazine to this episode, writing: "the unholiest of unholies is the writing, which is so thick with absurd adspeak, you'd think it was written by the crew at The Onion or The Simpsons – especially that episode where Krusty starts shilling for the Canyonero."

In a 2004 article in the Chicago Tribune, Jim Mateja noted that people have pointed out a similarity between the GMC Canyon and the Canyonero. When contacted, GMC responded that the GMC is a pickup truck, while the Canyonero is a parody of an SUV.

Joshua Dowling of The Sun-Herald described the philosophy of the Ford F-250 as "The Canyonero comes to life".

== Reception ==
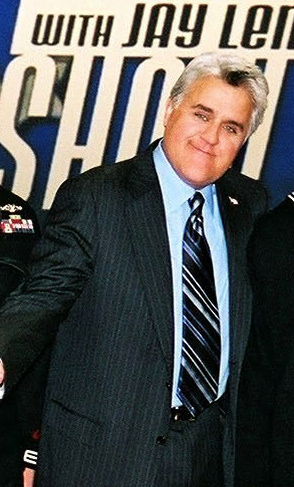
Jay Leno said in the DVD commentary for "The Last Temptation of Krust" that he could not tell whether the writers were poking fun at him or complimenting him.

In its original broadcast, "The Last Temptation of Krust" finished 21st in ratings for the week of February 16–23, 1998, with a Nielsen rating of 9.7, equivalent to approximately 9.5 million viewing households. It was the fourth highest-rated show on the Fox network that week, following The X-Files, The World's Scariest Police Chases, and King of the Hill.

In 2006, USA Today highlighted the episode in a review of The Simpsons ninth season.

In his review of the season nine DVD, Joseph Szadkowski of The Washington Times noted: "Among the 22-minute gems found in the set, I most enjoyed ... [Krusty's] work with Jay Leno."

Mark Evans of the Evening Herald wrote: "'The Last Temptation of Krust' is a winner for its title alone as Krusty the clown becomes a satiric 'alternative' comedian but then sells out by advertising the Canyonero SUV road hazard."

Alan Sepinwall wrote positively of the episode in The Star-Ledger, citing the Canyonero sequence as "the real reason to watch" the episode and that "It's an oversize vehicle that will create oversized laughs."

Some sources mistakenly refer to this episode as "The Last Temptation of Krusty".

In the book I Can't Believe It's a Bigger and Better Updated Unofficial Simpsons Guide, Warren Martyn and Adrian Wood characterized the episode as "a good twist on the never-ending Krusty story" and suggested that while "Jay Leno turns in a nice cameo [...] the show is stolen by the advert for the Canyonero". The authors also praised Krusty's "ponytail and black sweater" look.

In the DVD audio commentary for "The Last Temptation of Krust", Leno said that he believed the essence of comedy clubs was depicted very well in the episode and referred to Krusty's remodeled appearance as "[George] Carlin post-Vegas act". He also appreciated Krusty's poke at Leno's use of news headlines on The Tonight Show with Jay Leno and said that he could not figure out whether parts of the episode were making fun of him or complimenting him.

William Irwin's The Simpsons and Philosophy: The D'oh! of Homer references a scene from the episode as an example of Marge's passive resistance, her moral influence on Lisa, and her value as a role model for her children.

== See also ==
- List of products in The Simpsons
