= Paul Benedict =

American actor (1938–2008)

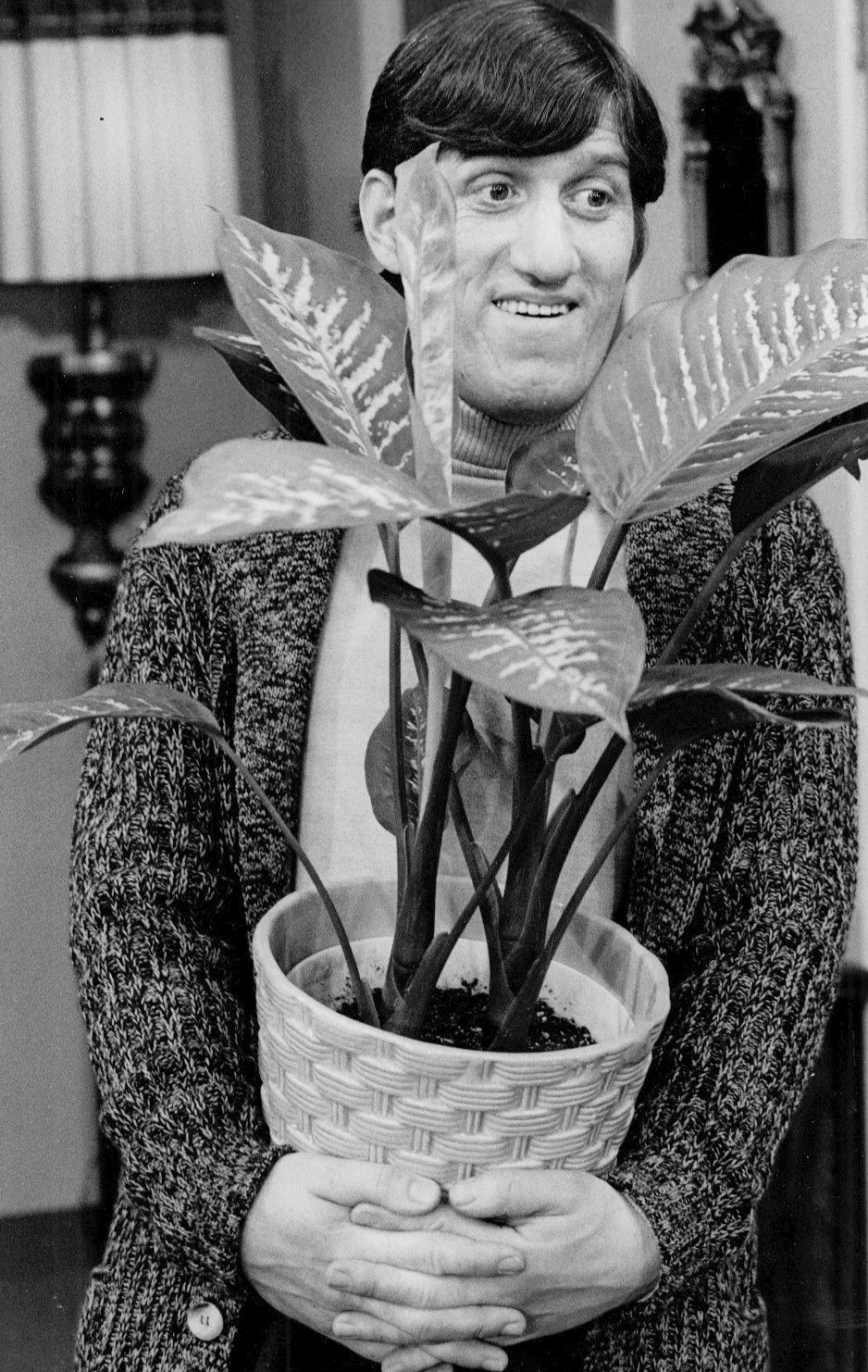
- Paul Benedict as Harry Bentley, 1975
- Born: Paul Bernard Benedict; September 17, 1938; Silver City, New Mexico, U.S.
- Died: December 1, 2008 (aged 70); Martha's Vineyard, Massachusetts, U.S.
- Education: Suffolk University
- Occupation: Actor
- Years active: 1965–2008
- Known for: The Jeffersons; Sesame Street

Paul Bernard Benedict (September 17, 1938 – December 1, 2008) was an American actor who made numerous appearances in television and films, beginning in 1965. He was known for his roles as The Number Painter on the PBS children's show Sesame Street and as the English neighbor Harry Bentley on the CBS sitcom The Jeffersons.

== Early life ==
Benedict was born in Silver City, New Mexico, the son of Alma Marie (née Loring), a journalist, and Mitchell M. Benedict, a doctor, and grew up in Massachusetts, where he graduated from Boston College High School and Suffolk University. Benedict served a tour of duty in the U.S. Marine Corps. His oversized jaw and large nose were partially attributed to acromegaly; he was first diagnosed with it by an endocrinologist who saw Benedict in a theatrical production.

== Film and TV work ==
Norman Lear cast Benedict as a Zen Buddhist in Cold Turkey, which was completed in late fall 1969 but not released until February 1971. Benedict would go on to work with Lear in the coming years on various television projects.

Benedict was best known for his role as Harry Bentley on the television series The Jeffersons. He played this role from the series' inception in 1975. He was credited only in season 7 in some episodes, only appeared in 4 episodes in season 8, and remained until the end of the series in 1985. His character was a well-mannered English bachelor who lived in the apartment next door to George and Louise Jefferson. He worked at the United Nations as a translator. Bentley was liked by all of the characters on the show except George Jefferson, who found him annoying, but they gradually became friends as the show progressed. A recurring gag had Bentley telling boring, pointless stories about his past, particularly about his childhood and relatives in England.

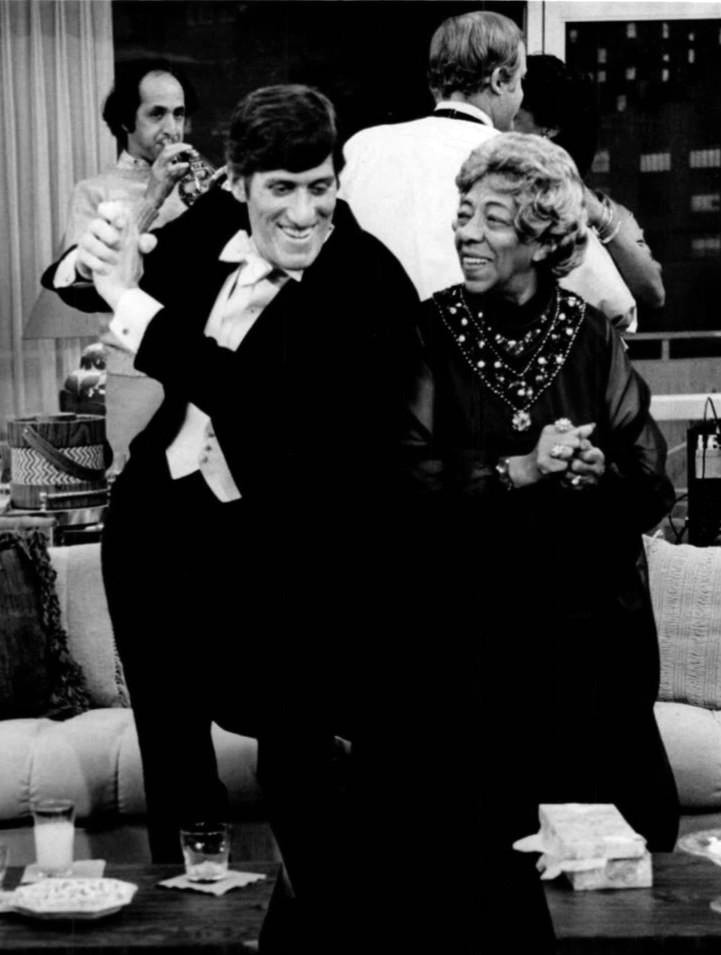
Paul Benedict and Zara Cully in The Jeffersons (1975)

Benedict played the recurring character The Number Painter on the children's PBS show Sesame Street.

Benedict played the father of a fugitive teen runaway in the 1971 film Taking Off, which was Miloš Forman's first American film. In the same year he had a small role as a food vendor in They Might Be Giants, starring George C. Scott. Perhaps his best-known movie role from that period was that of Reverend Lindquist in Sydney Pollack's 1972 film Jeremiah Johnson, starring Robert Redford.

In the 1974 film The Front Page, Benedict appeared as Plunkett, the emissary of the governor. In Dino De Laurentiis's Mandingo (1975), he played a slave trader opposite James Mason and Perry King. In the movie The Goodbye Girl (1977) starring Richard Dreyfuss and Marsha Mason, Benedict played the stage director of a production of Richard III in which Richard III was to be portrayed as a stereotypical gay man. He was the patiently eccentric butler in Dr. Necessiter's Gothic-castle apartment in The Man With Two Brains (1983), and had a short scene in the mockumentary This Is Spinal Tap (1984), playing Tucker Smitty Brown, the awkward hotel desk clerk who checks in the band. Called a "twisted old fruit" by the band's manager Ian, he replies, "I'm just as God made me, sir."

In 1988, Benedict played Fairchild, Dudley Moore's butler in the movie Arthur 2: On the Rocks, the sequel to the hit 1981 film Arthur. That same year, in the film Cocktail, he portrayed a condescending business college professor. In the 1990 film The Freshman, he played a similar role, this time an NYU film school professor. In 1991, he starred in The Addams Family as the grouchy judge George Womack. He also made an appearance as the incorrectly assumed title character in the 1996 film Waiting for Guffman, another mockumentary involving many of the same writers and actors as This Is Spinal Tap. He played Fay's father in the story of Rumpelstiltskin in the Between the Lions episode "Hay Day" and appeared on the TV show A Different World, season 4 episode 8 as Mr. Ludlow.

Benedict appeared in a 1998 Seinfeld episode as a magazine editor with The New Yorker who was questioned by Elaine about a cartoon in the magazine. His final television appearance was a guest spot on The Drew Carey Show in 2002.

== Theater ==
Following his graduation from Suffolk University in his hometown of Boston, Benedict began acting at the Theatre Company of Boston and performed with Robert De Niro, Dustin Hoffman and Al Pacino.

In addition to his varied film and television roles, Benedict was an accomplished theater actor, having appeared on Broadway multiple times, notably in Eugene O'Neill's two-character play Hughie in 1996 (performing with Al Pacino) at the Circle in the Square Theater, and more recently in The Music Man in 2000–2001. He appeared Off-Broadway in 1986 in Terrence McNally's It's Only a Play. He had directed a production of the work Off-off-Broadway several years before.

In 2007, Benedict performed as "Hirst" in Harold Pinter's No Man's Land at the American Repertory Theater in Cambridge, Massachusetts.

Benedict directed Frank D. Gilroy's Any Given Day on Broadway. Off-Broadway, he directed the original production of Terrence McNally's Frankie and Johnny in the Claire de Lune, and Kathy Najimy's and Mo Gaffney's The Kathy and Mo Show, which won an Obie Award.

== Death ==
On December 1, 2008, Benedict was found dead of a brain hemorrhage at his home in Aquinnah, Martha's Vineyard, Massachusetts. He was 70 years old.

Benedict was awarded a posthumous Elliot Norton Award by the Boston Theater Critics Association in 2009.

== Filmography ==
Year	Title	Role	Notes
1965	The Double-Barrelled Detective Story	Wells Fargo Ferguson	
1969	The Virgin President	Rutherford Melon	
1971	Cold Turkey	Zen Buddhist	
1971	Taking Off	Ben Lockston	
1971	They Might Be Giants	Chestnut Man	
1971	The Gang That Couldn't Shoot Straight	Shots O'Toole	
1972	Deadhead Miles	Hitchhiker	
1972	Jeremiah Johnson	Reverend Lindquist	
1972	Up the Sandbox	Dr. Beineke	
1974	The Front Page	Plunkett	
1975	Mandingo	Brownlee	
1975	Smile	Orren Brooks	
1977	The Goodbye Girl	Mark	
1977	Billy in the Lowlands	Billy's Father	
1981	Steigler and Steigler	Cosmo	
1982	The Electric Grandmother	Guido Fantoccini	
1983	The Man with Two Brains	Butler	
1984	The Lonely Guy	Dr. Zook	Voice, Uncredited
1984	This Is Spinal Tap	Tucker 'Smitty' Brown	
1988	Arthur 2: On the Rocks	Fairchild	
1988	Cocktail	Finance Teacher	
1988	The Chair	Warden Edward Dwyer	
1990	The Freshman	Arthur Fleeber	
1990	Sibling Rivalry	Dr. Plotner	
1991	The Addams Family	Judge Womack	
1993	Attack of the 50 Ft. Woman	Dr. Victor Loeb	
1995	Guns and Lipstick	Mickey	
1996	Waiting for Guffman	Roy Loomis	
1997	The Devil's Advocate	Walter Krasna	Uncredited
1998	A Fish in the Bathtub	Milo	
2000	Isn't She Great	Prof. Brainiac	
2003	A Mighty Wind	Martin Berg	
2004	After the Sunset	Night Shift Guard	
2008	Side by Each	Chief Rodrocks	(final film role)
