= Bruce Baum =

American comedian (born 1952)

- Born: March 18, 1952 (age 74)
- Education: University of California, Davis; University of California, Los Angeles
- Occupation: Comedian

Bruce Baum (born March 18, 1952) is an American comedian. His live act consists of prop comedy as well as more traditional stand-up material. One of his best-known stand-up routines is his diaper-wearing Baby Man character. Baum is recognized for his large mustache, long hair, and remarkable resemblance to musician David Crosby.

== Biography ==
Baum was a football player at UCLA but transferred to the University of California, Davis to receive more playing time. At UC Davis, he earned a degree in political science while performing impromptu comedy routines in the school library and food commons. Bruce also performed as a singer/songwriter while at UC Davis, playing small clubs in and around the Sacramento area. He returned to UCLA to earn a master's degree in film and, while working on film school projects, became friends with comedians such as Garry Shandling, Robin Williams, and Bob Saget. He joined the stand-up circuit in 1977, performing at The Comedy Store. He also appeared frequently on the 1979-80 revival of the TV game show Make Me Laugh.

In 1981, Baum, billed as Bruce "Baby Man" Baum, recorded the comedy song "Marty Feldman Eyes", a parody of the Kim Carnes hit "Bette Davis Eyes". He also starred as "Baby Man" in the movie The Adventures of Babyman: Born To Be Raised. Other song parodies include "Don’t Cha Wish Your Boyfriend Was Bald Like Me?" and "Cowifornication", a parody of "Californication". Baum has a band called NogginBlast.

From 1983 to 1984, Baum appeared several times as a panelist on Match Game-Hollywood Squares Hour. In 1986, he appeared with Dallas stars Jenilee Harrison and Audrey Landers on Super Password with Bert Convy.

Baum has appeared in several television programs since the early 1980s, including The Stockard Channing Show, Growing Pains, Full House, and Northern Exposure. He also appeared as an animated version of himself on The Simpsons, guest-starring with Jay Leno, Janeane Garofalo, Steven Wright, and Bobcat Goldthwait in the season 9 episode "The Last Temptation of Krust".

Baum performed in short films and sketches on Comic Strip Live and The Sunday Comics for FOX in the late 1980s and early 1990s, then appeared on America's Funniest People on ABC. He also served as a creative consultant for three seasons of Whose Line Is It Anyway?.

== Bibliography ==
Baum and comedian Barry Marder co-authored the first three Letters From a Nut books, written under the pseudonym Ted L. Nancy. Baums fourth book is titles ON HOLD.

- Letters From A Nut (with Barry Marder)
- More Letters From A Nut (with Barry Marder)
- Extra Nutty: Even More Letters From A Nut (with Barry Marder)
- On Hold
- The Adventures of Babyman - Comic & Coloring Book

== Discography ==
- "Don’t Drive" (with NogginBlast)
- "Marty Feldman Eyes"
- "Born To Be Raised" (album)
- "Don’t Cha Wish Your Boyfriend Was Bald Like Me?" (with The Pudgy Bald Guys)
- "Cowifornication" (with The Red Hot Chili Heifers)
- Bruce Baum's Greatest Hits Vol. 7
