= Portnoy's Complaint (film) =

1972 film by Ernest Lehman

- Theatrical release poster
- Directed by: Ernest Lehman
- Screenplay by: Ernest Lehman
- Based on: Portnoy's Complaint by Philip Roth
- Produced by: Ernest Lehman; Sidney Beckerman
- Starring: Richard Benjamin; Karen Black; Lee Grant; Jack Somack; Jeannie Berlin; Jill Clayburgh; Francesca De Sapio; Kevin Conway; Lewis J. Stadlen; Renée Lippin
- Cinematography: Philip Lathrop
- Edited by: Sam O'Steen; Gordon Scott
- Music by: Michel Legrand
- Production company: Chenault Productions
- Distributed by: Warner Bros.
- Release date: June 19, 1972
- Running time: 101 minutes
- Country: United States
- Language: English

Portnoy's Complaint is a 1972 American comedy film written and directed by Ernest Lehman. His screenplay is based on the bestselling 1969 novel of the same name by Philip Roth. It was Lehman's first and only directorial effort. The film starred Richard Benjamin, Karen Black and Lee Grant, with Jack Somack, Jeannie Berlin and Jill Clayburgh in supporting roles.

== Plot ==
The film focuses on the trials and tribulations of Alexander Portnoy, a Jewish man employed as the assistant commissioner of human opportunity for New York City.

During a session with his psychoanalyst (who never speaks during the film), he explores his childhood, his relationship with his overbearing mother, his sexual fantasies and desires, his problems with women, and his obsession with his own religion. Via flashbacks, we learn about his affairs with Bubbles Girardi, the daughter of a local hoodlum; leftist Israeli Naomi, whom he attempts to rape; and gentile Mary Jane Reid, whose nickname "Monkey" reflects her remarkable agility at achieving a variety of sexual positions.

Mary Jane seemingly is the girl of Portnoy's dreams, but as their relationship deepens and she begins to pressure him into giving her a ring, he shrinks from making a permanent commitment to her. He repeatedly seems to recall, traumatically, her suicide by jumping off a building after a fight with him; but the end of the film shows him walking away from his therapist's office, and just missing, in the New York street crowd, Mary Jane, who is walking in the other direction and still alive, putting into question the entire narrative Portnoy gave his therapist.

== Cast ==
- Richard Benjamin as Alexander Portnoy
- Karen Black as Mary Jane Reid / "The Monkey"
- Lee Grant as Sophie Portnoy
- Jack Somack as Jack Portnoy
- Jeannie Berlin as "Bubbles" Girardi
- Jill Clayburgh as Naomi
- D. P. Barnes as Dr. Otto Spielvogel
- Francesca De Sapio as Lina
- Kevin Conway as Smolka
- Lewis J. Stadlen as Mandel
- Renée Lippin as Hannah Portnoy
- Minta Durfee as Elevator Lady

== Critical reception ==
In contrast to Goodbye, Columbus, which did well at the box office and was liked by critics, this second attempt at Roth bombed miserably. Roger Ebert of the Chicago Sun-Times called the film "a true fiasco" and added,

The movie has no heart and little apparent sympathy with its Jewish characters; it replaces Roth's cynical and carefully aimed satire with a bunch of offensive one-liners, and it uses the cover of a best seller to get away with ethnic libels that entirely lose their point out of Roth's specific context. And what's maybe even worse, it takes the most cherished of all Jewish stereotypes—the Jewish mother—and gets it wrong. The Sophie Portnoy of Roth's novel was at least a recognizable caricature. But the Mrs. Portnoy of the movie is simply a morass of frantic dialog, clumsily photographed. There's no person there at all.

Vincent Canby of The New York Times called it "an unqualified disaster as a film, a ponderous, off-center comedy that...is almost as tasteless as many idiots—people who don't know the difference between good tastelessness and bad tastelessness—thought the novel was, wrongly." Gene Siskel of the Chicago Tribune gave the film one star out of four and wrote "Ernest Lehman, who served as script writer and director, has replaced Alex's energy with surprisingly tame and traditional Hollywood melodrama visuals, and when these visuals are matched with a soundtrack full of dirty language, the effect is depressing." Variety was positive and called it "a most effective, honest in context, necessarily strong and appropriately bawdy study in ruinous self-indulgence. Besides adapting the Philip Roth novel into a lucid, balanced and moral screenplay, and producing handsomely on various locations, Ernest Lehman makes an excellent directorial debut. Richard Benjamin heads an outstanding cast." Charles Champlin of the Los Angeles Times described the film as an "honorable failure" in part because "Lehman does not have, or couldn't devise, a cinematic style equivalent to Roth's literary style." He also thought the film failed to capture Portnoy's complex feelings about being Jewish-American, which "are central to the book." Gary Arnold of The Washington Post found the film "entertaining at some level. Even when the filmmakers are messing up—missing the point of the Philip Roth novel or simply exploiting its sexual candor and comedy in an arbitrary, piecemeal fashion—they manage to be reasonably diverting."

TV Guide rated the film one out of a possible four stars and wrote "Roth's novel was very funny and often shocking for its own sake, but the film, an embarrassment for everyone involved, fails miserably in adapting the book to the big screen...the production, done so slickly, does veil, to some degree, the horrible script and bad performances."
