= Paul Schmidt (translator) =

American translator, playwright (1934–1999)

- Born: January 29, 1934; Brooklyn, New York, U.S.
- Died: February 19, 1999 (aged 65); New York City, New York, U.S.
- Education: Colgate University
- Occupations: Professor, translator
- Spouse: Stockard Channing (m. 1970; div. 1976)
- Writing career
- Language: English
- Genres: poetry, plays
- Notable awards: Helen Hayes Award, Joseph Kesselring Prize

Paul Francis Schmidt (January 29, 1934 – February 19, 1999) was an American translator, poet, playwright, and essayist.

== Biography ==
He graduated from Nashua High School in 1951, Colgate University in 1955, and studied at Harvard University.

He studied mime with Marcel Marceau and acting with Jacques Charon.

He served in the U.S. Army Intelligence, from 1958 to 1960.

Schmidt was professor at the University of Texas at Austin, from 1967 to 1976. He also taught at the Yale School of Drama.

He translated Euripides, Chekhov, Velimir Khlebnikov, Brecht, Genet, Gogol, Marivaux, Mayakovsky, and Rimbaud.

He wrote three plays, one of which, Black Sea Follies won the Helen Hayes Award, and the Joseph Kesselring Prize for best play. Schmidt was a frequently-commissioned theater collaborator. He translated plays by Chekhov and Racine for productions developed by the Wooster Group in NYC, and Genet’s “The Screens” for JoAnne Akalaitis at the Guthrie Theatre. He also wrote an original libretto for the Robert Wilson - Tom Waits opera “Alice" (developed and premiered in Hamburg, later seen at BAM).

Schmidt's work was profiled in The New York Review of Books.

He was married to Stockard Channing.

He is buried at Green-Wood Cemetery, Brooklyn, New York.

== Bibliography ==
- Night Life, Painted Leaf Press, 1996, ISBN 978-0-9651558-0-9
- Winter Solstice, Painted Leaf Press, 1996, ISBN 978-0-9651558-2-3

=== Translations ===
- Arthur Rimbaud: Complete Works, 1975; HarperPerennial, 2000, ISBN 978-0-06-095550-2
- Meyerhold at work, University of Texas Press, 1980, ISBN 978-0-292-75058-6
- Velimir Khlebnikov (1985). Charlotte Douglas (ed.). The king of time: selected writings of the Russian futurian. Translated by Paul Schmidt. Harvard University Press.
- Chekhov, Anton (1997). The plays of Anton Chekhov. Translated by Paul Schmidt. New York: HarperCollins.
- Anton Pavlovich Chekhov (1999). Ivanov. Translated by Paul Schmidt. Dramatists Play Service. ISBN 978-0-8222-1646-9.
- Anton Pavlovich Chekhov (1999). Seven short farces. Translated by Paul Schmidt. Dramatists Play Service. ISBN 978-0-8222-1645-2.
- Catherine Ciepiela; Honor Moore, eds. (2007). The Stray Dog cabaret: a book of Russian poems. Translator Paul Schmidt. New York Review of Books. ISBN 978-1-59017-191-2.

=== Critical studies and reviews of Schmidt's work ===
- John Beaufort (December 31, 1986). "Foote's 'The Widow Claire' and Schmidt's 'Black Sea Follies'". The Christian Science Monitor.
- John Simon (January 12, 1987). "Dmitri and the Wolf". New York Magazine.

The Plays of Anton Chekhov

- Kirsch, Adam (July 1997). "Chekhov in American". Books. The Atlantic Monthly. 280 (1): 110–112.
