= Goldie and the Boxer =

- Genre: Drama
- Written by: Ethel Brez; Mel Brez; David Debin; Douglas Schwartz
- Directed by: David Miller
- Starring: O.J. Simpson; Melissa Michaelsen
- Music by: Jimmie Haskell
- Country of origin: United States
- Original language: English

Production
- Executive producer: O. J. Simpson
- Producers: Dan Mark; Audrey A. Blasdel; Hugh Benson
- Cinematography: Isidore Mankofsky
- Editor: J. Terry Williams
- Running time: 120 minutes
- Production companies: Orenthal Productions; Columbia Pictures Television

Original release
- Network: NBC
- Release: December 30, 1979

Goldie and the Boxer is a made-for-television film starring O. J. Simpson. The production was broadcast on the NBC television network on December 30, 1979.

While being panned by critics, it was a solid ratings hit and led to a sequel, Goldie and the Boxer Go to Hollywood (1981).

== Plot ==
In 1946, Joe Gallagher, WWII veteran, is a down-on-his luck boxer whose life and career undergo a change when an orphaned, little girl named Goldie is left in his care.

== Cast ==
- O. J. Simpson - Joe Gallagher
- Melissa Michaelsen - Goldie Kellog
- John Roselius - Paul Kellog
- Vincent Gardenia - Diamond
- Phil Silvers - Wally
- Ned Glass - Al Levinsky
- Gordon Jump - Alex
- Judyann Elder - Bernette Wilson
- Judy Landers - Bonnie Dare
- Madlyn Rhue - Marsha
- Annazette Chase - Anne Bennington
- Claude Earl Jones - Willie
- Fran Ryan - Cook
