= Stockard Channing =

American actress (born 1944)

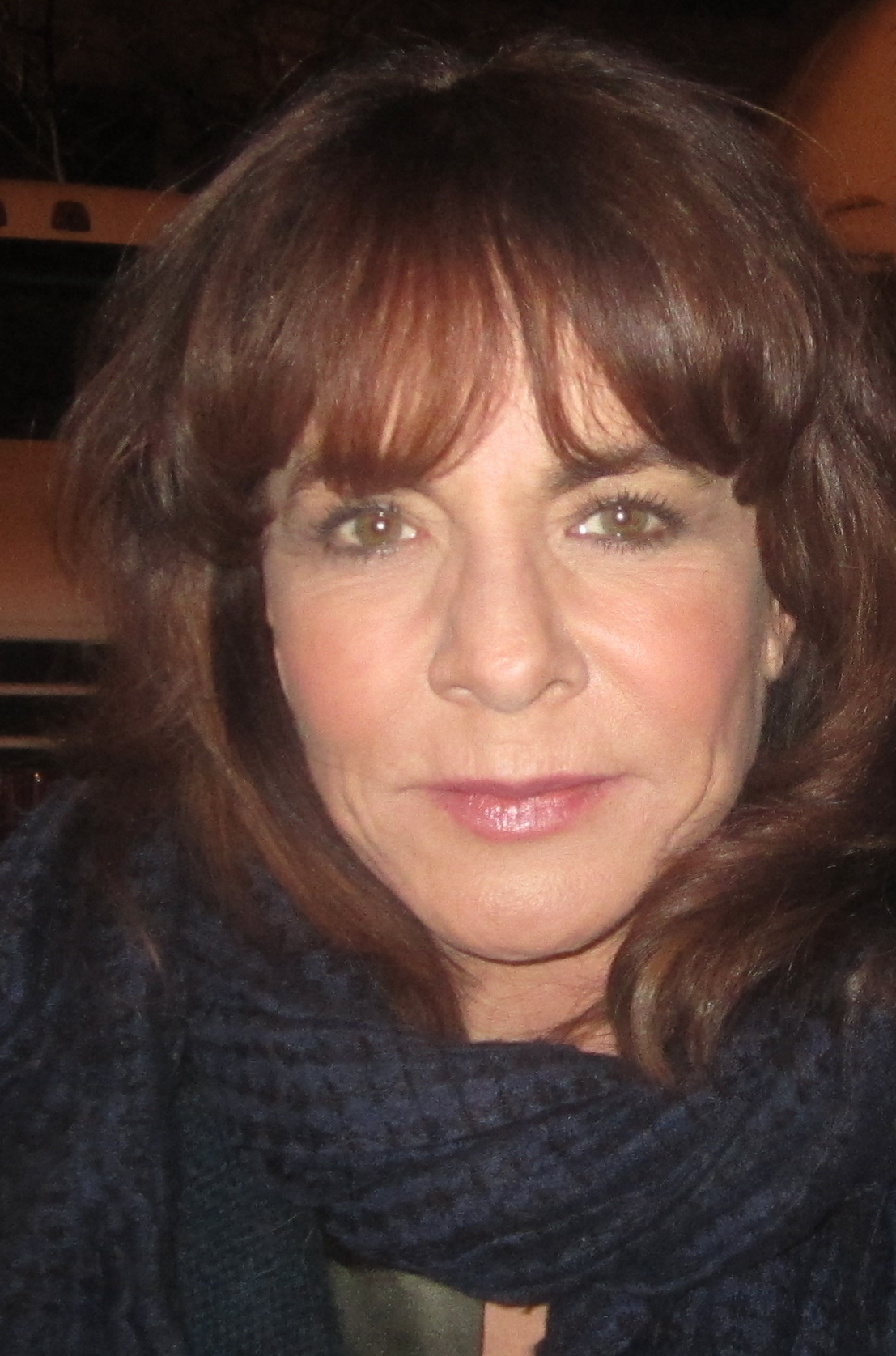
- Channing in 2011
- Born: Susan Antonia Williams Stockard; February 13, 1944 (age 82); New York City, U.S.
- Education: Radcliffe College of Harvard University (BA)
- Occupation: Actress
- Years active: 1969–present
- Notable work: Full list
- Spouses: Walter Channing Jr. (m. 1963; div. 1967) Paul Schmidt (m. 1970; div. 1976) David Debin (m. 1976; div. 1980) David Rawle (m. 1980; div. 1988)
- Partner: Daniel Gillham (1990–2014)
- Awards: Full list

Stockard Channing (born Susan Antonia Williams Stockard; February 13, 1944) is an American actress. Known for her performances on stage and screen, she has received numerous accolades, including a Tony Award, three Emmy Awards, and an Actor Award, in addition to nominations for an Academy Award, a Grammy Award, and three Golden Globe Awards.

Channing played Betty Rizzo in the film Grease (1978) and First Lady Abbey Bartlet in the NBC television series The West Wing (1999–2006). She also originated the role of Ouisa Kittredge in the stage and film versions of Six Degrees of Separation; the 1993 film version earned her an Academy Award nomination for Best Actress.

Channing won the 1985 Tony Award for Best Actress in a Play for the Broadway revival of A Day in the Death of Joe Egg, and won Emmy Awards for The West Wing and The Matthew Shepard Story, both in 2002. She won a Daytime Emmy Award in 2005 for her role in Jack. Her film appearances include The Fortune (1975), The Big Bus (1976), The Cheap Detective (1978), Heartburn (1986), To Wong Foo, Thanks for Everything! Julie Newmar (1995), Up Close & Personal (1996), Practical Magic (1998), and Woody Allen's Anything Else (2003). She also played the recurring role of Veronica Loy on the CBS drama The Good Wife (2012–16).

== Early life and education ==
Channing was born in Manhattan, and she grew up on the affluent Upper East Side. She is the daughter of Mary Alice English, who came from a large Brooklyn Irish American Roman Catholic family, and Lester Napier Stockard (died 1960), who was in the shipping business. Her elder sister is Lesly Stockard Smith, former mayor of Palm Beach, Florida.

Channing is an alumna of the Madeira School in McLean, Virginia, a boarding school for girls, which she attended after starting at the Chapin School in New York City. She studied history and literature at Radcliffe College of Harvard University in Massachusetts and graduated summa cum laude in 1965. She received her acting training at HB Studio in New York City.

== Career ==
=== 1960s and 1970s ===
Channing started her acting career with the experimental Theatre Company of Boston; she performed in the group's Off-Broadway 1969 production of the Elaine May play Adaptation/Next. She performed in a revival of Arsenic and Old Lace directed by Theodore Mann as part of the Circle in the Square at Ford's Theatre program in 1970. In 1971, she made her Broadway debut in Two Gentlemen of Verona — The Musical, working with playwright John Guare. She also appeared on Broadway in 1973 in a supporting role in No Hard Feelings at the Martin Beck Theatre.

Channing made her television debut on Sesame Street in the role of The Number Painter's female victim. She landed her first leading role in the 1973 television movie The Girl Most Likely To..., a black comedy written by Joan Rivers about an ugly duckling woman, made newly beautiful by plastic surgery after an auto accident, who vows murderous revenge on all who had scorned her. For the role, Channing went through a considerable transformation, with the syndicated column "TV Scout" reporting months later, "It was a great make-up job — at least the part that made very pretty Stockard look so ugly. She had her cheeks puffed out with cotton and her nose was wadded, too, to make it thick and off-center. Very thick eyebrows were drawn on her face, and she wore padded clothes to make her look fat. Making her look beautiful was easy."

After some small parts in feature films, Channing co-starred with Warren Beatty and Jack Nicholson in Mike Nichols' The Fortune (1975). Despite Channing being tagged "the next big thing" in cinema, and the actress herself considering this some of the best work of her career, the movie did poorly at the box office and did not prove to be the breakthrough role Channing hoped it would be. On May 22, 1977, she, along with Ned Beatty, starred in the pilot for the short-lived TV series Lucan. Lucan, played by Kevin Brophy, is a 20-year-old who has spent the first 10 years of his life running wild in the forest. After being raised by wolves, Lucan strikes out on his own in search of his identity.

In 1977, at the age of 33, Channing was cast for the role of high school teenager Betty Rizzo in the hit musical Grease. The film was released in 1978 and her performance earned her the People's Choice Award for Favorite Motion Picture Supporting Actress.

In addition, during the second half of the 1970s, Channing played a mischievous car thief in Jerry Schatzberg's 1976 dramedy Sweet Revenge (which competed at the Cannes Film Festival), Joseph Bologna's love interest in the disaster film spoof The Big Bus (also 1976), Peter Falk's secretary in the 1978 Neil Simon film The Cheap Detective, and real-life deaf stuntwoman and former female land speed record holder Kitty O'Neil in the TV movie Silent Victory: The Kitty O'Neil Story (1979).

=== 1980s ===
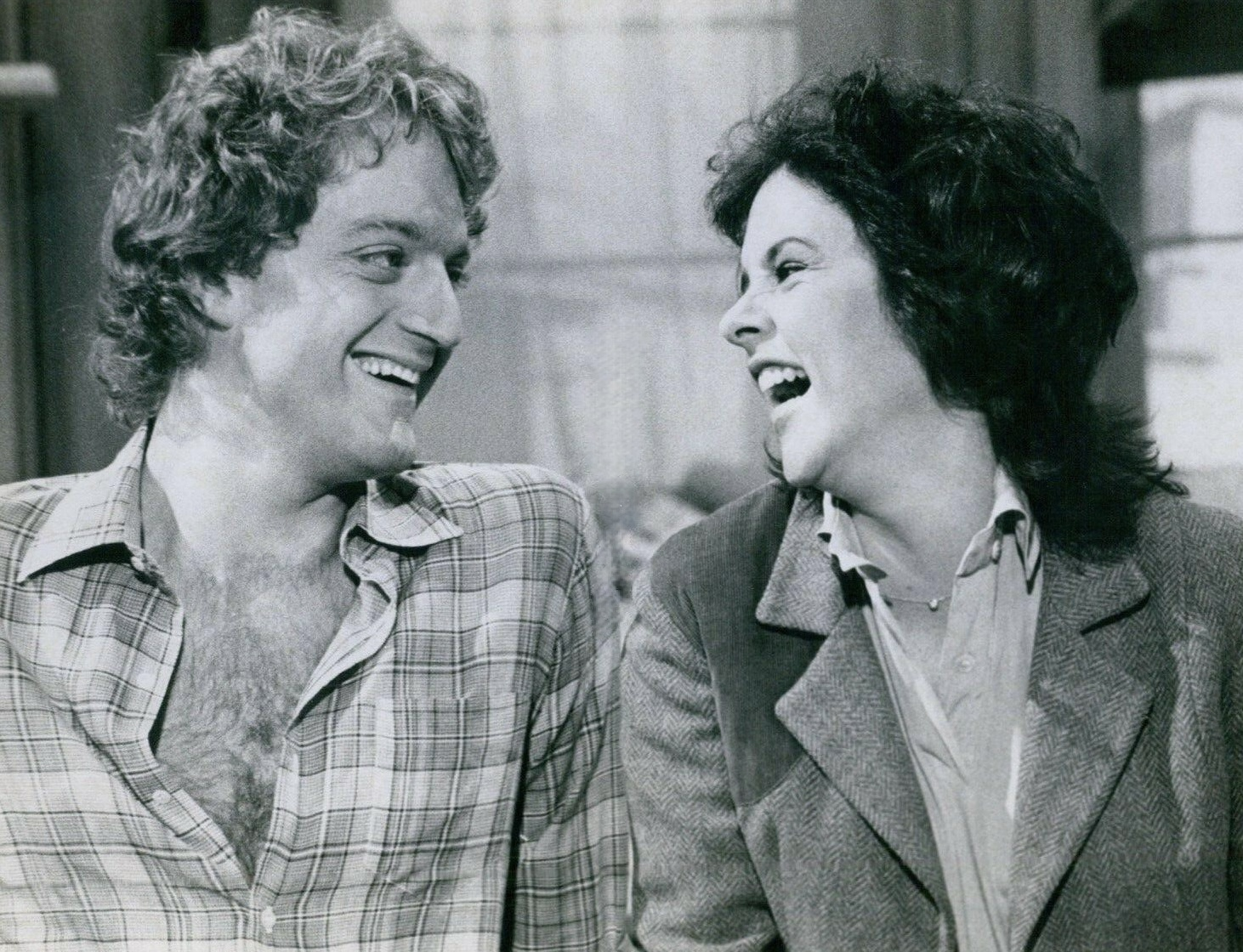
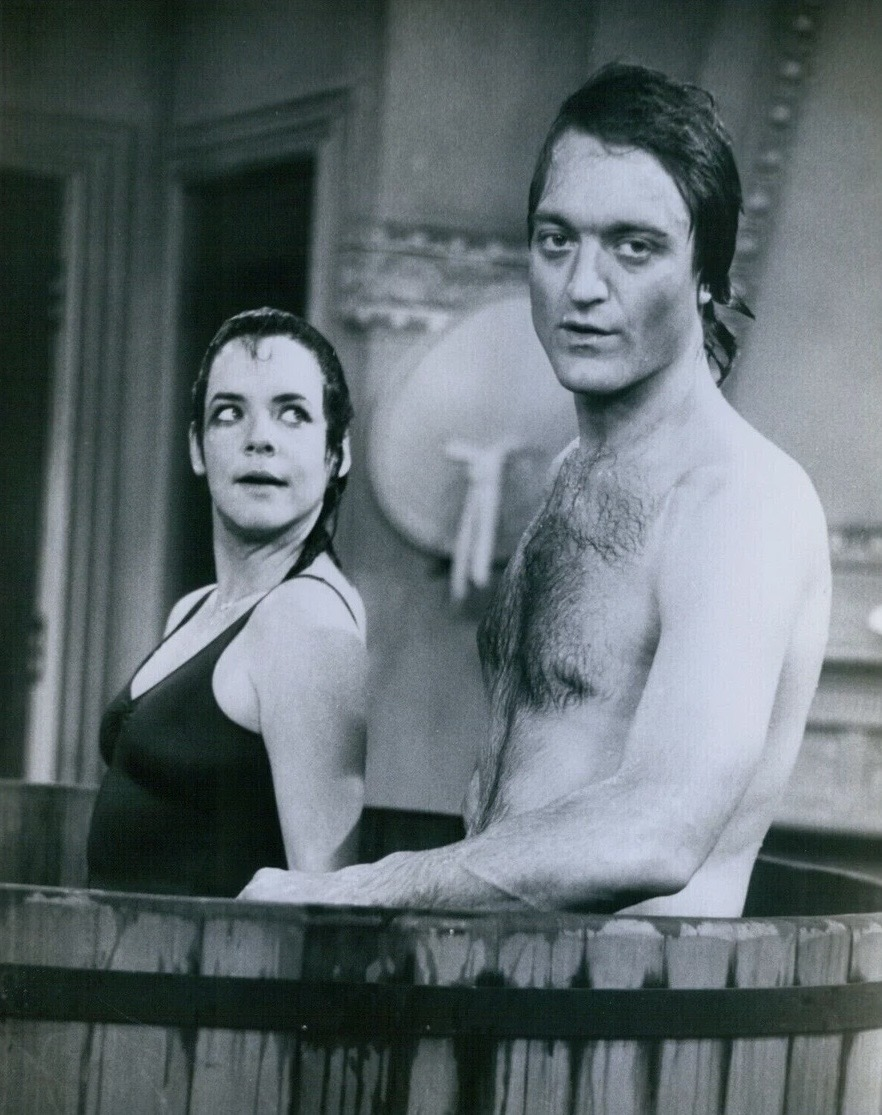
Channing in Just Friends (1979) with Gerrit Graham

Channing starred in two short-lived sitcoms on CBS in 1979 and 1980: Just Friends and The Stockard Channing Show. In both shows, she co-starred with actress Sydney Goldsmith, who played her best friend in both. When her Hollywood career faltered after these failures, Channing returned to her theatre roots. Nevertheless, she continued to appear in movies, often in supporting roles, including 1983's Without a Trace (alongside Kate Nelligan and Judd Hirsch), Mike Nichols' 1986 Heartburn (re-teaming with Nichols and Jack Nicholson, and co-starring Meryl Streep), The Men's Club (also 1986; featuring Roy Scheider, Harvey Keitel, and Jennifer Jason Leigh), A Time of Destiny (1988; with William Hurt, Timothy Hutton, and Melissa Leo), and Staying Together (1989; directed by Lee Grant, and co-starring Melinda Dillon and Levon Helm.)

Channing played the female lead in the Broadway show, They're Playing Our Song (1980–81). Channing then took the part of the mother (Sheila) in the 1981 Long Wharf Theater (New Haven) production of Peter Nichols' A Day in the Death of Joe Egg. She reprised the role in the Roundabout Theater Company production, first Off-Broadway in January 1985 and then on Broadway in March 1985, and won the 1985 Tony Award for Best Actress in a Play.

Channing continued her return to the stage by teaming up again with playwright John Guare. She received Tony Award nominations for her performances in his plays, The House of Blue Leaves (1986) and Six Degrees of Separation (1990), for which she also won an Obie Award. The Alan Ayckbourn play Woman in Mind received its American premiere Off-Broadway in February 1988 at the Manhattan Theatre Club. The production was directed by Lynne Meadow and the cast included Channing in the role of Susan, for which she won a Drama Desk Award for Best Actress. When once asked if Susan was Channing's most fully realized character, the actress replied:

Well, you like to think that they're all fully realized because what you're doing is different from what anyone else is seeing. You do a character but how much of it is on film, or how much of it is seen by an audience, is really up to the director, the piece, or the audience. And so, I just do these people. And flesh them out. I think anything else is not my job.

Channing made her London theatre debut in 1992 at the Royal Court Theatre in John Guare's Six Degrees of Separation, which then transferred for a season at the Comedy Theatre in the West End. In 2017, she returned to London to appear in Apologia at the Trafalgar Studios and again in 2021 in Night Mother at the Hampstead Theatre.

She also garnered recognition for her work in television during this time. She was nominated for an Emmy Award for the CBS miniseries Echoes in the Darkness (1987) and won a CableACE Award for the Harvey Fierstein-scripted Tidy Endings (HBO, 1988). Other TV movie credits during the latter half of the 1980s include the CBS teenage drug abuse-themed Not My Kid (1985; co-starring George Segal), Hallmark's domestic drama The Room Upstairs (1987; with Sam Waterston, Joan Allen, and Sarah Jessica Parker), and the HBO thriller Perfect Witness (1989; alongside Brian Dennehy and Aidan Quinn.)

=== 1990s ===
Channing reprised her lead role as an Upper East Side matron in the film version of Six Degrees of Separation. She was nominated for an Academy Award and a Golden Globe Award for her performance. She then made several films in quick succession: To Wong Foo, Thanks for Everything! Julie Newmar as Carol Ann and Smoke (both 1995); a cameo appearance in The First Wives Club; Up Close and Personal (as Marcia McGrath); and Moll Flanders (all 1996). For Smoke she was nominated for a Screen Actors Guild Award for Best Supporting Actress and for Moll Flanders she was nominated for the Satellite Award for Best Supporting Actress, Drama.

Channing kept busy with film, television, and stage roles throughout the late 1990s. She starred in the USA Network film An Unexpected Family in 1996 and its sequel, An Unexpected Life, in 1998. She was nominated for an Independent Spirit Award as Best Supporting Female for her performance as one-half of an infertile couple in The Baby Dance (also 1998). On stage, she performed at Lincoln Center in Tom Stoppard's Hapgood (1995) and the 1997 revival of Lillian Hellman's The Little Foxes. During this period, Channing voiced Barbara Gordon in the animated series, Batman Beyond. Channing also starred in Practical Magic released in 1998, which has gone on to become a cult classic.

Channing was nominated for the Tony Award for Best Actress three times in the 1990s: in 1991, for Six Degrees of Separation; in 1992, for Four Baboons Adoring the Sun; and in 1999, for The Lion in Winter.

=== The West Wing ===
In 1999, Channing took on the role of First Lady Abbey Bartlet in the NBC television series The West Wing. She was a recurring guest star for the show's first two seasons; she became a regular cast member in 2001. In the seventh and final season of The West Wing (2005–2006), Channing appeared in only four episodes (including the series finale) because she was co-starring (with Henry Winkler) in the CBS sitcom Out of Practice at the same time. Out of Practice was cancelled by CBS after one season.

=== Later work ===
Channing received several awards in 2002. She won the Emmy Award for Outstanding Supporting Actress in a Drama Series for her work on The West Wing. That same year, she also won the Emmy Award for Outstanding Supporting Actress in a Miniseries or a Movie and the Screen Actors Guild Award for Best Actress in a Television Movie or Miniseries for her portrayal of Judy Shepard in The Matthew Shepard Story, a docudrama about Matthew Shepard's life and murder. Channing received the 2002 London Film Critics Circle Award (ALFS) for Best Actress of the Year for her role in the film The Business of Strangers. For The Business of Strangers, she was also nominated for the American Film Institute Best Actress award. In 2003, she was awarded the Women in Film Lucy Award.

In 2005, Channing won a Daytime Emmy Award for Outstanding Performer in a Children/Youth/Family Special for Jack (2004), a Showtime TV movie about a young man struggling to understand why his father left the family for another man. Channing played Jack's mother. She was selected for the second narrator of the Animal Planet hit series Meerkat Manor in 2008, replacing Sean Astin, who did the first three seasons. In November 2008, she returned to Broadway as Vera Simpson in the musical Pal Joey and was nominated for the 2009 Tony Award for Best Leading Actress in a Musical.

In 2005, Channing starred in Out of Practice with Henry Winkler, receiving an Emmy nomination for her role. She played the role of Lydia Barnes, ex-wife of Stewart Barnes (Winkler), and had two sons and a lesbian daughter (Christopher Gorham, Paula Marshall, Ty Burrell). The show aired for one season (22 episodes). From 2012, Channing played a recurring role in The Good Wife. She played the role of the title character's mother Veronica Loy until the final season in 2016.

She returned to the stage in June 2010, to Dublin's Gaiety Theatre to play Lady Bracknell in Rough Magic's production of Oscar Wilde's The Importance of Being Earnest. Channing appeared in the play Other Desert Cities Off-Broadway at Lincoln Center and then on Broadway, as of October 2011. Channing was nominated for the Drama Desk Award, Outstanding Actress in a Play, and the Tony Award for Best Performance by a Leading Actress in a Play for Other Desert Cities. In 2018, she played the lead in Apologia, which had a limited run in London, and then moved to the Roundabout Theatre Co. in NYC.

Channing narrated the audiobook, "Frankie & Bug", written by Gayle Forman, released in 2021. In May 2023, Channing appeared in ITV's three-part series "MaryLand" alongside Suranne Jones and Eve Best, playing a character named Cathy. She played the character Wendy Whipple in Paramount's series Knuckles in 2024. In 2025, she played Clytemnestra in Sophocles' play Elektra, starring Brie Larson in the title role and directed by Daniel Fish. The play was performed in Brighton before moving to London in January. Channing reprised her role as Aunt Frances Owens in Practical Magic 2 in September 2026.

== Personal life ==
Channing has been married and divorced four times; she has no children. She married Walter Channing Jr. in 1963 and kept the amalgamated name "Stockard Channing" after they divorced in 1967. Her second husband was Paul Schmidt, a professor of Slavic languages (1970–1976), and her third was writer-producer David Debin (1976–1980). Her fourth husband was businessman David Rawle (1980–1988). Channing was in a relationship with cinematographer Daniel Gillham from 1990 until his death in 2014. They met on the set of A Time of Destiny.

In 2019, Channing resided in London.

== Discography ==
- Grease: The Original Soundtrack from the Motion Picture (RSO) (1978)

"Look at Me, I'm Sandra Dee" featuring Didi Conn, Dinah Manoff and Jamie Donnelly
"There Are Worse Things I Could Do"
