= Wiley Brown =

American football player, basketball player, and basketball coach

Wiley Brown, is the current Head Coach of the Indiana University Southeast Grenadiers Men's Basketball program. He is a retired NFL player, who lettered 2 years with the Philadelphia Eagles as a defensive end, before deciding to play professional basketball in the International Federation of Basketball where he traveled throughout the world. Brown spent one year with the CBA Louisville Catbirds and six years in Europe.

== Early years ==
Brown was born in Sylvester, Georgia. His grandmother Sarah Pope raised him and three other siblings along with his mother, who was also named Sarah.

Wiley Brown attended Worth County High School in Sylvester, Georgia where he played varsity basketball and led a prolific career with the Rams during his four years with the school. Wiley was regarded as one of the top recruits during his senior year and thus received numerous offers from Division I schools before deciding to enroll at the University of Louisville.

== Professional career ==
After finishing his successful collegiate basketball playing career, Brown joined the National Football League (NFL) where he played defensive end for two seasons with the Philadelphia Eagles. During his time with the Eagles' organization, Brown played under the direction of Dick Vermeil and Marion Campbell.

After his brief stint in the NFL, Brown returned to basketball. For seven years Brown played professional basketball in the International Federation of Basketball where he traveled throughout the world. Brown spent one year with the Continental Basketball Association's Louisville Catbirds and the remaining six years in Spain, France and Italy.
