= Low five =

Hand gesture

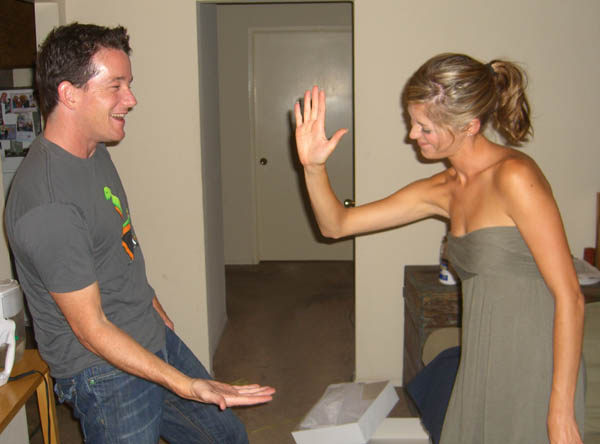
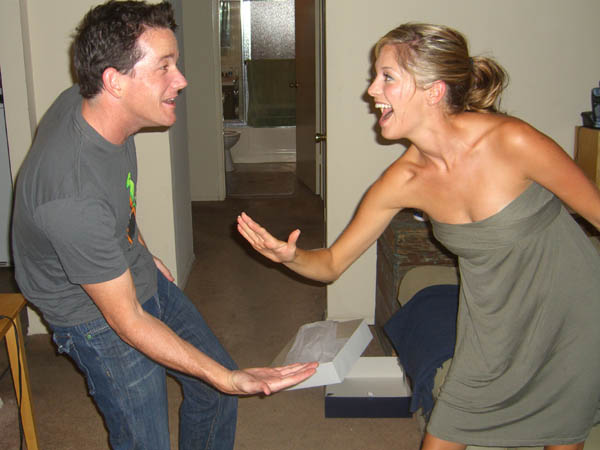
A low five palm slap gesture in motion

The low five is a hand gesture when two people slap palms together. One party extends an open palm, face upward at about waist level, the other party strikes the palm in a downward swing with their open palm. It is sometimes known as "slapping five", "give me five", or "giving/slapping skin". Archaic terms for it include "slip-slapping", "slapping the plank" and "soul shake".

The gesture is an antecedent of the high five which appeared in the 1970s.

== History ==
The low five had been known since at least the 1920s when it was used as a symbol of unity among African-Americans, and had more of a status as an underground symbol of solidarity than as a widespread gesture. In African-American English this was known as "giving skin" or "slapping skin".

In the 1927 film The Jazz Singer, actor Al Jolson performs the low five, in celebration of the news of a Broadway audition. Written evidence can be found in Cab Calloway's 1938 Hepster's Dictionary. "Gimme Some Skin" was a term current in 1940s Hipster subculture and had crossed over to mainstream culture, as seen in the 1941 Abbott and Costello film In the Navy where the Andrews Sisters perform "Gimme Some Skin, My Friend" and choreograph giving low fives. Soon after in the high-profile 1943 all-star Black film Stormy Weather, Cab Calloway receives a double low five from The Nicholas Brothers as they begin their dance number to Calloway's song "Jumpin' Jive". Fred Astaire later told the Nicholas Brothers that the "Jumpin' Jive" dance sequence was "the greatest movie musical number he had ever seen".

== Variations ==
Variations that evolved in the black community include five on the black hand side (giving skin on the darker outer hand side) and five on the sly (a low five behind the back).

== See also ==
- High five
