= The Room Upstairs =

1987 American made-for-television drama film

- Genre: Drama
- Based on: The Room Upstairs by Norma Levinson
- Written by: Steve Lawson
- Directed by: Stuart Margolin
- Starring: Stockard Channing; Sam Waterston; Linda Hunt; Joan Allen; Clancy Brown; Sarah Jessica Parker; James Handy; Jerry O'Connell; De'voreaux White
- Theme music composer: Robert Folk
- Country of origin: United States
- Original language: English

Production
- Executive producer: Marian Rees
- Producer: Robert Huddleston
- Cinematography: Ron Hagen
- Editor: Kurt Bullinger
- Running time: 98 min
- Production companies: Marian Rees Associates; Hallmark Hall of Fame; The Alexander Group Productions

Original release
- Network: CBS
- Release: January 31, 1987

Related
- Promise (film)

The Room Upstairs is a 1987 American made-for-television drama film based on the novel The Room Upstairs by Norma Levinson, starring Stockard Channing, Sam Waterston, Joan Allen and Linda Hunt. The young Jerry O'Connell, Devoreaux White and Sarah Jessica Parker all have small supporting roles. The film aired as a Hallmark Hall of Fame presentation on CBS on January 31, 1987 and was later distributed on DVD.

== Plot ==
Leah Lazenby (Stockard Channing) is a single woman who lives in a house recently inherited from her parents. In order to earn money to maintain the house, she lets the other rooms and sleeps in the parlor. Leah works in a school for children with learning disabilities and mental illnesses, including antisocial personality disorder.

A cellist named Travis Coles (Sam Waterston) inquires about the upstairs room to let. He can easily pay in advance and is immediately accepted.

Travis fits in very well. He flatters Leah when she's plumbing, helps the other tenants, takes photographs of Leah and her pupils, drives her around in his car, and defends her when she is assaulted by her tenant Kevin (Clancy Brown). Leah turns to Travis when she needs to take Kevin's wife, Ellie (Joan Allen), to a hospital after a suicide attempt.

Leah's head teacher, Mrs. Sanders (Linda Hunt), assigns her to look after an unruly, illiterate teenage girl named Susan (Renée Estevez), who refuses to attend school. Susan lives with her boyfriend. Leah visits her regularly and tries to teach her to read by using fashion magazines. She includes Susan's boyfriend. Leah thinks Susan is responding to her efforts, but then Susan plays a cruel trick on Leah. Leah loses her patience and starts a physical fight with Susan in public. When the police arrive, Susan falsely accuses Leah of assaulting her with a broken bottle and Leah leaves.

Returning home Leah sees Travis repairing the sink and vents her frustration at him. Travis responds that she mustn't believe she is the only person who is hurt, and she should be more interested in Ellie's problems. Leah talks to Ellie and they become friends.

Mrs. Sanders convinces Leah not to quit her job as a teacher and offers her a different task. While Travis is on a concert tour in Canada, Leah's pregnant tenant, Mandy (Sarah Jessica Parker), gives birth. There is a big celebration in Leah's house and Travis manages to visit during a break in the tour.

Romance develops between Travis and Leah. Leah tells him about her new case, a deafblind child. She falls asleep on his shoulder. Travis tells the sleeping Leah about his secret tragedy. He had a child who died while he was on tour, and his wife accused him of neglecting his family.

Leah's brother Frank (James Handy) is angry with her because the house is returning a puny profit although she's now also her tenant Mandy's babysitter. Leah refuses her brother's offer to buy her out.

Travis takes Leah to one of his concerts. When they return to the house, she invites him to her room where she has prepared a meal for them. They kiss.
