= David Debin =

American writer and former producer

David Debin (born July 22, 1942 - died October 2, 2025) was an American writer and former producer.

His father was a New York talent agent who discovered Michael Bennett and other well-known Broadway personalities.

== Career ==
=== Musicals ===
After graduating from Adelphi University, Debin began his own career as an Equity Stage Manager for touring musical comedies such as Camelot, with Howard Keel and Jon Voight; Top Banana, with Milton Berle; Guys and Dolls, with Dan Dailey; Tovarich, with Eva Gabor and Jean Pierre Aumont; Kiss Me Kate, with Patrice Munsell; and How To Succeed In Business Without Really Trying, with Rudy Vallee. Later, he teamed with Oscar and Grammy-winning composer, Paul Jabara and Dreamgirls lyricist Tom Eyen, to write lyrics for the musical Rachel Lilly Rosenblum and Don't You Forget It, produced on Broadway by Ahmet Ertegun and Robert Stigwood.

=== Hollywood ===
His career in Hollywood began as a writer/producer for The Dating Game and The Newlywed Game. He sold his first screenplay, Dick Tracy, to Universal, and his second, Goldie and the Boxer, to NBC. Under the banner of the company, he formed with wife Stockard Channing, he went on to produce The Stockard Channing Show for CBS; Starmaker, a miniseries starring Rock Hudson and Melanie Griffith for NBC; A Gun in the House with Sally Struthers and Silent Victory: The Kitty O'Neil Story with Channing, both movies for CBS. Later, he served as writer-producer of the sitcom Everything's Relative, starring Jason Alexander, for Columbia and CBS; and writer/producer of The Heat, starring Billy Campbell, for MGM and CBS. He also wrote episodes for TV shows such as Hearts of the West, and Sweating Bullets. At various times, he was a feature screenwriter under contract to Disney, Warner Brothers, MGM and 20th Century Fox.

In 2012, he co-wrote and co-produced a comedy pilot for Mexican TV, The Mexico City Angels, about a Mexican professional soccer team.

=== Writing ===
In 1992, Random House published his first novel, the Albie Marx mystery, Nice Guys Finish Dead. Two subsequent Albie Marx novels, The Big O and Murder Live At Five, were published by Carroll & Graf. Writing under the pseudonym "Smith and Doe" with co-author Philip Mittleman, he published three books of nonfiction with St. Martin's Press, among them the bestseller What Men Don't Want Women To Know. He is a member of the Writers Guild of America, the Mystery Writers of America and the Author's Guild.

== Death ==
David passed away on October 2, 2025, aged 83.

== Selected works ==
=== Fiction ===
- Nice Guys Finish Dead
- The Big O
- Murder Live At Five
