= Just Friends (TV series) =

- Genre: Sitcom
- Created by: Nick Arnold; Eric Cohen
- Starring: Stockard Channing; Gerrit Graham; Mimi Kennedy; Lou Crisculo; Sydney Goldsmith
- Theme music composer: Delaney Bramlett
- Opening theme: "Brand New Life"
- Country of origin: United States
- Original language: English
- No. of seasons: 1
- No. of episodes: 13

Production
- Executive producer: David Debin
- Producers: Al Rogers; Peter Locke
- Production locations: CBS Television City; Hollywood, California; Goldenwest Videotape Division; Hollywood California
- Camera setup: Multi-camera
- Running time: 22–24 minutes
- Production company: Little Bear Productions

Original release
- Network: CBS
- Release: March 4 – June 24, 1979

Related
- The Stockard Channing Show

Just Friends is an American sitcom television series that aired on CBS from March 4, 1979 to June 24, 1979.

Stockard Channing, an accomplished stage actress who had entered the national consciousness with her role as Betty Rizzo in Grease a year prior, was the lead. Gerrit Graham, Mimi Kennedy, Lou Crisculo and Sydney Goldsmith co-starred with her on the series.

A year after Just Friends had ended, Channing starred in her self-titled The Stockard Channing Show. Ostensibly, the two series were set in different fictional universes with different character names but were largely identical in premise, with an identical home set, with Channing speaking in interviews as if the two shows were two seasons of the same series.

== Plot ==
This series revolves around health spa assistant manager Susan Hughes, whose marriage is falling apart.

== Cast ==
- Stockard Channing as Susan Hughes
- Gerrit Graham as Leonard Scribner
- Mimi Kennedy as Victoria Chasen
- Lou Crisculo as Milt D'Angelo
- Sydney Goldsmith as Coral
- Joan Tolentino as Mrs. Fischer
- Albert Insinnia as Angelo D'Angelo
- Liz Torres as Miranda D'Angelo
- Rhonda Foxx as Mrs. Blanchard
- Linda Rose as Miss Yarnell

== Production ==
The pilot for Just Friends was videotaped before a live studio audience at CBS Television City in Hollywood in November 1978. Production relocated to the Goldenwest Videotape Division also in Hollywood for the rest of the series. The series ranked 26th for the season with an average household share of 20.2.

The following season, The Stockard Channing Show replaced Just Friends.

== Episodes ==
No.	Title	Original release date
1	"Pilot"	March 4, 1979
Susan Hughes is a Bostonian who is estranged from her husband and takes a job in a health spa in Los Angeles.
2	"Last of the Red Hot Tubs"	March 11, 1979
Susan is determined to clean up her credit rating, so she buys a hot tub from Leonard.
3	"Invasion of the Body Grabber"	March 18, 1979
Susan is put an uncomfortable spot when her sister's husband makes a pass.
4	"The Boy in the Band"	March 25, 1979
Susan and Coral discover that Leonard is a member of a gay health club.
5	"Health May Be Hazardous"	April 1, 1979
Milt is persuaded to advertise his health spa on TV, but decides to give up the spa when one of his clients dies.
6	"Lost Weekend"	April 8, 1979
Susan's estranged husband convinces her to attend a weekend of "sensitivity programming" with him.
7	"Same Time, Next Night"	April 15, 1979
Milt asks Susan to give him samba lessons, but this leads to everyone thinking they're having an affair - including his wife, Miranda.
8	"Room at the Top"	April 22, 1979
Susan seeks any and all advice on how to discourage the attentions of a crazy new neighbor.
9	"Funny Thing Happened"	April 29, 1979
Susan gets an offer from a handsome spa owner that she can't turn down, until she learns there are strings attached.
10	"The Ziegenfuss Force"	May 6, 1979
Susan and Leonard decide to write a movie script together.
11	"A Fine Romance"	June 10, 1979
For the first time since her divorce, Susan meets a man that she would like to be more than "just friends" with.
12	"A Little Fright Music"	June 17, 1979
Victoria is visited by an old flame while her husband is out of town.
13	"The Hollywood Syndrome"	June 24, 1979
Susan finds herself not only the victim of a bank computer error, but also the hostage of a bank robber.

== Home release ==
10 of the 13 episodes of Just Friends were released on DVD in 2006 by the Canadian company Visual Entertainment as part of the DVD set of Channing's following series, The Stockard Channing Show.
