= 1979–80 United States network television schedule =

The following is the 1979–80 network television schedule for the three major English language commercial broadcast networks in the United States. The schedule covers primetime hours from September 1979 through August 1980. The schedule is followed by a list per network of returning series, new series, and series cancelled after the 1978–79 season. All times are Eastern and Pacific, with certain exceptions, such as Monday Night Football.

New fall series are highlighted in bold.

Each of the 30 highest-rated shows is listed with its rank and rating as determined by Nielsen Media Research.

Lime indicates the number-one watched program for the season.
Yellow indicates the programs in the top 10 for the season.
Cyan indicates the programs in the top 20 for the season.
Magenta indicates the programs in the top 30 for the season.

Other Legend

- Light blue indicates local programming.
- Gray indicates shows repeats or encore programming.
- Blue-gray indicates news programming.
- Light green indicates sporting events.
- Red indicates series being burned off and other irregularly scheduled programs, including specials and movies.

PBS, the Public Broadcasting Service, was in operation but the schedule was set by each local station.

== Sunday ==
Network		7:00 PM	7:30 PM	8:00 PM	8:30 PM	9:00 PM	9:30 PM	10:00 PM	10:30 PM
ABC	Fall	**Out of the Blue**	**A New Kind of Family**	Mork & Mindy (27/20.2)	**The Associates**	The ABC Sunday Night Movie (29/20.0) (Tied with Tenspeed and Brown Shoe, Vega$ and Knots Landing)			
ABC	Mid-fall	Salvage 1		Mork & Mindy (27/20.2)	**The Associates**	The ABC Sunday Night Movie (29/20.0) (Tied with Tenspeed and Brown Shoe, Vega$ and Knots Landing)			
ABC	Winter	**Galactica 1980**		**Tenspeed and Brown Shoe** (29/20.0) (Tied with The ABC Sunday Night Movie, Vega$ and Knots Landing)		The ABC Sunday Night Movie (29/20.0) (Tied with Tenspeed and Brown Shoe, Vega$ and Knots Landing)			
ABC	Spring	**Galactica 1980**		**Tenspeed and Brown Shoe** (29/20.0) (Tied with The ABC Sunday Night Movie, Vega$ and Knots Landing)		The ABC Sunday Night Movie (29/20.0) (Tied with Tenspeed and Brown Shoe, Vega$ and Knots Landing)			
ABC	Summer	**Galactica 1980**		**When the Whistle Blows** (R)		The ABC Sunday Night Movie (29/20.0) (Tied with Tenspeed and Brown Shoe, Vega$ and Knots Landing)			
CBS		60 Minutes (1/28.4)		**Archie Bunker's Place*** (11/22.9)	One Day at a Time (10/23.0)	Alice (4/25.3) (Tied with M*A*S*H)	The Jeffersons (8/24.3)	**Trapper John, M.D.** (19/21.2)	
NBC	Fall	The Wonderful World of Disney		The Big Event				Prime Time Sunday	
NBC	Winter	The Wonderful World of Disney		The Big Event				Prime Time Sunday	
NBC	Spring	The Wonderful World of Disney		The Big Event				Prime Time Sunday	
NBC	Summer	The Wonderful World of Disney		CHiPs (R)		The Big Event			

(*) Served as a continuation/spin-off of All in the Family.

== Monday ==
Network		8:00 PM	8:30 PM	9:00 PM	9:30 PM	10:00 PM	10:30 PM
ABC	Fall	**240-Robert**		Monday Night Football			
ABC	Winter	Various programming		The ABC Monday Night Movie			
ABC	Mid-winter	Laverne & Shirley	Angie	**Stone**		Family	
ABC	Spring	**That's Incredible!** (3/25.8)		Family		**Stone**	
ABC	Summer	**One in a Million** (R)	Monday Night Baseball				
CBS	Fall	The White Shadow		M*A*S*H (4/25.3) (Tied with Alice)	WKRP in Cincinnati (22/20.7)	Lou Grant	
CBS	Winter	The White Shadow		M*A*S*H (4/25.3) (Tied with Alice)	**House Calls** (14/22.1) (Tied with Real People)	Lou Grant	
CBS	Mid-winter	WKRP in Cincinnati (22/20.7)	**The Last Resort**	M*A*S*H (4/25.3) (Tied with Alice)	**House Calls** (14/22.1) (Tied with Real People)	Lou Grant	
CBS	Spring	WKRP in Cincinnati (22/20.7)	**The Stockard Channing Show**	M*A*S*H (4/25.3) (Tied with Alice)	**Flo** (7/24.4)	Lou Grant	
CBS	Summer	WKRP in Cincinnati (22/20.7)	**Phyl & Mikhy**	M*A*S*H (4/25.3) (Tied with Alice)	**House Calls** (14/22.1) (Tied with Real People)	Lou Grant	
NBC		Little House on the Prairie (16/21.8)		NBC Monday Night at the Movies			

== Tuesday ==
Network		8:00 PM	8:30 PM	9:00 PM	9:30 PM	10:00 PM	10:30 PM
ABC	Fall	Happy Days (17/21.7)	Angie	Three's Company (2/26.3)	Taxi (13/22.4)	The Lazarus Syndrome	
ABC	Mid-fall	Happy Days (17/21.7)	Angie	Three's Company (2/26.3)	Taxi (13/22.4)	Hart to Hart	
ABC	Winter	Happy Days (17/21.7)	**One in a Million**	Three's Company (2/26.3)	Taxi (13/22.4)	Hart to Hart	
ABC	Mid-winter	Happy Days (17/21.7)	**Goodtime Girls**	Three's Company (2/26.3)	Taxi (13/22.4)	Hart to Hart	
ABC	Spring	Happy Days (17/21.7)	Laverne & Shirley	Three's Company (2/26.3)	Taxi (13/22.4)	Hart to Hart	
ABC	Summer	Happy Days (17/21.7)	Laverne & Shirley	Three's Company (2/26.3)	Taxi (13/22.4)	**Hart to Hart**	
CBS	Fall	**California Fever**		The CBS Tuesday Night Movie			
CBS	Mid-fall	**California Fever**		Hawaii Five-O		Paris	
CBS	Winter	The White Shadow		Hawaii Five-O		Paris	
CBS	Mid-winter	The White Shadow		The CBS Tuesday Night Movie			
CBS	Spring	The White Shadow		The CBS Tuesday Night Movie			
CBS	Summer	The White Shadow		The CBS Tuesday Night Movie			
NBC	Fall	**The Misadventures of Sheriff Lobo**		NBC Tuesday Night at the Movies			
NBC	Winter	**The Misadventures of Sheriff Lobo**		NBC Tuesday Night at the Movies			
NBC	Spring	**The Misadventures of Sheriff Lobo**		**The Big Show**			**United States**
NBC	Summer	**The Misadventures of Sheriff Lobo**		**The Big Show**			**United States**

== Wednesday ==
Network		8:00 PM	8:30 PM	9:00 PM	9:30 PM	10:00 PM	10:30 PM
ABC	Fall	Eight Is Enough (12/22.8)		Charlie's Angels (20/20.9) (Tied with Barney Miller)		Vega$ (29/20.0) (Tied with Tenspeed and Brown Shoe, The ABC Sunday Night Movie and Knots Landing)	
ABC	Winter	Eight Is Enough (12/22.8)		Charlie's Angels (20/20.9) (Tied with Barney Miller)		Vega$ (29/20.0) (Tied with Tenspeed and Brown Shoe, The ABC Sunday Night Movie and Knots Landing)	
ABC	Spring	Eight Is Enough (12/22.8)		Charlie's Angels (20/20.9) (Tied with Barney Miller)		Vega$ (29/20.0) (Tied with Tenspeed and Brown Shoe, The ABC Sunday Night Movie and Knots Landing)	
ABC	Summer	Family		Charlie's Angels (20/20.9) (Tied with Barney Miller)		Vega$ (29/20.0) (Tied with Tenspeed and Brown Shoe, The ABC Sunday Night Movie and Knots Landing)	
ABC	Mid-summer	Various programming				20/20	
CBS	Fall	**The Last Resort**	**Struck by Lightning**	The CBS Wednesday Night Movie			
CBS	Mid-fall	**The Last Resort**	The Bad News Bears	The CBS Wednesday Night Movie			
CBS	Late fall	**Young Maverick**		The CBS Wednesday Night Movie			
CBS	Winter	**Young Maverick**		The CBS Wednesday Night Movie			
CBS	Spring	**Beyond Westworld**		The CBS Wednesday Night Movie			
CBS	Summer	**Beyond Westworld**		The CBS Wednesday Night Movie			
NBC	Fall	Real People (14/22.1) (Tied with House Calls)		Diff'rent Strokes (26/20.3)	Hello, Larry	**The Best of Saturday Night Live** (R)	
NBC	Winter	Real People (14/22.1) (Tied with House Calls)		Diff'rent Strokes (26/20.3)	Hello, Larry	**The Best of Saturday Night Live** (R)	
NBC	Spring	Real People (14/22.1) (Tied with House Calls)		Diff'rent Strokes (26/20.3)	Hello, Larry	**From Here to Eternity**	
NBC	Summer	Real People (14/22.1) (Tied with House Calls)		Diff'rent Strokes (26/20.3)	**The Facts of Life**	Quincy, M.E. (R)	

== Thursday ==
Network		8:00 PM	8:30 PM	9:00 PM	9:30 PM	10:00 PM	10:30 PM
ABC	Fall	Laverne & Shirley	**Benson** (23/20.6) (Tied with The Love Boat)	Barney Miller (20/20.9) (Tied with Charlie's Angels)	Soap (25/20.5)	20/20	
ABC	Winter	Mork & Mindy (27/20.2)	**Benson** (23/20.6) (Tied with The Love Boat)	Barney Miller (20/20.9) (Tied with Charlie's Angels)	Soap (25/20.5)	20/20	
ABC	Spring	Mork & Mindy (27/20.2)	**Benson** (23/20.6) (Tied with The Love Boat)	Barney Miller (20/20.9) (Tied with Charlie's Angels)	**The Associates**	20/20	
ABC	Mid-spring	Mork & Mindy (27/20.2)	**Benson** (23/20.6) (Tied with The Love Boat)	Barney Miller (20/20.9) (Tied with Charlie's Angels)	The Ropers	20/20	
ABC	Summer	Mork & Mindy (27/20.2)	Angie	Barney Miller (20/20.9) (Tied with Charlie's Angels)	**Nobody's Perfect**	20/20	
CBS	Fall	The Waltons		Hawaii Five-O		Barnaby Jones	
CBS	Winter	The Waltons		Barnaby Jones		**Knots Landing** (29/20.0) (Tied with Tenspeed and Brown Shoe, The ABC Sunday Night Movie and Vega$)	
CBS	Spring	**Palmerstown, U.S.A.**		Barnaby Jones		**The Contender**	
CBS	Summer	The Waltons		Barnaby Jones		**The Contender**	
NBC	Fall	**Buck Rogers in the 25th Century**		Quincy, M.E.		Kate Loves a Mystery*	
NBC	Winter	**Buck Rogers in the 25th Century**		Quincy, M.E.		**Skag**	
NBC	Spring	**Buck Rogers in the 25th Century**		Quincy, M.E.		The Rockford Files (R)	
NBC	Summer	**Buck Rogers in the 25th Century**		NBC Thursday Night at the Movies			
NBC	Mid-summer	**Games People Play**		NBC Thursday Night at the Movies			

(*) Formerly known as Mrs. Columbo

== Friday ==
Network		8:00 PM	8:30 PM	9:00 PM	9:30 PM	10:00 PM	10:30 PM
ABC	Fall	Fantasy Island (28/20.1)		The ABC Friday Night Movie			
ABC	Winter	**B.A.D. Cats**		The ABC Friday Night Movie			
ABC	Spring	**When the Whistle Blows**		The ABC Friday Night Movie			
ABC	Summer	The ABC Friday Night Movie				**Tenspeed and Brown Shoe** (R)	
ABC	Mid-summer	**Benson** (R)	**Goodtime Girls**	The ABC Friday Night Movie			
CBS		The Incredible Hulk		The Dukes of Hazzard (9/24.1)		Dallas (6/25.0)	
NBC
NBC	Fall	**Shirley**		The Rockford Files		**Eischied**	
NBC	Winter	**Shirley**		NBC Friday Night at the Movies			
NBC	Mid-winter	Special programming		NBC Friday Night at the Movies			
NBC	Spring	**Here's Boomer**	**The Facts of Life**	Various programming		**Pink Lady**	
NBC	Summer	**Here's Boomer**	**Me and Maxx**	The Rockford Files		Various programming	
NBC	Late summer	Various programming				**Speak Up America**	

== Saturday ==
Network		8:00 PM	8:30 PM	9:00 PM	9:30 PM	10:00 PM	10:30 PM
ABC	Fall	The Ropers	**Detective School**	The Love Boat (23/20.6) (Tied with Benson)		**Hart to Hart**	
ABC	Mid-fall	The Ropers	**Detective School**	The Love Boat (23/20.6) (Tied with Benson)		Fantasy Island (28/20.1)	
ABC	Late fall	The Ropers	**A New Kind of Family**	The Love Boat (23/20.6) (Tied with Benson)		Fantasy Island (28/20.1)	
ABC	Winter	**One in a Million**	The Ropers	The Love Boat (23/20.6) (Tied with Benson)		Fantasy Island (28/20.1)	
ABC	Spring	Angie	**Goodtime Girls**	The Love Boat (23/20.6) (Tied with Benson)		Fantasy Island (28/20.1)	
ABC	Summer	Various programming		The Love Boat (23/20.6) (Tied with Benson)		**When the Whistle Blows**	
ABC	Mid-summer	Various programming		The Love Boat (23/20.6) (Tied with Benson)		Fantasy Island (28/20.1)	
CBS	Fall	**Working Stiffs**	The Bad News Bears	**Big Shamus, Little Shamus**		**Paris**	
CBS	Follow-up	Various programming		CBS Saturday Movie			
CBS	Winter	The Chisholms		CBS Saturday Movie			
CBS	Spring	**The Tim Conway Show**		Hawaii Five-O		**Hagen**	
CBS	Mid-spring	**The Tim Conway Show**		CBS Saturday Movie			
CBS	Summer	The Bad News Bears	**The Stockard Channing Show**	CBS Saturday Movie			
CBS	Mid-summer	One Day at a Time (R)	The Bad News Bears	CBS Saturday Movie			
CBS	Late summer	**Universe**		CBS Saturday Movie			
NBC	Fall	CHiPs (18/21.5)		B. J. and the Bear		**A Man Called Sloane**	
NBC	Winter	CHiPs (18/21.5)		B. J. and the Bear		**Prime Time Saturday**	
NBC	Spring	B. J. and the Bear		**Sanford**	**Me and Maxx**	**Prime Time Saturday**	
NBC	Mid-spring	B. J. and the Bear		**Sanford**	**Joe's World**	**Prime Time Saturday**	
NBC	Summer	**Buck Rogers in the 25th Century** (R)		Various programming		**Joe's World**	**Good Time Harry**

Note: In November 1979, CBS took Paris off their Saturday night lineup before scheduling it in the 10:00-11:00 pm time slot on Tuesdays beginning December 4.

== By network ==
=== ABC ===
**Returning Series**

- 20/20
- The ABC Friday Night Movie
- The ABC Monday Night Movie
- ABC NFL Monday Night Football
- The ABC Sunday Night Movie
- Angie
- Barney Miller
- Charlie's Angels
- Eight Is Enough
- Family
- Fantasy Island
- Happy Days
- Laverne & Shirley
- The Love Boat
- Monday Night Baseball
- Mork & Mindy
- The Ropers
- Salvage 1
- Soap
- Taxi
- Three's Company
- Vega$

**New Series**

- **240-Robert**
- **The Associates**
- **B.A.D. Cats** *
- **Benson**
- **Detective School**
- **Galactica 1980** *
- **Goodtime Girls** *
- **Hart to Hart**
- **The Lazarus Syndrome**
- **A New Kind of Family**
- **Nobody's Perfect** *
- **One in a Million** *
- **Out of the Blue** *
- **Stone** *
- **Tenspeed and Brown Shoe** *
- **That's Incredible!** *
- **When the Whistle Blows** *

Not returning from 1978–79:

- 13 Queens Boulevard
- Apple Pie
- Battlestar Galactica
- Carol Burnett & Company
- Carter Country
- Delta House
- Doctors' Private Lives
- Donny & Marie
- Friends
- The Hardy Boys Mysteries
- How the West Was Won
- Lucan
- The MacKenzies of Paradise Cove
- Makin' It
- Operation Petticoat
- Starsky & Hutch
- Welcome Back, Kotter
- What's Happening!!

=== CBS ===
**Returning Series**

- 60 Minutes
- Alice
- The Bad News Bears
- Barnaby Jones
- The Chisholms
- Dallas
- The Dukes of Hazzard
- Hawaii Five-O
- The Incredible Hulk
- The Jeffersons
- Lou Grant
- M*A*S*H
- One Day at a Time
- The Waltons
- The White Shadow
- WKRP in Cincinnati

**New Series**

- **Archie Bunker's Place**
- **Beyond Westworld** *
- **Big Shamus, Little Shamus**
- **California Fever**
- **The Contender** *
- **Flo** *
- **Hagen** *
- **House Calls** *
- **Knots Landing**
- **The Last Resort**
- **Palmerstown, U.S.A.** *
- **Paris**
- **Phyl & Mikhy** *
- **The Stockard Channing Show** *
- **Struck by Lightning**
- **That's My Line** *
- **The Tim Conway Show** *
- **Trapper John, M.D.**
- **Universe** *
- **Walter Cronkite's Universe** *
- **Working Stiffs**
- **Young Maverick**

Not returning from 1978–79:

- All in the Family
- The Amazing Spider-Man
- The American Girls
- Billy
- Dorothy
- Flatbush
- Flying High
- Good Times
- Hanging In
- In the Beginning
- Just Friends
- Kaz
- Married: The First Year
- Mary
- The Mary Tyler Moore Hour
- Miss Winslow and Son
- Moses the Lawgiver
- The New Adventures of Wonder Woman
- The Paper Chase
- Rhoda
- Time Express

=== NBC ===
**Returning Series**

- B.J. and the Bear
- The Big Event
- CHiPs
- Diff'rent Strokes
- Disney's Wonderful World
- Hello, Larry
- Kate Loves a Mystery
- Little House on the Prairie
- NBC Monday Night at the Movies
- Quincy, M.E.
- Real People
- The Rockford Files

**New Series**

- **The Big Show** *
- **Buck Rogers in the 25th Century**
- **Eischied**
- **The Facts of Life** *
- **From Here to Eternity** *
- **Good Time Harry** *
- **Here's Boomer** *
- **Joe's World** *
- **A Man Called Sloane**
- **Me and Maxx** *
- **The Misadventures of Sheriff Lobo**
- **Pink Lady**
- **Sanford** *
- **The Six O'Clock Follies** *
- **Skag** *
- **Shirley**
- **United States** *

Not returning from 1978–79:

- Brothers and Sisters
- Cliffhangers
- Comedy Theatre
- David Cassidy: Man Undercover
- Dick Clark's Live Wednesday
- The Eddie Capra Mysteries
- Grandpa Goes to Washington
- Harris and Company
- Highcliffe Manor
- Hizzonner
- Joe & Valerie
- Laugh-In
- Lifeline
- Presenting Susan Anton
- Project U.F.O.
- The Runaways
- Supertrain
- $weepstake$
- Sword of Justice
- Turnabout
- W.E.B.
- The Waverly Wonders
- Weekend
- Who's Watching the Kids
- Whodunnit?
- The Wonderful World of Disney

Note: The * indicates that the program was introduced in midseason.

== Additional sources ==
- Castleman, H. & Podrazik, W. (1982). Watching TV: Four Decades of American Television. New York: McGraw-Hill. 314 pp.
- McNeil, Alex. Total Television. Fourth edition. New York: Penguin Books. ISBN 0-14-024916-8.
- Brooks, Tim & Marsh, Earle (1985). The Complete Directory to Prime Time Network TV Shows (3rd ed.). New York: Ballantine. ISBN 0-345-31864-1.
