= 1979 in American television =

In 1979, television in the United States saw a number of significant events, including the debuts, finales, and cancellations of television shows; the launch, closure, and rebranding of channels; changes and additions to network affiliations by stations; controversies, business transactions, and carriage disputes; and the deaths of individuals who had made notable contributions to the medium.

== Events ==
Date	Event
January 3	The USA Network is founded.
January 10	The Music for UNICEF Concert is televised from New York City on NBC.
February 11	In the U.S., 43 million viewers watch Elvis, an ABC movie starring Kurt Russell as Elvis Presley, despite being the first Elvis biopic film ever made.
February 18	The Daytona 500 is broadcast live from start to finish, in its entirety for the very first time by CBS. It was won by Richard Petty.
February 20	On CBS, Melody Thomas makes her first appearance as Nikki Reed on The Young and the Restless.
March 5	KSTP-TV in Saint Paul, Minnesota ends its 31-year relationship as the Twin Cities' NBC affiliate and joins ABC in what is called the network's biggest coup yet. NBC, meanwhile, aligns with Metromedia-owned independent station WTCN-TV, while former ABC affiliate KMSP-TV, having failed to procure an NBC affiliation, becomes independent itself.
March 6	On NBC, Another World becomes the only soap opera to air regularly scheduled 90-minute telecasts (it would go back to 60-minute episodes in 1980). Meanwhile, on ABC, Family Feud increases its goal to 300 points.
March 19	C-SPAN, an American television channel focusing on government and public affairs, is launched.
April 1	Nickelodeon is founded.
April 8	On CBS, the final episode of All in the Family is seen by 40.2 million American viewers (it will relaunch the following season as Archie Bunker's Place).
April 20	The 1,439th and final CBS episode of Match Game 79 airs – however, the show didn't air on April 5, causing the Friday episode from that week to air on April 9. The last 9 aired episodes were culled together from 3 separate taping sessions, leaving 6 unaired until Game Show Network aired them for the first time. Match Game continues for 3 more years in syndicated daytime (sans the omnipresent 2-year designation in the title).
April 22	Friendly Fire, an ABC movie starring Carol Burnett as a mother who wants to know how her son died in Vietnam, airs.
April 23	The game show Whew!, hosted by Tom Kennedy, premieres on CBS. The new daytime programme airs at 10:30 am, leading to the hour-long game show The Price Is Right moving thirty minutes later, at 11:00 am, which is the time slot that it still holds to this day. As a result, soap opera Love of Life is relegated to 4:00 pm, taking over this timeslot from cancelled game show Match Game 79. In addition, the noon slot, held until then by The Young and the Restless, is given to local stations, with the latter soap opera moving to 1:00 pm.
May 16	On ABC, Kate Jackson makes her final appearance as Sabrina Duncan on Charlie's Angels.
May 17	The Season 5 finale of Barney Miller on ABC features the cast stepping out of character to pay tribute to the late Jack Soo, who played detective Nick Yemana. Soo, who died of cancer on January 11, 1979, made his final appearance in the series in the season's ninth episode, "The Vandal".
May 26	Dan Aykroyd and John Belushi's make their final appearances on NBC's Saturday Night Live as cast members.
June 1	In Indianapolis, Indiana, NBC affiliate WRTV swaps affiliations with ABC affiliate WTHR, citing a stronger affiliation (at the time, NBC is in last place among the three major networks).
July 10	KSD-TV, NBC affiliate in St. Louis, changes its call sign to KSDK-TV.
July 30	The Satellite Program Network (SPN) is founded.
September 7	ESPN, an all-sports channel, launches and becomes the first cable TV channel to be launched as a 24-hour channel.
September 9	KNXV-TV goes on the air for the first time as Phoenix's first UHF station, airing with ONTV. It was soon stripped off ONTV in 1983, eventually going first with Fox in 1986, then to ABC via an affiliation agreement with Scripps Howard in 1995.
September 12	On the two-hour season four premiere of Charlie's Angels on ABC, Shelley Hack is introduced as new angel Tiffany Welles, replacing Sabrina Duncan played by Kate Jackson.
September 19	On the two-hour Eight Is Enough season premiere on ABC, both David and Susan Bradford married their respective loves in a double ceremony.
September 22	On ABC, The character Scrappy-Doo makes his first appearance in the Scooby-Doo franchise. Scrappy-Doo would become a mainstay in the franchise going into the following decade.
September 25	Don Knotts makes his first appearance as Ralph Furley on the ABC sitcom Three's Company following the departures of Norman Fell and Audra Lindley (who portrayed Stanley and Helen Roper respectively), who went off to star in their very own spin-off series, The Ropers.
October 6	KTAB-TV in Abilene, Texas begins broadcasting as a CBS affiliate, taking that affiliation from KTXS-TV. KTXS-TV then elevates its secondary ABC affiliation to full-time status, making Abilene one of the last markets in the country to receive full service from the three major networks.
November 4	Jaws is broadcast on television for the first time on ABC.
November 9	SIN broadcasts the final of the 2nd National OTI-SIN Festival live from San Antonio.
November 18	Rob Reiner and Sally Struthers guest star as Mike and Gloria Stivic on the CBS sitcom Archie Bunker's Place. This would mark the final time that the original ensemble from All in the Family—Carroll O'Connor, Jean Stapleton, Sally Struthers and Rob Reiner—appeared together.
November 25	Pat Summerall calls his first NFL telecast (Minnesota Vikings–Tampa Bay Buccaneers) with John Madden.
December 1	The Movie Channel, an American premium cable channel, begins broadcasting movies 24/7. The first movie to air was Roman Holiday.
December 9	On the CBS sitcom Archie Bunker's Place, which as previously mentioned, is a direct continuation of All in the Family, Jean Stapleton makes her final appearance as Edith Bunker.

== Programs ==
=== Debuting this year ===
Date	Show	Network
January 8	All Star Secrets	NBC
January 8	Password Plus	NBC
January 18	Delta House	ABC
January 20	Salvage 1	ABC
January 21	Brothers and Sisters	NBC
January 22	Nightly Business Report	PBS
January 26	Hello, Larry	NBC
January 26	$weepstake$	NBC
January 26	Turnabout	NBC
January 26	The Dukes of Hazzard	CBS
January 28	CBS News Sunday Morning	CBS
February 1	Makin' It	ABC
February 3	The New Fred and Barney Show	NBC
February 7	Supertrain	NBC
February 8	Angie	ABC
February 20	This Old House	PBS
February 26	Billy	CBS
February 26	Flatbush	CBS
February 27	Cliffhangers	NBC
March 4	Stockard Channing in Just Friends	CBS
March 13	The Ropers	ABC
March 15	Harris and Company	NBC
March 24	The Bad News Bears	CBS
March 28	Dear Detective	ABC
April 6	The MacKenzies of Paradise Cove	ABC
April 12	Highcliffe Manor	NBC
April 12	Whodunnit?	NBC
April 18	Real People	NBC
April 23	Whew!	CBS
May 10	Hizzonner	NBC
May 24	Comedy Theatre (returning from 1976)	NBC
July 31	Detective School	ABC
August 24	The Facts of Life	NBC
August 25	Hart to Hart	ABC
August 28	240-Robert	ABC
September 1	Lap Quilting with Georgia Bonesteel	PBS
September 1	The Woodwright's Shop	PBS
September 7	SportsCenter	ESPN
September 8	Fred and Barney Meet the Thing	NBC
September 9	Jason of Star Command	CBS
September 9	Out of the Blue	ABC
September 13	Benson	ABC
September 15	Working Stiffs	CBS
September 16	A New Kind of Family	ABC
September 17	Three's a Crowd	Syndication
September 18	The Misadventures of Sheriff Lobo	NBC
September 19	The Last Resort	CBS
September 19	Struck by Lightning	CBS
September 20	Buck Rogers in the 25th Century	NBC
September 21	Eischied	NBC
September 22	Casper and the Angels	NBC
September 22	A Man Called Sloane	NBC
September 22	The New Adventures of Flash Gordon	NBC
September 22	The New Shmoo	NBC
September 22	The Super Globetrotters	NBC
September 22	Scooby-Doo and Scrappy-Doo	ABC
September 22	Spider-Woman	ABC
September 23	The Associates	ABC
September 23	Archie Bunker's Place	CBS
September 25	California Fever	CBS
September 25	Trapper John, M.D.	CBS
September 29	Big Shamus, Little Shamus	CBS
September 29	Paris	CBS
October 26	Shirley	NBC
October 29	Freedom Road	NBC
November 8	Nightline (debuting as The Iran Crisis–America Held Hostage)	ABC
November 28	Young Maverick	CBS
December 17	House Calls	CBS
December 27	Knots Landing	CBS

=== Ending this year ===
Date	Show	Debut
January 12	The Eddie Capra Mysteries	1978
January 14	The Hardy Boys/Nancy Drew Mysteries	1977
January 16	Grandpa Goes to Washington	1978
January 21	Lamp Unto My Feet	1948
March 2	Jeopardy! (returned in 1984)	1964
March 16	Makin' It	1979
March 30	$weepstake$	1979
March 30	Turnabout	1979
April 8	All in the Family	1971
April 24	The Paper Chase (returned in 1983)	1978
April 28	What's Happening!! (returned in 1985)	1976
April 29	Battlestar Galactica (returned in 1980)	1978
May 15	Starsky and Hutch	1975
May 17	Whodunnit?	1979
May 18	Rhoda	1974
June 8	Welcome Back, Kotter	1975
June 23	Stockard Channing in Just Friends	1979
June 28	Comedy Theatre	1976
June 29	Operation Petticoat	1977
July 6	The Amazing Spider-Man	1977
July 11	Sword of Justice	1978
July 12	David Cassidy: Man Undercover	1978
August 1	Good Times	1974
September 11	Wonder Woman	1976
October 20	The New Fred and Barney Show	1979
November 24	Detective School	1979
December 8	Godzilla	1978

=== Made-for-TV movies and miniseries ===
Title	Network	Premiere date
Backstairs at the White House	NBC	January 29
Murder by Natural Causes	CBS	February 17
Roots: The Next Generations	ABC	February 18 (7 episodes)
Survival of Dana	CBS	May 29
Death Car on the Freeway	CBS	September 25
All Quiet on the Western Front	CBS	November 14
Salem's Lot	CBS	November 17 and 24
Rudolph and Frosty's Christmas in July	ABC	November 25
The Berenstain Bears' Christmas Tree	NBC	December 3
The Miracle Worker	NBC	October 14

== Networks and services ==
=== Launches ===
Network	Type	Launch date	Notes	Source
Christian Television Network	Cable television	Unknown		
National Christian Network	Cable television	Unknown		
C-SPAN	Cable television	March 19		
Take 2	Cable television	April 1		
Galavision	Cable television	April 2		
Cornerstone Television	Cable television	April 15		
Satellite Program Network	Cable television	July 30		
ESPN	Cable television	September 7		

=== Conversions and rebrandings ===
Old network	New network	Type	Conversion date	Notes	Source
WTCG-TV	SuperStation WTBS	Cable television	Unknown		
C-3	Nickelodeon	Cable television	April 1		
Star Channel	The Movie Channel	Cable television	December 1		

=== Closures ===
There are no closures for Cable and satellite television channels in this year.

== Television stations ==
=== Sign-ons ===
Date	City of License/Market	Station	Channel	Affiliation	Notes/Ref.
January 3	Boston, Massachusetts	WQTV	68	Independent	
January 12	Matamoros, Tamaulipas, Mexico (Brownsville/McAllen, Texas, United States)	XHRIO-TV	2	English-language independent	
March	North Platte, Nebraska	K57CZ	57	CBS	LPTV translator of KOLN/Lincoln, Nebraska; now KNPL-LD channel 10, a semi-satellite of KOLN
April 15	Greensburg/Pittsburgh, Pennsylvania	WPCB-TV	40	Religious independent	
April 28	Red Deer/Harrisburg, Pennsylvania	WGCB	49	Independent	
May 3	Austin, Texas	KLRU	18	PBS	Originally a satellite of KLRN/San Antonio, Texas
June 1	Springfield, Illinois	WBHW	55	Independent	
June 12	Charlottesville, Virginia	W64AO	64	ABC	Low-powered translator of WHSV-TV/Harrisonburg, Virginia
June 18	Bismarck, North Dakota	KBME-TV	3	PBS	Part of Prairie Public Television
August	El Paso, Texas	KCIK-TV	14	Religious independent	
August 10	Denver, Colorado	KDVR	31	Independent	
September 2	Flagstaff/Phoenix, Arizona	KTVW	33	SIN	
September 9	Paducah, Kentucky	WKPD	29	PBS	This station was previously on the air 1971-1975 as commercial independent station WDXR-TV; it returned to the air as a satellite of WKLE/Lexington as part of the Kentucky Educational Television network.
September 9	Phoenix, Arizona	KNXV-TV	15	Independent	
September 24	Greensboro, North Carolina	WGNN-TV	45	Independent	
September 24	Norfolk, Virginia	WTVZ-TV	33	Independent	
October 6	Abilene, Texas	KTAB-TV	32	CBS	
October 22	Grand Junction, Colorado	KJCT	8	ABC	
October 24	Tampa, Florida	WCLF	22	CTN	
October 28	Oklahoma City, Oklahoma	KGMC	34	Independent	
December 22	Warrensburg/Sedalia, Missouri (Columbia/Jefferson City)	KMOS-TV	6	PBS	Returned to the air after being taken off the air in 1978 as a CBS affiliate
Unknown date	Hartford, Connecticut	W61AH	51	SIN	Translator of WXTV/New York City
Unknown date	Miami, Florida	W56AZ	56	PBS	Translator of WPBT-TV

=== Network affiliation changes ===
Date	City of License/Market	Station	Channel	Old affiliation	New affiliation	Notes/Ref.
March 5	Minneapolis/St. Paul, Minnesota	KMSP-TV	9	ABC	Independent	
March 5	Minneapolis/St. Paul, Minnesota	KSTP-TV	5	NBC	ABC	
March 5	Minneapolis/St. Paul, Minnesota	WTCN-TV	11	Independent	NBC	
June 1	Indianapolis, Indiana	WRTV-TV	6	NBC	ABC	
June 1	Indianapolis, Indiana	WTHR-TV	13	ABC	NBC	
October 6	Abilene, Texas	KTXS-TV	12	CBS (primary); ABC (secondary)	ABC (exclusive)	

== Births ==
Date	Name	Notability
January 2	Erica Hubbard	Actress (The Replacements, Lincoln Heights)
January 3	Lyriq Bent	Actor
January 4	Cindy Vela	Actress
January 4	Jeannie Mai	Host
January 6	Cristela Alonzo	Actress
January 8	Sarah Polley	Actress (Ramona, Road to Avonlea)
January 8	Windell Middlebrooks	Actor (died 2015)
January 9	Joshua Harto	Actor (That's So Raven)
January 13	Jill Wagner	Actress
January 14	James Scott	British actor (All My Children, Days of Our Lives)
January 16	Aaliyah	Singer (died 2001)
January 24	Ricardo Medina Jr.	Actor (Power Rangers Wild Force)
January 24	Tatyana Ali	Actress (The Fresh Prince of Bel-Air)
January 25	Christine Lakin	Actress (Step by Step)
January 26	Sara Rue	Actress (Less than Perfect)
January 28	Angelique Cabral	Actress
January 29	Jedediah Bila	Host
January 29	Jeremy Coon	Editor
January 30	Michelle Langstone	New Zealand actress (Power Rangers S.P.D.)
February 1	Rachelle Lefevre	Canadian actress (Under the Dome)
February 2	Mayer Hawthorne	Singer
February 3	Costa Ronin	Actor
February 4	Tabitha Brown	Actress
February 4	Jodi Shilling	Actress
February 7	Cerina Vincent	Actress (Stuck in the Middle)
February 8	Josh Keaton	Voice actor (Bratz, The Spectacular Spider-Man, Green Lantern: The Animated Series, DC Super Hero Girls, Voltron: Legendary Defender, Justice League Action, Ben 10)
February 11	Brandy Norwood	Singer and actress (Moesha, The Game)
February 12	Jesse Spencer	Australian actor (House, Chicago Fire)
February 13	Mena Suvari	Actress
February 15	Steven Boyer	Actor
February 17	Conrad Ricamora	Actor (How to Get Away with Murder) and singer
February 17	Bear McCreary	Composer
February 18	Tyrone D. Burton	Actor (The Parent 'Hood)
February 20	Bianca Lawson	Actress (Pretty Little Liars)
February 21	Jennifer Love Hewitt	Actress (Party of Five, Ghost Whisperer) and singer
February 21	Jordan Peele	Actor and comedian (Mad TV, Key & Peele)
February 21	Tituss Burgess	Actor
February 23	Maryke Hendrikse	Voice actress (Johnny Test)
February 23	S. E. Cupp	American television host
February 25	Jennifer Ferrin	Actress
February 26	Corinne Bailey Rae	Singer
February 26	Shalim Ortiz	Singer
February 27	Spero Dedes	Sportcaster
February 28	Chris Hayes	Anchor
March 5	Riki Lindhome	Voice actress (Monsters vs. Aliens)
March 7	Stephanie Anne Mills	Canadian actress (My Dad the Rock Star, Total Drama, Sidekick)
March 9	Oscar Isaac	Actor
March 10	Danny Pudi	Actor (Community, DuckTales)
March 10	Edi Gathegi	Actor
March 12	Rhys Coiro	Actor
March 15	Pollyanna McIntosh	Actress
March 17	Stephen Kramer Glickman	Canadian actor (Big Time Rush)
March 17	Stormy Daniels	Actress
March 17	Coco Austin	Actress
March 18	Danneel Ackles	Actress (One Life to Live, One Tree Hill)
March 18	Adam Levine	Singer
March 19	Joe Hursley	Actor
March 20	Daniel Cormier	Martial artist and commentator (UFC)
March 21	Melissa Gorga	American television personality
March 24	Lake Bell	Actress (How to Make it in America, Boston Legal)
March 25	Lee Pace	Actor (Pushing Daisies)
March 26	Heidi Zeigler	Actress (Rags to Riches, Just the Ten of Us)
March 30	Jose Pablo Cantillo	Actor
March 30	Pete Holmes	Actor
March 31	Sasha Dobson	Singer
April 1	Matt Silverstein	Writer
April 2	Lindy Booth	Canadian actress
April 2	Jesse Carmichael	American musician
April 4	Heath Ledger	Australian actor (Sweat) (died 2008)
April 4	Natasha Lyonne	Actress
April 6	Clay Travis	Host
April 7	Adam Gubman	Composer
April 9	Keshia Knight Pulliam	Actress (The Cosby Show)
April 11	Josh Server	Actor (All That)
April 12	Claire Danes	Actress (Homeland)
April 12	Jennifer Morrison	Actress (House, Once Upon a Time)
April 15	Luke Evans	Actor
April 15	Karen David	Actress
April 16	Tom Segura	Actor
April 18	Kourtney Kardashian	Actress (Keeping Up with the Kardashians)
April 18	Reena Ninan	American television journalist
April 18	Ayman Mohyeldin	American television journalist
April 19	Kate Hudson	Actress
April 21	James McAvoy	Actor
April 23	Jaime King	Actress (Hart of Dixie)
April 26	Ally Musika	Writer
May 3	Emily V. Gordon	Writer
May 4	Lance Bass	Actor
May 5	Vincent Kartheiser	Actor (Mad Men)
May 6	Akbar Gbaja-Biamila	Football player
May 9	Rosario Dawson	Actor (Gemini Division)
May 9	Andrew W.K.	Actor
May 11	Mary Elizabeth Ellis	Actress
May 13	Mickey Madden	Singer
May 16	Jessica Morris	Actress (One Life to Live)
May 19	Kyle Carrozza	Voice actor (Mighty Magiswords)
May 20	Craig Melvin	American broadcast journalist
May 22	Maggie Q	Actress (Nikita, Stalker) and model
May 24	Tracy McGrady	NBA basketball player
May 25	Corbin Allred	Actor (Teen Angel)
May 26	Elisabeth Harnois	Actress (CSI: Crime Scene Investigation)
May 26	Ashley Massaro	TV host (died 2019)
May 28	Jesse Bradford	Actor
May 28	Kal Parekh	Actor
May 30	Jenny Mollen	Actress
June 2	Morena Baccarin	Actress (Homeland)
June 2	James Ransone	Actor
June 5	Pete Wentz	American musician (Fall Out Boy)
June 7	Anna Torv	Actress (Fringe)
June 11	Preslaysa Edwards	Actress (The Mystery Files of Shelby Woo)
June 12	Earl Watson	NBA basketball player
June 14	Osvaldo Benavides	Actor
June 17	Young Maylay	Rapper
June 21	Chris Pratt	Actor (Everwood, Parks and Recreation)
June 22	Paul Campbell	Actor
June 22	Jai Rodriguez	Actor
June 23	Linzie Janis	American television journalist
June 24	Mindy Kaling	Actress (The Office, The Mindy Project)
June 25	Busy Philipps	Actress (Dawson's Creek, Freaks and Geeks, Cougar Town)
June 26	Julia Benson	Canadian actress (Stargate Universe)
June 26	Ryan Tedder	Singer
June 27	Cazwell	Rapper
June 28	Felicia Day	Actress (The Guild)
June 30	Rick Gonzalez	Actor (Reaper, Arrow)
June 30	Christopher Jacot	Actor
June 30	Lynn Smith	American journalist
July 2	Tom Llamas	American journalist
July 3	Elizabeth Hendrickson	Actress (All My Children)
July 4	Kevin Thoms	Actor
July 6	Kevin Hart	Actor
July 6	Moshe Kasher	Actor
July 11	Jax Taylor	Actor
July 12	Brooke Baldwin	American journalist
July 12	Omid Abtahi	American actor
July 14	Scott Porter	Actor (Hart of Dixie)
July 15	Philipp Karner	Actor
July 15	Laura Benanti	Actress
July 16	Jayma Mays	Actress (Heroes, Ugly Betty, Glee, The League, The Millers, Trial & Error)
July 17	Mike Vogel	Actor (Under the Dome)
July 18	Jason Weaver	Actor (Smart Guy) and singer
July 22	Parvesh Cheena	Actor
July 23	Michelle Williams	Actress
July 24	Rose Byrne	Actress
July 25	Juan Pablo Di Pace	Actor
July 26	Mageina Tovah	Actress
July 26	Tamyra Gray	Singer and Actress (American Idol, Boston Public)
July 26	Juliet Rylance	Actress
July 31	B. J. Novak	Actor (Ryan Howard on The Office)
August 1	Jason Momoa	Actor (Stargate Atlantis, Game of Thrones)
August 3	Danso Gordon	Canadian actor (In a Heartbeat, South of Nowhere)
August 3	Evangeline Lilly	Canadian actress (Lost)
August 3	Sarah Haskins	Comedian
August 7	Eric Johnson	Canadian actor (Smallville, Rookie Blue)
August 10	JoAnna Garcia	Actress (Are You Afraid of the Dark?, Freaks and Geeks, Reba, Privileged, Better with You, The Astronaut Wives Club)
August 11	Drew Nelson	Canadian actor (Girlstuff/Boystuff, Total Drama)
August 11	Rob Kerkovich	Actor (NCIS: New Orleans)
August 12	Peter Browngardt	Voice actor (Secret Mountain Fort Awesome, Uncle Grandpa)
August 12	Keith Powell	Actor
August 15	Jennifer Finnigan	Actress (The Bold and the Beautiful, Close to Home, Better with You, Tyrant)
August 22	Peter Shukoff	Comedian
August 22	Steve Kornacki	Host
August 22	Brandon Adams	Actor
August 23	Clare Grant	Actress
August 26	Erik Valdez	Actor (General Hospital, Graceland, Superman & Lois)
August 27	Aaron Paul	Actor
August 28	Shane Van Dyke	Actor
August 30	Marin Ireland	Actress
August 31	Yara Martinez	Actor
September 1	Camille Chen	Actress
September 2	Jonathan Kite	Actor
September 4	Max Greenfield	Actor (New Girl)
September 5	Stacey Dales	Broadcaster
September 7	Andrew Catalon	Broadcaster
September 8	Pink	Singer
September 9	Nikki DeLoach	Actress (Awkward)
September 11	Cameron Richardson	Actress
September 11	Ariana Richards	Actress
September 12	Jay McGraw	Writer
September 15	Dave Annable	Actor (Brothers & Sisters, 666 Park Avenue, Red Band Society, Heartbeat)
September 15	Amy Davidson	Actress (8 Simple Rules)
September 16	Flo Rida	Rapper
September 18	Alison Lohman	Actress (Pasadena)
September 18	Amna Nawaz	Journalist (PBS NewsHour)
September 20	Chris Tardio	Actor
September 22	Michael Graziadei	Actor
September 24	Erin Chambers	Actress (General Hospital)
September 24	Justin Bruening	Actor (All My Children)
September 24	Ross Mathews	TV host
September 25	Rashad Evans	American retired mixed martial artist
September 26	Nick Weidenfeld	Producer
September 27	Alicyn Packard	Voice actress (The Mr. Men Show. The Tom And Jerry Show)
September 28	Bam Margera	Professional skateboarder and stunt performer (Jackass, Viva La Bam)
September 28	Anndi McAfee	Voice actress (Hey Arnold!, Recess, Lloyd in Space)
September 28	Mara Schiavocampo	American journalist
September 30	Mike Damus	Actor (Teen Angel, Brutally Normal, Men, Women & Dogs, Trust Me)
October 2	Brianna Brown	Actress (General Hospital, Devious Maids)
October 3	Claudia Bassols	Actress
October 3	Matt Davis	Comedian
October 3	John Morrison	Actor
October 3	Josh Klinghoffer	Musician
October 4	Rachael Leigh Cook	Actress (Perception)
October 4	Caitriona Balfe	Irish actress (Outlander)
October 7	Aaron Ashmore	Canadian actors and brothers
October 7	Shawn Ashmore	Canadian actors and brothers
October 8	Kristanna Loken	Actress and model (Painkiller Jane)
October 9	Brandon Routh	Actor (Arrow, Legends of Tomorrow)
October 9	Alex Greenwald	Actor
October 9	Chris O'Dowd	Actor
October 10	Mýa	Actress
October 14	Stacy Keibler	Actress
October 15	Jaci Velasquez	Actress
October 17	Deanna Russo	Actress
October 18	Ne-Yo	Singer and actor
October 19	Angela Sun	American journalist
October 20	John Krasinski	Actor (Jim Halpert on The Office)
October 22	Tony Denman	Actor
October 22	Nina Parker	American television journalist
October 25	Sarah Thompson	Actress (Angel, 7th Heaven)
October 26	Jonathan Chase	Actor
October 29	Andrew-Lee Potts	Actor
October 31	Erica Cerra	Actress
November 2	Erika Flores	Actress (Dr. Quinn, Medicine Woman)
November 5	Leonardo Nam	Actor
November 6	Lamar Odom	NBA basketball player
November 6	Adam LaRoche	Baseball player
November 6	Brad Stuart	Hockey player
November 7	Jon Peter Lewis	Singer (American Idol, The Voice)
November 8	Dania Ramirez	Dominican-American actress (Entourage, Heroes, Devious Maids, Once Upon a Time)
November 9	Darren Trumeter	Actor
November 12	Cote de Pablo	Chilean-American actress (NCIS)
November 13	Henry Wolfe	Actor, singer and son of Meryl Streep and Don Gummer
November 13	Metta World Peace	NBA basketball player
November 14	Olga Kurylenko	Actress
November 17	Azita Ghanizada	American actress
November 18	Nate Parker	American actor
November 19	Barry Jenkins	American screenwriter
November 19	Michelle Vieth	American actress
November 20	Jacob Pitts	American actor
November 22	Josh Cooke	American actor
November 23	Jonathan Sadowski	Actor ($#*! My Dad Says, Young & Hungry)
November 23	Kelly Brook	Model and actress (Smallville)
November 25	Jerry Ferrara	American actor
November 25	Joel Kinnaman	Actor
November 28	Daniel Henney	American actor
November 28	Brian Nolan	American actor
November 28	Chamillionaire	American rapper
November 29	The Game	American rapper
November 29	Simon Amstell	Presenter
November 30	Diego Klattenhoff	Canadian actor (Homeland, The Blacklist)
December 2	Melissa Archer	Actress (One Life to Live)
December 3	Tiffany Haddish	Actress (The Carmichael Show)
December 3	Rainbow Sun Francks	Actor
December 5	Nick Stahl	Actor
December 7	Eric Bauza	Canadian voice actor (Coconut Fred's Fruit Salad Island, El Tigre: The Adventures of Manny Rivera, The Fairly OddParents, The Looney Tunes Show, Ben 10: Omniverse, Xiaolin Chronicles, Uncle Grandpa, Breadwinners, New Looney Tunes, Atomic Puppet, Mighty Magiswords, Ben 10, Unikitty, Muppet Babies, Legend of the Three Caballeros, Rise of the Teenage Mutant Ninja Turtles)
December 7	Jennifer Carpenter	Actress
December 7	Sara Bareilles	Actress
December 8	Nick Thune	Actor
December 8	Ingrid Michaelson	Actress
December 11	Rider Strong	Actor (Boy Meets World, Kim Possible, Girl Meets World, Star vs. the Forces of Evil)
December 13	Kimee Balmilero	Actress
December 15	Adam Brody	Actor (The O.C.)
December 16	Brodie Lee	Pro wrestler (WWE, AEW) (died 2020)
December 16	Trevor Immelman	Golfer
December 17	Jaimee Foxworth	Actress (Family Matters)
December 17	Lil Rel Howery	Actor
December 18	Emily Swallow	Actress
December 19	Tara Summers	English actress (Boston Legal)
December 21	Rutina Wesley	Actress (True Blood)
December 23	Holly Madison	Model
December 26	Chris Daughtry	Singer (American Idol)
December 28	Bree Williamson	Actress (One Life to Live)
December 28	André Holland	Actor
December 28	Bree Williamson	Actress
December 29	Ariel Schrag	Writer
December 29	Diego Luna	Actor
December 30	Catherine Taber	Voice actress (Star Wars: The Clone Wars, The Loud House)
December 31	Elaine Cassidy	Actress

== Deaths ==
Date	Name	Age	Notability
January 11	Jack Soo	61	Actor (Nick Yemana on Barney Miller)
January 16	Ted Cassidy	46	Actor (Lurch on The Addams Family)
January 27	Dick Wesson	59	Actor, announcer (The Wonderful World of Disney)
June 2	Jim Hutton	45	Actor (Ellery Queen)
June 22	Hope Summers	83	Actress (Clara Edwards on The Andy Griffith Show)
July 11	James Underwood Crockett	63	Author, gardener, and television host (Crockett's Victory Garden)
July 29	Bill Todman	62	Game show producer (Match Game, What's My Line?)
August 17	Vivian Vance	70	Actress (Ethel Mertz on I Love Lucy)
November 1	Mamie Eisenhower	82	First Lady of the United States and spouse of President Dwight D. Eisenhower
November 30	Zeppo Marx	78	Actor and comedian

== See also ==
- 1979 in the United States
- List of American films of 1979
