= 1978–79 United States network television schedule =

The following is the 1978–79 network television schedule for the three major English language commercial broadcast networks in the United States. The schedule covers primetime hours from September 1978 through August 1979. The schedule is followed by a list per network of returning series, new series, and series cancelled after the 1977–78 season. All times are Eastern and Pacific, with certain exceptions, such as Monday Night Football.

New fall series are highlighted in bold. Series ending their original runs are in italics.

Each of the 30 highest-rated shows is listed with its rank and rating as determined by Nielsen Media Research.

Lime indicates the number-one watched program for the season.
Yellow indicates the programs in the top 10 for the season.
Cyan indicates the programs in the top 20 for the season.
Magenta indicates the programs in the top 30 for the season.

Other Legend

- Light blue indicates local programming.
- Gray indicates shows repeats or encore programming.
- Blue-gray indicates news programming.
- Light green indicates sporting events.
- Red indicates series being burned off and other irregularly scheduled programs, including specials and movies.

PBS is not included; member stations have local flexibility over most of their schedules and broadcast times for network shows may vary.

== Sunday ==
Network		7:00 PM	7:30 PM	8:00 PM	8:30 PM	9:00 PM	9:30 PM	10:00 PM	10:30 PM
ABC	Fall	The Hardy Boys		**Battlestar Galactica**		The ABC Sunday Night Movie (16/22.7)			
ABC	Winter	**The Osmond Family Hour**		**Battlestar Galactica**		The ABC Sunday Night Movie (16/22.7)			
ABC	Spring	**Friends**		**Battlestar Galactica**		The ABC Sunday Night Movie (16/22.7)			
ABC	Mid-spring	**The Osmond Family Hour**		**Battlestar Galactica**		The ABC Sunday Night Movie (16/22.7)			
ABC	Summer	**The Osmond Family Hour**		**Salvage 1** (R)		The ABC Sunday Night Movie (16/22.7)			
CBS	Fall	60 Minutes (8/25.4)		**Mary**		All in the Family (9/25.2)	Alice (13/23.8)	**Kaz**	
CBS	Mid-fall	60 Minutes (8/25.4)		All in the Family (9/25.2)	Alice (13/23.8)	**Kaz**		Dallas	
CBS	Winter	60 Minutes (8/25.4)		All in the Family (9/25.2)	Alice (13/23.8)	CBS Sunday Night Movie (23/20.7) (Tied with Vega$ and Just Friends)			
CBS	Spring	60 Minutes (8/25.4)		All in the Family (9/25.2)	One Day at a Time (18/21.6) (Tied with Soap)	Alice (13/23.8)	**Just Friends** (23/20.7) (Tied with Vega$ and the CBS Sunday Night Movie)	**The Mary Tyler Moore Hour**	
CBS	Summer	60 Minutes (8/25.4)		All in the Family (9/25.2)	One Day at a Time (18/21.6) (Tied with Soap)	Alice (13/23.8)	The Jeffersons (R)	Moses the Lawgiver (R)	
CBS	Mid-summer	60 Minutes (8/25.4)		All in the Family (9/25.2)	One Day at a Time (18/21.6) (Tied with Soap)	Alice (13/23.8)	The Jeffersons (R)	**Kaz**	
NBC	Fall	The Wonderful World of Disney		The Big Event				**Lifeline**	
NBC	Winter	The Wonderful World of Disney		The Big Event				Weekend	
NBC	Spring	The Wonderful World of Disney		The Big Event				Weekend	
NBC	Summer	The Wonderful World of Disney		The Big Event				Weekend	

Notes: On CBS, the premiere (and only) episode of Co-Ed Fever aired on February 4 from 10:30 to 11:00 p.m., after which the show was cancelled. Moses the Lawgiver was a rerun of the 1975 miniseries. Mr. Dugan was supposed to premiere March 11, 1979 between All in the Family and Alice but due to black Congressmembers' criticism of it after a preview for them, the show was never broadcast. On NBC, the Centennial miniseries aired as part of The Big Event; the show itself reached #28 at the end of the season, with 20.3 rating.

== Monday ==
Network		8:00 PM	8:30 PM	9:00 PM	9:30 PM	10:00 PM	10:30 PM
ABC	Fall	Welcome Back, Kotter	Operation Petticoat	Monday Night Football			
ABC	Mid-fall	Lucan		Monday Night Football			
ABC	Winter	**Salvage 1**		How the West Was Won			
ABC	Spring	**Salvage 1**		How the West Was Won			
ABC	Summer	Monday Night Baseball					
CBS	Fall	**WKRP in Cincinnati**	**People**	M*A*S*H (7/25.4)	One Day at a Time (18/21.6) (Tied with Soap)	Lou Grant	
CBS	Mid-fall	**The White Shadow**		M*A*S*H (7/25.4)	One Day at a Time (18/21.6) (Tied with Soap)	Lou Grant	
CBS	Winter	**Billy**	**Flatbush**	M*A*S*H (7/25.4)	**WKRP in Cincinnati**	Lou Grant	
CBS	Spring	**The White Shadow**		M*A*S*H (7/25.4)	**WKRP in Cincinnati**	Lou Grant	
CBS	Summer	**The White Shadow**		M*A*S*H (7/25.4)	**WKRP in Cincinnati**	Lou Grant	
NBC		Little House on the Prairie (14/23.3)		NBC Monday Night at the Movies (21/21.0)			

== Tuesday ==
Network		8:00 PM	8:30 PM	9:00 PM	9:30 PM	10:00 PM	10:30 PM
ABC	Fall	Happy Days (3/29.1)	Laverne & Shirley (1/30.6)	Three's Company (2/30.2)	**Taxi** (11/24.9) (Tied with Eight is Enough)	Starsky & Hutch	
ABC	Winter	Happy Days (3/29.1)	Laverne & Shirley (1/30.6)	Three's Company (2/30.2)	**Taxi** (11/24.9) (Tied with Eight is Enough)	Starsky & Hutch	
ABC	Spring	Happy Days (3/29.1)	Laverne & Shirley (1/30.6)	Three's Company (2/30.2)	**Taxi** (11/24.9) (Tied with Eight is Enough)	**The Ropers** (6/25.6)	**13 Queens Boulevard** (26/20.5) (Tied with Barnaby Jones)
ABC	Summer	Happy Days (3/29.1)	**Detective School**	Three's Company (2/30.2)	**Taxi** (11/24.9) (Tied with Eight is Enough)	**The Ropers** (6/25.6)	**13 Queens Boulevard** (26/20.5) (Tied with Barnaby Jones)
CBS		**The Paper Chase**		CBS Tuesday Night Movie			
NBC	Fall	**Grandpa Goes to Washington**		The Big Event			
NBC	Winter	**Cliffhangers**		The Big Event			
NBC	Spring	**Cliffhangers**		The Big Event			
NBC	Summer	The Runaways		The Big Event			

== Wednesday ==
Network		8:00 PM	8:30 PM	9:00 PM	9:30 PM	10:00 PM	10:30 PM
ABC		Eight Is Enough (11/24.9) (Tied with Taxi)		Charlie's Angels (10/25.0)		**Vega$** (23/20.7) (Tied with Just Friends and the CBS Sunday Night Movie)	
CBS	Fall	The Jeffersons	**In the Beginning**	CBS Wednesday Night Movie			
CBS	Mid-fall	The Jeffersons	Good Times	CBS Wednesday Night Movie			
CBS	Winter	The Incredible Hulk		One Day at a Time (18/21.6) (Tied with Soap)	The Jeffersons	**Kaz**	
CBS	Mid-winter	The Amazing Spider-Man		One Day at a Time (18/21.6) (Tied with Soap)	The Jeffersons	**Kaz**	
CBS	Spring	**Married: The First Year**		One Day at a Time (18/21.6) (Tied with Soap)	The Jeffersons	**Kaz**	
CBS	Mid-spring	The Jeffersons	**Miss Winslow and Son**	**Dear Detective**		**Kaz**	
CBS	Summer	All in the Family (R)	Good Times	CBS Wednesday Night Movie			
CBS	Mid-summer	**Dorothy**	**Hanging In**	CBS Wednesday Night Movie			
NBC	Fall	**Dick Clark's Live Wednesday**		NBC Wednesday Night at the Movies			
NBC	Winter	**Supertrain**		**NBC Novels for Television**			
NBC	Spring	**Real People**		**NBC Novels for Television**			
NBC	Summer	Laugh-In (R)		Various programming			
NBC	Mid-summer	**Real People**		Various programming			

Notes: The Wheels segment of NBC Novels for Television was a rerun of the 1978 miniseries. Laugh-In consisted of reruns of the 1977 television series.

== Thursday ==
Network		8:00 PM	8:30 PM	9:00 PM	9:30 PM	10:00 PM	10:30 PM
ABC	Fall	**Mork & Mindy** (4/28.5)	What's Happening!! (29/20.1) (Tied with CHiPs)	Barney Miller (15/22.8)	Soap (18/21.6) (Tied with One Day at a Time)	Family	
ABC	Winter	**Mork & Mindy** (4/28.5)	**Angie** (5/27.1)	Barney Miller (15/22.8)	Soap (18/21.6) (Tied with One Day at a Time)	Family	
ABC	Spring	**Mork & Mindy** (4/28.5)	**Angie** (5/27.1)	Barney Miller (15/22.8)	Soap (18/21.6) (Tied with One Day at a Time)	**Doctors' Private Lives**	
ABC	Mid-spring	**Mork & Mindy** (4/28.5)	**Angie** (5/27.1)	Barney Miller (15/22.8)	Soap (18/21.6) (Tied with One Day at a Time)	Family	
ABC	Summer	**Mork & Mindy** (4/28.5)	**Angie** (5/27.1)	Barney Miller (15/22.8)	Soap (18/21.6) (Tied with One Day at a Time)	20/20	
CBS	Fall	The Waltons		Hawaii Five-O		Barnaby Jones (26/20.5) (Tied with 13 Queens Boulevard)	
CBS	Winter	The Waltons		Hawaii Five-O		Barnaby Jones (26/20.5) (Tied with 13 Queens Boulevard)	
CBS	Spring	**The Chisholms**		Hawaii Five-O		Barnaby Jones (26/20.5) (Tied with 13 Queens Boulevard)	
CBS	Mid-spring	**Time Express**		Hawaii Five-O		Barnaby Jones (26/20.5) (Tied with 13 Queens Boulevard)	
CBS	Summer	The Waltons		Hawaii Five-O		Barnaby Jones (26/20.5) (Tied with 13 Queens Boulevard)	
NBC	Fall	Project U.F.O.		Quincy, M.E.		**W.E.B.**	
NBC	Mid-fall	Project U.F.O.		Quincy, M.E.		**David Cassidy: Man Undercover**	
NBC	Winter	**Little Women**		Quincy, M.E.		**Mrs. Columbo**	
NBC	Late winter	**Harris and Company**		Quincy, M.E.		**Mrs. Columbo**	
NBC	Spring	**Whodunnit?**	**Highcliffe Manor**	Quincy, M.E.		**Presenting Susan Anton**	
NBC	Mid-spring	**Hizzonner**	**Whodunnit?**	Quincy, M.E.		**Presenting Susan Anton**	
NBC	Summer	**Hizzonner**	**Comedy Theatre**	Quincy, M.E.		**NBC Novels for Television**	
NBC	Mid-summer	Project U.F.O.		Quincy, M.E.		**David Cassidy: Man Undercover**	

Notes: Mork & Mindy had a one-hour premiere on September 14, 1978.

Comedy Theatre, an anthology series of unsold television pilots for situation comedies last seen in the summer of 1976, returned for its second and last season.

The NBC Novels for Television segment The Innocent and the Damned was a rerun of the 1977 television miniseries Aspen.

Coasttocoast was supposed to air Thursdays 10:00-11:00PM, but NBC's new boss, Fred Silverman, canceled the show.

== Friday ==
Network		8:00 PM	8:30 PM	9:00 PM	9:30 PM	10:00 PM	10:30 PM
ABC	Fall	Donny & Marie		The ABC Friday Night Movie			
ABC	Winter	**Makin' It**	What's Happening!! (29/20.1) (Tied with CHiPs)	The ABC Friday Night Movie			
ABC	Spring	Family		The ABC Friday Night Movie			
ABC	Mid-spring	**The MacKenzies of Paradise Cove**		The ABC Friday Night Movie			
ABC	Summer	Operation Petticoat (R)	Welcome Back, Kotter (R)	The ABC Friday Night Movie			
CBS	Fall	The New Adventures of Wonder Woman		The Incredible Hulk		**Flying High**	
CBS	Winter	The New Adventures of Wonder Woman		**The Dukes of Hazzard** (20/21.1)		Dallas	
CBS	Spring	The New Adventures of Wonder Woman		**The Dukes of Hazzard** (20/21.1)		Dallas	
CBS	Summer	The Incredible Hulk		**The Dukes of Hazzard** (20/21.1)		Dallas	
NBC	Fall	**The Waverly Wonders**	**Who's Watching the Kids?**	The Rockford Files		**The Eddie Capra Mysteries**	
NBC	Mid-fall	**Diff'rent Strokes**	**Who's Watching the Kids?**	The Rockford Files		**The Eddie Capra Mysteries**	
NBC	Winter	**Diff'rent Strokes**	Joe & Valerie	The Rockford Files		**The Eddie Capra Mysteries**	
NBC	Mid-winter	**Diff'rent Strokes**	**Brothers and Sisters**	**Turnabout**	**Hello, Larry**	$weepstake$	
NBC	Late winter	**Diff'rent Strokes**	**Hello, Larry**	**Brothers and Sisters**	**Turnabout**	$weepstake$	
NBC	Spring	**Diff'rent Strokes**	**Hello, Larry**	The Rockford Files		**The Duke**	
NBC	Summer	**Diff'rent Strokes**	**Hello, Larry**	The Rockford Files		**The Eddie Capra Mysteries**	
NBC	Late summer	**Hello, Larry**	**The Facts of Life**	Various programming			

== Saturday ==
Network		8:00 PM	8:30 PM	9:00 PM	9:30 PM	10:00 PM	10:30 PM
ABC	Fall	Carter Country	**Apple Pie**	The Love Boat (17/22.1)		Fantasy Island (22/20.8)	
ABC	Mid-fall	Welcome Back, Kotter	Carter Country	The Love Boat (17/22.1)		Fantasy Island (22/20.8)	
ABC	Winter	**Delta House**	Welcome Back, Kotter	The Love Boat (17/22.1)		Fantasy Island (22/20.8)	
ABC	Spring	What's Happening!! (29/20.1) (Tied with CHiPs)	**Delta House**	The Love Boat (17/22.1)		Fantasy Island (22/20.8)	
ABC	Summer	**Battlestar Galactica** (R)		The Love Boat (17/22.1)		Fantasy Island (22/20.8)	
ABC	Late summer	**Carol Burnett & Company**		The Love Boat (17/22.1)		Fantasy Island (22/20.8)	
CBS	Fall	Rhoda	Good Times	**The American Girls**		Dallas	
CBS	Winter	**The White Shadow**		CBS Saturday Movie			
CBS	Spring	**The Bad News Bears**	**Billy**	CBS Saturday Movie			
CBS	Summer	**The Bad News Bears**	**Billy**	CBS Saturday Movie			
NBC	Fall	CHiPs (29/20.1) (Tied with What's Happening!!)		Various programming		**Sword of Justice**	
NBC	Winter	CHiPs (29/20.1) (Tied with What's Happening!!)		**B. J. and the Bear**		The Rockford Files	
NBC	Spring	CHiPs (29/20.1) (Tied with What's Happening!!)		**B. J. and the Bear**		**Supertrain**	
NBC	Summer	CHiPs (29/20.1) (Tied with What's Happening!!)		**B. J. and the Bear**		**Supertrain**	

== By network ==
=== ABC ===
**Returning Series**

- 20/20
- The ABC Friday Night Movie
- The ABC Sunday Night Movie
- Barney Miller
- Carter Country
- Charlie's Angels
- Donny & Marie
- Eight Is Enough
- Family
- Fantasy Island
- Happy Days
- The Hardy Boys
- How the West Was Won
- Laverne & Shirley
- Lucan
- The Love Boat
- Monday Night Baseball
- Monday Night Football
- Operation Petticoat
- Soap
- Starsky & Hutch
- Three's Company
- Welcome Back, Kotter
- What's Happening!!

**New Series**

- **13 Queens Boulevard** *
- **Angie** *
- **Apple Pie**
- **Battlestar Galactica**
- **Carol Burnett & Company** *
- **Delta House** *
- **Detective School** *
- **Doctors' Private Lives** *
- **Friends** *
- **The MacKenzies of Paradise Cove** *
- **Makin' It** *
- **Mork & Mindy**
- **The Ropers** *
- **Salvage 1** *
- **Taxi**
- **Vega$**

Not returning from 1977–78:

- The ABC Monday Night Movie
- Baretta
- Fish
- Free Country
- The Harvey Korman Show
- A.E.S. Hudson Street
- Having Babies
- Mel & Susan Together
- The Redd Foxx Comedy Hour
- The San Pedro Beach Bums
- The Six Million Dollar Man
- Sugar Time!
- Tabitha

=== CBS ===
**Returning Series**

- 60 Minutes
- Alice
- All in the Family
- The Amazing Spider-Man
- Barnaby Jones
- Dallas
- Good Times
- Hawaii Five-O
- The Incredible Hulk
- The Jeffersons
- Lou Grant
- M*A*S*H
- One Day at a Time
- The New Adventures of Wonder Woman
- Rhoda
- The Waltons

**New Series**

- **The American Girls**
- **The Bad News Bears** *
- **Billy** *
- **The Chisholms** *
- **Dear Detective** *
- **Dorothy** *
- **The Dukes of Hazzard** *
- **Flatbush** *
- **Flying High**
- **Hanging In** *
- **In the Beginning**
- **Just Friends** *
- **Kaz**
- **Married: The First Year**
- **Mary**
- **The Mary Tyler Moore Hour** *
- **Miss Winslow and Son** *
- **The Paper Chase**
- **Time Express** *
- **The White Shadow**
- **WKRP in Cincinnati**

Not returning from 1977–78:

- Another Day
- Baby I'm Back
- The Betty White Show
- The Bob Newhart Show
- Busting Loose
- The Carol Burnett Show
- Celebrity Challenge of the Sexes
- The Fitzpatricks
- Husbands, Wives & Lovers
- Kojak
- Logan's Run
- Maude
- On Our Own
- Rafferty
- Sam
- The Shields and Yarnell Show
- Switch
- Szysznyk
- The Ted Knight Show
- The Tony Randall Show
- We've Got Each Other
- Young Dan'l Boone

=== NBC ===
**Returning Series**

- The Big Event
- CHiPs
- Comedy Theatre (returning from 1976)
- Joe & Valerie
- Laugh-In
- Little House on the Prairie
- NBC Monday Night at the Movies
- Project U.F.O.
- Quincy, M.E.
- The Rockford Files
- The Runaways
- Weekend
- The Wonderful World of Disney

**New Series**

- **B. J. and the Bear** *
- **Brothers and Sisters** *
- **Cliffhangers** *
- **David Cassidy: Man Undercover**
- **Dick Clark's Live Wednesday**
- **Diff'rent Strokes**
- **The Duke** *
- **The Eddie Capra Mysteries**
- **Grandpa Goes to Washington**
- **Harris and Company** *
- **Hello, Larry** *
- **Highcliffe Manor** *
- **Hizzonner** *
- **Lifeline**
- **Kate Loves a Mystery** *
- **Presenting Susan Anton** *
- **Real People** *
- **Supertrain** *
- $weepstake$ *
- **Sword of Justice**
- **Turnabout** *
- **W.E.B.**
- **The Waverly Wonders**
- **Who's Watching the Kids**
- **Whodunnit?** *

Not returning from 1977–78:

- Black Sheep Squadron
- Big Hawaii
- The Bionic Woman
- Chico and the Man
- Chuck Barris Rah Rah Show
- Columbo
- C.P.O. Sharkey
- The Hanna-Barbera Happy Hour
- James at 15
- The Life and Times of Grizzly Adams
- Man from Atlantis
- Mulligan's Stew
- The Oregon Trail
- Police Woman
- Quark
- The Richard Pryor Show
- Richie Brockelman, Private Eye
- Rollergirls
- Rosetti and Ryan
- Sanford Arms
- What Really Happened to the Class of '65?

Note: The * indicates that the program was introduced in midseason.

== Additional sources ==
- Castleman, H. & Podrazik, W. (1982). Watching TV: Four Decades of American Television. New York: McGraw-Hill. 314 pp.
- McNeil, Alex. Total Television. Fourth edition. New York: Penguin Books. ISBN 0-14-024916-8.
- Brooks, Tim & Marsh, Earle (1985). The Complete Directory to Prime Time Network TV Shows (3rd ed.). New York: Ballantine. ISBN 0-345-31864-1.
