= Top-rated United States television programs of 1979–80 =

This table displays the top-rated primetime television series of the 1979–80 season as measured by Nielsen Media Research.

Rank	Program	Network	Rating
1	60 Minutes	CBS	28.4
2	Three's Company	ABC	26.3
3	That's Incredible!	ABC	25.8
4	Alice	CBS	25.3
4	M*A*S*H	CBS	25.3
6	Dallas	CBS	25.0
7	Flo	CBS	24.4
8	The Jeffersons	CBS	24.3
9	The Dukes of Hazzard	CBS	24.1
10	One Day at a Time	CBS	23.0
11	Archie Bunker's Place	CBS	22.9
12	Eight Is Enough	ABC	22.8
13	Taxi	ABC	22.4
14	House Calls	CBS	22.1
14	Real People	NBC	22.1
16	Little House on the Prairie	NBC	21.8
17	Happy Days	ABC	21.7
18	CHiPs	NBC	21.5
19	Trapper John, M.D.	CBS	21.2
20	Charlie's Angels	ABC	20.9
20	Barney Miller	ABC	20.9
22	WKRP in Cincinnati	CBS	20.7
23	Benson	ABC	20.6
23	The Love Boat	ABC	20.6
25	Soap	ABC	20.5
26	Diff'rent Strokes	NBC	20.3
27	Mork & Mindy	ABC	20.2
28	Fantasy Island	ABC	20.1
29	Tenspeed and Brown Shoe	ABC	20.0
29	ABC Sunday Night Movie	ABC	20.0
29	Vega$	ABC	20.0
29	Knots Landing	CBS	20.0
