= Alvin Ganzer =

American film director

Alvin Ganzer (1911–2009) was an American film and television director.

== Early life ==
Ganzer was born in 1911 in Cold Spring, Minnesota.

== Career ==
As a young man, Ganzer moved to California, and in 1932 was given a job at Paramount Pictures in its casting department. He worked for Paramount as an assistant and second unit director on many feature films from 1934 through 1954. His first directorial feature film credit is for The Girls of Pleasure Island (1953); he had been assisting F. Hugh Herbert, who became ill during production. From 1954–1979 he was a prolific director of episodes for television series, and directed a handful of additional feature films.

== Personal life ==
He was married to Murial Ganzer, and they had a son Alvin, and a daughter, Carolynn Jacobs Finnegan, all of whom survived him.

He died on 3 January 2009, in Poʻipū, Hawaii, where he and his wife had moved about six years earlier to be close to their son.

== Selected filmography (as director) ==
- Midnight Serenade (short, 1947)
- Tropical Masquerade (short, 1948)
- Big Sister Blues (short, 1948)
- Catalina Interlude (short, 1948)
- The Girls of Pleasure Island (1953)
- The Leather Saint (1956)
- Country Music Holiday (1958)
- When the Boys Meet the Girls (1965)
- Three Bites of the Apple (1967)

== Selected television (as director) ==
- China Smith (1952)
- Science Fiction Theatre (1955)
- Highway Patrol (1955)
- Men into Space (1959)
- Route 66 (1963)
- The Man from U.N.C.L.E. (1964-1968)
- Please Don't Eat the Daisies (1965)
- Lost in Space (1965)
- Joe Forrester (1975)
- The Blue Knight (1975)
- Quincy, M.E. (1975)
- The Hardy Boys/Nancy Drew Mysteries (1977)
- The American Girls (1978)
- David Cassidy: Man Undercover (1978)
