= Bob Brunner =

American screenwriter and film producer

- Born: Robert Brunner; August 3, 1934; New York City, New York, U.S.
- Died: October 28, 2012 (aged 78); Northridge, California, U.S.
- Occupation(s): Screenwriter, film producer, television producer

Robert Brunner (August 3, 1934 – October 28, 2012) was an American screenwriter, film producer, and television producer. He frequently collaborated in film and television with Garry Marshall, the creator of Happy Days. Brunner is credited with creating the "Fonzie" nickname for Henry Winkler's character, Arthur Fonzarelli, on Happy Days. He also created one of Fonzie's key catchphrases, "Sit on it."

== Life and career ==
=== Early life ===
Brunner was born on August 3, 1934, in New York City. In 1959, Brunner met Garry Marshall while both were working at the New York Daily News as copyboys. He entered the entertainment industry during the early 1960s as a publicist for Louis Armstrong and Tony Bennett.

=== Film and television career ===
During the 1970s, Brunner began a career in television, teaming with longtime friend Garry Marshall as a scriptwriter and television producer. Brunner wrote for The Odd Couple, which Marshall was executive producing at the time. Brunner also worked on Marshall's Laverne & Shirley and Blansky's Beauties, which premiered in 1977 and was soon cancelled.

Brunner joined the production staff of Happy Days. He produced thirty-seven episodes of Happy Days and wrote or co-wrote fifteen episodes. He became an integral member of the production staff, including stints as its showrunner.

Notably, Brunner contributed to American popular culture by creating the nickname "Fonzie" for Henry Winkler's iconic character, Arthur Fonzarelli, who was originally just a minor player on the show. Brunner also created Fonzie's iconic phrase, "Sit on it," used by Fonzie as a comeback on the show. Fonzie, and his catchphrase, made Happy Days the number one show in the United States at the time.

More infamously, Brunner also wrote the 1977 Happy Days season premiere script which led to the phrase "Jump the shark," now used by television critics to criticize a television series deemed to have been on the air for too long. In the episode, first aired on September 20, 1977, Fonzie travels to Los Angeles to take a screen test and break into acting. When he ties with a local Californian in a water skiing competition, Fonzie has to jump over a shark in the water as a tiebreaker. The episode apparently led radio personality Jon Hein and his former college roommate to coin the term "jump the shark" to describe a television show in creative decline. Still, the episode was watched by 30 million viewers, proving to be a hit in the ratings. "Amazingly, I can't remember – which is frustrating, as I can usually watch a Happy Days episode from any season, hear a joke and recall who wrote it," in an account written by Fred Fox Jr.

Happy Days writer Fred Fox Jr. later wrote about the origin of "jump the shark" and the episode in an article published in the Los Angeles Times in September 2010: "My friend Brian Levant, then a talented new member of the writing staff, believes that Garry Marshall, the show's co-creator and executive producer, and Bob Brunner, the showrunner at the time, made the suggestion. But what I definitely remember is that no one protested vehemently; not one of us said, 'Fonzie, jump a shark? Are you out of your mind?"

In 1979, Brunner co-created (with Arthur Silver) and executive produced the short-lived NBC sitcom, Brothers and Sisters. That same year (1979), Brunner also created another quickly cancelled CBS show, Working Stiffs, starring James Belushi and Michael Keaton. He and Arthur Silver also developed the television adaptation of The Bad News Bears, which aired on CBS from 1979 to 1980. Brunner went on to executive produce a string of television shows, including Love, Sidney, Private Benjamin, Webster, and Diff'rent Strokes. Brunner was co-nominated for an Emmy for outstanding comedy series in 1982 for his work as the producer of Love, Sidney.

Brunner continued to collaborate with friend, Garry Marshall, on several of Marshall's films. He co-wrote the script for Marshall's 1999 romantic comedy, The Other Sister, starring Juliette Lewis and Giovanni Ribisi. He also contributed to Marshall's Frankie and Johnny in 1991 (In which Brunner also appeared on screen in a small role), Exit to Eden in 1994, and The Princess Diaries in 2001.

=== Death ===
Bob Brunner died of a heart attack near his residence in Northridge, California, on October 28, 2012, at the age of 78. He was survived by three children Robert Jr, Jennifer and Elizabeth – and six grandchildren. Brunner was buried at Forest Lawn - Hollywood Hills Cemetery next to his wife, Ann, who died in 1987.
