= Matt Davis (comedian) =

American stand up comedian

- Born: October 3, 1979 (age 47); Birmingham, Alabama

Comedy career
- Years active: 1996 - Present
- Medium: Stand-up, television, film
- Genres: Observational comedy, surreal humor
- Subjects: American culture, pop culture
- Website: www.daviscomedy.com

Matt Davis (born October 3, 1979 in Birmingham, Alabama) is an American stand-up comedian. He is regularly featured on XM Radio's Comedy 150 and tours internationally.

== Biography ==
Matt Davis first took the stage at age 17 at the Comedy Club Stardome in Birmingham, Alabama where he later served as the club's house emcee for a year and a half before taking to the road full-time. Davis has since logged headlining dates in some of the most respected clubs in the country including The Punchline, Funny Bone(s), The Stardome, and many others. He has appeared at The Just for Laughs Festival in Montreal and Sketchfest in San Francisco.

== Discography ==
Flummux (DVD) - 2005
Illegal, OnTime, and Aroused (CD) - 2008
