= Linzie Janis =

American journalist

Linzie Janis (born June 23, 1979) is a former American television journalist. She was a correspondent at ABC News based in New York. She reported for all ABC News programs and platforms, including "Good Morning America", "World News Tonight with David Muir", "Nightline", and "20/20".

== Career ==
=== ABC News ===
Janis joined ABC News in 2013. Since then, she has covered a number of breaking stories including: the 2016 bombings in New York and New Jersey; the attack on Orlando's Pulse Nightclub; the terror attack in Nice, France; the earthquake in Ecuador; the sinking of the El Faro cargo ship; and the manhunt for two escaped convicts from a maximum security prison in New York. Janis was the first television journalist to sit down with Hulk Hogan after his legal victory over Gawker Media. In 2013, she broke news about the New York AG's lawsuit against Trump University, interviewing alleged victims of fraud and Donald Trump.

Janis has also reported on a number of social issues, from allegations of sexual assault on college campuses and controversial reproductive sciences to distracted driving. In 2012 and 2013, Janis contributed to the "Real Money" series finding creative solutions for saving American families money.

=== Bloomberg ===
Before joining ABC News, Janis anchored a daily business news broadcast on Bloomberg Television live from London. She began covering financial markets and the global economy for Bloomberg in 2008 within weeks of the collapse of Lehman Brothers. She anchored the channel's breaking news coverage of the Japanese tsunami in 2011 and the deaths of Steve Jobs and Osama bin Laden.

=== CNN ===
Janis began her career at CNN International in London, where she was a producer and reporter.

== Education ==
Janis graduated with a degree in journalism from the University of the Arts London in London, England. She also earned an MA in Clinical Psychology from Antioch University Los Angeles

== Personal life ==
Janis is a native of Schaumburg, Illinois. She is married to Good Morning America senior broadcast producer John Ferracane. They live in New York.
