= Phyl & Mikhy =

- Genre: Sitcom
- Created by: Buddy Arnold
- Directed by: Hal Cooper
- Theme music composer: Rod Parker and Hal Cooper
- Country of origin: United States
- No. of seasons: 1
- No. of episodes: 6

Production
- Producers: Rod Parker and Hal Cooper (as "Elmar Productions")

Original release
- Network: CBS
- Release: May 26, 1980

Phyl & Mikhy is an American sitcom on CBS that aired six episodes during the summer of 1980.

== Premise ==
The premise of the show was a Cold War romance, where, Phyl (Murphy Cross), a 19-year old track star, falls for Mikhy (Rick Lohman), 22 year old Russian decathlete. CBS gave it a six-week test run starting in May 1980.

Phyl is a great athlete, but not a cook, and can only make toast. To save money, the couple move in with Phyl's father Max. Mikhy is unfamiliar with American culture and technology, which actress Murphy Cross has suggested made the show a type of precursor to Perfect Strangers. Character Vladimir Gimenko keeps trying to get Mikhy to return to Russia.

== History ==
According to director Hal Cooper, the show was a very successful summer replacement, but was cut after six episodes, due to the controversy surrounding the 1980 Summer Olympics boycott. The United States withdrew from the Olympics, and Cooper thought the network did not want a show with a Russian star, so CBS executive Robert A. Daly cancelled it.

The show originally been intended to run as complementary to the upcoming Olympics, and to have debuted in January 1980. Lohman got the Russian athlete role (which CBS was finding hard to cast) because Marge Glucksman in casting at CBS had seen his audition for Trapper John, M.D., and Lohman was able to do the accent because he had many Ukrainian and Russian relatives. According to Lohman, CBS executive William S. Paley loved the show, and intended to use it as a possible replacement for The Jeffersons, but the Olympic boycott delayed the show's debut. Murphy Cross was brought to the show by Linda Otto, who had been casting director on the 1979 TV movie Torn Between Two Lovers in which Cross had appeared.

The show was recorded in front of a live audience at KTTV studios in Los Angeles. The pilot was made in March 1979, well before the political issues that led to the boycott. The remaining five episodes were shot about six months later.

== Primary cast ==
- Rick Lohman as Mikhail 'Mikhy' Orlov
- Murphy Cross as Phyllis 'Phyl' Wilson
- Larry Haines as Max Wilson
- Michael Pataki as Vladimir Gimenko
- Jack Dodson as Edgar 'Truck' Morley

== Episodes ==
No.	Title	Original release date
1	"The Meet"	May 26, 1980
An American track star runs into unusual problems after she marries a Russian defector who is also a track star.
2	"Phyl's Birthday Surprise"	June 2, 1980
Mikhy is very depressed that he doesn't have enough to buy a birthday present for Phyl and decides to abandon college and his athletic scholarship and take a job.
3	"Phyl's Wedding"	June 9, 1980
Max fears Phyl and Mikhy's wedding is going to be ruined when a strang uncle he didn't invite shows up at the ceremony.
4	"Mikhy's Visitor"	June 16, 1980
Mikhy's joy turns into homesickness when he meets his former girlfriend, a beautiful Russian track star who is visiting the United States. (Guest appearances by Mary Woronov and Marian Mercer)
5	"One Big Happy Family"	June 23, 1980
Mikhy's inexperience with the English language causes him to say some embarrassing things in a nationally televised interview.
6	"The Seduction of Mikhail Orlov"	June 30, 1980
When an unscrupulous woman photographer snaps Mikhy's picture in the shower and it appears as the centerfold of a woman's magazine, Mikhy is furious and with Vladimir's encouragement, plans to sue.
