= Working Stiffs (TV series) =

- Genre: Sitcom
- Created by: Arthur Silver; Bob Brunner; Marc Sotkin; Harry Colomby
- Developed by: David W. Duclon
- Directed by: Penny Marshall; Norman Abbott; Greg Antonacci
- Starring: James Belushi; Michael Keaton
- Composer: John Cacavas
- Country of origin: United States
- Original language: English
- No. of seasons: 1
- No. of episodes: 9 (5 unaired)

Production
- Executive producers: Bob Brunner; Arthur Silver
- Running time: 30 min. (per episode; with commercials)
- Production companies: Frog Productions; Huk, Inc. Paramount Television

Original release
- Network: CBS
- Release: September 15 – October 20, 1979

Working Stiffs is an American sitcom starring James Belushi and Michael Keaton as brothers Ernie and Mike O'Rourke, a pair of janitors who aspire to work their way up in the field of business. The brothers work in an office building owned by their Uncle Harry, and share an apartment over a cafe where they befriend the owner Mitch and waitress Nikki. Each episode features slapstick and physical comedy. Penny Marshall directed the pilot.

The series aired on CBS. It competed against the highly-rated shows NBC's CHiPs and ABC's The Ropers in its timeslot. Nine episodes were produced but after four episodes aired, the series was canceled. After Belushi and Keaton became film stars in the 1980s, six episodes of the show were released on home video. Reruns have also aired on A&E Network, Comedy Central and TV Land. The syndication package included the previously unaired episodes.

== Cast ==
- James Belushi as Ernie O'Rourke
- Michael Keaton as Mike O'Rourke
- Val Bisoglio as Al Steckler
- Allan Arbus as Mitch Hannigan
- Lorna Patterson as Nikki Evashevsky

=== Recurring ===
- Phil Rubenstein as Frank Falzone

== Episodes ==
No.	Title	Directed by	Written by	Original release date
1	"The Preview Presentation"	Penny Marshall	Marc Sotkin	September 15, 1979
2	"Looking for Mr. Goodwrench"	Norman Abbott	E. Jack Kaplan	September 22, 1979
3	"The Bank Robbery"	Norman Abbott	Alan Aidekman	September 29, 1979
4	"My Boys Are Having a Baby"	Arthur Silver	Gail Honigberg	October 6, 1979
5	"The Bosses"	Greg Antonacci	David W. Duclon	N/A
6	"Pal Joey"	Dennis Steinmetz	E. Jack Kaplan	N/A
7	"The Old Man in the Building"	TBD	TBD	N/A
8	"Trading Up"	TBD	TBD	N/A
9	"Sagebrush Estates"	TBD	TBD	N/A
