= The MacKenzies of Paradise Cove =

- Created by: William Blinn; Jerry Thorpe
- Starring: Clu Gulager; Lory Walsh; Shawn Stevens; Sean Marshall; Randi Kiger; Keith Mitchell
- Theme music composer: John Rubinstein
- Composers: Fred Werner; John Beal
- Country of origin: United States
- Original language: English
- No. of seasons: 1
- No. of episodes: 6 + 1 television film

Production
- Producers: Jerry Thorpe; William Blinn
- Running time: 60 minutes
- Production companies: Blinn/Thorpe Productions; Viacom Productions

Original release
- Network: ABC
- Release: March 27 – May 18, 1979

The MacKenzies of Paradise Cove (also known as Wonderland Cove) is an American six-episode drama miniseries which aired on ABC during the 1978–79 season from March 27 to May 18, 1979, following a television film pilot titled Stickin' Together that aired earlier in 1978.

== Plot ==
The series, set in Honolulu, follows the adventures of Bridget, Kevin, Michael, Celia and Timothy MacKenzie, five orphaned children ranging in age from 7 to 17 who, in an attempt to remain a family after their parents' death in a sailing accident, adopt Cuda Weber – a reluctant seagoing fisherman – as their unofficial guardian so that authorities will not split them up.

== Cast ==
- Clu Gulager as Cuda Weber, a free-spirited fisherman who becomes a guardian to the MacKenzie kids
- Lory Walsh as Bridget MacKenzie, the eldest daughter (17) and Kevin's twin sister
- Shawn Stevens as Kevin MacKenzie, the eldest son (17) and Bridget's twin brother
- Sean Marshall as Michael MacKenzie, the third oldest child (14)
- Randi Kiger as Celia MacKenzie, the fourth child (12)
- Keith Mitchell as Timothy MacKenzie, the youngest child at 7
- Harry Chang as Barney, Cuda's friend
- Moe Keale as "Big Ben" Kalikini, Cuda's friend
- Sean Tyler Hall as “Little Ben Kalikini, the neighbor friend

== Episodes ==
No.	Title	Directed by	Written by	Original release date	Prod. code
—	Stickin' Together	Jerry Thorpe	William Blinn	April 14, 1978	—
78-minute pilot film: After their parents are lost at sea in a sailing accident, the five MacKenzie children (Bridget, Kevin, Michael, Celia and Timothy) ranging in age from 7 to 17, attempt to foil the authorities and stay together as a family. After they persuade a commercial fisherman named Cuda Weber to represent them as their uncle and unofficial guardian, the Mackenzie kids take to the high seas for a new life of high spirited adventure in exotic and sometimes dangerous new places.
1	"Bridget's Romance"	Unknown	Steven Hensley and J. Miyoko Hensley	March 27, 1979	7801
Drastic action seems called for when Cuda is convinced that Bridget has fallen in love with a married man.
2	"Last of the Red Hot Luaus"	Harry Harris	Leah Markus	April 4, 1979	7802
Bridget learns that having a "bossy-older-sister" routine has devastating results when the younger MacKenzies, who are helping her stage a big money-making luau for a reunion of former paratroopers, decide to mutiny at the last minute. Guest stars: Howard McGillin, Robert Donner, Gregory Walcott
3	"Crate Expectations"	Jerry Thorpe	Steven Hensley and J. Miyoko Hensley	April 11, 1979	7803
The MacKenzie kids desperately try to raise enough money so they can claim a large sealed crate (although they don't know what it contains) which may represent the last known link to their missing parents. Guest Stars: William Cort, Michael McManus, Doug Mossman
4	"The Little People"	Jerry Thorpe	Robert Van Scoyk	April 27, 1979	7804
Timothy runs away to the mountains to find the Menehune, the little people of Hawaiian legend, in hopes that they can tell him where his parents are. Guest stars: Melendy Britt, Herb Edelman
5	"A Debt in the Family"	Jerry Thorpe	Unknown	May 4, 1979	7805
Cuda's romantic luck doesn't carry over when he needs money to save his home from tax foreclosure, so the MacKenzie kids enter him in a cutthroat poker game. Guest stars: Julie Cobb, Seth Sakai
6	"The Agony of Victory, the Joy of Defeat"	Harry Harris	Parke Perine	May 18, 1979	7806
The MacKenzie kids are upset when they discover Cuda making a foolish bet with his fishing-boat rival Big Jim on the outcome of a race between Michael and Big Jim's son. Guest stars: Herb Edelman, Tony Becker

== Home media release ==
In 1986, the series' 78-minute pilot film was released on videocassette under the title Wonderland Cove by Prism Entertainment.
