= Dick Clark's Live Wednesday =

1978 variety television series

Dick Clark's Live Wednesday (also known simply as Live Wednesday) is a 1978 NBC variety television series, hosted by Dick Clark, whose production company produced the series.

The only live prime-time show on any of the three major television networks in 1978, Live Wednesday was not unlike Clark's American Bandstand, with musical guests such as Diana Ross, Frankie Avalon, Bo Diddley, Connie Francis, Annette Funicello, Melissa Gilbert, Donna Summer, Bobbie Gentry and Melissa Manchester. Comedians such as Andy Kaufman, Billy Crystal, Rodney Dangerfield, David Steinberg, Jimmie Walker, David Brenner and Nipsey Russell also performed on the show. Most episodes also included a live stunt (often by Steve Baker, the self-proclaimed "Mr. Escape"), designed to emphasize the fact that the show was indeed live (at least in the eastern US), running from 8pm to 9pm.

Announcer Jerry Bishop (later Charlie O'Donnell) would the give the day's date at the top of the broadcast, again to emphasize that the show was live. This became a problem for the fourth episode, slated for October 18: NBC decided to bump the show in favour of Game 7 of the 1978 World Series. (The series ended in six games, so Clark and crew gathered to do the show anyway, but the network had already told its stations that NBC would air the movie Little Big Man if there was no baseball, and they did.) So, Live Wednesday was videotaped and aired on the following night, with the apologetic announcer saying, "Tonight, October eighteenth ... although it's actually October nineteenth, 1978!"

Live Wednesday premiered Wednesday, September 20, 1978; the initial episode would later win an Emmy award for Outstanding Achievement in Technical Direction and Electronic Camerawork. In a press release for the show, Dick Clark proclaimed "It's been a lifelong dream of mine to have a prime-time variety series." But the variety show format was beginning to be seen as outdated by the late 1970s, and ABC owned Wednesday nights, with Eight is Enough (the eleventh-most popular television show that season), easily trouncing both Live Wednesday and the CBS offerings (originally The Jeffersons and the new sitcom In the Beginning, but when the latter quickly failed, CBS shuffled several programs in and out of the timeslot).

Finally, the show was cancelled, with its last episode airing on December 27, 1978. After airing a series of specials on Wednesdays in January 1979, NBC premiered a new show starting February 7, which would be considered as one of the biggest bombs in television history: Supertrain.
