= The American Girls (TV series) =

- Left to right: Debra Clinger, David Spielberg and Priscilla Barnes
- Created by: Lee Philips; Mike Lloyd Ross; Lane Slate; Bill Driskill
- Starring: Priscilla Barnes; Debra Clinger; David Spielberg
- Theme music composer: Jerrold Immel
- Composer: Jerrold Immel
- Country of origin: United States
- Original language: English
- No. of seasons: 1
- No. of episodes: 11 (5 unaired)

Production
- Executive producers: Harve Bennett; Harris Katleman
- Producers: Hugh Benson; George Lehr; Simon Muntner; Lee Philips
- Running time: 60 minutes
- Production companies: Bennett/Katleman Productions; Columbia Pictures Television

Original release
- Network: CBS
- Release: September 23 – November 10, 1978

The American Girls is an American adventure drama series that aired on CBS on Saturday nights from September 23 to November 10, 1978.

== Synopsis ==
Rebecca Tomkins (Barnes) and Amy Waddell (Clinger) are two young reporters who work for The American Report, a news magazine similar to 60 Minutes. Rebecca and Amy travel the country in an equipped van that provides them with a production studio to work on their stories. The show's producer, Francis X. Casey (Spielberg), is busy juggling assignments, often changing the girls' schedules in mid-assignment and sometimes flying out to help them out of a tough situation.

== Cast ==
- Priscilla Barnes as Rebecca Tomkins
- Debra Clinger as Amy Waddell
- David Spielberg as Francis X. Casey
- William Prince as Jason Cook

== Episodes ==
No.	Title	Directed by	Written by	Original release date
1	"The Cancelled Czech"	Rod Holcomb	Simon Muntner	September 23, 1978
The girls fly to Reno in search of an exclusive story on a Czech magician who has recently defected and is receiving death threats.
2	"The Beautiful People Jungle"	Alvin Ganzer	Richard Landau	September 30, 1978
The girls go undercover at a health spa where rich runaways have plastic surgery to keep their true identities a secret.
3	"The Haunting of Chatham Bay"	James D. Parriott	James D. Parriott	October 7, 1978
The girls investigate a haunted house to discover the truth behind a series of alleged ghostly appearances.
4	"Firefly"	Rod Holcomb	Mike Lloyd Ross	October 14, 1978
The girls stumble onto a professional arson story when they save a young boy from a burning warehouse.
5	"A Crash Course in Survival"	John Peyser	Judy Burns	October 21, 1978
Amy rescues Rebecca and a pilot after their plane goes down in a remote area.
6	"The Phoenix Connection"	Lee Philips	Lane Slate & Mike Lloyd Ross & Bill Driskill	November 10, 1978
This was the show's pilot episode. The show, on the verge of cancellation, aired at this "special" time, Friday night at 10 p.m., pre-empting the low-rated and also soon-to-be-cancelled Flying High.
7	"The Reluctant Candidate"	Thomas Blank	Juliet Packer	Unaired
8	"The Big Body Heist"	Alvin Ganzer	Simon Muntner	Unaired
9	"The Hundred Thousand Dollar Man"	Robert Sallin	Gregory S. Dinallo	Unaired
10	"An Autobiography"	Alan Crosland Jr.	Albert Aley	Unaired
11	"Little Girl Lost"	Gene Nelson	Richard Landau	Unaired
