= Shirley (TV series) =

American comedy-drama television series

- Genre: Comedy drama
- Created by: Lance Madrid III
- Starring: Shirley Jones
- Opening theme: "Here Is Where the Love Is" performed by Shirley Jones
- Composer: Ben Lanzarone
- Country of origin: United States
- Original language: English
- No. of seasons: 1
- No. of episodes: 13

Production
- Running time: 60 minutes
- Production companies: Ten Four Productions; Universal Television

Original release
- Network: NBC
- Release: October 26, 1979 – January 25, 1980

Shirley is an American comedy-drama television series that aired on NBC from October 26, 1979, until January 25, 1980.

== Premise ==
A recent widow moves from New York City to a small town with her three children, her stepson and her housekeeper.

== Cast ==
- Shirley Jones as Shirley Miller
- Patrick Wayne as Lew Armitage
- Peter Barton as Bill Miller
- Rosanna Arquette as Debra Miller
- Bret Shryer as Hemm Miller
- Tracey Gold as Michelle Miller
- John McIntire as Dutch McHenry
- Ann Doran as Charlotte McHenry
- Cindy Eilbacher as Tracey McCord

== Episodes ==
No.	Title	Directed by	Written by	Original release date
1	"Is This What Dad Really Wanted?"	Stan Lathan	Greg Strangis and Gwen Bagni & Paul Dubov	October 26, 1979
Shirley Miller, a widow with four children, moves her family from New York to Lake Tahoe. Upon arrival they discover their new home is being fumigated.
2	"Hard Hat"	Gene Nelson	Dusty Kay	November 2, 1979
Shirley gets a job as a construction-firm paymaster, but the men resent her position. Guest stars: Michael Cavanagh and Joseph V. Perry.
3	"Son of a Gun"	Gerald Mayer	Terry Hart	November 9, 1979
Shirley is less than delighted over Bill's news that he found his father's gun.
4	"Things Your Mother Forgot to Tell You"	Mel Ferber	Greg Strangis and Gwen Bagni & Paul Dubov	November 23, 1979
Shirley becomes a substitute teacher in a sex education class.
5	"The One That Got Away"	Unknown	Pat Green & Chris Manheim	November 30, 1979
Bill's haughty mother wants him to leave Shirley and the family and live permanently in Paris. Guest star: Claudette Nevins.
6	"Play on Words"	William F. Claxton	Dave Hackel & Steve Hattman	December 7, 1979
A student athlete disrupts substitute teacher Shirley's class and she is angered when the vice-principal insists that she overlook the behavior. Guest stars: Robin Strand and Michael Parks.
7	"Twenty Years to Life"	Stan Lathan and Alan Myerson	Jaqueline Simmel-McKane & Joel Arthur Tappis	December 14, 1979
While substitute teaching, Shirley flunks an elite athlete which keeps him benched. Shirley finds out the student's older brother is the vice principal at the school which creates conflict. Guest stars: Tyne Daly and Bonnie Bartlett
8	"Separate Agendas"	William F. Claxton	Dave Hackel & Steve Hattman	December 21, 1979
Debra (Rosanna Arquette) does not trust the divorced man (Edward Winter) who is going out of his way to get into Shirley's good graces.
9	"Visions of Christmas Past"	Robert Birnbaum	Story by : Lance Madrid III and Greg Strangis & Gwen Bagni & Paul Dubov; Teleplay by : Lance Madrid III	December 28, 1979
During Christmas time, Shirley recalls the happy moments with her husband and the tragic news of his death. Guest star: Peter Haskell.
10	"On the Skids"	Alan Myerson	Chris Manheim & Pat Green	January 4, 1980
Shirley is stunned when she learns Lew (Patrick Wayne) is a 'borderline' alcoholic. Guest star: Frank Marth.
11	"Fenced In"	Unknown	Parke Perine	January 11, 1980
Shirley has to tell the Hemms that their son is a thief.
12	"The Three Dates of Shirley Miller"	Michael Preece	Mary-David Sheiner & Sheila Judis Weisberg	January 18, 1980
After two disastrous blind dates, Shirley is convinced bachelor number three is the right man, until the roof falls in.
13	"Teddy Roosevelt Slept Here"	Mel Ferber	Story by : Sandra Kay Siegel; Teleplay by : Dave Hackel & Steve Hattman	January 25, 1980
A historical society claims Teddy Roosevelt once slept in Shirley's house and subsequently invades her home. Guest stars: Jeanette Nolan, Robin Eisenman and Linda Hamilton.
