= Lifeline (1978 TV series) =

Lifeline is a documentary television program broadcast on the NBC television network between September and December 1978. It documented the daily routines of some of the most successful doctors of the time, centered on real-life cases and trauma issues, as well as the stresses of the medical staff in the attempt to interpret the end results.

It debuted in 1978 with a two-hour documentary, entitled "A Doctor's Story", which focused on the life of a trauma surgeon in and out of the emergency room.
