= Mary (1978 TV series) =

1978 American variety show

- Genre: Variety show
- Directed by: Robert Iscove
- Presented by: Mary Tyler Moore
- Starring: Mary Tyler Moore
- Country of origin: United States
- Original language: English
- No. of seasons: 1
- No. of episodes: 3

Production
- Producers: Tom Patchett; Jay Tarses
- Camera setup: Multi-camera
- Running time: 60 minutes
- Production company: MTM Enterprises

Original release
- Network: CBS
- Release: September 24 – October 8, 1978

Mary is an American comedy variety show hosted by and starring Mary Tyler Moore that aired Sundays at 8:00 pm (EST) on CBS from September 24 to October 8, 1978, with a total of three episodes aired over one season.

== Synopsis ==
Mary was the attempt by Mary Tyler Moore to return to network television after the triumph of her sitcom (The Mary Tyler Moore Show) from 1970 to 1977. Her supporting cast included a repertory company of young actors and actresses, most notably Swoosie Kurtz, Dick Shawn, Michael Keaton, Judith Kahan, David Letterman, and James Hampton, an orchestra led by Alf Clausen, and the Tony Stevens dancers.

== Reception ==
Ratings were low and CBS cancelled Mary after only three episodes. It ranked 64th out of 114 shows that season with an average 16.1/25 rating/share.

Despite the failure of Mary, Moore would make a second attempt at a TV show on CBS six months later, The Mary Tyler Moore Hour, described as a "sit-var" (part situation comedy/part variety series), about a TV star putting on a variety show. The second program lasted only 11 episodes.
