= Big Shamus, Little Shamus =

- Created by: Tracy Hotchner
- Developed by: Christopher Knopf
- Starring: Brian Dennehy; Kathryn Leigh Scott; Doug McKeon; George Wyner
- Country of origin: United States
- Original language: English
- No. of seasons: 1
- No. of episodes: 9 (7 unaired)

Production
- Executive producers: Sam Rolfe; Lee Rich
- Producer: Fred Freiberger
- Running time: 60 minutes
- Production company: Lorimar Productions

Original release
- Network: CBS
- Release: September 29 – October 6, 1979

Big Shamus, Little Shamus is an American detective drama series that aired on CBS on Saturday nights at 9:00 p.m Eastern Time for two weeks from September 29, 1979 to October 6, 1979. The show performed so poorly in the ratings, it was canceled after only two episodes were broadcast.

== Premise ==
The series focuses on Arnie Sutter, the veteran house detective at The Ansonia Hotel in Atlantic City, New Jersey, and his thirteen-year-old son Max, who solved crimes at the hotel casino relating to legalized gambling.

== Cast ==
- Brian Dennehy as Arnie Sutter
- Doug McKeon as Max Sutter
- George Wyner as George Korman
- Kathryn Leigh Scott as Stephanie Marsh
- Ty Henderson as Jerry Wilson
- Cynthia Sikes as Jingels Lodestar

== Episodes ==
No.	Title	Directed by	Written by	Original release date
1	"The Canary"	Unknown	Dick Robbins & Don Heckman	September 29, 1979
2	"The Abduction"	Unknown	Norman Katkov	October 6, 1979
3	"The Loser"	TBD	Norman Katkov	N/A
4	"The Ledge"	TBD	Fred Freiberger	N/A
5	"The Rubens"	TBD	Story by : Jackson Gillis; Teleplay by : Meyer Dolinsky	N/A
6	"The Bar Mitzvah"	TBD	David P. Harmon	N/A
7	"The Cover"	TBD	Eric Kaldor & D.K. Krzemien	N/A
8	"The Assassin"	TBD	Story by : Ray Brenner; Teleplay by : Leo Rifkin	N/A
9	"The Fanatics"	TBD	Fred Freiberger	N/A
