= Struck by Lightning (TV series) =

Television series

- Genre: Sitcom
- Created by: Arthur Fellows; Terry Keegan
- Written by: Michael Russnow
- Directed by: Joel Zwick
- Starring: Jeffrey Kramer; Jack Elam; Jeff Cotler; Bill Erwin; Millie Slavin; Richard Stahl
- Opening theme: "You Are So Beautiful" performed by Joe Cocker
- Composer: Tom Talbert
- Country of origin: United States
- Original language: English
- No. of seasons: 1
- No. of episodes: 11 (8 unaired)

Production
- Executive producers: Arthur Fellows; Terry Keegan
- Producer: Michael Friedman
- Cinematography: Keith C. Smith
- Running time: 30 minutes
- Production companies: Fellows-Keegan Productions; Paramount Television

Original release
- Network: CBS
- Release: September 19 – October 3, 1979

Struck by Lightning is an American television sitcom about Frankenstein's monster, which aired on CBS from September 19 until October 3, 1979.

This show was cancelled after three out of 11 episodes were aired in the United States, although all 11 completed episodes did end up being shown in the United Kingdom on ITV in 1980 and six out of the 11 episodes were screened on ATN-7 Sydney in Australia from 26 December 1980 to 1 March 1981.

== Premise ==
Ted Stein (Jeffrey Kramer) is a science teacher who inherits a spooky old New England inn inhabited by its hulking, good-naturedly homicidal caretaker Frank (Jack Elam). It turns out that Ted is the descendant of the original Dr. Frankenstein and Frank is the Monster who needs a special serum every 50 years to stay alive, and he wants Ted to recreate it for him ("If you don't, I'll die," he explains, "Let me put it another way, if you don't, you'll die"). Ted agrees to stay and continue his ancestor's experiments while keeping Frank's identity a secret.

== Cast ==
- Jack Elam as Frank
- Jeffrey Kramer as Ted Stein
- Millie Slavin as Nora
- Bill Erwin as Glenn Diamond
- Jeff Cotler as Brian
- Richard Stahl as Walt Calvin

== Episodes ==
| No. | Title | Directed by | Written by | Original release date |
|---|---|---|---|---|
| 1 | "Struck by Lightning" | Joel Zwick | Fred Freeman, Lawrence J. Cohen | September 19, 1979 |
| 2 | "Toot, Toot, Tutor, Goodbye" | Unknown | Phill Lewis | September 26, 1979 |
| 3 | "The Movie" | Unknown | Michael Russnow | October 3, 1979 |
| 4 | "Frank Meets the Press" | TBD | TBD | N/A |
| 5 | "Happy Birthday Frank" | TBD | TBD | N/A |
| 6 | "The Main Event" | TBD | TBD | N/A |
| 7 | "Frank the Crank" | TBD | TBD | N/A |
| 8 | "Rich Frank, Poor Frank" | TBD | TBD | N/A |
| 9 | "Looking Out for Number 2" | TBD | TBD | N/A |
| 10 | "Frank the VIIIth" | TBD | TBD | N/A |
| 11 | "My Mystery Guest" | TBD | TBD | N/A |

== Production ==
Elam claimed in an interview in Variety that he accepted the role of Frank after being told by the producers that he would not have to wear monster make-up because his naturally gnarled and bulgy-eyed appearance was already perfect for the part.

== Availability ==
As of 2010, Struck by Lightning had not been released on home video.
