= Operation Petticoat (TV series) =

American television series

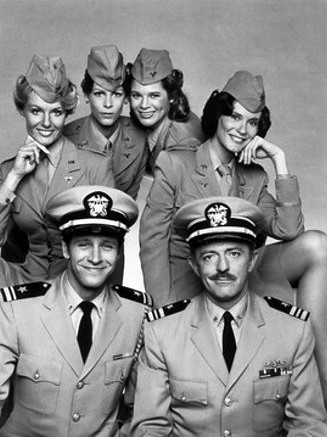
- Based on: Operation Petticoat
- Starring: John Astin; Randolph Mantooth
- Country of origin: United States
- Original language: English
- No. of seasons: 2
- No. of episodes: 32 (1 unaired)

Production
- Running time: 30 minutes
- Production companies: Heyday Productions; Universal Television

Original release
- Network: ABC
- Release: September 17, 1977 – June 29, 1979

Operation Petticoat is an American sitcom that was based on the 1959 film by the same name. It was broadcast on ABC for two seasons, from September 17, 1977, until June 29, 1979.

The first season starred John Astin as the skipper of the submarine, as well as Jamie Lee Curtis, whose father Tony Curtis had starred in the 1959 film.

== Overview ==
A submarine crew rescues a group of army nurses in the South Pacific in World War II and brings them aboard. The submarine puts into dry dock for repainting, but a surprise attack while the repainting is incomplete forces the submarine to flee with the undercoat, which happens to be a shade of pink, not painted over. The adventures of the pink submarine with a gaggle of young women on board constitute the rest of the series.

== Cast ==
- John Astin as Lt. Commander Matthew Sherman (season 1)
- Melinda Naud as Lt. Dolores Crandall
- Yvonne Wilder as Maj. Edna Howard (season 1)
- Richard Gilliland as Lt. Nick Holden (season 1)
- Dorrie Thomson as Lt. Ruth Colfax (season 1)
- Jamie Lee Curtis as Lt. Barbara Duran (season 1)
- Bond Gideon as Lt. Claire Reid (season 1)
- Jesse Dizon as Ramon Gallardo (season 1)
- Jim Varney as Seaman Broom
- Don Sparks as Seaman Horner
- Richard Brestoff as Yeoman Alvin Hunkle
- Randolph Mantooth as Lt. Mike Bender (season 2)
- Jo Ann Pflug as Lt. Katherine O'Hara (season 2)
- Fred Kareman as Doplos (season 2)
- Scott McGinnis as Seaman Dixon (season 2)
- Robert Hogan as Lt. Commander Sam Haller (season 2)
- Warren Berlinger as Chief Engineer Stanley Dobritch (season 2)
- Hilary Thompson as Lt. Betty Wheeler (season 2)

== Production ==
Initially starring John Astin as Lieutenant Commander Sherman, the role Cary Grant played in the 1959 film, the television series also cast Tony Curtis' daughter, Jamie Lee Curtis, as Lieutenant Duran. Tony Curtis had appeared in the film version. Most of the show's cast was replaced for the show's second season.

== Episodes ==
=== Television film ===
Title	Directed by	Written by	Original release date
"Operation Petticoat"	Hollingsworth Morse	John Fenton Murray, Bryan Joseph, Gil Grant, Leonard B. Stern	September 4, 1977
The pilot for the series. During World War II, the United States Navy′s most unusual crew plays host to five rescued nurses aboard the world′s only pink submarine. When released into syndication, the pilot was retitled as "Life in the Pink" to avoid confusion with the original 1959 film.

=== Season 1 (1977–78) ===
No. overall	No. in season	Title	Directed by	Written by	Original release date
1	1	"Yeoman Hunkle, Yeoman Hunkle: Part 1"	John Astin	Si Rose	September 17, 1977
2	2	"Yeoman Hunkle, Yeoman Hunkle: Part 2"	John Astin	Si Rose	September 24, 1977
3	3	"Dooley is a Daddy"	William Asher	Coslough Johnson	October 1, 1977
4	4	"Operation, Operation"	Norman Abbott	Gil Grant	October 8, 1977
5	5	"And Out of the Sea Came a Marine"	Norman Abbott	John Fenton Murray	October 15, 1977
6	6	"A Party for the Captain"	William Asher	S : John Fenton Murray; S/T : Gil Grant	October 22, 1977
7	7	"And Baby Makes 33"	Norman Abbott	S : Leonard B. Stern; T : Michael Morris	October 29, 1977
8	8	"We've No Business in Show Business"	William Asher	Si Rose & Gil Grant	November 5, 1977
9	9	"Grey is Beautiful"	Alan Bergmann	S : Rita Sedran Rose; T : Si Rose & Gil Grant	November 19, 1977
10	10	"Dear Molumphrey"	Alan Bergmann	Martin Roth	November 26, 1977
11	11	"On a Clear Day You Can See a Bulkhead"	Hollingsworth Morse	S : Si Rose; T : Joshua Brand	December 10, 1977
12	12	"I'm Dreaming of a Pink Christmas"	Hollingsworth Morse	John Fenton Murray & Gil Grant & Bryan Joseph	December 17, 1977
13	13	"Bless You, My Sub"	Alan Bergmann	John Fenton Murray & Gil Grant & Bryan Joseph	January 7, 1978
14	14	"The Instant Ensign"	Hollingsworth Morse	Leonard B. Stern & John Fenton Murray & Bryan Joseph & Gil Grant	January 14, 1978
15	15	"Down to the Sea in Slips"	Hollingsworth Morse	T : Bryan Joseph & Leonard B. Stern; S/T : Jennie Elford & Gil Grant	January 21, 1978
16	16	"The Best of Enemies"	Hollingsworth Morse	Martin Roth & Bryan Joseph & Gil Grant	January 28, 1978
17	17	"General Who?"	Alan Bergmann	S : Arne Sultan; T : Bryan Joseph & John Fenton Murray & Gil Grant	February 4, 1978
18	18	"Tostin Times Two"	Hollingsworth Morse	T : Leonard B. Stern & Gil Grant & Bryan Joseph; S/T : John Fenton Murray	February 11, 1978
19	19	"Gallardo Joins Up"	Hollingsworth Morse	Si Rose	February 18, 1978
20	20	"In Gossett We Trust"	Hollingsworth Morse	Bryan Joseph & John Fenton Murray & Gil Grant & Leonard B. Stern	February 25, 1978
21	21	"Matt on a Hot Pink Sub"	Hollingsworth Morse	John Fenton Murray & Bryan Joseph & Gil Grant & Leonard B. Stern	May 6, 1978
22	22	"Claire Voyant"	Hollingsworth Morse	John Fenton Murray & Bryan Joseph & Gil Grant & Leonard B. Stern	May 18, 1978

=== Season 2 (1978) ===
No. overall	No. in season	Title	Directed by	Written by	Original release date
23	1	"Operation Spleen"	Hollingsworth Morse	Jeff Harris & Bernie Kukoff	September 25, 1978
24	2	"The Hunkle-Crandall Affair"	Hollingsworth Morse	Jim Brecher, Paul King & Joseph Stone	October 2, 1978
25	3	"Cram Course"	Hollingsworth Morse	Jeff Harris & Bernie Kukoff	October 9, 1978
26	4	"You Owe Me One"	Hollingsworth Morse	Jeff Harris & Bernie Kukoff	October 19, 1978
27	5	"Don't Drink the Shimbakka"	Gene Nelson	Jeff Harris & Bernie Kukoff	June 1, 1979
28	6	"Talent Show"	Bruce Shurley	Jeff Harris & Bernie Kukoff	June 8, 1979
29	7	"Sub-Down"	Bernie Kukoff	John Steven Owen & Terry Hart	June 15, 1979
30	8	"Hail to the Chief"	Hollingsworth Morse	Unknown	June 22, 1979
31	9	"Big Deal on Kaloa Street"	Hollingsworth Morse	Jim Henry	June 29, 1979
32	10	"Matters of Honor"	Gene Nelson	Jeff Harris, Bernie Kukoff & Paul King	July 6, 1979
