= Whodunnit? (American game show) =

1979 American television game show

Whodunnit? is an American television game show based on the British game show of the same name. It aired on NBC from April 12 to May 17, 1979. hosted by Ed McMahon and featuring F. Lee Bailey and Melvin Belli as panelists. NBC billed the series as the first mystery game show. It attracted dismal ratings, ranking 111th out of 114 shows airing during the 1978–79 season, with an average 10.0/18 rating/share.
