= Grandpa Goes to Washington =

American comedy-drama television series

- Genre: Comedy drama
- Starring: Jack Albertson; Larry Linville; Sparky Marcus; Patti Deutsch
- Composer: Artie Butler
- Country of origin: United States
- Original language: English
- No. of seasons: 1
- No. of episodes: 11

Production
- Executive producers: Richard P. Rosetti; Leonora Thuna
- Producer: Robert Stambler
- Running time: 45 minutes
- Production company: Paramount Television

Original release
- Network: NBC
- Release: September 7, 1978 – January 16, 1979

Grandpa Goes to Washington is an American comedy-drama television series that aired on NBC on Tuesday nights from September 7, 1978, to January 16, 1979. The series was cancelled after a run of 11 episodes.

== Plot ==
The series centered on Joe Kelley, a political science teacher who was forced to retire when he turned 66, who then got himself elected to the U.S. Senate in spite of his not having any political experience. He won the election when the other candidates for office were tarnished by scandal. Kelley's style was unusual. He drove himself in an old Volkswagen (as opposed to being driven in a limousine), for relaxation he played the drums, and his earnest pledge was "Honesty in Government". He received his political information from former students, whom he considered his "friends in low places". His aim was to make the country a better place to live.

The senator lived with his son, Air Force General Kevin Kelley; Kevin's wife, Rosie; and their two children, Kathleen and Kevin, Jr. Joe thought Kevin was dull, bland and empty-headed (he called him, "My son, the Fathead'). Kevin tried to interfere with his father's position as a Senator, increasing the tension between them. Also seen was Madge, Joe's secretary, and Tony, Joe's aide. Another character was Patti who was played by comedian Patti Deutsch.

== Cast ==
- Jack Albertson as Senator Joe Kelley
- Larry Linville as Maj. General Kevin Kelley
- Sue Ane Langdon as Rosie Kelley
- Sparky Marcus as Kevin Kelley Jr.
- Michele Tobin as Kathleen Kelley
- Tom Mason as Tony DeLuca
- Madge Sinclair as Madge
- Patti Deutsch as Patti
- Scott Ellsworth as senator

== Episodes ==
No.	Title	Directed by	Written by	Original release date
1	"Pilot"	Richard Crenna	Lane Slate & Noel Baldwin	September 7, 1978
Retired college professor Joe Kelley is drafted to run for the U.S. Senate after the incumbent withdraws following the exposure of his affair with a stripper
2	"Birthday Party"	Michael Caffey	Richard Freiman	September 19, 1978
Kelley introduces a motion to investigate the spending of $27,000 for the President's birthday party at the same time his granddaughter is set to date the President's son.
3	"Kelley Inherits Tony"	Herbert Kenwith	Emily Levine & Harry Cauley	September 26, 1978
Kelley is joined by his predecessor's legislative assistant in his struggle to introduce a bill that would prevent the firing of federal employees who are living together without being married.
4	"Kelley at the Bat"	Larry Elikann	Lane Slate	October 3, 1978
Kelley matches wits with a crooked land developer to save the baseball field used by his grandson's little league team.
5	"Kelley's Best Friend"	Paul Stanley	Leonora Thuna	October 24, 1978
Kelley's oldest friend comes to Washington, supposedly to attend a convention, but instead intends to persuade the senator to do a political favor for him.
6	"The Senator's Widow"	George Tyne	Harry Spalding	October 31, 1978
A widowed interim senator shows more interest in Kelley than in politics when he asks her for her support of a bill.
7	"The Leak"	Larry Elikann	John Dunkel	December 5, 1978
Kelley lands in trouble when information in his personal files is published before it can be verified.
8	"A Star is Dead"	George Tyne	Paul West, Bruce A. Taylor, Harry Cauley, R.F. Siemanowski & Lane Slate	December 12, 1978
Kelley tries to help a silent screen star prove that a Social Security computer mistakenly declared her dead.
9	"The Red Hot Gift"	Allen Baron	John Dunkel	December 26, 1978
Kelley and his son are accused of accepting political favors after a new Rolls-Royce with the keys in it and a note saying "for your pleasure" is found in the senator's driveway.
10	"Grace"	Joseph Pevney	Barbara Avedon & Barbara Corday	January 9, 1979
While Kelley stirs up trouble on Capitol Hill with his Domestic Security Bill, his friend Grace is arrested for trying to help him.
11	"The Union Boys"	Larry Elikann	Paul West	January 16, 1979
Kelley calls for an investigation into the activities of a powerful union leader.

== Bibliography ==
- Tim Brooks and Earle Marsh, The Complete Directory to Prime Time Network and Cable TV Shows 1946–Present, Ninth edition (New York: Ballantine Books, 2007) ISBN 978-0-345-49773-4
