= Comedy Theatre (TV series) =

American television anthology series

- Genre: Anthology series
- Country of origin: United States
- Original language: English
- No. of seasons: 2
- No. of episodes: 12

Production
- Running time: 60 minutes (1976); 30 minutes (1979)

Original release
- Network: NBC
- Release: July 26, 1976 – June 28, 1979

Comedy Theatre is an American anthology television series that aired on NBC in the summers of 1976 and 1979. The episodes consisted of unsold television pilots for situation comedies.

== Background ==
The practice of television executives of ordering dozens of pilots for proposed television series each year – far more than their networks could possibly broadcast as series – created a sizable body of unsold pilots that had never aired. Packaging these unsold pilots in anthology series and airing them during the summer provided television networks with a way of both providing fresh programming during the summer rerun season and recouping at least some of the expense of producing them. Comedy Theatre was one of these series, aired by NBC in the summers of 1976 and 1979, and it consisted of unsold pilots for situation comedies. Stars appearing in the series included Danny Aiello, Herschel Bernardi, Red Buttons, Harold Gould, Arte Johnson, Rose Marie, Larry Storch, and Carol Wayne.

== Broadcast history ==
Comedy Theatre ran for six episodes over the course of seven weeks in the summer of 1976, airing on CBS from 8:00 to 9:00 p.m. Eastern Time on Monday evenings. It premiered on July 26, and its last episode aired on September 6. During its 1976 run, each of its episodes included two unsold pilots, the first airing at 8:00 p.m. and the second at 8:30 p.m.

After a hiatus of nearly three years, Comedy Theatre returned in the summer of 1979, this time in a 30-minute format which aired a single unsold pilot in each episode. Broadcast from 8:30 to 9:00 p.m. Eastern Time on Thursday evenings, it first aired on May 24, 1979 in this new format and ran for six episodes over six consecutive weeks. It left the air for good after its last episode on June 28.

According to one source, an unsold pilot called "Uptown Saturday Night" originally was scheduled for broadcast on Comedy Theatre on June 21, 1979, but was pulled from the schedule for unknown reasons. According to another source, "Uptown Saturday Night" aired as stand-alone special at 8:00 p.m.on June 28, 1979, immediately before the final episode of Comedy Theatre. Starring Cleavon Little, Adam Wade, Don Bexley, Starletta DuPois, and Julius Harris, "Uptown Saturday Night" told the story of the owner of a moving business who finds his work so stressful that he decides to marry for money.

== Episodes ==
=== Season 1 (1976) ===
No. in season	Title	Directed by	Written by	Original release date
1	"Ace"	Gary Nelson	Jerry Davis	July 26, 1976
1	"The Bureau"	Hy Averback	Charles Sailor & Eric Kaldor	July 26, 1976
In "Ace," airing at 8:00, an electronics company hires a bumbling detective to figure out who is stealing its secret plans. Starring Bob Dishy, Dick Van Patten, Liam Dunn, and Frank Campanella. "The Bureau," alternatively titled "The Agency," a spoof of secret government agencies airing at 8:30, portrayed the adventures of the chief of an agency called the Bureau and one of the Bureau's agents. Starring Henry Gibson and Barbara Rhoades.
2	"The Cheerleaders"	Richard Crenna	Monica Johnson	August 2, 1976
2	"Full House"	Bill Foster	Budd Grossman	August 2, 1976
In "The Cheerleaders," airing at 8:00, three teenage girls who are high school cheerleaders search for boyfriends while enduring a humiliating process of trying to join an exclusive club at their school in the 1950s. Starring Kathleen Cody, Debbie Zipp, and Teresa Medaris. In "Full House," airing at 8:30, three generations of a family living under one roof must deal with their tumultuous relationships — and then get the news that the grandmother has decided to end her 45-year marriage. Starring Kenneth Mars and Aneta Corsaut.
3	"Flo's Place"	Don Weis	Stanley Ralph Ross	August 9, 1976
3	"Flannery and Quilt"	Carl Reiner	Carl Reiner & Marty Feldman	August 9, 1976
In "Flo′s Place," airing at 8:00, the owner of a pierside hotel acquires a tugboat — and the financial problems that come along with it. Starring Della Reese and Eric Laneuville. In "Flannery and Quilt," airing at 8:30, two elderly widowers living in the same house are complete opposites from one another in every way, but they nonetheless take comfort in their mutual disagreement and manage to get along. Starring Harold Gould and Red Buttons.
4	"Local 306"	Alan Rafkin	Stanley Ralph Ross	August 23, 1976
4	"SNAFU"	Jackie Cooper	Arnie Rosen & Leonard B. Stern	August 23, 1976
In "Local 306," airing at 8:00, a plumber becomes chief steward of his union and must overcome his fear of flying. Starring Eugene Roche. "SNAFU," airing at 8:30, is a comedy about a United States Army unit during World War II starring Tony Roberts and James Cromwell.
5	"Making It"	Peter Baldwin	John Reiger	August 30, 1976
5	"Newman's Drugstore"	Hy Averback	Lila Garrett & Sandy Krinski	August 30, 1976
In "Making It," airing at 8:00, differences between four pre-law students force them to face the prospect of breaking up the home they share. In "Newman's Drugstore," airing at 8:30, a pharmacist who also serves as his neighborhood's social leader, philosopher, and physician faces financial problems during the Great Depression in the 1930s. Starring Herschel Bernardi.
6	"Roxy Page"	Jack Shea	Allan Manings, Ethel Brez, & Mel Brez	September 6, 1976
6	"Shaughnessey"	Hy Averback	Robert Hilliard & Pat McCormick	September 6, 1976
In "Roxy Page," airing at 8:00, an actress who wants to be on Broadway must deal with her Armenian family, who wants her to do something else with her life. Starring Janice Lynde, Leslie Ackerman, and Jeff Corey. In "Shaughnessey," airing at 8:30, chaos ensues when an auditor checks a taxicab office's books and finds some money missing. Starring Pat McCormick and David Doyle.

=== Season 2 (1979) ===
No. in season	Title	Directed by	Written by	Original release date
1	"Car Wash"	Alan Myerson	Arne Sultan & Bill Dana	May 24, 1979
Facing financial problems, the owner of a car wash asks his employees for ideas to increase the business's income — and only creates more trouble for himself. Starring Danny Aiello, Hilary Beane, and Stuart Pankin. Based on the 1976 movie Car Wash.
2	"Faculty Lounge"	Unknown	Unknown	May 31, 1979
Members of a high school faculty panic when their inept union unexpectedly forces them to go on strike. Starring Arte Johnson, George Gobel, Nanette Fabray, Rose Marie, Jackie Mason, and Larry Storch.
3	"Good Ol' Boys"	Harry Falk	Ted Bergman & William Ferguson	June 7, 1979
A songwriter tries everything he can think of to get a respectable publisher interested in his music. Starring Jerry Reed.
4	"Mother And Me, M.D."	Michael Zinberg	Charles Raymond & Jennie Blackton	June 14, 1979
A young female physician is assigned to work on the same floor of the hospital where her mother is the head nurse, and problems ensue. Starring Leah Ayres and Rue McClanahan.
5	"Me and Ducky"	Bill Persky	Steve Zacharias	June 21, 1979
When a girl tries to make friends at her new high school she gets caught between the school's most beautiful girl and its most powerful girl.
6	"Heaven on Earth"	Lou Antonio	Richard Caffey	June 28, 1979
After a computer error results in two young women ending up in heaven accidentally with no earthly existence remaining, they make a deal with an angel in which they regain a presence on earth in exchange for performing good deeds. Starring Carol Wayne, Donna Ponterotto, and William Daniels.
