= Turnabout (TV series) =

- Genre: Sitcom
- Based on: Turnabout by Thorne Smith
- Developed by: Steven Bochco; Michael Rhodes
- Written by: Steven Bochco; Jim Rogers
- Directed by: Alex March
- Starring: John Schuck; Sharon Gless
- Composers: Jack Elliott; Allyn Ferguson
- Country of origin: United States
- Original language: English
- No. of seasons: 1
- No. of episodes: 7

Production
- Executive producer: Sam Denoff
- Producers: William P. D'Angelo; Arnold Kane
- Cinematography: Mario DiLeo
- Editors: John Elias; Michael S. Murphy
- Running time: 30 min
- Production company: Sam Denoff Productions

Original release
- Network: NBC
- Release: January 26 – March 30, 1979

Turnabout is an American sitcom that first aired on NBC in 1979 and was based on a 1931 novel of the same title by Thorne Smith (which had already been developed into the 1940 movie, Turnabout). The plot was about a husband and wife who found themselves inhabiting each other's bodies. The series lasted seven episodes.

== Plot ==
Sports writer Sam Alston (John Schuck) and his cosmetics-executive wife Penny (Sharon Gless) each envy the other's life. One day, Penny buys a small statue from a gypsy and the statue turns out to have the magical power to grant wishes. The next morning, Sam and Penny each discover that they have switched bodies. Once they realize that the switch is not going to simply wear off, they both try to adjust without letting anyone know about it: Sam discovers what it is like to live as a woman and Penny as a man.

== Episodes ==
No.	Title	Directed by	Written by	Original release date
1	"Turnabout"	Richard Crenna	Steven Bochco & Michael Rhodes	January 26, 1979
A cursed Gypsy's statue causes Sam and Penny's spirits to take flight and exchange bodies after they made an idle wish, each believing that the other has the better life. Now Sam is his wife and Penny is her husband.
2	"Penny's Old Boyfriend"	Alex March	Jim Rogers	February 2, 1979
Penny's old boyfriend shows up with a job offer that Penny hopes Sam won't refuse now that he literally speaks for her. Sam suspects that the ex-boyfriend is more interested in Penny than in business, and he's in a perfect position to find out.
3	"We're a Little Late, Folks"	Arnold Laven	Richard Baer	February 9, 1979
Penny informs Sam that her former body's "monthly visitor" is late; Sam goes to the gynecologist to find out if "he's" going to become a mother.
4	"Cry Me a Touchdown"	Alex March	Ken Hecht	February 16, 1979
Sam and Penny prepare to participate in a charity touch football game, only Sam is now the cheerleader and Penny is the quarterback and neither has a clue on how to perform the other's role!
5	"Till Dad Do Us Part"	William P. D'Angelo	Barbara Avedon & Barbara Corday	March 9, 1979
Penny's family comes to visit on the occasion of her sister's wedding, and masculine-minded Sam has to be the daughter/sister instead of Penny, to Sam's annoyance and Penny's disappointment.
6	"Crass Reunion"	Bruce Bilson	Jim Rogers	March 23, 1979
Sam is invited to a fraternity reunion, and the wives are not invited. Too bad Penny is now occupying Sam's body and is the one to get the news! So they both return to Sam's old college for a wild reunion.
7	"Statutory Theft"	Tony Mordente	Sylvia Necht	March 30, 1979
The magical statue is stolen! Will Sam and Penny be cursed to stay in each other's bodies forever?

== TV movie ==
Four episodes of the series — "Turnabout," "Penny's Old Boyfriend," "Till Dad Do Us Part," and "Statutory Theft" — were compiled into a single TV-movie titled Magic Statue.
