= Sword of Justice (TV series) =

- Genre: Action-adventure
- Written by: Christopher Crowe; Michael Gleason; Glen A. Larson
- Directed by: Ray Austin; Daniel Haller
- Starring: Dack Rambo; Bert Rosario; Alex Courtney
- Composers: Glen A. Larson; Stu Phillips; John Andrew Tartaglia
- Country of origin: United States
- Original language: English
- No. of seasons: 1
- No. of episodes: 10

Production
- Executive producer: Glen A. Larson
- Producers: Joe Boston; Christopher Crowe; Herman Groves
- Camera setup: Single-camera
- Running time: 45–48 minutes
- Production companies: Glen A. Larson Productions; Universal Television

Original release
- Network: NBC
- Release: September 10, 1978 – July 11, 1979

Sword of Justice is an American action-adventure television series that aired on NBC for one season during 1978 and 1979. It was described as having elements from various shows and characters, including Robin Hood and Jack the Ripper.

== Synopsis ==
Dack Rambo starred as Jack Martin Cole, who had emerged from an unjust three-year prison sentence (1975 to 1978) to become a rich playboy by day and a troubleshooting mercenary at night, à la The Saint. Bert Rosario co-starred as Hector Ramirez, a former petty crook who was Cole's junior partner and former cell-mate, and Alex Courtney, another series regular, appeared as Arthur Woods, an attorney who had unsuccessfully defended Cole on criminal charges, who – from his involvement in that case – was motivated to head a special federal task force for the Justice Department to fight white-collar crime. His associate and partner in the task force was a federal agent known only by the family name of Buckner (Colby Chester).

Cole had previously been a full-time playboy, but his family had powerful enemies who framed him for embezzlement. Arthur Woods defended Cole at his trial, but without success. After being wrongly convicted, he served a 36-month prison sentence for the crimes he had not committed, à la The Rockford Files; Ramirez became his cell-mate during this period. During his confinement, Cole's parents died, and his family fortune was almost totally destroyed by their enemies. Bitter, hateful, and rage-filled as a direct result of his misfortunes, Cole swore revenge. To that end, once he returned to prison after attending his dead parents' funerals, he learned how to crack safes, break into banks, and most of the other secrets of the criminal trade. Upon his release, he decided to turn the tables on such above-the-law criminals as he blamed for his misfortunes by fighting them at their own game, à la It Takes a Thief, and using a unique way to leave his message: the "3" from a deck of cards, indicating how many years he spent behind bars. On these cards would be a written warning for the criminal(s).

The three of clubs would read: "The club is the sign of vengeance—it holds no man as friend." However, he would also leave clues for Woods to follow, not revealing his true identity. He would leave these with the three of diamonds. In the first installment of the series, "A Double Life," this card read: "A diamond's suit means, 'Fill your cup with wealth and worldly things.'" If there were persons Cole was assisting or protecting, he would leave the three of hearts with them. Presumably, the heart indicated compassion, concern, caring, and a wish not to see this person come to harm. The three of spades would mark the end of the game, and this card read: "The spade is the sword of justice—its rapier marks the end." In the pilot installment, later re-edited into the made-for-television film "A Double Life," the club was the sword; the spade, the vengeance sign. The second series installment, "Aloha, Julie Lang," reversed this.

The primary enemy Cole brought down in Sword of Justice: "A Double Life" was played by Larry Hagman. Rambo and Hagman would later work together on Dallas.

== Cast ==
Actor	Role
Dack Rambo	Jack Cole
Bert Rosario	Hector Ramirez
Alex Courtney	Arthur Woods

== Production ==
The series was produced by Glen A. Larson, who later incorporated the ideas of the choice of a lead best known for daytime television and of a lone crusader protecting helpless, powerless, and/or innocent people against white-collar, above-the-law criminals into Knight Rider.

== Episodes ==
No.	Title	Directed by	Written by	Original release date
1	"A Double Life"	Daniel Haller	Glen A. Larson & Michael Sloan	September 10, 1978
Note: Two-hour episode.
2	"Aloha, Julia Lang"	Ray Austin	Herman Groves	October 7, 1978
3	"The Destructors"	Curtis Harrington	Herman Groves	October 14, 1978
4	"The Skywaymen"	Ray Austin	William R. Stratton	October 19, 1978
5	"The Gemini Connection"	Michael Caffey	Herman Groves	October 21, 1978
6	"The Girl on the Edge"	Larry Stewart	Frank Lupo	October 28, 1978
7	"Judgment Day"	Christian I. Nyby II	Michael Sloan	December 17, 1978
8	"Port of Entry"	Winrich Kolbe	Christopher Crowe	December 24, 1978
9	"Deadly Fashion"	Joseph Pevney	Herman Groves	December 31, 1978
10	"Blackjack"	Daniel Haller	Glen A. Larson & Michael Sloan	July 11, 1979
Note: Two-hour episode.
