= Cliffhangers (TV series) =

American 1979 drama TV series

- Title card
- Genre: Drama
- Created by: Kenneth Johnson
- Composer: Joe Harnell
- Country of origin: United States
- Original language: English
- No. of seasons: 1
- No. of episodes: 11 (1 unaired)

Production
- Executive producer: Kenneth Johnson
- Producer: Richard Milton
- Running time: 60 min.
- Production company: Universal Television

Original release
- Network: NBC
- Release: February 27 – May 1, 1979

Cliffhangers is an American drama television series that aired on NBC from February 27 to May 1, 1979. It attempted to revive the genre of movie serials in a television format. Each hour-long episode was divided into three 20-minute segments: a mystery, Stop Susan Williams; a science fiction/Western hybrid, The Secret Empire; and a horror story, The Curse of Dracula.

== Series overview ==
- Stop Susan Williams was a take-off of the old serial The Perils of Pauline. It starred Susan Anton as globetrotting newspaper photographer Susan Williams, who is investigating the mysterious death of her brother Alan, and stumbles across a vast international conspiracy.
- The Secret Empire was a pastiche of the Gene Autry movie serial The Phantom Empire, detailing the 1880s Wild West adventures of Marshal Jim Donner (Geoffrey Scott) who stumbles upon the futuristic underground city of Chimera, which is run by aliens. Scenes on the surface were sepia-toned, while the scenes in Chimera were shown in color.
- The Curse of Dracula revolved around a young woman's quest to avenge her mother against Count Dracula (Michael Nouri), who is living undercover as a college teacher in San Francisco.

To add to the "in-progress" feeling of the proceedings, all three series started with different chapter numbers (although this was the first broadcast for all of them). "Stop Susan Williams" began at Chapter II, "The Secret Empire" started with Chapter III, and "The Curse of Dracula" with Chapter VI.

Cliffhangers was an expensive production due to three simultaneous production units being required. The hope was that if one of the serials caught on, it could be spun off into its own series; however, the show aired opposite Happy Days and Laverne & Shirley, the #1 and #2 most popular programs in television at the time. The series was cancelled after only 10 episodes had aired, by which point only The Curse of Dracula had reached its conclusion. However, one unaired episode (which did air overseas) featured the two concluding chapters of The Secret Empire as well as the final part of Stop Susan Williams. American viewers later got a chance to see the concluding part of Stop Susan Williams when its eleven installments were re-edited into a single two-hour television movie The Girl Who Saved the World. Curse of Dracula was also re-edited as two television movies, Dracula '79 and World of Dracula.

== Cast and characters ==
Stop Susan Williams

- Susan Anton as Susan Williams
- Ray Walston as Bob Richards
- Marj Dusay as Jennifer Selden (eps. 2–11)
- Michael Swan as Jack Schoengarth
- and Albert Paulsen as Anthony Korf (eps. 2–11)

The Secret Empire

- Geoffrey Scott as Marshal Jim Donner
- Carlene Watkins as Millie Thomas
- David Opatoshu as Hator (eps. 3–5, 7–11)
- Mark Lenard as Emperor Thorval
- Diane Markoff as Princess Tara

The Curse of Dracula

- Michael Nouri as Count Dracula
- Carol Baxter as Mary Gibbons
- Stephen Johnson as Kurt Von Helsing
- Bever-Leigh Banfield as Christine
- Louise Sorel as Amanda Gibbons (eps. 5–10)

== Episodes ==
No.	Title	Directed by	Written by	Original release date	US viewers (millions)
1	"Stop Susan Williams Chapter II: The Silent Enemy The Secret Empire Chapter III: Plunge into Mystery The Curse of Dracula Chapter VI: Lifeblood"	Kenneth Johnson	Kenneth Johnson	February 27, 1979	14.5
2	"Stop Susan Williams Chapter Three: Jungle Death Trap The Secret Empire Chapter 4: Prisoner of the Empire The Curse of Dracula Chapter VII: Bloodstream"	Reza S. Badiyi; Joseph Pevney; Jeffrey Hayden	Andrew Schneider; Gene Kearney; Renee & Harry Longstreet	March 6, 1979	14.2
3	"The Curse of Dracula Chapter VIII: Demons of the Dark The Secret Empire Chapter 5: The Mind Twisters Stop Susan Williams Chapter Four: Thundering Doom"	Jeffrey Hayden; Joseph Pevney; Reza S. Badiyi	Myla Lichtman; Gene Kearney; Thomas E. Szollozi & Richard Christian Matheson	March 13, 1979	14.2
4	"The Curse of Dracula Chapter IX: Depository of Death The Secret Empire Chapter 6: Seeds of Revolt Stop Susan Williams Chapter Five: Deadly Descent"	Jeffrey Hayden; Joseph Pevney; Nick Havinga	Craig Buck; Gene Kearney; Peggy Goldman	March 20, 1979	12.1
5	"The Curse of Dracula Chapter X: Sepulchre of the Undead The Secret Empire Chapter 7: Attack of the Phantom Riders Stop Susan Williams Chapter Six: Watery Grave"	Jeffrey Hayden; Joseph Pevney; Sig Neufeld	Myla Lichtman; David Bennett Carren; Andrew Schneider	March 27, 1979	11.2
6	"The Curse of Dracula Chapter XI: Threshold of Eternity The Secret Empire Chapter 8: Sizzling Threat Stop Susan Williams Chapter Seven: Cauldron of Fire"	Sutton Rolley; Tony Lo Bianco; Sig Neufeld	Craig Buck; Jeri Taylor; Richard Christian Matheson & Thomas E. Szollosi	April 3, 1979	13.0
7	"The Curse of Dracula Chapter XII: Where Angels Fear to Tread The Secret Empire Chapter 9: Mandibles of Death Stop Susan Williams Chapter Eight: River of Blood"	Sutton Rolley; Tony Lo Bianco; Sig Neufeld	Craig Buck; Jeri Taylor; Peggy Goldman	April 10, 1979	10.5
8	"The Curse of Dracula Chapter XIII: Sealed in Blood The Secret Empire Chapter 10: The Last Gasp Stop Susan Williams Chapter Nine: Wheels of Destruction"	Richard Milton; Alan Crosland; Dick Harwood	Myla Lichtman; David Carren; Peggy Goldman	April 17, 1979	10.9
9	"The Curse of Dracula Chapter XIV: Thirst for Death The Secret Empire Chapter 11: Return to Chimera Stop Susan Williams Chapter Ten: Terror from the Sky"	Richard Milton; Alan Crosland; Sig Neufeld	Myla Lichtman; Jeri Taylor; Peggy Goldman	April 24, 1979	10.9
10	"The Curse of Dracula Chapter XV: Pleas of the Damned The Secret Empire Chapter 12: Powerhouse Stop Susan Williams Chapter Eleven: The Villain Revealed"	Richard Milton; Alan Crosland; Reza S. Badiyi	Myla Lichtman; Nona Tyson; Richard Christian Matheson & Thomas E. Szollosi	May 1, 1979	11.2
11	"The Secret Empire Chapter 13: Partisans Unchained Stop Susan Williams Chapter Twelve: Crypt of Disaster The Secret Empire Chapter 14: Escape to the Stars"	unknown	unknown	unaired	N/A

== See also ==
- Vampire films
- List of vampire films
- List of vampire television series
