= Hizzonner =

1979 American TV sitcom series

- Starring: David Huddleston; Diana Muldaur
- Country of origin: United States
- Original language: English
- No. of seasons: 1
- No. of episodes: 7

Production
- Running time: 30 minutes

Original release
- Network: NBC
- Release: May 10 – June 14, 1979

Hizzonner is an American television sitcom that aired on NBC on Thursday nights from May 10 to June 14, 1979. David Huddleston not only starred, he was also executive producer, wrote the theme song, and did the majority of the casting.

== Synopsis ==
The series centered on Mayor Cooper, a widower with two grown children, Annie, a civil rights attorney, and James, a hippie.

An aspect of the series is that when things would get out of hand, Mayor Cooper would break into song and there was always a musical number in each episode.

== Cast ==
- David Huddleston as Mayor Cooper
- Will Seltzer as James Cooper
- Kathy Cronkite as Annie Cooper
- Don Galloway as Donald Timmons
- Diana Muldaur as Ginny
- Gina Hecht as Melanie
- Mickey Deems as Nails

== Episode list ==
No.	Title	Original release date
1	"Daughter on 10th Avenue"	May 10, 1979
2	"Mizzonner"	May 17, 1979
3	"Nails Gets Kidnapped"	May 24, 1979
4	"Tea and Synthesizers"	May 31, 1979
5	"The Book Story"	June 7, 1979
6	"Mr. Perfect"	June 14, 1979
7	"The Election Story"	June 21, 1979
