= David Cassidy: Man Undercover =

- Genre: Police drama
- Created by: Richard Fielder
- Written by: Sean Baine; Stephen Downing; Richard Fielder; Rick Kelbaugh; Chester Krumholz; Mark Rodgers
- Directed by: Edward M. Abroms; Virgil Vogel
- Starring: David Cassidy; Simon Oakland; Wendy Rastatter
- Composer: Harry Betts
- Country of origin: United States
- Original language: English
- No. of seasons: 1
- No. of episodes: 10

Production
- Executive producer: David Gerber
- Producers: Mark Rodgers; Mel Swope
- Cinematography: Al Francis; John V. LaBarbera; Jack Whitman
- Running time: 45–48 min
- Production companies: Columbia Pictures Television; David Gerber Productions

Original release
- Network: NBC
- Release: November 2, 1978 – July 12, 1979

Related
- Police Story; Police Woman; Joe Forrester

David Cassidy: Man Undercover (the word "undercover" in the series title appeared at various times written as one word or two) is an American police drama starring David Cassidy, four years after his run starring in The Partridge Family, his first starring role since that series was cancelled. The series was spun off after Cassidy starred in a special two-hour episode of Police Story, titled "A Chance to Live", which aired in May 1978; this episode served as the pilot for Man Undercover.

In A Chance to Live, Cassidy portrayed undercover police officer Dan Shay, a cop who successfully infiltrates a high-school drug ring as a fellow student. Cassidy earned an Emmy Award nomination for Best Dramatic Actor for the role. He reprised the role of Officer Shay for the Man Undercover series, which aired on NBC from November 2, 1978 to July 12, 1979. Only ten episodes of the show aired prior to its cancellation.

The role of Shay's wife, portrayed in "A Chance to Live" by Dee Wallace, was recast with Wendy Rastatter for the actual series.

This show is the last new filmed series from Columbia Pictures Television to display a copyright notice at the beginning under the show's logo in the opening credits.

== Synopsis ==
Set in Los Angeles, the series stars Cassidy as undercover police officer Dan Shay. Each episode featured Shay going undercover in a different case. Simon Oakland starred as the head of Shay's undercover team.

The plot of a twenty-something cop going undercover in high school would be used more popularly the following decade in 21 Jump Street.

== Episodes ==
No.	Title	Directed by	Written by	Original release date
1	"Running the Hill"	Bernard McEveety	Sean Baine	November 2, 1978
2	"Baby Makes Three"	Vince Edwards	Dallas L. Barnes	November 9, 1978
3	"Cage of Steel"	Sam Wanamaker	Walter Dallenbach	November 16, 1978
4	"Deadly Convoy"	Alvin Ganzer	E. Arthur Kean	November 23, 1978
5	"Flashpoint"	Alexander Singer	Mark Rodgers	December 7, 1978
6	"RX for Dying"	Don Medford	Sean Baine	December 21, 1978
7	"Firestorm"	Edward M. Abroms	Mark Rodgers	December 28, 1978
8	"Teammates"	Alf Kjellin	Richard Kelbaugh	January 4, 1979
9	"Nightwork"	Edward M. Abroms	Story by : Kendelle J. Blaire; Teleplay by : Chester Krumholz	July 5, 1979
10	"Death is a Close Friend, Too"	Virgil W. Vogel	Story by : Sy Salkowitz; Teleplay by : Chester Krumholz	July 12, 1979
