= Harris and Company =

- Genre: Drama
- Created by: Arthur A. Ross
- Directed by: Tom Blank; Ivan Dixon
- Starring: Bernie Casey; David Hubbard; Renee Brown; Lia Jackson; Dain Turner; Eddie Singleton; Stu Gilliam; Carol Tillery Banks; Lois Walden; James Luisi
- Country of origin: United States
- Original language: English
- No. of seasons: 1
- No. of episodes: 4

Production
- Executive producer: Stan Robertson
- Producer: Arnold F. Turner
- Running time: 44 mins.
- Production company: Universal Television

Original release
- Network: NBC
- Release: March 15 – April 5, 1979

Harris and Company is an American television drama series that aired on NBC from March 15 to April 5, 1979, on Thursday night.

== Synopsis ==
The series stars Bernie Casey as Mike Harris, a working-class African-American father of five who relocates his family from Detroit, Michigan, to Los Angeles, California, after the death of his wife. The series is based upon Love Is Not Enough, a TV movie that aired on NBC on June 12, 1978. It was the first weekly American TV drama series centered on an African-American family.

The series aired for only four episodes and was the lowest-rated U.S. broadcast network primetime series that season, ranking 114th with a 7.6/12 rating/share.

== Cast ==
- Bernie Casey as Mike Harris
- David Hubbard as David Harris
- Renee Brown as Liz Harris
- Lia Jackson as Juanita "J.P." Harris
- Dain Turner as Richard Harris
- Eddie Singleton as Tommy Harris
- Stu Gilliam as Charlie Adams
- Carol Tillery Banks as Angie Adams
- Lois Walden as Louise Foreman
- James Luisi as Harry Foreman
- Isabel Cooley as Jenny
