= Laverne & Shirley season 7 =

Laverne & Shirley
- Season 7
- DVD cover
- Starring: Penny Marshall; Cindy Williams; Michael McKean; David Lander; Phil Foster; Eddie Mekka; Leslie Easterbrook
- No. of episodes: 22

Release
- Original network: ABC
- Original release: October 13, 1981 – May 11, 1982

Season chronology
- ← Previous; Season 6 Next → Season 8

The seventh season of Laverne & Shirley, an American television sitcom series, began airing on October 13, 1981 on ABC. The season concluded on May 11, 1982 after 22 episodes.

The season aired Tuesdays at 8:30-9:00 pm (EST). It ranked 20th among television programs and garnered a 19.9 rating. The entire season was released on DVD in North America on February 4, 2014.

== Overview ==
The season revolves around the titular characters Laverne DeFazio and Shirley Feeney and their friends in Burbank, California in 1966, however no longer with Betty Garrett as Edna Babish.

== Cast ==
=== Starring ===
- Penny Marshall as Laverne DeFazio
- Cindy Williams as Shirley Feeney
- Michael McKean as Leonard "Lenny" Kosnowski
- David Lander as Andrew "Squiggy" Squiggman
- Phil Foster as Frank DeFazio
- Eddie Mekka as Carmine Ragusa
- Leslie Easterbrook as Rhonda Lee

=== Guest Starring ===
- Joey Heatherton as herself

== Episodes ==
No. overall	No. in season	Title	Directed by	Written by	Original release date	Prod. code
135	1	"The Most Important Day Ever"	Tom Trbovich	Gene Braunstein & Robert Perlow	October 13, 1981	136
The roommates make their TV debut with acrobats from another country.
136	2	"It Only Hurts When I Breathe"	Tom Trbovich	Al Aidekman	October 27, 1981	137
Feeling anxious about going to their 10-year reunion, Shirley accidentally punches Laverne in the jaw and messes everything up.
137	3	"I Wonder What Became of Sal?"	Tom Trbovich	Mark Rothman	November 3, 1981	147
Laverne's old beau is now a millionaire and wants to reconnect.
138	4	"Young at Heart" "Teenage Lust"	Tom Trbovich	Dana Olsen	November 10, 1981	141
The roommates attend a wild fraternity party.
139	5	"The Defiant One"	Tom Trbovich	Judy Pioli	November 17, 1981	138
Shirley is handcuffed to an escaping robber.
140	6	"Night at the Awards"	Tom Trbovich	Roger Garrett	November 24, 1981	135
Lenny and Squiggy crash an awards ceremony. They impose on Joey Heatherton to read one of their TV scripts.
141	7	"Some Enchanted Earring"	Tom Trbovich	David Lerner & Bruce Ferber	December 1, 1981	139
Laverne loses a precious earring on a date.
142	8	"Moving In"	Tom Trbovich	Terry Hart	December 8, 1981	142
Laverne plans to move in with her boyfriend.
143	9	"Friendly Persuasion"	Tom Trbovich	Wally Dalton	December 15, 1981	140
Laverne and Shirley misinterpret an actor's kindness and Laverne thinks he is in love with her, while Shirley thinks he wants her job.
144	10	"I Do, I Don't"	Tom Trbovich	Cindy Begel & Lesa Kite	January 5, 1982	144
Shirley tries to get Carmine to marry her.
145	11	"Love Is the Tar Pits"	Tom Trbovich	Roger Garrett	January 12, 1982	143
Squiggy is jealous of Lenny's new girlfriend.
146	12	"Watch the Fur Fly"	Jack Winter	Bob Howard	January 19, 1982	149
The roommates lie to try and impress their dates.
147	13	"Rocky Ragu"	Tom Trbovich	Albert Goodman	January 26, 1982	146
Carmine auditions to play a boxer in a movie and must hone his old boxing skills.
148	14	"Star Peepers"	Jack Winter	Larry Levinson & Barry O'Brien	February 2, 1982	150
The girls want to expose a scandal to get back at a singer's rudeness, but they rethink their plan when a tabloid editor goes overboard.
149	15	"An Affair to Forget"	Jack Winter	Steve Granat & Mel Sherer	February 9, 1982	148
Laverne falls for a new guy who hides the fact he's married, but when his wife shows up to their date, he goes to extremes to hide Laverne from his wife. Guest Star: Anjelica Huston
150	16	"Whatever Happened to the Class of '56?"	Phil Perez	Paula A. Roth	February 16, 1982	145
Thanks to Lenny and Squiqqy, everyone at Fillmore's reunion thinks Laverne and Shirley are movie stars and Carmine is a Vegas sensation.
151	17	"Ski Show"	Tom Trbovich	Judy Pioli & Marc Sotkin	February 23, 1982	153
The girls hope to meet men on a ski weekend.
152	18	"Helmut Weekend"	Tom Trbovich	Roger Garrett	March 2, 1982	151
Squiggy's long-lost father returns.
153	19	"That's Entertainment"	Gary Menteer	Etan McElroy & Larry Strawther	March 9, 1982	156
Frank and Carmine have dreams reflecting their argument about old and new entertainment.
154	20	"Lightning Man"	Tom Trbovich	Jack Lukes & Shelly Goldstein	March 16, 1982	154
Carmine finds fame after lightning strikes him.
155	21	"Crime Isn't Pretty"	Tom Trbovich	Al Aidekman & Nick LeRose	May 4, 1982	155
Frank and Carmine set a trap for burglars in Laverne and Shirley's apartment.
156	22	"Perfidy in Blue"	Tom Trbovich	Laurie Gelman	May 11, 1982	152
Shirley has a nightmare after lying to Laverne about losing her favorite purse.
