= Laverne & Shirley season 2 =

Laverne & Shirley
- Season 2
- DVD cover
- Starring: Penny Marshall; Cindy Williams; Michael McKean; David Lander; Phil Foster; Eddie Mekka; Betty Garrett
- No. of episodes: 23

Release
- Original network: ABC
- Original release: September 28, 1976 – April 5, 1977

Season chronology
- ← Previous; Season 1 Next → Season 3

The second season of Laverne & Shirley, an American television sitcom series, began airing on September 28, 1976 on ABC. The season concluded on April 5, 1977 after 23 episodes.

The season aired Tuesdays at 8:30-9:00 pm (EST). It ranked 2nd among television programs and garnered a 30.9 rating. The entire season was released on DVD in North America on April 17, 2007.

== Overview ==
The series revolves around the titular characters Laverne DeFazio and Shirley Feeney, bottle-cappers at Shotz Brewery in 1950s Milwaukee, Wisconsin. Episode plots include their adventures with neighbors and friends, Lenny and Squiggy.

== Cast ==
=== Starring ===
- Penny Marshall as Laverne DeFazio
- Cindy Williams as Shirley Feeney
- Michael McKean as Leonard "Lenny" Kosnowski
- David Lander as Andrew "Squiggy" Squiggman
- Phil Foster as Frank DeFazio
- Eddie Mekka as Carmine Ragusa
- Betty Garrett as Edna Babish

=== Guest-starring ===
- Ron Howard as Richie Cunningham
- Anson Williams as Potsie Weber
- Scott Brady as Jack Feeney, Shirley's father
- Maureen Arthur as Veronica
- Severn Darden as Charles Pfister Krane

== Episodes ==
No. overall	No. in season	Title	Directed by	Written by	Original release date
16	1	"Drive! She Said"	Howard Storm	Jack Winter	September 28, 1976
The girls acquire their first car but, in truth, Laverne is afraid to drive. Shirley tries to teach her but instead ends up calling her a lost cause.
17	2	"Angels of Mercy"	Howard Storm	Michael Warren & William Bickley	October 5, 1976
Shirley talks Laverne into joining her at the hospital as a volunteer worker when the man Laverne likes needs an operation.
18	3	"Bachelor Mothers"	Howard Storm	Barry Rubinowitz	October 19, 1976
The girls must choose between babysitting as promised and accepting last minute dates.
19	4	"Excuse Me, May I Cut In?"	John Thomas Lenox	Fred Fox, Jr.	October 26, 1976
The girls talk Richie Cunningham and Potsie Weber into taking them to a dance contest, where the winning prize is a new tv. Notes: First appearance of Betty Garrett as Edna Babish.
20	5	"Bridal Shower"	Alan Myerson	Paula A. Roth & Judy Skelton	November 9, 1976
The girls attend a bridal shower where they're made to feel inadequate for being the only ones still single.
21	6	"Look Before You Leap"	James Burrows	Deborah Leschin & David W. Duclon	November 16, 1976
Laverne assumes the worst when she wakes up with morning sickness after a wild night she can't remember.
22	7	"Dear Future Model"	James Burrows	Story by : Barbara Robles; Teleplay by : Barbara Robles & Judy Skelton	November 23, 1976
The girls set out to become models.
23	8	"Good Time Girls"	James Burrows	Laura Levine	November 30, 1976
Laverne and Shirley have their phone number written in a men's restroom after they repeatedly turn down an old school chum, Hector. Guest Stars: Greg Antonacci as Hector, Stephen Nathan as Kevin, Bruce Kimmel as Scott, Fred Willard as Man in Bathroom, and John Mengatti as Pool Hall Patron.
24	9	"Two of Our Weirdos Are Missing"	Howard Storm	Bob Sand & Bo Kaprall	December 7, 1976
Lenny and Squiggy run away to join a circus after finding themselves in debt.
25	10	"Christmas at the Booby Hatch" "Oh, Hear the Angel Voices"	Howard Storm	David W. Duclon	December 21, 1976
Carmine talks the gang into singing at a Christmas show in a psychiatric hospital.
26	11	"Guilty Until Proven Not Innocent"	James Burrows	Bob Sand & Bo Kaprall	January 4, 1977
Laverne gets arrested for stealing when a snooty salesman at a high class boutique catches her with a scarf she accidentally put in her purse.
27	12	"Anniversary Show" "The Laverne & Shirley Birthday Show"	John Thomas Lenox	Paula A. Roth & Roger Garrett	January 10, 1977
The gang remembers past events as they wait for the girls to return from a trip to Canada and have a surprise party at the Pizza Bowl.
28	13	"Playing Hooky"	John Thomas Lenox	Barry Rubinowitz	January 11, 1977
The girls skip work, only for a couple of cops to mistake them for hookers.
29	14	"Guinea Pigs"	James Burrows	Jack Winter	January 18, 1977
The girls become guinea pigs for experiments to earn extra money to attend a cocktail party.
30	15	"Call Me a Taxi"	Alan Myerson	Deborah Leschin & Paula A. Roth	February 1, 1977
The girls become taxi dancers when they get laid off.
31	16	"Steppin' Out"	Dennis Klein	Deborah Leschin	February 8, 1977
The girls dress up to step out with two new fellas, but then unforeseen problems arise.
32	17	"Buddy, Can You Spare a Father?"	Ray DeVally, Jr.	Monica Johnson & Eric Cohen	February 15, 1977
Shirley goes to a sleazy bar on the waterfront to find her missing down-and-out father.
33	18	"Honeymoon Hotel"	Gary Shimokawa	Monica Johnson & Eric Cohen	February 22, 1977
Shirley wins a vacation in a contest that's only for newlyweds, but she and Laverne decide to make it a fun weekend.
34	19	"Hi, Neighbors: Book 2"	Ray DeVally, Jr.	Michael McKean & Davy L. Lander	March 1, 1977
The girls take pity on Lenny and Squiggy, who've been stood up and agree to go to dinner with them.
35	20	"Frank's Fling"	Howard Morris	William J. Keenan	March 8, 1977
The girls conspire to get rid of Frank's new snooty girlfriend.
36	21	"Haunted House"	Alan Myerson	Andrew Johnson	March 22, 1977
The girls go to a reportedly haunted mansion while looking for a new couch.
37	22	"Lonely at the Middle"	James Burrows	Jack Winter	March 29, 1977
Shirley gets promoted to supervisor of the bottle-labels division, only to have her subordinates turn against her.
38	23	"Citizen Krane"	Ray DeVally, Jr.	Raymond Siller	April 5, 1977
An impresario headlines the girls in a musical extravaganza with the promise of stardom.
