= Laverne & Shirley season 5 =

Laverne & Shirley
- Season 5
- DVD cover
- Starring: Penny Marshall; Cindy Williams; Michael McKean; David Lander; Phil Foster; Eddie Mekka; Betty Garrett
- No. of episodes: 26

Release
- Original network: ABC
- Original release: September 13, 1979 – May 13, 1980

Season chronology
- ← Previous; Season 4 Next → Season 6

The fifth season of Laverne & Shirley, an American television sitcom series, began airing on September 13, 1979, on ABC. The season concluded on May 13, 1980, after 26 episodes.

The season aired Thursdays at 8:00-8:30 pm (EST), Mondays at 8:00-8:30 pm (EST) and Tuesdays at 8:30-9:00 pm (EST). The entire season was released on DVD in North America on April 10, 2012.

== Overview ==
The series revolves around the titular characters Laverne DeFazio and Shirley Feeney, bottle-cappers at Shotz Brewery in early 1960s Milwaukee, Wisconsin. Episode plots include their adventures with neighbors and friends, Lenny and Squiggy.

== Cast ==
=== Starring ===
- Penny Marshall as Laverne DeFazio
- Cindy Williams as Shirley Feeney
- Michael McKean as Leonard "Lenny" Kosnowski
- David Lander as Andrew "Squiggy" Squiggman
- Phil Foster as Frank DeFazio
- Eddie Mekka as Carmine Ragusa
- Betty Garrett as Edna Babish

=== Guest Starring ===
- Ron Howard as Richie Cunningham
- Henry Winkler as Arthur "Fonzie" Fonzarelli
- Susan Kellermann as Bambi
- Ed Begley Jr. as Robert "Bobby" Feeney, Shirley's brother
- Michelle Greene as Vicki
- Elizabeth Daily as Rita
- Art Garfunkel as "The Mighty Oak"
- Ted Danson as Randy Carpenter
- Roger C. Carmel as The Waiter
- Scatman Crothers as Porter
- Wilfrid Hyde-White as Colonel Kalaback
- Conrad Janis as The Conductor
- Vicki Lawrence as Sergeant Alvinia T. Plout
- Ed Marinaro as Antonio DeFazio, Laverne's cousin

== Episodes ==
No. overall	No. in season	Title	Directed by	Written by	Original release date
87	1	"Shotgun Wedding: Part 2"	Joel Zwick	Judy Pioli	September 13, 1979
In the second part of a two-part crossover with Happy Days, the girls become engaged to Richie and Fonzie to rescue them from a shotgun wedding.
88	2	"One Heckuva Note"	Joel Zwick	Jeff Franklin	September 20, 1979
While cleaning, Shirley discovers a love letter written by Carmine and addressed to Laverne.
89	3	"Fat City Holiday"	Joel Zwick	Roger Garrett	September 27, 1979
When the girls want something fun to do for a holiday weekend, they get jobs at a fat farm where they're trained by a woman with a most unique technique for losing weight.
90	4	"Upstairs, Downstairs"	Joel Zwick	Al Aidekman	October 4, 1979
The girls dream of their eternal reward/punishment because of their argument over a wrongly issued check from the phone company.
91	5	"What Do You Do with a Drunken Sailor?"	Joel Zwick	Chris Thompson & Gary H. Miller	October 18, 1979
Shirley is visited by her brother, who has trouble dealing with his alcoholism.
92	6	"You've Pushed Me Too Far"	Joel Zwick	Jeff Franklin	October 25, 1979
Squiggy accidentally pushes Lenny out a window and Lenny ends their friendship over it.
93	7	"The Wedding"	Joel Zwick	Paula A. Roth	November 1, 1979
Edna accepts Frank's marriage proposal but she sees their later mishaps getting to the church as a bad omen.
94	8	"Bad Girls"	Joel Zwick	Barry Rubinowitz	November 8, 1979
Edna's niece becomes involved with the girls' old club which has gone from revelry to robbery.
95	9	"We're in the Army, Now"	Joel Zwick	Judy Pioli & Jeff Franklin	November 15, 1979
96	10	"We're in the Army, Now"	Joel Zwick	Judy Pioli & Jeff Franklin	November 15, 1979
The girls enlist in the Army when they are denied promotions at Shotz.
97	11	"Take Two, They're Small"	Ray DeVally, Jr.	Paula A. Roth & Judy Pioli	November 22, 1979
Lenny and Squiggy start a dating service that pairs Laverne and Shirley with a pair of midgets.
98	12	"The Fourth Annual Shotz Talent Show"	Joel Zwick	Chris Thompson	December 6, 1979
Mr. Shotz insists on a patriotic theme for the talent show.
99	13	"Testing, Testing"	Joel Zwick	Story by : Kenny Rich; Teleplay by : Chris Thompson	December 13, 1979
Shotz hires a psychologist to analyze work aptitudes.
100	14	"Not Quite South of the Border"	Joel Zwick	Deborah Leschin & Susan Seeger	January 7, 1980
The girls take a vacation at Raoul's By the Bay in "near Mexico".
101	15	"You Oughta Be in Pictures"	Joel Zwick	Jeff Franklin	January 14, 1980
The girls are recruited to appear in a film for the Army, the topic of which is prostitution.
102	16	"The Beatnik Show"	Joel Zwick	Barry Rubinowitz & Al Aidekman	January 21, 1980
The girls impress beatniks at a coffeehouse with their exotic dance.
103	17	"The Right to Light"	Joel Zwick	Kenny Rich	January 28, 1980
The girls chain themselves inside the gas company to protest a gas bill - before realizing there's a bomb about to go off.
104	18	"Why Did the Fireman...?"	Joel Zwick	Roger Garrett	February 4, 1980
Laverne dates a fireman (played by Ted Danson), but before he's about to propose to her, he's killed in the line of duty.
105	19	"The Collector"	Joel Zwick	Story by : Linda Segall & John Byers; Teleplay by : Jeff Young & Frank Alesia	February 11, 1980
Carmine is tired of never having enough money, so he gets a job working for a loan shark.
106	20	"Murder on the Moosejaw Express: Part 1"	Joel Zwick	Richard Rosenstock & Jack Lukes	February 26, 1980
The girls are on a train when a murder victim stumbles into their compartment, his last words being: "Beware the bald man."
107	21	"Murder on the Moosejaw Express: Part 2"	Joel Zwick	Charlotte M. Dobbs & Jeff Franklin	March 4, 1980
Poisoning and kidnapping lead to a final confrontation with the bald man who targets Laverne & Shirley on the Moosejaw Express.
108	22	"Survival Test"	Joel Zwick	Story by : Richard Gurman; Teleplay by : Roger Garrett & Al Aidekman	March 11, 1980
Sergeant Plout orders the girls to partake in a survival test pitting men against women in the "frozen wilderness".
109	23	"Antonio, the Amazing"	Maurice Bar-David	Cindy Begel & Lesa Kite	March 18, 1980
Laverne's Italian cousin Antonio comes to America to make his fortune, but he can't seem to find a job.
110	24	"The Duke of Squiggman"	Penny Marshall	Jeff Franklin	March 25, 1980
Squiggy becomes an English duke when he sleepwalks.
111	25	"The Diner"	Linda McMurray	Bob Perlow	May 6, 1980
Lenny's uncle leaves him a diner called "Dead Lazlo's" and the girls talk the boys into letting them take it over.
112	26	"Separate Tables"	Frank Alesia	Deborah Raznick & Ria Nepus	May 13, 1980
To help Laverne conquer her fear of being alone, Shirley makes her eat on her own at a Chinese restaurant.
