= Laverne & Shirley season 6 =

Laverne & Shirley
- Season 6
- DVD cover
- Starring: Penny Marshall; Cindy Williams; Michael McKean; David Lander; Phil Foster; Eddie Mekka; Betty Garrett; Leslie Easterbrook; Ed Marinaro
- No. of episodes: 22

Release
- Original network: ABC
- Original release: November 18, 1980 – May 26, 1981

Season chronology
- ← Previous; Season 5 Next → Season 7

The sixth season of Laverne & Shirley, an American television sitcom series, began airing on November 18, 1980, on ABC. The season concluded on May 26, 1981, after 22 episodes.

The season aired Tuesdays at 8:30-9:00 pm (EST). It ranked 20th among television programs and garnered a 20.6 rating. The entire season was released on DVD in North America on May 21, 2013.

== Overview ==
Laverne and Shirley and their friends all move from Milwaukee to Burbank, California. The ladies take jobs as gift wrappers at a department store; Frank and Edna manage a Texas BBQ restaurant called Cowboy Bill's, Carmine delivers singing telegrams and seeks work as an actor, and Lenny and Squiggy start a talent agency called Squignowski Talent Agency. From this point until the end of the series' run, Laverne & Shirley was set in the mid-1960s, starting in 1965.

== Cast ==
=== Starring ===
- Penny Marshall as Laverne DeFazio
- Cindy Williams as Shirley Feeney
- Michael McKean as Leonard "Lenny" Kosnowski
- David Lander as Andrew "Squiggy" Squiggman
- Phil Foster as Frank DeFazio
- Eddie Mekka as Carmine Ragusa
- Betty Garrett as Edna Babish
- Leslie Easterbrook as Rhonda Lee
- Ed Marinaro as Sonny St. Jacques

=== Guest Starring ===
- Troy Donahue as Himself
- Jim Lange as Himself
- Vicki Lawrence as Sergeant Alvinia T. Plout

== Episodes ==
No. overall	No. in season	Title	Directed by	Written by	Original release date
113	1	"Not Quite New York"	John Tracy	Jeff Franklin	November 18, 1980
When the girls lose their jobs to automation, for a new start they move to California to be near Frank and Edna.
114	2	"Welcome to Burbank"	John Tracy	Jeff Franklin	November 25, 1980
As soon as the girls settle into their new apartment in Burbank, an earthquake hits.
115	3	"Studio City"	John Tracy	Richard Rosenstock	December 2, 1980
The girls audition to be stuntwomen in a movie set in prehistoric times starring Troy Donahue.
116	4	"Grand Opening"	John Tracy	Ruth Bennett	December 9, 1980
At the grand opening of Frank's eatery, the knife-thrower doesn't show, so Shirley assumes the position of tossing knives at Laverne.
117	5	"Candy Is Dandy"	John Tracy	Joanne Pagliaro	December 16, 1980
The girls get jobs wrapping rum-filled chocolates.
118	6	"The Dating Game"	Penny Marshall	Al Aidekman	December 30, 1980
Lenny and Squiggy are chosen as contestants on The Dating Game simply because Jim Lange pities them.
119	7	"The Other Woman"	Arthur Silver	Joanne Pagliaro	January 6, 1981
Shirley notices something familiar about her boyfriend's estranged wife.
120	8	"The Road to Burbank"	Frank Alesia	Jeff Franklin	January 13, 1981
The girls are fined for room damage at a hotel where they checked in with Lenny and Squiggy as married couples. Each side tells their own version of what happened so the gang can decide who should pay.
121	9	"Born Too Late"	Alan Myerson	Roger Garrett	January 27, 1981
Lenny and Squiggy imagine living a silent life after watching a silent movie.
122	10	"Love Out the Window"	Linda McMurray	Ruth Bennett	February 3, 1981
Sonny reluctantly quits his job as a stuntman and goes into insurance to ease Laverne's fears of him dying while performing a stunt.
123	11	"Malibu Mansion"	Frank Alesia	Anthony DiMarco & David Ketchum	February 10, 1981
The girls get a house-sitting job through Frank at a mansion in Malibu, where they throw an outrageous party.
124	12	"To Tell the Truth"	Jack Winter	Al Aidekman	February 17, 1981
The gang spends a night playing a "truth game" that ends up in hurt feelings.
125	13	"I Do, I Do"	Phil Perez	Cindy Begel & Lesa Kite	February 24, 1981
A pair of British rock stars proposes to the girls in order to gain American citizenship.
126	14	"But Seriously, Folks..."	Penny Marshall	Jeff Franklin	March 3, 1981
Carmine starts a new career as a comedian and uses his friends as the basis for his jokes.
127	15	"The Bardwell Caper: Part 1"	Tom Trbovich	Anthony DiMarco & David Ketchum	March 10, 1981
The girls send a nasty note to their boss before realizing he's given them a raise.
128	16	"The Bardwell Caper: Part 2"	Tom Trbovich	Anthony DiMarco & David Ketchum	March 17, 1981
The girls try to retrieve the nasty note to their boss in order to save their jobs.
129	17	"High Priced Dates"	Jack Winter	Charlotte M. Dobbs	April 7, 1981
The girls go to a lavish dinner with blind dates that then believe they are "owed" something.
130	18	"Fifth Anniversary"	Tom Trbovich	Winifred Hervey & Cheryl Alu	April 14, 1981
Frank and Edna argue on their fifth anniversary when Edna believes Frank has forgotten the day.
131	19	"Out, Out Damned Plout"	Marlene Laird	Paula A. Roth	May 5, 1981
Sergeant Plout goes AWOL after she has her heart broken.
132	20	"Laverne's Broken Leg"	Ray DeVally, Jr.	Anthony DiMarco & David Ketchum	May 12, 1981
After Laverne breaks her leg, an angel shows her how important she is to family and friends.
133	21	"Sing, Sing, Sing"	Cindy Williams	Deborah Raznick & Ria Nepus	May 19, 1981
Carmine and Shirley sing a duet but when Laverne wants to sing too, Squiggy has to be the one to help her.
134	22	"Child's Play"	Gary Menteer	Jeff Franklin & Dana Olsen	May 26, 1981
Shirley puts on a production based on Mother Goose for a Broadway producer in which she and Laverne end up having to play all the parts. Note: This is Betty Garrett's final episode.
