= Laverne & Shirley season 8 =

Laverne & Shirley
- Season 8
- DVD cover
- Starring: Penny Marshall; Cindy Williams; Michael McKean; David Lander; Phil Foster; Eddie Mekka; Leslie Easterbrook
- No. of episodes: 22

Release
- Original network: ABC
- Original release: September 28, 1982 – May 10, 1983

Season chronology
- ← Previous; Season 7

The eighth and final season of Laverne & Shirley, an American television sitcom series, began airing on September 28, 1982 on ABC. The season concluded on May 10, 1983 after 22 episodes.

The season aired Tuesdays at 8:30-9:00 pm (EST). It ranked 25th among television programs and garnered a 17.8 rating. The entire season was released on DVD in North America on May 6, 2014.

== Overview ==
The series had revolved around the longtime friends Laverne DeFazio and Shirley Feeney, although there was to be a massive change early in this season with several cast members departing the series. Shirley (Cindy Williams) permanently leaves the show after episode 2. The character of Shirley marries and moves away, leaving Laverne on her own. Despite this, the show is still titled Laverne & Shirley. Lenny (Michael McKean) was also demoted from the main cast as McKean took time off to film This Is Spinal Tap; he would remain a recurring character, appearing in five episodes.

The changes left Laverne as the main lead, and the only character to appear in every episode of season 8. The other supporting characters (Squiggy, Carmine, Frank, Rhonda) all had episodes which focused on them (alongside Laverne), but they were also each individually absent for a few episodes through the season. The season is set in 1967, remaining (as the show had been since season 6) set in Burbank, California.

== Cast ==
- Penny Marshall as Laverne DeFazio
- David Lander as Andrew "Squiggy" Squiggman (episodes 1, 3, 5, 7, 12-14, 17-21)
- Phil Foster as Frank DeFazio (episodes 1-10, 13, 15-19, 21-22)
- Eddie Mekka as Carmine Ragusa (episodes 1-4, 6-9, 14, 16-22)
- Leslie Easterbrook as Rhonda Lee (episodes 1-8, 10, 16-22)

=== Guest appearances ===
- Cindy Williams as Shirley Feeney (episodes 1 and 2)
- Michael McKean as Leonard "Lenny" Kosnowski (episodes 1, 3, 7, 13 and 18)

== Episodes ==
No. overall	No. in season	Title	Directed by	Written by	Original release date	Prod. code
157	1	"The Mummy's Bride"	Tom Trbovich	Roger Garrett	September 28, 1982	157
Shirley makes plans to marry medic, Walter Meeney, who has been injured and is in the hospital.
158	2	"Window on Main Street"	Tom Trbovich	Al Aidekman	October 12, 1982	158
The roommates have to spend a week in a store display, but make fools of themselves when they're hypnotized into believing they're chickens when they hear a bell. Note: This is Cindy Williams' final episode. Neither Michael McKean nor David L. Lander appears in this episode.
159	3	"The Note"	Gabrielle Alice James	Judy Pioli	October 19, 1982	169
After Shirley leaves to live with her new husband, everyone tries to help Laverne cope with the fact she only received a short note from Shirley saying goodbye. Note: This is the first episode without Cindy Williams.
160	4	"Lost in Spacesuits"	Tom Trbovich	Barry Rubinowitz	October 26, 1982	166
Laverne and her co-worker Chuck get a job testing anti-gravity boots. Note: Neither Michael McKean nor David L. Lander appears in this episode.
161	5	"The Playboy Show"	Michael McKean	Story by : Ed Solomon & Joan Marks; Teleplay by : Ed Solomon	November 9, 1982	160
Laverne decides to become a Playboy bunny. Guest Star: Carrie Fisher; Note: Though Michael McKean directs this episode, he does not appear in it.
162	6	"Death Row: Part 1"	Tom Trbovich	Gene Braunstein & Robert Perlow	November 16, 1982	167
Laverne gets mixed up with a group of radicals who rob a bank. Note: Neither Michael McKean nor David L. Lander appears in this episode.
163	7	"Death Row: Part 2"	Tom Trbovich	Nick LeRose	November 23, 1982	168
Laverne is sent to Death Row by mistake. She soon finds out that she’ll be murdered by midnight.
164	8	"Jinxed"	Tom Trbovich	Tony DiMarco & Dave Ketchum	November 30, 1982	171
Laverne thinks her bad luck is connected to a chain letter. Guest Star: Carol Kane; Note: Neither Michael McKean nor David L. Lander appears in this episode.
165	9	"Of Mice and Men"	Paul Sills	Story by : Susan Jane Lindner & Jack Lukes; Teleplay by : Jill Gordon & Ed Solomon	December 7, 1982	170
Laverne's new boyfriend loses his self-confidence after not being able to protect her and Laverne has to help him. Note: Michael McKean, David L. Lander, and Leslie Easterbrook do not appear in this episode.
166	10	"The Gymnast Show"	Tom Trbovich	Monica Johnson	December 14, 1982	173
Laverne discovers she resembles a circus aerialist's partner, whom he blames for a serious trapeze accident. She ends up thinking he wants to kill her over it. Guest Stars: Adam West as Edgar Garbaldi, Patrick O'Moore as Arthur; Note: Michael McKean, David L. Lander, and Eddie Mekka do not appear in this episode.
167	11	"The Monastery Show"	Garry Marshall	Story by : Ken Sagoes & Nick LaRose; Teleplay by : Jill Gordon & Ed Solomon	January 4, 1983	175
Laverne goes to a monastery for rest and relaxation but finds she must take a vow of silence. Featuring Louise Lasser, and Fran Ryan. Note: Penny Marshall is the only series regular to appear in this episode.
168	12	"Defective Ballet"	Tom Trbovich	Nick LeRose	January 11, 1983	165
Squiggy is mistaken for a defecting Russian dancer. Note: Michael McKean, Eddie Mekka, Leslie Easterbrook and Phil Foster do not appear in this episode.
169	13	"The Baby Show"	Phil Perez	Judy Pioli	January 18, 1983	159
Sgt. Plout enlists Laverne's help in winning an expectant-mothers contest. Note: Leslie Easterbrook does not appear in this episode.
170	14	"Rock & Roll Show"	Chris Thompson	Jill Gordon	January 25, 1983	172
Chuck asks Laverne to manage his band. Note: Michael McKean, Leslie Easterbrook and Phil Foster do not appear in this episode.
171	15	"The Fashion Show"	Tom Trbovich	Roger Garrett & Al Aidekman & Marc Sotkin	February 1, 1983	163
Laverne thinks her photographer boyfriend is spending too much time with models. Note: Michael McKean, David L. Lander, Eddie Mekka, and Leslie Easterbrook do not appear in this episode.
172	16	"Short on Time"	Tom Trbovich	Jack Lukes	February 8, 1983	161
Laverne's commitment to babysitting could hurt her chances of singing with the Spinners. Note: Michael McKean and David L. Lander do not appear in this episode.
173	17	"Ghost Story"	Tom Trbovich	Kenny Wolin & Barry Bleach	February 15, 1983	176
Laverne believes there's a ghost in her apartment and the gang helps her to get rid of it. Note: Michael McKean does not appear in this episode.
174	18	"Please Don't Feed the Buzzards"	Tom Trbovich	Story by : Andy Goldberg & Cheryl Alu; Teleplay by : Andy Goldberg	February 22, 1983	162
Lenny and Squiggy try to keep their treasure map a secret, but they soon have Frank and Carmine along on the treasure hunt. Note: This is Michael McKean's final episode.
175	19	"How's Your Sister?"	Tom Trbovich	Roger Garrett	March 1, 1983	174
Carmine accepts payment to date Squiggy's sister (David L. Lander in a dual role), then comes to regret it when Rhonda invites them to a big party.
176	20	"Do the Carmine"	Tom Trbovich	Jay Grossman	March 15, 1983	164
An activist claims that anti-American propaganda can be heard on Carmine's hit record -- if it is played in reverse.
177	21	"Councilman DeFazio"	Tom Trbovich	Story by : Francis T. Perry Williams & Dottie Archibald; Teleplay by : Dottie Archibald & Phil Foster	May 3, 1983	177
Frank runs for city council in protest of plans to raze Cowboy Bill's for an office complex. Note: This is the final appearance of David L. Lander.
178	22	"Here Today, Hair Tomorrow"	Tom Trbovich	Story by : Susan Jane Lindner & Ken Sagoes; Teleplay by : Susan Jane Lindner	May 10, 1983	178
Carmine moves to the Big Apple to audition for the musical Hair. Note: The episode was produced as a backdoor pilot for a spin-off series for Carmine, who was shown moving to New York City to star in the Broadway show. Laverne, Frank and Rhonda are seen only very briefly; Lenny and Squiggy are not seen at all. The spin-off never materialized.
