= Laverne & Shirley season 3 =

Laverne & Shirley
- Season 3
- DVD cover
- Starring: Penny Marshall; Cindy Williams; Michael McKean; David Lander; Phil Foster; Eddie Mekka; Betty Garrett
- No. of episodes: 24

Release
- Original network: ABC
- Original release: September 20, 1977 – May 30, 1978

Season chronology
- ← Previous; Season 2 Next → Season 4

The third season of Laverne & Shirley, an American television sitcom series, began airing on September 20, 1977 on ABC. The season concluded on May 30, 1978 after 24 episodes.

The season aired Tuesdays at 8:30-9:00 pm (EST). It ranked 1st among television programs and garnered a 31.6 rating. The entire season was released on DVD in North America on November 27, 2007.

== Overview ==
The season revolves around the titular characters Laverne DeFazio and Shirley Feeney, bottle-cappers at Shotz Brewery between 1959 and 1960 in Milwaukee, Wisconsin. Episode plots include their adventures with neighbors and friends, Lenny and Squiggy.

== Cast ==
=== Starring ===
- Penny Marshall as Laverne DeFazio
- Cindy Williams as Shirley Feeney
- Michael McKean as Leonard "Lenny" Kosnowski
- David Lander as Andrew "Squiggy" Squiggman
- Phil Foster as Frank DeFazio
- Eddie Mekka as Carmine Ragusa
- Betty Garrett as Edna Babish

== Episodes ==
No. overall	No. in season	Title	Directed by	Written by	Original release date
39	1	"Airport '59"	Alan Rafkin	Chris Thompson	September 20, 1977
Laverne's first plane trip nearly turns disastrous after she and Shirley accidentally cause the pilot to knock himself unconscious, until Laverne takes the controls.
40	2	"Tag Team Wrestling"	Alan Rafkin	Marc Sotkin	September 27, 1977
Laverne and Shirley wrestle with Amazonians in tag-team wrestling bout for charity.
41	3	"The Pact"	Alan Rafkin	Yvette Weinberger & Mike Weinberger	October 4, 1977
A spoiled playboy woos the girls, leading to a pact in which they swear to never let a guy come between them again.
42	4	"Robot Lawsuit"	Alan Rafkin	Judy Pioli	October 25, 1977
A shyster persuades Laverne to sue a toy store where she was attacked by a robot.
43	5	"Laverne's Arranged Marriage"	Alan Rafkin	Emily Marshall	November 1, 1977
Frank arranges for Laverne to marry a mozzarella tycoon's nephew and Shirley has to intervene.
44 45	6 7	"The Cruise"	Alan Rafkin	Chris Thompson & Babaloo Mandel & Barry Lange	November 8, 1977
The girls sell children's shoes to earn money for a cruise. Later on an ensign woos Shirley on the cruise to the Great Lakes.
46	8	"Laverne and Shirley Meet Fabian"	Alan Rafkin	Paula A. Roth	November 22, 1977
Unable to obtain tickets to a Fabian concert, the girls pose as housekeepers in his hotel in hopes that they can meet the teen idol.
47	9	"The Stakeout"	Alan Rafkin	Barry Rubinowitz	November 29, 1977
The FBI uses the girls' apartment to stake out counterfeiters, one of whom may be Carmine.
48	10	"Shirley's Operation"	Alan Rafkin	David W. Duclon	December 6, 1977
Shirley is in the hospital for a minor operation and runs out in a panic, leading her friends - dressed up for a production of Alice in Wonderland - to track her down.
49	11	"Take My Plants, Please"	Alan Rafkin	Marc Sotkin	December 13, 1977
When the girls are laid off again, they start a plant business that doesn't exactly blossom.
50	12	"New Year's Eve 1960"	Alan Rafkin	Marc Sotkin	December 27, 1977
On New Year's Eve, Laverne's dream date asks her out and Shirley comes down with a New Year's Eve cold.
51	13	"The Mortician"	Alan Rafkin	Laura Levine	January 10, 1978
To get the attention of a handsome mortician, Laverne claims that Shirley is knocking on death's door.
52	14	"The Horse Show"	Alan Rafkin	Judy Pioli	January 17, 1978
Shirley rescues a horse from the glue factory and brings it home.
53	15	"The Slow Child"	Alan Rafkin	Dan E. Weisburd	January 24, 1978
Edna leaves her disabled daughter in the girls' care, but she disappears with Lenny.
54	16	"The Second Almost Annual Shotz Talent Show"	Alan Rafkin	Paula A. Roth	January 31, 1978
The girls are put in charge of the talent show and face the task of finding a place for Mr. Shotz's talentless son.
55	17	"The Dentist"	Alan Rafkin	Babaloo Mandel	February 7, 1978
Shirley's dim-witted dentist cousin tries to fix Laverne's broken tooth.
56	18	"Bus Stop"	Alan Rafkin	Barry Rubinowitz	February 14, 1978
The girls take a bus to a city where they plan to rendezvous with medical students, but are left stranded when the boys run out on them.
57	19	"The Driving Test"	Alan Rafkin	Chris Thompson	February 21, 1978
Squiggy must pass a driving test in order to keep his job, so the girls decide to help him.
58	20	"The Obstacle Course"	Alan Rafkin	Arthur Silver	February 28, 1978
Laverne and Shirley go through a police obstacle course in order to join the Ladies Auxiliary police force.
59	21	"The Debutante Ball"	Alan Rafkin	Paula A. Roth & Judy Pioli	May 9, 1978
Lenny invites Laverne to a royal ball when he learns he's 89th in line to take the Polish throne.
60	22	"2001: A Comedy Odyssey"	Ray DeVally, Jr.	Chris Thompson & Marc Sotkin	May 16, 1978
Laverne dreams that she and Shirley are in their 80s and still without significant others.
61	23	"The Dance Studio"	Ray DeVally, Jr.	Nicholas DeMarco	May 23, 1978
The girls try to help Carmine get a loan for a dance studio. Guest stars: Gerrit Graham as Nathan and Garry Goodrow as Mr. Caulley.
62	24	"Breaking Up and Making Up"	Alan Rafkin	Phil Foster & Marion Zola	May 30, 1978
Edna is visited by her one of her ex-husbands and it makes Frank jealous, so they break-up. Laverne & Shirley then get involved to bring them back together.
