= Laverne & Shirley season 4 =

Laverne & Shirley
- Season 4
- DVD cover
- Starring: Penny Marshall; Cindy Williams; Michael McKean; David Lander; Phil Foster; Eddie Mekka; Betty Garrett
- No. of episodes: 24

Release
- Original network: ABC
- Original release: September 5, 1978 – May 15, 1979

Season chronology
- ← Previous; Season 3 Next → Season 5

The fourth season of Laverne & Shirley, an American television sitcom series, began on September 5, 1978 on ABC. The season concluded on May 15, 1979 after 24 episodes.

The season was broadcast on Tuesdays at 8:30-9:00 pm (EST). It ranked first among television programs and had a 30.5 rating. The entire season was released on DVD in North America on April 22, 2008.

== Overview ==
The series revolves around the titular characters Laverne DeFazio and Shirley Feeney, bottle-cappers at Shotz Brewery in early 1960s Milwaukee, Wisconsin. Episode plots include their adventures with their neighbors and friends, Lenny and Squiggy.

== Cast ==
=== Starring ===
- Penny Marshall as Laverne DeFazio
- Cindy Williams as Shirley Feeney
- Michael McKean as Leonard "Lenny" Kosnowski
- David Lander as Andrew "Squiggy" Squiggman
- Phil Foster as Frank DeFazio
- Eddie Mekka as Carmine Ragusa
- Betty Garrett as Edna Babish

=== Guest starring ===
- Paul Willson as Warren "Eraserhead"
- Larry Hankin as Biff
- Jay Leno as Joey Mitchell
- Robert Alda as Monroe Harrison

== Episodes ==
No. overall	No. in season	Title	Directed by	Written by	Original release date
63 64	1 2	"The Festival"	Alan Myerson	Paula A. Roth & Marc Sotkin	September 5, 1978
The girls go to New York with Frank and Edna to visit Laverne’s grandmother for an Italian festival. The gang decides to climb a greased pole in order to win Frank's mother a trip back to Italy.
65	3	"Playing the Roxy"	Joel Zwick	Paul B. Price & Stephen Nathan	September 19, 1978
After taking a nasty fall, Shirley thinks she is a stripper named Roxy.
66	4	"The Robbery"	Howard Storm	Marc Sotkin	September 26, 1978
Laverne hooks up with a tough guy who turns out to be a robber.
67	5	"The Quiz Show"	Howard Storm	Monica Johnson	October 10, 1978
The girls have to choose between an oven and a "luxury" prize when they win on a quiz show.
68	6	"Laverne and Shirley Go to Night School"	Lowell Ganz	Marc Sotkin	October 17, 1978
Shirley talks Laverne into going to night school with her.
69	7	"Date with Eraserhead"	Ray DeVally, Jr.	Judy Pioli	October 24, 1978
Shirley asks Laverne to get her a hot date to get back at Carmine for cheating on her, but the date ends up being a former classmate "Eraserhead".
70	8	"The Bully Show"	Dennis Klein	Chris Thompson	October 31, 1978
Lenny and Squiggy set up their foreman with Laverne to save their jobs, but he turns out to be a bad guy.
71	9	"A Visit to the Cemetery"	Dennis Klein	Deborah Leschin & David W. Duclon	November 14, 1978
Laverne struggles to go with her father to visit her mother's grave so Lenny ends up helping.
72	10	"Chorus Line"	Joel Zwick	Marc Sotkin	November 21, 1978
Laverne goes to open auditions for West Side Story in Chicago.
73	11	"Laverne and Shirley Move In"	Joel Zwick	Paula A. Roth	November 28, 1978
Shirley reminisces with Edna about when she and Laverne became roommates.
74	12	"Dinner for Four"	Ray DeVally, Jr.	Al Aidekman	December 5, 1978
The girls fix dinner for two guys who find dates with two other girls.
75	13	"It's a Dog's Life"	Joel Zwick	Judy Pioli	December 12, 1978
Shirley handcuffs herself to a dog in protest at the animal's scheduled death at the pound.
76	14	"O, Come All Ye Bums"	Joel Zwick	Paul B. Price & Stephen Nathan	December 19, 1978
The girls raise funds to provide Christmas dinner for the homeless.
77	15	"Who's Papa?"	Maurice Bar-David	Story by : Zoey Wilson & Al Aidekman; Teleplay by : Al Aidekman	January 16, 1979
Shirley hatches a plan to find out if she's adopted.
78	16	"The Third Annual Shotz Talent Show"	Joel Zwick	Paul B. Price & Stephen Nathan	January 30, 1979
Lenny and Squiggy direct the talent show, but when it falls apart, the girls step in to help.
79	17	"Supermarket Sweep"	Joel Zwick	Ron Leavitt	February 6, 1979
Laverne and Shirley are given everyone's shopping list when they win a supermarket spree.
80	18	"Lenny's Crush"	Carl Gottlieb	Judy Pioli	February 13, 1979
Lenny develops a crush on Laverne.
81	19	"Fire Show"	Joel Zwick	Jeff Franklin	February 20, 1979
When Shirley accidentally sets Laverne's bed on fire, one of the firemen woos Laverne.
82	20	"Squiggy in Love"	Penny Marshall	Barry Rubinowitz	February 27, 1979
Squiggy is unaware that his dream girl is using him.
83	21	"The Feminine Mistake"	Joel Zwick	Chris Thompson	March 6, 1979
Shirley gives Laverne advice on femininity to impress a man who thinks of her as "one of the boys".
84	22	"The Tenants Are Revolting"	Joel Zwick	Rob Harris	March 13, 1979
The building needs major repairs so to save Edna the cost, the tenants team up to make the repairs themselves.
85	23	"There's a Spy in My Beer"	Joel Zwick	Julie Mishkin	May 8, 1979
Laverne tries to convince everyone that a spy is in the brewery.
86	24	"Shirley and the Older Man"	Joel Zwick	Barry Rubinowitz	May 15, 1979
Carmine is upset that Shirley is dating an older man that can take her places he can't afford, while the man's daughter thinks she is a gold-digger.
