= List of Laverne & Shirley episodes =

The following is a list of episodes from the 1970s/1980s TV series Laverne & Shirley. A total of 178 half-hour episodes were produced, spanning 8 seasons.

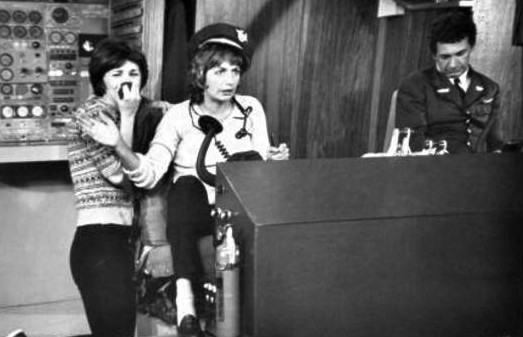
When they accidentally knock their plane's pilot out, it is up to the girls to fly the plane.

== Series overview ==
Season	Episodes	Originally released		Rank	Rating
Season	Episodes	First released	Last released	Rank	Rating
1	15	January 27, 1976	May 18, 1976	3	27.5
2	23	September 28, 1976	April 5, 1977	2	30.9
3	24	September 20, 1977	May 30, 1978	1	31.6
4	24	September 5, 1978	May 15, 1979	1	30.5
5	26	September 13, 1979	May 13, 1980	42	—N/a
6	22	November 18, 1980	May 26, 1981	20 (Note: Tied with Monday Night Football.)	20.6
7	22	October 13, 1981	May 11, 1982	20	19.9
8	22	September 28, 1982	May 10, 1983	25	17.8

== Episodes ==
=== Season 1 (1976) ===
No. overall	No. in season	Title	Directed by	Written by	Original release date
1	1	"The Society Party"	Garry Marshall	Bob Brunner	January 27, 1976
2	2	"The Bachelor Party"	Jerry Paris	Lowell Ganz & Mark Rothman	February 3, 1976
3	3	"Bowling for Razzberries"	Alan Myerson	Marty Nadler	February 10, 1976
4	4	"A Nun's Story"	Alan Myerson	Michael Warren & William Bickley	February 24, 1976
5	5	"Falter at the Altar"	Jay Sandrich	Arthur Silver	March 2, 1976
6	6	"Dog Day Blind Dates"	James Burrows	Dale McRaven	March 9, 1976
7	7	"Once Upon a Rumor"	Howard Storm	Holly Mascott	March 16, 1976
8	8	"One Flew Over Milwaukee"	Michael Kidd	Michael Warren & William Bickley	March 23, 1976
9	9	"Dating Slump"	Alan Myerson	Arthur Silver	March 30, 1976
10	10	"It's the Water"	Dennis Klein	Greg Strangis	April 6, 1976
11	11	"Fakeout at the Stakeout"	Alan Myerson	Deborah Leschin & David W. Duclon	April 13, 1976
12	12	"Hi, Neighbors"	Alan Myerson	Michael McKean & David L. Lander & Harry Shearer	April 27, 1976
13	13	"How Do You Say 'Are You Dead' in German?"	John Thomas Lenox	Bob Brunner	May 4, 1976
14	14	"From Suds to Stardom"	James Burrows	Buz Kohan	May 11, 1976
15	15	"Mother Knows Worst"	Alan Myerson	Arthur Silver	May 18, 1976

=== Season 2 (1976–77) ===
No. overall	No. in season	Title	Directed by	Written by	Original release date
16	1	"Drive! She Said"	Howard Storm	Jack Winter	September 28, 1976
17	2	"Angels of Mercy"	Howard Storm	Michael Warren & William Bickley	October 5, 1976
18	3	"Bachelor Mothers"	Howard Storm	Barry Rubinowitz	October 19, 1976
19	4	"Excuse Me, May I Cut In?"	John Thomas Lenox	Fred Fox, Jr.	October 26, 1976
20	5	"Bridal Shower"	Alan Myerson	Paula A. Roth & Judy Skelton	November 9, 1976
21	6	"Look Before You Leap"	James Burrows	Deborah Leschin & David W. Duclon	November 16, 1976
22	7	"Dear Future Model"	James Burrows	Story by : Barbara Robles; Teleplay by : Barbara Robles & Judy Skelton	November 23, 1976
23	8	"Good Time Girls"	James Burrows	Laura Levine	November 30, 1976
24	9	"Two of Our Weirdos Are Missing"	Howard Storm	Bob Sand & Bo Kaprall	December 7, 1976
25	10	"Christmas at the Booby Hatch" "Oh, Hear the Angel Voices"	Howard Storm	David W. Duclon	December 21, 1976
26	11	"Guilty Until Proven Not Innocent"	James Burrows	Bob Sand & Bo Kaprall	January 4, 1977
27	12	"Anniversary Show" "The Laverne & Shirley Birthday Show"	John Thomas Lenox	Paula A. Roth & Roger Garrett	January 10, 1977
28	13	"Playing Hooky"	John Thomas Lenox	Barry Rubinowitz	January 11, 1977
29	14	"Guinea Pigs"	James Burrows	Jack Winter	January 18, 1977
30	15	"Call Me a Taxi"	Alan Myerson	Deborah Leschin & Paula A. Roth	February 1, 1977
31	16	"Steppin' Out"	Dennis Klein	Deborah Leschin	February 8, 1977
32	17	"Buddy, Can You Spare a Father?"	Ray DeVally, Jr.	Monica Johnson & Eric Cohen	February 15, 1977
33	18	"Honeymoon Hotel"	Gary Shimokawa	Monica Johnson & Eric Cohen	February 22, 1977
34	19	"Hi, Neighbors: Book 2"	Ray DeVally, Jr.	Michael McKean & Davy L. Lander	March 1, 1977
35	20	"Frank's Fling"	Howard Morris	William J. Keenan	March 8, 1977
36	21	"Haunted House"	Alan Myerson	Andrew Johnson	March 22, 1977
37	22	"Lonely at the Middle"	James Burrows	Jack Winter	March 29, 1977
38	23	"Citizen Crane"	Ray DeVally, Jr.	Raymond Siller	April 5, 1977

=== Season 3 (1977–78) ===
No. overall	No. in season	Title	Directed by	Written by	Original release date
39	1	"Airport '59"	Alan Rafkin	Chris Thompson	September 20, 1977
40	2	"Tag Team Wrestling"	Alan Rafkin	Marc Sotkin	September 27, 1977
41	3	"The Pact"	Alan Rafkin	Yvette Weinberger & Mike Weinberger	October 4, 1977
42	4	"Robot Lawsuit"	Alan Rafkin	Judy Pioli	October 25, 1977
43	5	"Laverne's Arranged Marriage"	Alan Rafkin	Emily Marshall	November 1, 1977
44 45	6 7	"The Cruise"	Alan Rafkin	Chris Thompson & Babaloo Mandel & Barry Lange	November 8, 1977
46	8	"Laverne and Shirley Meet Fabian"	Alan Rafkin	Paula A. Roth	November 22, 1977
47	9	"The Stakeout"	Alan Rafkin	Barry Rubinowitz	November 29, 1977
48	10	"Shirley's Operation"	Alan Rafkin	David W. Duclon	December 6, 1977
49	11	"Take My Plants, Please"	Alan Rafkin	Marc Sotkin	December 13, 1977
50	12	"New Year's Eve 1960"	Alan Rafkin	Marc Sotkin	December 27, 1977
51	13	"The Mortician"	Alan Rafkin	Laura Levine	January 10, 1978
52	14	"The Horse Show"	Alan Rafkin	Judy Pioli	January 17, 1978
53	15	"The Slow Child"	Alan Rafkin	Dan E. Weisburd	January 24, 1978
54	16	"The Second Almost Annual Shotz Talent Show"	Alan Rafkin	Paula A. Roth	January 31, 1978
55	17	"The Dentist"	Alan Rafkin	Babaloo Mandel	February 7, 1978
56	18	"Bus Stop"	Alan Rafkin	Barry Rubinowitz	February 14, 1978
57	19	"The Driving Test"	Alan Rafkin	Chris Thompson	February 21, 1978
58	20	"The Obstacle Course"	Alan Rafkin	Arthur Silver	February 28, 1978
59	21	"The Debutante Ball"	Alan Rafkin	Paula A. Roth & Judy Pioli	May 9, 1978
60	22	"2001: A Comedy Odyssey"	Ray DeVally, Jr.	Chris Thompson & Marc Sotkin	May 16, 1978
61	23	"The Dance Studio"	Ray DeVally, Jr.	Nicholas DeMarco	May 23, 1978
62	24	"Breaking Up and Making Up"	Alan Rafkin	Phil Foster & Marion Zola	May 30, 1978

=== Season 4 (1978–79) ===
No. overall	No. in season	Title	Directed by	Written by	Original release date
63 64	1 2	"The Festival"	Alan Myerson	Paula A. Roth & Marc Sotkin	September 5, 1978
65	3	"Playing the Roxy"	Joel Zwick	Paul B. Price & Stephen Nathan	September 19, 1978
66	4	"The Robbery"	Howard Storm	Marc Sotkin	September 26, 1978
67	5	"The Quiz Show"	Howard Storm	Monica Johnson	October 10, 1978
68	6	"Laverne and Shirley Go to Night School"	Lowell Ganz	Marc Sotkin	October 17, 1978
69	7	"Date with Eraserhead"	Ray DeVally, Jr.	Judy Pioli	October 24, 1978
70	8	"The Bully Show"	Dennis Klein	Chris Thompson	October 31, 1978
71	9	"A Visit to the Cemetery"	Dennis Klein	Deborah Leschin & David W. Duclon	November 14, 1978
72	10	"Chorus Line"	Joel Zwick	Marc Sotkin	November 21, 1978
73	11	"Laverne and Shirley Move In"	Joel Zwick	Paula A. Roth	November 28, 1978
74	12	"Dinner for Four"	Ray DeVally, Jr.	Al Aidekman	December 5, 1978
75	13	"It's a Dog's Life"	Joel Zwick	Judy Pioli	December 12, 1978
76	14	"O, Come All Ye Bums"	Joel Zwick	Paul B. Price & Stephen Nathan	December 19, 1978
77	15	"Who's Papa?"	Maurice Bar-David	Story by : Zoey Wilson & Al Aidekman; Teleplay by : Al Aidekman	January 16, 1979
78	16	"The Third Annual Shotz Talent Show"	Joel Zwick	Paul B. Price & Stephen Nathan	January 30, 1979
79	17	"Supermarket Sweep"	Joel Zwick	Ron Leavitt	February 6, 1979
80	18	"Lenny's Crush"	Carl Gottlieb	Judy Pioli	February 13, 1979
81	19	"Fire Show"	Joel Zwick	Jeff Franklin	February 20, 1979
82	20	"Squiggy in Love"	Penny Marshall	Barry Rubinowitz	February 27, 1979
83	21	"The Feminine Mistake"	Joel Zwick	Chris Thompson	March 6, 1979
84	22	"The Tenants Are Revolting"	Joel Zwick	Rob Harris	March 13, 1979
85	23	"There's a Spy in My Beer"	Joel Zwick	Julie Mishkin	May 8, 1979
86	24	"Shirley and the Older Man"	Joel Zwick	Barry Rubinowitz	May 15, 1979

=== Season 5 (1979–80) ===
No. overall	No. in season	Title	Directed by	Written by	Original release date
87	1	"Shotgun Wedding: Part 2"	Joel Zwick	Judy Pioli	September 13, 1979
88	2	"One Heckuva Note"	Joel Zwick	Jeff Franklin	September 20, 1979
89	3	"Fat City Holiday"	Joel Zwick	Roger Garrett	September 27, 1979
90	4	"Upstairs, Downstairs"	Joel Zwick	Al Aidekman	October 4, 1979
91	5	"What Do You Do with a Drunken Sailor?"	Joel Zwick	Chris Thompson & Gary H. Miller	October 18, 1979
92	6	"You've Pushed Me Too Far"	Joel Zwick	Jeff Franklin	October 25, 1979
93	7	"The Wedding"	Joel Zwick	Paula A. Roth	November 1, 1979
94	8	"Bad Girls"	Joel Zwick	Barry Rubinowitz	November 8, 1979
95	9	"We're in the Army, Now"	Joel Zwick	Judy Pioli & Jeff Franklin	November 15, 1979
96	10	"We're in the Army, Now"	Joel Zwick	Judy Pioli & Jeff Franklin	November 15, 1979
97	11	"Take Two, They're Small"	Ray DeVally, Jr.	Paula A. Roth & Judy Pioli	November 22, 1979
98	12	"The Fourth Annual Shotz Talent Show"	Joel Zwick	Chris Thompson	December 6, 1979
99	13	"Testing, Testing"	Joel Zwick	Story by : Kenny Rich; Teleplay by : Chris Thompson	December 13, 1979
100	14	"Not Quite South of the Border"	Joel Zwick	Deborah Leschin & Susan Seeger	January 7, 1980
101	15	"You Oughta Be in Pictures"	Joel Zwick	Jeff Franklin	January 14, 1980
102	16	"The Beatnik Show"	Joel Zwick	Barry Rubinowitz & Al Aidekman	January 21, 1980
103	17	"The Right to Light"	Joel Zwick	Kenny Rich	January 28, 1980
104	18	"Why Did the Fireman...?"	Joel Zwick	Roger Garrett	February 4, 1980
105	19	"The Collector"	Joel Zwick	Story by : Linda Segall & John Byers; Teleplay by : Jeff Young & Frank Alesia	February 11, 1980
106	20	"Murder on the Moosejaw Express: Part 1"	Joel Zwick	Richard Rosenstock & Jack Lukes	February 26, 1980
107	21	"Murder on the Moosejaw Express: Part 2"	Joel Zwick	Charlotte M. Dobbs & Jeff Franklin	March 4, 1980
108	22	"Survival Test"	Joel Zwick	Story by : Richard Gurman; Teleplay by : Roger Garrett & Al Aidekman	March 11, 1980
109	23	"Antonio, the Amazing"	Maurice Bar-David	Cindy Begel & Lesa Kite	March 18, 1980
110	24	"The Duke of Squiggman"	Penny Marshall	Jeff Franklin	March 25, 1980
111	25	"The Diner"	Linda McMurray	Bob Perlow	May 6, 1980
112	26	"Separate Tables"	Frank Alesia	Deborah Raznick & Ria Nepus	May 13, 1980

=== Season 6 (1980–81) ===
No. overall	No. in season	Title	Directed by	Written by	Original release date
113	1	"Not Quite New York"	John Tracy	Jeff Franklin	November 18, 1980
114	2	"Welcome to Burbank"	John Tracy	Jeff Franklin	November 25, 1980
115	3	"Studio City"	John Tracy	Richard Rosenstock	December 2, 1980
116	4	"Grand Opening"	John Tracy	Ruth Bennett	December 9, 1980
117	5	"Candy Is Dandy"	John Tracy	Joanne Pagliaro	December 16, 1980
118	6	"The Dating Game"	Penny Marshall	Al Aidekman	December 30, 1980
119	7	"The Other Woman"	Arthur Silver	Joanne Pagliaro	January 6, 1981
120	8	"The Road to Burbank"	Frank Alesia	Jeff Franklin	January 13, 1981
121	9	"Born Too Late"	Alan Myerson	Roger Garrett	January 27, 1981
122	10	"Love Out the Window"	Linda McMurray	Ruth Bennett	February 3, 1981
123	11	"Malibu Mansion"	Frank Alesia	Anthony DiMarco & David Ketchum	February 10, 1981
124	12	"To Tell the Truth"	Jack Winter	Al Aidekman	February 17, 1981
125	13	"I Do, I Do"	Phil Perez	Cindy Begel & Lesa Kite	February 24, 1981
126	14	"But Seriously, Folks..."	Penny Marshall	Jeff Franklin	March 3, 1981
127	15	"The Bardwell Caper: Part 1"	Tom Trbovich	Anthony DiMarco & David Ketchum	March 10, 1981
128	16	"The Bardwell Caper: Part 2"	Tom Trbovich	Anthony DiMarco & David Ketchum	March 17, 1981
129	17	"High Priced Dates"	Jack Winter	Charlotte M. Dobbs	April 7, 1981
130	18	"Fifth Anniversary"	Tom Trbovich	Winifred Hervey & Cheryl Alu	April 14, 1981
131	19	"Out, Out Damned Plout"	Marlene Laird	Paula A. Roth	May 5, 1981
132	20	"Laverne's Broken Leg"	Ray DeVally, Jr.	Anthony DiMarco & David Ketchum	May 12, 1981
133	21	"Sing, Sing, Sing"	Cindy Williams	Deborah Raznick & Ria Nepus	May 19, 1981
134	22	"Child's Play"	Gary Menteer	Jeff Franklin & Dana Olsen	May 26, 1981

=== Season 7 (1981–82) ===
No. overall	No. in season	Title	Directed by	Written by	Original release date	Prod. code
135	1	"The Most Important Day Ever"	Tom Trbovich	Gene Braunstein & Robert Perlow	October 13, 1981	136
136	2	"It Only Hurts When I Breathe"	Tom Trbovich	Al Aidekman	October 27, 1981	137
137	3	"I Wonder What Became of Sal?"	Tom Trbovich	Mark Rothman	November 3, 1981	147
138	4	"Young at Heart" "Teenage Lust"	Tom Trbovich	Dana Olsen	November 10, 1981	141
139	5	"The Defiant One"	Tom Trbovich	Judy Pioli	November 17, 1981	138
140	6	"Night at the Awards"	Tom Trbovich	Roger Garrett	November 24, 1981	135
141	7	"Some Enchanted Earring"	Tom Trbovich	David Lerner & Bruce Ferber	December 1, 1981	139
142	8	"Moving In"	Tom Trbovich	Terry Hart	December 8, 1981	142
143	9	"Friendly Persuasion"	Tom Trbovich	Wally Dalton	December 15, 1981	140
144	10	"I Do, I Don't"	Tom Trbovich	Cindy Begel & Lesa Kite	January 5, 1982	144
145	11	"Love Is the Tar Pits"	Tom Trbovich	Roger Garrett	January 12, 1982	143
146	12	"Watch the Fur Fly"	Jack Winter	Bob Howard	January 19, 1982	149
147	13	"Rocky Ragu"	Tom Trbovich	Albert Goodman	January 26, 1982	146
148	14	"Star Peepers"	Jack Winter	Larry Levinson & Barry O'Brien	February 2, 1982	150
149	15	"An Affair to Forget"	Jack Winter	Steve Granat & Mel Sherer	February 9, 1982	148
150	16	"Whatever Happened to the Class of '56?"	Phil Perez	Paula A. Roth	February 16, 1982	145
151	17	"Ski Show"	Tom Trbovich	Judy Pioli & Marc Sotkin	February 23, 1982	153
152	18	"Helmut Weekend"	Tom Trbovich	Roger Garrett	March 2, 1982	151
153	19	"That's Entertainment"	Gary Menteer	Etan McElroy & Larry Strawther	March 9, 1982	156
154	20	"Lightning Man"	Tom Trbovich	Jack Lukes & Shelly Goldstein	March 16, 1982	154
155	21	"Crime Isn't Pretty"	Tom Trbovich	Al Aidekman & Nick LeRose	May 4, 1982	155
156	22	"Perfidy in Blue"	Tom Trbovich	Laurie Gelman	May 11, 1982	152

=== Season 8 (1982–83) ===
No. overall	No. in season	Title	Directed by	Written by	Original release date	Prod. code
157	1	"The Mummy's Bride"	Tom Trbovich	Roger Garrett	September 28, 1982	157
158	2	"Window on Main Street"	Tom Trbovich	Al Aidekman	October 12, 1982	158
159	3	"The Note"	Gabrielle Alice James	Judy Pioli	October 19, 1982	169
160	4	"Lost in Spacesuits"	Tom Trbovich	Barry Rubinowitz	October 26, 1982	166
161	5	"The Playboy Show"	Michael McKean	Story by : Ed Solomon & Joan Marks; Teleplay by : Ed Solomon	November 9, 1982	160
162	6	"Death Row: Part 1"	Tom Trbovich	Gene Braunstein & Robert Perlow	November 16, 1982	167
163	7	"Death Row: Part 2"	Tom Trbovich	Nick LeRose	November 23, 1982	168
164	8	"Jinxed"	Tom Trbovich	Tony DiMarco & Dave Ketchum	November 30, 1982	171
165	9	"Of Mice and Men"	Paul Sills	Story by : Susan Jane Lindner & Jack Lukes; Teleplay by : Jill Gordon & Ed Solomon	December 7, 1982	170
166	10	"The Gymnast Show"	Tom Trbovich	Monica Johnson	December 14, 1982	173
167	11	"The Monastery Show"	Garry Marshall	Story by : Ken Sagoes & Nick LaRose; Teleplay by : Jill Gordon & Ed Solomon	January 4, 1983	175
168	12	"Defective Ballet"	Tom Trbovich	Nick LeRose	January 11, 1983	165
169	13	"The Baby Show"	Phil Perez	Judy Pioli	January 18, 1983	159
170	14	"Rock & Roll Show"	Chris Thompson	Jill Gordon	January 25, 1983	172
171	15	"The Fashion Show"	Tom Trbovich	Roger Garrett & Al Aidekman & Marc Sotkin	February 1, 1983	163
172	16	"Short on Time"	Tom Trbovich	Jack Lukes	February 8, 1983	161
173	17	"Ghost Story"	Tom Trbovich	Kenny Wolin & Barry Bleach	February 15, 1983	176
174	18	"Please Don't Feed the Buzzards"	Tom Trbovich	Story by : Andy Goldberg & Cheryl Alu; Teleplay by : Andy Goldberg	February 22, 1983	162
175	19	"How's Your Sister?"	Tom Trbovich	Roger Garrett	March 1, 1983	174
176	20	"Do the Carmine"	Tom Trbovich	Jay Grossman	March 15, 1983	164
177	21	"Councilman DeFazio"	Tom Trbovich	Story by : Francis T. Perry Williams & Dottie Archibald; Teleplay by : Dottie Archibald & Phil Foster	May 3, 1983	177
178	22	"Here Today, Hair Tomorrow"	Tom Trbovich	Story by : Susan Jane Lindner & Ken Sagoes; Teleplay by : Susan Jane Lindner	May 10, 1983	178

== Reunion specials ==
Title	Directed by	Written by	Original air date
"The Laverne & Shirley Reunion"	Malcolm Leo	Sam Denoff & Malcolm Leo	May 22, 1995
A one-hour-long retrospective special celebrating the show's 20th anniversary hosted by Henry Winkler and featuring Penny Marshall, Cindy Williams, Michael McKean, David Lander, Eddie Mekka and Garry Marshall.
"Laverne & Shirley: Together Again"	Miguel Enciso	Judy Pioli Askin	May 7, 2002
A reunion special presented by Entertainment Tonight and taped in front of a live audience with the cast reminiscing about their time on the show. Penny Marshall and Cindy Williams reprise their roles in a comedy sketch where they try being contestants on a Survivor-type island reality show.

== See also ==
- List of Happy Days episodes—includes part 1 of "Shotgun Wedding".
