= UFOria =

1985 science fiction comedy film

- VHS release art
- Directed by: John Binder
- Written by: John Binder
- Produced by: Melvin Simon Productions
- Starring: Fred Ward; Cindy Williams; Harry Dean Stanton
- Cinematography: David Myers
- Distributed by: Universal Pictures (U.S.); CIC (overseas)
- Release date: October 1985
- Running time: 93 minutes
- Language: English
- Budget: $5 million

UFOria is a science fiction comedy film written and directed by John Binder and starring Fred Ward, Harry Dean Stanton, Harry Carey, Jr. and Cindy Williams. The film includes small appearances by Peggy McKay, Joe Unger, Hank Worden, Charlotte Stewart, and Alan Beckwith. Filming was completed in 1981, but the film was not theatrically released until 1985.

== Plot ==
Sheldon Bart is a drifter, and a small-time con man. He meets his old friend, Brother Bud Sanders, a big-time con man into faith healing and fencing stolen cars, at his revival tent outside a small town. Bud has developed a real ability to heal, although he has no idea how this has happened. While he's helping Brother Bud, Sheldon falls in love with Arlene Stewart, a local supermarket clerk who believes in UFOs and is deeply religious and deeply lonely. When Arlene has a vision of a coming UFO, everyone deals with it in his own way. Brother Bud begins to twist Arlene's belief and visions into a new pseudoreligious cult.

== Cast ==
- Cindy Williams as Arlene Stewart
- Fred Ward as Sheldon Bart
- Harry Dean Stanton as Brother Bud Sanders
- Harry Carey, Jr. as George Martin
- Beverly Hope Atkinson as Naomi
- Diane Adair as Delores
- Robert Gray as Emile
- Ted Harris as Gregory
- Peggy McCay as Celia Martin
- Darrell Larson as Toby

== Release ==
=== Theatrical ===
Produced by Melvin Simon Productions, it was initially slated to be released by 20th Century-Fox as part of their long-term distribution agreement. However, the studio shelved it after deeming it unmarketable. Upset with their decision, but fearful of retaliation, Binder persuaded them to allow him to find another distributor, and Universal acquired the film in 1983. Universal test-released the film in two markets under the title Hold Onto Your Dreams to disappointing returns, and initially chose to abandon it as well.
UFOria played at the 1984 Filmex Festival in July 1984, where it was positively received. Based on this reaction, Landmark Theaters booked the film in 1985 for showings in Los Angeles, San Francisco, and Boston, without advertising support from the studio. Exhibitor J.D. Pollack booked the film at the Bleecker Street Cinema in January 1986, and personally funded his own advertising campaign, hiring publicist Lauren Hyman to promote the film. A glowing review from The New York Times spurred Universal to expand the release to more cities, with advertising support. Despite enthusiastic reviews from Roger Ebert and other critics, it did not find a broad audience in its theatrical run.

=== Home media ===
Due to licensing complications surrounding the film's extensive use of country songs, including hits from Waylon Jennings, the film did not reach VHS until 1987, with some of its music rescored, and was subsequently unavailable on DVD or Blu-ray. After many years of scarce availability, Kino Lorber reissued the film in a new 4K remaster on Blu-ray and Ultra HD Blu-ray on April 14, 2026.

== Reception ==
The film received mostly positive reviews. Roger Ebert gave the film a 4 star review, calling the film a "great and goofy comedy", concluding with "Like Repo Man, Turtle Diary and Hannah and Her Sisters, it is willing to go for originality in a world that prizes the entertainment assembly line."

Vincent Canby of The New York Times wrote that the film has a "raffish tone" and is "exuberantly nutty"; he also praised the casting. Kevin Thomas, writing for the Los Angeles Times concluded his review with, "Williams manages to be adorable and never seems all-out crazy; like Ward, you do believe in her, whether or not you believe in UFOs."

The KTVU Creature Features host John Stanley's movie guide gave the movie 3 out of 5 stars, finding the film eccentric but entertaining, stating the movie was a compelling character study with a surprise ending.
