= Night of the Cobra Woman =

- Directed by: Andrew Meyer
- Written by: Andrew Meyer
- Based on: Story by Andrew Meyer; Kerry Magness
- Starring: Joy Bang; Marlene Clark; Roger Garrett; Vic Diaz
- Music by: Restituto Umali
- Production companies: New World Pictures; Premiere Productions
- Distributed by: New World Pictures
- Release date: January 1, 1972
- Running time: 85 minutes
- Countries: United States; Philippines
- Language: English

Night of the Cobra Woman is a 1972 American horror film starring Joy Bang, Marlene Clark, and Roger Garrett.

It was co-produced by New World Pictures and shot in the Philippines. Roger Corman expressed great disappointment in the final product, and thought its main problem was that the script badly lacked logic.

== Plot ==
Lena, a young nurse in World War II Philippines, is bitten by a firebrand cobra while picking herbs with her friend Francisca. Francisca is raped then shot by a Japanese soldier, but Lena, now conscious but bonded to the cobra, comes out and cures her.

Thirty years later Joanna, an UNICEF snake antivenom researcher learns about the firebrand cobra from Dr. Zeton, but when she arrives at Lena's house, but is turned away and later scared by Lope, Francisca's son, who made love with Lena and became old and seemingly mentally disabled.

Joanna meets her boyfriend, Duff, and while going into the city they meet an American Captain on leave from the Vietnam war. As they let the soldier go, Duff sees an eagle which he buys as it reminds him of a pet eagle he had as a child. Joanna and Duff make love, before she goes to the laboratory, and Duff goes to see this snake woman. While hiking up the mountain the cobra, Movini, bites him. Lena sucks the poison out, and Duff awakes in her house. He learns about what happened to Lope and Francesca. He tells Francesca to go to Joanna, and to bring his eagle with her. Duff later goes into Lena's cave, where she is extracting Movini's venom.

When Joanna arrives she is informed by Lena that Duff is recovering from the snake bite, but Joanna steals some of the venom. Lena realizes this and sends Movini to bite her. Instead Francisca gets in the way and is bitten, and Duff's eagle fights and kills Movini, then dies from poisoned mangos.

With Movini dead Lena must feed on the life force of young men or she will turn into the firebrand cobra herself. The first is Duff. As he starts to turn old Lena gives him the last of Movini's venom, but there is only enough for one dose. She also reveals that the serpent has been keping her young for thirty years.

In the city Joanna and Dr. Tezon are testing the venom on a monkey, who at first seems to be doing well, but they realize that the venom must be administered regularly, or the subject will die.

Lena and Duff go to the city for Duff to steal the venom, but he spills it, and Lena makes love to a man, stealing his youth, then sheds her skin like a snake. They meet the soldier and his friends at a cock fight, but Lena is scratched by a rooster, and she leaks venom instead of blood. But she must still make love to young men. On the way back from the city Lena makes love to a young farmer. Duff is initially disappointed, but realizes she must have a new man. Returning to the city, Duff finds the soldiers. The Captain tries to harm and rape Lena, but she transforms into a snake and kills him, then goes to Dr. Tezon's laboratory and bites and kills him as well.

Duff wakes up in Joanna's apartment, and he confesses he's afraid, but not of what, and they again make love while Lena, as the firebrand cobra, observes them. Duff sees the cobra and is hypnotized and leaves. Joanna wakes with Duff gone finds shed snake skin left by Lena.

Back at the cave temple, where Lope is hiding, Duff arrives with Lena as the cobra, and transforms back into a Human, but prays to Domala and wishes to be a snake, to rid herself of emotions and "fruitless and destructive unions". She consoles Duff, that he will stay young as long as she, as a serpent, is alive, but Duff doesn't want to grow old and die, but Lena assures him he will stay Human as long as he protects her. She then transforms into the cobra again. Lope tries to kill it by chopping it with a knife, but from each segment a new cobra is created. They attack Lope and he dies, knocking over a brazier and setting the cave ablaze.

Joanna arrives at the village searching for Duff, and while searching through Lena's hut, the cobras attack her. Duff, now half transformed, begs Movini to spare Joanna, then tells her she needs to go, but Joanna refuses, which causes the snakes to threaten her, so she leaves. Duff is bitten and undergoes the same type of transformation Lena did at the start of the movie. In the last scene Joanna, outside of Lena's hut, picks a mango and eats it.

== Cast ==
- Joy Bang as Joanna
- Marlene Clark as Lena Aruza
- Roger Garrett as Stan Duff
- Vic Diaz as Japanese Soldier / Lopé
- Rosemarie Gil as Francisca, Lope's mother
- Vic Silayan as Dr. Tezon

== Release ==
=== Home media ===
The film was released for the first time on Blu-ray on July 5, 2017, by Scorpion Releasing.

== Reception ==
Dennis Schwartz from Ozus' World Movie Reviews awarded the film a grade C−, criticizing the film's acting, poor direction, and cheap production values. TV Guide awarded the film 1/5 stars, calling it "silly" and 'not particularly scary'.

== See also ==
- List of American films of 1972
- The Lair of the White Worm (1988), a film in which the female antagonist also has the supernatural ability to transform herself into a venomous snake.
