= Visiting Angels Home Care =

U.S. senior home care company

Visiting Angels (Living Assistance Services, Inc.)
- Founded: 1998
- Founder: Larry Meigs
- Headquarters: Bryn Mawr, PA, United States
- Website: visitingangels.com

Visiting Angels is a U.S.-based franchise network providing non-medical home care services. The company’s legal name is Living Assistance Services, Inc., and it was founded in Bryn Mawr, Pennsylvania in 1998.

Visiting Angels provides in-home care services for older adults and individuals with disabilities who require assistance with daily activities. These home care services include, but are not limited to, companion care, palliative care, Parkinson’s disease care, dementia and Alzheimer’s disease care, and respite care.

== Company History ==
Visiting Angels was founded by Larry Meigs in 1998. As of 2026, the Visiting Angels network operates more than 550 franchises across the United States.

In June 2026, Visiting Angels appointed Scott Parrish as president. Parrish joined the company in 2008 and previously held general-manager and executive positions. Parrish served in the United States Navy for 21 years before joining Visiting Angels. Founder Larry Meigs remained as chief executive officer.

== International Franchises ==
Visiting Angels has expanded internationally into the United Kingdom, Mexico, South Korea, and Canada. Visiting Angels began their international expansion in 1998. They started franchise operations in Canada under the brand name Senior Home Care by Angels in 2000. They opened franchises in Mexico in 2014, South Korea in 2007, and the United Kingdom in 2017.

== Accreditations & Awards ==
In addition to local and regional honors awarded to specific franchises, Visiting Angels has won Best of Home Care awards from Activated Insights.

Franchise Business Review ranked Visiting Angels #1 among senior care franchises. Visiting Angels has also been included in Entrepreneur Magazine’s “Franchise 500” list of top franchising opportunities. In 2025, the company was included on a list of the top 400 franchising opportunities published by Franchise Times.

Visiting Angels awards Caregiver of the Year honorees each year. Tiffany Moon from Charleston, South Carolina, won the 2026 Caregiver of the Year award.

== Philanthropy ==
In 2017, Visiting Angels launched the Visiting Angels Foundation, a non-profit organization that helps seniors access personal and medical care. In 2026, the Foundation donated $100,000 to Meals on Wheels America.
