= Laverne & Shirley =

American television sitcom (1976–1983)

- Genre: Sitcom
- Created by: Garry Marshall; Lowell Ganz; Mark Rothman
- Starring: Penny Marshall; Cindy Williams; Michael McKean; David Lander; Eddie Mekka; Phil Foster; Betty Garrett; Leslie Easterbrook
- Theme music composer: Norman Gimbel (lyrics); Charles Fox
- Opening theme: "Making Our Dreams Come True", performed by Cyndi Grecco
- Composers: John Beal; Frank Comstock; Charles Fox; Jack Hayes
- Country of origin: United States
- Original language: English
- No. of seasons: 8
- No. of episodes: 178 (list of episodes)

Production
- Executive producers: Garry Marshall; Thomas L. Miller; Edward K. Milkis
- Producers: Mark Rothman; Lowell Ganz
- Running time: 22–24 minutes
- Production companies: Henderson Productions; Miller-Milkis Productions (seasons 1–6); Miller-Milkis-Boyett Productions (seasons 7–8); Paramount Television

Original release
- Network: ABC
- Release: January 27, 1976 – May 10, 1983

Related
- Love, American Style; Happy Days; Blansky's Beauties; Mork & Mindy; Out of the Blue; Laverne & Shirley in the Army; Joanie Loves Chachi

Laverne & Shirley is an American television sitcom that ran for eight seasons on ABC from January 27, 1976, to May 10, 1983. A spin-off of Happy Days, Laverne & Shirley stars Penny Marshall and Cindy Williams as Laverne DeFazio and Shirley Feeney, two friends and roommates who work as bottle-cappers in the fictitious Shotz Brewery in late 1950s to early 1960s Milwaukee, Wisconsin. From the sixth season onwards, the series' setting changed to mid-1960s Burbank, California.

Michael McKean and David Lander co-star as their friends and neighbors Lenny Kosnowski and Andrew "Squiggy" Squiggman, respectively; along with Eddie Mekka as Carmine Ragusa, Phil Foster as Laverne's father Frank DeFazio, and Betty Garrett as the girls' landlady Edna Babish.

Featuring regular physical comedy, Laverne & Shirley became the most-watched American television program by its third and fourth season. It received six Golden Globe nominations and one Emmy nomination.

== History ==
The series is a spin-off of Happy Days, as the two lead characters were introduced on that series as acquaintances of Fonzie (Henry Winkler). The original working title was Laverne DeFazio & Shirley Feeney. The characters were originally "two girls who date the fleet". However, for family hour, they had to be changed and mellowed down; in Cindy Williams' opinion, this change gave the show more depth. Set in roughly the same period, the timeline started in approximately 1958, when the series began, through 1967, when the series ended. As with Happy Days, it was produced by Paramount Television, created by Garry Marshall (along with Lowell Ganz and Mark Rothman) and executive produced by Garry Marshall, Edward K. Milkis, and Thomas L. Miller from Miller-Boyett Productions.

According to former Paramount president Michael Eisner, Cindy Williams had refused to do the Laverne & Shirley spin-off, (Note: Williams had portrayed key characters in George Lucas's American Graffiti (1973) (for which she had earned a BAFTA nomination as Best Supporting Actress) as well as Francis Ford Coppola's The Conversation (1974) prior to the offer for the television role.) so her role was recast with Liberty Williams (no relation), and a seven-minute screen test was filmed. Between that afternoon shoot and the evening, Cindy Williams was eventually talked into doing the role and she re-filmed the scene that night with Penny Marshall, who became her co-star in the series. Executives wanted to see both versions, but Eisner hid the first reel of film in a closet of the building and said at the screening that the film from the first shoot had gotten lost, so they only watched the performance of Cindy Williams with Penny Marshall.

== Plot ==
=== Seasons 1–5 ===
The opening credits begin with Laverne and Shirley reciting a Yiddish-American hopscotch chant from Penny Marshall’s childhood: “1, 2, 3, 4, 5, 6, 7, 8 Schlemiel! Schlimazel! Hasenpfeffer Incorporated!” The chant leads into the series' theme song, "Making Our Dreams Come True" performed by Cyndi Grecco. In the final season without Cindy Williams, the chant is recited by a group of schoolchildren.

For the first five seasons, from 1976 to 1980, the show was set in Milwaukee (executive producer Thomas L. Miller's home town), taking place from roughly 1958–59 through the early 1960s. Shotz Brewery bottle cappers and best friends, Laverne DeFazio and Shirley Feeney live in a basement apartment, where they communicate with upstairs neighbors Lenny and Squiggy by screaming up the dumbwaiter shaft connecting their apartments. Also included in the show are Laverne's father, Frank DeFazio, proprietor of the Pizza Bowl, and Edna Babish, the apartment building's landlady, who later married Frank. Shirley maintained an off-again on-again romance with dancer/singer/boxer Carmine "The Big Ragu" Ragusa. During this period, characters from Happy Days and Laverne & Shirley made occasional guest appearances on each other's series.

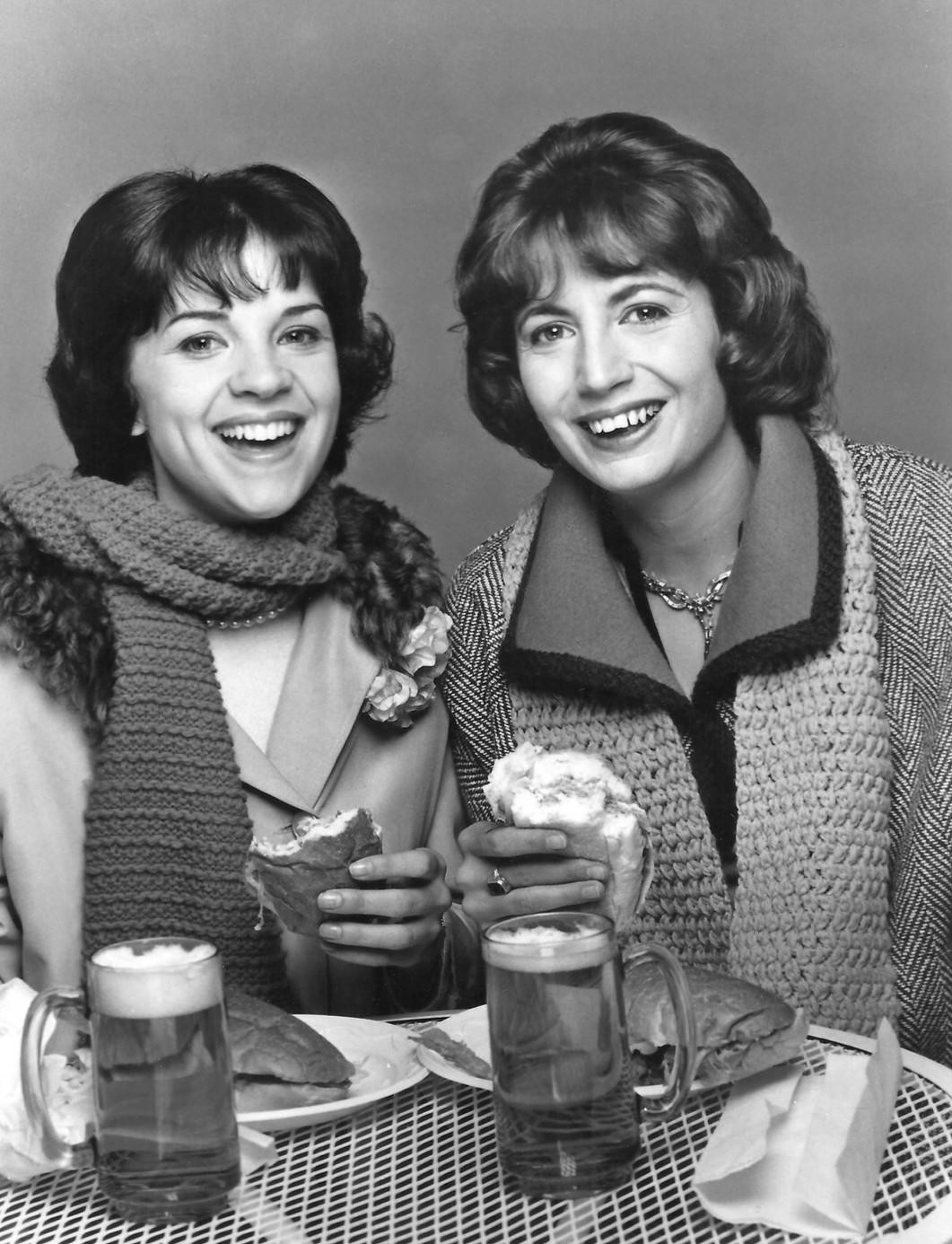
Shirley (left) and Laverne (right)

Michael McKean and David Lander created the characters of Lenny and Squiggy while both were theater students at Carnegie Mellon University in Pittsburgh, Pennsylvania. Lander told an interviewer in 2006 that they created the characters while high on marijuana. After graduating, they continued to perform the characters in live comedy routines before joining the show's cast.

During the fifth season, the girls went into the Army Reserve, and they contended with a tough-as-nails drill sergeant named Alvinia T. "The Frog" Plout (Vicki Lawrence). While their time in the Army Reserve was brief in the live action series, it did inspire an animated series with the duo in the army contending with their immediate superior, a commanding pig named Sgt. Squealy who was voiced by Ron Palillo (best known for his role as Arnold Horshack on Welcome Back, Kotter) who is always threatening to report them to Sgt. Turnbuckle (voiced by Kenneth Mars).

=== Seasons 6–8 ===
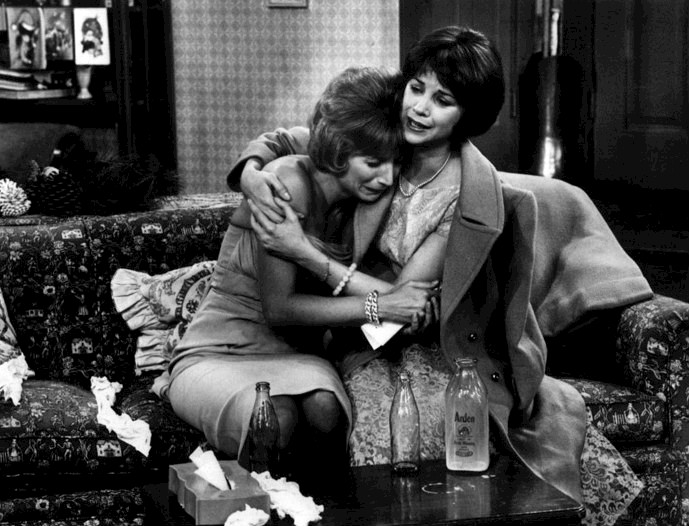
When Laverne's New Year's Eve date dumps her, an ailing Shirley comforts her.

For the sixth season in 1980, Laverne and Shirley and their friends all moved from Milwaukee to Burbank, California, after the girls lost their brewery jobs due to new automated bottlecapping machinery. Laverne and Shirley took jobs at Bardwell's department store as gift wrappers. Frank and Edna managed a Texas barbecue restaurant called Cowboy Bill's, Carmine delivered singing telegrams and sought work as an actor, and Lenny and Squiggy started a talent agency called Squignowski Talent Agency. From this point until the end of the series' run, Laverne & Shirley was set in the mid-1960s. In one of the shots in the show's new opening sequence, the ladies are seen kissing a 1964 poster of the Beatles. With each season, a new year passed in the timeline of the show, starting with 1965 in the 1980–81 season, and ending in 1967 with Carmine heading off for Broadway to star in the musical Hair. When the series' setting changed to California, two new characters are added: Sonny St. Jacques (Ed Marinaro), a stunt man, landlord of the Burbank apartment building and love interest for Laverne; as well as Rhonda Lee (Leslie Easterbrook), the ladies' neighbor and an aspiring actress.

In March 1982, Cindy Williams became pregnant with her first child. In August, two episodes into production of the series' eighth season, Williams left the show and filed a $20 million lawsuit against Paramount after they demanded Williams work on her scheduled due date. The case was later settled out of court and Williams was released from her contract.

The series' final season continued with two episodes of Williams still playing Shirley; then it was just Marshall as Laverne, who now worked for an aerospace company. With her new employment, it was explained that she was doing well financially to where she could afford to live alone. Despite the absence of Williams and her character, the series' title remained unchanged. Ratings dipped but were strong enough for the show to be considered for a ninth season. Marshall agreed based on the condition that the show would move production to New York City. Faced with the high cost of such an endeavor, ABC opted not to renew the series and it was removed from the schedule in May 1983.

== Characters ==
=== Main ===
Character	Portrayed by	Season							
Character	Portrayed by	1	2	3	4	5	6	7	8
Laverne DeFazio	Penny Marshall	Main	Main	Main	Main	Main	Main	Main	Main
Shirley Feeney	Cindy Williams	Main	Main	Main	Main	Main	Main	Main	(Note: Before her departure from the show, Cindy Williams is credited in the main title until the second episode of the eighth season, "Window on Main Street".)
Leonard "Lenny" Kosnowski	Michael McKean	Also Starring	Also Starring	Also Starring	Also Starring	Also Starring	Also Starring	Main	Recurring (Note: Michael McKean is only credited in the episodes he appears in during the eighth season.)
Andrew "Squiggy" Squiggman	David Lander	Also Starring	Also Starring	Also Starring	Also Starring	Also Starring	Also Starring	Main	Main
Carmine Ragusa	Eddie Mekka	Also Starring	Also Starring	Also Starring	Also Starring	Also Starring	Also Starring	Also Starring	Also Starring
Fabrizio "Frank" DeFazio	Phil Foster	Also Starring	Also Starring	Also Starring	Also Starring	Also Starring	Also Starring	Also Starring	Also Starring
Edna DeFazio	Betty Garrett		Also Starring	Also Starring	Also Starring	Also Starring	Also Starring		
Rhonda Lee	Leslie Easterbrook						Also Starring	Also Starring	Also Starring
Sonny St. Jacques	Ed Marinaro						Also Starring		

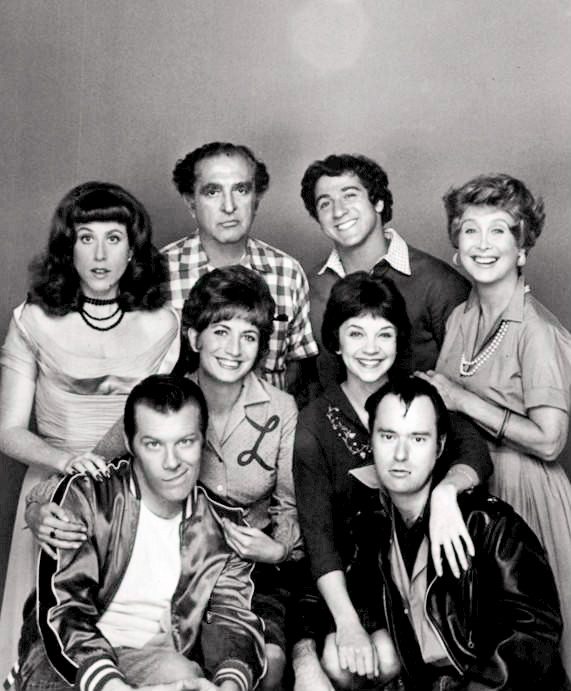
Cast photo, 1976. Standing, L–R: Carole Ita White, Phil Foster, Eddie Mekka, Betty Garrett. Middle row, standing: Penny Marshall, Cindy Williams. Seated: Michael McKean, David Lander.

- Laverne Marie DeFazio (Penny Marshall) is known for being a tough-talking tomboy. She grew up in Brooklyn, with her Italian immigrant parents. Laverne's parents moved to Milwaukee, where her mother died. Laverne works alongside best friend and roommate Shirley. Milk and Pepsi is Laverne's favorite drink. Her trademark is the script letter "L" monogrammed on her shirts and sweaters, an idea Marshall got from seeing a vintage sweater in the wardrobe department with an initial sewn in the upper left corner, something that would help the audience remember that she is Laverne. She is the only character to appear in all 178 episodes of the series.
- In the first episode of Mork & Mindy (September 14, 1978), in a flash back to untold/new events from the time of Happy Days, Fonzi and Laverne are friends, who share several passionate kisses, so they are friends with benefits.
- Shirley Wilhelmina Feeney (Cindy Williams) is the perky, positive one. She also tends to be meek, while Laverne is more outspoken. She later becomes a huge fan of teen-idol Fabian. Her overbearing mother Lily (Pat Carroll) expects more from Shirley than she can give. Shirley is sensitive and tends to overreact. When she tries to hold back a laugh, she bites her knuckle on her index finger. Shirley works at Shotz brewery with Laverne. She has a special relationship with her stuffed cat, Boo Boo Kitty, a name Williams gave the toy after forgetting a line in rehearsal, and was the name of her mother's cat.
- Leonard "Lenny" Kosnowski (Michael McKean) is a lovable goofball greaser who pesters Laverne and Shirley, along with his best friend and roommate Squiggy, both of whom live upstairs from Laverne and Shirley's lower-level apartment. Lenny works as a truck driver at the Shotz brewery. Lenny says that, while he is not completely sure, he thinks his last name is Polish for "Help, there's a hog in my kitchen". McKean's role was shortened in the eighth season due to his filming This Is Spinal Tap. He appeared in only five episodes, credited as a guest star. As of 2025, McKean is the only surviving original cast member.
- Andrew "Squiggy" Squiggman (David Lander) works and lives with childhood friend Lenny. Squiggy, who is a greaser like Lenny, makes nearly every entrance (as a running gag, they usually enter just as Laverne and/or Shirley are describing something unpleasant) with his trademark "Hello" said in a comically dopey voice. In the final season, Squiggy's lookalike sister Squendoline is introduced. Originally created by Lander and McKean as Anthony Squiggliano, the character's name was changed to German because the producers believed there were already too many Italians in the show.
- Carmine Ragusa (Eddie Mekka) is Shirley's high-school sweetheart and on-again, off-again romance. "The Big Ragu" is a part-time boxer and former Golden Gloves champion who owns a dance studio and is constantly working to make it big as a dancer and singer. In the final episode of the series, he auditions for the musical Hair, at last landing a major role on Broadway.
- Fabrizio "Frank" DeFazio (Phil Foster) is Laverne's father who runs the Pizza Bowl, a local hang out. In season six, he opens up Cowboy Bill's in Burbank, California. Although he can be harsh and lose his temper sometimes, he has a heart of gold. He loves Laverne very much, having been her only parent for years. His pet name for his daughter is "Muffin". Frank is also protective of Shirley, becoming somewhat of a surrogate father to her since her family was far away.
- Edna Babish DeFazio (Betty Garrett, seasons 2–6) is the five-time-divorced landlady who eventually marries Laverne's father. In season 2, she was dressed quite plainly, and Garrett's then-long hair was put under a more conservative wig, but in the third season, a new wardrobe worker suggested that she should be more "jazzy", with her real hair and colorful costumes, and this change fleshed out the character. Edna occasionally sings and dances in the local brewery talent shows. When the series was extended beyond the intended final season, Garrett had already committed to another project necessitating Edna be written out as having left Frank.
- Rhonda Lee (Leslie Easterbrook, seasons 6–8) is a tall, voluptuous, somewhat ditzy blonde actress/singer/dancer/model trying to get discovered and make it big in Hollywood. She is Laverne and Shirley's neighbor and a regular character after they move to Burbank. Rhonda, who also comes off as rather narcissistic about her good looks and self-obsessed, always refers to herself in the third person, by her first name. Rhonda often bursts into Laverne and Shirley's apartment (occasionally at inopportune times, much like Lenny and Squiggy often do) to borrow things without really asking and to brag about her social engagements or romantic dates with desirable men with the intention of making the girls envious.
- Sonny St. Jacques (Ed Marinaro, season 6) is a stuntman and Laverne and Shirley's landlord in Burbank. A tall, handsome, muscular man, Sonny is often seen with his shirt off or open. He was intended as a love interest for Laverne. After several episodes in Burbank, Sonny was written out of the show and rarely, if ever, mentioned again. (In reality, Marinaro left the series to star in Hill Street Blues.)

=== Recurring ===
- (Big) Rosie Greenbaum (Carole Ita White) is Laverne and Shirley's childhood nemesis. She married a rich doctor and rubs this in the ladies' faces, though they make fun of the fact that he is a proctologist. She is Laverne's rival and upsets her by calling her a "bimbo". Big Rosie and fellow Milwaukee classmate Terri Buttefuco both return in the season-seven episode "Class of '56".
- Terri Buttefuco (Judy Pioli) is a former classmate of Laverne and Shirley. She is tough and athletic and has a better relationship with Laverne and Shirley than they do with Rosie Greenbaum. Pioli also wrote and acted as a script consultant for the series.
- Sgt. Alvinia T. Plout (Vicki Lawrence) is a tough-as-nails drill sergeant Laverne and Shirley met when they went into the Army, who's known on the base as "The Frog". She returns in Season 6 having gone AWOL from the Army after falling in love with a four-star general who jilted her.
- Officer Norman Hughes (Bo Kaprall) is a police officer and love interest for Laverne.
- Mr. Hildebrand (Norman Bartold) is Laverne and Shirley's boss at Bardwell's Department Store.
- Mrs. Kolchek (Rose Mitchum) is a neighbor living in Laverne and Shirley's Milwaukee apartment building and appeared in 5 episodes from 1977 to 1980. She rarely has speaking roles, but when she does speak, she only speaks to Laverne, as she is annoyed at Shirley for always yelling at her because Shirley thinks she is very hard of hearing, which she isn't, and because she is also interested in Carmine in spite of their age differences.
- Chuck (Charles Fleischer) is Laverne's co-worker in season 8.

== Episodes ==
Season	Episodes	Originally released		Rank	Rating
Season	Episodes	First released	Last released	Rank	Rating
1	15	January 27, 1976	May 18, 1976	3	27.5
2	23	September 28, 1976	April 5, 1977	2	30.9
3	24	September 20, 1977	May 30, 1978	1	31.6
4	24	September 5, 1978	May 15, 1979	1	30.5
5	26	September 13, 1979	May 13, 1980	42	—N/a
6	22	November 18, 1980	May 26, 1981	20 (Note: Tied with Monday Night Football.)	20.6
7	22	October 13, 1981	May 11, 1982	20	19.9
8	22	September 28, 1982	May 10, 1983	25	17.8

== Broadcast history and ratings ==
Laverne & Shirley debuted in the 1975–76 TV season, with its first episode airing in January 1976, in the Tuesday night time slot after Happy Days. By its third season, it had become the most-watched American television program according to Nielsen ratings. In August 1979, before the start of its fifth season, Laverne & Shirley was moved to Thursdays at 8 pm opposite The Waltons on CBS and Buck Rogers in the 25th Century on NBC. By the end of the fifth season, ratings fell sharply and the sitcom failed to make the list of the top 30 programs. In an effort to improve the show's ratings, ABC moved Laverne & Shirley to Mondays at 8 p.m. in December 1979. The ratings fared no better, so in February 1980 the network moved the series back to its familiar Tuesday-night berth, where it remained for the next three years. Between 1980 and 1982, the ratings improved considerably, but, despite having regained its original time slot and changing its format, Laverne & Shirley never regained the popularity it had attained during its first four years on the air, and during its final season struggled against The A-Team on NBC. By the time of its cancellation in 1983, the series ranked at number 25 for the season. The show aired in reruns on ABC daytime from April 1979 to June 1980.

In 2010, the show would air reruns on The Hub, now known as Discovery Family, until 2014. The show is currently available via Paramount’s free streaming offering, Pluto TV, and is the only legal way to view the show in the United States.

== Animated spin-off ==
During the run of the main show, an animated spin-off also called Laverne & Shirley began airing on Saturday mornings. The first program was aired on October 10, 1981, and features the voices of Marshall and Williams playing Laverne and Shirley in the Army with a talking pig drill sergeant named "Squealy" (voiced by Ron Palillo). The show was retitled Laverne & Shirley with Special Guest Star The Fonz when the Fonz began working in the motorpool as the chief mechanic, and then again retitled Mork & Mindy/Laverne & Shirley/Fonz Hour when new segments involving a teenaged Mork & Mindy were added to the mix. The series ran until September 3, 1983.

== Merchandise ==
The program was so successful at the time that it spawned a merchandise franchise. Mego released two models of Laverne and Shirley dolls, and one model of Lenny and Squiggy dolls. Matchbox created a Shotz Brewery delivery van, and several novelty toys were sold such as Halloween costumes, a board game, jigsaw puzzles, coloring books, video slot machine and other toys.

== Home media ==
Paramount Home Entertainment and (starting with season 2) CBS DVD have released the entire series of Laverne and Shirley on DVD in Region 1, albeit with music substitutions and scene deletions.

On June 16, 2015, CBS DVD released Laverne & Shirley – The Complete Series on DVD in Region 1.

Season 1 has also been released on DVD in Region 2.

The first three seasons have been released on DVD in Region 4 by Paramount.

DVD name	No. of episodes	Release dates		
DVD name	No. of episodes	Region 1	Region 2	Region 4
The Complete First Season	15	August 17, 2004	April 7, 2008	August 25, 2020
The Complete Second Season	23	April 17, 2007	TBA	September 4, 2008
The Complete Third Season	24	November 27, 2007	TBA	February 5, 2009
The Complete Fourth Season	24	April 22, 2008	TBA	TBA
The Complete Fifth Season	26	April 10, 2012	TBA	TBA
The Complete Sixth Season	22	May 21, 2013	TBA	TBA
The Complete Seventh Season	22	February 4, 2014	TBA	TBA
The Complete Eighth and Final Season	22	May 6, 2014	TBA	TBA
The Complete Series	178	June 16, 2015	TBA	TBA

Laverne & Shirley Sing (1976) cover

Lenny and the Squigtones (1979) cover

=== Music ===
The theme song from the series ("Making Our Dreams Come True" as performed by Cyndi Grecco) was released as a single from Cyndi's LP by the same name and became a radio favorite, becoming a top-30 American hit in 1976.

In 1976, Penny Marshall and Cindy Williams released an album, performed in character, titled Laverne & Shirley Sing, which contained some original songs along with some 1950s and 1960s standards. The album was originally released on Atlantic Records. On November 11, 2003, Collector's Choice released it on CD. The single "Sixteen Reasons" reached #72 in Canada.

In 1979, Michael McKean and David Lander followed suit with the album Lenny and the Squigtones, also performed in character, featuring original songs (and some spoken material) penned by McKean and Lander. Several new characters were introduced on this album as band members, including future Spinal Tap character Nigel Tufnel, portrayed by Christopher Guest. The album was released on Casablanca Records.

In July 1979, McKean and Lander also appeared together (in character) on American Bandstand performing the song "King of the Cars", the single released from their Lenny and the Squigtones album. They also performed "Love Is a Terrible Thing", another song from the album.

In 1980, Romina Power (of Al Bano and Romina Power fame) recorded a separate theme tune for the show when it was introduced to the Italian market. The track, simply titled "Laverne & Shirley", featured verses in English and Italian. Released as a single in the same year, the track failed to chart.
