= Roger Garrett (actor) =

American actor (1940–2000)

- Roger Garrett in Bewitched 1966
- Born: July 16, 1940
- Died: May 23, 2000 (aged 59)
- Occupation: Actor

Roger Garrett (1940–2000) was an American actor. He acted on stage and played supporting roles in television series and films. He had a starring role in the West Coast production of Fortune and Men's Eyes (1969) and a starring role in the horror/thriller motion picture Night of the Cobra Woman (1972).

Some of the big name performers that Garrett appeared opposite are Elizabeth Montgomery, Barbara Eden, Larry Hagman, Don Johnson, Jacqueline Bisset, Tuesday Weld, and Jack Nicholson.

== Acting career ==
Garrett first appeared on television as Clyde Farnsworth, who had turned himself into a chair because Samantha rejected him, in a 1966 episode of Bewitched. That was followed with an episode of I Dream of Jeannie.

He toured with a stage production of The Impossible Years in 1968, and was then cast by director Sal Mineo to star in the role as Mona in the West Coast premiere of the controversial gay-themed prison drama Fortune and Men's Eyes by playwright John Herbert. The show was set to open on January 9, 1969, at the Coronet Theatre on North La Cienega Boulevard. An article with stage news in the Los Angeles Times of Sunday, January 5, 1969, reads:

"Sal Mineo, now directing his first play, took the cast of John Herbert's "Fortune and Men's Eyes" which opens Thursday night at the Coronet Theater, to Chino Prison for a first hand rehearsal. The leads—Roger Garrett, Michael Greer, Don Johnson and James Oliver—were booked into the prison for the weekend. The idea was to see what prison atmosphere was really like."

On a website about Mineo, it says, in reference to Fortune and Men's Eyes, "The other character in the cell is Jan, or Mona, as he is called. He is a defenceless little bookworm who was persecuted by some toughs who said he made a pass so he is in the place for several months (this REALLY "cures" people of their demons, doesn't it?). It is Mona who watches Smitty's mind and spirit be turned to the "dark side" of its day. Roger Garrett was the actor who played this role. He was excellent and left a couple of months into the run to do a film—The Grasshopper, with Jacqueline Bissett and Jim Brown. Roger plays her hairdresser/confidante."

Garrett appeared in three theatrical motion pictures, playing the role as Buck Brown in the drama/romance The Grasshopper (1970) starring Jacqueline Bisset, Jim Brown, and Joseph Cotten; the role as Noah's friend in the drama A Safe Place (1971) starring Tuesday Weld, Orson Welles, and Jack Nicholson; and the role as Stan Duff opposite Joy Bang and Marlene Clark in the horror/thriller Night of the Cobra Woman (1972).

He made guest appearances on other popular TV shows, including Adam-12, The Interns, and Laverne & Shirley.

== Filmography ==
=== Film ===
Year	Title	Role	Genre	Notes
1970	The Grasshopper	Buck Brown	Drama / Romance	
1971	A Safe Place	Noah's Friend #3	Drama	
1972	Night of the Cobra Woman	Stan Duff	Horror / Thriller	

=== TV series ===
Year	Title	Role	Episode	Notes
1966	Bewitched	Clyde Farnsworth	Sam's Spooky Chair	
1968	I Dream of Jeannie	Joe	Indispensable Jeannie	
1969	Adam-12	Larry Harris	Log 102: We Can't Just Walk Away from It	
1970	The Interns	C.P.	Act of God	
1973	Circle of Fear	Royal Warlock	Graveyard Shift	
1976	Laverne & Shirley	Pulper	Oh Hear the Angels' Voices	(final appearance)
