= Cindy Williams =

American actress (1947–2023)

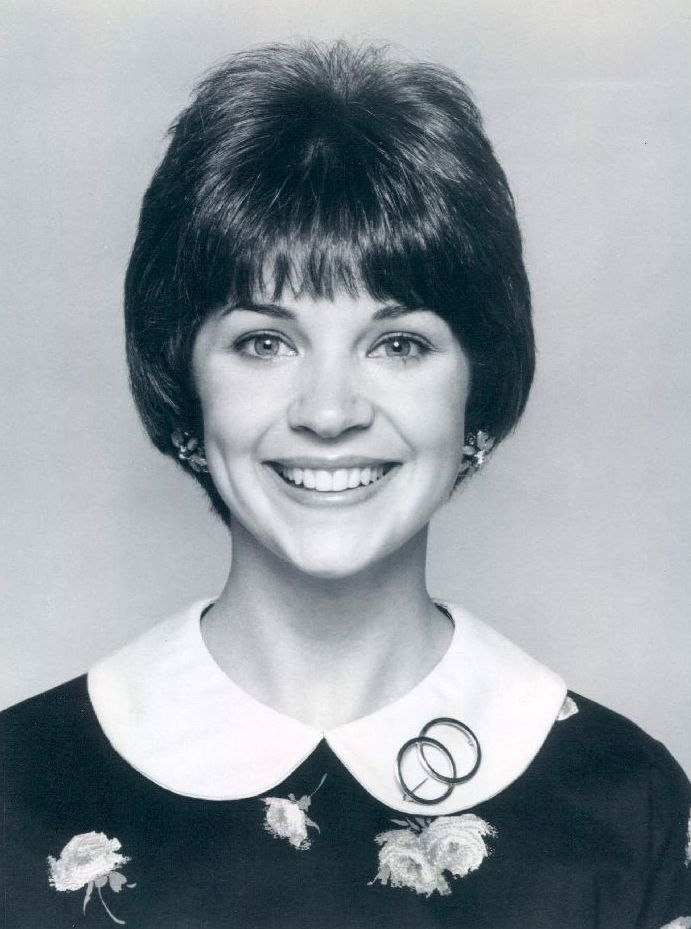
- Williams as Shirley Feeney in 1976
- Born: Cynthia Jane Williams; August 22, 1947; Los Angeles, California, US
- Died: January 25, 2023 (aged 75); Los Angeles, California, US
- Resting place: Forest Lawn Memorial Park, Hollywood Hills, California
- Occupations: Actor; producer; memoirist
- Years active: 1970–2023
- Known for: Laverne & Shirley; Happy Days; American Graffiti; Getting By
- Spouse: Bill Hudson (m. 1982; div. 2000)
- Children: 2

Cynthia Jane Williams (August 22, 1947 – January 25, 2023) was an American actress. She is best known for her role as Shirley Feeney on the television sitcoms Happy Days (1975–1979), and Laverne & Shirley (1976–1982). She also appeared in American Graffiti (1973), The Conversation (1974), Mr. Ricco (1975), and More American Graffiti (1979).

== Early life ==
Williams was born in Van Nuys, Los Angeles on August 22, 1947. Her mother, Cindy, was a waitress and her father, Beachard "Bill" Williams, worked at an electronics manufacturing company. The family moved to Dallas when she was a year old and returned to Los Angeles when she was ten years old. She had a sister named Carol Ann.

Williams wrote and acted at a church during childhood and later acted in productions at Birmingham High School; she graduated in 1965, a year behind Sally Field. She attended Los Angeles City College where she majored in theater.

== Career ==
After college, Williams began her professional career by landing national commercials, which included Foster Grant sunglasses and TWA. Her first roles in television, among others, were on Room 222, Nanny and the Professor, and Love, American Style.

Williams accompanied an actor-friend from Los Angeles City College who needed a scene partner for the audition and was also accepted at The Actors Studio West, but rarely attended due to acting commitments. Williams picked up important film roles early in her career: George Cukor's Travels with My Aunt (1972); as Laurie Henderson, Ron Howard's character's high school sweetheart in George Lucas's American Graffiti (1973) for which she earned a BAFTA nomination as Best Supporting Actress; and Francis Ford Coppola's The Conversation (1974). She auditioned along with thousands of others, for Lucas's Star Wars for the role of Princess Leia, but Leia was ultimately played by Carrie Fisher because Lucas wished to cast unknowns, as in American Graffiti.

Williams met Penny Marshall, first on a double date, and later at Francis Ford Coppola's Zoetrope company. The company hired them as comedy writers, because "they wanted two women" on a prospective TV spoof for the Bicentennial. While the two were writing for Zoetrope, Penny Marshall's brother, Garry Marshall, called to ask if they would like to make an appearance on an episode of Happy Days, a television series he produced.

In 1975, Williams was cast as a fun-loving brewery bottle capper, Shirley Feeney, in an episode of Happy Days with Penny who played her best friend and roommate Laverne De Fazio. The girls were cast as "sure-thing" dates of Richie and Fonzie (Henry Winkler). Their appearance proved so popular that Garry Marshall commissioned a spin-off series for the characters of Shirley and Laverne. Williams continued her role on the very successful Laverne & Shirley series from 1976 until 1982. At one point during its run, the series was the number one rated show on television. Williams was praised for her portrayal of Shirley Feeney. She left the show after the second episode of the show's eighth and what would become its final season, after she became pregnant with her first child. The show's various producers were not enthusiastic that Williams was pregnant. Williams and co-star Penny Marshall had also been feuding for quite some time on the set long before Williams became pregnant. (They would reconcile many years later.) The success of the TV series led to a short-lived Saturday morning animated series Laverne & Shirley in the Army (1981–82), created by Hanna-Barbera.

In 1979, she reprised her role of Laurie from American Graffiti in its sequel, More American Graffiti.

In 1985, Williams starred in the ABC sitcom pilot Joanna, which aired as a special on April 30 of that year. The premise involved Williams's character, Joanna, following her boyfriend from Los Angeles to New York, though he leaves her for another woman. Joanna then decides to stay in New York, becoming the operations manager of a trucking company. The pilot was not picked up as a series. That same year, Williams starred in the sci-fi comedy UFOria alongside Fred Ward and Harry Dean Stanton, a movie which was already completed in 1981.

In 1990, Williams starred in an unsold pilot for CBS that was adapted from the 1989 film Steel Magnolias. Williams was cast as M'Lynn Eatenton, the role that was played by Sally Field in the film. Also in 1990, Williams returned to series TV in the short-lived sitcom Normal Life and, a couple of years later, reunited with former Laverne & Shirley producers Thomas L. Miller and Robert L. Boyett to star in their family sitcom Getting By (1993–94). She guest-starred on several television shows, including two episodes of 8 Simple Rules.

Williams performed onstage in the national tours of Grease, Deathtrap, and Moon Over Buffalo as well as a regional production of Nunsense. She reunited with her Laverne & Shirley co-star Eddie Mekka in a November 2008 regional production of the Renée Taylor-Joseph Bologna comedy play It Had to Be You.

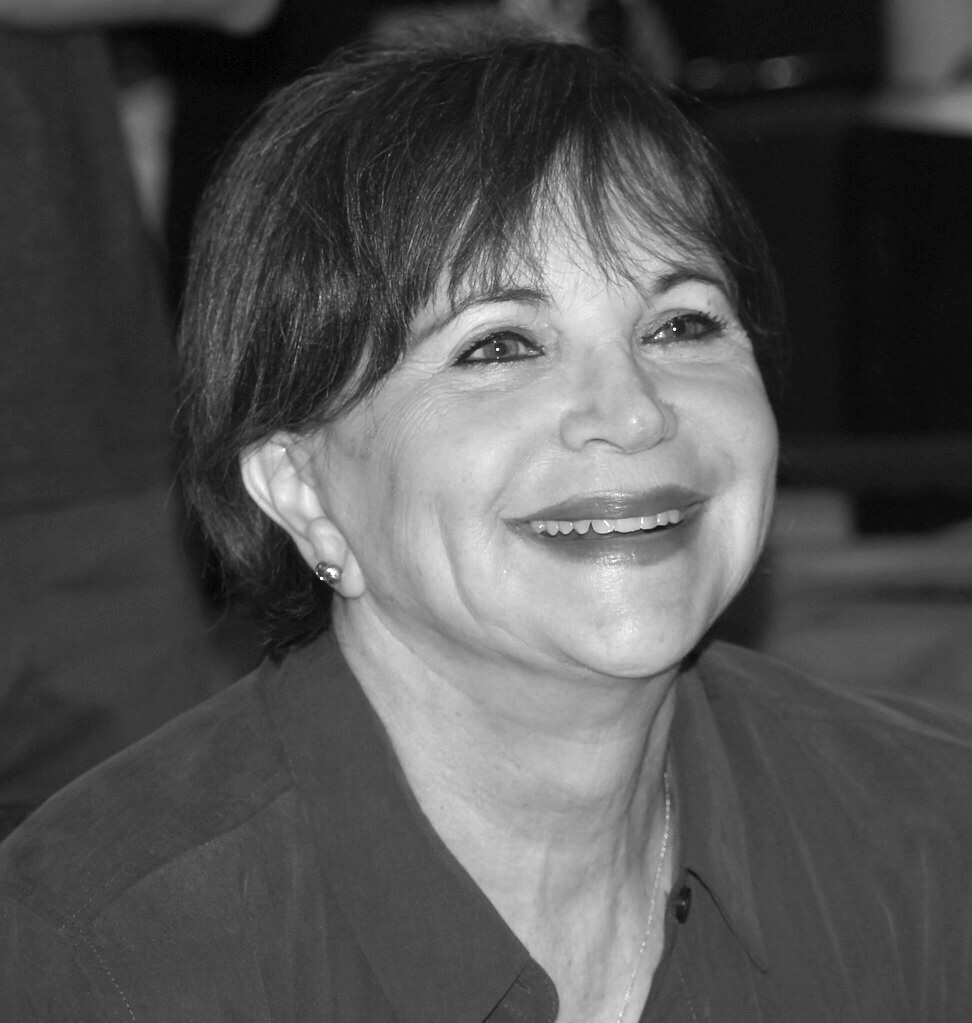
Williams in 2017

She made her Broadway debut as daffy Mrs. Tottendale in The Drowsy Chaperone at the Marquis Theatre on December 11, 2007, succeeding Jo Anne Worley in the role which was first played on Broadway by Georgia Engel.

Williams reunited with Penny Marshall on the TV series Sam & Cat in the episode "#SalmonCat" (2013). In 2015, her memoir Shirley, I Jest! (co-written with Dave Smitherman) was published. In the same year, Williams engaged in celebrity branding for the home care service Visiting Angels.

== Personal life ==
Williams married Bill Hudson of the musical trio The Hudson Brothers in 1982. They had two children (Zak and Emily Hudson) before divorcing in 2000.

Williams was a Roman Catholic.

== Death ==
Williams died in Los Angeles on January 25, 2023, at age 75, following a brief illness.

== Filmography ==
=== Film ===
List of Cindy Williams film credits
Year	Title	Role	Notes
1970	Gas-s-s-s	Marissa	
1971	Drive, He Said	Manager's Girlfriend	
1972	Beware! The Blob	Randy's Girl	
1972	Travels with My Aunt	Tooley	
1973	The Killing Kind	Lori Davis	
1973	American Graffiti	Laurie Henderson	Nominated—BAFTA Award for Best Actress in a Supporting Role
1974	The Conversation	Ann	
1975	Mr. Ricco	Jamison	
1976	The First Nudie Musical	Rosie	
1979	More American Graffiti	Laurie Henderson Bolander	
1981	The Creature Wasn't Nice also known as Naked Space	Annie McHugh	
1985	UFOria	Arlene Stewart	
1985	The Joy of Natural Childbirth	Herself	
1989	Big Man on Campus	Diane Girard	
1989	Rude Awakening	June Margolin	
1991	Bingo	Natalie Devlin	
1997	Meet Wally Sparks	Emily Preston	
2002	The Biggest Fan	Debbie's Mom	
2006	The Legend of William Tell	Jillian	
2012	Stealing Roses	Rose	Also associate producer
2018	Waiting in the Wings: Still Waiting	Rosie	
2020	Canaan Land	Talk Show Guest	

=== Television ===
List of Cindy Williams television credits
Year	Title	Role	Notes
1969–1971	Room 222	Rhoda Zagor / Rita Zagor	3 episodes
1970	My World and Welcome to It	Lydia No. 2	Episode: "Child's Play"
1970	Barefoot in the Park	Agnes	Episode: "The Marriage Proposal"
1971	Nanny and the Professor	2nd Coed	Episode: "The Art of Relationships"
1971	The Funny Side	Teenage Wife	6 episodes
1971	Getting Together	Cathy	Episode: "Cathy's Clown"
1973	Love, American Style	Karen Brown / Naomi Brubaker	2 episodes
1974	Hawaii Five-O	Sue Reynolds	Episode: "Secret Witness"
1974	The Migrants	Betty	Television film
1974	Cannon	June Bowers	Episode: "The Stalker"
1975	Insight	Flora	Episode: "Somewhere Before"
1975	Police Story	Joanna	Episode: "Test of Brotherhood"
1975–1979	Happy Days	Shirley Feeney	5 episodes
1976	Petrocelli	Carol Janssen	Episode: "Survival"
1976–1982	Laverne & Shirley	Shirley Feeney	159 episodes Nominated—Golden Globe Award for Best Actress – Television Series Musical or Comedy (1978)
1977	Saturday Night Live	Velocity / Self	Episode: "Live from Mardi Gras"
1978	Suddenly, Love	Regina Malloy	Television film
1979–1980	CHiPs	Cindy Williams	2 episodes
1981–1982	Laverne & Shirley in the Army	Shirley Feeney (voice)	13 episodes
1982	Mork & Mindy/Laverne & Shirley/Fonz Hour	Shirley Feeney (voice)	Episode: "The Speed Demon Get-Away Caper"
1985	When Dreams Come True	Susan Matthews	Television film
1985	Joanna	Joanna Weston	Television film
1986	Help Wanted: Kids	Lisa Burke	Television film
1986	The Leftovers	Heather Drew	Television film
1988	Save the Dog!	Becky	Television film
1988	Tricks of the Trade	Catherine	Television film
1990	Perry Mason: The Case of the Poisoned Pen	Rita Sue Bliss	Television film
1990	Normal Life	Anne Harlow	13 episodes
1990	Steel Magnolias	M'Lynn Eatenton	Television film
1990	Menu for Murder	Connie Mann	Television film
1991	Earth Angel	Judith	Television film
1993–1994	Getting By	Cathy Hale	31 episodes
1994	Lois & Clark: The New Adventures of Superman	Wandamae	Episode: "A Bolt from the Blue"
1995	Escape from Terror: The Teresa Stamper Story	Wanda Walden	Television film
1995	The Laverne & Shirley Reunion	Herself	Television special
1995	The Magic School Bus	Gerri Poveri (voice)	Episode: "Ups and Downs"
1996	Touched by an Angel	Claire	Episode: "Jacob's Ladder"
1996	The Stepford Husbands	Caroline Knox	Television film
1996	Hope & Gloria	Connie Carlucci	Episode: "Come Back Lil' Tina"
1999	The Patty Duke Show: Still Rockin' in Brooklyn Heights	Sue Ellen Caldwell	Television film
2000–2001	Strip Mall	Herself	6 episodes
2000–2002	For Your Love	Ronnie	3 episodes
2001	Son of the Beach	Bobbi	Episode: "Grand Prix"
2001	The Brothers García	Mrs. Barbacoa	Episode: "The Student Buddy"
2001	The Weakest Link	Herself	Classic TV Stars Edition No. 2
2002	Laverne & Shirley: Together Again	Herself / Shirley Feeney	Television special
2002	7th Heaven	Vice Principal Val	Episode: "The Enemy Within"
2002	Less than Perfect	Joan Casey	Episode: "Meet the Folks"
2003	8 Simple Rules	Mary Ellen Doyle	2 episodes
2004	Law & Order: Special Victims Unit	Nora Hodges	Episode: "Sick"
2004–2005	Girlfriends	Lisa James	2 episodes
2007	Drive	House Mother	3 episodes
2012	Strawberry Summer	Ruth Yates	Television film
2012	Are We There Yet?	Erin	Episode: "The Thanksgiving Episode"
2013	Sam & Cat	Janice Dobbins	Episode: "#SalmonCat"
2016	The Odd Couple	Vivian	Episode: "Taffy Days"
2016	A Dream of Christmas	Jayne 'The Angel'	Television film

=== Stage ===
Year	Title	Role	Notes
1997	Moon Over Buffalo	Charlotte Hay	Stage West Calgary
2007	The Drowsy Chaperone	Mrs. Tottendale (Replacement)	Marquis Theatre, Broadway
2009	Kong's Night Out	Sally Charmaine	Meadow Brook Theatre
2011	The Odd Couple	Olive Madison	Surflight Theatre
2012	Nunset Boulevard	Mother Superior	National Tour
2013	Weekend Comedy	Peggy	New Theatre Restaurant
2015	Meshuggah-Nuns!	Rev. Mother Mary Regina	Meadow Brook Theatre
2017	Mom's Gift	Peggy Swenson	Meadow Brook Theatre
2019	Middletown	Dotty Abrams	Bucks County Playhouse
2019	Thoroughly Modern Millie	Mrs. Meers	Huron Country Playhouse
2019	Menopause The Musical	Hostess	Ogunquit Playhouse
2020	Church Basement Ladies	Karin Engleson	New Theatre Restaurant
2022	Me, Myself & Shirley	Herself	National Tour
