= Eddie Mekka =

American actor (1952–2021)

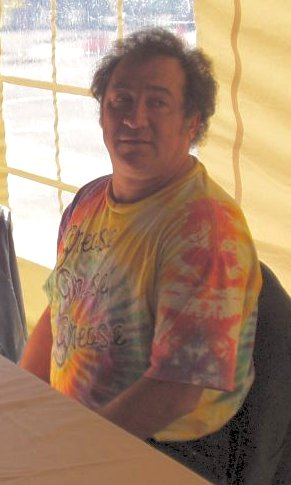
- Mekka in 2005
- Born: Edward Rudolph Mekjian; June 14, 1952; Worcester, Massachusetts, U.S.
- Died: November 27, 2021 (aged 69); Newhall, Santa Clarita, California, U.S.
- Occupation: Actor
- Years active: 1974–2018
- Spouses: DeLee Lively (m. 1983; div. 1992) Yvonne Marie Grace (m. 1994)
- Children: 1

Edward Rudolph Mekjian (June 14, 1952 – November 27, 2021), known professionally as Eddie Mekka, was an American actor, best known for his role as Carmine Ragusa on the hit television sitcom Laverne & Shirley.

== Early life ==
Mekka was born in Worcester, Massachusetts, the son of Mariam (née Apkarian), a dry cleaning presser, and Vahe Vaughn Mekjian, a factory worker. His family was of Armenian descent. His father was a World War II veteran. He graduated from Burncoat High School and attended the Berklee College of Music.

== Career ==
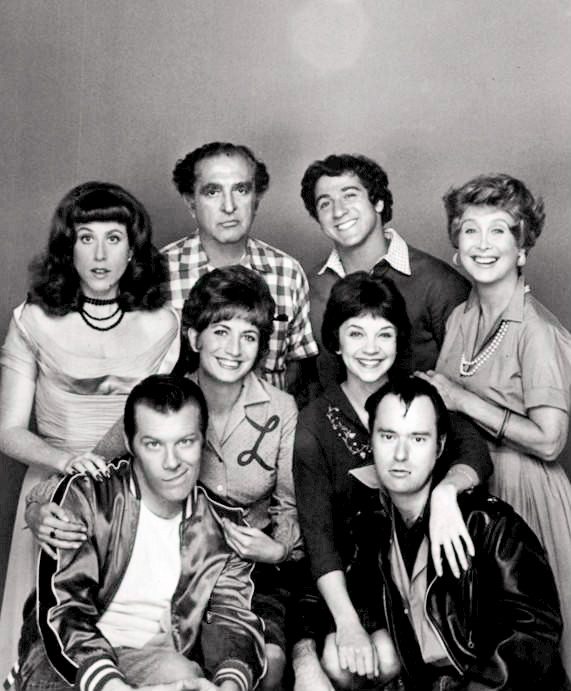
Cast photo of Laverne & Shirley (1976). Standing, L-R: Carole Ita White, Phil Foster, Mekka, Betty Garrett. Middle row, standing: Penny Marshall, Cindy Williams. Seated: Michael McKean, David Lander.

In the early 1970s, Mekka headed the Worcester County Light Opera in Massachusetts, teaching young people how to sing. After performing on Broadway in The Lieutenant, for which he was nominated for a Tony Award, he moved to Los Angeles. He landed the role of Carmine "The Big Ragu" Ragusa for Laverne & Shirley in 1976, acting on the series until its 1983 cancellation.

Mekka starred in roughly 50 TV shows and movies throughout his career. His television credits included 24, The Suite Life of Zack & Cody, It's Always Sunny in Philadelphia, The Bold and the Beautiful, and as Detective Murdoch in the Fox television movie Catch Me If You Can. He had a small role in the Penny Marshall-directed 1992 film, A League of Their Own as the dance partner of Mae (Madonna) in the bar.

Onstage, he performed in Hairspray at the Luxor in Las Vegas, Nevada, and in a national tour of Grease with Cindy Williams. Mekka returned to off-Broadway theatre on July 15, 2008, starring in Steve Solomon's long-running comedy My Mother's Italian, My Father's Jewish & I'm In Therapy! at the Westside Theatre.

Mekka had regular solo singing performances for many years from the 1990s into the 2000s throughout the Naples and the Fort Lauderdale, Florida areas.

Mekka reunited with his Laverne & Shirley co-star Cindy Williams in a November 2008 regional production of the Renée Taylor-Joseph Bologna comedy play It Had to Be You.

In 2008, Mekka wrapped production in the independent film Code Enforcer. He starred opposite Erin Moran of Happy Days.

In 2010, Mekka starred as Tevye in Fiddler on the Roof at the John W. Engeman Theater in Northport, New York, from April 29 until June 20.

== Personal life ==
Mekka was married to actress DeLee Lively from 1983 to 1992. He married Yvonne Marie Grace in 1994. Together they had one daughter, Mia.

Mekka died in Newhall, Santa Clarita, California, on November 27, 2021, at the age of 69.

== Filmography ==
=== Film ===
Year	Title	Role	Notes
1982	Assignment Berlin	Soghomon Tehlirian	
1988	Bum Rap	Sammy	
1989	Beaches	Actor 3	
1992	A League of Their Own	Mae's Guy in Bar	
1997	Top of the World	Joe Burns	
2003	Dickie Roberts: Former Child Star	Himself	Cameo
2004	Land of the Free?	Jerry	
2006	The Last Stand	Art	
2006	Dreamgirls	Club Manager	
2006	Love Made Easy	Mobo	
2007	Stuck in the Past	Grandpa	
2008	Dirty Jokes the Movie		Direct-to-video
2009	C Me Dance	Lowell	
2013	Through a Mother's Eyes	Dr. Henry Myer	
2014	Heaven Help Us	Chuck	Short film
2017	Diary of a Lunatic	Mr. Karnofsky	
2017	Silver Twins	Rabbi	
2017	Surge of Power: Revenge of the Sequel	Himself	
2018	Hail Mary!	Danny Morelli	Final role

=== Television ===
Year	Title	Role	Notes
1976–1983	Laverne & Shirley	Carmine Ragusa	150 episodes
1977	Blansky's Beauties	Joey DeLuca	13 episodes
1977–1979	Happy Days	Carmine Ragusa	2 episodes
1979	Greatest Heroes of the Bible	Uri	Episode: "The Story of Esther"
1979–1982	The Love Boat	Bert Brodie / Jason Clark / Stanley Corson / Mike	3 episodes
1979–1983	Fantasy Island	Charles / Ken Jason / Johnny Detroit / Wilbur Wilson	3 episodes
1981	The 6th Annual Circus of the Stars	Himself (performer)	Television special
1982	The 7th Annual Circus of the Stars	Himself (performer)	Television special
1989	Moonlighting	Guido Viola	Episode: "In 'N Outlaws"
1989	True Blue	Elvis fanatic	Episode: "Oldies, But Goodies"
1990	Mulberry Street	Vincent Savoia	Television pilot
1990	The Munsters Today	Mr. Sweetzer	Episode: "The Reel Munsters"
1990–1994	Family Matters	Mr. Nutting / Charlie	2 episodes
1992–1993	Guiding Light	Grady	Unknown episodes
1993	Taking the Heat	Barbaro	Television film
1994	The Rockford Files: I Still Love L.A.	Gus	Television film
1994	California Dreams	Uncle Frank	Episode: "Harley and the Marlboro Man"
1995	Dream On	Mel	Episode: "Significant Author"
1995	The Laverne & Shirley Reunion	Himself	Television special
1996	Weird Science	Tommy Svachino	Episode: "Men in Tights"
1997	The Big Easy	Joey LaVern	Episode: "Heavenly Body"
1998	The Jamie Foxx Show	Danny	Episode: "It's All Good, Fellas"
1998	Sunset Beach	Summons Process Server	2 episodes
1998	Deadly Game	Det. Murdoch	Television film
2002	Power Rangers Wild Force	Don	Episode: "The Tornado Spin"
2002	Laverne & Shirley: Together Again	Himself	Television special
2005	The Bold and the Beautiful	Las Vegas Minister	2 episodes
2006	24	Ned	Episode: "Day 5: 7:00 a.m.-8:00 a.m."
2006	It's Always Sunny in Philadelphia	Bobby Thunderson	Episode: "Hundred Dollar Baby"
2007	Crossing Jordan	James Talbot	Episode: "Shattered"
2007	The Suite Life of Zack & Cody	Western Director	Episode: "The Suite Life Goes Hollywood: Part 2"
2008	Pastor Greg	FJ	2 episodes
2008	ER	Jenkins	Episode: "Under Pressure"
2011	The Young and the Restless	Bud	2 episodes
2012	Childrens Hospital	Frankie	Episode: "Wisedocs"
