= David Lander =

American actor (1947–2020)

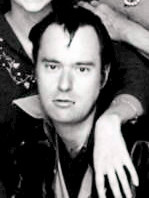
- Lander in 1976
- Born: David Leonard Landau; June 22, 1947; New York City, New York, U.S.
- Died: December 4, 2020 (aged 73); Los Angeles, California, U.S.
- Resting place: Hollywood Forever Cemetery
- Education: Carnegie Tech, New York University
- Occupations: Actor; comedian; musician; baseball scout; activist; author
- Years active: 1970–2017
- Known for: Andrew "Squiggy" Squiggman in Laverne & Shirley
- Spouses: Thea Markus (m. 1969; div. 1976) Kathy Fields (m. 1979)
- Children: Natalie Lander

David L. Lander (born David Leonard Landau; June 22, 1947 – December 4, 2020) was an American actor, comedian, musician, and baseball scout. He was best known for his portrayal of Andrew "Squiggy" Squiggman in the ABC sitcom Laverne & Shirley. He served as a goodwill ambassador for the National Multiple Sclerosis Society.

== Early life ==
David Leonard Landau was born on June 22, 1947, in Brooklyn, New York, the youngest son of two Jewish schoolteacher parents, Stella (Goldman) and Saul Landau.

Lander decided to become an actor when he was 10. He studied at the High School for the Performing Arts and continued at Carnegie Tech and New York University. It was in high school he took the stage name of David Lander, which he would later legally adopt, after a classmate "borrowed" his real name to register with an actors' union.

== Career ==
He was best known for his role as Andrew Helmut "Squiggy" Squiggman on the situation comedy Laverne & Shirley from 1976 to 1982 along with sitcom sidekick Lenny, played by Michael McKean.

Lander's partnership with McKean began during their acting classes at Pittsburgh's Carnegie Mellon University, where they developed the characters of Lenny and Squiggy. After Pittsburgh, they teamed up in the Los Angeles–based comedy ensemble The Credibility Gap. The duo released an album as Lenny and the Squigtones in 1979 featuring Christopher Guest on guitar, credited as Nigel Tufnel, a name Guest would later reuse in the spoof rock band Spinal Tap. Lander and McKean also appeared together in the 1979 Steven Spielberg comedy 1941, and the 1980 Kurt Russell film Used Cars. Lander voiced the main-cast character of Henry the penguin in the children's animated TV series Oswald from 2001 to 2003, with McKean voicing occasional guest characters in the series.

Lander appeared in numerous other TV shows, including The Bob Newhart Show, Barney Miller, Happy Days (as Squiggy), Viva Valdez, Married... with Children, Twin Peaks, On the Air, The Weird Al Show, Mad About You, Pacific Blue, and The Drew Carey Show. His other film roles included the part of a minor league baseball radio announcer in the film A League of Their Own (directed by Laverne & Shirley star Penny Marshall) and a bit part of the minister officiating the marriage ceremony in Say It Isn't So. He also played "Tanning Intruder" in Christmas with the Kranks. Lander created the starring role of the demented fast-food franchise clown Bruce Burger in the cult film Funland, directed by Michael A. Simpson.

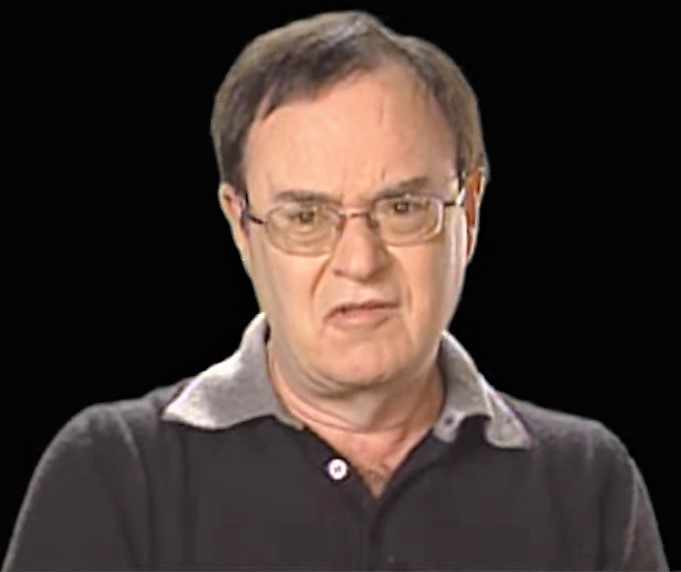
Lander giving an interview

Lander's voice acting roles included the "dramatic reproduction" of Elvis Presley quotations for the Pop Chronicles music documentary and the voice of Jerry Lewis in the Filmation series Will the Real Jerry Lewis Please Sit Down in 1970. He voiced "Doc Boy" Arbuckle, the farm-boy brother of Jon Arbuckle, in most animated adaptations of the Garfield franchise. Later voice roles included The Big Bang, A Bug's Life, Tattooed Teenage Alien Fighters from Beverly Hills, Titan A.E., Tom and Jerry: The Movie and the animated TV series Galaxy High as the six-armed Milo de Venus. In 2002, he reprised his role as Squiggy in the animated sitcom The Simpsons. Lander was the voice of Smart Ass, the chief weasel of Judge Doom's Toon Patrol in the 1988 Disney film Who Framed Roger Rabbit. Lander reprised his role as Smart Ass on the related ride, but the character was renamed Wiseguy. He was credited as Stephen Lander in Boo, Zino & the Snurks. One of his later roles was that of Ch'p in the DC Comics animated film Green Lantern: First Flight. His final credit was an episode of Goldie & Bear in 2017.

He played the psychiatrist in the video for "Why's Everybody Always Pickin' on Me?" by The Bloodhound Gang.

=== Sports ===
Lander, a Pittsburgh Pirates fan, had a small stake in the Portland Beavers. In 1997, he began work as a baseball talent scout, first for the Anaheim Angels, and later for the Seattle Mariners. He was a member of the Society for American Baseball Research, the baseball sabermetrics organization, for many years.

== Personal life ==
Lander was married to Thea Markus from 1969 until the couple divorced in 1976. He married Kathy Fields in 1979. His daughter with the latter is actress Natalie Lander.

=== Health and death ===
Lander was diagnosed with multiple sclerosis at Cedars-Sinai Medical Center in Los Angeles in 1984. He went public in 1999 and regularly spoke at related conventions. In 2002, his autobiography was published, titled Fall Down Laughing: How Squiggy Caught Multiple Sclerosis and Didn't Tell Nobody (ISBN 1-58542-052-2), written with Lee Montgomery.

Lander died of complications from multiple sclerosis at Cedars-Sinai Medical Center on December 4, 2020. He was 73. He was cremated at Hollywood Forever Cemetery. His urn was entombed in a columbarium within its Abbey of Psalms Mausoleum.

== Filmography ==
=== Film credits ===
Year	Title	Role	Notes
1977	Cracking Up	Carl Adler / Alistair Kakowski / Mr. Hickenlooper	Credited as The Credibility Gap
1979	1941	Joe	
1980	Wholly Moses!	The Beggar	
1980	Used Cars	Freddie Paris	
1982	Pandemonium	Pepe	
1983	Imps*	Fritz #1	Segment: "Interrogation"
1985	The Man with One Red Shoe	Stemple	
1987	The Big Bang	Fred	Voice
1987	Steele Justice	Army Guard	
1987	Funland	Bruce Burger	
1988	Who Framed Roger Rabbit	Smart Ass	Voice
1990	Masters of Menace	Squirt	
1991	Steel and Lace	Schumann	
1992	A League of Their Own	Radio Sportscaster	Uncredited
1992	Tom and Jerry: The Movie	Frankie da Flea	Voice
1993	Betrayal of the Dove	Norman	
1994	Ava's Magical Adventure	The Mayor	
1998	A Bug's Life	Thumper	Voice, outtakes
1998	The Modern Adventures of Tom Sawyer	Mayor Burgabom	
1999	Baby Huey's Great Easter Adventure	Bernie	Direct-to-video
2000	Titan A.E.	The Mayor	Voice
2000	Scary Movie	Principal "Squiggy" Squiggman	
2000	The Tangerine Bear	Theodore, Store Clerk	Voice, direct-to-video
2001	Say It Isn't So	Reverend Stillwater	
2001	Dr. Dolittle 2	Bird	Voice
2001	Jimmy Neutron: Boy Genius	Yokian Guard, Gus	Voice
2002	Jane White Is Sick & Twisted	Gerry King	
2004	Christmas with the Kranks	Tanning Intruder	
2006	Zoom	Wendy's Employee	
2006	Tomoko's Kitchen	Gene	Short
2009	Green Lantern: First Flight	Ch'p	Voice, direct-to-video

=== Television credits ===
Year	Title	Role	Notes
1970–1972	Will the Real Jerry Lewis Please Sit Down	Jerry Lewis	Voice, 18 episodes
1972	Love, American Style		Voice, episode: "Love and the Old-Fashioned Father"
1972	The ABC Saturday Superstar Movie	Jud	Episode: "Gidget Makes the Wrong Connection"
1974	The Bob Newhart Show	Milt the Delivery Boy	Episode: "Ship of Shrinks"
1975	Rhoda	Mel Towers	Episode: "Call Me Grandma"
1975	Barney Miller	David Gordon	Episode: "Hot Dogs"
1976	Viva Valdez	Harry	Episode: "Weekend"
1976–1983	Laverne & Shirley	Andrew 'Squiggy' Squiggman	156 episodes
1979	Happy Days	Andrew 'Squiggy' Squiggman	Episode: "Fonzie's Funeral: Part 2"
1984	The Love Boat	Arnold Herlick	2 episodes
1985	Highway to Heaven	Ed	Episode: "The Smile in the Third Row"
1985	George Burns Comedy Week		Episode: "The Honeybunnies"
1986	Tall Tales & Legends	Mr. Sylvester	Episode: "My Darlin' Clementine"
1986	Galaxy High	Milo de Venus	Voice, 13 episodes
1987	Matlock	Eli Walsh	Episode: "The Convict"
1987	A Garfield Christmas	Doc Boy	Voice
1988	Simon & Simon	Alvie 'The Weasel' Hortsnagel	Episode: "Bad Betty"
1989	Father Dowling Mysteries	Eric Becker	Episode: "What Do You Call a Call Girl Mystery"
1989	Monsters	James Self	Episode: "Their Divided Self"
1989	Married... with Children	Eli	Episode: "Married... with Prom Queen: The Sequel"
1989	Star Trek: The Next Generation	Ferengi Tactical Officer	Episode: "Peak Performance"
1989	Knight & Daye		Episode: "Stalk Radio"
1989	Freddy's Nightmares	Lenny Nordhoff	Episode: "Lucky Stiff"
1990	Head of the Class	Mr. Freelik	Episode: "Alan Goes Crimson"
1990	TaleSpin	Weazel	Voice, episode: "Vowel Play"
1990	A Pup Named Scooby-Doo		Voice, 3 episodes
1990	Midnight Patrol: Adventures in the Dream Zone		Voice, 13 episodes
1990–1991	Twin Peaks	Tim Pinkle	3 episodes
1991	ProStars		Voice
1991–1993	Tom & Jerry Kids	Bernie the Swallow	Voice, 3 episodes
1992	On the Air	Valdja Gochktch	7 episodes
1992	Camp Candy	Additional voices	Episode: "When It Rains... It Snows"
1992	Batman: The Animated Series	Nitro	Voice, episode: "Appointment in Crime Alley"
1992	The Little Mermaid	Da Shrimp	Voice, 3 episodes
1993	Matrix	Freddy Flanagan	Episode: "False Witness"
1993	Family Album	Mr. DeVito	Episode: "Winter, Spring, Summer or Fall All You Gotta Do Is Call..."
1994	Getting By	Sid Smollen	Episode: "Sell It Like It Is"
1994–1995	Tattooed Teenage Alien Fighters from Beverly Hills	Lechner	Voice, 26 episodes
1994, 1996	Saturday Night Live	Squiggy	2 episodes
1995	Family Matters	Oliver	2 episodes
1995	Dream On	The Other Norman Mailer	Episode: "Significant Author"
1995	The Nanny	The Landlord	Episode: "Val's Apartment"
1996	Homeboys in Outer Space	Inspector 17	Episode: "House Party or, Play That Funky White Music Droid"
1996	The Tick	Filth #4	Voice, episode: "The Tick vs. Filth"
1996	Superman: The Animated Series	Sqweek	Voice, episode: "The Main Man"
1996	Hey Arnold!	Sewer King	Voice, episode: "The Sewer King"
1996–1997	Pacific Blue	Elvis Kryzcewski	14 episodes
1996–1998	Jungle Cubs	Arthur	Voice, 20 episodes
1997	L.A. Heat	Cecil Rusk	Episode: "In Transit"
1997	Nash Bridges	Norman Guilfoyle	Episode: "Gun Play"
1997	Johnny Bravo	Christopher	Voice, 2 episodes
1997	Space Ghost Coast to Coast	Himself	Episode: "Boobookitty"
1997	The Weird Al Show	Miner	Episode: "Mining Accident"
1997–1998	The Bold and the Beautiful	Dr. Martin 'Marty' Guthrie	12 episodes
1997–1998	101 Dalmatians: The Series	Horace Badun	Voice, 28 episodes
1998	Diagnosis: Murder	Willie Andrews	Episode: "Food Fight"
1999	Sabrina, the Teenage Witch	Postmaster	Episode: "Sabrina, the Teenage Writer"
1999	Mad About You	Announcer #1	Episode: "Separate Beds"
1999	Arliss	Wrestling Promoter	Episode: "To Thine Own Self Be True"
1999	Recess	Leonard Weems	Voice, 2 episodes
2000	100 Deeds for Eddie McDowd	Caesar	Voice, 2 episodes
2001	Black Scorpion	Eugene Gardner/Greenthumb	Episode: "Roses Are Red, You're Dead"
2001–2003	Oswald	Henry	Voice, 22 episodes
2002	The Simpsons	Squiggy	Voice, episode: "Helter Shelter"
2004	The Grim Adventures of Billy & Mandy	Brain	Voice, episode: "The Nerve"
2005	Hopeless Pictures	Les	Voice
2007	The Grim Adventures of Billy & Mandy	Curtis	Voice, episode: "Wrath of the Spider Queen"
2009	Raising the Bar	Jury Foreman	Episode: "I'll Be Down to Get You in a Taxi, Honey"
2009–2013	The Garfield Show	Doc Boy Arbuckle	
2011	The Problem Solverz	Glam-Vampire Member	Episode: "Glam-Vampire Hunterz"
2015	Break a Hip	Charlie	6 episodes
2016	SpongeBob SquarePants	Donnie the Shark	Voice, episode: "Sharks vs. Pods"
2017	Goldie & Bear	Rumpelstiltskin	Voice, episode: "Gnome Family Reunion/Adorable Norm" (final role)

=== Video game credits ===
Year	Title	Role
1996	Down in the Dumps	Mr. Blub, Old Louse
1997	Lego Island	The Brickster, Shark, Gideon Worse
1997	Zork: Grand Inquisitor	Voice of the Inquisition, Bickering Torch
