= Phil Foster =

American actor (1913–1985)

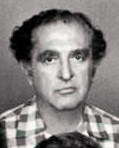
- Foster in 1976
- Born: Fivel Feldman; March 29, 1913; New York City, U.S.
- Died: July 8, 1985 (aged 72); Rancho Mirage, California, U.S.
- Occupation: Actor
- Years active: 1955–1985

Phil Foster (born Fivel Feldman; March 29, 1913 – July 8, 1985) was an American actor and performer, best known for his portrayal of Frank DeFazio in Laverne & Shirley.

== Early life ==
Foster was born Fivel Feldman in Brooklyn, New York City on March 29, 1913, the son of Jewish immigrants from Russia who had changed their name from Vishnodosky.

According to Foster's appearance on To Tell the Truth (airdate April 9, 1957) he once went by the name of "Michael" Feldman.

== Career ==
Foster took his stage name from Foster Avenue in Brooklyn. His first taste of performing came as a child, when he and his friends began singing and dancing in front of movie theaters. He then began appearing in amateur shows, competing for prizes. With him on occasion was another beginner named Jackie Gleason.

At the height of the Great Depression, Foster started in the dramatic field, playing in halls, back rooms and wherever possible during a period when theaters weren't available. "We did all sorts of plays, including all of Clifford Odets' early works — for $28 to $35 a week, living three in a room eating — if there was any food around", he recalled.

Foster made his debut as a nightclub comic in Chicago in the late 1930s when he was pushed out on the floor suddenly to fill in for a stand-up comic. "I just got up and talked", he says. "I didn't know you were supposed to have an act. But I was offered the job at $125 a week." Foster had intended to return to acting, but reportedly found himself in constant demand in nightclubs across the country.

=== Post-war ===
During World War II, Foster served in the United States Army. Upon his discharge, he returned to New York and became a variety-show favorite with an act comprising stories based on his curious childhood in Brooklyn. During the 1950s, Foster made several comedy short subjects for Universal-International as "Brooklyn's Ambassador to the World". Because of his popularity, he was chosen by George Pal as one of the military space crewmen on a trip to Mars in Conquest of Space.

Among Foster's many television appearances were guest-starring roles in Ten-Four Productions' telefilm The Great American Traffic Jam and NBC's $weepstake$ and Games People Play. He made several return visits to The Ed Sullivan Show and Toast of the Town along with This Is Show Business, The Tonight Show Starring Johnny Carson, and The Patty Duke Show. On The Jerry Lewis Show, he traded comic jabs with Cassius Clay shortly before the first Clay vs. Liston fight. He appeared in films, notably Bang the Drum Slowly.

It was Garry Marshall, an old friend whom he helped get started as a comedy writer for Joey Bishop and other entertainers, who lured Foster again to Hollywood, first to appear in The Odd Couple and then to co-star in Laverne & Shirley, at which time he was living in Fort Lee, New Jersey. His later TV appearances included Fantasy Island in 1978, and on The Love Boat in 1977, where he played an aging, out-of-touch, boorish comedian.

== Personal life and death ==
Foster appeared on an episode of Tattletales with his wife Joan Featherston. The couple had two sons, Michael and Danny. Foster died of a heart attack in Rancho Mirage, California, on July 8, 1985, at the age of 72.

== Filmography ==
- Brooklyn Goes to San Francisco (1947) – Phil Foster
- Conquest of Space (1955) – Jackie Siegle
- The Patsy (1964) – Mayo Sloan
- Hail (1972) – Michael Moloney
- Every Little Crook and Nanny (1972) – Police Lt. Bozzaris
- Bang the Drum Slowly (1973) – Joe Jaros
- Jacqueline Susann's Once Is Not Enough (1975) – Cab Driver
- Laverne & Shirley (1976-1982) – Frank DeFazio
- The Happy Hooker Goes to Washington (1977) – Senator Krause
- Fantasy Island (1978) TV serial, ep. "The Over-the-Hill Caper/Poof!You're a Movie Star"
- Gridlock (1980) - Koppleman
- Texas Godfather (1985) - Ralph Salerno (final film role)
