= Happy Days season 1 =

Season 1 of the television series Happy Days

Happy Days
- Season 1
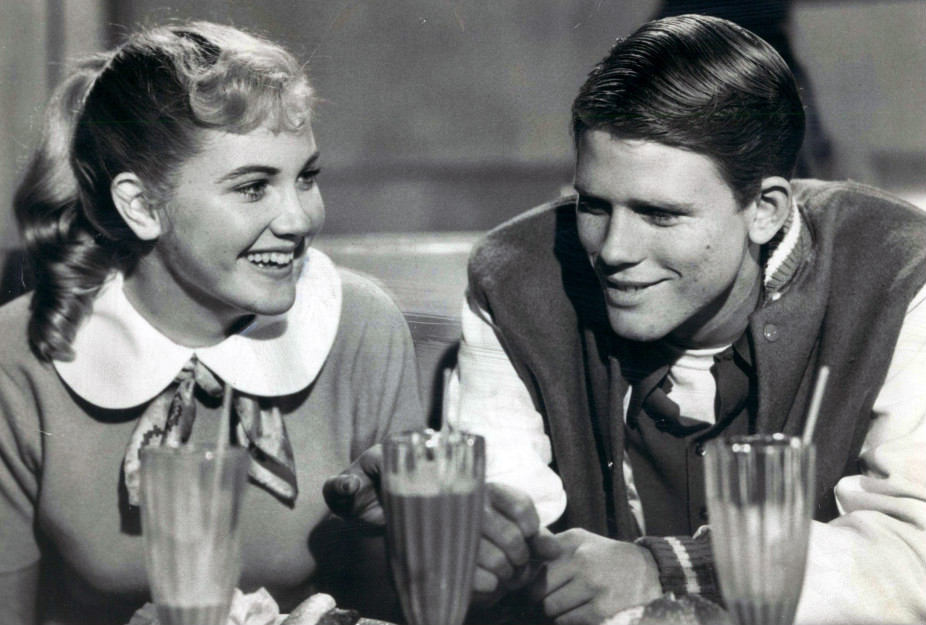
- Kathy O'Dare and Ron Howard in the premiere episode, "All the Way"
- No. of episodes: 16

Release
- Original network: ABC
- Original release: January 15 – May 7, 1974

Season chronology
- Next → Season 2

The first season of Happy Days, an American television sitcom, originally aired on ABC in the United States between January 15 and May 7, 1974. The show was created by Garry Marshall, under the production company Miller-Milkis Productions, in association with Paramount Television.

== Background ==
Before the show was picked up, it was initially filmed in 1971 as a pilot for New Family in Town. It was rejected by most networks at the time. A year later, ABC picked it up and the pilot for the series was aired as part of an episode of Love, American Style in a segment titled "Love and the Television Set", originally aired on February 25, 1972. For syndication reruns, this was retitled "Love and the Happy Days." The role of sister Joanie was played by 12-year-old Susan Neher; while father Howard was played by Harold Gould; and brother Chuck (Charles) was played by Ric Carrott.

The story opens with the Cunninghams buying their first television set, an expensive novelty in the 1950s. Potsie convinces Richie to use that as an enticement to get a girl to agree to a date, which he does but in the end Richie gets crushed. His father uses his wisdom of experience to console him. Howard is so entranced by his new TV that he sits alone in the living room watching nothing but a test pattern and tone.

A newly recorded version of "Rock Around the Clock" by Bill Haley & His Comets was used as the opening theme song for this and the following season; while the show's closing theme song was a fragment from "Happy Days" (although in a different recording with a different lyric from that which would become the standard version used since season three), whose music was composed by Charles Fox and whose lyric was written by Norman Gimbel.

The series premiered at mid-season during the 1973-74 television season, replacing Temperatures Rising which was faltering on ratings during its second season. The first season of the show, which consisted on 16 episodes, proved to be a hit for the network, ending at the 16th most-watched show in the US for that season. Airing on Tuesdays at 8:00 PM, it remained on that timeslot for ten consecutive seasons until 1983.

== Cast and characters ==
=== Main cast ===
- Ron Howard as Richie Cunningham
- Marion Ross as Marion Cunningham
- Anson Williams as Warren "Potsie" Weber
- Tom Bosley as Howard Cunningham

=== Recurring cast ===
- Henry Winkler as Arthur "Fonzie" Fonzarelli
- Don Most as Ralph Malph
- Erin Moran as Joanie Cunningham
- Gavan O'Herlihy as Chuck Cunningham
- Beatrice Colen as Marsha Simms
- Neil J. Schwartz as "Bag" Zombroski
- Tita Bell as Trudy
- Barry Greenberg as Moose

== Broadcast history ==
The season aired Tuesdays at 8:00-8:30 pm (EST).

== Episodes ==
No. overall	No. in season	Title	Directed by	Written by	Original release date
1	1	"All the Way"	Mel Ferber	Rob Reiner & Philip Mishkin and Garry Marshall	January 15, 1974
Potsie fixes Richie up with Mary Lou Milligan, a girl with a "reputation" around town. Richie doesn't get far with her but leads Fonzie and the others to believe he did. Notes: The pilot was filmed on November 12, 1973.; Two versions of this episode exist. The original version of the episode featured a few alternate takes and extended scenes. Additionally, a different actress portrayed the role of Joanie. The dinner table sequence at the Cunninghams' house was later reshot with Erin Moran.; In this episode, Arnold's Drive-In was spelled as Arthur's, as exteriors were shot at Arthur's Restaurant in Burbank, California.; Guest starring: Kathy O'Dare as Mary Lou; Danny Jacobson as Pat; Richard Hurst as Cook.
2	2	"The Lemon"	Jerry Paris	Dick Bensfield & Perry Grant	January 22, 1974
Richie and Potsie spend their hard-earned savings on their first car in an attempt to impress and attract girls; but although the car looks impressive, it soon becomes apparent that it's not the most roadworthy of vehicles. Notes: This episode was filmed on December 11, 1973.; This was the first episode of the series directed by Jerry Paris.; Beginning with this episode, the drive-in changed its name to "Arnold's".; Guest starring: Cindy Eilbacher as Betty Wilkens.
3	3	"Richie's Cup Runneth Over"	Jerry Paris	William S. Bickley & Bob Brunner	January 29, 1974
Richie gets drunk at a stag party. Notes: This episode marks the first appearance of Arnold's waitress Marsha Simms (played by Beatrice Colen).; This episode featured the first exterior shot of the Cunningham house. It also has the first shot of Richie's room.; The party's name is "From Here to Maternity." Referencing the 1953 film From Here to Eternity.; Guest starring: Louisa Moritz as Verna LaVerne; Lennie Weinrib as Duke; Tim Haldeman as Arnold; Tom Harris as Vince.
4	4	"Guess Who's Coming to Visit?"	Jerry Paris	Lowell Ganz & Mark Rothman	February 5, 1974
Potsie talks Richie into sneaking out of his house to watch Fonzie compete in a midnight drag race. Howard pursues Richie when he hears about this illegal activity. A police officer (Herb Voland) has the teenagers arrested and taken to the local police station. He informs the teenagers about the recent law about drag racing being illegal in Wisconsin. He subsequently calls the parents of all teenagers except Richie and Potsie. The next day, all participants of the illegal midnight drag race have the requirement to go home after school for their penalty. Notes: This episode was filmed on January 22, 1974.; This episode marked the first time Fonzie wears his black leather jacket.; The episode's title is a reference to the 1967 movie Guess Who's Coming to Dinner.; Guest starring: Alan Abelew as Skizzy; Herb Voland as Sergeant; Laura Michaels as Jean; Julie Graham as Cheerleader; Carey Williams as Girl.
5	5	"Hardware Jungle"	Jerry Paris	Frank Buxton & Michael Leeson	February 12, 1974
Richie has to miss a rock concert to take care of his dad's hardware store. Guest starring: George Ives as Dr. McKay; Peter Brocco as Mr. Egan; Robert Casper as Customer; Richard Doran as Bert.
6	6	"The Deadly Dares"	Herb Wallerstein	Steve Zacharias	February 19, 1974
Richie and Potsie want to become members of a local gang called the Demons. But before being accepted as full-fledged members, they must perform the "six deadly dares". Notes: This episode marked the first appearance of Neil J. Schwartz on his role as "Bag" Zombrowski, who became later Richie's band drummer during its first years.; Guest starring: Ed Begley Jr. as Hank; John Riley as O'Reilly; Lou Tiano as Rocky; John Wheeler as Mr. Crenshaw.
7	7	"Fonzie Drops In"	Mel Ferber	William S. Bickley & Bob Brunner	February 26, 1974
Fonzie decides to re-enroll in high school. After rearranging the seating plan to his satisfaction, he asks Richie to do his homework and cheat for him. Guest starring: Jessica Myerson as Miss Pratt; Stuart Nisbet as Mr. Faraday; Jean Fraser as Sandy; Richard Doran as Kid.
8	8	"The Skin Game"	Mel Ferber	William S. Bickley	March 5, 1974
Richie and Potsie go to see a stripper named Bubbles McCall (Barbara Rhoades). Guest starring: Barbara Rhoades as Bubbles McCall; Arthur Batanides as Eddie; Lee Paul as Mory; Billy Sands as Waiter; Frank Sivero as Pockets. Note: Tom Bosley was sick the whole week of filming.
9	9	"Breaking Up Is Hard to Do"	Jerry Paris	William S. Bickley	March 12, 1974
Richie and his girlfriend Arlene (Laurette Spang) decide to break up. Since it is too late to secure new dates for the upcoming high school prom, Richie and Arlene attend as friends. Notes: This episode was filmed on February 5, 1974.; The episode's title comes from the song of the same name, most famously sung by Neil Sedaka.; Guest starring: Laurette Spang as Arlene.
10	10	"Give the Band a Hand"	Jerry Paris	Dick Bensfield & Perry Grant	March 26, 1974
Richie and the boys form a band to raise money, but Potsie loses it all in a poker game and Howard has to win it back for him. Notes: This episode marked Richie's band debut and the first time Potsie sings on the series.; This episode marks the last appearance of Gavan O'Herlihy as Chuck Cunningham. For the next season, the role would be portrayed by Randolph Roberts.; Guest starring: Bruce Kimmel as Murf; Don Carter as Brian; Ding Dingle as Waitress. Songs performed: "All Shook Up" – performed by Anson Williams (lead vocals); Ron Howard (guitar); Donny Most (piano) and Neil J. Schwartz (drums).
11	11	"Because She's There"	Peter Baldwin	Jack Winter	April 2, 1974
For Ralph's costume party, Potsie sets Richie up on a blind date with Phyllis (Diana Canova), who towers over him. Also starring: Beatrice Colen as Marsha Simms. Guest starring: Diana Canova as Phyllis Denton; Gracia Lee as Hazel; Mike Monahan as Harry Mel; Karen Duitsman as Susan Denton; Barry Greenberg as Moose.
12	12	"In the Name of Love"	Don Weis	Jack Winter	April 9, 1974
Potsie and Ralph are in love with Cindy Shellenberger, an attractive new girl at school, who asks Richie to study with her. Guest starring: Mary Cross as Cindy Shellinberger; Dick Balduzzi as Joe; Robert Karvelas as Man
13	13	"Great Expectations"	Jerry Paris	Story by : Peggy Elliott & Ed Scharlach; Teleplay by : Bob Brunner & Michael Leeson	April 16, 1974
Richie meets a beatnik named Deidre at the movies and gets caught up in her lifestyle. Note: This was the first of two episodes under the same title, the other one was from season 9, which was also titled "Great Expectations". Guest starring: Udana Power as Deidre; Danny Goldman as Lawrence; Valerie Curtin as Poetess.
14	14	"The Best Man"	Jerry Paris	Joel Kane	April 23, 1974
Howard lets a black army buddy have his wedding at the Cunningham home, and faces racial prejudice from their neighbors. Guest starring: Robert DoQui as Fred Washington; Bill Henderson as Mr. Davis; Gail Cameron as Carol; Amzie Strickland as Mrs. Finley; Wonderful Smith as Reverend; Edward Marshall as Officer Kincaid. Absent: Anson Williams as Potsie; Donny Most as Ralph.
15	15	"Knock Around the Block"	Jerry Paris	Ben Joelson & Art Baer	April 30, 1974
Richie and the gang try to get Potsie's bike back from the gang who stole it.
16	16	"Be the First on Your Block"	Jerry Paris	Richard Morgan	May 7, 1974
Howard decides to build a bomb shelter; but when Richie tells his friends, problems quickly arise when each assumes they will have a spot reserved in the shelter for them too, should the need arise. Guest starring: Ronnie Schell and Christina Hart.
