= Making It =

Making It (or Makin' It) may refer to:

- Makin' It (TV series), short-lived television sitcom in 1979
  - "Makin' It" (song), the theme song performed by series star David Naughton
- Making It (film), 1971 film written by Peter Bart
- Making It (TV series), 2018 unscripted reality competition series, co-hosted by Amy Poehler and Nick Offerman
  - Making It Australia (TV series), a 2021 Australian series based on the American version, co-hosted by Susie Youssef and Harley Breen
