= CWP =

CWP may refer to:

- Cable & Wireless plc (stock symbol on the New York Stock Exchange)
- Cakewalk Project, a Cakewalk Sonar sequencing software project file
- Camp White Pine
- Causeway Point
- Centralized Warning Panel (see Annunciator panel)
- Chinese Wikipedia
- Chronic Widespread Pain (see Fibromyalgia#Genetics)
- Coalition of Women for a Just Peace
- Coalworker's pneumoconiosis
- Commonwealth Writers' Prize
- Communist Workers' Party (United States)
- Computing with words and perceptions
- Concealed Weapons Permit, see Concealed carry in the United States
- Coordinating Working Party on Fishery Statistics
- Cotswold Water Park
- Cotswold Wildlife Park, a zoo in Oxfordshire, England
- Crown Wheel and Pinion, see Differential (mechanical device)
- Current Warming Period, see Global warming
- Catch Wrestling Promotion, name since 2023 for the former European Wrestling Promotion, a German/Austrian wrestling promotion, successor to the Catch Wrestling Association
- CWP Renewables, Australian company
