= Meatballs (film) =

1979 comedy film by Ivan Reitman

- Theatrical release poster by Morgan Kane
- Directed by: Ivan Reitman
- Written by: Len Blum; Dan Goldberg; Janis Allen; Harold Ramis
- Produced by: Daniel Goldberg
- Starring: Bill Murray; Harvey Atkin; Kate Lynch; Russ Banham; Kristine DeBell; Sarah Torgov; Chris Makepeace
- Cinematography: Donald Wilder
- Edited by: Debra Karen
- Music by: Elmer Bernstein
- Production companies: Famous Players; CFDC; Haliburton Films
- Distributed by: Paramount Pictures
- Release date: June 29, 1979
- Running time: 94 minutes
- Country: Canada
- Language: English
- Budget: $1.2–1.6 million
- Box office: $70 million

Meatballs is a 1979 Canadian comedy film directed by Ivan Reitman. It is noted for Bill Murray's first film appearance in a starring role and for launching the directing career of Reitman, whose later comedies include Stripes (1981) and Ghostbusters (1984), both starring Murray.

It is the first of six film collaborations between Murray and Harold Ramis. It spawned three sequels, of which only Meatballs III: Summer Job (1986) had any connection to the original.

== Plot ==
Tripper Harrison leads a group of new counsellors-in-training (CITs) at Camp North Star, a cut-rate summer camp located in Ontario, and leads practical jokes on camp director Morty Melnick, mainly by taking Melnick from his cabin late at night so that he awakens in unusual places.

Rudy Gerner, a lonely boy whose mother died about a year earlier, is sent to summer camp by his workaholic father, but decides to run away. Noticing Rudy is lacking self-confidence, Tripper tracks him to a nearby bus station and takes him under his wing. They rapidly bond as friends after many morning jogs. While helping Rudy to gain self-confidence, Tripper attempts to woo Roxanne, the girls' head counsellor. Many of the CITs also find romance: Candace "kidnaps" Crockett in a speedboat and confesses her feelings for him, while Wheels, who had broken up with A.L. the year before, successfully rekindles their relationship during a dance, and the nerdy Spaz falls for the tomboy Jackie.

A subplot deals with North Star's rivalry with Camp Mohawk, a wealthy summer camp located across the lake. During a basketball game, North Star is being beaten by Mohawk when they attempt their own perverse form of victory. This sets the stage for the yearly Olympiad between the camps, which Mohawk has won 12 consecutive times.

During the first day of competition, Mohawk dominates North Star, often winning by cheating. Crockett fails to clear the high jump bar, Hardware gets pummelled in boxing, and Jackie suffers a broken ankle in field hockey, thanks to the dirty work of two Mohawk girls. The score at the end of Day One is: Mohawk 170, North Star 63. That evening at the North Star Lodge, Tripper rouses the demoralized campers by explaining that victory or defeat is unimportant. In unison, Camp North Star begins to chant, "It just doesn't matter!" Day Two of the Olympiad belongs to newly inspired North Star as they win every event. Wheels outwrestles his opponent, Spaz defeats Rhino in a stacking contest with inspiration from Jackie and a thwarted Mohawk cheating attempt, and, after 12 years of North Star defeats, Fink finally beats "The Stomach" in the Hot Dog-eating contest. North Star now trails by only 10 points with one event left, a four-mile cross country run for 20 points. Tripper offers to select a surprised Rudy to compete against Horse, Mohawk's star runner. Rudy's many mornings spent jogging and training with Tripper pay off as he wins the race, giving North Star its first Olympiad victory by a score of 230–220.

Later that evening, Morty, Tripper, Roxanne and the CITs sing around a campfire and say their final goodbyes as the camp prepares to close at the end of summer. Rudy has already decided to return to camp next year and Roxanne agrees to live with Tripper. The two ride off on Tripper's motorcycle, leading the buses out of camp and leaving Morty behind, in bed, on a raft in the middle of the lake.

== Cast ==
- Bill Murray as "Tripper" Harrison
- Harvey Atkin as Morty "Mickey" Melnick
- Kate Lynch as Roxanne
- Russ Banham as Bobby Crockett
- Kristine DeBell as A.L.
- Sarah Torgov as Candace
- Jack Blum as "Spaz"
- Keith Knight as Larry "Fink" Finkelstein
- Cindy Girling as Wendy
- Todd Hoffman as "Wheels"
- Margot Pinvidic as Jackie
- Matt Craven as "Hardware" Renzetti (billed as Matt Cravenn)
- Norma Dell'Agnese as Brenda
- Chris Makepeace as Rudy Gerner
- Ruth Rennie as Jody
- Hadley Kay as Bradley

== Production ==
Harold Ramis said that Reitman did not know for certain whether Murray would be in the film until he showed up for the third day of filming. Eddie Deezen was approached to play Spaz but declined as he was already committed to 1941.

Filming took place at Camp White Pine, on Hurricane Lake, between Haliburton and West Guilford, Ontario, in August–September 1978.

== Critical response ==
Review aggregation website Rotten Tomatoes gives the film a score of 71% based on 38 reviews. The website's critical consensus reads: "Meatballs is a summer camp comedy with few surprises, but Bill Murray's riffing adds a spark that sets it apart from numerous subpar entries in a frequently uninspired genre".

Vincent Canby of The New York Times wrote, "With far fewer high spirits than Animal House, and only two characters of any interest, Meatballs reveals itself to be a loud, off-key cry for conformism of a most disappointing sort. It's a sheep in wolf's clothing." Dale Pollock of Variety wrote: "Record of tv stars making the transition to feature films is spotty overall, but Bill Murray proves a welcome exception to the rule. The Saturday Night Live regular manages to sock over Meatballs with amazing vitality and elan."

Gene Siskel of the Chicago Tribune gave the film 2.5 stars out of four, and stated that it "is pleasant as can be, but there's hardly a belly laugh in it. Murray plays a nice guy counselor who befriends a lonely camper. It's all very sweet, but funny? Not particularly." Kevin Thomas of the Los Angeles Times called the film "a fast, funny sendup of summer-camp life" that "is not as all-out raunchy as Animal House—but it's hilarious in a similar blissfully uncomplicated and nutty way." Gary Arnold of The Washington Post wrote: "Meatballs is as tartly, unpretentiously funny as its title ... As the senior boys' counselor, an easygoing role model and spontaneous comic genius, Bill Murray of Saturday Night Live makes a deceptively sensational debut as a film comedy star." Jack Kroll of Newsweek remarked that "this film has almost none of the scraggy, raunchy, irreverent anarchy that gave Animal House a kind of perverse anti-style. There's nothing at all perverse about Meatballs; in fact, it's so cutesy, squeaky-clean that it becomes Andy Hardy with a few extra belches."

In 2023, Barry Hertz of The Globe and Mail named the film as one of the 23 best Canadian comedy films ever made.

== Box office ==
The film was a surprise hit. It opened in seven theatres in Toronto and grossed $105,635 in its first four days. A week later, it opened on 93 screens in New York, grossing $1.5 million for the week and placing fifth at the US box office. It grossed $17.9 million in its first 17 days of national release. The film was the first Canadian film to gross more than $2.5 million in Canada, surpassing 1970's Deux femmes en or, to become the highest-grossing film of all time, with a gross of $4.2 million, winning the Golden Reel Award for the year. It also became the highest-grossing Canadian film in the United States, with a combined gross of $43 million in the United States and Canada. It was also the highest-grossing film in the US without any US investment at the time until surpassed by Chariots of Fire in 1982. The film grossed $70 million worldwide.

== Music ==
The film's score was written by Elmer Bernstein and several musicians also contributed to the soundtrack, including Mary MacGregor (performing "Good Friend"), David Naughton (performing "Makin' It", which served as the theme for his title sitcom, which was cancelled before the film's release), and Rick Dees and His Cast of Idiots (performing the title theme "Meatballs"). "Good Friend" and "Makin' It" made the Billboard and Cashbox pop charts (see below).

=== Singles ===
- "Makin' It" (by David Naughton) (Billboard, number 5) / Still Makin' It (instrumental of A-side) -- RSO 916–1979
- "Good Friend" (by Mary MacGregor) (Billboard number 39) / Rudy and Tripper (dialogue from film) -- RSO 938–1979

=== Album ===
Meatballs RSO 1-3056 (Billboard, number 170, August 1979)

Side one

1. "Are You Ready for the Summer" – North Star Camp Kids Chorus
2. "Rudy and Tripper" (instrumental)
3. "Makin' It" – David Naughton
4. "Moondust" – Terry Black
5. "C.I.T. Song" – Original Cast

Side two

1. "Good Friend" – Mary MacGregor
2. "Olympiad" (instrumental)
3. "Meatballs" – Rick Dees
4. "Rudy Wins the Race" (instrumental)
5. "Moondust (Reprise)" – Terry Black
6. "Are You Ready for the Summer (Reprise)" – North Star Camp Kids Chorus

== Home media ==
Meatballs was first released on DVD in 1999 by HBO (although Paramount Pictures was behind the original theatrical release and the first VHS, Betamax and SelectaVision release in the 1980s, and also continues to hold international video rights.) Sony Pictures Entertainment issued a special-edition DVD (with an anamorphic transfer, a director's commentary, and a "Making of" featurette) on June 5, 2007. The sequels did not receive the same treatment on re-release. However, Lionsgate released the Blu-ray on June 12, 2012, and the DVD reissue on February 22, 2022, which retains the commentary from the Sony DVD but not the featurette.

== Sequels ==
Meatballs was followed by three sequels: Meatballs Part II (1984), Meatballs III: Summer Job (1986) and Meatballs 4 (1992), none of which involved either Reitman or Murray. Only Meatballs III had any relation to the story or characters of the original, featuring Patrick Dempsey as Rudy Gerner.

== Television reboot ==
A television reboot starring Robbie G.K. as was announced by Bell Media in June 2026.. Maddie Phillips joined the series alongside the supporting cast Mollie Guest, Jordan Kronis, Molly Lewis, Krista Nazaire, Markus McNamara, and Lachlan Quarmby in September. The eight-episode half-hour series is set to premiere on Crave in 2027.
