= Sharpe's Eagle =

1981 historical novel by Bernard Cornwell

- First edition
- Author: Bernard Cornwell
- Series: Richard Sharpe series
- Genre: Historical novels
- Publisher: Collins
- Publication date: 9 February 1981
- Publication place: United Kingdom
- Media type: Print (hardback and paperback) and audio-CD
- Pages: 266 pp (hardcover edition); 304 pp (paperback edition)
- ISBN: 0-00-221997-2 (hardcover edition); ISBN 0-00-617313-6 (paperback edition)
- OCLC: 16564604
- Preceded by: None (publication); Sharpe's Havoc (chronological)
- Followed by: Sharpe's Gold

Sharpe's Eagle is a historical novel in the Richard Sharpe series by Bernard Cornwell, first published in 1981. The story is set in July 1809, in the midst of the Talavera Campaign during the Peninsular War. It was the first Sharpe novel published, but eighth in the series' chronological order.

In subsequent re-publications, Sharpe's Rifles was numbered as the "first" novel in the original series (ending with Sharpe's Waterloo), while Eagle was numbered as the second.

== Plot summary ==
It is July 1809. During the Talavera Campaign, Sir Arthur Wellesley's army has entered Spain to confront Marshal Victor. Richard Sharpe and his small group of thirty riflemen, separated from their regiment during the retreat from Corunna, are attached to the newly arrived South Essex Regiment. Commanded by the cowardly and bullying Lieutenant Colonel Sir Henry Simmerson, the South Essex is a raw, inexperienced unit that Simmerson has drilled mercilessly with frequent use of the lash.

Sharpe takes it upon himself to shape the inexperienced and poorly trained redcoats into soldiers. He comes into conflict with Simmerson; his nephew, the arrogant Lieutenant Christian Gibbons; and Christian's friend, Lieutenant John Berry. The situation is further complicated by the rivalry that emerges between Sharpe and Gibbons for the affections of Josefina Lacosta, a Portuguese noblewoman who ran away from her husband after he took a mistress. Only two of the South Essex officers appear to have any real experience: Captain Lennox, a veteran of the 78th Highlanders' action at the Battle of Assaye, where Sharpe himself won his commission; and Captain Thomas Leroy, an American Loyalist who was forced to flee his homeland after the American War of Independence.

From Talavera, General Wellesley dispatches the South Essex, alongside Sharpe's riflemen and Major Michael Hogan's engineers, to blow up the bridge at Valdelacasa, so as to protect the army's flank as they march. To placate the Spanish, Wellesley is forced to send a Spanish regiment, the Regimento de la Santa Maria, as well. The seemingly straightforward mission becomes a disaster when both Simmerson and the Spanish unnecessarily cross the bridge due to pride, and then try to engage four squadrons of French dragoons. Due to a combination of arrogance, poor training and incompetence, the two regiments are routed by the French, with hundreds of men killed and wounded, Lennox fatally wounded, and the loss of the King's Colours. Sharpe, however, distinguishes himself during the skirmish by saving the South Essex's own colours and capturing a French cannon. As a dying request, Lennox asks Sharpe to take a French Imperial Eagle, "touched by the hand of Napoleon" himself, so as to erase the shame of losing the King's Colours.

Wellesley has Sharpe gazetted captain, and berates Simmerson for his bad leadership. In an attempt to shift the blame for the fiasco, Sir Henry tries to make Sharpe a scapegoat and intends on ruining Sharpe's career via his connections at Horse Guards. Sharpe concludes that only by capturing an Eagle can he shield himself from Simmerson's schemes. He also makes enemies of Gibbons and Berry when Josefina falls out with Gibbons, and Sharpe takes her under his protection. They become lovers, although Sharpe is forced to accept sizable loans offered him by Hogan in order to keep Josefina in the manner she is used to. Later, after Josefina is beaten and raped by Gibbons and Berry, Sharpe swears vengeance. He murders Berry during a night-time skirmish against the French.

At the height of the Battle of Talavera, Simmerson panics at the approach of a French column, and orders the South Essex to withdraw, despite direct orders from the British 2nd Division commander, General "Daddy" Hill, opening a gap in the lines. Sharpe desperately deploys his men to delay the French from exploiting it.

Sharpe's old friend, Lieutenant Colonel William Lawford, is sent to relieve Simmerson of command. Lawford orders the South Essex back into position, where their volleys help destroy the column's cohesion. Sharpe leads the Light Company and his rifles into the fray and captures an Eagle with help of his best friend, Sergeant Harper. Returning from the battlefield, Sharpe is ambushed by Gibbons, who attempts to murder Sharpe and take the Eagle for himself, but is killed by Harper. The capture of the Eagle restores the honour of the South Essex, but Sharpe's triumph is soured somewhat by Josefina's return to Lisbon with wealthy British cavalry Captain Claud Hardy.

Over a celebratory dinner, Wellesley bitterly informs his staff officers that, although the battle was won, the campaign will be accounted a failure, since the Spanish General Cuesta has blundered badly, and the promised provisions to feed the army are nowhere to be found, forcing the British to retreat back to Portugal. Wellesley promises that the British will return to Spain, but on their own terms. To Sharpe's surprise and embarrassment, Wellesley concludes his speech by proposing a toast to "Sharpe's Eagle." (This begins Cornwell's practice, in nearly all the Sharpe novels, of ending a book with the use of its title.)

== Characters ==
=== Fictional ===
- Richard Sharpe
- Patrick Harper – an Irish sergeant in the British Army, Sharpe's close friend and ally
- Captain Michael Hogan (Major in the TV adaptation) – British Army officer, engineer
- Captain Lennox (Major in the TV adaptation)
- Sir Henry Simmerson
- Christian Gibbons
- William Lawford
- Thomas Leroy
- Josefina LaCosta

=== Historical ===
- Sir Arthur Wellesley – commander of the British expeditionary force
- General Sir Rowland "Daddy" Hill
- Gregorio García de la Cuesta (mentioned only) – commander of the Spanish force allied with Wellesley's army
- Sir Banastre Tarleton (mentioned only) – Simmerson's cousin, now a high-ranking member of the Horse Guards

== References to actual history, geography and current science ==
- Sharpe's story is "intimately linked" with the real-life story of Sir Arthur Wellesley, who appears in this book and would be appointed Viscount Wellington of Talavera as a result of the events related.
- The novel depicts the real-life Battle of Talavera that occurred during the early stages of the Peninsular War. The primary historical difference, as admitted in Cornwell's historical postscript, is that no Eagle was captured during the battle. The rest is fairly accurate, and it provides an excellent historical insight into the life of soldiers at the time as "much of the detail in the book is taken from contemporary letters and diaries."
- Historically, the British first captured an Eagle during the Battle of Barrosa in 1811, which battle Cornwell would later cover in Sharpe's Fury.
- In reality, the 95th Rifles missed the Battle of Talavera; despite marching 65 kilometres (40 mi) in 24 hours they arrived too late. However, Cornwell does not write as though they did, only a small detachment led by Sharpe, separated from the regiment during the hurried retreat of the previous year.

== Adaptations ==
A 1993 TV adaptation of the same name was produced by Central Independent Television for the ITV network in the UK starring Sean Bean as Sharpe, Daragh O'Malley as Harper, Assumpta Serna as Teresa Moreno, Brian Cox as Major Hogan, David Troughton as Wellesley, Daniel Craig as Lieutenant Berry, Gavan O'Herlihy as Captain Leroy and Michael Cochrane as Simmerson. There are many differences between the plot of the television adaptation and the novel. Captain Lennox from the novel becomes a Major in the TV adaptation.

== Publication history ==
- 1981, UK, HarperCollins ISBN 0-00-221997-2, 9 February 1981, Hardback
- 1981, USA, Viking Press ISBN 0-670-63944-3, 9 February 1981, Hardback
- 1994, UK, HarperCollins ISBN 0-00-617313-6, 1 April 1994, Paperback
- 2004, USA, Signet ISBN 0-451-21257-6, 3 August 2004, Paperback

This is Bernard Cornwell's first novel. Cornwell's plan was "to write a series of tales about the adventures of a British rifleman in the Napoleonic Wars". He had wanted to start with the Siege of Badajoz but on reflection, he felt that this was too ambitious for his first novel. He decided to start with a couple of easier books as a warm-up. Cornwell wanted to find a task just as impossible as the taking of Badajoz for Sharpe's first adventure. The capture of a Regimental Eagle from a French Regiment provided the challenge the author felt necessary to establish the reputations of both Sharpe and his close friend, Sergeant Patrick Harper.
