= The Ted Knight Show =

The Ted Knight Show may refer to:

- The Ted Knight Show (1978 TV series), an American situation comedy that aired in 1978
- Too Close for Comfort, an American situation comedy that was retitled The Ted Knight Show during its final season in 1986
