= Laverne & Shirley season 1 =

Laverne & Shirley
- Season 1
- DVD cover
- Starring: Penny Marshall; Cindy Williams; Michael McKean; David Lander; Phil Foster; Eddie Mekka
- No. of episodes: 15

Release
- Original network: ABC
- Original release: January 27 – May 18, 1976

Season chronology
- Next → Season 2

The first season of Laverne & Shirley, an American television sitcom series, began airing on January 27, 1976 on ABC. The season concluded on May 18, 1976 after 15 episodes.

The series is a spin-off from Happy Days, as the two lead characters were originally introduced on that series as acquaintances of Fonzie (Henry Winkler). Set in roughly the same time period, the timeline runs from approximately 1958, when the series began, through 1967, when the series ended. As with Happy Days, it was made by Paramount Television, created by Garry Marshall (along with Lowell Ganz and Mark Rothman) and executive produced by Garry Marshall, Edward K. Milkis, and Thomas L. Miller from Miller-Boyett Productions.

The season aired Tuesdays at 8:30-9:00 pm (EST), with a lead-in from its parent series, Happy Days. Its only competition was a CBS series titled Popi. It ranked 3rd among television programs and garnered a 27.5 rating. The entire season was released on DVD in North America on August 17, 2004.

== Overview ==
The series revolves around the titular characters Laverne DeFazio and Shirley Feeney, bottle-cappers at Shotz Brewery in 1950s Milwaukee, Wisconsin. Episode plots include their adventures with neighbors and friends, Lenny and Squiggy.

== Cast ==
=== Starring ===
- Penny Marshall as Laverne DeFazio
- Cindy Williams as Shirley Feeney
- Michael McKean as Leonard "Lenny" Kosnowski
- David Lander as Andrew "Squiggy" Squiggman
- Phil Foster as Frank DeFazio
- Eddie Mekka as Carmine Ragusa

=== Guest Starring ===
- Henry Winkler as Arthur "Fonzie" Fonzarelli
- Robert Hays as Tom
- Fred Willard as Charles
- Mark Harmon as Victor
- Pat Carroll as Lily Feeney, Shirley's mother

== Episodes ==
No. overall	No. in season	Title	Directed by	Written by	Original release date
1	1	"The Society Party"	Garry Marshall	Bob Brunner	January 27, 1976
The girls mingle at a party being thrown by their boss's family, but their revelry is cut short when another guest accuses them of theft.
2	2	"The Bachelor Party"	Jerry Paris	Lowell Ganz & Mark Rothman	February 3, 1976
Laverne permits Fonzie to have a bachelor party at the Pizza Bowl when her father leaves her in charge, but when the "entertainment" cancels, she begs Shirley to step in.
3	3	"Bowling for Razzberries"	Alan Myerson	Marty Nadler	February 10, 1976
Despite her illness, Laverne is determined to beat a snotty tour guide in a bowling tournament.
4	4	"A Nun's Story"	Alan Myerson	Michael Warren & William Bickley	February 24, 1976
The girls attend a class reunion where they meet an old classmate who's gone from being wild to being a nun. Guest Stars: Rochelle Winter as Anne Marie and Greg Antonacci as Hector.
5	5	"Falter at the Altar"	Jay Sandrich	Arthur Silver	March 2, 1976
Although she's only been dating him for two months, Laverne decides to marry her boyfriend.
6	6	"Dog Day Blind Dates"	James Burrows	Dale McRaven	March 9, 1976
The girls have a double-blind date that turns into a disaster when their dates turn out to be bank robbers. Guest stars: Fred Willard and Guich Koock.
7	7	"Once Upon a Rumor"	Howard Storm	Holly Mascott	March 16, 1976
Lenny starts a rumor that Squiggy and Shirley are an item, even though Squiggy was just fixing Shirley’s skirt zipper.
8	8	"One Flew Over Milwaukee"	Michael Kidd	Michael Warren & William Bickley	March 23, 1976
Shirley drives everyone cuckoo with her mothering of her pet canary.
9	9	"Dating Slump"	Alan Myerson	Arthur Silver	March 30, 1976
Shirley's exact dating standards have left her dateless.
10	10	"It's the Water"	Dennis Klein	Greg Strangis	April 6, 1976
Laverne is jealous of Shirley's promotion.
11	11	"Fakeout at the Stakeout"	Alan Myerson	Deborah Leschin & David W. Duclon	April 13, 1976
Laverne goes undercover as a decoy to help catch a thief.
12	12	"Hi, Neighbors"	Alan Myerson	Michael McKean & David L. Lander & Harry Shearer	April 27, 1976
Lenny and Squiggy move into the girls' building, becoming their new neighbors. Guest Star: Helen Page Camp as Mrs. Havenwurst.
13	13	"How Do You Say 'Are You Dead' in German?"	John Thomas Lenox	Bob Brunner	May 4, 1976
A German deliveryman (Peter Elbling) faints in the girls' apartment, leading them to assume he's dead.
14	14	"From Suds to Stardom"	James Burrows	Buz Kohan	May 11, 1976
The girls have lost out of making the company's talent competitions for the past four years, but they're determined to make it this year.
15	15	"Mother Knows Worst"	Alan Myerson	Arthur Silver	May 18, 1976
Shirley's mother, Lily, comes for a visit. Guest Star: Helen Page Camp as Mrs. Havenwurst and Pat Carroll as Mrs. Lily Feeney.
