= Greg Antonacci =

American actor, director, and producer (1947–2017)

- Antonacci on Boardwalk Empire
- Born: February 2, 1947; New York City, U.S.
- Died: September 20, 2017 (aged 70); Massapequa, New York, U.S.
- Occupation: Actor
- Years active: 1971–2017
- Spouse: Annie Potts (m. 1978; div. 1980)

Greg Antonacci (February 2, 1947 – September 20, 2017) was an American actor. He portrayed Johnny Torrio in Boardwalk Empire in every season, from 2010 to 2014, and Phil Leotardo's right-hand man Butch DeConcini in The Sopranos from 2006 to the series finale in 2007.

== Early life and education ==
Antonacci was born in New York City and attended the Power Memorial Academy in Manhattan. He matriculated to Queens College, where was introduced to theater.

== Career ==
As a director, producer, and writer, he worked on a number of television series, including Busting Loose, Brothers, The Tortellis, Perfect Strangers, The Royal Family, The John Larroquette Show, Herman's Head, It's a Living, Soap, and other series.

As an actor, he had roles in The Rockford Files, as Vinnie Morabito on Busting Loose, Tony Manucci on Makin' It, Butch DeConcini on The Sopranos, and Johnny Torrio on Boardwalk Empire. In 1976, he played the role of Hector in "A Nun's Story" and "Good Time Girls" during season two of Laverne & Shirley. He made a cameo appearance as a mobster in the 2013 film The Family.

Antonacci was also a playwright, theatrical actor, and director, participating in multiple productions and roles at the La MaMa Experimental Theater Club in the East Village throughout the early through mid-1970s. He wrote and performed in the 1971 Off-Off-Broadway musical "Dance Wi' Me (or, The Fatal Twitch)," which was directed by Joel Zwick and produced at La MaMa. This play was produced again at La MaMa in 1974, and then renamed and re-staged as the Broadway musical "Dance With Me," opening January 23, 1975 at the Mayfair Theatre in New York City.

Antonacci directed the failed ABC pilot Joanna (1985) as well as the sequel TV movie Splash, Too (1988).

== Personal life and death ==
Antonacci died at the age of 70 in Massapequa, New York, on September 20, 2017.

== Filmography ==
Year	Title	Role	Notes
1972	Summer Soldiers	Miguel	
1974	The Rehearsal		
2006-2007	The Sopranos	Butch DeConcini	
2013	The Family	NY Mobster	Uncredited
2010-2014	Boardwalk Empire	Johnny Torrio	
