= Happy Days season 2 =

American television sitcom

Happy Days
- Season 2
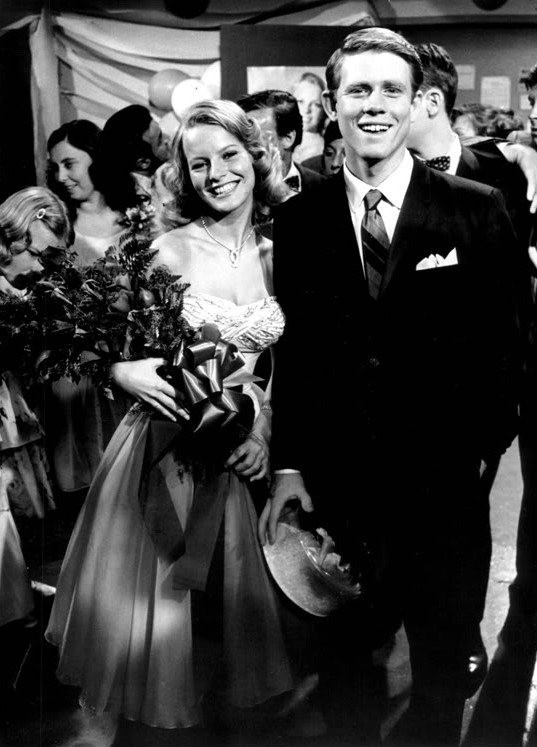
- Cheryl Ladd and Ron Howard in the episode, "Wish Upon a Star"
- No. of episodes: 23

Release
- Original network: ABC
- Original release: September 10, 1974 – May 6, 1975

Season chronology
- ← Previous; Season 1 Next → Season 3

The second season of Happy Days, an American television sitcom, originally aired on ABC in the United States between September 10, 1974 to May 6, 1975. The show was created by Garry Marshall, under the production company Miller-Milkis Productions, in association with Paramount Television.

== Background ==
Starting with this season, Henry Winkler and Donny Most were added to the main cast, being included now to the opening credits. The second season consisted on 23 episodes. This was the last season of the series where "Rock Around the Clock" was the show's original theme song. The song did not appear on the Season 2 DVD release due to music licensing issues, being replaced with the Happy Days theme. This is also the last season to have the original version of "Happy Days" as the closing theme. This season and the previous one, were filmed using a single-camera setup and laugh track, however, the episode "Fonzie's Getting Married" became the first episode of the series filmed in front of a studio audience with three cameras as a test run.

The series was a modest hit when it debuted in early 1974, however, ratings began to fall during its second season, causing the show's creator Garry Marshall to retool it. This was due to CBS programming head Fred Silverman, who scheduled the Maude spin-off Good Times on the same night and timeslot as Happy Days, in an attempt to kill the ABC show's growing popularity, and it worked, as the show reached a new low at number 49 on the Nielsen ratings for the 1974-75 season. This would change when Silverman was named president of ABC in 1975, and came up with a way to save the show he tried to kill the year before, eventually Happy Days would not be on top of the Nielsen ratings until its fourth season.

== Cast and characters ==
=== Main cast ===
- Ron Howard as Richie Cunningham
- Marion Ross as Marion Cunningham
- Anson Williams as Warren "Potsie" Weber
- Henry Winkler as Arthur "Fonzie" Fonzarelli
- Don Most as Ralph Malph
- Tom Bosley as Howard Cunningham

=== Recurring cast ===
- Erin Moran as Joanie Cunningham
- Randolph Roberts as Chuck Cunningham
- Beatrice Colen as Marsha Simms
- Neil J. Schwartz as "Bag" Zombroski
- Tita Bell as Trudy
- Misty Rowe as Wendy
- Linda Purl as Gloria
- Danny Butch as Raymond "Spike" Fonzarelli

== Broadcast history ==
The season originally aired Tuesdays at 8:00-8:30 pm (EST).

== Episodes ==
No. overall	No. in season	Title	Directed by	Written by	Original release date
17	1	"Richie Moves Out"	Jerry Paris	Ben Joelson & Art Baer	September 10, 1974
Richie feels he is lacking privacy at home, so he decides to move in with Chuck; but Richie soon discovers that bachelor life is not all it's cracked up to be. Notes: Starting with this episode, Henry Winkler and Donny Most were added to the opening credits.; This episode introduces Randolph Roberts taking over the role as Chuck Cunningham; Misty Rowe as Wendy, a carhop at Arnold's; and Linda Purl as Richie's girlfriend Gloria.
18	2	"Richie's Car"	Jerry Paris	Bob Brunner & Michael Leeson	September 17, 1974
With his dating style being cramped by Howard driving him everywhere, Richie convinces his father to buy a second family car for him to use on weekends. He persuades Howard to buy a car that Fonzie is selling, but his amorous plans hit a roadblock when he hears that the car is stolen. Guest starring: Karl Swenson as Detective; Joshua Shelley as Happy; Suzanne Roth as Charmaine; Lew Horn as Officer Marlow.
19	3	"Who's Sorry Now"	Jerry Paris	Michael Leeson	September 24, 1974
Arlene is back in town, and Richie goes on a date with her. But very soon, Arlene thinks that Richie wants to go steady with her, and Richie tries to find a way to put her off. Note: The flashbacks used in this episode are scenes from the pilot that aired as part of Love, American Style in 1972. Guest starring: Tannis G. Montgomery as Arlene; Virginia Gregg as Mrs. Nestrock; Robert Nichols as Mr. Nestrock; Laura Siegel as Rita; Jane Lambert as The Woman; Gary Morgan as Usher.
20	4	"You Go to My Head"	Jerry London	Phil Mishkin	October 1, 1974
Richie finds that he has a problem asking girls out on a date. After reading a book about abnormal psychology, Richie becomes convinced that there's something really wrong with him, and seeks help from a psychiatrist. Note: A Rebel Without a Cause movie visit is shown with no mention of James Dean's death. The film was released October 27, 1955, barely a month after his death. Guest starring: Ivor Francis as Dr. Castle; Christina Hart as Carole; Cathey Paine as Girl; Pamela Peters as Annie.
21	5	"R.O.T.C."	Jerry Paris	Mickey Rose	October 8, 1974
Richie is chosen to be put in charge of his R.O.T.C. Army cadet force at Jefferson High; but he has a battle on his hands to put his pals, including Potsie and Ralph, into shape; and finds out that command and friendship are two very different things. Note: This episode was filmed on July 15, 1974. Guest starring: Dave Ketchum as Lt. Colonel Binicky; Richard Kuller as Charlie.
22	6	"Haunted"	Garry Marshall	Bruce Shelly & Dave Ketchum	October 29, 1974
It's trick-or-treat time when the gang indulge in frightening frolics as Ralph plans to hold his annual Halloween party at the old Simpson house, which is supposedly haunted by the ghost of the headless "Old Lady Simpson." Richie must confront his own fears about the ghost. Notes: This was the only episode Garry Marshall directed for the series.; Garry Marshall's three children –Lori, Kathie and Scotti– appeared on this episode.; Guest starring: Lori Marshall as Witch; Kathleen Marshall as Princess; Scott Marshall as Cowboy.
23	7	"Wish Upon a Star"	Herb Wallerstein	Dick Bensfield & Perry Grant	November 12, 1974
Richie wins a date to the school dance with Hollywood starlet Cindy Shea (Cheryl Ladd). But what on earth will his girlfriend say? And is Richie really cut out for a life of glitz and glamour? Guest starring: Cheryl Ladd as Cindy; Frank Ashmore as Johnny; James Daughton as Larry; Bryan O'Byrne as Mr. Carlyle; Michael Dan Wagner as Student.
24	8	"Not With My Sister, You Don't"	Jerry Paris	Dick Bensfield & Perry Grant	November 19, 1974
Marion and Howard are apprehensive about Joanie's first date. Their worries deepen when they learn that her date is Fonzie's young nephew Spike. After a talk about the birds and the bees, Richie is instructed to use his own date to keep an eye on his little sister. Note: This episode introduces Danny Butch as Spike. Guest starring: Susan Denbo as Carol; Don Potter as Harry. Tony Randall uncredited cameo as Werewolf in movie
25	9	"Big Money"	Jerry Paris	Greg Strangis & Jerry Rannow	November 26, 1974
Richie is a contestant on a TV trivia game show Big Money. Richie's friends and family all help him brush up on his baseball knowledge—but then he is given an envelope by the host (Dave Madden) with the answers. Will Richie follow his conscience or take the money and run ? Notes: This episode is inspired by the quiz show scandals of the 1950s.; This episode marked the final appearance of Linda Purl as Richie's girlfriend Gloria. Purl would return later in season 10 as Ashley Pfister.; Guest starring: Dave Madden as Jack Whippett; James Ritz as Quincy; Lou Wagner as Mr. Schnieber.
26	10	"A Star is Bored"	Jerry Paris	Bobby Boswell	December 3, 1974
Richie, Potsie, and Ralph plan to mount a production of Hamlet to raise money for baseball uniforms. When they are unable to get a celebrity to play the lead role, they persuade Fonzie to take the part. Guest starring: Britt Leach as Reverend Harlan; Alice Nunn as Mrs. Stewart; Ronnie Schell as Monty Miller.
27	11	"Guess Who's Coming to Christmas"	Frank Buxton	Bill Idelson	December 17, 1974
The gang is looking forward to spending Christmas with their families, but Richie discovers that Fonzie will be spending his all alone; so he invites Fonzie home to spend Christmas with the family. Notes: This episode also marks the final appearance of Chuck Cunningham.; This episode aired again as a Season 4 episode on December 21, 1976, where an additional scene was added at the beginning of this episode. The altered version has also aired in syndication sometimes, but has never been released in any home media format.; Randolph Roberts was hit in the eye by the present on the decoration, causing his eye to swell and eventually turn black and blue giving him a black eye. Guest starring: Robert Casper as Orville; Marjorie Bennett as Mrs. Harrison.
28	12	"Open House"	Jerry Paris	Bill James	January 7, 1975
While Richie's parents are away, Richie and Potsie unexpectedly find themselves hosting three stranded young women whose car has broken down. Guest starring: Melanie Baker as Lisa Ellis; Nancy Bell as Chris; Colleen Camp as Rose; Cindy Cassell as Penny; Joan Prather as Ruth; Patricia Wilson as Carhop
29	13	"Fonzie's Getting Married"	Jerry Paris	Lowell Ganz & Mark Rothman	January 14, 1975
Fonzie suddenly announces that he is getting married, and Howard recognizes the girl (Nellie Bellflower) as a stripper he saw at a hardware convention in Chicago. Notes: This episode was the first in the series to be filmed in front of an actual studio audience (likely as an experiment for audience responses), with Tom Bosley saying in voiceover: "Tonight's Happy Days was filmed before a live audience." It is evident that the experiment, if so, was successful, as beginning in the third season, all episodes of Happy Days would be filmed in front of live audiences.; This episode marked the first appearance of Garry Marshall, the show's creator.; Guest starring: Nellie Bellflower as Maureen Johnson/The Lone Stripper; Simmy Bow as Nightclub Emcee; Jack Perkins as Drunk in Nightclub; Garry Marshall as Drum Player (uncredited)
30	14	"The Cunningham Caper"	George Tyne	Michael Weinberger & James Ritz	January 21, 1975
Richie stays at home sick while the rest of the family take in a movie at the theatre. But then he hears noises downstairs, and finds himself face to face with a burglar, who forces him to help gather up the family's valuables. Note: Richie references Chuck in this episode when he tells the burglar that his brother, sister and him saved up to buy the silverware for their parents' 10th anniversary. Guest starring: Herb Edelman as Burglar.
31	15	"The Not Making of a President"	Jerry Paris	Lloyd Garver & Ken Hecht	January 28, 1975
It's election time, and Richie decides exactly which candidate to support—the one a cute blonde girl is campaigning for. But Richie becomes a victim of politics when his campaign efforts for Adlai Stevenson fall on the wrong side of Howard's political views. Meanwhile, Fonzie supports Dwight Eisenhower. Notes: Episode takes place in 1956.; This episode marked the first appearance of the show's director Jerry Paris.; Guest starring: Stephanie Steele as Debbie Hauser; Jerry Paris as Heckler (uncredited).
32	16	"Cruisin'"	Jerry Paris	Ron Friedman	February 11, 1975
With Marion having dented Richie's car; Richie, Potsie, and Ralph are forced to use Howard's DeSoto to go cruising for girls to ask to an upcoming dance. But the girls they meet are girlfriends of members of the Dragons, a local street gang who challenges them to a drag race. Note: Maureen McCormick portrays the girlfriend of one of the members of the Dragons. Guest starring: Maureen McCormick as Hildie; Michael Lembeck as Dooley.
33	17	"The Howdy Doody Show"	Jerry Paris	Bob Brunner	February 18, 1975
Facing a deadline for the school newspaper, Richie tries to get a photo of Clarabell the Clown from The Howdy Doody Show without makeup. To gain access to the set, Richie plans to get Ralph to enter a Howdy Doody lookalike contest, which the show is conducting. Guest starring: Buffalo Bob Smith as Himself; Bob Brunner as Clarabelle the Clown; Bruce Kimmel as Mark.
34	18	"Get a Job"	Jerry Paris	Bill Idelson	February 25, 1975
To earn some money; Richie, Potsie, and Ralph advertise as handymen, and agree to fix the fence of an attractive young divorcée. Ralph and Potsie each fancy their chances with the woman; but after they abandon Richie, she asks Richie to have dinner with her. Guest starring: Leslie Charleson as Ms. Dorothy Kimber.
35	19	"Fonzie Joins the Band"	Frank Buxton	Ben Joelson & Art Baer	March 4, 1975
Fonzie joins Richie's band to impress girls, but only has the talent to play the bongos. Guest starring: Adam Arkin as Bo; Susan Richardson as Carol Danson. Songs performed: "Splish Splash" – performed by Anson Williams (lead vocals); Ron Howard (piano); Donny Most (saxophone) and Neil J. Schwartz (drums).
36	20	"Fish and the Fins"	Jerry Paris	Phil Mishkin	March 11, 1975
No one believes Richie when he says he knows a member of the group Johnny Fish & The Fins (Flash Cadillac and The Continental Kids). Guest starring: Flash Cadillac and the Continental Kids as Fish and the Fins; Georganne La Piere as Corrine; Marjorie Bennett as The Lady; Borah Silver as Guard; Shelley Sparlock as Girl; Hank Stohl as Announcer. Songs performed: "Young Blood" – performed by Flash Cadillac and the Continental Kids: Sam "Flash" McFaden (guitar, vocals); Kris "Angelo" Moe (piano, vocals); Linn "Spike" Phillips III (guitar, vocals); Dwight "Spider Dumas" Bement (saxophone); Warren "Butch" Knight (bass, vocals); Wally Stewart (drums).
37	21	"Richie's Flip Side"	Herb Wallerstein	Greg Strangis & Jerry Rannow	March 18, 1975
Fame goes to Richie's head when he becomes a disc jockey. Guest starring: Warren Berlinger as DJ Charlie the Prince; Jesse White as Norman Bander; Jean Fraser as Sandy; Alberto Isaac as Busboy.
38	22	"Kiss Me Sickly"	George Tyne	Story by : Paul Lichtman & Howard Storm; Teleplay by : Michael Weinberger & James Ritz	April 29, 1975
Richie inadvertently makes out with Fonzie's girlfriend, and fears he may have contracted mono. Notes: Didi Conn, who played Joyce in this episode, would later land the role of Frenchie on the 1978 movie Grease.; This episode marked the final appearance of Misty Rowe on her role as Wendy.; Guest starring: Didi Conn as Joyce; Laurette Spang as Denise Hudson; Richard Kuller as Kid.
39	23	"Goin' to Chicago"	George Tyne	Frank Buxton	May 6, 1975
Richie, Potsie, and Ralph go on a trip to Chicago with the school choir. Not wanting to stay in their hotel room all night, Ralph convinces them to sneak out and see a comedy show at a burlesque house. Notes: George Furth, Lora Marie Taylor, Pamela Myers, Phil Leeds and Helen Page Camp guest star.; This is the last episode of the series where "Rock Around the Clock" is the theme song, and to have the original version of "Happy Days" as the closing theme.; Absent: Erin Moran as Joanie Cunningham
