= The Ted Knight Show (1978 TV series) =

- Genre: Sitcom
- Written by: Lowell Ganz; Mark Rothman; Susan Sisko; Richard Rosenstock
- Directed by: James Burrows; Jerry Paris; Joel Zwick
- Starring: Ted Knight
- Theme music composer: Michael Leonard
- Country of origin: United States
- Original language: English
- No. of seasons: 1
- No. of episodes: 6 (and 1 pilot)

Production
- Executive producers: Lowell Ganz; Mark Rothman
- Producers: Martin Cohan; David W. Duclon
- Production locations: Paramount Studios; Hollywood, California
- Running time: 30 minutes
- Production company: Hayadou Productions

Original release
- Network: CBS
- Release: April 8 – May 13, 1978

The Ted Knight Show is an American sitcom television series starring Ted Knight which centers on the owner of an escort service in New York City. The series aired on CBS from April 8, 1978 to May 13, 1978.

The series was a spin-off of Busting Loose and was one of two series Knight starred in that bore his name; in 1986 his sitcom Too Close for Comfort was retitled The Ted Knight Show after a significant retooling.

== Cast ==
- Ted Knight as Roger Dennis
- Normann Burton as Burt Dennis
- Thomas Leopold as Winston Dennis
- Iris Adrian as Dottie
- Cissy Colpitts as Graziella
- Fawne Harriman as Honey
- Ellen Regan as Irma
- Tanya Boyd as Philadelphia Phil Brown
- Janice Kent as Cheryl
- Deborah Harmon as Joy
- Claude Stroud as Hobart Nalven

== Synopsis ==
Suave, divorced, middle-aged Roger Dennis is the owner of Mr. Dennis Escort Service, a high-class escort service located in a fancy Manhattan apartment building in New York City. He hovers over the attractive young women – the air-headed Graziella; Honey, who has a "take-charge" personality; the timid Irma; Phil, who is the company's only African American escort; Cheryl, a floozy; and Joy – who serve as the escorts for his service. His brother Burt, a tyrannical, no-nonsense businessman, financed the company and is his business partner. Burt hired his wisecracking wife Dottie as the company's secretary; she answers the office telephone with "Mr. Dennis Escorts! Wherever you want to go, we want to go with you!" Roger's college-age son Winston is trying to break into the escort business, but is easily distracted and constantly makes passes at the women who work for Roger, and Roger feels that he lacks maturity and self-control. Hobart Nalven is the mailman who has a crush on Dottie.

== Production ==
The Ted Knight Show was Ted Knight's first attempt at starring in a show of his own after his run from 1970 to 1977 as newsman Ted Baxter on The Mary Tyler Moore Show. After its pilot, "Mr. Dennis Steps Out, " was broadcast on October 26, 1977, as the fifth episode of the second season of the sitcom Busting Loose, The Ted Knight Show was spun off as its own series in the spring of 1978. A disappointment, The Ted Knight Show drew low ratings and was cancelled after six weeks on the air. Episode director Joel Zwick later said that in his opinion CBS had thought that Knight's star power would carry the show, but that the premise of a situation comedy centering on an escort service was too strange for the show to succeed. Knight, meanwhile, said that in retrospect it had been a mistake for him to star in a new show so soon after the conclusion of The Mary Tyler Moore Show.

Lowell Ganz and Mark Rothman created the show, which CBS broadcast on Saturday at 8:30 p.m. throughout its brief run. It was filmed in color before a live studio audience at Paramount Studios in Hollywood, California.

== Episodes ==
=== Pilot (1977) ===
Title	Original release date
"Mr. Dennis Steps Out"	October 26, 1977
Melody Feebeck, an employee of Roger's escort service, believes that Roger is going to fire her. Broadcast as the fifth episode of the second season of the sitcom Busting Loose, with Busting Loose series regular Barbara Rhoades as Melody Feebeck.

=== Season 1 (1978) ===
No.	Title	Original release date
1	"Strike"	April 8, 1978
The women go on strike after Roger refuses to pay them double for serving as escorts at a gathering of practical jokers.
2	"My Hero"	April 15, 1978
After Roger does not give Graziella a raise he promised her, she signs a 30-year contract to work for his sleazy competitor.
3	"Hop to It"	April 22, 1978
Roger must deal with a drunken Easter Bunny and is appalled when Winston decides to work at a tacky clothing store that Burt runs.
4	"The Wedding"	April 29, 1978
Roger gets Honey to pose as his glamorous girlfriend at his ex-wife's wedding.
5	"Sweet Sixteen"	May 6, 1978
When a mature-looking young woman named Victoria Diamond approaches the Mr. Dennis Escort Service seeking an escort to a party, Roger thinks that escorting her will be a good chance for Winston to prove he can make it in the escort service business. But Victoria insists that Roger escort her, and when Roger arrives with her at the party, he discovers that she is only 16 years old, that it is her sweet sixteen party, and that she is using him to make her boyfriend Cliff jealous.
6	"The Honeymoon Game"	May 13, 1978
A woman hires Roger as her escort and cons him into pretending to be her husband on a television game show.
