= Gavan O'Herlihy =

Irish actor (1951–2021)

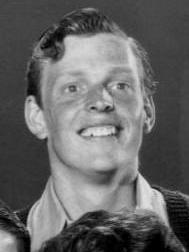
- O'Herlihy in 1974
- Born: Gavan John O'Herlihy; 29 July 1951; Dublin, Ireland
- Died: 15 September 2021 (aged 70); Bath, Somerset, England
- Education: Trinity College Dublin; Abbey Theatre School
- Occupation: Actor
- Years active: 1973–2021
- Spouse: Juliette O'Herlihy
- Children: 4
- Father: Dan O'Herlihy

Gavan John O'Herlihy (29 July 1951 – 15 September 2021) was an Irish actor. He was known for playing Chuck Cunningham in the first episodes of the television sitcom Happy Days, as well as his appearances in films such as Never Say Never Again, Superman III, Death Wish 3, and Willow. He was the son of actor Dan O'Herlihy.

== Early life ==
O'Herlihy was born 29 July 1951 in Dublin, Ireland, the son of Irish parents, actor Dan O'Herlihy and his wife, Sandymount native Elsie Bennett. He was raised in Malibu, California and Dublin.

After graduating from Phillips Academy in Massachusetts, he attended Trinity College, Dublin and as an avid tennis player, he became Irish national tennis champion.

== Career ==
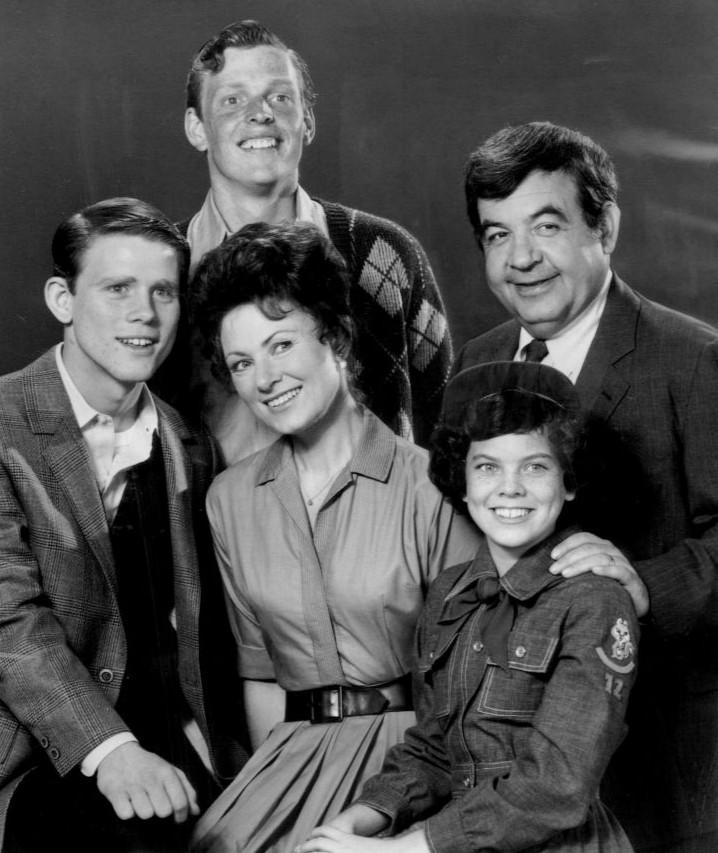
Cast of Happy Days (1974). Back, L–R: Gavan O'Herlihy, Tom Bosley. Front: Ron Howard, Marion Ross and Erin Moran

O'Herlihy's highest-profile role was as Jack Petachi, brother of Domino in the 1983 James Bond movie Never Say Never Again. He has over thirty screen credits to his name, most of them in villainous or antagonistic roles such as Superman III, Death Wish 3 and The Last Outlaw. His role as Airk Thaughbaer in the 1988 fantasy Willow is one of the few heroic roles that he has portrayed, as well as that of the dashing American Loyalist officer from Virginia Captain Leroy in Sharpe's Eagle.

He appeared in Rich Man, Poor Man and Tales From The Crypt. In 1994, he starred as John Garrideb in "The Mazarin Stone" from Granada TV's Sherlock Holmes series. The events of the story were rewritten and merged with The Adventure of the Three Garridebs.

He was cast as the eldest sibling, Chuck Cunningham, on Happy Days. He played Chuck during season 1 until the episode "Give the Band a Hand" and was replaced for season 2 by Randolph Roberts until the episode "Guess Who's Coming to Christmas". Chuck was not seen again but was later mentioned in a few other episodes ending with "Fish and the Fins". After that, Chuck was written off the show completely with later episodes depicting the Cunningham family with only two children with Richie as the elder. The character gave rise to the pejorative term "Chuck Cunningham Syndrome", referring to characters who disappear from TV shows without an in-universe explanation and are later retconned to have never existed. O'Herlihy did not want to become stuck in television roles, preferring films. He played a warrior in the George Lucas production Willow, directed by his Happy Days brother, Ron Howard. He also appeared in the pilot episode of Star Trek: Voyager, "Caretaker", as the Kazon First Maje, Jabin. He also appeared in The Six Million Dollar Man and The Bionic Woman television series.

O'Herlihy was cast as sadistic killer Dan Suggs in the 1989 miniseries Lonesome Dove.

After playing the role of a crooked RCMP officer in Twin Peaks (which also featured his father), O'Herlihy permanently relocated to the UK, where he preferred to work in the theatre and on television, with roles on British television, including Coded Hostile, Sharpe, Jonathan Creek and Midsomer Murders.

In 2009, O'Herlihy returned to the big screen as Sheriff Vaines in the follow-up to Neil Marshall's cult horror film, The Descent Part 2, and over a decade later returned to the screen again to play the leading role of writer John Anderson for director Nic Saunders in Queen of the Redwood Mountains, a film inspired by the authors of the Beat Generation, and due for release in 2026.

== Personal life ==
O'Herlihy had four children. He died in Bath, Somerset, on 15 September 2021, at the age of 70 of undisclosed causes.

== Selected filmography ==
- 1974 Happy Days as Charles "Chuck" Cunningham
- 1974 The California Kid as Tom
- 1977 The Ghost of Cypress Swamp as Big Bob Landers
- 1978 A Death in Canaan as Father Mark
- 1978 A Wedding as Wilson Briggs
- 1980 A Rumor of War as Stanton
- 1982 We'll Meet Again as Captain "Red" Berwash
- 1983 Superman III as Brad Wilson
- 1983 Never Say Never Again as Captain Jack Petachi
- 1983 The Secret Adversary (TV movie) as Julius P. Hersheimmer
- 1984 Space Riders as Ron Harris
- 1985 The Dirty Dozen: Next Mission (TV movie) as Conrad E. Perkins
- 1985 Death Wish 3 as Manny Fraker
- 1987 A Killing on the Exchange
- 1988 Willow as Airk Thaughbaer
- 1989 Lonesome Dove as Dan Suggs
- 1990 Twin Peaks as Preston King
- 1991 Conagher as Chris Mahler
- 1991 Tales from the Crypt as Richard
- 1993 The Last Outlaw as Marshal Sharp
- 1993 Sharpe's Eagle as Captain Leroy
- 1994 Sherlock Holmes (Episode: "The Mazarin Stone") as John Garrideb
- 1995 The Shooter as Dick Powell
- 1997 Prince Valiant as King Thane
- 1997 Top of the World as Lieutenant Logan
- 1998 Jonathan Creek as Hal Drucker
- 2000 Command Approved as Arms Dealer
- 2002 Butterfly Man as Bill Kincaid
- 2006 Seven Days of Grace as MacNab
- 2009 The Descent Part 2 as Vaines
- 2009 Midsomer Murders (Episode: "The Black Book") as George Arlington
- 2026 Queen of the Redwood Mountains as John Anderson
