= Russ Banham =

American author (born 1954)

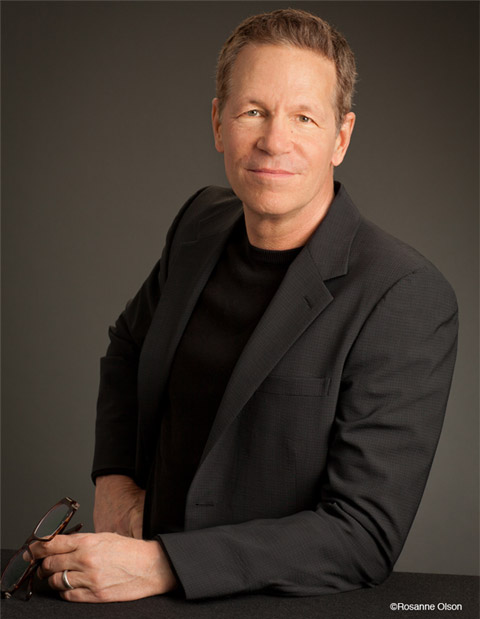
- Born: September 20, 1954 (age 71)
- Education: St. John's University; University of Montana (MA, MFA)
- Occupations: Author; journalist
- Website: www.russbanham.com

Russ Banham (born September 20, 1954) is an American author and reporter formerly with The Journal of Commerce and later a freelance journalist writing for The Wall Street Journal, Inc., Forbes, The Economist, Euromoney, Financial Times, Chief Executive and several other business publications and trade magazines.

Banham is the author of 32 books, including The Ford Century, an acclaimed history of Ford Motor Company translated into 13 languages; Higher, the best-selling history of aerospace giant Boeing and the U.S. aviation industry; Problem Solving: HBS Alumni Making a Difference in the World, a co-authored history of Harvard Business School (HBS), written with HBS Professor emeritus Howard Stevenson, and the first (2009) and second (2020) editions of The Fight for Fairfax, a 150-year political and economic history of Northern Virginia and the Greater Washington Region.

Banham is also a former actor known for co-starring with Bill Murray in the 1979 film Meatballs, and as a playwright and theatre director.

== Education and early life ==
Banham graduated from St. John's University in New York City, where he studied Speech and Theatre. He later earned a Master of Arts in Drama Theory and Criticism from the University of Montana. On a Jacob K. Javits Fellowship at the university, he also earned a Master of Fine Arts in Directing and Playwriting, while teaching classes in drama for three years.

== Early career ==
Banham made his Broadway acting debut in The Merchant, which starred Zero Mostel as Shylock, and was directed by two-time Tony award-winning director John Dexter. He also appeared in several Off- and Off-off-Broadway plays, and co-starred in the ninth biggest movie of 1979, Meatballs, directed by Ivan Reitman and starring Bill Murray in his first film role. That year he was cast as Brad Hopkins in producer Norman Lear's short-lived television situation comedy, Joe's World, opposite Christopher Knight from The Brady Bunch. The series ran for 12 episodes on NBC before it was cancelled. In 2024, Chief Executive magazine published a tribute to Norman Lear written by Banham.

With prospects as an actor quickly dimming, Banham produced the world premiere of Oliver Hailey's Kith and Kin at the Dallas Theatre Center and later at the White Barn Theatre in Greenwich, Connecticut, the latter directed by Tom O'Horgan, Tony Award nominee for the original production of Hair. He also produced the Off Broadway premiere of Hailey's Red Rover, Red Rover, with Tony Award winners Phyllis Newman and Helen Gallagher, at the Park Royal Theatre. Both received mixed reviews and failed commercially.

At the same time, he began his career in financial journalism, writing articles for The Journal of Commerce. The daily business newspaper, then owned by Knight-Ridder, asked him to join its staff in 1983 as a reporter and editor covering insurance and risk management. Banham left the paper in 1987 to pursue work as a freelance journalist.

== Enron ==
Banham's CFO magazine profile of Andrew Fastow, one year before the Enron debacle came to light, was cited by writer Kurt Eichenwald in his book, Conspiracy of Fools. "Banham … captured everything pretty well: asset securitization, special-purpose entities, the reduction of balance-sheet debt," Eichenwald wrote.

== U.S. Embassy ==
Banham was nominated for the 1987 Pulitzer Prize for Investigative Journalism by The Journal of Commerce for a series of articles he wrote disputing government reports that the Soviet Union had embedded the concrete walls of the U.S. Embassy in Moscow with eavesdropping devices. The U.S. demanded that the Soviets tear down the embassy and build a new one at their expense. Through an anonymous source, a high-ranking government official in the Nixon administration, Banham learned that the government had purchased a secret insurance policy making it extremely unlikely that the embassy building was bugged, the source stated. Banham filed a Freedom of Information request for the insurance policy, learning that it was underwritten by American International Group, Inc., and reinsured by Ingosstrakh, the Russian state insurer. In effect, the Soviet Union would be on the hook financially for repairing damage to the building. The finding made it extremely unlikely the Soviets would deliberately damage their new Embassy building, given the impact of an exorbitantly expensive tear-down and geopolitical crisis. The articles were cited in the Congressional Record. The Cold War ended before the alleged eavesdropping devices were ever ascertained.

== Histories and biographies ==
In 1996 Banham was approached to write his first book, a 100-year history of USF&G, a major national insurance company. He followed it up with similar chronicles of Coors Brewing Company, Conoco, Hawaiian Airlines, Guardian Life, Dover Corporation, New York Life, and many other companies. The Coors book, Rocky Mountain Legend, reached number four on the Denver Post's regional bestseller list.

Banham also wrote three authorized biographies: on discount brokerage magnate Ernest Jacob Olde, Houston developer Kenneth Schnitzer, and Gary Milgard, founder of Milgard Manufacturing, the third largest producer of windows in the U.S.

In 2019, Banham co-authored a history of Harvard Business School with HBS Professor emeritus Howard Stevenson, Problem Solving: HBS Alumni Making a Difference in the World, featuring stories from more than 200 HBS alumni applying their leadership and problem-solving skills to change the world for the better.

In recognition of Banham's numerous corporate histories, Leader's Edge magazine dubbed him "America’s Corporate Historian" in 2016. He has been interviewed about Boeing, Ford, Coors and Airstream by radio networks like NPR and appeared on several television news shows, including ABC 20/20, The Today Show and A&E Biography. Banham is featured in the documentaries, "How Factories Changed the World" and "Alumination." In 2022, Banham was asked by George Mason University to be the keynote speaker at the 50th anniversary of Mason's founding, a story he told in a chapter of his book, The Fight for Fairfax.

== Histories of Ford and Boeing ==
In 2003, Banham was asked to write the official 100-year history of Ford Motor Company. He obtained vital access to Ford family artifacts and company archives, culminating in The Ford Century. The book received favorable reviews in The New York Times and other publications. "Not only the Ford fan but the most casual student of American industrial history can get caught up in the saga, from the highs of Henry's invention of the moving assembly line and the explosive effect of his Model T on the masses to his elevation to near-holy utopian prophet, to the lows -- 30 years later -- of a senile Henry adrift at the helm of a company that had become half loony bin and half rat's nest, run by thugs and about to go belly-up any minute until . . . well, savor the story yourself." The book was selected as one of the five best books ever written about Detroit. More than 750,000 copies of the book are in print around the world. January Magazine called The Ford Century "a masterpiece of automotive writing." Upon the book's publication, The Today Show's Matt Lauer interviewed Banham and Charlie Rose devoted an entire show to The Ford Century.

Banham is also the author of Wanderlust, a tale of the author's travels in an iconic Airstream travel trailer, writing about its history, design and cultural impact; The Fight for Fairfax, (first and second editions), a post-World War II political and economic history of Northern Virginia, and Higher, a history of aerospace giant Boeing and the U.S. aviation industry. He obtained crucial access to the aerospace company's archives to produce "never-before seen photographs and inside stories ... tracing the company from its start ... in a boathouse in Seattle in July 1916 to becoming the world’s largest aerospace company and a technology innovator," The Chicago Tribune stated. Aviation Week hailed the book as a "meticulously researched overview," adding that Banham "masterfully captures the broad history and spirit of the company as it has evolved over the decades." The Wall Street Journal's review of the book was equally favorable, commenting, "'Higher' ably commemorates Boeing’s enduring achievement, gliding nimbly through its triumphs of design, engineering and manufacture and, not least, its memorable contributions to wars won." Walter Isaacson, best-selling biographer of Elon Musk, Steve Jobs and Albert Einstein, interviewed Banham about the book on his podcast, Trailblazers.

== Theatre ==
Banham is also a professional theatre playwright and director, directing Othello, Macbeth, Henry V, Twelfth Night, and A Doll's House for Seattle Shakespeare Company; Merchant of Venice for Wooden O Theatre; Of Mice and Men, Mauritius and Superior Donuts for Seattle Public Theatre; Crooked for Theater Schmeater; and three of his own plays, adaptations of Ethan Frome, Even Cowgirls Get the Blues (with Jennifer Sue Johnson) and Romance with a Double Bass (based on four short stories by Anton Chekhov), all for Book-It Repertory Theatre. Broadway World called Banham's direction of A Doll's House for Seattle Shakespeare Company a "crisp and engaging production. Once again he has assembled a stellar cast and crew and molded the story into a rock solid evening of theater." The Seattle Post-Intelligencer called Banham's musical version of Tom Robbins’ classic book Even Cowgirls Get the Blues a “bawdy blast” and a “lusty good time.” He is a recipient of five Seattle Times Footlight Awards as the city's Best Director.
