= Wicked, Wicked =

1973 film by Richard L. Bare

- US film poster
- Directed by: Richard L. Bare
- Written by: Richard L. Bare
- Produced by: Richard L. Bare
- Starring: David Bailey; Tiffany Bolling; Randy Roberts; Edd Byrnes; Scott Brady; Diane McBain; Madeleine Sherwood; Roger Bowen; Arthur O'Connell
- Cinematography: Frederick Gately
- Edited by: John F. Schreyer
- Music by: Philip Springer
- Production company: United National Pictures
- Distributed by: Metro-Goldwyn-Mayer
- Release date: June 13, 1973
- Running time: 95 minutes
- Country: United States
- Language: English
- Budget: $1.5 million

Wicked, Wicked is a 1973 American thriller film written, produced and directed by Richard L. Bare and starring David Bailey, Tiffany Bolling and Randolph Roberts. It was presented in "Duo-Vision", a gimmick more commonly known as split-screen.

== Plot ==
The Grandview is a sprawling Californian hotel with a terrible secret: single blonde visitors who check in don't check out. Hotel detective Rick Stewart begins investigating what's happened to a handful of vanishing guests but he soon becomes personally involved when his brunette ex-wife, Lisa James, arrives for a singing engagement at the hotel. When Lisa dons a blonde wig for her performance, she finds herself the next target of a psychopathic killer.

== Cast ==
- David Bailey as Rick Stewart
- Tiffany Bolling as Lisa James
- Randolph Roberts as Jason Gant
- Scott Brady as Police Sgt. Ramsey
- Edd Byrnes as Henry Peter 'Hank' Lassiter
- Diane McBain as Dolores Hamilton
- Roger Bowen as Simmons, Hotel Manager
- Madeleine Sherwood as Lenore Karadyne
- Stefanianna Christopherson as Genny (as Indira Danks)
- Arthur O'Connell as Mr. Fenley, Hotel Engineer
- Jack Knight as Bill Broderick

== Production ==
=== Script ===
The film was the brainchild of writer-director Richard L. Bare, who got the idea for the Duo-Vision gimmick while driving one day, when he noticed the line that divided the road. "As I glanced from one side of the freeway to the other, I noticed how my mind was taking a picture over here, then another over there," Bare later stated. "Why not tell a film story with two simultaneous images?"

The idea stayed in Bare's head for two years before he decided to pursue it. "I had a script I had written called The Squirrel which had been on the market but hadn't sold, so I just cut it up and patched scenes together here and there to make two parallel scripts." The script pages were divided in half, with each half of the page corresponding to what was to appear on screen. Finding a typewriter that could accommodate these unique needs proved challenging for the writer. "My first problem was finding a typewriter with a carriage wide enough to take a legal-size piece of paper sideways, so I could type parallel scripts," Bare said. "Then I had to find a duplicating machine that would do the same thing."

Once completed, Bare brought the script to William T. Orr, his former boss at Warner Bros. Together the pair formed a production company, United National Pictures, and brought the project to MGM. Within 48 hours, they sold it.

=== Casting ===
The casting of the killer proved to be a difficult challenge. "We needed intensity and passion as well as innocence, a combination of qualities we found to be rare among the many, many young actors we interviewed," Orr revealed. A young Vietnam veteran named Randolph Roberts was sent by his agent to audition for the role of Hank Lassiter (a minor part which ultimately went to Edd Byrnes). When Orr and Bare saw him, they knew they'd found their star. "It's impossible to believe that this is Randy's first motion picture," claimed Orr. "His experience in front of a camera is very limited. Yet he has a presence that reveals itself on film that I have found to be very rare." Bare was equally impressed. "There are many difficult scenes in which Randy, as the psychotic killer, must wordlessly and subtly express his progression from naive handyman to crazed killer in a matter of seconds," Bare said. "With all this, Randolph has still managed to make his character quite sympathetic."

Casting the role of hotel detective Rick Stewart was substantially easier. David Bailey had been in a popular commercial for Mitchum deodorant in which he proclaimed, "I didn't use any antiperspirant yesterday and I may not today." Bare saw the commercial and asked Bailey to come to California for an interview. "We had only talked a few moments," said Bailey, "before they told me, 'You've got the part.'"

Edd Byrnes was an equally easy find. Byrnes skyrocketed to fame as "Kookie" on the popular television series 77 Sunset Strip, and became typecast as a result. Orr was the one who'd originally cast Byrnes as Kookie, and Bare directed several episodes of the show.

The casting of Tiffany Bolling was an entirely different matter. In 1970, Bolling released an album titled Tiffany. The album didn't sell well and the company backing it went out of business, so Bolling continued her acting career. For the part of lounge singer Lisa James, the filmmakers needed someone who could both act and sing. "My singing was one thing that helped me get the part in Wicked, Wicked," Bolling said.

=== Filming, editing and release ===
The movie was filmed at the historic Hotel del Coronado over the span of 48 days and came in under its $1.5 million budget. Bare estimated that the time and expense was double what it would have been for a normal, single-screen film. At the time of the film's release, Tiffany Bolling commented, "Wicked, Wicked was a fun film to make... and I loved the duo-vision process." Decades later she recanted, saying the film "really got to be a joke," because it was cheap and poorly made, "but I loved singing in the movie."

Bare recognized before he began shooting that audiences would have a hard time following the movie if there was too much action playing on both sides of the screen simultaneously, and he scripted a few single-screen segments "for shock value."

Editing the film proved to be a daunting task. Edited on a double-headed Moviola, it "took 32 weeks to finish the rough cut," said Bare, "compared with 6 weeks for the average picture." "I also had to shoot 3,000 more feet of film in order to fill a void on one of the screens."

Initially Bare and MGM planned to release the movie as two separate films, to be shown by two interlocked projectors on a wide theater screen, but they ultimately decided that a single piece of film would give them a larger market, so they squeezed both images onto 35mm, projected at a unique 2.65:1 aspect ratio. They also made the highly unusual (at the time) decision to release the film in stereo, with the left and right speakers emitting dialogue "from the proper side of the screen."

== Reception ==
Critical reaction was split, with many critics unable to grasp the film's mixture of horror, suspense and comedy. "It's high camp," Bare stated. "Nobody can take it seriously. We call it half Grand Hotel and half Grand Guignol."

Doug Thompson wrote, "The script by Bare is trite and so filled with typical screen stereotypes and clichés that it is almost comical. His direction is erratic and sloppy and acting by the principals is appalling." Mike Meserole commented, "As with the split screen, Duo-Vision is geared more for action than acting, which is fortunate because Wicked, Wicked has plenty of the former and none of the latter." Barbara Bladen wrote, "It works to keep your mind off the mindlessness of the script until the [split-screen] novelty wears off," and then she concluded, "There may be laughs to be had for someone with a strong stomach for blood but the graphic vision of the film's more grisly scenes quite choked them back on me."

Other reviews of the film were more positive. New York Times critic Roger Greenspun called it "an oddly pleasant movie" in which "everybody is likable." Leon Flemming praised Madelaine Sherwood, calling her "appealingly grotesque as a down-and-out hoofer who lives on very precarious credit at the hotel," before concluding, "Wicked, Wicked should be seen with tongue-in-cheek, the same spirit in which it was created." Gary W. Stratton said the film was "better than average" with "credible" acting, and he called the reveal of the killer's motivation "the best part," but like most every film critic - whether they liked the movie or hated it - he pointedly added to his review, "most of the time the double picture does not add to the film."

Director Richard L. Bare wrote in his autobiography, "The college students were unanimous in their praise, but the picture opened quietly, played a while, and then disappeared." According to Bare, the film received minuscule promotion because MGM owner Kirk Kerkorian was draining the company's funds to build a Las Vegas casino.

Orr and Bare planned to follow up Wicked, Wicked with another Duo-Vision thriller titled October Incident which would have dealt with a plot to assassinate Fidel Castro, but since Duo-Vision was poorly received, plans for the film were abandoned.

After its theatrical run, Wicked, Wicked fell into obscurity, and Bolling eventually removed it from her résumé. "They can’t do anything with it," she said. "They can’t put it on home video, because you can’t see it on TV, the screen is so small, so it just totally was a bust." In the 21st century, however, television airings were no longer a problem. The film debuted on Turner Classic Movies' cult movie showcase TCM Underground in 2008 (paired with the 1972 Alfred Hitchcock thriller Frenzy) and went on to air in heavy rotation on the network.

== Home media ==
The film was released on VHS in Finland and Germany.

On October 28, 2014, the movie was released as a burn-on-demand DVD-R through Warner Archive. The movie underwent an extensive two-year restoration which was described as akin to "restoring two separate films," it's presented in a 2.40:1 aspect ratio and boasts a stereo soundtrack and the trailer as a sole extra.

== See also ==
- List of American films of 1973
- Hyperlink cinema
