= Sharpe's Eagle (TV programme) =

1993 film

- Based on: Sharpe's Eagle by Bernard Cornwell
- Directed by: Tom Clegg
- Starring: Sean Bean; Brian Cox; Daragh O'Malley; Assumpta Serna
- Theme music composer: Dominic Muldowney; John Tams
- Country of origin: United Kingdom
- Original language: English

Production
- Running time: 100 minutes

Original release
- Network: ITV
- Release: 12 May 1993

Related
- Sharpe's Rifles; Sharpe's Company

Sharpe's Eagle is a historical war television drama, the second episode in the first series of Sharpe, based on the 1981 novel of the same name. Shown on ITV in 1993, the adaptation stars Sean Bean, Brian Cox, Daragh O'Malley and Assumpta Serna.

== Plot summary ==
In 1809, Sir Arthur Wellesley, commander of the British forces in the Iberian Peninsula, prepares to invade French-controlled Spain. He orders Lieutenant Richard Sharpe and his band of "chosen men" to accompany the arrogant, incompetent, newly arrived Sir Henry Simmerson and his South Essex Regiment on a mission to destroy a bridge vital to French troop movements. Simmerson, his nephew Lieutenant Gibbons and toady, Lieutenant Berry despise Sharpe for his low birth. However, Major Lennox, who knows Sharpe from their days in India, and Virginian, Captain Leroy appreciate his military expertise. Seeing the South Essex suffer abuse under Simmerson, Sharpe trains the regiment to improve their shooting.

The bridge is taken without resistance and Sharpe's men start to place explosives. When Simmerson spots a small French patrol on the other side of the river, he orders Lennox to take a small detachment and drive them off. Lennox strenuously objects, but obeys the command. His fears are realised when a hidden French cavalry unit overruns the British; Lennox is fatally wounded and the King's colours are lost. Sharpe and his chosen men come to the rescue, while Simmerson panics and orders the bridge to be blown up, even though some of his men are still on the other side. Afterwards, the dying Lennox asks Sharpe for a French Imperial Eagle to wash away the shame of losing the colours.

Wellesley admonishes Simmerson for his incompetence in losing the colours and Lennox's death. Wellesley stands down the South Essex but places Light Company under Sharpe's command. Wellesley also promotes Sharpe to captain for his part in the skirmish, instead of Gibbons (though he cannot guarantee that Sharpe will be able to keep his new rank). Enraged, Simmerson tells Berry to dispose of Sharpe. Berry deliberately provokes Sharpe by whipping Countess Josefina, a woman Sharpe had rescued from Gibbons and taken under his protection. Sharpe challenges Berry to a duel the following dawn, despite Wellesley's standing orders of duels being banned. To prevent the duel from happening, Wellesley orders a night patrol to be led by Sharpe and Berry. They run into the French; during the firefight, Berry shoots Sharpe from behind, but is killed by Harper before he can finish the job.

The next day, the Battle of Talavera is fought. Simmerson, seeing a French column approaching his position, predictably flees. Sharpe steadies the South Essex, much improved by his training, and leaves them under the command of Leroy. They succeed in stopping the French attack. At just the right moment, Sharpe and his riflemen flank the wavering French soldiers sending them into a full on rout. Sharpe captures the unit's Eagle, making him famous throughout Britain and ensuring that he remains a captain.

Afterwards, Sharpe plants the Eagle on Lennox's grave. Simmerson is protected by his influential friends and escapes punishment, losing command of the regiment to Sir William Lawford. Meanwhile, Josefina finds a new protector in Captain Leroy.

== Cast ==
- Sean Bean as Sharpe
- Brian Cox as Hogan
- Daragh O'Malley as Harper
- Assumpta Serna as Teresa
- Michael Cochrane as Sir Henry Simmerson
- David Troughton as Wellesley
- Martin Jacobs as Lawford
- Katia Caballero as Josefina
- Michael Mears as Cooper
- John Tams as Hagman
- Jason Salkey as Harris
- Paul Trussell as Tongue
- Lyndon Davies as Perkins
- Gavan O'Herlihy as Leroy
- David Ashton as Lennox
- Neil Dudgeon as Gibbons
- Daniel Craig as Berry
- Nolan Hemmings as Denny
- Paul Bigley as Dobbs

It was David Troughton's second and last appearance as Sir Arthur Wellesley; who was subsequently played by Hugh Fraser. Brian Cox would also leave the series after this episode. He was replaced by Michael Byrne playing a different character. Paul Trussell's character of Isaiah Tongue does not appear in later episodes.

== Differences from the novel ==
While both the novel and the film follow a similar plot, many of the characters and events are altered from the former, often in order to minimise production costs. An incomplete list follows:

- In the novel, Sharpe brings with him a force of thirty riflemen to the South Essex, who remain with him throughout the course of the books. In the film, this number is trimmed down significantly, as only the Chosen Men and Sgt Harper are featured.
- The character of Teresa had yet to be introduced by the time Sharpe's Eagle was written, appearing in the subsequent Sharpe's Gold. In the film, Teresa is present throughout many events of the plot, and the relationship between Sharpe and Josefina is scrapped as a result.
- The character of Captain Thomas Leroy is significantly different in the film, adding in a subplot that he made his fortune as a slave-trader. The Leroy in the novel has no connection with slave-trading.
- The bridge at Valdelacasa is an old Roman stone bridge in the novel, rather than the wooden one in the film. The battle that takes place there is also heavily altered; the Spanish take no part in the fighting, the battle between the South Essex and the French dragoons is of a much smaller scale, with only a few dozen men participating rather than hundreds on each side, and Sharpe's capture of the French cannon was written out.
- In the book, Gibbons is killed by Harper at Talavera when he attacks Sharpe, whereas in the film he flees with Simmerson and survives. The death of Berry in the film is an amalgamation of the deaths of Gibbons and Berry from the book: The novel has Sharpe luring Berry off to a secluded spot under the cover of a French attack and stabbing him through the throat with his sword.
