= Busting Loose (TV series) =

- Title card, with Adam Arkin as Lenny Markowitz at right.
- Genre: Sitcom
- Created by: Lowell Ganz; Mark Rothman
- Starring: Adam Arkin
- Theme music composer: Mark Rothman
- Country of origin: United States
- Original language: English
- No. of seasons: 2
- No. of episodes: 25 (4 unaired)

Production
- Executive producers: Lowell Ganz; Mark Rothman
- Producers: Lawrence Kasha (Season One); John Thomas Lenox (Season 2)
- Running time: 30 minutes
- Production companies: Hayadou Productions; Paramount Television

Original release
- Network: CBS
- Release: January 17 – November 16, 1977

Busting Loose is an American sitcom starring Adam Arkin which centers on a young man in New York City who has moved out of his parents' house to live on his own for the first time. The show aired on CBS between January 17, 1977, and November 16, 1977.

== Synopsis ==
Twenty-four-year-old Jewish American Lenny Markowitz has recently graduated from engineering school, though his true aspiration is to be a sportscaster. Tired of his overprotective and meddling parents Sam and Pearl, he secretly moves out on his own for the first time — hence "busting loose" — into an inexpensive apartment in a rundown tenement in New York City. Lacking the money to even replace the duck-covered wallpaper in his new place and unable to find an engineering job, Lenny temporarily takes a job at the Wearwell Shoe Store owned by Ralph Cabell and befriends his co-worker Raymond St. Williams, a "hip" African American man.

Lenny's childhood friends — Lester Bellman, Allan Simmonds, Vinnie Mordabito, and Woody Warshaw — frequently hang out with him at his place, where they play poker together and get involved in various escapades. He becomes close friends with his neighbor Melody Feebeck, a tall and very attractive older redhead who works for an escort service.

While Lenny is unlucky finding an engineering job, he is also unlucky in love. In season 1 he dates several different girls, and even goes out on a date with Melody. By season 2 he manages to find a regular girlfriend, an attractive girl named Jackie Gleason (no relation to, and who bears no resemblance to, the real-life TV and film star Jackie Gleason).

== Cast and characters ==
- Adam Arkin as Lenny Markowitz
- Barbara Rhoades as Melody Feebeck
- Jack Kruschen as Sam Markowitz
- Pat Carroll as Pearl Markowitz
- Danny Goldman as Lester Bellman
- Steve Nathan as Allan Simmonds
- Greg Antonacci as Vinnie Mordabito
- Paul Sylvan as Woody Warshaw
- Paul B. Price as Ralph Cabell
- Ralph Wilcox as Raymond St. Williams
- Louise Williams as Jackie Gleason

== Production notes ==
Mark Rothman and Lowell Ganz created Busting Loose and served as its executive producers, and Rothman composed the show's theme music. Lawrence Kasha was the producer for the first season; John Thomas Lenox produced the second season. Lenox also directed one episode; the other episode directors were Greg Antonacci, James Burrows, Mel Ferber, Norm Gray, Asaad Kelada, Harvey Miller, Tony Mordente, Alan Myerson, Bill Persky, Howard Storm, and Joel Zwick. Antonacci, Ganz, Rothman, Chet Dowling, David W. Duclon, Howard Gewirtz, Joe Glauberg, Sandy Krinski, David Lerner, Deborah Leschin, Babaloo Mandel, and Barry Rubinowitz all wrote or co-wrote one or more episodes.

During its first season, Busting Loose aired on CBS on Monday at 8:30 p.m. from January to May 1977. The show then left the air until July 1977, when reruns of the first season began to air on Wednesday at 8:30 p.m. The second season also ran at 8:30 p.m. on Wednesday in the fall of 1977.

In "Mr. Dennis Steps Out," broadcast on October 26, 1977, as the fifth episode of the second season of Busting Loose, Melody is afraid that her boss at the escort service, Roger Dennis – played by guest star Ted Knight – is going to fire her. The episode served as the pilot for Knight's first show of his own, the short-lived 1978 sitcom The Ted Knight Show, which centered on Roger Dennis's firm, the Mr. Dennis Escort Service. However, Barbara Rhoades and her Melody Feebeck character did not appear in The Ted Knight Show.

== Episodes ==
Busting Loose was broadcast over two seasons. Thirteen episodes aired during its first season in the winter and spring of 1977. Eight more were broadcast during its second season in the fall of 1977, and four other episodes produced for that season never aired.

=== Season 1 (1977) ===
No. overall	No. in season	Title	Directed by	Written by	Original release date	Prod. code
1	1	"Pilot"	Bill Persky	Lowell Ganz & Mark Rothman	January 17, 1977	001
Tired of living with his meddling and overprotective parents, Lenny tells them that he is going on a trip and secretly searches for a cheap apartment.
2	2	"Five's a Crowd"	Howard Storm	Barry Rubinowitz	January 24, 1977	002
Lenny has a crush on a girl who is paranoid about male attention.
3	3	"The Harder They Come, the Bigger They Fall"	James Burrows	Greg Antonacci	February 7, 1977	005
A bullying deliveryman challenges Lenny to a fight.
4	4	"Still Nutsy After All These Years"	James Burrows	Deborah Leschin & David W. Duclon	February 14, 1977	004
Lenny's ex-girlfriend tries to rekindle their relationship.
5	5	"Grandpa Markowitz"	Harvey Miller	Mark Rothman & Lowell Ganz	February 21, 1977	007
Lenny's grandfather comes to visit. He hates his relatives and plans to shock them by dropping dead at his own 85th birthday party. (Adam's real-life father Alan Arkin plays his grandfather in this episode.)
6	6	"Hell Hath No Fury"	Norm Gray	Barry Rubinowitz	February 28, 1977	008
Lenny refuses to let Helene move in with him, so she has him jailed on trumped-up charges.
7	7	"Love's Labor Lost"	Asaad Kelada	Joe Glauberg	March 7, 1977	006
Lenny is determined to date a girl whose father disapproves of him.
8	8	"Kiss and Dwell"	Tony Mordente	Deborah Leschin	March 14, 1977	010
Lenny's friends goad him into asking Melody for a date.
9	9	"A Nut at the Opera"	Tony Mordente	Greg Antonacci	March 21, 1977	011
Working as escorts, Lenny and a friend accompany two socialites to the opera.
10	10	"House of Noodles"	Tony Mordente	Babaloo Mandel	March 28, 1977	012
Mr. Cabell refuses to give Raymond a raise.
11	11	"Together Again as Never Before"	James Burrows	Greg Antonacci	April 11, 1977	003
Sam is lonely while Pearl is away, and he makes a pest of himself trying to be Lenny's pal.
12	12	"The Famous Announcers School"	Tony Mordente	Chet Dowling & Sandy Krinski	April 25, 1977	009
Aspiring to be a sportscaster, Lenny enrolls in a fly-by-night broadcasting school run by a flaky disc jockey.
13	13	"Singles Weekend"	Tony Mordente	David W. Duclon	May 2, 1977	013
Lenny and his friends visit a resort, seeking sun, fun, and women.

=== Season 2 (1977) ===
No. overall	No. in season	Title	Directed by	Written by	Original release date	Prod. code
14	1	"Smoke Gets in Your Face"	James Burrows	Barry Rubinowitz	September 28, 1977	014
Lenny blames his friends for a fire that damaged his apartment.
15	2	"Foiled Again"	Alan Myerson	Greg Antonacci	October 5, 1977	016
Vinnie is in love, but his state of bliss comes to an end when the woman he is interested in falls for Lenny.
16	3	"Roomies"	Mel Ferber	Babaloo Mandel	October 12, 1977	015
Vinnie and Raymond are both looking for an apartment, and they find the same one.
17	4	"A Knight in Tarnished Armor"	Norm Gray	Babaloo Mandel	October 19, 1977	017
Lenny is a meek man at heart, but he nonetheless tries to impress Jackie with his machismo.
18	5	"Mr. Dennis Steps Out"	James Burrows	Lowell Ganz & Mark Rothman	October 26, 1977	022
Melody fears that her boss at the escort service, Roger Dennis, is going to fire her. Guest star: Ted Knight. This episode was the pilot for the 1978 sitcom The Ted Knight Show.
19	6	"The Decision: Part 1"	John Thomas Lenox	David W. Duclon	November 2, 1977	018
Lenny becomes angry when he spots Jackie out with another man.
20	7	"The Decision: Part 2"	John Thomas Lenox	Howard Gewirtz & David Lerner	November 9, 1977	019
Lenny tries to choose between playing around with women and settling down.
21	8	"All in Love's Unfair"	Unknown	Unknown	November 16, 1977	024
Lenny sets up Vinnie with a girl he once dated who is still sweet on him.
22	9	"Welcome to Fleckman's"	N/A	N/A	Unaired	020
23	10	"Mordabito's Ragtime Band"	N/A	N/A	Unaired	021
24	11	"Camp Sha-Man-Ga"	N/A	N/A	Unaired	023
25	12	"Scenes from an Engagement"	N/A	N/A	Unaired	025
