= The New Odd Couple =

American sitcom

- Genre: Sitcom
- Based on: The Odd Couple by Neil Simon
- Developed by: Garry K. Marshall
- Written by: Lowell Ganz; Mark Rothman; Millee Taggart; Kurt Taylor
- Directed by: Joel Zwick; John Tracy
- Starring: Ron Glass; Demond Wilson; John Schuck; Bart Braverman; Jo Marie Payton; Liz Torres
- Theme music composer: Neal Hefti
- Composers: Dan Foliart; Howard Pearl
- Country of origin: United States
- Original language: English
- No. of seasons: 1
- No. of episodes: 18

Production
- Executive producers: Garry Marshall; Anthony W. Marshall
- Running time: 22–24 minutes
- Production companies: Henderson Production Company Inc. Paramount Television

Original release
- Network: ABC
- Release: October 29, 1982 – May 26, 1983

Related
- The Odd Couple

The New Odd Couple is an American sitcom television series that aired on ABC from 1982 to 1983, and was an updated version of the 1970s television series The Odd Couple. The New Odd Couple was the second TV series to be based on one of Neil Simon's plays with African-American actors playing the lead roles; the first was Barefoot in the Park (which premiered on September 24, 1970, the same day as the original Odd Couple series).

== Synopsis ==
In this series, Felix Unger and Oscar Madison were both African-American college buddies who met in the 1950s. Felix was portrayed by Ron Glass and Oscar was portrayed by Demond Wilson. The characterizations were still the same, as Felix was a prissy neatfreak and Oscar was a fun-loving and sloppy character. John Schuck also appeared as Murray the Cop, who was kept Caucasian, as was the character of Roy, who was played by Bart Braverman.

The show ran for eighteen episodes. When production on the series began, a Hollywood writers strike was underway; as a result, eight of the early episodes recycled scripts from the original series. By the time the writers began producing new scripts, it was too late, as the show never found an audience. The series was cancelled in 1983.

== Cast ==
- Ron Glass as Felix Unger
- Demond Wilson as Oscar Madison
- John Schuck as Officer Murray Greshler
- Sheila Anderson as Cecily Pigeon
- Ronalda Douglas as Gwendolyn Pigeon
- Bart Braverman as Roy
- Liz Torres as Maria
- Jo Marie Payton as Mona
- Telma Hopkins as Frances Unger
- Christopher Joy as Speed
- Marvin Braverman as Vinnie

== Production ==
The New Odd Couple was executive produced by Garry and Anthony W. Marshall, and produced by Paramount Television. The theme music was still the same as the original series (composed by Neal Hefti), but it was played with a more updated urban arrangement.

This marked the second time Ron Glass and Demond Wilson collaborated; nearly a decade prior, they appeared together in two episodes of Sanford and Son: "Card Sharps" (S2, E6) and "Once a Thief" (S4, E15).

== Episodes ==
No.	Title	Directed by	Written by	Original release date
1	"The Ides of April"	Joel Zwick	Lowell Ganz & Mark Rothman	October 29, 1982
Felix receives a letter from the IRS. While correcting the error at the IRS office, he accidentally gives away the information about Oscar's tax violations. Felix helps Oscar with his backlogged taxes and saves the day.
2	"The Hustler"	Joel Zwick	Lowell Ganz & Mark Rothman	November 5, 1982
Oscar is suckered into a contest with a pool hustler.
3	"Frances Moves In"	Joel Zwick	Lowell Ganz & Mark Rothman	November 12, 1982
Felix' ex-wife moves in, interrupting the weekly poker game.
4	"That Was No Lady"	Joel Zwick	Lee Kalcheim	November 19, 1982
Felix falls for the girlfriend of a boxing great, KO'ing Oscar's hopes of writing a book on the champion.
5	"Brother, Can You Spare a Job?"	Joel Zwick	Jerry Ross	November 26, 1982
At Felix' prodding, Oscar demands a raise and is immediately promoted into the ranks of the unemployed.
6	"The New Car"	Joel Zwick	Lowell Ganz & Mark Rothman	December 3, 1982
In this episode, Felix and Oscar win a car. The car becomes a problem when the two are forced to take turns getting up early to move it across the street. Problems are made worse when Felix refuses to let Oscar drive the car for fear that something will happen to it. Eventually they decide to get rid of the car so that it does not come between their friendship.
7	"The Cordon Blues"	Joel Zwick	Jeffrey Duteil & Ralph Farquhar	December 10, 1982
A socialite friend thinks Felix has the panache to manage her new restaurant.
8	"The Odd Triangle"	Joel Zwick	Norman Barasch	December 17, 1982
Felix suspects the model Oscar is dating is using his roommate to get to Felix—and his influence as a fashion photographer.
9	"Opening Night"	John Tracy	Mary Cory Miller & Kurt Taylor	December 31, 1982
Felix helps Oscar review a Broadway play whose backer insists on a favorable notice—or else.
10	"Security"	Joel Zwick	Jerry Belson	January 7, 1983
In the aftermath of a robbery, Felix gets a guard dog and looks for an apartment with tighter security.
11	"Bachelor of the Year"	Joel Zwick	Mark C. Miller & Kurt Taylor	January 14, 1983
Felix and Oscar are pitted against each other in a magazine's Man of the Year contest.
12	"A Grave for Felix"	Joel Zwick	Dick Bensfield & Perry Grant	January 21, 1983
The money Felix entrusts to Oscar for a cemetery-plot deposit becomes ready cash for Oscar's gambling.
13	"My Strife in Court"	Joel Zwick	Lowell Ganz & Mark Rothman	January 28, 1983
Oscar can't find a date for a concert, so Felix gets them both arrested for scalping at the door.
14	"Oscar Dates Felix's Frances"	Joel Zwick	Stu Silver	February 18, 1983
Oscar agrees to accompany Felix' ex-wife to a boring lecture. The unexpected happens when Oscar and Frances decide to begin dating.
15	"Murray's Hot Date"	Joel Zwick	Madeline Sunshine & Steven Sunshine	February 25, 1983
Oscar gives the household money to Charity—a prostitute he hires as Murray's date for the civil servant.
16	"The Perils of Pauline"	Joel Zwick	Jeffrey Duteil & Barry O'Brien	May 13, 1983
Oscar's pals surprise him with a word processor, but Oscar can't compose without "Pauline" - his trusty typewriter.
17	"The Only Way to Fly"	Joel Zwick	Madeline Sunshine & Steven Sunshine	May 20, 1983
Murray's palm reading points to bad luck down the line for Felix, beginning with Oscar ruining his roommate's chances to enter a photo exhibition.
18	"The Night Stalker"	Joel Zwick	Ralph Farquhar	May 26, 1983
A crazed man throws a brick through Felix' studio window, and it's wrapped with a message threatening Felix for dating his wife.

== US TV Ratings ==
Season	Episodes	Start date	End date	Nielsen rank	Nielsen rating
1982-83	18	October 29, 1982	May 26, 1983	60	N/A

== Syndication ==
Reruns of the series aired on BET in the early 1990s. TV Land occasionally aired reruns when they were airing reruns of the original 1970s series.
