= Randolph Roberts =

American actor

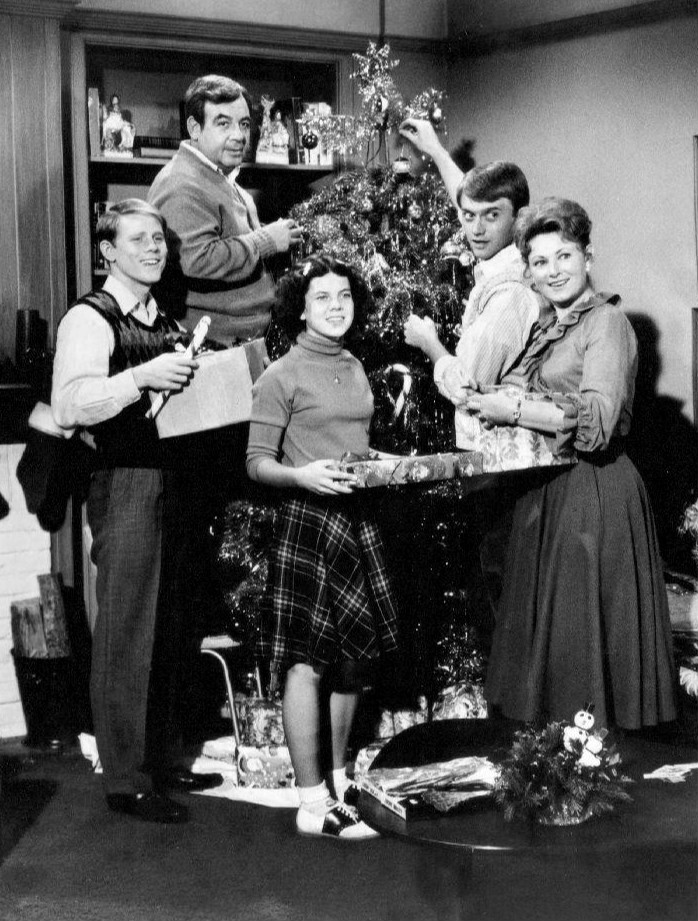
- Cast of Happy Days (1974). L-R: Ron Howard, Tom Bosley, Erin Moran, Randolph Roberts, and Marion Ross
- Born: October 5, 1947 (age 78); Fresno, California, U.S.
- Occupation: Actor
- Years active: 1973–1986

Randolph Roberts (born October 5, 1947), also known as Will Roberts, is an American actor best known for being the second actor (after Gavan O'Herlihy) to portray Richie Cunningham's older brother Chuck on two episodes of Happy Days.

Gavan O'Herlihy played Chuck Cunningham in 9 episodes of season 1 and the role was recast with Randolph Roberts for season 2. Roberts played Chuck starting in season 2's first episode "Richie Moves Out" and ending with "Guess Who's Coming to Christmas". Chuck was not seen again but was later mentioned in a few other episodes ending with "Fish and the Fins" later in the season. After that, Chuck was written off the show completely with later episodes depicting the Cunningham family with only two children with Richie as the elder. The character gave rise to the pejorative term "Chuck Cunningham Syndrome", referring to characters who disappear from TV-shows without an In-Universe explanation and are later retconned to have never existed.

Roberts also landed the leading role in Wicked, Wicked (1973), guest starred on Gunsmoke (1974) and played a minor role in Logan's Run (1976). The filming of Guess Who’s Coming to Christmas, one of the props on the scene gave Roberts a black eye.

Roberts eventually sidelined his acting career and became an education supervisor for ITT Technical Institute in San Diego.
