= Joel Zwick =

American director (born 1942)

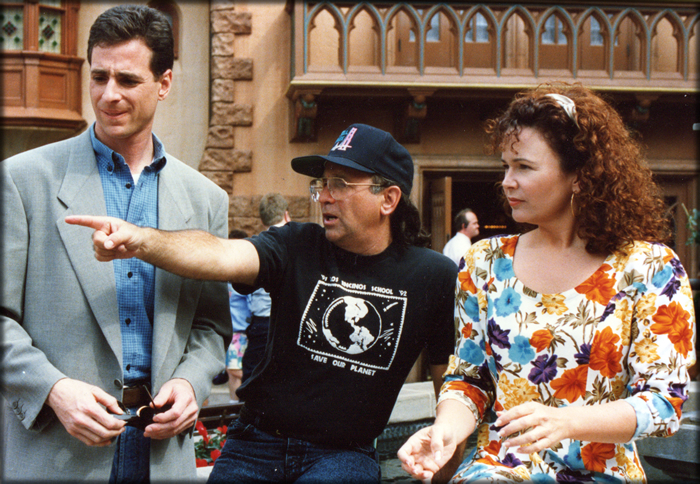
- Directing Bob Saget & Gail Edwards "The House Meets the Mouse" Full House
- Born: Joel Rudolf Zwick; January 11, 1942 (age 84); New York City, New York, U.S.
- Education: Brooklyn College
- Occupations: Film director, television director, theater director
- Years active: 1977–present
- Spouse: Candice Zwick
- Children: 4

Joel Rudolf Zwick (born January 11, 1942) is an American film director, television director, and theater director. He worked on the television series Perfect Strangers, Full House, and Family Matters, and directed the films My Big Fat Greek Wedding, Second Sight, and Fat Albert.

== Biography ==
Zwick was born in Brooklyn, New York to a Jewish family. His father was a cantor from an Orthodox background, and Zwick had his bar mitzvah at an Orthodox synagogue.

He graduated from James Madison High School in 1958. Zwick then went to Brooklyn College ('62), where he taught in the School of Film.

Zwick has directed 21 television pilots, all of which have continued on to successful runs as weekly series.

He is married to Dr. Candice Zwick, a psychologist. They have three daughters, Hillary, Jodi and Lara, and one son, Jamie. Despite a popular misconception, he is not related to fellow filmmaker Edward Zwick.

== Television ==
- Busting Loose (1977)
- Insight (1978)
- Mork & Mindy (1978)
- The Ted Knight Show (1978)
- Makin' It (1979)
- Goodtime Girls (1980)
- Laverne & Shirley (1978–1980)
- It's a Living (1980–1981)
- Bosom Buddies (1980–1982)
- Joanie Loves Chachi (1982)
- The New Odd Couple (1982)
- Brothers (1984–1985)
- Webster (1983–1986)
- Perfect Strangers (1986–1992)
- On Our Own (1994)
- The Wayans Bros. (1995)
- Full House (1987–1995)
- Kirk (1995)
- The Parent 'Hood (1995)
- Step by Step (1992–1996)
- Hangin' with Mr. Cooper (1992–1997)
- Meego (1997)
- Family Matters (1989–1998)
- The Jamie Foxx Show (1998)
- Love Boat: The Next Wave (1999)
- Two of a Kind (1999)
- Two and a Half Men (2008)
- The Suite Life on Deck (2010–2011)
- Pair of Kings (2010–2011)
- Good Luck Charlie (2010–2011)
- I'm in the Band (2010–2011)
- Shake It Up (2010–2013)
- Dog with a Blog (2013-2015)
- Jessie (2013-2014)
- Girl Meets World (2014-2017)
- Richie Rich (2015)
- K.C. Undercover (2015–2018)
- Fuller House (2016)

== Film ==
- Second Sight (1989)
- My Big Fat Greek Wedding (2002)
- Elvis Has Left the Building (2004)
- Fat Albert (2004)

== Broadway ==
- Shenandoah (national tour)
- Dance with Me (1975; musical; Tony Award nomination)
- Esther (Promenade Theater, New York City)
- George Gershwin, Alone (2001; one-man show; Helen Hayes Theater)
- Back From Broadway (2002; benefit concert at Lincoln Center)

== Theater ==
Zwick was active in the Off-Off-Broadway movement at La MaMa Experimental Theatre Club, which was founded by Ellen Stewart in 1961. He worked with the La MaMa Plexus company at the East Village theater and on tour both domestically and internationally. He performed with La MaMa Plexus in Jan Quackenbush's Inside Out in 1968. He also directed the following productions at La MaMa:

- The Last Chance Saloon (1969)
- Woyzeck (1969)
- Spring-Voices (1969)
- Dance Wi Me (1971)
- The Myths of America Smith or Pappy Crumb's Treefrog Beer (1973)
- The Last Chance Saloon (1973)
- Calm Down Mother and The Gloaming, Oh My Darling (1974)
- Dance Wi' Me (1974)
- The Myths of America Smith and His Son (1975)
- Dance With Me (1975)

He was stage manager for the original 1967 production of MacBird!, and has directed the following theater productions:

- Oklahoma (national tour)
- Cold Storage (American Place Theater)
- Merry-Go-Round (Chicago and Las Vegas)
- Last Chance Saloon (West End, London)
- Woycek (West End, London)
- Carry A. Nation (Triangle Theater)
- George Gershwin, Alone (one-man show; Los Angeles, London; Ford's Theater in Washington, Chicago, West Palm Beach, Old Globe Theatre in San Diego, South Korea, etc.)
- Monsieur Chopin (one-man show)
- Beethoven, As I Knew Him (one-man show)
- Maestro: The Art of Leonard Bernstein (one-man show)
- Jamaica Farewell (one-woman show)
- Serrano

== Teaching ==
- Brooklyn College
- Queens College, City University of New York
- University of Southern California
- Wheaton College (Massachusetts)
- Yale University
