= Camp White Pine =

Summer camp in Haliburton, Ontario, Canada

Coordinates: 45.07657°N 78.5981°W

Camp White Pine is a traditional summer camp for boys and girls aged 7 to 16, located in Haliburton, Ontario. The camp was built in 1956 on the site of the old Highland Lodge. Founded by Joseph Kronick, In 1986, Joe's son Adam assumed leadership of the camp, later to be joined by his wife Dana.

Old map given on visitors day for coming to White Pine

Activities include swimming, water-skiing, sailing, windsurfing, fitness, pottery, glass, copper, arts and crafts, canoeing, tennis, ropes, land sports (including in-line hockey and basketball), drama, mountain biking, woodworking, mini-golf, school of rock, media arts and outdoor recreation. The camp also offers a wide variety of overnight and day trips, including canoe trips, sail trips, biking trips, tennis tour, and intercamp sports.

There are many special activities planned throughout the summer, whether it be camp-wide dances, the All-Day program or the Midnight Special.

Campers are divided into age groups, or "Sections" each with its own unique animal name. These are Kiwis, Koalas, Blue Dolphins, Red Dolphins, Gnus and the Training Village (TVs). These names were parodied by Bill Murray in the 1979 film Meatballs, which was filmed at the camp.

== Location ==
Camp White Pine is found in Haliburton, Ontario. The camp is on Hurricane Lake (goes by Lake Placid).

== Notable former campers ==
- Writer Margaret Atwood
- Filmmaker Beryl Fox
- Artist Charles Pachter
- Writer Rick Salutin
- Television writer David Shore

== Popular culture ==
Camp White Pine was featured in the 1979 film Meatballs as the fictional Camp North Star.
