= Makin' It (song) =

- 7-inch cover art (The title’s fonts are from the television series)

Single by David Naughton
- B-side: "Still Makin' It" (Instrumental version)
- Released: March 1979
- Genre: Pop, disco
- Length: 3:11
- Label: RSO Records
- Songwriters: Freddie Perren and Dino Fekaris
- Producer: Freddie Perren

"Makin' It" is a 1979 disco song performed by David Naughton, his only musical release. It was the theme song for the television series Makin' It, in which Naughton starred. It was written by the successful songwriting team Freddie Perren and Dino Fekaris. It was released as both a 7-inch single and a 12-inch single, with an instrumental version of the song titled "Still Makin' It" as the B-side.

Early pressings of this record stated that it was from the Makin' It television show. Later pressings stated it was from the comedy film Meatballs starring Bill Murray.

"Makin' It" appeared in the top 40 of the Billboard Hot 100 chart for 16 weeks, and in the top 10 for five weeks. It debuted at #89 on March 31, peaking at #5 for two weeks, on July 21 and July 28. On Billboard's Disco Action Top 40 Chart, the song peaked at number 11 in its March 10, 1979, issue during its 17-week run.

== Chart performance ==
=== Weekly charts ===
Chart (1979)	Peak position
Australia (Kent Music Report)	57
Canada RPM Top Singles	11
Canada RPM Adult Contemporary	10
Canada (Dance/Urban)	4
US Billboard Hot 100	5
US Billboard Adult Contemporary	48
US Billboard Disco Top 80	11
UK Singles Chart	44

=== Year-end charts ===
Chart (1979)	Rank
U.S. Billboard Hot 100	14
Canada	99

== Use in other media ==
- The song appeared on the soundtrack of the comedy film Meatballs (1979)
- It appears in a 2017 television commercial for Subway, promoting an Autumn Carved Turkey sandwich
- It appears in the film Detroit Rock City.
- The song is used twice in season 1, episode 5 of Nirvanna the Band the Show at a slightly sped-up rate.
