= Mel Ferber =

- Born: October 2, 1922; New York City, New York, U.S.
- Died: June 19, 2003 (aged 80); Los Angeles, California, U.S.

Mel Ferber (October 2, 1922 – June 19, 2003) was an American television director and producer, who oversaw the live two-hour TV presentation of Wonderful Town and the pilot for 60 Minutes and other shows. Ferber was an executive producer of Good Morning America. He was a member of the Directors Guild of America.

== Biography ==
Ferber was born and raised in New York City, and was a graduate of City College of New York. He became a World War II hero when, after landing at Utah Beach, he and four other members of his unit captured 464 German soldiers and used their weapons to rearm a French battalion (earning him the Croix de Guerre with Silver Star). He entered the TV industry after he was discharged.

As a member of CBS, Ferber directed Wonderful Town, the first live two-hour show on TV, in 1958. Subsequently, he earned Emmy nominations for his work as executive producer and creator of Good Morning America and executive producer of CBS' Calendar. He produced the pilot of 60 Minutes and directed the pilot of Happy Days (plus two more episodes). The 1972 Democratic National Convention's TV and radio work was produced by Ferber as well.

Ferber also directed and/or produced many television shows, including Studio One, That Was the Week That Was, Walter Cronkite's 21st Century, National Geographic, The Odd Couple, McMillan & Wife, Alias Smith and Jones, The Mary Tyler Moore Show, Busting Loose, Archie Bunker's Place, Quincy, M.E., Alice, Diff'rent Strokes and many more.

Ferber died on June 19, 2003, in Los Angeles from heart failure.
