= David Naughton =

American actor and singer (born 1951)

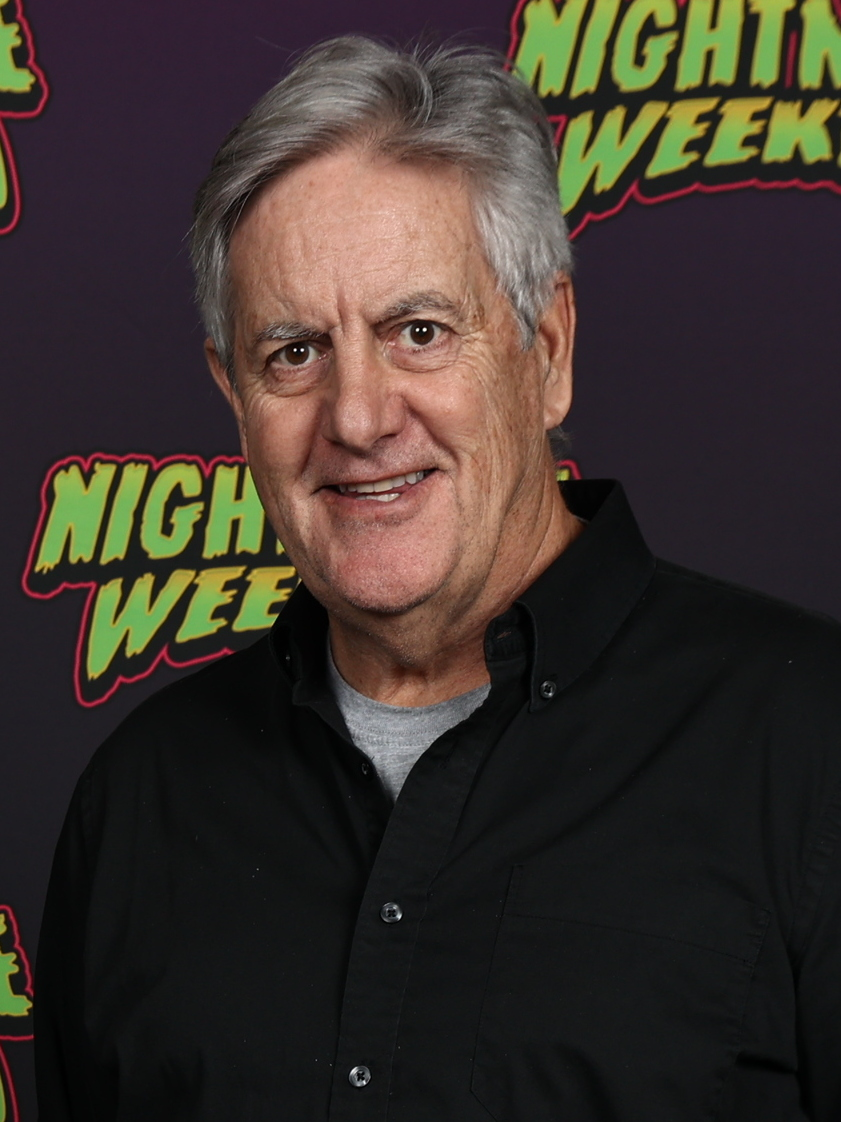
- Naughton at Nightmare Weekend Richmond in 2023
- Born: David Walsh Naughton; February 13, 1951 (age 75); West Hartford, Connecticut, U.S.
- Education: London Academy of Music and Dramatic Art; University of Pennsylvania
- Occupations: Actor, singer
- Years active: 1974–present
- Spouses: Denise Stephens (m. 1976; div. 1983); Deborah Dutton (m. 1985; div. 2005); Seann Sara Sella (m. 2007; div. 2009); Cheryl L Naughton (m. 2019)
- Children: 2
- Relatives: James Naughton (brother)

David Walsh Naughton (born February 13, 1951) is an American actor and singer. He is known for his starring roles in the Disney comedy Midnight Madness (1980) and the horror film An American Werewolf in London (1981), as well as for a long-running "Be a Pepper" ad campaign for beverage maker Dr Pepper. He also starred in the short-lived sitcom Makin' It and sang its hit theme song, giving him a Top 5 hit on the Billboard Hot 100.

== Early life and education ==
Naughton was born on February 13, 1951, in West Hartford, Connecticut, the son of Irish American parents Rosemary (née Walsh) and Joseph Naughton, both of whom were teachers. He is the younger of two boys; his older brother is actor James Naughton.

Naughton attended the University of Pennsylvania and the London Academy of Music and Dramatic Art. He earned a soccer scholarship to the University of Pennsylvania where he studied drama and graduated in 1973. He then moved to London to further his acting training. After two years in London, he moved to New York where he worked as a waiter and pursued his acting career.

== Career ==
Naughton's professional acting debut was in the New York Shakespeare Festival's production of Hamlet starring Sam Waterston. Naughton subsequently found steady work in various other local theater productions. He was an assistant stage manager and understudy for the Broadway production of Hugh Leonard's Da.

Naughton first became widely known as a result of his four-year stint (1977–1981) singing and dancing in television commercials and personal appearances to promote Dr Pepper. The commercials were considered creative and wildly popular. They involved Naughton dancing and singing in a Broadway musical style while handing out bottles of the beverage to people who then followed his lead Pied Piper style. The commercials won numerous Clio awards and involved a multitude of celebrities from Mickey Rooney and Jimmie Walker to Fred Flintstone and Popeye.

By 1981, Naughton was at the height of his success as a soft drink spokesperson but he wanted to try other ventures and decided to end his role in the commercials. Though the main commercial stint ended in 1981, Naughton occasionally returned to the pitchman role for the soft drink. In 1988, he did a commercial for Diet Dr. Pepper that was reminiscent of the earlier commercials. In 2010, Naughton joined a flash mob singing the iconic jingle at the New York Stock Exchange.

Naughton's popularity from the Dr Pepper commercials led to him being cast as the star of the sitcom Makin' It. In 1979, he also recorded the show's theme song, also titled "Makin' It.", which peaked at #5 on the Billboard Hot 100. A US million-selling disc, the track also peaked at #44 in the UK Singles Chart. The sitcom itself was less successful and lasted only nine episodes but his career continued to blossom. The next year, he starred in his first film, the Disney comedy Midnight Madness (1980).

Naughton then had a starring role in a higher-profile film: An American Werewolf in London (1981). The film was directed by John Landis, who had already made a name for himself with National Lampoon's Animal House (1978) and The Blues Brothers (1980). An American Werewolf in London was a comedy-horror film whose special effects and make-up (used to show the werewolf metamorphosis) were particularly innovative for their time. Rick Baker's make-up work won the inaugural Academy Award for Best Makeup at the 54th Academy Awards. The film was a critical and box-office hit.

After the success of An American Werewolf in London, Naughton continued to work steadily, but never regained the same level of success. He appeared in various lesser known movies, as well as smaller roles in numerous episodes of television shows including MacGyver, Melrose Place, Murder, She Wrote, JAG and Seinfeld.

From 1986 to 1988, Naughton had a recurring role on My Sister Sam as Jack Kincaid, the goofy ex-boyfriend of the series' main character Sam Russell (Pam Dawber). Naughton appeared in 19 episodes. The series had a strong first season but was cancelled due to low ratings in its second season. The following year, series co-star Rebecca Schaefer was murdered at her apartment by Robert John Bardo, a stalker who had pursued her for three years. In the wake of the tragedy, several actors from the sitcom including Naughton did a PSA to raise awareness of handgun violence.

== Personal life ==
Naughton has been married four times and divorced three times. In 2008, he was arrested for domestic violence in Henderson, Nevada.

== Filmography ==
=== Film ===
Year	Title	Role	Notes
1980	Midnight Madness	Adam Larson	
1981	Separate Ways	Jerry Lansing	
1981	An American Werewolf in London	David Kessler	
1984	Hot Dog…The Movie	Dan O'Callahan	
1984	Not for Publication	Barry Denver	
1986	The Boy in Blue	Bill	
1986	Separate Vacations	Richard Moore	
1987	Kidnapped	Vince McCarthy	
1988	Private Affairs	Mauro	
1990	The Sleeping Car	Jason McCree	
1990	Overexposed	Phillip	
1991	Steel and Lace	Dunn	
1993	Wild Cactus	Philip Marcus	
1993	Amityville: A New Generation	Dick Cutler	
1994	Desert Steel	Zach Gardener	
1994	Beanstalk	Mr. Ladd	
1994	Caribbean Kill	N/A	
1995	Ice Cream Man	Martin Cassera	
1995	The Adventures of Black Feather	Professeur Byrd	
1995	Mirror, Mirror III: The Voyeur	Detective Kobeck	
1996	Urban Safari	Joe	
2000	Little Insect	Buzz (voice)	
2001	A Crack in the Floor	EMT Driver	
2001	Flying Virus	Stephen North	
2003	Sky Blue	Commander Locke, Dr. Noah (voices)	English dub
2006	Big Bad Wolf	Sheriff Ruben	
2007	Brutal Massacre: A Comedy	Harry Penderecki	
2007	Hallows Point	Shopkeeper	
2009	Little Hercules in 3-D	Dwayne Harr	
2012	A Thousand Cuts	Alan	
2013	Cool as Hell	Clark	
2014	Psychotic State	Himself	
2017	Do It or Die	Herb Clough	
2017	The Hatred	Walter	
2022	Attack of the Killer Chickens: The Movie	President Robertson	
2023	Waking Nightmare	Dr. Doolin	

=== Television ===
Year	Title	Role	Notes
1974	Planet of the Apes	Dr. Stole	Episode: "The Surgeon"
1976	Muggsy	Danny Atwater	Episode: "Hit and Run"
1976	The Other Side of Victory	Michael Dooley	Television film
1979	Makin' It	Billy Manucci	9 episodes
1981	Fridays	Himself/Host	Episode: "David Naughton/Billy & the Beaters"
1982	I, Desire	David Balsiger	Television film
1983	The Love Boat	Edwin Winnaker	Episode: "Fountain of Youth/Bad Luck Cabin/Uncle Daddy"
1983	At Ease	Pfc. Tony Baker	14 episodes
1984	Getting Physical	Mickey Ritter	Television film
1986–88	My Sister Sam	Jack Kincaid	44 episodes
1988	Goddess of Love	Ted Beckman	Television film
1988	Murder, She Wrote	Ken Parrish	Episode: "Wearing of the Green"
1989	The Twilight Zone	John Sellig	Episode: "Special Service"
1991	The Belles of Bleeker Street	Chris	Episode: "Pilot"
1991	MacGyver	LaManna	Episode: "Honest Abe"
1991	Seinfeld	Dick	Episode: "The Red Dot"
1993	Body Bags	Pete	Television film
1993	Basic Values: Sex, Shock & Censorship in the 90's	Brad	Television film
1994	Diagnosis: Murder	Harry Gelson	Episode: "My Four Husbands"
1994–95	Turbocharged Thunderbirds	Scott Tracy, Virgil Tracy (voices)	8 episodes
1996	Melrose Place	Lou Chandler	Episode: "Run, Billy, Run"
1996	Touched by an Angel	Michael Russell	Episode: "Birthmarks"
1996	Bailey Kipper's P.O.V.	Norm Kipper	2 episodes
1997	Cybill	Andy	2 episodes
1998	Chance of a Lifetime	Art Haber	Television film
1998	Silk Stalkings	Max Behring	Episode: "Ramone, P.I."
1999	V.I.P.	Roy	Episode: "K-Val"
1999	Chicken Soup for the Soul	Paul Dinsman	Episode: "It's Never Too Late"
2000–01	JAG	Det. Grady	2 episodes
2001	ER	Ben Stevens	Episode: "Thy Will Be Done"
2001	Kate Brasher	Ames	Episode: "Tracy"
2001	Out of the Wilderness	Professor Byrd	Television film
2001	The Nightmare Room	Mr. Ryan	Episode: "Tangled Web"
2002	Justice League	The Streak (voice)	Episode: "Legends"
2005	Higglytown Heroes	Orchestra Conductor Hero (voice)	Episode: "Higgly Harmonies"
2005	Mystery Woman: Sing Me a Murder	Steven	Television film
2009	Psych	Ken Tucker	Episode: "Let's Get Hairy"
2010	Big Love	Mr. Usher	Episode: "Next Ticket Out"
2011	The Mentalist	Neurologist	Episode: "Fugue in Red"
2012	Major Crimes	State Senator McAustin	Episode: "The Shame Game"
2013	Grey's Anatomy	Nick Parker	Episode: "Transplant Wasteland"
2013	Holliston	Mark Ward	Episode: "Joe's Soda"
2013–15	Granite Flats	Millard Whittison	23 episodes
2015	American Horror Story	Mr. Samuels	Episode: "Mommy"
2017	Sharknado 5: Global Swarming	Ambassador Kessler	Television film
2018	SuperMansion	Himself (voice)	Episode: "Comicarnage"
2019	Rediscovering Christmas	Harry	Television film

=== Video games ===
Year	Title	Voice role	Notes
2005	Marc Eckō's Getting Up: Contents Under Pressure	Manfred	
2006	Marvel Ultimate Alliance	Mister Fantastic	
2016	Fallout 4: WRVR	Traveler	
2017	Saga of the Nine Worlds	Guard Captain	The Four Stags Collector's Edition
2018	Project Pro Skater	God	

== Partial stage credits ==
Year	Title	Role(s)	Venue	Notes
1975–76	Hamlet	Francisco, Player Queen, Ensemble member	Vivian Beaumont Theater, New York City	Understudy for Osric
1978–80	Da		Morosco Theatre, New York City	Assistant stage manager Understudy for Young Charlie Tynan
1982	Poor Little Lambs	Davey Weldman	Theatre at St. Peter's Church, New York City	
1985	Hair	Claude	Starlight Theatre, Kansas City	
1995	Happy Holidays	Joseph	Pasadena Playhouse, Pasadena	
1996	All I Really Need to Know I Learned in Kindergarten		Tiffany Theater, Los Angeles	
1997	John Brown's Body		Lobero Theatre, Santa Barbara	
1999	A Good Swift Kick		Variety Arts Theatre, New York City	
