= Coordinating Working Party on Fishery Statistics =

The Coordinating Working Party on Fishery Statistics (CWP) provides a mechanism to coordinate fishery statistical programmes of regional fishery bodies and other inter-governmental organizations with a remit for fishery statistics.

== Main function ==
Functional since 1960, the CWP's purpose is to:

- continually review fishery statistics requirements for research, policy-making and management;
- agree on standard concepts, definitions, classifications and methodologies for the collection and collation of fishery statistics;
- make proposals for the coordination and streamlining of statistical activities among relevant intergovernmental organizations.

== Legal framework ==
Established by resolution 23/59 of the FAO Conference under Article VI-2 of the Organization's Constitution at its Tenth Session in 1959. The Statutes of CWP were amended and approved by the FAO Council at its Hundred and Eighth Session in June 1995.

== Participating organizations ==
The CWP is composed of experts nominated by intergovernmental organizations which have a competence in fishery statistics. There are currently 17 participating organizations in the CWP:

- Commission for the Conservation of Antarctic Marine Living Resources (CCAMLR)
- Commission for the Conservation of Southern Bluefin Tuna (CCSBT)
- Food and Agriculture Organization of the United Nations (FAO)
- General Fisheries Commission for the Mediterranean (GFCM)
- Indian Ocean Tuna Commission (IOTC)
- Inter-American Tropical Tuna Commission
- International Commission for the Conservation of Atlantic Tunas (ICCAT)
- International Council for the Exploration of the Sea (ICES)
- International Whaling Commission (IWC)
- North Atlantic Salmon Conservation Organization (NASCO)
- North East Atlantic Fisheries Commission (NEAFC)
- Northwest Atlantic Fisheries Organization (NAFO)
- Organisation for Economic Cooperation and Development (OECD)
- Secretariat of the Pacific Community (SPC)
- Southeast Asian Fisheries Development Center (SEAFDEC)
- Statistical Office of the European Communities (Commission of the EU/Eurostat)
- Western and Central Pacific Fisheries Commission (WCPFC)

== Secretariat ==
The FAO serves as the CWP Secretariat. The CWP meets in full session approximately every two years and carries out intersessional and ad hoc meetings as required.

== Geographical coverage ==
Although first mandated to cover North Atlantic fisheries, since 1995 the CWP has extended its remit to all marine water bodies.

== Languages ==
- English

== Bibliography ==
- The Coordinating Working Party on Fishery Statistics: Its Origin, Role and Structure FAO Fisheries Circular No.903. Rome, December 1995.
