= Makin' It (TV series) =

- Opening title
- Created by: Mark Rothman; Lowell Ganz; Garry Marshall
- Starring: David Naughton; Greg Antonacci; Denise Miller; Ellen Travolta; Lou Antonio
- Theme music composer: Dino Fekaris; Freddie Perren
- Opening theme: "Makin' It" performed by David Naughton
- Country of origin: United States
- Original language: English
- No. of seasons: 1
- No. of episodes: 9

Production
- Executive producers: Thomas L. Miller; Edward K. Milkis; Lowell Ganz; Mark Rothman
- Producers: David W. Duclon; Deborah Leschin; Jeffrey Ganz
- Camera setup: Multi-camera
- Running time: 22–24 minutes
- Production companies: Miller-Milkis Productions; Henderson Productions; Stigwood Group, Ltd. Paramount Television

Original release
- Network: ABC
- Release: February 1 – March 23, 1979

Makin' It is an American sitcom starring David Naughton that aired for nine episodes on Fridays at 8:00PM on ABC from February 1 to March 23, 1979. It also aired in the United Kingdom on ITV from March 21, 1979.

In 2002, TV Guide ranked Makin' It at number 40 on its TV Guide's 50 Worst TV Shows of All Time list.

== Synopsis ==
The show was set in Passaic, New Jersey, and was about the daily life of Billy Manucci, a young man who frequented the local disco club, Inferno, at night while working at an ice cream parlor called Tasti-Queen during the day. Manucci was highly influenced by the disco craze and specifically by the movie Saturday Night Fever. Ellen Travolta, co-star of Saturday Night Fever and John Travolta's sister, played Manucci's mother.

Makin' It had the misfortune of coming to air near the end of the disco fad as backlash against the disco culture (such as the one portrayed in the show) was rising in the United States, culminating in Disco Demolition Night in the summer of 1979. As such, it lasted only eight weeks on air before being canceled. It ranked #104 out of 114 shows airing that season, with an 11.9 rating and a 20 share. The show was one of six whose cancellation was announced by ABC on the same day in April 1979, all listed in the same release in an issue of TV Guide, the other five series being Welcome Back, Kotter, What's Happening!!, Delta House, Starsky & Hutch, and the original Battlestar Galactica, which was gone after a single season despite its phenomenal popularity.

Robert Stigwood, the producer of Saturday Night Fever as well as the Bee Gees' manager, was involved in the show's creation, as was Garry Marshall. The theme song, sung by David Naughton, reached #5 on the Billboard Top 40 charts in 1979. It entered the Top 40 on May 12, nearly two months after the show had been canceled. The song was also featured in the Bill Murray movie Meatballs as well as the GameCube dance game MC Groovz Dance Craze. The song was also featured in the movie Detroit Rock City, despite the fact the movie is set in 1978 and Makin' It was released in 1979.

== Cast ==
- David Naughton as Billy Manucci
- Greg Antonacci as Tony Manucci, Billy's older brother
- Denise Miller as Tina Manucci, Billy's younger sister
- Ellen Travolta as Dorothy Manucci, Billy's mother
- Lou Antonio as Joseph Manucci, Billy's father
- Ralph Seymour as Al "Kingfish" Sorrentino
- Rebecca Balding as Corky Crandall
- Jennifer Perito as Ivy Papastegios
- Gary Prendergast as Bernard Fusco
- Wendy Hoffman as Suzanne

== Episodes ==
| No. | Title | Directed by | Written by | Original release date | Prod. code |
|---|---|---|---|---|---|
| 1 | "Stayin' Alive" | Lowell Ganz | Lowell Ganz, Mark Rothman | February 1, 1979 | 001 |
Debut: Billy Manucci is a New Jerseyan working his way through college and living at home in the shadow of his swinging older brother.
| 2 | "The Art Auction" | Joel Zwick | Ron Leavitt | February 2, 1979 | 003 |
Billy poses as Al Pacino's brother to get into an art auction, and bids $5,000 for a painting to impress Corky.
| 3 | "Big Brother Is Watching" | Joel Zwick | Judith D. Allison | February 9, 1979 | 002 |
Billy is at loose ends while trying to protect his sister from a well-known Casanova who prides himself on one-night stands.
| 4 | "Fun, Fun, Fun: Part 1" | Mark Rothman | David W. Duclon | February 16, 1979 | 004 |
Billy quits school and his job so he can experience the "good life".
| 5 | "Fun, Fun, Fun: Part 2" | John Tracy | Deborah Leschin | February 23, 1979 | 005 |
Billy shirks his responsibilities and moves in with his brother.
| 6 | "Something for Ma" | Joel Zwick | Babaloo Mandel | March 2, 1979 | 007 |
Tony surprises his mother with a pair of expensive earrings for her birthday, which leads her to being arrested because the police think they are stolen.
| 7 | "Little Orphan Fusco" | Unknown | Unknown | March 9, 1979 | 010 |
Bernard thanks Dorothy for nursing his injured foot by sending gifts, which her kids mistake for presents from a lover.
| 8 | "Tony's Homecoming" | Joel Zwick | Richard Rosenstock | March 16, 1979 | 008 |
Tony and his parents are reunited after a two-year separation.
| 9 | "Friends for Life" | John Tracy | Stephen Nathan, Paul B. Price | March 23, 1979 | 009 |
When Dorothy gets flowers from a secret admirer, her children suspect her of having an affair with the local encyclopedia salesman.
