= Tita Bell =

American television soap opera writer

Tita Bell is an American television soap opera writer. Besides working on soap operas, Bell also wrote a scenario for a Bednaya Nastya in 2003, and had a recurring role as Trudy on Happy Days from 1974 to 1977.

== Positions held ==
The City

- Script Writer: November 13, 1995 – March 28, 1997

Guiding Light

- Writer: July 24, 2007 – September 18, 2009
- Script Writer: 1997 – April 2003, September 2004 – July 23, 2007

== Awards and nominations ==
Daytime Emmy Award

- Win, 2007, Best Writing, Guiding Light
- Nomination, 1999, 2003 & 2005, Best Writing, Guiding Light

Writers Guild of America Award

- Win, 2004, Best Writing, Guiding Light
- Nomination, 1997, 1998, 2001, 2002 & 2006, Best Writing, Guiding Light
