= Barbara Rhoades =

American actress (born 1947)

- Rhoades in 1972
- Born: March 23, 1947 (age 79); Poughkeepsie, New York, U.S.
- Other names: Barbara Rhodes; Barbara Orenstein
- Occupation: Actress
- Years active: 1967–2011
- Spouse: Bernie Orenstein
- Children: 1

Barbara Rhoades (born March 23, 1947) is an American actress, known primarily for her comedy and mystery roles, especially as lady bandit Penelope ("Bad Penny") Cushings in The Shakiest Gun in the West (1968) with Don Knotts.

She had a recurring role on Soap as Maggie Chandler, Jodie Dallas's future wife.

== Early years ==
Born March 23, 1947, in Poughkeepsie, New York, Rhoades attended Our Lady of Lourdes High School.

She began taking dancing lessons when she was 7 years old.

== Career ==
Rhoades began acting in the late 1960s, appearing in guest roles on several television series, including It Takes a Thief, Ironside, Mannix, McMillan & Wife, Columbo, Kojak, Starsky & Hutch, Alias Smith and Jones, Love, American Style, The Odd Couple, The Six Million Dollar Man, Sanford and Son, Bewitched, Maude, Trapper John, M.D.,The Partridge Family, Murder, She Wrote, Cagney & Lacey, and Law & Order. She was a regular cast member of the 1977 situation comedy Busting Loose, portraying Melody Feebeck, and in 1989, as Jessica Gardner on Generations

In 1967, Rhoades signed a long-term exclusive contract with Universal Pictures.

Rhoades appeared in a number of films during the 1970s, including There Was a Crooked Man... (1970), opposite Kirk Douglas and Henry Fonda, and Up the Sandbox (1972) starring Barbra Streisand. She played a police officer, "No Balls" Hadley, in 1977's The Choirboys and a Las Vegas hooker who picks up Art Carney along the road during his Oscar-winning performance in Harry and Tonto (1974). She also had roles in Scream Blacula Scream (1973) and The Goodbye Girl (1977) and was a frequent panelist on the popular 1970s game show Match Game, hosted by Gene Rayburn. In 2007, she appeared in First Born with Elisabeth Shue.

In 2011, she had a recurring role on the American soap opera One Life to Live as Irene Manning, childhood best friend of Victoria Lord (Erika Slezak).

For 18 months on Broadway, Rhoades had the role of a showgirl in the musical Funny Girl (1964). She gained other stage experience in summer stock productions at the Cecilwood Theater in Fishkill, New York.

== Personal life ==
On Sunday, February 18, 1979, in a ceremony conducted at L'Orangerie (a then-fashionable French restaurant located in West Hollywood), Rhoades was married to television producer Bernie Orenstein. In 1995, they and their son Alec moved to Weston, Connecticut, where they still resided in 2011, and where, on occasion, Rhoades continued to perform.

== Filmography ==
Film
Year	Title	Role	Notes
1968	The Shakiest Gun in the West	Penelope 'Bad Penny' Cushings	
1968	Don't Just Stand There!	Kendall Flanagan	
1970	There Was a Crooked Man...	Miss Jessie Brundidge	
1972	Up the Sandbox	Dr. Bolden	
1973	Scream Blacula Scream	Elaine	
1973	Little Cigars	Helen	Credited as Barbara Rhodes; Alternative title: The Little Cigars Mob
1974	Harry and Tonto	Stephanie	
1976	The Great Houdini	Margery Crandon	
1977	The Choirboys	No Balls Hadley	
1977	The Goodbye Girl	Donna	
1980	Serial	Vivian	
2007	First Born	Nancy	
Television
Year	Title	Role	Notes
1968	The Virginian	Josie	Episode: "With Help from Ulysses"
1968	It Takes a Thief	Hilda	Episode: "A Spot of Trouble"
1968	Mannix	Billie	Season 2 episode 02 "Comes Up rose"
1969	Love, American Style	Bunny	Season 1, Episode 2, Vignette: "Love and the Unlikely Couple"; Credited as Barbara Rhodes
1970	The Partridge Family	La Von	Episode: "Danny and the Mob"
1970	Mannix	Donna	Episode: "Once upon a Saturday"
1971	Bewitched	Aretha	Episode: "The House That Uncle Arthur Built "
1971	Columbo	Hostess	Episode: "Lady in Waiting"
1972	McCloud	Susan	Episode: "Give My Regrets to Broadway"
1972	Mission: Impossible	Vicki Wells	1 episode
1972	The Paul Lynde Show	Eve Loring	Episode 10: "Whose Lib?"
1972–1973	McMillan & Wife		4 episodes
1973	Kojak	Joanna Ferro	Episode: "Web of Death"
1973	Night Gallery	Julie	Episode: "Something in the Woodwork"
1973	Police Story	Marnie	Episode: "Slow Boy"
1974	Happy Days	Bubbles McCall	Episode: "The Skin Game"
1974	The Odd Couple	Lucy	Episode: "Our Fathers"
1974	Nakia	Jackie Thayer	Episode: "Roots of Anger"
1975	Kolchak: The Night Stalker	Unnamed secretary	Episode: "Primal Scream"
1975	Petrocelli	Virginia Halima	1 episode
1975	Ellery Queen	Veronica Vale	1 episode
1975	Columbo	Joyce	Episode: "Identity Crisis"
1975	Starsky & Hutch	Robin Morton	Episode: "Shootout"
1975	The Six Million Dollar Man	Kelly Wixted	Episode: "Target in the Sky"
1976	The Blue Knight	Carrie	4 episodes
1976	Sanford and Son	Gladys	3 episodes
1977	Busting Loose	Melody Feebeck	Regular (21 episodes)
1977	Match Game	Herself ('77-'82)	
1978	Quark	Princess Carna	Episode: "The Old and the Beautiful"
1978	The Love Boat	Di Di Donnelly	1 episode
1978	Maude	Maggie Gallagher	Episode: "Maude's Big Move: Part 3"
1978	The Eddie Capra Mysteries	Alicia	Episode: "Murder! Murder!"
1979	Hanging In	Maggie Gallagher	4 episodes
1979	Super Train		1 episode (February 1979 episode 2)
1979–1981	Password Plus	Herself	15 episodes
1980–1981	Soap	Maggie Chandler	10 episodes
1982	Magnum, P.I.	Marcella Ziller	1 episode
1984	Murder, She Wrote	Barbara Stevenson	Episode: "Birds of a Feather"
1985	Cagney & Lacey	Cece Wentworth	Episode: "Happily Ever After"
1986	You Again?	Maggie Davis	4 episodes
1988	Charles in Charge	Pat Walker	1 episode
1988	Murder, She Wrote	Flo Oakes	1 episode
1989	Generations	Jessica Gardner	series regular
1990	Father Dowling Mysteries	Daphne Dumont	1 episode
1991	Over My Dead Body	Det. Loraine McBride	1 episode
1993	Diagnosis: Murder	Marcy Blake	1 episode
1995	Marker	Woman	1 episode
2003	Law & Order	Kathy McGarity	1 episode
2011	One Life to Live	Irene Manning	
