= Mark Rothman =

American writer (1947–2025)

- Born: Mark Harvey Rothman; November 1, 1947; New York City, U.S.
- Died: August 13, 2025 (aged 77)
- Occupations: Screenwriter, television comedy writer, producer
- Years active: 1960s–2025
- Known for: Staff writer for and co-producer of ABC-TV's Laverne & Shirley Head writer for ABC-TV's The Odd Couple and Happy Days Writer for CBS-TV's The Ted Knight Show Co-creator, co-executive producer, and a writer for the 1977 CBS-TV series Busting Loose
- Website: http://markrothmansblog.blogspot.com

Mark Harvey Rothman (November 1, 1947 – August 13, 2025) was an American writer best known for having been involved with the creation and production of Laverne and Shirley. He was also the head writer and show runner of numerous other shows including Happy Days and The Odd Couple.

== Life and career ==
Mark Harvey Rothman was born in New York City on November 1, 1947. He was co-creator, co-executive producer, and a writer for the 1977 situation comedy Busting Loose and the 1978 situation comedy The Ted Knight Show. He also composed the theme song for Busting Loose. He was also writer, theme tune composer and executive producer for The Lovebirds.

He wrote many screenplays and several plays, including The Wearing of the Greens, and Who Wants Fame?. His first play Excess Baggage, was well received. He later lived in Farmington Hills, Michigan. In the spring of 2008, he appeared in the title role of a new musical, The Brain From Planet X in Los Angeles, where he and the show received unanimous raves.

Rothman released two books "Show Runner - My Life and Opinions In and Out of the Sitcom Trenches", and "Show Runner Two". Both are collections of autobiographical essays.

In 2013 he had his first novel, "I'm Not Garbo," published. It is a fable about Hollywood in the 1930s.

Rothman died on August 13, 2025, at the age of 77.

== Filmography ==
- The Odd Couple - Writer
- Happy Days - Writer/ Producer/ Executive Script Consultant
- Paul Sands in Friends and Lovers - Writer
- Laverne & Shirley - Creator/ Writer/ Producer/ Executive Script Consultant
- Busting Loose - Creator/ Writer/ Executive Producer
- Walking Walter - Writer
- The Rita Moreno Show - Creator/ Writer/ Executive Producer
- America 2100 - Creator
- The Lovebirds - Creator/ Writer/ Executive Producer
- Makin'it - Creator/ Writer/ Executive Producer/ Director
- It's a Living - Creator and Writer
- The New Odd Couple - Writer/ Supervising Producer
- The Jeffersons - Writer
- She's the Sheriff - Creator/ Writer/ Executive Producer/ Director
- The Further Adventures of Wally Brown - Executive Producer
- The Ted Knight Show - Executive Producer
