= 1982 in American television =

In 1982, television in the United States saw a number of significant events, including the debuts, finales, and cancellations of television shows; the launch, closure, and rebranding of channels; changes and additions to network affiliations by stations; controversies, business transactions, and carriage disputes; and the deaths of individuals who had made notable contributions to the medium.

== Events ==
Date	Event
January 1	Cable News Network (CNN) initiates an associated channel, dubbed CNN2, that features a round-the-clock "news wheel" format. The channel would be renamed CNN Headline News a year later and is now known as HLN.
January 1	The National Association of Broadcasters ends its long-standing Television Code in response to a Washington, D.C. circuit court ruling which declared parts of it unconstitutional.
January 2	American Playhouse on PBS member station WNET/Newark, New Jersey presents John Cheever's teleplay The Shady Hill Kidnapping, featuring George Grizzard, Polly Holliday, Judith Ivey, E. Katherine Kerr and Celeste Holm as The Celebrity.
January 4	Bryant Gumbel begins his 15-year stint as co-anchor of NBC's Today Show.
January 4	ABC broadcasts a TV adaptation of The Elephant Man, with Philip Anglim and Kevin Conway reprising the roles they originated for the Broadway version of the story.
January 4	In Panama City, Florida, NBC affiliate WMBB swaps affiliations with ABC affiliate WJHG-TV.
January 10	CBS televises the NFC Championship Game between the San Francisco 49ers and Dallas Cowboys. In what would become one of the most iconic images in NFL history, San Francisco tight end Dwight Clark makes "The Catch" to enable the 49ers to defeat the Cowboys, 28–27, and go to their first ever Super Bowl. Vin Scully called the game alongside Hank Stram on television while Pat Summerall (who would do the play-by-play for Super Bowl XVI with John Madden two weeks later) called the game with Jack Buck for CBS Radio.
January 23	CBS Reports broadcasts The Uncounted Enemy: A Vietnam Deception, a documentary alleging a manipulation of intelligence estimates before the Tet Offensive in Vietnam. Retired Gen. William Westmoreland, the commander of U.S. military operations at the time of the alleged estimates, would file a libel suit against CBS believing the report described him unfairly.
January 30	The Golden Globe Awards air for the second consecutive year on CBS. The ceremony would soon become embroiled into controversy when actress Pia Zadora won that year's Golden Globe Award as Best New Star of the Year amid charges that her husband Meshulam Riklis had purchased the award with a promotional campaign that included Zadora's image presented prominently on Sunset Boulevard billboards, an appearance in Playboy magazine, and entertaining Golden Globe voters. After CBS decided to negate their broadcasting contract in light of the controversy, the Golden Globes would not be seen on broadcast network television again until 1996, when NBC picked them up.
February 1	Late Night with David Letterman debuts on NBC; Letterman's first guests are Bill Murray (who dances around to the song "Physical") and "Mr. Wizard" Don Herbert.
February 1	Two months after new owners Pacific Media Corporation changed its call letters from KECC-TV, CBS affiliate KECY-TV in Yuma, Arizona leaves the network to join ABC. This will leave Yuma without a CBS affiliate for 3 years, until KECY-TV rejoins the network in 1985 (it is now a Fox affiliate).
February 3	Singer Jermaine Jackson guest-features, as Tootie (Kim Fields) gets to meet the person she admires on a very special episode of the NBC sitcom The Facts of Life.
February 7	As part of a two-night event, ABC airs the network television broadcast premiere of Superman: The Movie.
March 4	The crime drama spoof Police Squad! premieres on ABC; though it only lasts 6 episodes (the last being broadcast July 8); the comedy would serve as the origin of the Frank Drebin character and the inspiration for the Naked Gun movie series.
March 8	Night of 100 Stars, a benefit for the Actors' Fund taped at Radio City Music Hall, is broadcast by ABC.
March 26	The soap opera series Search for Tomorrow is broadcast for the final time by CBS. NBC immediately purchases it and begins broadcasting it the following Monday.
April 2	John Chancellor anchors the NBC Nightly News for the final time, replaced on April 5 by the team of Roger Mudd and Tom Brokaw, a partnership that lasts 17 months.
April 21	Norman Lear purchases Avco Embassy Pictures and rechristens his TAT Communications Company as Embassy Television.
April 21	WGXA in Macon, Georgia signs-on the air, giving the Macon market its first full-time ABC affiliate.
April 21	WTTO in Birmingham, Alabama signs-on the air, giving the Birmingham market its first independent station.
May 2	The Weather Channel is begun in the U.S.
May 6	The CBS television network announces its plans for the 1982-83 TV season, which includes the cancellations of five series: House Calls, Lou Grant, Mr. Merlin, Nurse and WKRP in Cincinnati. A CBS spokesman said Lou Grant is being canceled "reluctantly" due to low ratings.
May 15	Danny DeVito hosts an episode of Saturday Night Live soon after Taxi is canceled after its fourth season. During the opening monologue, DeVito reads a letter supposedly from his mother asking God to forgive ABC for cancelling the show, adding that "but I'll understand if you don't." A filmed bit has him driving around New York looking morose until inspiration strikes, and he blows up the ABC building. In addition, the Taxi cast members are given an opportunity for closure, which up to that point had been denied for them due to the abrupt cancellation. The actors took their "final" bows during DeVito's opening monologue, only to have NBC (which aired SNL) pick up the show.
May 17	Actor Ed Asner, the president of the Screen Actors Guild and star of the Lou Grant television series, accuses the CBS network of cancelling his show for political reasons related to his stances on such issues as the Salvadoran Civil War.
May 22	In Boston, Massachusetts, CBS affiliate WNAC-TV ceases operations due to improprieties by its parent company RKO General, having lost the license (as well as those of KHJ-TV and WOR-TV, both of which RKO temporarily retain on appeal) after General Tire admitted to a litany of corporate misconduct (including, among other things, committing financial fraud over illegal political contributions and bribes) as part of a settlement with the U.S. Securities and Exchange Commission, and RKO General withheld evidence from the FCC of General Tire's misconduct, and also failed to disclose evidence of accounting errors on its own part. Several hours later, New England Television begins operations of WNEV-TV (now independent station WHDH) on channel 7, retaining WNAC-TV's former CBS affiliation.
May 24	The Peanuts special A Charlie Brown Celebration premiered on CBS. Which it includes several stories with one or two-word titles, was later adapted for the Saturday morning series, The Charlie Brown and Snoopy Show, which premiered in 1983.
May 27	The series finale of Mork & Mindy entitled "The Mork Report" is broadcast on ABC. While it actually was not the final episode to be filmed, ABC still aired it last in hopes of giving the canceled series some proper closure.
May 28	At about 5:00 p.m., Joseph Billie Gwin, wanting to "prevent World War III", forces his way into the studios of Phoenix CBS affiliate KOOL-TV, fires a gunshot, takes 4 people hostage (holding one of them, cameraman Louis Villa, at close gunpoint), and demands national broadcasting time. Three hours later, Gwin releases 2 hostages, Jack Webb and Bob Cimino. At 9:30 p.m., with Gwin sitting next to him with a gun, KOOL anchor Bill Close reads a 20-minute statement; when finished, Close takes Gwin's gun and sets it on the table.
May 28	American film critic Leonard Maltin makes his first appearance on the television news magazine Entertainment Tonight.
June 6	The CBS affiliate in Orlando, WDBO-TV, changes its name to WCPX-TV.
July 11	ABC broadcasts the FIFA World Cup Final between Italy and West Germany from Madrid. It's the first time that the World Cup's final match is aired live on American television.
July 13	ABC broadcasts the Major League Baseball All-Star Game from Olympic Stadium in Montreal, Quebec, Canada. It's the first time that the Mid-Summer's Classic is played outside of the United States.
July 21	The only episode of the sitcom Cass Malloy airs on CBS. Although not picked up as a regular series, it serves as the pilot for the 1987–1989 syndicated sitcom She's the Sheriff.
July 29	Professional wrestler Jerry Lawler slaps actor Andy Kaufman in the face on the NBC program Late Night with David Letterman; Kaufman responds by throwing coffee and shouting profanities at Lawler. The incident was later revealed to have been staged.
August 8	In Columbia, Missouri, NBC affiliate and University of Missouri-owned KOMU-TV swaps affiliations with ABC affiliate KCBJ-TV. The swap would eventually be reversed in 1985.
August 30	Field Communications begins its liquidation by selling off WFLD to Metromedia.
September 6	After Tom Wopat and John Schneider quit the CBS action series The Dukes of Hazzard as a result of a contract dispute, their characters, Bo and Luke Duke, are written out of the series as joining a NASCAR team and are replaced by cousins Coy and Vance (played respectively by Byron Cherry and Christopher Mayer). Bo and Luke—and Wopat and Schneider—would return to the series by season's end.
September 11	NBC resurrects Texaco Star Theater as a one-time special; however, instead of inviting Milton Berle, the man who hosted the original series during the 1950s, the special presents a salute to musicals.
September 11	In Savannah, Georgia, NBC affiliate WSAV-TV swaps affiliations with ABC affiliate WJCL, citing ABC's stronger ratings. The swap would eventually be reversed in 1986.
September 12	KNLC, a religious independent station in St. Louis goes on the air.
September 13	Mary Hart joins Entertainment Tonight as reporter and later co-host; she would fill the latter role until 2011.
September 20	USA Network begins 24-hour operations, featuring the debut of the USA Cartoon Express, cable television's first structured animation block.
September 24	On CBS, Byron Cherry and Christopher Mayer make their first appearances as Coy and Vance Duke respectively on The Dukes of Hazzard. Cherry and Mayer are brought in to replace John Schneider (Bo Duke) and Tom Wopat (Luke Duke), who are absent for the first 18 episodes of Season 5 due to a dispute over royalties.
September 25	Saturday Night Live begins its 8th season on NBC, with host Chevy Chase and musical guest Queen. Among the new additions for this season include future Seinfeld actress Julia Louis-Dreyfus, who will stay for 3 years (1982–1985) as a featured player/regular cast member.
September 30	The pilot episode for Cheers airs on NBC.
October 1	Independent station KDOC-TV commences broadcasting in Los Angeles.
October 2	Mary Jo Catlett replaces Nedra Volz on the NBC sitcom Diff'rent Strokes, as the new housekeeper, Mrs. Pearl Gallagher. She will stay with the series until its conclusion in 1986.
October 2	The CBS affiliate in Phoenix, KOOL-TV, changes its name to KTSP-TV.
October 3	During the National Football League players strike (on what would have been Week 5 of the season), CBS broadcasts four Division III football games using their regular NFL broadcast crews.
October 4	KMTR signs-on in Eugene, Oregon as an NBC affiliate. Due to NBC's persistent low ratings, the network's former affiliate KVAL-TV had been preempting NBC programming (with increasing regularity) in favor of programs from CBS (shared with ABC affiliate KEZI), forcing a frustrated NBC to seek a new station. With the move, KVAL-TV becomes a full-time CBS affiliate.
October 6	WFBT, a religious television station in Minneapolis/St. Paul goes on the air.
October 12	Cindy Williams makes her final appearance as Shirley Finney on the ABC sitcom Laverne & Shirley. In March 1982, Williams became pregnant with her first child. In August 1982, two episodes into production of the series' eighth season, Williams would leave the show and file a $20 million lawsuit against Paramount after they demand that Williams work on her scheduled due date. The case is later settled out of court and Williams is released from her contract.
October 22	Susan Stafford departs as co-host of the NBC game show Wheel of Fortune to do humanitarian work. Auditions occur for her replacement, with Vanna White formally replacing Stafford on December 13. As of 2022, White remains the co-host of Wheel.
October 23	SIN broadcasts the final of the 5th National OTI-SIN Festival live from Miami.
October 25	The second season of Cagney & Lacey premieres on CBS with Sharon Gless now assuming the role of Det. Christine Cagney. Meg Foster portrayed Cagney in the first season. Foster was dismissed after the first six episodes because CBS deemed her too aggressive and too likely to be perceived as a lesbian by the viewers.
November 13	CBS broadcasts a world championship boxing match between Ray Mancini and Kim Duk-koo that results in Kim's death five days after the bout.
November 18	After originating as a four-hour long programming block on a channel known as Escapade in January 1982, the channel as a whole is officially relaunched as The Playboy Channel.
November 20	At the age of 7, Drew Barrymore becomes the youngest person to ever guest-host Saturday Night Live on NBC. As fate would have it, she ends up hosting the same episode that saw Andy Kaufman banned from ever performing on the show again.
November 26	Howard Cosell denounces professional boxing during the ABC broadcast of a WBC heavyweight championship bout between titleholder Larry Holmes and a clearly outmatched Randall "Tex" Cobb at the Astrodome in Houston, Texas. Cosell, horrified over the brutality of the one-sided fight, said that if the referee did not stop the fight he would never broadcast a professional fight again.
December 5	Southwest Championship Wrestling becomes the first weekly wrestling program on the USA Network, airing Sundays at 11:00 a.m. Eastern Time. However, because of a particularly bloody match between Tully Blanchard and "Bruiser" Bob Sweetan (which USA refused to air), the inability of the promotion to keep paying USA the $7,000 per week to keep the time slot, and a monetary offer made to the cable channel by WWF owner Vince McMahon to replace Southwest Championship Wrestling with his own programming, USA will end up canceling the program in September (in spite of the high ratings the show was garnering for the network), replacing it with WWF All American Wrestling.
December 11	ESPN broadcasts its first live college football game, simulcasting the Independence Bowl match-up between Kansas State University and the University of Wisconsin.
December 11	TBS in association with Sports Productions, Inc. broadcasts a heavily anticipated college basketball match-up between the Virginia Cavaliers (led by Ralph Sampson) and Georgetown Hoyas (led by Patrick Ewing). TBS paid approximately US$600,000 for the broadcasting rights to the game that was called by Skip Caray and Abe Lemons.
December 11	Eddie Murphy becomes the first and to date, only person to guest-host NBC's Saturday Night Live while still a cast member. Murphy's 48 Hours co-star Nick Nolte was originally supposed to host until he fell ill.
December 27	SuperStation WTBS debuts one of the first video game-themed TV series, Starcade.
December 29	Nastassja Kinski makes a puzzling appearance on the NBC program Late Night with David Letterman, seeming somewhat oblivious to the jokes and everything else that was going on around her and appearing with an unusual hair style Letterman describes as "looking like there was an owl perched on top of her head." (Letterman's second guest, John Candy, comes out with his own hair moussed up in a pile as a spoof of Kinski's hair.)
December 29	Surround Sound is introduced for home use by Dolby.
December 31	Texas and The Doctors have their final episodes aired on NBC.

== Programs ==
=== Debuting this year ===
Date	Show	Network
January 7	Fame	NBC
January 12	American Playhouse	PBS
January 16	King's Crossing	ABC
January 23	One of the Boys	NBC
February 1	Late Night with David Letterman	NBC
March 6	Chicago Story	NBC
March 3	The Kids of Degrassi Street	Showtime
March 12	T.J. Hooker	ABC
March 17	Herbie the Matchmaker	CBS
March 19	The Phoenix	ABC
March 23	Joanie Loves Chachi	ABC
March 23	Q.E.D.	CBS
March 25	Cagney & Lacey	CBS
March 29	Capitol	CBS
April 5	Report to Murphy	CBS
April 14	Teachers Only	NBC
May 4	The Book of Lists	CBS
July 5	America This Morning	ABC
July 21	Cass Malloy	CBS
August 9	Filthy Rich	CBS
September 1	Sewing with Nancy	Syndication
September 12	Blackstar	CBS
September 17	The Powers of Matthew Star	NBC
September 18	The Gary Coleman Show	NBC
September 18	The Incredible Hulk	NBC
September 18	Gilligan's Planet	CBS
September 18	Meatballs & Spaghetti	CBS
September 18	Pandamonium	CBS
September 19	Seven Brides for Seven Brothers	CBS
September 20	Child's Play	CBS
September 22	Family Ties	NBC
September 22	Tales of the Gold Monkey	ABC
September 24	Bring 'Em Back Alive	CBS
September 25	The Little Rascals	ABC
September 25	Mork & Mindy/Laverne & Shirley/Fonz Hour	ABC
September 25	Pac-Man	ABC
September 25	The Scooby & Scrappy-Doo/Puppy Hour	ABC
September 25	Silver Spoons	NBC
September 26	Knight Rider	NBC
September 26	At the Movies with Gene Siskel and Roger Ebert	Syndication
September 26	Matt Houston	ABC
September 26	Gloria	CBS
September 27	Square Pegs	CBS
September 30	Cheers	NBC
October 1	Remington Steele	NBC
October 2	The Devlin Connection	NBC
October 3	Voyagers!	NBC
October 4	CBS Morning News	CBS
October 6	Tucker's Witch	CBS
October 10	Nature	PBS
October 14	It Takes Two	ABC
October 22	The Quest	ABC
October 25	Newhart	CBS
October 26	St. Elsewhere	NBC
October 26	Gavilan	NBC
October 29	The New Odd Couple	ABC
December 12	Powerhouse	PBS
December 27	Starcade	TBS

=== Resuming this year ===
Show	Last aired	Previous network	Return date
Tattletales	1978	CBS	January 18

=== Ending this year ===
Date	Show	Debut
January 8	Behind the Screen	1981
January 15	Darkroom	1981
March 1	In Search of... (returned in 2002)	1977
March 6	Spider-Man	1981
March 22	Mr. Merlin	1981
March 26	Password Plus (returned in 1984)	1979
April 7	Shannon	1981
April 17	The Lawrence Welk Show	1955
April 21	WKRP in Cincinnati	1978
April 23	Blockbusters	1980
April 23	Fridays	1980
May 12	The Incredible Hulk	1977
May 20	Barney Miller	1975
May 21	Strike Force	1981
May 27	Mork & Mindy	1978
May 27	Bosom Buddies	1980
June 11	It's a Living (returned in 1985)	1980
July 21	Cass Malloy	1982
July 30	Lewis & Clark	1981
August 24	McClain's Law	1981
September 4	The Tom and Jerry Comedy Show	1980
September 5	Goldie Gold and Action Jack	1981
September 10	Match Game (returned in 1990)	1962
September 11	The Flintstone Comedy Show	1980
September 11	The Kwicky Koala Show	1981
September 12	Code Red	1981
September 13	Lou Grant	1977
September 18	Laverne & Shirley	1981
October 1	Sunrise Semester	1957
December 18	Scooby-Doo and Scrappy-Doo	1980
December 25	The Devlin Connection	1982
December 31	Texas	1980
December 31	The Doctors	1963

=== Changing networks ===
Show	Moved from	Moved to
Search for Tomorrow	CBS	NBC
Taxi	ABC	NBC

=== Made-for-TV movies and miniseries ===
Title	Network	Premiere date
Cry for the Strangers	CBS	February 11
The Elephant Man	ABC	January 4
A Woman Called Golda	CBS	April 26
Inside the Third Reich	ABC	May 9
Little Gloria... Happy at Last	NBC	October 24
Million Dollar Infield	CBS	February 2
The Blue and the Gray (miniseries)	CBS	November 14
The Executioner's Song	NBC	November 28, 29

== Networks and services ==
=== Launches ===
Network	Type	Launch date	Notes	Source
Daytime and Lifetime Medical Television	Cable television	March		
CNN2	Cable television	January 1		
California Music Channel	Cable television	March 1		
The Weather Channel	Cable and satellite	May 2		
Cable Health Network	Cable television	June		
Satellite News Channel	Cable television	June 21		
Home Shopping Club	Cable television	September 20		
Playboy TV	Cable television	November 18		

=== Conversions and rebrandings ===
Old network	New network	Type	Conversion date	Notes	Source
CNN2	Headline News	Cable television	August 9		

=== Closures ===
Network	Type	Closure date	Notes	Source
CBS Cable	Cable television	December 17		

== Television stations ==
=== Sign-ons ===
Date	City of License/Market	Station	Channel	Affiliation	Notes/Ref.
February 14	Albany, Georgia	WTSG-TV	31	Independent	
February 20	Richmond, Virginia	WRLH-TV	35	Independent	
March 6	Orlando, Florida	WIYE	55	Religious ind.	
March 12	Mobile, Alabama (Pensacola, Florida)	WPMI	15	Independent	
March 18	Grand Rapids/Kalamazoo/Battle Creek, Michigan	WWMA-TV	17	Independent	
March 22	Savannah, Georgia	WTGS	28	Independent	
April 4	Chicago, Illinois	WBBS-TV	60	Spanish independent	
April 20	Chicago, Illinois	WPWR-TV	60	Independent	
April 21	Homewood, Alabama (Birmingham/Tuscaloosa, Alabama)	WTTO	21	Independent	
April 21	Macon, Georgia	WGXA	24	ABC	
April 23	Canton, Ohio	WOAC	67	Independent	
May 5	Harlingen, Texas (Brownsville/McAllen, Texas)	KZLN	60	PBS	
May 11	Richmond, Indiana/Dayton, Ohio	WKOI-TV	43	TBN	
May 16	Opelika/Auburn, Alabama (Columbus, Georgia)	WSWS-TV	66	Independent	
May 22	Boston, Massachusetts	WNEV-TV	7	CBS	
June 1	Cape Girardeau, Missouri (Paducah, Kentucky/Harrisburg, Illinois)	KBSI	23	Independent	
June 13	Lima, Ohio	WTLW	44	Religious independent	
June 16	Inglis/Yankeetown/Lecanto/Gainesville, Florida	W49AI	49	Independent	
June 16	Topeka, Kansas	K06KZ	6	Independent	Now Fox affiliate KTMJ-CD on channel 43
July 1	Baltimore, Maryland	WNUV	54	Independent	
July 5	Daytona Beach/Orlando, Florida	WMOD	26	Independent	
July 8	West Palm Beach, Florida	WHRS-TV	42	PBS	
July 21	Victoria, Texas	KAVU-TV	25	NBC	
July 30	Albany, New York	WXXA-TV	23	Independent	
August 4	Dickinson, North Dakota	KDSE	9	PBS	Part of Prairie Public Television
August 6	Cocoa/Orlando, Florida	WTGL-TV	52	Independent	
September 5	Prescott/Phoenix, Arizona	KUSK	7	Independent	
September 10	Lander, Wyoming	KOWY	7	CBS	
September 12	St. Louis, Missouri	KNLC	24	Religious independent	now a MeTV owned-and-operated station
September 19	Huntington/Charleston, West Virginia	WVAH-TV	11	Independent	
October 1	Anaheim/Los Angeles, California	KDOC-TV	56	Independent	
October 2	Centralia, Washington	KCKA	15	PBS	Satellite of KBTC-TV, Tacoma, Washington
October 4	Eugene, Oregon	KMTR	16	NBC	
October 6	Minneapolis/St. Paul, Minnesota	WFBT	29	Independent	
October 16	Miami, Florida	WDZL	39	Independent	
October 17	West Palm Beach, Florida	WFLX	29	Independent	
October 18	Beattyville/Lexington, Kentucky	WLJC-TV	65	Independent	
October 18	Peoria, Illinois	WBLN	43	Independent	
October 24	Amarillo, Texas	KJTV	14	Independent	
October 31	Spokane, Washington	KAYU-TV	28	Independent	
November	Bruce, Mississippi	W07BN	7	Independent	
November 7	Houston, Texas	KTXH	20	Independent	
November 16	Jacksonville/New Bern, North Carolina	WUNM-TV	19	PBS	Part of University of North Carolina Television
November 24	Minneapolis/St. Paul, Minnesota	KXLI	41	Independent	
December 1	Lansing, Michigan	WFSL-TV	47	Independent	
December 5	Sandusky, Ohio	WGGN	52	Religious independent	
December 12	Lake Charles, Louisiana	KVHP	29	Independent	
December 23	Honolulu, Hawaii	KSHO-TV	36	Independent	

=== Network affiliation changes ===
Date	City of License/Market	Station	Channel	Old affiliation	New affiliation	Notes/Ref.
January 4	Panama City, Florida	WJHG-TV	7	ABC	NBC	
January 4	Panama City, Florida	WMBB	13	NBC	ABC	
February 1	Yuma, Arizona/El Centro, California	KECY-TV	9	CBS	ABC	
March 22	Waterbury/Hartford, Connecticut	WTXX	20	NBC	Independent	
August 8	Columbia, Missouri	KOMU	8	NBC	ABC	
August 8	Columbia, Missouri	KCBJ-TV	17	ABC	NBC	
September 11	Savannah, Georgia	WSAV-TV	3	NBC	ABC	
September 11	Savannah, Georgia	WJCL	22	ABC	NBC	
October 4	Eugene, Oregon	KVAL-TV	13	NBC	CBS	

=== Sign-Offs ===
Date	City of license/Market	Station	Channel	Affiliation	Sign-on date	Notes
May 22	Boston, Massachusetts	WNAC-TV	7	CBS	June 21, 1948	Replaced with WNEV-TV.
June 4	Hanover, New Hampshire	WHED-TV	15	PBS	April 11, 1968	

== Births ==
Date	Name	Notability
January 1	Ben Domenech	Editor
January 1	Dana DeLorenzo	Actress (The Late Late Show with Craig Ferguson, Ash vs Evil Dead)
January 3	Tricia Dickson	Voice actress (Nickelodeon)
January 5	Allen Evangelista	Actor (Zoey 101, The Secret Life of the American Teenager)
January 5	Jessica Chaffin	Actress
January 7	Lauren Cohan	Actress (Supernatural, The Walking Dead)
January 7	Eddie Redmayne	Actor
January 8	Gaby Hoffmann	Actress
January 10	Josh Ryan Evans	Actor (Timmy on Passions) (d. 2002)
January 13	Ruth Wilson	Actress
January 16	Birgitte Hjort Sørensen	Actress
January 17	David Blue	Actor (Stargate Universe)
January 18	Joanna Newsom	Actress
January 19	Jodie Sweetin	Actress (Full House, Fuller House)
January 19	Simone Missick	Actress
January 28	Keltie Knight	Actress
January 29	Adam Lambert	Singer, songwriter and actor (American Idol, Glee)
January 29	Heidi Mueller	Actress (Passions)
January 31	Jon Gabrus	Actor (CollegeHumor Originals)
February 3	Bridget Regan	Actress (Legend of the Seeker, Jane the Virgin, Agent Carter)
February 6	Alice Eve	Actress
February 7	Cory Doran	Canadian actor (George of the Jungle, Jimmy Two-Shoes, Stoked, Pearlie, Wild Kratts, Total Drama, Rocket Monkeys)
February 8	Danny Tamberelli	Actor (The Adventures of Pete & Pete, The Magic School Bus, All That, Fillmore!)
February 10	Lauren Scala	Television reporter
February 12	Carter Hayden	Canadian actor (Total Drama, Camp Lakebottom)
February 17	Brooke D'Orsay	Canadian actress (6teen, Happy Hour)
February 22	Dichen Lachman	Actress
February 25	Maria Kanellis	Actress
February 25	Bert McCracken	Singer
February 28	Diane Macedo	American news personality
March 1	Alexis Fields	Actress (Roc, Sister, Sister, Kenan & Kel, Moesha)
March 2	Ben Roethlisberger	American football quarterback
March 3	Jessica Biel	Actress (7th Heaven)
March 3	Mercedes Mason	Actress
March 10	Thomas Middleditch	Canadian actor (Silicon Valley, Penn Zero: Part-Time Hero)
March 11	Lindsey McKeon	Actress (Saved by the Bell: The New Class, One Tree Hill)
March 11	Robbie Daymond	Voice actor (Breadwinners, Sailor Moon, Get Blake!, OK K.O.! Let's Be Heroes, Spider-Man, Pinky Malinky)
March 11	Thora Birch	Actress (The Outer Limits)
March 11	Mircea Monroe	Actress
March 12	Samm Levine	American actor
March 12	Luis Gerardo Méndez	Actor
March 14	Kate Maberly	Actress
March 16	Julie Pace	American journalist
March 18	Adam Pally	American actor
March 18	Cornelius Smith Jr.	American actor
March 19	Amanda Kloots	American dancer
March 20	Nick Blood	English actor (Agents of S.H.I.E.L.D.)
March 20	Erica Luttrell	Voice actress (The Magic School Bus, Dave the Barbarian, Steven Universe)
March 21	Santino Fontana	American actor
March 22	Constance Wu	Actress (Fresh Off the Boat)
March 24	James Napier Robertson	New Zealand actor (Power Rangers Dino Thunder)
March 25	Sean Faris	Actor (Life as We Know It, Pretty Little Liars)
March 25	Jenny Slate	Actress, comedian (Saturday Night Live, Bob's Burgers, Star vs. the Forces of Evil, Muppet Babies)
March 25	Alex Moffat	Actor, comedian (Saturday Night Live)
March 25	Danica Patrick	American former professional racing driver
March 26	Joe Anderson	Actor
March 28	Flula Borg	Actor
March 30	Jason Dohring	Actor (Veronica Mars)
March 30	Kenric Green	Actor
March 31	Anna Mae Routledge	Actress
March 31	Brian Tyree Henry	Actor
April 1	Taran Killam	Actor, comedian (The Amanda Show, Wild 'n Out, Mad TV, Saturday Night Live)
April 1	Sam Huntington	Actor
April 3	Cobie Smulders	Canadian actress (How I Met Your Mother) and model
April 5	Hayley Atwell	English actress (Agent Carter, Conviction) and singer
April 6	Bret Harrison	Actor (Grounded for Life, The Loop, Reaper, Breaking In)
April 10	Chyler Leigh	Actress (Grey's Anatomy, Supergirl)
April 10	Joanna Christie	Actress
April 15	Seth Rogen	Canadian-American actor, comedian (Freaks and Geeks, Saturday Night Live)
April 16	Gina Carano	American actress
April 18	Abigail Hawk	Actress
April 19	Ali Wong	American actress
April 22	Cassidy Freeman	Actress (Smallville, Longmire)
April 24	Kelly Clarkson	Singer and actress (American Idol, The Kelly Clarkson Show, The Voice)
April 26	Cedric Sanders	Actor
April 27	Katrina Johnson	Actress (All That)
April 28	Harry Shum, Jr.	Actor (Glee, Shadowhunters)
April 30	Drew Seeley	Canadian-American actor (Glory Daze)
April 30	Joseph Perrino	American actor
April 30	Kirsten Dunst	Actress (Star Trek: The Next Generation, Fargo)
May 1	Jamie Dornan	Northern Irish actor (Once Upon a Time)
May 2	Poppy Harlow	American journalist
May 3	Rebecca Hall	Actress
May 4	Charissa Thompson	TV host
May 6	Lindsay Pulsipher	Actress (Law & Order: Special Victims Unit, True Blood, The Beast)
May 6	Tiffany Coyne	Model
May 9	Rachel Boston	Actress (American Dreams, Witches of East End)
May 11	Cory Monteith	Actor (Glee) (d. 2013)
May 13	Ana Cabrera	Journalist
May 14	Anjelah Johnson	Actress (Mad TV)
May 15	Alexandra Breckenridge	Actress (Family Guy)
May 16	Tiya Sircar	Actress
May 24	Chaunté Wayans	Actress
May 25	Fryda Wolff	Actress (The Owl House, Trolls: The Beat Goes On!)
May 27	Natalya Neidhart	Pro Wrestler (Total Divas)
May 28	Alexa Davalos	Actress (Reunion, The Man in the High Castle)
May 29	Joanne Borgella	Reality TV personality (American Idol (season 7), Made, Mo'Nique's Fat Chance) (d. 2014)
May 31	Jonathan Tucker	Actor
June 2	Jewel Staite	Canadian actress (Firefly, Stargate Atlantis)
June 2	Whitney Able	Actress
June 8	Thomas Hobson	Actor (The Fresh Beat Band, That Girl Lay Lay)
June 14	Lawrence Saint-Victor	Actor (Guiding Light)
June 16	Missy Peregrym	Canadian actress (Life as We Know It, Reaper, Rookie Blue)
June 17	Arthur Darvill	English actor (Legends of Tomorrow)
June 19	Michael Yarmush	Actor
June 20	Necar Zadegan	Actress
June 21	Jussie Smollett	Actor (On Our Own, Empire, Underground)
June 25	Whit Johnson	American journalist
June 29	Lily Rabe	Actress (American Horror Story)
June 29	Colin Jost	Actor, comedian (Saturday Night Live)
June 30	Lizzy Caplan	Actress (Related, The Class, Party Down, Masters of Sex)
July 1	Hilarie Burton	Actress (One Tree Hill)
July 4	Michael Sorrentino	TV personality (Jersey Shore)
July 8	Sophia Bush	Actress (One Tree Hill, Chicago P.D.)
July 8	Ariel Helwani	Canadian-American combat sports analyst
July 10	Morgan Ortagus	American television commentator
July 13	Aya Cash	American actress
July 18	Ryan Cabrera	American musician
July 19	Jared Padalecki	Actor (Gilmore Girls, Supernatural)
July 20	Percy Daggs III	Actor (Veronica Mars)
July 22	David Fynn	Actor
July 23	Paul Wesley	Actor (American Dreams, The Vampire Diaries)
July 23	Tom Mison	English actor (Sleepy Hollow)
July 24	Anna Paquin	Canadian actress (True Blood)
July 24	Elisabeth Moss	Actress (The West Wing, Mad Men)
July 24	Lauren Miller Rogen	Actress
July 25	Brad Renfro	Actor (d. 2008)
July 26	Megan Ketch	Actress
July 28	Tom Pelphrey	Actor (Guiding Light, Iron Fist)
July 29	Allison Mack	Actress (Smallville, Wilfred)
July 30	Martin Starr	Actor (Freaks and Geeks, Party Down, Silicon Valley)
July 30	Yvonne Strahovski	Actress (HeadLand, Chuck)
July 30	Brandon Scott	Actor (This Is Us, Dead to Me, 13 Reasons Why)
August 1	Julia Ioffe	American journalist
August 3	Aron Stevens	Pro wrestler
August 6	Romola Garai	Actress
August 7	Abbie Cornish	Actress (Outriders)
August 7	Brit Marling	Actress (Babylon, The OA)
August 9	Jes Macallan	Actress (Mistresses)
August 10	Katrina Begin	Actress
August 10	Vincent Rodriguez III	Actor
August 11	Amanda Sudano	Singer
August 12	River Butcher	Actor
August 13	Sebastian Stan	Actor
August 16	Todd Haberkorn	Voice actor (Ever After High, Ben 10)
August 16	Cam Gigandet	Actor
August 17	Mark Salling	Actor (Glee) (d. 2018)
August 17	Jon Lovett	Comedian
August 19	Erika Christensen	Actress (Six Degrees, Parenthood) and singer
August 19	Melissa Fumero	Actress (One Life to Live, Brooklyn Nine-Nine)
August 20	Meghan Ory	Canadian actress (Once Upon a Time)
August 20	Jamil Walker Smith	Actor (Hey Arnold!, Waynehead, Stargate Universe)
August 25	Benjamin Diskin	Voice actor (Hey Arnold!, Codename: Kids Next Door, The Spectacular Spider-Man, Stitch!, Hulk and the Agents of S.M.A.S.H., Ultimate Spider-Man, Miraculous: Tales of Ladybug & Cat Noir, Muppet Babies, The Adventures of Rocky and Bullwinkle)
August 26	John Mulaney	Actor
August 27	Leah McSweeney	American television personality
August 29	Echo Kellum	Actor (Ben and Kate, Arrow, Sean Saves the World)
September 1	Zoe Lister-Jones	Actress (Delocated, Whitney, Friends with Better Lives, Life in Pieces)
September 4	Whitney Cummings	Comedian and actress (Whitney)
September 5	Hallie Haglund	Comedian
September 8	Chumlee	American businessman
September 10	Bret Iwan	Voice actor (current voice of Mickey Mouse)
September 10	Misty Copeland	Actress
September 13	J. G. Quintel	Voice actor (Regular Show)
September 17	Jillian Mele	News anchor
September 19	Columbus Short	Actor
September 20	Jessica Pimentel	Actress
September 22	Katie Lowes	Actress
September 22	Billie Piper	Actress
September 23	Alyssa Sutherland	Australian actress (Vikings)
September 23	Pendleton Ward	Voice actor (Adventure Time)
September 24	Tom Degnan	Actor
September 27	Anna Camp	Actress (The Mindy Project)
September 28	Matt Cohen	Actor (South of Nowhere)
September 29	Stephen "tWitch" Boss	Actor (died 2022)
September 30	Kieran Culkin	Actor (Long Live the Royals)
September 30	Lacey Chabert	Actress (Party of Five, The Wild Thornberrys, Family Guy, The Spectacular Spider-Man, Young Justice, Transformers: Rescue Bots, Shimmer and Shine, The Lion Guard, Justice League Action)
October 3	Erik von Detten	Actor (Recess, Odd Man Out, So Weird, The Legend of Tarzan, Complete Savages)
October 6	Mike Mitchell	Actor
October 9	Michael Arden	Actor
October 9	Colin Donnell	Actor (Arrow, The Affair, Chicago Med)
October 11	Humphrey Ker	Actor
October 12	Sarah Smyth	Actress
October 15	Lane Toran	Voice actor (Arnold on Hey Arnold! (1996–97))
October 15	Brandon Jay McLaren	Actor
October 16	Pippa Black	Actress
October 19	Gillian Jacobs	Actress (Community, Love) and singer
October 20	Katie Featherston	Actress (Paranormal Activity)
October 28	Michael Stahl-David	Actor
October 30	Clémence Poésy	French actress (The Tunnel)
November 1	Michaela Dietz	Actress (Steven Universe, Barney & Friends, The Ghost and Molly McGee)
November 10	Heather Matarazzo	Actress
November 12	Anne Hathaway	Actress (Get Real)
November 14	Laura Ramsey	Actress (Hindsight)
November 18	Damon Wayans Jr.	Actor (New Girl, Happy Endings, Happy Together)
November 21	Paul W. Downs	Actor
November 21	Ryan Starr	Reality TV personality (American Idol, The Surreal Life)
November 25	Natalia Cordova-Buckley	Mexican actress (Agents of S.H.I.E.L.D.)
November 25	Marci Gonzalez	Reporter for CBS News
November 26	Jessica Camacho	Actress
November 28	Adam McArthur	Voice actor (Star vs. the Forces of Evil)
November 28	Alan Ritchson	Actor
November 29	Gemma Chan	English actress (Dates, Humans)
November 29	Lucas Black	Actor (American Gothic, NCIS: New Orleans)
November 29	Eddie Spears	Actor
November 30	Elisha Cuthbert	Actress (Are You Afraid of the Dark?, 24, Happy Endings)
December 2	Streeter Seidell	Actor
December 5	Gabriel Luna	Actor (Agents of S.H.I.E.L.D.)
December 5	Alberto Guerra	Actor
December 6	C. J. Thomason	Actor
December 7	Jesse Johnson	Actor
December 7	Jack Huston	Actor
December 8	Nicki Minaj	Singer
December 14	Jesse Garcia	Actor
December 15	George O. Gore II	Actor (New York Undercover, My Wife and Kids)
December 16	Zoe Jarman	Actress
December 20	David Cook	Singer (American Idol)
December 21	Tom Payne	Actor
December 22	Harry Ford	Actor
December 28	Beau Garrett	Actress
December 29	Alison Brie	Actress and singer (Mad Men, Community, BoJack Horseman, GLOW)
December 30	Kristin Kreuk	Canadian actress (Edgemont, Smallville, Beauty & the Beast)
December 31	Jermaine Williams	Actor (The Jersey)

== Deaths ==
Date	Name	Age	Notability
January 1	Victor Buono	43	Actor (King Tut on Batman)
January 5	Hans Conried	64	Actor (Make Room for Daddy, The Rocky and Bullwinkle Show, Dr. Seuss special)
January 10	Paul Lynde	55	Actor (Bewitched), comedian (Hollywood Squares)
January 18	Trent Lehman	20	Child actor (Nanny and the Professor)
March 5	John Belushi	33	Comedian/Singer (Saturday Night Live)
May 14	Hugh Beaumont	73	Actor (Ward Cleaver on Leave It to Beaver)
July 21	Dave Garroway	69	Journalist and host (The Today Show)
July 23	Vic Morrow	53	Actor (Sgt. "Chip" Saunders on Combat!) killed by negligence of director John Landis on set of Twilight Zone: The Movie
August 12	Henry Fonda	77	Actor
August 13	Joe E. Ross	68	Actor (Gunther Toody on Car 54, Where Are You?)
October 18	Bess Truman	97	First Lady of the United States and spouse of President Harry S. Truman
November 1	James Broderick	55	Actor (Family) and father of Matthew Broderick
November 4	Dominique Dunne	22	Actress (Poltergeist) murdered by abusive boyfriend, first victim of the "Poltergeist curse"
December 7	Will Lee	74	Actor (Mr. Hooper on Sesame Street)
December 22	Jack Webb	62	Actor, producer (Sgt. Joe Friday on Dragnet)

== See also ==
- 1982 in the United States
- List of American films of 1982
