= Byron Cherry =

American actor

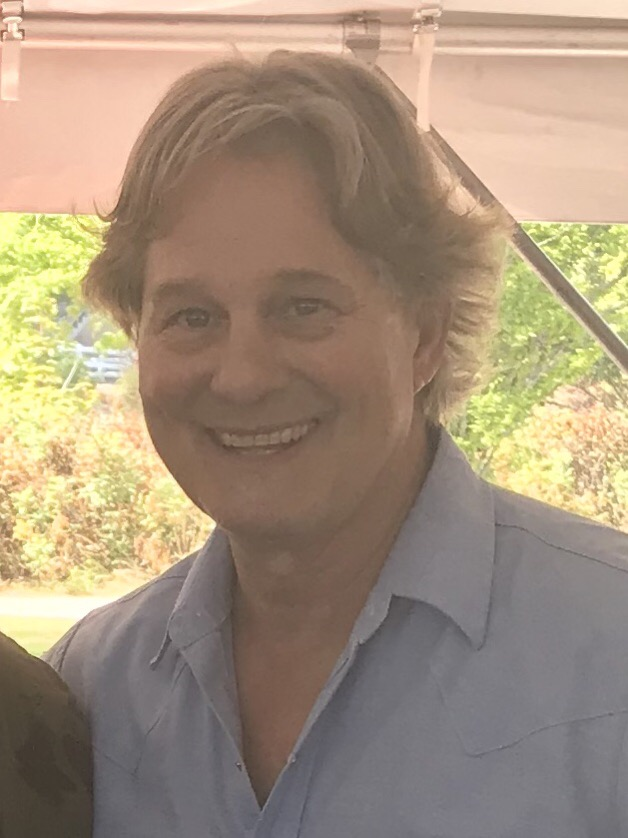
- Cherry at Ocean Beach Park in September 2019
- Born: Byron Wight Cherry; April 17, 1955 (age 70); Atlanta, Georgia, U.S.
- Occupation(s): Television actor, businessman
- Years active: 1980–present
- Known for: Coy Duke in The Dukes of Hazzard
- Spouse: Krista Laurie McLeod (m. 1995)
- Children: 2

Byron Wight Cherry (born April 17, 1955, in Atlanta, Georgia) is an American actor. He portrayed Coy Duke, one of the new Duke Boys, in the 1982–1983 season of The Dukes of Hazzard for the first 19 episodes of season 5.

== The Dukes of Hazzard ==
In 1978, Cherry, along with longtime friend John Schneider, auditioned for the part of Bo Duke on the upcoming Dukes of Hazzard. Schneider ended up winning the part, with which he found much success. A few years later, due to merchandising conflicts, Schneider and co-star Tom Wopat walked out on the show, and Cherry, along with Christopher Mayer, were called in to replace them as Coy and Vance Duke. Cherry and Mayer both debuted on Dukes in September 1982. Though resembling the familiar leads played by Wopat and Schneider, Cherry and Mayer's characters of Coy and Vance were not accepted by viewing audience, and ratings for the popular series began to sag during the 19 episodes in which they appeared. By the middle of the 1982–83 season, Warner Bros. came to new agreeable salary terms with Wopat and Schneider, and in February 1983, both of the original stars returned to the show. Cherry and Mayer appeared alongside Wopat and Schneider briefly in the episode of Bo and Luke's return, and then were written out of the show and never mentioned again.

== Later career ==
Under a three-year contract with Warner Bros., Cherry appeared on numerous television shows such as Murder, She Wrote, In the Heat of the Night, and Vietnam War Story, and in various TV commercials and guest spots on numerous talk shows. He was a spokesperson for the American Cancer Society.

== Filmography ==
Year	Title	Role	Notes
1982–83	The Dukes of Hazzard	Coy Duke	Main role (19 episodes)
1983	The Dukes	Coy Duke (voice)	Main role (13 episodes)
1984	Murder, She Wrote	Deputy Will Roxie	Episode: "It's a Dog's Life"
1985	The Fix	Esty	
1987	Vietnam War Story	Janner	Episode: "The Mine"
1989	In the Heat of the Night	Charlie Hobbs	Episode: "The Pig Woman of Sparta"
1990	Blood Salvage	Newlywed Man	
2005	The Gender Bowl	Football Player	TV movie
2018	3rd Eye	Miles Dennehy	
2019	Christmas Cars	Cousin Coy	
2020	Stand on It!	Byron Cherry	
2020	Go Fishin'	Game Warden B. Cherry	
2021	Poker Run	Coy Duke	
2021	Salvage Yard Shine Boys	Deputy Bubba Bradford	
2023	Midnight Massacre	Mayor Pompey	
