= The Dukes of Hazzard =

American action-comedy television series (1979–1985)

- Title card
- Genre: Action comedy Adventure; Comedy drama
- Created by: Gy Waldron
- Starring: Tom Wopat; John Schneider; Catherine Bach; Denver Pyle; Rick Hurst; Sonny Shroyer; Ben Jones; James Best; Sorrell Booke; Waylon Jennings; Byron Cherry; Christopher Mayer
- Narrated by: Waylon Jennings
- Opening theme: "Good Ol' Boys" performed by Waylon Jennings
- Country of origin: United States
- Original language: English
- No. of seasons: 7
- No. of episodes: 147 (list of episodes)

Production
- Camera setup: Single-camera
- Running time: 45–49 minutes
- Production companies: Paul R. Picard Productions (season 1); Piggy Productions, Inc. (season 1); Lou Step Productions (seasons 2–7); Warner Bros. Television

Original release
- Network: CBS
- Release: January 26, 1979 – February 8, 1985

Related
- Moonrunners (film); Smokey and the Bandit (film); Enos; The Dukes; The Dukes of Hazzard Reunion!; The Dukes of Hazzard: Hazzard in Hollywood; The Dukes of Hazzard (film); The Dukes of Hazzard: The Beginning

The Dukes of Hazzard is an American action comedy television series created by Gy Waldron that aired on CBS from 1979 to 1985, with seven seasons and a total of 147 episodes. It was consistently among the top-viewed television series in the late 1970s and early 1980s, at one point, ranking second only to Dallas, which immediately followed the show on CBS's Friday night schedule.

The show's ensemble cast is about two young male cousins, Bo Duke and Luke Duke, who live in rural Georgia and are on probation for moonshine-running. Probation prevents the "Duke Boys" from owning guns, and they are armed with bows and arrows (which are sometimes tipped with dynamite) and clever plans to outwit a corrupt sheriff and greedy rich "city slickers." They and their family (cousin Daisy Duke and patriarch Uncle Jesse Duke) live on a small farm on the outskirts of town, where they plan various escapades to expose and evade county commissioner Boss Hogg and law officer Sheriff Rosco P. Coltrane. The "Duke Boys" drive a customized 1969 Dodge Charger nicknamed the General Lee, which became a symbol of the show.

The series was inspired by the 1975 film Moonrunners, about a bootlegger family, which Waldron wrote and directed and had many identical or similar character names and concepts.

The show was followed by four films, The Dukes of Hazzard: Reunion! (1997), The Dukes of Hazzard: Hazzard in Hollywood (2000), The Dukes of Hazzard (2005), and The Dukes of Hazzard: The Beginning (2007).

== Plot ==
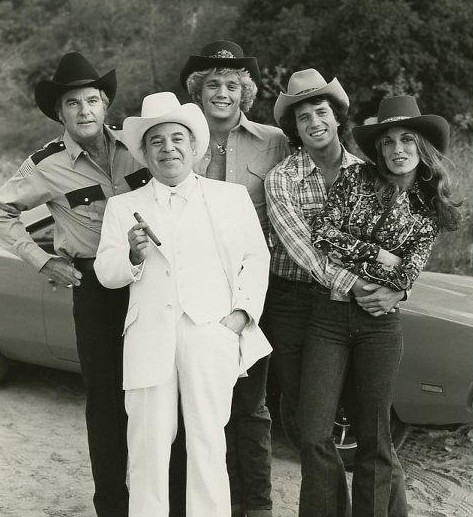
The cast of The Dukes of Hazzard in 1979. From left to right: James Best, Sorrell Booke, John Schneider, Tom Wopat and Catherine Bach.

The Dukes of Hazzard follows the adventures of "the Duke boys", primarily cousins Bo Duke (John Schneider) and Luke Duke (Tom Wopat) (but alternatively Coy and Vance Duke for most of season 5), who live on a family farm in fictional Hazzard County, Georgia (the exact location of which is never specified, though Atlanta is mentioned several times as the nearest big city), with their cousin Daisy (Catherine Bach) and their wise old Uncle Jesse (Denver Pyle). The Duke boys race around in their customized 1969 Dodge Charger stock car, dubbed (The) General Lee, evading crooked and corrupt county commissioner Jefferson Davis (J.D.) "Boss" Hogg (Sorrell Booke) and his bumbling and corrupt ally Sheriff Rosco P. Coltrane (James Best) along with his deputy(s), and always managing to get caught in the middle of various local escapades and incidents.

It was explained that Bo and Luke were previously sentenced to probation for illegal transportation of moonshine as their Uncle Jesse made a plea bargain with the U.S. government to refrain from distilling moonshine in exchange for Bo and Luke's freedom. As a result, Bo and Luke are on probation and not allowed to carry firearms—instead, they often use compound bows, sometimes with arrows tipped with dynamite—or to leave Hazzard County unless they get permission from their appointed probation officer Boss Hogg. The details of their probation terms vary from episode to episode. Sometimes it is implied that they would be jailed for merely crossing the county line, or in other episodes the state line. On other occasions, it is shown that they may leave Hazzard as long as they are back within a certain time. Several other technicalities of their probation come into play at various times.

"Boss" Hogg either runs or has his fingers in virtually everything in Hazzard County. Hogg is forever angry at the Dukes, especially Bo and Luke, for their habit of foiling his crooked schemes. Many episodes revolve around Hogg's attempts to engage in some such scheme, sometimes with the aid of hired criminal help.

Some of these are get-rich-quick schemes, but many others affect the financial security of the Duke farm, which Hogg has long wanted to acquire for various reasons. Other times, Hogg hires criminals from out of town to do his dirty work for him and he often tries to frame Bo and Luke as part of these plots. Bo and Luke always seem to stumble over Hogg's latest scheme, sometimes by curiosity, and often by sheer luck, and quash it. Despite the Dukes often coming to his rescue, Hogg never loses his irrational dislike of the clan, particularly Bo and Luke, often accusing them of spying on him, robbing or planning to rob him, or other nefarious actions.

Hogg was played by Sorrell Booke, who performed frequently on radio, stage, and film before his role in The Dukes of Hazzard. Hogg is one of only two characters to appear in every episode of the series, the other being Uncle Jesse Duke. Daisy Duke appears in all but one episode (season 3's "To Catch a Duke").

The show's other main characters include local mechanic Cooter Davenport (Ben Jones), who in early episodes was portrayed as a wild, unshaven rebel, often breaking or treading on the edge of the law, before settling down to become the Duke family's best friend (often called an "honorary Duke") and owning the local garage. Enos Strate (Sonny Shroyer) is an honest but naïve young deputy who, despite his friendship with the Dukes (and his crush on Daisy), is reluctantly forced to take part in Hogg and Rosco's crooked schemes. In the third and fourth seasons when Shroyer left for his own show, his character was replaced by Boss Hogg's cousin Deputy Cletus Hogg (Rick Hurst) who is slightly wilier than Enos but still a somewhat reluctant player in Hogg's plots.

Owing to their fundamentally good natures, the Dukes often wind up helping Boss Hogg out of trouble, albeit grudgingly. More than once, Hogg is targeted by former associates who are either seeking revenge or have double-crossed him after a scheme has unraveled. Sheriff Coltrane also finds himself targeted in some instances. On such occasions, Bo and Luke usually have to rescue their adversaries as an inevitable precursor to defeating the bad guys. In other instances, the Dukes join forces with Hogg and Coltrane to tackle bigger threats to Hazzard or one of their respective parties. These instances became more frequent as the show progressed, and later seasons saw a number of stories where the Dukes, Hogg, and Coltrane temporarily work together.

== Production ==
The series was developed from the 1975 film Moonrunners, which was written and directed by Gy Waldron. Waldron was originally from Lenoxburg, Kentucky and had grown up around stock car racing culture. The film was based on the real life of Jerry Rushing, a former moonshiner from Taylorsville, North Carolina. Rushing and his brother Johnny had raced and run moonshine for their uncle in North Carolina during the 1950s, and were often accompanied by their cousin Delane. Rushing owned a 1958 Chrysler named "Traveller", after the famous horse owned by General Robert E. Lee. These events from Rushing's life formed the basis of Waldron's film. Moonrunners follows the exploits of the Hagg brothers, Bobby and Grady Lee who owned a stock car named "Traveller", after Rushing's car. The Hagg brothers ran moonshine for their uncle Jesse Hagg.

In 1977, Waldron was approached by Warner Bros. with the idea of developing Moonrunners into a television series. The network was inspired by the success of Smokey and the Bandit. Elements from Smokey and the Bandit influenced the Dukes of Hazzard, such as Sally Field's character in the film, whose costuming was notably similar to Daisy Duke and featured small shorts. Waldron reworked various elements from Moonrunners, ultimately devising what became The Dukes of Hazzard. Bobby Hagg was developed into the character of Bo Duke, Grady Lee was developed into Luke Duke, and Jesse Hagg became Jesse Duke. Their car was renamed "General Lee", referencing the "Traveller" from Moonrunners. The show was more family-friendly than Waldron's original film, with a heavier emphasis on comedy and less emphasis on the illegal or immoral actions of its protagonists.

Production began in October 1978 with the original intention of only nine episodes for a mid-season filler. The first five episodes were filmed in Covington and Conyers, Georgia and surrounding areas, including some location work in nearby Atlanta. After completing production on the fifth episode, "High Octane", the cast and crew broke for Christmas break, expecting to return in several weeks to complete the ordered run of episodes. In the meantime, executives at Warner Bros. were impressed by the rough preview cuts of the completed episodes and saw potential in developing the show into a full-running series. Part of this plan was to move production from Georgia to the Warner Bros. lot in Burbank, California, to simplify production as well as develop a larger workshop to service the large number of automobiles needed for the series.

Rushing was initially unaware of the show's development, and received no compensation from it. He successfully sued for compensation and agreed to appear on the show afterwards in minor parts. Rushing appeared as shady used car dealer Ace Parker in the fourth episode, "Repo Men". Rushing believed this to be the start of a recurring role, in return for which he would supply creative ideas from his experiences: many of the Dukes (and thus Moonrunners) characters and situations were derived from Rushing's experiences as a youth, and much of the character of Bo Duke, he states to be based on him. However, "Repo Men" turned out to be the character's only appearance in the show's run, leading to a legal dispute in the following years over the rights to characters and concepts. Despite this, Rushing remained on good terms with cast and crew and in recent years has made appearances at several fan conventions.

By the end of the first (half) season, the family-friendly tone of The Dukes of Hazzard was mostly in place. When the show returned for a second season in the fall of 1979 (its first full season), with a few further minor tweaks, it quickly found its footing as a family-friendly comedy-adventure series. By the third season, starting in the fall of 1980, the template which would be widely associated with the show was evident.

As well as car chases, jumps and stunts, The Dukes of Hazzard relied on character familiarity, with each character effectively serving the same role within a typical episode. Deputy Cletus replaced Deputy Enos in seasons 3 and 4, and Coy and Vance Duke temporarily replaced Bo and Luke (due to a salary dispute) for most of season 5, but these were the only major cast changes through the show's run. Only Uncle Jesse and Boss Hogg appeared in all 145 episodes; Daisy appears in all but one, the third season's "To Catch a Duke." The General Lee appears in all episodes except the third episode of season one, "Mary Kaye's Baby".

The show was largely filmed in Hidden Valley in Thousand Oaks, California, with scenes also shot at nearby Lake Sherwood and at Paramount Ranch in nearby Agoura Hills.

== Episodes ==
Season	Episodes	Originally released	
Season	Episodes	First released	Last released
1	13	January 26, 1979	May 11, 1979
2	25	September 21, 1979	April 20, 1980
3	21	November 5, 1980	April 10, 1981
4	27	October 9, 1981	April 2, 1982
5	22	September 24, 1982	March 25, 1983
6	22	September 23, 1983	March 30, 1984
7	17	September 21, 1984	February 8, 1985

The show ran for seven seasons and a total of 147 episodes. Many of the episodes followed a similar structure "out-of-town crooks pull a robbery or commit a crime or scandal, Duke boys blamed, spend the rest of the hour clearing their names, the General Lee flies and the squad cars crash".

== Cast and characters ==
Cast of The Dukes of Hazzard (from left): (bottom) John Schneider, Tom Wopat, Catherine Bach, Denver Pyle, Peggy Rea; (top) Ben Jones, Sorrell Booke, James Best, Sonny Shroyer

Character	Portrayed by	Season							Reunion!	Hazzard in Hollywood
Character	Portrayed by	1	2	3	4	5	6	7	Reunion!	Hazzard in Hollywood
Luke Duke	Tom Wopat	Main	Main	Main	Main	Recurring	Main	Main	Main	Main
Bo Duke	John Schneider	Main	Main	Main	Main	Recurring	Main	Main	Main	Main
Daisy Duke	Catherine Bach	Main	Main	Main	Main	Main	Main	Main	Main	Main
Jesse Duke	Denver Pyle	Main	Main	Main	Main	Main	Main	Main	Main	
Sheriff Rosco P. Coltrane	James Best	Main	Main	Main	Main	Main	Main	Main	Main	Main
Boss Hogg	Sorrell Booke	Main	Main	Main	Main	Main	Main	Main		
Cooter Davenport	Ben Jones	Main	Main	Main	Main	Main	Main	Main	Main	Main
Deputy Enos Strate	Sonny Shroyer	Main	Main	Recurring		Main	Main	Main	Main	Main
The Balladeer	Waylon Jennings	Main	Main	Main	Main	Main	Main	Main		
Deputy Cletus Hogg	Rick Hurst	Recurring	Recurring	Main	Main	Guest			Main	Main
Coy Duke	Byron Cherry					Main				
Vance Duke	Christopher Mayer					Main				

=== Main characters ===
- Lucas K. "Luke" Duke (portrayed by Tom Wopat) is the dark-haired, older Duke boy. He wears a checked blue shirt and a denim jacket over it in first season and a few later second-season episodes. Luke is a veteran of the United States Marine Corps and a former boxer. He is typically the one who thinks of the plan that will get himself and his cousin Bo out of whatever trouble they have gotten into. Luke acted hypocritically on occasion, most prominently in season 1 episode 6 "Swamp Molly". Luke was the first Duke to perform the "hood slide" across the General Lee, which is seen in the opening credits of the show (a shot taken from the second episode, "Daisy's Song"). According to Wopat the slide was an accident, because his foot got caught on the side of the General Lee when he attempted to jump across the hood; he also caught his arm on the hood's radio antenna, resulting in such antennas being removed from later versions of the General Lee. However, the "hood slide" quickly proved popular and became a regular staple of the rest of the episodes. The only episode to directly refer to the age difference between Luke and Bo is in the seventh-season opener, the "flashback" episode "Happy Birthday, General Lee", where it is stated that Luke had already been in the Marines while Bo was in his last year at high school. The Duke boys share the CB call sign or handle "Lost Sheep".
- Beauregard "Bo" Duke (portrayed by John Schneider) is the blond-haired, younger Duke boy, and the more impulsive one of the pair. He often reacted to situations without thinking, sometimes with an "act/speak now, think later" attitude. This trait was an advantage at most times, since it made him willing to dive into dangerous situations without any regard for his safety, however he bit off more than he could chew a few times. In the first-season episode "High Octane", his actual first name is revealed to be Beauregard. An ex-stock car driver and superior driver to his cousin Luke, Bo is the one who drives the General Lee most of the time, with Luke riding shotgun. Bo was also the first Duke to jump the General Lee. He and Luke take turns of driving the General Lee in some episodes as they share the car with each other (very early episodes suggest that it belongs solely to him; Luke is said to have a car that Cooter had wrecked shortly prior to the start of the opening episode, "One Armed Bandits"). Bo is known for his rebel yell, "Yeeeee-haaa," which he usually yells when the General Lee is airborne during a jump. Bo was the only Duke to perform a roof slide (sliding over the roof of the car rather than just the hood), as seen in the season 4 episodes "Dear Diary" and "Share and Share Alike". Bo usually wears a cream-yellow shirt; for the first two seasons he wears a blue T-shirt underneath (brown in the first episode). This was slowly phased out during the third season. The Duke boys share the CB call sign or handle "Lost Sheep".
- Daisy Duke (portrayed by Catherine Bach) is Bo, Luke, Coy, and Vance's cousin. She is beautiful, honest, and kind, although she can be slightly over-trusting and naïve, which has led the Duke family into trouble on a number of occasions. She sometimes aspires to be a songwriter and singer, and at other times, a reporter. Daisy races around Hazzard with her cousins, first in a yellow and black 1974 Plymouth Road Runner (later a 1971 Plymouth Satellite was used) and then, from mid-season 2 on, in her trademark white 1980 Jeep CJ-7, christened Dixie with a golden eagle emblem on the hood (and the name "Dixie" on the hood sides). Daisy works as a waitress at the Boar's Nest, the local bar and pub owned by Boss Hogg, as part of an agreement with Boss Hogg so that he would give Uncle Jesse and the boys a loan for a lower interest rate so the boys could purchase the entry fee for a race in which they wished to race the General Lee. The arrangement was supposed to be for an indefinite time, but there are several times throughout the series when Hogg fires her. However, he always ends up rehiring her at the end of each episode because of various circumstances. Although Hogg is a nemesis to Daisy and her family, she is friends with Hogg's wife Lulu. Daisy often uses her charming personality and sex appeal to influence male policemen or henchmen into going easier on other Duke family members and/or cause them to become too distracted to carry out their assigned duties or evil plans. Daisy also utilizes her position at the restaurant to get insider information to help the Dukes in foiling Hogg's various schemes. She also has the distinction of having her trademark high-cut jean shorts. The character was originally intended to wear ruffled skirts, but on the first day of filming Bach brought a costume that she had designed based on a pair of jean shorts, a T-shirt, and high heels. It was inspired by the actual clothes that Bach had seen waitresses wear at roadhouses in Georgia. This style of shorts became colloquially called "daisy dukes" in American culture. Her CB handle is "Bo Peep". Occasionally, the variant "Country Cousin" is used.
- Jesse Duke (portrayed by Denver Pyle), referred to by just about everyone in Hazzard other than Boss Hogg as "Uncle Jesse", is a farmer, the patriarch of the Duke clan, and the father figure to all of the Dukes who stay with him on the Duke farm. Jesse apparently has at least five siblings but no children of his own and he happily provides for his nephews and niece in the unexplained absence of all of their parents. Gy Waldron, the creator of the show, states on the DVDs that their parents were killed in a car wreck, but it was never mentioned in the show. In the third broadcast episode titled "Mary Kaye's Baby", Jesse says that he has delivered many babies, including Bo and Luke. Jesse Duke, in his youth, had been a ridgerunner in direct competition with Boss Hogg, whom he always calls "J.D.". However, while both Boss Hogg and Uncle Jesse would scowl at the mention of the other's name, the two enjoyed a lifelong "friendship" of sorts, with one helping the other when in desperate need. Jesse educated his nephews against Hogg, and often provides the cousins with inspirational sage advice. Uncle Jesse drives a white 1973 Ford F-100 pickup truck. In the barn, he also has his old moonshine-running car, called Sweet Tillie in its first appearance (in the first-season episode "High Octane"), but referred to as Black Tillie in subsequent appearances. In the second-season episode "Follow That Still" and the sixth-season episode "The Boar's Nest Bears", the marriage to, and death of, his wife is mentioned; he also mentions marrying her in the first-season episode "Luke's Love Story". His CB handle is "Shepherd", a reference to his always seeking out and saving his "lost sheep"—Bo and Luke—from their various mishaps.
- Sheriff Rosco P. Coltrane (portrayed by James Best) is the bumbling and corrupt sheriff of Hazzard County and right-hand man/brother-in-law of its corrupt county administrator Jefferson Davis "J.D." Hogg ("Boss Hogg") whom Rosco calls his "little fat buddy", "Little Chrome Dome", "Little Meadow-Muffin", and several other names. In the early episodes, it is mentioned that Rosco spent the first 20 years of his career as a mostly honest lawman, but after the county voted away his pension, Rosco joined Hogg in an effort to fund his retirement in his last couple of years as sheriff. Early episodes also portray him as a fairly hard-nosed, somewhat darker policeman character, who even shoots a criminal during the first season. As the series progressed and producers recognized how popular it had become with children, Best altered his portrayal into a more bumbling, comical character. By the end of the first season, his origin had been virtually forgotten (and his job as sheriff appeared to become open-ended). Rosco is also the younger brother of Lulu Coltrane Hogg (Boss Hogg's wife). Rosco frequently initiates car chases with Bo and Luke Duke, but the Duke boys usually elude Rosco by outwitting him, with Rosco typically wrecking his patrol car as a result from which he would nearly always escape unscathed. Only two episodes—the fourth season's "Coltrane vs. Duke" and the sixth season's "Too Many Roscos"—toy with the concept of him being injured. The first episode has him faking injury so that the Duke boys would lose the General Lee while the latter has Best playing two characters. His normal character, Rosco, is presumed drowned while a criminal that looks like Rosco has a headache. These chases are often the result of Rosco setting up illegal speed traps such as false or changing speed limit signs and various other trickery, which became increasingly cartoonish and far-fetched as the seasons passed. While he enjoys "hot pursuit" he seemingly never intends for anyone to get seriously hurt. His middle initial, "P", was added at the start of the second season, and only one episode (the third season's "Mrs. Rosco P. Coltrane", in which he is subjected to a scam marriage) reveals his middle name, "Purvis". Rosco also has a soft spot for his Basset Hound Flash, introduced at the start of the third season. His radio codename is "Red Dog". When Best briefly boycotted the show during the mid-second season because of the bad changing room conditions, he was temporarily replaced by several "one-off" sheriffs, the longest standing being Sheriff Grady Bird, played by Dick Sargent, who appeared in two episodes ("Officer Daisy Duke" and "Jude Emery"). Best returned after the changing room conditions were taken care of.
- Boss Jefferson Davis "J.D." Hogg (portrayed by Sorrell Booke) is the wealthiest man in Hazzard County, and owns most of its property and businesses—whether directly or by holding the mortgages over the land. Usually dressed in an all-white suit, he is the fat, greedy, corrupt county commissioner with visions of grandeur and a voracious appetite for food, who constantly orders Rosco to "Get them Duke boys!" He is also Bo and Luke's probation officer for when Bo and Luke need to leave Hazzard, they always get permission from him. Boss Hogg is also married to (and dominated by) Rosco's "fat sister" Lulu Coltrane Hogg, a point that does not always sit well with either Boss Hogg or Rosco; Hogg sometimes claims that Rosco is indebted to him because of it, though his on-screen interactions with Lulu typically show him loving her deeply (and giving in to her stronger personality). In addition to his role as county commissioner, he is also the police commissioner, land commissioner, and bank president. Boss is also the fire chief of the Hazzard Fire Department and the owner of, or primary mortgage holder on, most of the places in the county, including the Boar's Nest, Rhubottem's Store, Cooter's garage and the Duke farm. It is implied in some episodes that he is the justice of the peace, but in others Hazzard relies on a circuit judge. In the episode "Coltrane vs. Duke", Hogg represents Rosco when he sues the Dukes, implying that he is a licensed attorney. His vehicle is a white 1970 Cadillac Coupe de Ville convertible, with bull horns mounted on the hood. In the first few seasons, he is almost always driven around by a chauffeur. His old moonshine-running car was called The Gray Ghost. Every morning, Boss Hogg would drink coffee and eat raw liver (Booke, a method actor, actually ate the raw liver). Booke based the voice of Boss Hogg off of South Carolina senator Strom Thurmond. Boss Hogg is described in one analysis as "an ineffectual bad guy—hence amusing". Booke also plays Boss Hogg's benevolent identical twin brother Abraham Lincoln Hogg in one episode.
- Cooter Davenport (portrayed by Ben Jones) is the Hazzard County mechanic, nicknamed "Crazy Cooter" (a "cooter" is a large freshwater turtle, common in the southeastern U.S.). In the early episodes, he is a wild man, often breaking the law. By the end of the first season, he has settled down and become an easygoing good ol' boy. Although not mentioned in the first couple of episodes, by the mid-first season, he owns "Cooter's Garage" in Hazzard County Square, directly across from the Sheriff's Department. Cooter is an "honorary Duke" as he shares the same values and often assists the Dukes in escaping Rosco's clutches or helps them to foil Boss Hogg's schemes. During the second season, Jones left the series for a few episodes due to a dispute over whether the character should be clean-shaven or have a full beard. In his absence, Cooter's place was filled by several of Cooter's supposed cousins who were never mentioned before or since. Jones returned when the dispute was solved—Cooter would be clean-shaven (although, for continuity reasons, with the episodes being broadcast in a different order to that which they were filmed, he was not clean-shaven until the third season onwards). Cooter drives a variety of trucks, including Fords, Chevys, and GMCs. His CB handle is "Crazy Cooter" and he often starts his CB transmissions with "Breaker one, Breaker one, I might be crazy but I ain't dumb, Craaaazy Cooter comin' atcha, come on."
- Deputy Enos Strate (portrayed by Sonny Shroyer) is a friend of the Dukes but, while working for Rosco and Boss, he is often forced into pursuing the Dukes and/or arresting them on trumped-up charges. In the early episodes, Enos is shown to be a rather good driver (and respected as such by Bo and Luke) but, by the end of the first season, he is shown to be as incompetent a driver as Rosco. His common catchphrase is "Possum on a gumbush!" When he returns from his stint in Los Angeles, he seems to be able to stand up to Boss and Rosco slightly more, and sometimes refuses to participate in their schemes. In the early episodes, Rosco frequently calls him "jackass", which soon evolved into the more family-friendly "dipstick" as the show became a hit with younger viewers (though Boss Hogg, who also used the term "jackass" to berate Sheriff Rosco, occasionally returned to calling Enos this in later seasons). Enos has a crush on Daisy Duke that she often uses to the Dukes' advantage in unraveling Hogg and Rosco's schemes. Enos is very much in love with Daisy, and although Daisy seems to love him back, it is supposedly only as a close friend. In the penultimate episode, "Enos and Daisy's Wedding", the two plan on getting married, only to have Enos call it off at the last minute due to an attack of hives, brought on by the excitement of possibly being married to Daisy. Later, in the first reunion movie, Enos and Daisy become a pair again and plan to get married, but this time Daisy backs out at the last minute upon the unexpected sight of her ex-husband.
- Deputy Cletus Hogg (portrayed by Rick Hurst) is Boss Hogg's second cousin-twice-removed who is generally friendly and dim-witted. Like Enos, Cletus is often forced by Rosco and Hogg to chase the Dukes on trumped up charges. While Cletus is good-hearted, and sometimes resentful of having to treat the Dukes in such a way, he is somewhat more willing to go along with Hogg and Rosco than Enos. Cletus has a crush (though not as bad as Enos' crush) on Daisy and is even convinced she wants to marry him. Like Enos and Rosco, Cletus frequently ends up landing in a pond when pursuing the Duke boys in a car chase. Cletus makes his first appearance as the driver of a bank truck, part of Hogg's latest get-rich-quick scheme, in the first-season episode "Money To Burn", and becomes temporary deputy while Enos is away in the second-season episodes "The Meeting" and "Road Pirates". Leaving a job at the local junkyard, he becomes permanent deputy in the third season's "Enos Strate to the Top". After Enos' return, the pair both serve as deputies and share the same patrol car until the end of season five. Each of the Hazzard County Sheriff's Department officers drives various mid- to late-1970s Chrysler mid-size B body patrol cars, most often a Dodge Monaco or Plymouth Fury.
- Coy Duke (portrayed by Byron Cherry) is another blond-haired cousin who moves to Uncle Jesse's farm along with his cousin Vance after Bo and Luke left Hazzard to join the NASCAR circuit in season 5. Like his cousin Bo, he often drives the General Lee, is a bit wilder than Vance and chases women; he and Vance are only in the first 19 episodes of season 5 and Coy and Vance are in only one episode with their cousins Bo and Luke when they return from the NASCAR circuit. Supposedly, with cousin Vance, Coy had previously lived on the Duke farm until 1976, before the series had started.
- Vance Duke (portrayed by Christopher Mayer), an obvious replacement for Luke, filled the void of a dark-haired Duke on the show. Like Luke, Vance is more the thinker and the planner of the duo, along with being more mature than Coy. He is also a former Merchant Mariner.
- The Balladeer (voiced by Waylon Jennings) sings and plays the Dukes of Hazzard theme song, "Good Ol' Boys", and serves as the show's narrator. During each episode, he provides an omniscient viewpoint of the situations presented, and regularly interjects comical asides during crucial plot points (often, during a freeze frame of a cliffhanger scene right before a commercial break) and "down home" aphorisms (these freeze-frame cliffhangers were often abridged in showings in some countries, such as the commercial-free BBC in the United Kingdom). After numerous requests from fans to see the Balladeer on-screen, Jennings finally appeared in one episode, the seventh season's aptly titled "Welcome, Waylon Jennings" in which he was presented as an old friend of the Dukes.
- Flash (portrayed by Sandy and other dog actors) is a slow-paced Basset Hound and Rosco's loyal companion who hates Boss Hogg, but loves the Dukes. She first appeared in the first official third-season episode "Enos Strate to the Top" (the two-part third-season opener "Carnival of Thrills" was held over from the previous season), although the dog was not formally "introduced" in that episode. Initially referred to as a boy, Flash is later regularly a girl (despite an occasional male reference afterwards). Flash was added at the start of the third season after James Best suggested to the producers that Rosco have a dog. Rosco doted on Flash, often calling her "Velvet Ears". Flash was portrayed by several Basset Hounds during the series (distinguishable by different facial colors), the most regular being Sandy. James Best bought a share of Sandy, who was rescued from an animal shelter and was trained by Alvin Mears of Alvin Animal Rentals. Sandy lived to age 14. A stuffed dog named Flush was used for dangerous stunt work in a few episodes.

The pilot episode was to include a barber modeled after Floyd Lawson on The Andy Griffith Show as a regular character, but was eliminated when the final draft of the pilot's script was written and before the show was cast.

=== Recurring characters ===
Character	Actor
Info
Lulu Coltrane Hogg	Peggy Rea
Boss Hogg's wife, Hughie Hogg's aunt, and Rosco's sister. Lulu constantly challenged her husband for authority and rallied for the equality of women in Hazzard, and was one of the few people in Hazzard who actually intimidated Boss, though he genuinely loved and cared for her. Although much mentioned, Lulu only appeared once during the first season (in the episode "Repo Men") and once during the second season ("The Rustlers"), before her appearances gradually increased over the third season. By the fourth season, she was a frequently seen recurring character. Initially in her single first- and second-season appearances, she was portrayed to be rather spoiled and selfish; as her appearances increased, the character evolved into being more caring and kind—often in contrast to Boss, and which on occasion proved to be his downfall or his Achilles' heel. Although Boss is a nemesis to the Dukes, Lulu is best friends with Daisy.
Myrtle / Mabel Tillingham	Lindsay Bloom
Mabel is Hogg's cousin who runs the Hazzard Phone Company. She often sneak-listens to calls and lets Hogg know what is going on. Her name mysteriously changed from Myrtle to Mabel midway through the second season.
Longstreet B. Davenport	Ernie Lively (credited as Ernie W. Brown)
L.B. was Cooter's cousin who filled for Cooter when he was away from "Cooter's Garage" in several second-season episodes (in reality, this was to cover for Ben Jones's absence, after a disagreement with producers as to whether Cooter should have a beard or not). L.B. appeared in the episodes "Follow that Still", "Duke of Duke", and "The Runaway", before Jones returned to the series; the episode "Grannie Annie" also features another temporary Cooter replacement, Mickey Jones as B.B. Davenport. Ernie Lively also played a different character named "Dobro Doolan", a friend of Bo and Luke, in the first episode of the series "One Armed Bandits" (where he was credited as Ernie Brown) and as a vehicle impound security guard called Clyde in the later sixth-season episode "The Ransom of Hazzard County". With Cooter's temporary absence, it was never fully explained why one of his relations was suddenly running the garage in his place; and in a similar vein to Coy and Vance in the fifth season, both of these cousins of Cooter were very much clones of the original character, and were never mentioned before or after their temporary spells replacing the original character.
Hughie Hogg	Jeff Altman
A play-on-words of the popular military helicopter. Boss Hogg's young nephew, said to be as crooked as—maybe even more crooked than—Hogg. Dressed in an all-white suit just like his Uncle Boss, Hughie drove or was chauffeured around in a white VW Beetle with bull horns on the hood, similar to Boss Hogg's Cadillac. Typically, Boss Hogg would call in Hughie once per season to come up with a particularly dastardly scheme to get rid of the Dukes. Hughie's seemingly flawless plots always ended in disaster and Boss Hogg would throw him out of Hazzard at the end of the episode. Despite this, Hogg always gave Hughie "one last chance" on his next appearance. In later appearances, Hughie wormed his way back into Hazzard by coming up with a scheme and then persuading Hogg to go along with it, often by bribery. The character of Hughie was first introduced in the episode "Uncle Boss", produced as the second episode of the second season but not broadcast until the third season (for unknown reasons, and just several episodes prior to "The Return of Hughie Hogg"). By that time, Hughie had already been seen as Temporary Sheriff in the second-season episode "Arrest Jesse Duke", in which he appeared in a secondary role, written in at the last minute to cover Sheriff Rosco's absence during James Best's temporary boycott of the show. He acted somewhat out of character of his usual conniving self in the episode, due to being given most of Rosco's lines. Like the two Hazzard County deputies, Hughie has eyes for Daisy Duke, but his feelings are merely of a selfish, lustful nature; Daisy despises Hughie, and thus the only reason that she will ever appear to return Hughie's interest is merely to charm him into relaxing his guard or lure him away from a certain area until the other townspeople can prepare to act against him, thus preventing him from subjecting Hazzard County to additional corruption.
Wayne / Norris	Roger Torrey
One of Hughie's loyal duo of henchmen. Played by the same actor, but with different names on different occasions.
Floyd / Barclay	Pat Studstill
The other of Hughie's duo of henchmen. He and Norris were both bigger than Bo and Luke, but nonetheless struggled in fights against them. Again played by the same actor, but with different names on different occasions.
Emery Potter	Charlie Dell
Emery Potter is the part-time Hazzard County registrar and chief bank teller of the Hazzard Bank. Emery is a meek, soft-spoken man with a low tolerance for anything exciting. He is a friend of the Dukes and sometimes falls under Hogg's crooked schemes simply because he is too timid to stand up for himself. First seen in the second-season episode "People's Choice", the character made several return appearances across the seasons. He has also served as Temporary Deputy on occasion.
Dr. Henry "Doc" Petticord	Patrick Cranshaw
Hazzard County's ancient, long-serving physician.
Miz (Emma) Tisdale	Nedra Volz
The postmistress of the Hazzard Post Office, Miz Tisdale ("Emma" to Jesse Duke) was an elderly woman who drove a motorcycle and had a huge crush on Uncle Jesse because they knew each other long ago. She was also a reporter for the Hazzard Gazette.
Sheriff Edward Thomas "Big Ed" Little	Don Pedro Colley
The hulking sheriff of neighboring Chickasaw County, who drove a 1975 Plymouth Fury patrol car, and the only recurring character in the series played by a black actor. Sheriff Little had an angry tendency to punch and kick fenders and doors off cars that he wrecked. He was also not afraid to pull out his trusty 12-gauge shotgun and open fire. Little is a left-handed sheriff. The ill-tempered sheriff hated Bo, Luke, Daisy, Coy, Vance, Uncle Jesse, Jeb Stewart, and Cooter immensely and they were well aware that Bo and Luke were not allowed to enter his county. Sheriff Little was constantly irritated by the bumbling performance of Sheriff Coltrane and the crookedness of Hogg, although he thought highly of deputy Enos. Little was strict, by-the-book, and a competent law officer, everything that Sheriff Rosco was not. Although Little too had little luck in capturing Bo and Luke. He had a wife named Rachel and a daughter. Before Sheriff Little was introduced in the third-season episode "My Son, Bo Hogg", several first- and second-season episodes saw several similar tough-as-nails Sheriffs from adjoining counties.
Mr. Rhuebottom	John Wheeler
A local owner of Rhuebottom's general store, seen occasionally from the fourth-season episode "Pin the Tail on the Dukes" onwards. The shopfront of Rhuebottom's General Store is seen as early as the first-season episode "Luke's Love Story".
Dr. "Doc" Appleby	Elmore Vincent, later Parley Baer
An elderly physician and successor to Doc Petticord. He is played by Elmore Vincent on the character's first appearance in the fourth-season episode "Dear Diary", before Parley Baer took over the role in subsequent appearances.
Elton Loggins	Ritchie Montgomery
A disc jockey on the local WHOGG radio station, seen in the sixth-season episode "Enos's Last Chance" and the late seventh-season episode "Strange Visitor To Hazzard", and referred to, along with the radio station, in several other episodes. Other than actor M. C. Gainey (who played Sheriff Rosco in the 2005 movie version and had previously played a villain in the fourth-season episode "Bad Day in Hazzard"), Ritchie Montgomery is the only actor to appear in both episode(s) of the TV series and the 2005 movie (where he plays the small role of a State Trooper). Montgomery mentions this in a feature on the DVD versions of the movie.

=== Notable guest appearances ===
Throughout its network television run, The Dukes of Hazzard had a consistent mix of up-and-comers and established stars make guest appearances with some of them having more than one role.

- Robert Alda as C.J. Holmes in "The Runaway"
- Carlos Brown/Alan Autry as
  - Hurley in "Dr. Jekyll and Mr. Duke" under his real name
  - Dawson in "10 Million Dollar Sheriff" Pt. 1 and Pt. 2 under the alias of "Carlos Brown"
- Anthony De Longis as:
  - Norton in "The Hazzardgate Tape"
  - Slade in "Enos and Daisy's Wedding"
- James Avery as Charlie in "Cool Hands, Luke & Bo"
- Norman Alden as Chief Lacey in "Deputy Dukes"
- Rayford Barnes as Ken Collins, a U.S. Marshall who appears in "New Deputy in Town".
- Clancy Brown as Kelly in "Too Many Roscoes"
- Pat Buttram as Sam in "Days of Shine and Roses"
- Dennis Burkley as Mickey Larson in "Strange Visitor to Hazzard"
- Regis Cordic as Reynolds in "10 Million Dillar Sheriff" Pt. 1 and 2
- Ji-Tu Cumbuka as Bubba Malone in "Opening Night at the Boar's Nest"
- Charles Cyphers as:
  - Bumper in "Limo One Is Missing"
  - Phil in "Dead and Alive"
- Ben Davidson as Patch in "Jude Emery"
- Elinor Donahue as Marjorie Dane in "The Sound of Music - Hazzard Style"
- Jason Evers as Larson in "The Haunting of J.D. Hogg"
- Jonathan Frakes as Jamie Lee Hog, the nephew of Boss Hogg who appears in "Mrs. Daisy Hogg".
- Janie Fricke as Ginny in "Happy Birthday, General Lee"
- Michael Fairman as the Deputy Attorney General in "Enos and Daisy's Wedding"
- Donna Fargo as herself in "Double Dukes"
- David Gale as Collins in "Cooter's Girl"
- M. C. Gainey as Peters in "Bad Day in Hazzard"
- Joy Garrett as Big Billie Tucker in "Hazzard Hustle"
- Henry Gibson as Squirt in "Find Loretta Lynn"
- Burton Gilliam as:
  - Tom Colt in "Double Sting"
  - Heep in "The Sound of Music - Hazzard Style"
- David Graf as Maury in "The Canterbury Crock"
- Kevin Peter Hall as Floyd Malone in "Opening Night at the Boar's Nest"
- Linda Hart as Lisa in "Diamonds in the Rough"
- Dennis Haskins as:
  - Moss in "One Armred Bandits"
  - A customer in "The Late J.D. Hogg"
  - Elmo in "Cale Yarborough Comes to Hazzard"
- Bob Hastings as:
  - Barnes in "Witness for the Persecution"
  - Slick in "Coltrane vs. Duke"
  - Taylor in "Sky Bandits Over Hazzard"
- Ernie Hudson as Avery in "Dear Diary"
- Brion James:
  - Jenkins in "Big Daddy"
  - Captain Slater in "Cool Hands, Luke & Bo"
- Waylon Jennings as himself in "Welcome, Waylon Jennings" - See above.
- Arte Johnson as Irving in "Double Sting"
- L. Q. Jones as:
  - Warren in "Witness for the Persecution"
  - Morton in "The Sound of Music - Hazzard Style"
- Roz Kelly as Amy Creavy in "Luke's Love Story"
- Stepfanie Kramer as Anna Louise in "Undercover Dukes" Pt. 1 and 2
- Lance LeGault as Les Sloane in "The Runaway"
- Britt Leach as Buck Simmons in "Strange Visitor to Hazzard"
- Jon Locke as Murkin in "Share and Share Alike"
- Loretta Lynn as herself in "Find Loretta Lynn"
- Frank Marth as Agent Caldwell in "Diamonds in the Rough"
- Robin Mattson as Diane Benson in "Carnival of Thrills"
- John Matuszak as Stoney in "No More Mr. Nice Guy"
- Donald May as Petey in "Welcome Back, Bo 'n' Luke"
- Gerald McRaney as the First Workman in "Hazzard Condition"
- Richard Moll as Milo Beaudry in "Daisy's Shotgun" and "Behind Bars"
- Chris Mulkey as:
  - Billy Rae in "Lulu's Gone Away"
  - Sharp in "The Haunting of J.D. Hogg"
- Charles Napier as:
  - Digger in "Bye, Bye, Boss"
  - Pete in "Targets: Daisy and Lulu"
- Tim O'Connor as Mr. Thackery in "Bad Day in Hazzard"
- Roy Orbison as himself in "The Great Hazzard Hijack"
- Johnny Paycheck as himself in "The Fugitive"
- Hari Rhodes as Ben Jordan in "The Sound of Music - Hazzard Style"
- Kim Richards as Nancylou Nelson in "Cooter's Girl"
- Roger Robinson as Landy in "Mrs. Daisy Hogg"
- Dick Sargent as Sheriff Grady Byrd in "Officer Daisy Duke" and "Jude Emery"
- Ronnie Schell as Lester Starr in "Daisy's Song"
- Avery Schreiber as Wendel in "Double Sting"
- Judson Scott as:
  - Parker in "Witness: Jesse Duke"
  - Lee Benson in "Sittin' Dukes"
- William Smith as Jesse Steele in "10 Million Dollar Sheriff" Pt. 1 and 2
- Don Stroud as Carl in "Carnival of Thrills"
- Mel Tillis as Burt Tolliver in "The Rustlers"
- Mary Treen as Aunt Clara Coltrane in "Sadie Hogg Day"
- Les Tremayne as Big Daddy in "Big Daddy"
- Lurene Tuttle as Granny Annie in "Granny Annie"
- Lewis Van Bergen as Eddie in "Lulu's Gone Away"
- Dottie West as herself in "By-Line, Daisy Duke"
- Joseph Whipp as:
  - Mason in "Diamonds in the Rough"
  - Eddie Hollis in "The Ransom of Hazzard Country"
- Hal Williams as Jonas Jones in "Cooter's Confession"
- Steven Williams as:
  - Leeman in "Dukes in Danger"
  - Percy in "High Flyin' Dukes"
- Terry Wilson as Norman Scroggs in "10 Million Dollar Sheriff" Pt. 1 (Note: "10 Million Dollar Sheriff" was Wilson's final TV role.)
- Morgan Woodward as:
  - Dempsey in "Mason Dixon's Girls"
  - Cassius Claibourne in "Cool Hand's Luke & Bo"
- Tammy Wynette as herself in "The Hazzardville Horror"
- Cale Yarborough as himself in "Dukes Meet Cale Yarborough" and "Cale Yarborough Comes to Hazzard"

==== Others ====
NASCAR driver Terry Labonte makes a brief, uncredited appearance as a crewman in the episode "Undercover Dukes Part 1". The race cars supplied for both "Part 1" and "Part 2" of "Undercover Dukes" were supplied by Labonte's racing team owner, Billy Hagan. However, the emblems of the sponsors of the cars (at that time Labonte was sponsored by Budweiser) were covered to avoid paying royalties.

==== The celebrity speed trap ====
During the show's second season, the show's writers began incorporating a "celebrity speed trap" into some of the episodes, as a means to feature top country stars of the day performing their hits. On its first couple of instances, the "speed trap" was featured early in the story, but for most of the cases, it was featured in the last few minutes of an episode, often used when the main story was running too short to fill episode time.

The "celebrity speed trap" feature was essentially the same each time: Aware that a big-name country star was passing through the area, Boss Hogg would order Rosco to lower the speed limit on a particular road to an unreasonable level (using a reversible sign, with one speed limit on one side and another, far lower, on the back), so that the targeted singer would be in violation of the posted limit. The singer would be required to give a free performance at the Boar's Nest in exchange for having their citations forgiven; the performer would then perform one of their best-known hits or other popular country music standard, while the Dukes, Boss, Rosco, Enos, Cletus, Cooter, and other patrons whooped and hollered in enjoyment of the performance. More often than not, the performer would give a sarcastic parting shot to Boss and Rosco.

Singers who were featured in the "speed trap" segments were:

- Hoyt Axton
- Donna Fargo - See above
- Freddy Fender
- Waylon Jennings (the show's narrator) - See above
- Doug Kershaw (on the original soundtrack)
- The Oak Ridge Boys (twice)
- Roy Orbison - See above
- Buck Owens
- Johnny Paycheck (lip-syncing an original recording) - See above
- Mel Tillis - See above
- Dottie West - See above
- Tammy Wynette - See above

Honorable mentions: Mickey Gilley, Loretta Lynn

Gilley's and Lynn's appearances were not solely for the celebrity speed trap. After performing a concert in Hazzard, Gilley was nabbed while leaving and forced to do a second show to nullify his citation. Loretta Lynn was kidnapped by criminals wanting to break into the music business. Lynn was the very first country music guest star on the show in 1979 and had an entire episode dedicated to her titled "Find Loretta Lynn".

Janie Fricke was the only country music guest star who did not perform a song, celebrity speed trap or otherwise. She played an accomplice to a robber who hid money in the dashboard of the car that was to become the General Lee.

== Casting of Coy and Vance ==
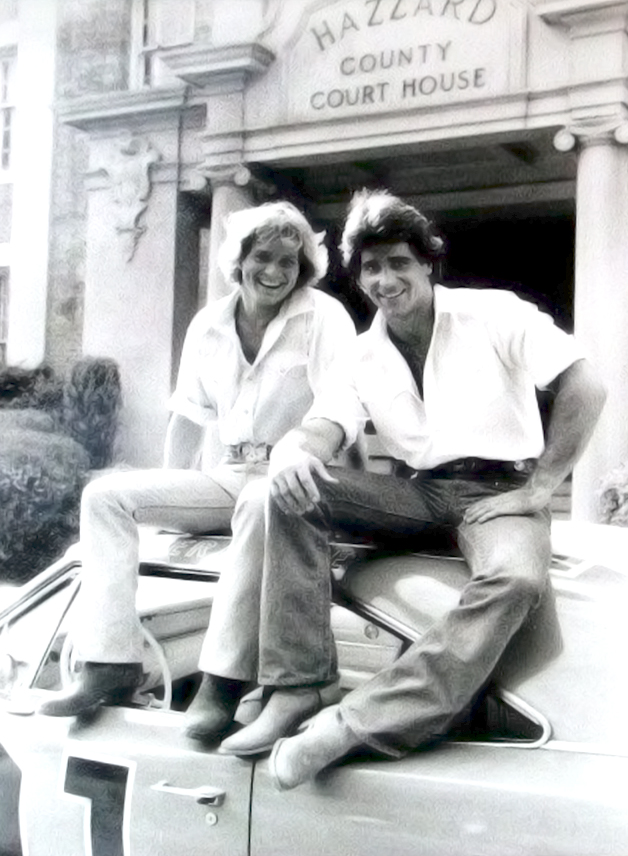
Byron Cherry and Christopher Mayer as Coy and Vance Duke, 1982

The Dukes of Hazzard was consistently among the top-rated television series (at one point, ranking second only to Dallas, which immediately followed the show on CBS' Friday night schedule). With that success came huge profits in merchandising, with a wide array of Dukes of Hazzard toys and products being licensed and becoming big sellers. However, over the course of the show's fourth season, series stars Tom Wopat and John Schneider—who had already previously voiced their concern and discontent about increasingly inferior scripts being written for episodes—became increasingly concerned about a contract dispute over their salaries and merchandising royalties owed to them from the high sales of Dukes products. They felt that neither of them was being paid what was owed to them and this became very frustrating to the duo. As a result, in the spring of 1982, as filming was due to begin on the fifth season, Wopat and Schneider did not report to the set in protest over the matter. Catherine Bach also considered walking out due to similar concerns, but Wopat and Schneider convinced her to stay, insisting that if she left, there might not be a show to come back to, and that settling the issue was up to them.

Production was pushed back by a few weeks as fairly similar looking replacements were hastily hired: Byron Cherry as Coy Duke and Christopher Mayer as Vance Duke. Bo and Luke were said to have gone to race on the NASCAR circuit; how they did this considering the terms of their probation was never explained. Cherry and Mayer were originally contracted at just 10 episodes as stand-ins, still with hope that a settlement might be reached with Wopat and Schneider (in total, they made 19 episodes including one with Bo and Luke). Some scripts for Coy and Vance were originally written for Bo and Luke but with their names crossed out and Coy and Vance penned in.

The new Dukes—previously unmentioned nephews of Uncle Jesse, who were said to have left the farm in 1976 before the show had started—were unpopular with the great majority of viewers, and the ratings immediately sank. Much of the criticism was that Coy and Vance were nothing but direct clones of Bo and Luke, with Coy a direct "carbon copy" replacement for Bo and Vance for Luke, with little variation in character. This was something that even show creator Gy Waldron has said was wrong, and that he insisted, unsuccessfully, that audiences would not accept direct clones and the two replacements should be taken in a different direction character wise, but was overruled by the producers. Waldron also commented that if Bach too had walked, the show would probably have been canceled. It was reported that prior to filming, Cherry and Mayer were given Bo and Luke episodes to watch, to study and learn to emulate them, although Cherry has said in interviews that he does not recall this ever happening.

Hit hard by the significant drop in ratings, Warner Bros. renegotiated with Wopat and Schneider, and eventually a settlement was reached, and the original Duke boys returned to the series in early 1983, four episodes from the conclusion of the fifth season. Initially, part of the press release announcing Wopat and Schneider's return suggested that Cherry and Mayer would remain as part of the cast (though presumably in a reduced role), but it was quickly realized that "four Duke boys" would not work within the context of the series, and due to the huge unpopularity associated with their time on the show, they were quickly written out of the same episode in which Bo and Luke returned.

=== Return of Bo and Luke ===
Although Coy and Vance were never popular, viewers were disappointed by their departure episode, "Welcome Back, Bo 'n' Luke", which was for the most part a standard episode, with the return of Bo and Luke and the departure of Coy and Vance tacked onto the beginning. (Bo and Luke return from their NASCAR tour just as Coy and Vance leave Hazzard to tend to a sick relative.) More than a few viewers commented that they were disappointed by this, and that they would have liked to see both pairs of Duke boys team up to tackle a particularly dastardly plot by Boss Hogg before Coy and Vance's departure; but as it turned out, Coy and Vance had little dialogue and were gone by the first commercial break, never to be seen, heard from or even mentioned again.

While the return of Bo and Luke was welcomed by ardent and casual viewers alike, and as a result ratings recovered slightly, the show never completely regained its former popularity. One of Wopat and Schneider's disputes even before they left was what they considered to be increasingly weak and formulaic scripts and episode plots. With Wopat and Schneider's return, the producers agreed to try a wider scope of storylines. It continued for two more seasons. Many cast members, including Wopat, decried the miniature car effects newly incorporated to depict increasingly absurd General Lee and patrol-car stunts (which had previously been performed by stunt drivers in real cars). The miniature car effects were intended as a budget-saving measure (to save the cost of repairing or replacing damaged vehicles) and to help compete visually with KITT from the NBC series Knight Rider. By February 1985, The Dukes of Hazzard ended its run after seven seasons.

== Vehicles ==
The show is estimated to have gone through 250–355 cars during filming.

=== The General Lee (Dodge Charger) ===
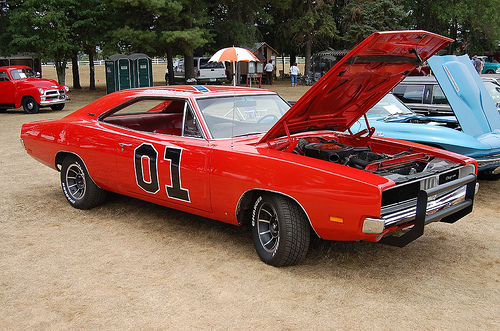
The General Lee (Dodge Charger)

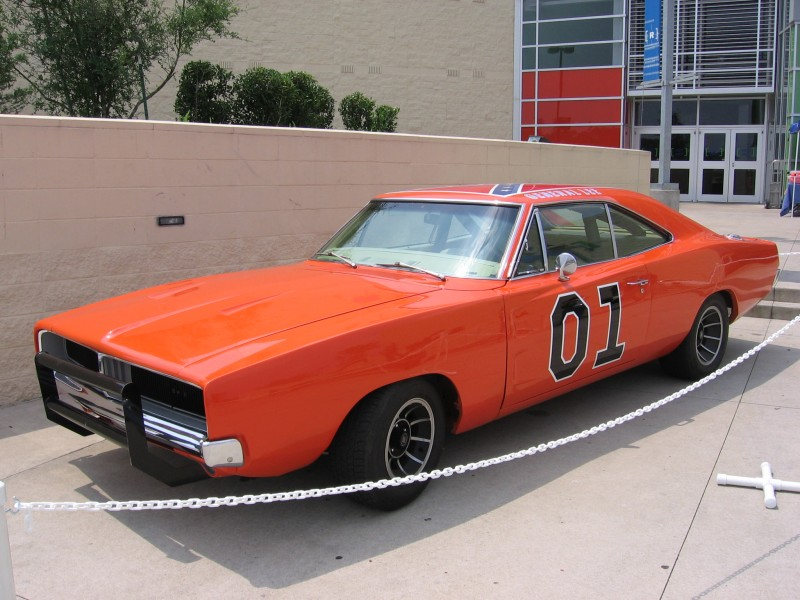
The General Lee on public display

The General Lee was based on a 1969 Dodge Charger owned by Bo and Luke. It was orange with a Confederate battle flag painted on the roof, the words "GENERAL LEE" over each door, and the number "01" on each door. In the original five Georgia-filmed episodes, a Confederate flag along with a checkered racing flag in a criss-cross pattern could be seen behind the rear window; this was removed because the extra decal was impossible to replicate over and over again. The name refers to the American Civil War Confederate General Robert E. Lee. The television show was based on the movie Moonrunners, in turn based on actual moonshine runners who used a 1958 Chrysler named Traveler, after General Lee's horse (with a slight spelling change). Traveler was originally intended to be the name of the Duke boys' stock car too, until producers agreed that General Lee had more punch to it.

Since it was built as a race car, the doors were welded shut. Through the history of the show, an estimated 309 Chargers were used; 17 are still known to exist in various states of repair. A replica was owned by John Schneider, known as "Bo's General Lee". In 2008, Schneider sold "Bo's General Lee" at the Barrett-Jackson automobile auction for $230,000. An eBay auction which garnered a bid of $9,900,500 for the car was never finalized, with the purported bidder claiming his account had been hacked. The underside of the hood has the signatures of the cast from the 1997 TV movie. Schneider has also restored over 20 other General Lee s to date. In 2008, a replica of the General Lee fetched a high bid of $450,000 at the Barrett-Jackson auto auction.

In 2012, the General Lee 1, the first car used in filming the series, was purchased at auction by golfer Bubba Watson for $110,000. The car had been scrapped after being wrecked during the famous opening jump shoot, and was later discovered in a junkyard by the president of the North American General Lee fan club. In 2015, following a wave of sentiment against Confederate symbolism in the wake of shootings in Charleston, South Carolina (relating to photos where the attacker had posed with the Confederate flag), Bubba Watson announced that he would remove the Confederate flag from the roof of the General Lee 1 and repaint it with the U.S. national flag.

The show also used 1968 Chargers (which shared the same sheet metal) by pop-riveting the "I" piece to the center of the 68's grille, as well as cutting out the tail lights, pop-riveting the '69 lenses in place, and removing the round side marker lights. These Chargers performed many record-breaking jumps throughout the show, almost all of them resulting in a completely destroyed car. No 1970 Chargers were used, as backdating them proved to be too time-consuming.

The Duke boys added a custom air horn to the General Lee that played the first 12 notes of the song "Dixie". The Dixie horn was not originally planned, until a Georgia local hot rod racer drove by and sounded his car's Dixie horn. The producers immediately rushed after him asking where he had bought the horn. Warner Bros. purchased several Chargers for stunts, as they generally destroyed at least one or two cars per episode. By the end of the show's sixth season, the Chargers were becoming harder to find and more expensive. In addition, the television series Knight Rider began to rival the General Lee's stunts. As such, the producers used 1:8 scale miniatures, filmed by Jack Sessums' crew, or recycled stock jump footage—the latter being a practice that had been in place to an extent since the second season, and had increased as the seasons passed.

Some of the 01 and Confederate flag motifs were initially hand painted, but as production sped up, these were replaced with vinyl decals for quick application (and removal), as needed.

During the first five episodes of the show that were filmed in Georgia, the cars involved with filming were given to the crew at the H&H body shop near the filming location. At this shop, the men worked day and night to prepare the wrecked cars for the next day while still running their body shop during the day. Time was of the essence, and the men that worked at this shop worked hard hours to get the cars prepared for the show.

The third episode, "Mary Kaye's Baby", is the only one in which the General Lee does not appear. Instead, the Dukes drove around in a blue 1975 Plymouth Fury borrowed from Cooter that Luke later destroyed by shooting a flaming arrow at the car, whose trunk had been leaking due to the moonshine stowed in the back.

The Duke boys' CB handle was (jointly) "Lost Sheep". Originally when the show was conceived, their handle was to be "General Lee" to match their vehicle, but this was only ever used on-screen on one occasion, in the second episode, "Daisy's Song", when Cooter calls Bo and Luke over the CB by this handle, although they were actually driving Daisy's Plymouth Road Runner (see below) at the time. As it became obvious that the "General Lee" handle would be out of place when the Duke boys were in another vehicle, the "Lost Sheep" handle was devised (with Uncle Jesse being "Shepherd" and Daisy being "Bo Peep").

=== Hazzard police cars (AMC Matador, Dodge Polara, Dodge Monaco, Plymouth Fury) ===
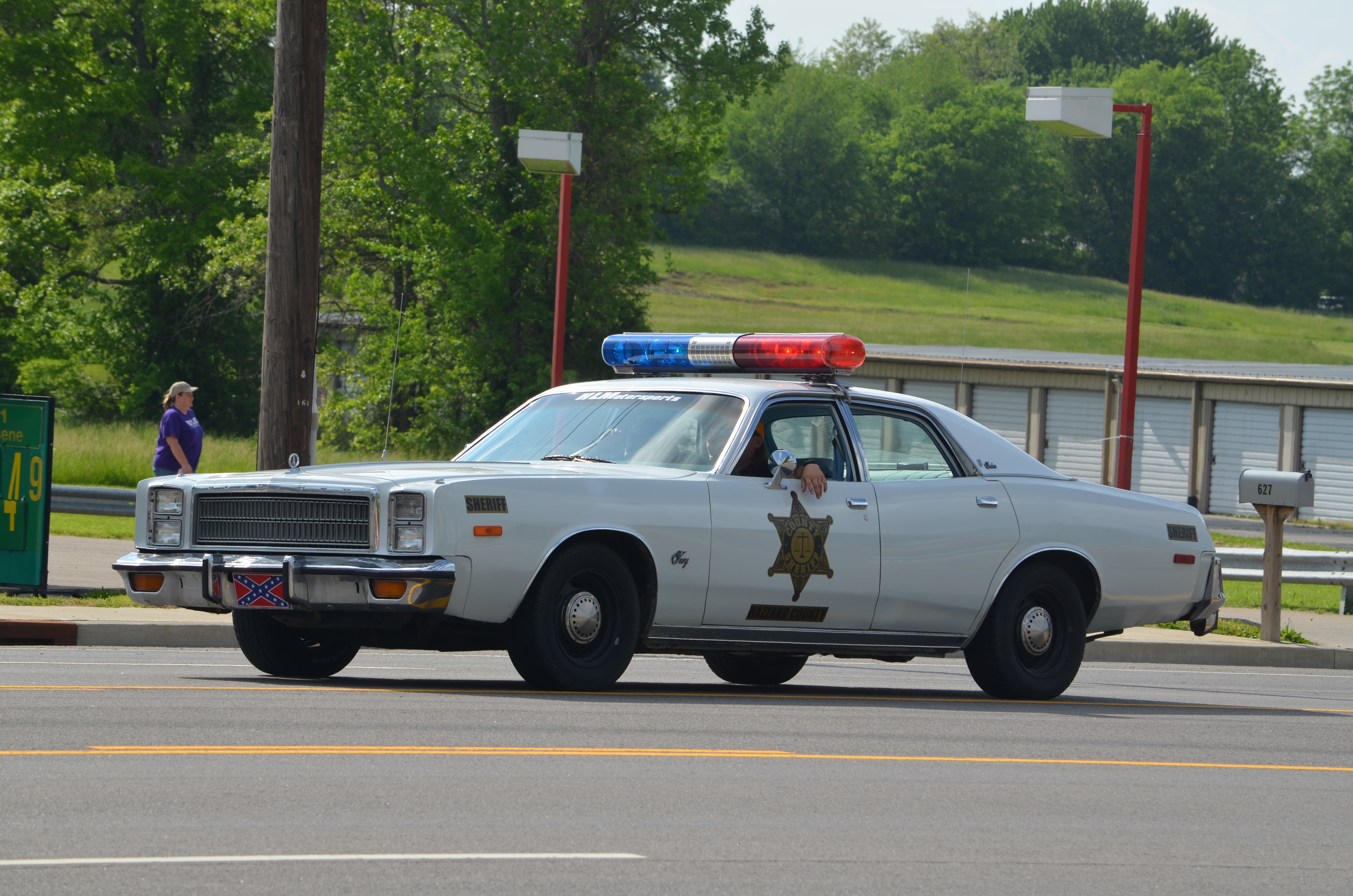
1970s-era Plymouth Fury similar to the ones used in the series

The 1975 AMC Matador was one of many Hazzard County police cars used on the series, mostly in the first season; they had light bars and working radios. A 1970 Dodge Polara and a 1974 Dodge Monaco were used during the pilot episode "One Armed Bandits"; these were also seen in the show's title sequence. From the second season, the 1977 Dodge Monaco was mostly used. From mid-season four the similar looking 1978 Plymouth Fury was used instead. The Matadors and Furies were former Los Angeles Police Department vehicles, while the Monacos were former California Highway Patrol units.

=== Plymouth Road Runner ===
A 1974 Plymouth Road Runner (yellow with a black stripe) was Daisy Duke's car in the first five episodes of the first season. For the last episodes of the first season a similarly painted 1971 Plymouth Satellite Sebring with a matching "Road Runner" stripe was used. In the second season Bo and Luke send it off a cliff in "The Runaway". Another identical Plymouth 1971 model car appeared in a few more episodes after "The Runaway" due to the episodes being aired out of production order.

=== Jeep CJ-7 ===
Dixie was the name given to Daisy Duke's white 1980 Jeep CJ-7 "Golden Eagle" which had a golden eagle emblem on the hood and the name "Dixie" on the sides. Like other vehicles in the show, there was more than one Jeep used throughout the series, which were both manual and automatic transmission. The design of the roll cage also varied across the seasons. When the Jeep was introduced at the end of the second season's "The Runaway", it was seen to have doors and a slightly different paint job, but, bar one appearance in the next produced episode, "Arrest Jesse Duke" (actually broadcast before "The Runaway", causing a continuity error), thereafter the doors were removed and the paint job was made all-white, with Dixie painted on the sides of the hood. These Jeeps were leased to the producers of the show by American Motors Corporation in exchange for a brief mention in the closing credits of the show.

=== Ford F-100 pickup truck ===
Uncle Jesse's truck was a white Ford pickup truck, most commonly a sixth-generation (1973–1977) F100 Styleside. However, in the earliest episodes it had a Flareside bed, and varied between F100 and F250 models throughout the show's run. Bo, Luke and Daisy also drove Jesse's truck on occasion.

=== Cadillac de Ville ===
A white 1970 Cadillac de Ville convertible was used as Boss Hogg's car, notably with large bull horns as a hood ornament. In early seasons, Hogg was almost always driven by a chauffeur, who was normally nameless and had little or no dialogue, but identified on occasion as Alex; and played by several uncredited actors, including stuntman Gary Baxley. This chauffeur was often dressed in a red plaid shirt and deep brown or black Stetson hat but was on occasion an older man, sometimes dressed in more typical chauffeur attire.

Hogg is first seen to drive for himself in the second-season opener "Days of Shine and Roses", where he and Jesse challenge each other to one last moonshine race. From the fourth season onward, except for a couple of brief reappearances of the chauffeur (during the fourth season), Hogg drove himself around in his Cadillac (or occasionally driven by Rosco and, in the series' finale, by Uncle Jesse) and frequently challenged others by invoking his driving expertise from his days as a ridge-runner. Unlike other vehicles in the series, Boss Hogg's Cadillac is typically treated with kid gloves. The car is almost always seen with its convertible top down, with the top only being seen in two episodes, "Daisy's Song" (the chauffeur was called "Eddie" in this episode), the second to be produced and broadcast, and briefly in the second-season episode "Witness for the Persecution", when Cooter is returning it to the Court House after repairs. When filming close-up shots inside the studio, a similar-looking 1967 De Ville is used. The door vent windows were eliminated for 1969, and the small, round, chrome exterior mirror is noticeably different from the 1970 model's large, square, brushed stainless mirror.

=== Ford Custom 500 ===
A green and blacked out 1971 Ford Custom 500 sedan named Black Tillie was once used by Uncle Jesse to make moonshine runs. It makes its only physical appearance in "High Octane" (season 1 episode 5). A 1967 Ford Mustang coupe, known as Black Tillie II, was used in "Days of Shine and Roses" (season 2 episode 1). It was used for a race between Jesse Duke and Boss Hogg to settle their argument over who was the better moonshiner, where because of the agreement with the federal government they carried 10 gallons of water to replace the moonshine.

== Theme song ==
The theme song "Good Ol' Boys" was written and performed by Waylon Jennings. He was also "The Balladeer" (as credited), and served as narrator of the show. The version released as a single is not the same version used in the show's opening credits; the single version has a repeat of the chorus and an instrumental to pad out the length, uses a different instrumental mix that emphasizes the bass, and replaces the last verse with an inside joke about how the TV show producers "keep on showing [Jennings's] hands and not [his] face on TV".

In 1980, the song reached No. 1 on the American Country chart and peaked at No. 21 on the Billboard Hot 100.

== Broadcast history ==
=== United States ===
- The series was originally broadcast in America by CBS on Friday nights, at 9:00 p.m. and later 8:00 p.m., preceding Dallas from January 26, 1979, to February 8, 1985. The darker tone of Dallas made it a good complement to Duke of Hazzard, and the two shows were successful as a double feature.
- Until TNN (The Nashville Network) was purchased by Viacom, it aired reruns of The Dukes of Hazzard. Some months after the creation of "The National Network" (shortly before its change to "Spike TV"), the program was absent from much of television for quite some time. Viacom's country music-themed cable network CMT (the former sister network to TNN) aired the show from 2005 to 2007 at 8:00 p.m. and 9:00 p.m. Eastern Time every weekday. CMT began airing the series in late February 2005. It also aired Monday–Thursday on ABC Family.
- CMT aired The Dukes Ride Again, a special marathon which featured episodes from the first two seasons, on the weekend of September 10, 2010, and have begun airing episodes weeknights at 7 p.m. and 11 p.m. Eastern Time starting September 13, 2010.
- CMT began to re-air The Dukes of Hazzard reruns in high definition, on January 5, 2014.
- TV Land began to air The Dukes of Hazzard reruns on June 10, 2015, but removed them just three weeks later as a response to the Charleston church shooting and the ensuing debate over the modern display of the Confederate flag.

==== Syndication and cable ====
Soon before the series ended its original run on CBS, The Dukes of Hazzard went into off-network syndication. Although not as widely run as it was back in the 1980s and the years since, reruns of the program do continue to air in various parts of the United States.

Notably, television stations that aired the show in syndication include KCOP Los Angeles, WGN-TV Chicago, KBHK-TV San Francisco, WKBD Detroit, WTAF/WTXF Philadelphia, KTXL Sacramento, WVTV Milwaukee, KMSP Minneapolis–Saint Paul, among others.

The Nashville Network bought The Dukes of Hazzard from Warner Bros. in 1997 for well over $10 million; not only did it improve the network's ratings, the show was also popular among younger viewers, a demographic TNN had a notorious difficulty in drawing.

Nationwide, the show also aired on ABC Family (2000–01, 2004), TNN's sister network CMT (2005–07, 2010–12, 2014–15) and TV Land (2015); TV Land dropped the show in the wake of protests and controversy surrounding the display of the Confederate flag.

==== Nielsen ratings ====
Year	Viewers (millions)	Rating
1978–1979	21.0	#20
1979–1980	18.38	#9
1980–1981	21.81	#2
1981–1982	18.41	#6
1982–1983	17.2	#34
1983–1984	16.4	#36
1984–1985	13.8	#41

=== International ===
- In the United Kingdom, the series aired on BBC One, debuting on Saturday March 3, 1979 at 9:00 p.m. (just several months after it began in the U.S.). Popular with all ages (and as some of the more adult elements of very early episodes faded out of the series), it quickly moved from its post-watershed position to a more family-friendly Monday evening slot at 7:20 p.m. Soon a massive hit, it moved from Monday evenings to prime-time Saturday evening (times varied, but typically around 5:25 p.m.), where it stayed for a number of years. Later when ratings began to dip (partly caused by the change to Coy and Vance, and partly to do with competition from ITV, with new hit shows such as The A-Team), it moved back to Mondays, making the odd return for short runs on Saturdays. Late episodes also popped up occasionally on Sunday afternoons, and the remaining episodes of the final season were broadcast on weekday mornings during school holidays in the late 1980s. In 1992, Sky1 bought a package of the program, owning the rights to the first 60 episodes produced (running up to "The Fugitive"), showing the series on Saturday afternoons at 4 p.m. They later showed the episodes they owned again, including a stint showing it in a weekday 3 p.m. slot, running for 50 minutes (including commercials) with the episodes heavily edited for time as a result, often leaving gaps in the plot. Despite requests from fans, they did not secure the rights to later episodes. The series was later run on the satellite channels Granada Plus and TNT. U.K. satellite channel Bravo began airing reruns in August 2005. Reruns were shown on Forces TV. In 2026 the series was shown on Legend (TV channel).
- In Brazil, the series was named Os Gatões (The Big Hunks), which limited its popularity among the male audience.
- The series was also shown in the Netherlands by Dutch broadcasting organization AVRO, with Dutch subtitles, rather than being dubbed.
- It was shown on Ten Network in Australia from September 1979 until the end of the series, and repeated throughout the 1980s, 1990s and 2000s. It was quietly rerun on pay TV channel TV1 in the 2000s, but is now shown on Nine Network's subchannel, Go!.
- The series aired weekdays on New Zealand's channel The BOX. Previously it aired on TVNZ for its original run, being repeated on Saturday afternoons in the early 1990s. In May 1984, a doctor and member of the Auckland Health Board called for the programme to be taken off-air for promoting reckless driving; the production of the story for the Network News was featured in the 1985 documentary Network New Zealand.
- The series was popular in Colombia, dubbed into Spanish. Some late-night reruns continue to the present day.
- In Italy, the series started to air in September 1981 on Canale 5, under the title Hazzard, and quickly became popular.

== Spin-offs ==
- A spin-off series called Enos, starring Sonny Shroyer, aired on CBS from November 1980 to May 1981 and lasted a total of 18 episodes before being canceled.
- An animated spin-off series called The Dukes aired in 1983 and was produced by Hanna-Barbera. The first season fell under the Coy and Vance era of the live-action show and thus they were adapted into animated form. By the second season, Bo and Luke had returned, and they replaced Coy and Vance in the cartoon series.

== Feature films ==
Two made-for-TV reunion movies aired on CBS, The Dukes of Hazzard: Reunion! (1997) and The Dukes of Hazzard: Hazzard in Hollywood (2000).

The film The Dukes of Hazzard was released in 2005, and a standalone prequel The Dukes of Hazzard: The Beginning in 2007.

== Video games ==
Several video games based on the series were created:

- The Dukes of Hazzard for ColecoVision (1984) and ZX Spectrum (1985); also planned for the Atari 2600
- The Dukes of Hazzard: Racing for Home (1999)
- The Dukes of Hazzard II: Daisy Dukes It Out (2000)
- The Dukes of Hazzard: Return of the General Lee (2004)

== Home media ==
=== DVD ===
Warner Home Video has released all seven seasons of The Dukes of Hazzard on DVD in Regions 1 and 2. The two TV movies that followed the series were released on DVD in Region 1 on June 10, 2008, and in Region 4 on June 4, 2014. In Region 4, Warner has released only the first six seasons on DVD and the two TV movies. The Complete Series and Two Unrated Feature Films Box Set was released on DVD in Region 1 on November 14, 2017.

Two one-shot DVDs were also released by Warner, the first one containing three episodes from the TV series (one from each one of its first three seasons) and the second one containing the first episode from it and a behind-the-scenes featurette that announced the upcoming premiere of the 2005 film.

DVD Name	Ep #	Release dates			DVD special features
DVD Name	Ep #	Region 1	Region 2	Region 4	DVD special features
The Complete First Season	13	June 1, 2004	August 15, 2005	August 17, 2005	The 20th Anniversary Hazzard County Barbecue; Dukes Driving 101: A High Octane Salute; The Dukes of Hazzard: The Return of General Lee game preview; Audio commentary
The Complete Second Season	23	January 25, 2005	September 26, 2005	August 17, 2005	The Extreme Hazzard; John Schneider and Tom Wopat screen test
The Complete Third Season	23	May 31, 2005	November 21, 2005	March 1, 2006	Bo, Luke and Daisy – Just Good Ol' Friends: The Stars Reminisce; A Special Welcome; Dukes Family Tree; Audio commentary/Dukes Vision (“And In This Corner, Luke Duke”)
The Complete Fourth Season	27	August 2, 2005	February 13, 2006	March 1, 2006	The Dukes Story: Building the Legend; Audio commentary (“Double Dukes”)
Television Favorites	3	September 27, 2005	N/A	N/A	
Pilot TV Episode	1	November 7, 2005	N/A	N/A	
The Complete Fifth Season	22	December 13, 2005	April 10, 2006	August 9, 2006	Hazzard County Stunt Team: Reunited and In Your Face!; Cooter's Place: Keeping the Dream Alive
The Complete Sixth Season	22	May 30, 2006	July 24, 2006	August 9, 2006	Back Where We Started: The Real Hazzard County; General Lee: The Legendary Charger
The Complete Seventh Season	17	December 5, 2006	September 22, 2008	N/A	Remembering the Outlaw: A Tribute to Waylon Jennings; "Good Ol' Boys" music video with Tom Wopat, John Schneider and Catherine Bach; Making of the music video
Two-Movie Collection	2	June 10, 2008	N/A	June 4, 2014	None
The Complete Series and Two Unrated Feature Films Box Set	147	November 14, 2017	N/A	N/A	Special features from individual sets

=== Streaming ===
The TV series was also made available for streaming and download through a variety of services.

== Reception ==
Season 1 garnered a mixed reception from critics. Tom Shales (The Washington Post): "Within five minutes, the program is out of breath from pandering so pantingly to its audience. [...] If this show succeeds, every television critic in America may as well quit." Peter Hartlaub, writing for the San Francisco Chronicle: "Unfortunately, the first Dukes season wasn't the best, with a low budget and characters who found their footing as the series continued (Cooter started out a numbskull type)." Conversely, Danny Graydon (Empire) writes: "Today, Hazzard's considerable charm endures, even if the sheer predictability is wearing."

The series was a popular success. Laurence Marcus of Television Heaven described it as "an instant hit on both sides of the Atlantic", and wrote that its top-ten ratings, together with Dallas which followed it, gave CBS a strong Friday night lineup that helped the network regain the number one position it had lost to ABC in 1976.

Reviewing the later seasons on DVD for DVD Talk, Ian Jane wrote that by the third season "the writers and the performers in the series had come into their own and the humor started to flow a little better". He judged the fifth season weaker, writing that Coy and Vance "weren't Bo and Luke Duke, no matter how close they came", and advised newcomers to start with one of the first two seasons, "arguably the strongest that the series has had". Of the final season, he wrote that it "did manage to squeeze in a few episodes that stand as some of the best that the season had to offer", despite some gimmicks he suggested were probably an attempt to save the series from dwindling ratings.

== Legacy and influence in popular culture ==
=== Alice ===
Sorrell Booke and Sonny Shroyer appeared in 1983 during "Mel is Hogg-Tied", an eighth-season episode of the television series Alice. Booke guest-starred as Boss Hogg, who is a distant cousin of Jolene Hunnicutt, arrives from Hazzard County and tries to swindle Mel into selling his diner to him for $1. Shroyer also guest-starred as Deputy Enos Strate.

=== Hazzard County ===
In 2005, the Humana Festival of New American Plays premiered a full-length comedy drama entitled Hazzard County by Allison Moore. The story centers on a young widowed mother and a visit that she receives from a big city television producer. Interspersed with recollections of Bo, Luke, and Daisy, the play takes a deep look at Southern "good ol' boy" culture and its popularization through the lens of American mass media.

=== Smallville ===
Tom Wopat and John Schneider were reunited in 2005 during "Exposed", a fifth-season episode of the television series Smallville. Wopat guest-starred as Kansas State Senator Jack Jennings, an old friend of Clark Kent's adoptive father Jonathan Kent (portrayed by Schneider). In the episode, Jennings drives a 1968 Dodge Charger—the same body style as the General Lee.

=== Daisy Dukes ===
Daisy Duke was almost always dressed in very short blue jeans shorts. That style of shorts became known as "Daisy Dukes". Katy Perry references "Daisy Dukes" in her number one single “California Gurls”. A 1993 rap song titled "Dazzey Duks" by the Miami-based rap duo Duice and the 69 Boys was also a reference to the shorts Daisy wore in the series.

=== Only Fools and Horses ===
The series is referenced in the British sitcom Only Fools and Horses; it is one of Grandad's favourite television programmes.

=== Lizard Lick Towing ===
Lizard Lick Towing featured an episode with its repossession specialists Ronnie Shirley and Bobby Brantley repossessing a General Lee replica.

=== AutoTrader commercial ===
In 2014, AutoTrader made a commercial where Bo and Luke shop for a new car while being chased.

=== Confederate battle flag ===
After the 2015 Charleston church shooting, renewed debate about the symbolism of the Confederate battle flag (which was prominently featured on the General Lee's roof, and the panel behind the rear window in the first five episodes) prompted TV Land to pull reruns of the original series. Warner Bros., which owns the property, announced it would also no longer create merchandise bearing the flag, including miniatures of the General Lee. During the 2020 George Floyd protests, Amazon reportedly considered removing the program from its streaming service.

=== Cooter's ===
Artifacts from the show are on display in Luray, Virginia; Nashville, Tennessee; and Pigeon Forge, Tennessee. Cooter's Place in Luray is overseen by Ben "Cooter" Jones from the series. The Pigeon Forge location features a gift shop and a small display of costumes, collectibles and artifacts from the show.

Covington and Conyers, Georgia, where the original five episodes were produced and filmed, have been two major tourist attractions for The Dukes of Hazzard fans.

== See also ==
- Action comedy § Television
