= Christopher Mayer (American actor) =

American actor (1954–2011)

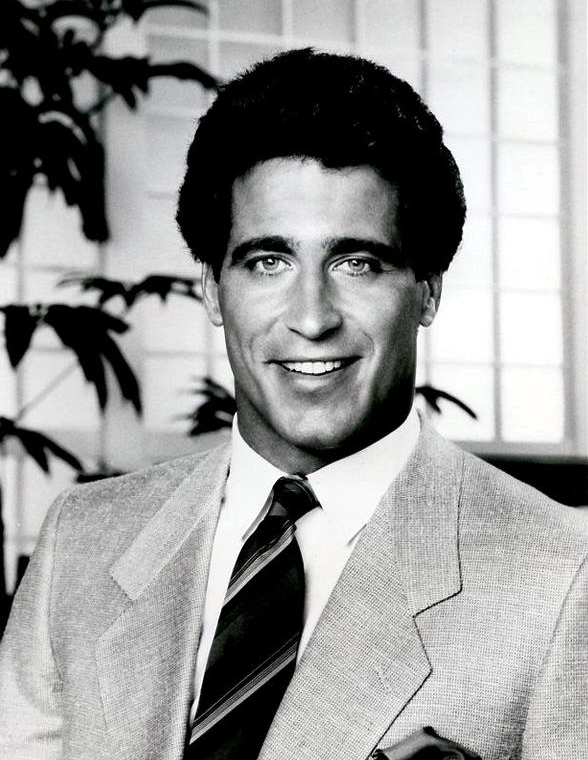
- Mayer in 1984
- Born: George Charles Mayer III; February 21, 1954; New York City, U.S.
- Died: July 23, 2011 (aged 57); Los Angeles, California, U.S.
- Other names: Chris Mayer, Chip Mayer
- Occupation: Actor
- Years active: 1980–2000
- Known for: Vance Duke in The Dukes of Hazzard
- Spouses: Teri Copley (m. 1982; div. 1984) Eileen Davidson (m. 1985; div. 1986) Shauna Sullivan (m. 1988; div. 2006)
- Children: 3

Christopher Mayer (born George Charles Mayer III; February 21, 1954 – July 23, 2011), also known as Chip Mayer, was an American actor.

Mayer was best known for portraying Vance Duke on The Dukes of Hazzard for 19 episodes during season 5 of the show. Cousins Coy and Vance Duke temporarily replaced Bo and Luke Duke as the show's leading characters (due to a salary dispute between producers and the original actors).

== Career ==
Mayer played the role of Vance Duke in 19 episodes of the fifth season of The Dukes of Hazzard during 1982–83. Mayer continued his work in television and movies into the early 1990s, including a stint on the daytime serial Santa Barbara. He also played Kenneth Falk in the film Liar Liar (1997) alongside Jim Carrey. He appeared on Star Trek: Deep Space Nine, season 7, episode 15, "Badda Bing Badda Bang" as a security guard in 1999. His last TV credit was a guest appearance on 18 Wheels of Justice in 2000.

== Personal life ==
Mayer's first marriage was to actress Teri Copley, with whom he had a daughter, Ashley. Mayer's second marriage was to Eileen Davidson, an actress on the daytime serials Days of Our Lives and The Young and the Restless. Mayer's third marriage was to actress Shauna Sullivan in 1988, with whom he had two more daughters, Alexandra and Angelica. Mayer was engaged to Catherine Irvine at the time of his death.

Mayer was found dead of natural causes in his Los Angeles home in Sherman Oaks on July 23, 2011.

== Filmography ==
Year	Title	Role	Notes
1980	Stunts Unlimited	Matt Lewis	TV movie
1981	Our Family Business	Jaimie	TV movie
1982–1983	The Dukes of Hazzard	Vance Duke	19 episodes
1983	The Dukes	Vance Duke	13 episodes
1983	The Love Boat	Chester O'Brien	Episode: "Long Time No See/The Bear Essence/Kisses and Makeup"
1984	Simon & Simon	Steven Lacey	Episode: "Dear Lovesick"
1984–1985	Glitter	Pete Bozak	13 episodes
1985	The Love Boat	Gus Braddock	Episode: "Ace Takes the Test/The Counterfeit Couple/The Odd Triple"
1986	The Ted Knight Show	Peter Genopolis	Episode: "Acropolis Now"
1987	Survivor	The Survivor	
1987–1989	Santa Barbara	T.J. Daniels	180 episodes
1991–1992	Silk Stalkings	Tyler	Episodes: "Hardcopy", "Powder Burn"
1993	Official Denial	Sergeant Gilleland	TV movie
1994	Renegade	Matt Dwyer	Episode: "Once Burned, Twice Chey"
1994	Weird Science	"Magnifico"	Episode: "Magnifico Dad"
1994	Silk Stalkings	Paul Jaeger	Episode: "The Mud-Queen Murders"
1995	Platypus Man	Patrick	Episode: "Lou's the Boss"
1995	Pig Sty	Stud	Episode: "May I Borrow a Cup of Death"
1995	East Meets West	Gus Taylor	
1995	Xena: Warrior Princess	Peranis	Episodes: "The Path Not Taken", "The Reckoning"
1996	High Tide	John Chapman / Scorpion	Episode: "Code Name: Scorpion"
1996	Weird Science	"Ripsaw"	Episode: "Lisa's Childhood Memories"
1996	Baywatch Nights	Chad Lindsay	Episode: "A Closer Look"
1996	Raven	Hub	Direct-to-video
1996	Renegade	Dan Snow	Episode: "Father's Day"
1996	Hard Time	Kelly	
1997	Sliders	Man In Bar	Episode: "The Breeder"
1997	Liar Liar	Kenneth Falk	
1998	Baywatch	Vance	Episode: "Countdown"
1998	Pacific Blue	Thomas Leary	Episode: "With This Ring"
1998	Silk Stalkings	Danny Marshall	Episode: "Passion and the Palm Beach Detectives"
1998	The Hunted	Jake McKnight	
1999	Star Trek: Deep Space Nine	Guard	Episode: "Badda-Bing, Badda-Bang"
2000	18 Wheels of Justice	Sergeant Tom Geller	Episode: "The Road to Hell"
