= List of It's a Living episodes =

The American situation comedy It's a Living ran from October 30, 1980, to June 11, 1982, on ABC, and from September 28, 1985, to April 8, 1989, in syndication. A total of 120 episodes were produced over six seasons.

== Series overview ==
Season	Title	Episodes	Originally released		
Season	Title	Episodes	First released	Last released	Network
1	It's a Living	13	October 30, 1980	August 4, 1981	ABC
2	Making a Living	14	October 24, 1981	June 11, 1982	ABC
3	It's a Living	22	September 28, 1985	May 24, 1986	Syndication
4	It's a Living	25	September 27, 1986	May 23, 1987	Syndication
5	It's a Living	26	September 26, 1987	May 28, 1988	Syndication
6	It's a Living	20	October 15, 1988	April 8, 1989	Syndication

== Episodes ==
=== Season 1 (1980–1981) ===
No. overall	No. in season	Title	Directed by	Written by	Original release date	Prod. code
1	1	"Pilot"	John Tracy	Story by : Dick Clair, Jenna McMahon; Teleplay by : Stu Silver	October 30, 1980	001
For the first time in her life, long-time virgin Vicki prepares for her first date.
2	2	"The Intruder"	Joel Zwick	Wally Dalton, Shelley Zellman	November 6, 1980	003
Despite reports of a cat burglar roaming her neighborhood, Lois invites Jan to stay at her home while her husband and children are away on a camping trip for the weekend. But those plans take an even bigger turn when Vicki, Cassie and Dot insist on turning it into a pajama party... of which is, of course, crashed by the cat burglar!
3	3	"Roomies"	Joel Zwick	Sheldon Bull	November 13, 1980	002
When Vicki's plans to have the apartment to herself is delayed by the tenants' desire to stay in the place, the ladies turn to a reluctant Cassie to let Vicki move in with her.
4	4	"Fallen Idol"	Joel Zwick	Sheldon Bull	November 27, 1980	004
Vicki's father pays his daughter a visit and is disappointed at her job and work attire. But Vicki becomes more disappointed when her father ends up sleeping with Nancy.
5	5	"The Lois Affair"	Joel Zwick	Wally Dalton, Shelley Zellman	December 11, 1980	007
After Lois and her husband have a fight, Lois learns that a former flame has shown up in town hoping to rekindle their romance, prompting the ladies to intervene before it is too late.
6	6	"Super-Mom"	Jay Sandrich	Story by : Paula A. Roth; Teleplay by : Sheldon Bull	December 18, 1980	006
Jan takes another job in order to pay for her daughter's ballet lessons. But the conflict with working two jobs prompts Nancy to fire Jan.
7	7	"Cassie's Punctured Romance"	Joel Zwick	Sheldon Bull, Mark Rothman	January 1, 1981	008
In an effort to impress her boyfriend despite her personal feelings about falling in love, Cassie decides to cook him a dinner with help from the ladies.
8	8	"Up on the Roof"	Jay Sandrich	Greg Antonacci	January 8, 1981	005
Things are about to get hot for the waitresses when a fire breaks out at the hotel. Note: This episode was originally scheduled to air on November 27, 1980. ABC postponed it since the scheduled airing came six days after 85 people had died in the MGM Grand fire.
9	9	"Making the Grade"	Joel Zwick	Kimberly Hill	January 15, 1981	010
Jan's decision to date her college professor takes a turn for the worse when he threatens to fail her if she does not sleep with him.
10	10	"Our Man Barry"	Joel Zwick	Sheldon Bull	January 22, 1981	011
Dot and Vicki discover that they fallen for the same guy, while Nancy makes Lois and Cassie lose weight to conform within standards.
11	11	"Kids"	Joel Zwick	Greg Antonacci	July 21, 1981	012
Jan and Lois debate over a pornographic magazine that was found in the bedroom of Lois' son.
12	12	"R-E-S-P-E-C-T"	Joel Zwick	Story by : Stu Silver; Teleplay by : Gloria Banta	July 28, 1981	009
Lois learns that her daughter (Tricia Cast) has told her class in her essay that she works as a bank executive just a day before Lois is invited to speak at her class.
13	13	"You're Not Old, You're Fired"	Joel Zwick	Wally Dalton, Shelley Zellman	August 4, 1981	013
Age discrimination takes center stage when Nancy is suddenly fired. Lois, being the most senior of the waitresses, replaces her and learns that being in charge is not what she had in mind.

=== Season 2 (1981–1982, as Making a Living) ===
No. overall	No. in season	Title	Directed by	Written by	Original release date	Prod. code
14	1	"Boys of Summer"	John Bowab	Sheldon Bull	October 24, 1981	018
The ladies step up to bat when a baseball team visits the restaurant.
15	2	"All My Son"	Jay Sandrich	Story by : Greg Antonacci & Vicki S. Horwits; Teleplay by : Greg Antonacci	October 31, 1981	016
Sonny learns that a woman that he slept with 10 years earlier has shown up to tell him that she has a son... and he might be the father.
16	3	"Of Mace and Men"	John Bowab	Barbara Benedek	November 7, 1981	019
Reports of a mugger attacking women near the hotel takes center stage for the waitresses. But it is Dot who becomes the reluctant hero after she confronts and attacks him seriously with her can of mace, prompting the criminal to sue her for his injuries.
17	4	"The Wedding"	John Bowab	Deborah Leschin & Barbara Benedek	November 14, 1981	022
A wedding event that is about to take place at the restaurant is called off because the groom has professed his love for someone he dated for five years way before he met his fiancee... Cassie!
18	5	"Second Time Around, Almost"	John Bowab	Sheldon Bull	November 21, 1981	021
Jan and her Ex learn that they still have feelings for each other, even though Jan thought it had already died a while back.
19	6	"Off the Top"	John Bowab	Barbara Benedek	December 5, 1981	025
When the restaurant is sold and its owners wanting to turn it into a fitness center, the waitresses prepare to face unemployment, except for Sonny, who just got hired at another restaurant.
20	7	"Mann Is Mann"	John Bowab	Greg Antonacci	December 12, 1981	023
Sonny's brother pays him a visit that gets too brotherly – and goes too far – when the brother's girlfriend makes a move on Sonny. Meanwhile, the waitresses search for a missing winning raffle ticket
21	8	"Jealousy or Mildred Fierce"	John Bowab	Gloria Banta	January 2, 1982	020
The waitresses, and even Nancy, try their best to comfort Dennis after his wife leaves him.
22	9	"Young Love"	Jay Sandrich	Larry Balmagia	January 9, 1982	015
Maggie decides to throw a party to thank everyone for welcoming her to town. But her party is actually a scheme to pair her 23-year-old brother with Dot. Unfortunately, her brother has fallen for an older woman... 33-year-old Jan!
23	10	"The Garden of Countess Natasha"	Greg Antonacci	Gloria Banta & Greg Antonacci	February 12, 1982	027
The waitresses act like Siskel & Ebert after they witness and give their review of Dot's new play.
24	11	"Falling in Love Again"	John Bowab	Sheldon Bull	February 19, 1982	024
For the first time since her husband died, Maggie reconnects with the first man that she ever dated before she met her husband. Meanwhile, cops stakeout Above The Top to capture bandits.
25	12	"Horsing Around"	Jay Sandrich	Greg Antonacci	February 26, 1982	014
Jan and Maggie take up gambling on horses after Jan gets a hot tip from a jockey, prompting the staff to get in on the details. But all bets could be off when Maggie mistakes a menu number the jockey orders as the number of the winner in the next race.
26	13	"Strange Bedfellows"	John Bowab	Deborah Leschin	June 4, 1982	026
Dot is besieged with bad luck, landing in the hospital with a deviated septum, and while at the hospital must deal with a relentless cheery roommate. Meanwhile, the rest of the waitresses must deal with a roomful of World War I veterans.
27	14	"A Farewell to Arm"	John Bowab	Deborah Leschin	June 11, 1982	017
Jan's biggest day in her life, a dream date, is sidetracked by helping Maggie with her garage sale.

=== Season 3 (1985–1986, as It's a Living, in first-run syndication) ===
No. overall	No. in season	Title	Directed by	Written by	Original release date	Prod. code
28	1	"Harassed"	Jay Sandrich	Susan Beavers	September 28, 1985	029
Newcomer Amy Tompkins (Crystal Bernard) must deal with a stalker who keeps sending her threatening messages. Meanwhile Howard refuses to accept a shipment of fish from a supplier he does not approve of, infuriating Nancy, who wants him to take the supplies.
29	2	"Cassie's Cowboy"	Jay Sandrich	Tom Whedon	October 5, 1985	028
Cassie falls for a millionaire cowboy, who wants Cassie to be a cowgirl if she wants to be with him.
30	3	"Amy Big Girl Now"	J.D. Lobue	Sheldon Bull	October 12, 1985	033
Amy's father pays a surprise visit... and to bring her back to Texas with him.
31	4	"Desperate Hours"	J.D. Lobue	Marc Sotkin	October 19, 1985	030
Nancy is excited to receive the arrival of an ambassador of a Third World country. However, the plans goes awry when the restaurant is taken hostage by terrorists from his home country. Meanwhile, Jan helps her daughter Ellen deliver her pet cat's litter of kittens.
32	5	"I Write the Songs"	J.D. Lobue	Sheldon Bull	October 26, 1985	032
Sonny is offered a recording contract and abruptly quits the restaurant hoping that he'll make it big... or so he thinks. Guest star: Stuart Pankin
33	6	"Jan's Engagement"	J.D. Lobue	Marc Sotkin	November 2, 1985	031
Jan falls for a fan repairman (Richard Kline), but the romance accelerates to when he asks Jan to marry him. Meanwhile, Amy, taking advice from Dot, tries to lie to Nancy to get a day off so she can go to a rodeo.
34	7	"From Russia With Love"	J.D. Lobue	Andy Guerdat & Steve Kreinberg	November 9, 1985	034
A Russian decides to defect to the United States after he falls for Cassie and takes refuge in her locker.
35	8	"The Prom Show"	J.D. Lobue	Marc Sotkin	November 16, 1985	035
When the entertainment for a prom fails to show up at the restaurant, Dot takes charge with help from Sonny and Amy. Meanwhile, Jan is not so sure about marrying Richie after learning that he wants to have a child with her.
36	9	"The Wedding Show"	J.D. Lobue	Marc Sotkin	November 23, 1985	036
A wedding day for Jan and Richie is about to hit a snag when the judge is a no-show and the honeymoon brings along a third wheel.
37	10	"Hail to the Chef"	J.D. Lobue	Andy Guerdat & Steve Kreinberg	December 21, 1985	039
The President is expected to come to the restaurant. There's only one problem: Lead chef Howard isn't cleared by Secret Service after they check his background.
38	11	"Eleven Angry Men and Dot"	J.D. Lobue	Andy Guerdat & Steve Kreinberg	December 28, 1985	040
Dot serves jury duty and ends up being the only holdout. Meanwhile the waitresses hold out for Dot's return as they pick up her slack.
39	12	"Gender Gap"	J.D. Lobue	Robin Pennington	January 11, 1986	041
Nancy is forced to hire an obnoxious waiter after the restaurant is hit with a Sex Discrimination lawsuit.
40	13	"Jealous Wife"	J.D. Lobue	Tom Whedon	January 18, 1986	037
Cassie's dreamy one-night stand just became her nightmare when she is humiliated by the wife of the guy she slept with.
41	14	"The Doctor Danny Show"	J.D. Lobue	Marc Sotkin	February 1, 1986	046
After Nancy suffers a hernia during a date, her physician (Danny Thomas) insists that she have an operation immediately. But when she begins to relive her phobia about being in a hospital, she refuses to seek treatment. Meanwhile, Amy convinces the waitresses to invest in a vacation property venture. Guest star: Bob Saget (Gail Edwards who plays Dot on the show would play Vicky Larson, the love interest of Bob Saget's character Danny Tanner for three seasons on Full House.)
42	15	"Jewel Heist"	J.D. Lobue	Tom Whedon	February 15, 1986	038
Terrorists target the restaurant when they learn that a visiting princess will be dining there and will be wearing a necklace that they want badly. Too bad that Dot accidentally takes a drugged napkin that was meant for the princess, leading to a mad scramble by a drugged Dot to stop the crooks from making their getaway.
43	16	"The Jerks"	J.D. Lobue	Marc Sotkin	February 22, 1986	049
While they are forced to stay at the restaurant to take inventory, the waitresses swap their tales of the worst guys that they had ever dated.
44	17	"Oddest Couple"	J.D. Lobue	Andy Guerdat & Steve Kreinberg	February 8, 1986	044
Cassie reluctantly moves in with Sonny while she attempts to find a place. But this pairing also has everyone at work guessing about this arrangement.
45	18	"Dot's Puppy"	J.D. Lobue	Tom Whedon	April 12, 1986	042
Dot replaces her dead cat with a noisy puppy. Meanwhile, Sonny decides to quit his job so he can date a roller derby skater.
46	19	"Dinner with Deedee"	J.D. Lobue	Tom Whedon	May 3, 1986	043
Jan is not looking forward to a visit from an old friend (Jennifer Salt) who has always outclassed her.
47	20	"Jump"	J.D. Lobue	Roger Garrett	May 10, 1986	045
Cassie is stunned as to why a customer constantly refuses to leave her tips, only to learn that he works for the IRS and he has to audit her. Meanwhile, Dot's boyfriend decides to threaten suicide by jumping off the building if she doesn't continue to date him.
48	21	"America's Sweetheart"	J.D. Lobue	Dan O'Shannon	May 17, 1986	047
Dot learns that her cartoonist boyfriend (Jeff Altman) is using her as a model for a new character in his comic strip.
49	22	"Mann Act"	J.D. Lobue	Tom Whedon & Marc Sotkin	May 24, 1986	048
Sonny learns the girl he's dating is a mobster's moll.

=== Season 4 (1986–1987) ===
No. overall	No. in season	Title	Directed by	Written by	Original release date	Prod. code
50	1	"The Roof Show"	J.D. Lobue	Roger Garrett	September 27, 1986	050
The staff find themselves trapped on the roof, while Amy, Nancy and Howard must deal with an unruly crowd at the restaurant. Sheryl Lee Ralph joins the cast as Ginger St. James on the show.
51	2	"The Bar"	J.D. Lobue	Bob Colleary	October 4, 1986	053
The girls decide to cheer up a lonely Amy by taking her to a singles bar. But the ladies are discovering that the place is full of Mr. Wrongs. Jonathan Frakes, Ernie Hudson and Charles Fleischer guest stars as the aforementioned male patrons.
52	3	"The Reunion Show"	J.D. Lobue	Marc Sotkin	October 11, 1986	052
Jan learns that an old boyfriend still carries a torch for her while she attends her high school reunion. Meanwhile, Nancy comes up with a plan to trick Howard into coming home with her.
53	4	"Surprise"	J.D. Lobue	Tom Whedon	October 18, 1986	051
Amy believes that Richie is having an affair with Ginger, and is not so sure whether to tell Jan just days before her birthday party.
54	5	"Nancy's Sister"	J.D. Lobue	Robert Bruce & Marty Weiss	October 25, 1986	057
Nancy is not happy when her sister Gloria shows up, especially when Nancy is convinced that she'll go after Howard.
55	6	"Night at the Iguana"	J.D. Lobue	Tom Whedon	November 1, 1986	054
A Psycho-themed episode, which finds the ladies and Sonny checking into a hotel run by a mysterious man and his unseen mother after their car breaks down en route to Las Vegas.
56	7	"Family Feud"	J.D. Lobue	Bob Perlow & Gene Braunstein	November 8, 1986	058
Dot's divorced mother and Jan's divorced father become an unlikely item while visiting their daughters.
57	8	"The Dot and Howard Show"	J.D. Lobue	Marc Sotkin	November 15, 1986	055
Rumors start flying after Dot and Howard start going to social events together as friends.
58	9	"Farewell, My Sonny"	J.D. Lobue	Tom Whedon	November 22, 1986	059
A murder mystery party just got a lot more murderous for Sonny after he becomes a prime suspect.
59	10	"Critic's Choice"	J.D. Lobue	Roger Garrett	December 6, 1986	060
When Howard receives a visit from a rival, who happens to be a food critic who is doing a review of the restaurant, he find his job and his relationship with Nancy could be in jeopardy in more ways than one.
60	11	"Richie's Sculpture"	J.D. Lobue	Bill Davenport	December 20, 1986	056
Richie allows a new sculpture that he borrowed from someone else be displayed at the restaurant, only to have Jan accidentally sell it to a tourist.
61	12	"Sonny's Oil (aka The Oil Show)"	Gary Brown	Marc Sotkin	January 3, 1987	063
Sonny convinces the ladies to join him on his oil investment venture.
62	13	"Nancy's Birthday Party"	J.D. Lobue	Story by : Michael Lawrence & Gil Junger; Teleplay by : Gil Junger	January 10, 1987	072
Nancy drops hints about her birthday party that she believes the waitresses will be throwing for her. Meanwhile Jan and Richie have a marital fight and Sonny wants to join Dot's carpool.
63	14	"The Evictables"	J.D. Lobue	Tom Whedon	January 17, 1987	061
After Ginger is evicted from her apartment because she is withholding rent money until the landlord repaints the place thanks to Jan's advice, Ginger moves in with Amy at her women's-only apartment complex. But after Ginger's boyfriend walks into the place unannounced, Amy and Ginger are both kicked out, and both now must find a place to stay. Patty Duke makes a cameo as a customer who wasn't impressed with Sonny's critique of her 1963–66 sitcom after he plays the show's theme song.
64	15	"Ginger's Baby"	Gary Brown	Roger Garrett	January 24, 1987	062
Ginger is left holding a baby after she agrees to babysit the child. Meanwhile, Sonny agrees to babysit a friend's car, only to take the wrong one... which belongs to a gangster.
65	16	"Bachelor Party"	Gary Brown	Andy Guerdat & Steve Kreinberg	January 31, 1987	064
Howard is not happy about Sonny dating his niece after she falls for him.
66	17	"Amy's Rusty"	Gary Brown	Bob Perlow & Gene Braunstein	February 7, 1987	065
Amy decides to reunite with an old flame after she feels guilty for not having been married. Meanwhile, Dot starts selling skin care products.
67	18	"Dot's Priest"	Gary Brown	Roger Garrett	February 14, 1987	066
Dot learns that her former boyfriend is about to join the priesthood and questions his commitments.
68	19	"The Dickie Doodle Show"	Gary Brown	Tom Whedon	February 21, 1987	067
A former children's show hosts' fan club dinner conflicts with Nancy's meeting with the restaurant chain's vice president.
69	20	"The Howie Show"	Christine Ballard	Marc Sotkin	February 28, 1987	068
Howard is worshiped by South Pacific natives as a supreme being. Meanwhile, Nancy holds a contest for the waitresses.
70	21	"The Dot Quits Show"	Gary Brown	Marc Sotkin	March 7, 1987	073
Dot quits the restaurant to become a full-time unemployed actress; Sonny decides to write a musical based on Attila the Hun; Ginger's fetish for footwear has a hypnotic effect on Amy.
71	22	"The Two Guys Show"	J.D. Lobue	Marc Sotkin	May 2, 1987	070
Ginger must choose between two guys based on their merits, while Howard must choose between competing restaurant who want to hire him.
72	23	"A Romantic Comedy"	J.D. Lobue	Roger Garrett	May 9, 1987	071
The staff are ruining what supposed to be a romantic evening alone for Jan and Richie.
73	24	"Manhandling"	Paul Kreppel	Tom Whedon	May 16, 1987	069
Ginger feels like she's been taken for a ride after she buys Jan's car, while Amy asks Dot to play matchmaker between her and a new male employee.
74	25	"Nancy's Shrink"	J.D. Lobue	Marc Sotkin & Tom Whedon & Roger Garrett	May 23, 1987	074
A psychiatrist asks Nancy to review her relationships with her staff.

=== Season 5 (1987–1988) ===
No. overall	No. in season	Title	Directed by	Written by	Original release date	Prod. code
75	1	"Till Death Do Us Part"	J.D. Lobue	Tom Whedon	September 26, 1987	076
Sonny is hoping his fiancee will make it to their wedding. Meanwhile, Howard's high school flame visits.
76	2	"Her Back to the Future"	J.D. Lobue	Kenny Wolin and Barry Bleach	October 3, 1987	078
In this Back to the Future-themed episode (that pre-dates the sequel), Nancy dozes off during a wedding reception and dreams that everyone has done well for themselves ten years into the future... only to learn that its Amy who married Howard and she ended up marrying Sonny. Lyle Waggoner guest stars; Sheryl Lee Ralph performs "Shake Me, Wake Me (When It's Over)" and Marian Mercer sings and dances to "Brazil" with members of the Chippendale Men.
77	3	"No, My Darling Daughter"	J.D. Lobue	Tom Whedon	October 10, 1987	075
The waitresses start to worry about letting Jan's daughter Ellen date a senior student, while Howard asks Nancy for $900 to pay back a loan shark.
78	4	"Sweet Charity"	Bob Sweeney	Tom Whedon	October 17, 1987	080
When Dot's production of Little Red Riding Hood is hit with a case of chicken pox that quarantines the children in the cast, the staff step in to fill their roles.
79	5	"The Killing of Sister Dot"	Bob Sweeney	Roger Garrett	October 24, 1987	081
Dot lands a part in a soap opera, until she learns that her character is expected to be killed off the show.
80	6	"The Date Show"	Bob Sweeney	Marc Sotkin	October 31, 1987	079
Nancy demands Howard to accompany her to a square dance as a way to break him out of a mid-life crisis.
81	7	"Search and Strike"	Steve Zuckerman	Roger Garrett	November 7, 1987	082
When Nancy is ordered by hotel management to search her staffs' lockers, Howard draws the line on her invading her waitresses' privacy.
82	8	"The Vegas Show (Part 1)"	Steve Zuckerman	Marc Sotkin	November 14, 1987	085
Nancy is invited by singer Jack Jones to go with him to Las Vegas for a long weekend.
83	9	"The Vegas Show (Part 2)"	Doug Smart	Marc Sotkin	November 21, 1987	086
As the staff follow Nancy to Las Vegas, a jealous Howard finds Nancy at the gambling table with a lounge lizard, while a surprise event awaits the gang upon their arrival.
84	10	"The Sonny's Mother Show"	Gil Junger	Marc Sotkin	November 28, 1987	084
Sonny learns that his mother, who never forgiven him for not pursuing a career in classical music, is coming to visit him.
85	11	"Strictly Personal"	Doug Smart	Roger Garrett	December 12, 1987	088
Dot's personal ad doesn't seem to attract any potential responses from readers.
86	12	"A Pen Pal for Your Thoughts"	J.D. Lobue	Roger Garrett	December 19, 1987	077
Amy's prison pen pal is about to be released from prison. So guess what he plans to do – and plans to spend the rest of his life with – after his release?
87	13	"Twelve Angry Women"	Steve Zuckerman	Alice Miller	December 26, 1987	083
Feminists set their sights on Sonny during their visit at the restaurant. Meanwhile, Dot dates one of Amy's exes.
88	14	"Skin Deep"	Doug Smart	Adam I. Lapidus	January 2, 1988	087
Nancy decides to get a face lift after she notices Howard flirting with a younger woman.
89	15	"Everyone's a Critic"	Bob Sweeney	Roger Garrett	January 16, 1988	092
Dot gets jittery when her journalist boyfriend is assigned to review her new play.
90	16	"Take Back Your Mink"	Paul Kreppel	Tom Whedon	January 23, 1988	090
Thanks to newfound wealth, Richie buys Jan a mink coat. But money doesn't buy happiness, as they're about to find out.
91	17	"The One About The Tattooed Lady"	Bob Sweeney	Alicia Marie Schudt	January 30, 1988	089
Nancy's visiting cousin shows up with her whole body tattooed, shocking Nancy.
92	18	"Daddy's Little Girl"	Bob Sweeney	Tom Whedon	February 6, 1988	091
Jan's hope to reconciling her divorced parents is dashed when her father tells her that he is newly engaged to another woman.
93	19	"Ginger's Grandmother Show"	Gil Junger	Marc Sotkin	February 13, 1988	093
Ginger's grandmother shows up to tell Ginger that her son won't let her drive anymore. Meanwhile, Sonny makes a music video at the restaurant.
94	20	"Dot's Hope"	Steve Zuckerman	Tom Whedon	February 20, 1988	095
Dot gets her visiting friend, who came to Los Angeles to seek fame and fortune, a job as a dishwasher at the restaurant.
95	21	"The Amy and Louie Show"	Marc Sotkin	Story by : Marc Sotkin, Kenny Wolin and Barry Bleach; Teleplay by : Marc Sotkin	February 27, 1988	097
Sonny becomes jealous when Amy asks his friend Louie out on a date. Meanwhile, Ginger feels more like french toast when she goes on a blind date with an egg salesman.
96	22	"Ginger and the Senator"	Paul Kreppel	Gene Braunstein and Bob Perlow	April 23, 1988	100
Ginger makes front page news when she is caught in a Gary Hart-Donna Rice-style situation after she is pictured sitting on the lap of a senator who is up for election.
97	23	"Healings, Nothing More Than Healings"	Christine Ballard	Barry Vigon	April 30, 1988	096
Sonny becomes a hero after he uses the Heimlich maneuver to save a choking victim. Meanwhile, Nancy and Howard decide whether to take separate vacations.
98	24	"The No Guys Show"	Christine Ballard	Roger Garrett	May 7, 1988	098
Ginger's boyfriend wants to tie the knot with her, but she doesn't want to settle down yet.
99	25	"The Waiting Game"	Gil Junger	Roger Garrett, Marc Sotkin and Tom Whedon	May 14, 1988	099
What was supposed to be an interview with a journalist about the pro and cons about their careers turns into a trip down memory lane for the waitresses in this flashback episode.
100	26	"Tune In, Tune Out"	Steve Zuckerman	Kevin Abbott	May 28, 1988	094
Jan's attempt to spice up her marriage to Richie is about to turn sour. Meanwhile, a new TV set in the staff lounge draws the waitresses' attention when they become addicted to a miniseries.

=== Season 6 (1988–1989) ===
No. overall	No. in season	Title	Directed by	Written by	Original release date	Prod. code
101	1	"Pistol Packin' Mama"	Steve Zuckerman	Tom Whedon	October 15, 1988	101
Ginger is considering kicking Amy out of the apartment after Ginger learns that Amy keeps a gun with her.
102	2	"The Nancy and Roscoe Show"	Steve Zuckerman	Marc Sotkin	October 22, 1988	102
Nancy and Howard's marriage is about to be put to the test when Howard's Navy buddy Roscoe shows up and Nancy falls for him.
103	3	"The Jan's Pregnant Show"	Steve Zuckerman	Marc Sotkin	October 29, 1988	103
The news of Jan's pregnancy is about to put Richie's plans to move to North Dakota on hold.
104	4	"Never Trust Anyone Under 40"	Steve Zuckerman	Tom Whedon	November 5, 1988	104
Louie throws a surprise 40th birthday party that even has Howard feeling 40 again.
105	5	"The New Guy Show"	Steve Zuckerman	Roger Garrett	November 12, 1988	105
Ginger telephones a wedding photographer for a date. Meanwhile, Sonny's agent (Willie Garson) lands him an hour-long TV time slot.
106	6	"Rear Window"	Gil Junger	Roger Garrett	November 19, 1988	106
Dot's voyerism of watching her neighbors through her window is about to take a suspicious turn when she witnesses what she thinks is a murder of a woman.
107	7	"You Do Voodoo"	Steve Zuckerman	Julie Fleischer	November 26, 1988	107
Jan wants to stop a developer from building a new mini-mall in her neighborhood. Meanwhile, Ginger uses a book of voodoo spells to attract a date.
108	8	"The Amy and Bobby Show"	Jules Lichtman	Marc Sotkin	December 3, 1988	108
Amy dates a guy who has pentecostal ambitions to change her lifestyle. Meanwhile, Howard is unaware that he just gave Nancy merchandise that was recently stolen.
109	9	"Dot Casts Off"	Neema Barnette	Roger Garrett	December 10, 1988	109
Dot lands a job as a casting assistant and is given the task to audition her friend for an acting job.
110	10	"A Very Scary It's a Living"	Marc Sotkin	Roger Garrett	January 7, 1989	110
After Dot lands a major movie role in a slasher film, she decides to learn more about her role by watching horror flicks, only to fall asleep and end up in a dream, which really turns into a nightmare at the restaurant.
111	11	"The Ginger's Mother Show"	Paul Kreppel	Marc Sotkin	January 14, 1989	111
Ginger decides not to talk about her career as a waitress when her successful career-oriented mother pays her daughter a visit.
112	12	"Mike Fright"	Steve Zuckerman	Tom Whedon	January 21, 1989	113
Sonny learns that his temporary replacement is more successful than he is.
113	13	"I Never Sang For My Father"	Gil Junger	Tom Whedon	January 28, 1989	112
Sonny is excited when his hairdresser (Jane Leeves) decides to move in with him. But his plan to romance her is blocked by a surprise visit from his father. Meanwhile, Jan wants know who has been using the home phone to dial 1-900 numbers.
114	14	"Just Say Yes"	Neema Barnette	Tom Whedon	February 11, 1989	114
Amy isn't sure of what to do after she receives a Valentine's Day gift from her boyfriend Bobby Lee, which happens to be a key to his hotel room.
115	15	"Wedding, Wedding"	Steve Zuckerman	Roger Garrett	February 18, 1989	115
Amy and Ginger decide to hold a double wedding at the restaurant.
116	16	"It's Dark at the Top of the Top"	Paul Kreppel	Tom Whedon	February 25, 1989	117
Nancy learns that favoring a new hotel manager's ideas can even cost you a job—so the manager replaces her with Dot.
117	17	"My Little Red Book"	Steve Zuckerman	Roger Garrett	March 4, 1989	116
Sonny discovers a little black book that leads to a smokin' hot catch for the pianist-who turns out to be a Russian spy.
118	18	"Matchmaker, Matchmaker"	Gil Junger	Alicia Marie Schudt	March 11, 1989	118
Sonny is set up with a new singing partner, while Dot decides to enlists a marriage broker.
119	19	"A Very Special It's a Living"	Marc Sotkin	Marc Sotkin	March 18, 1989	120
As Jan suddenly goes into premature labor, her life and her baby's hang in the balance. While she is in the hospital, Jan has a strange dream that she is being visited by the angel of death (played by Danny Thomas).
120	20	"The Sonny and Dot Show"	Steve Zuckerman, Gil Junger, Paul Kreppel and Neema Barnette	Roger Garrett, Marc Sotkin and Tom Whedon	April 8, 1989	119
Dot and Sonny decide to cry on each other's shoulders as they both feel a sense of loneliness in their lives.
