= Sam Freed =

American actor

- Born: August 29, 1948 (age 76); York, Pennsylvania, U.S.
- Education: Penn State, BA in Theater, 1970
- Occupation: Actor
- Years active: 1971–present
- Spouse: Barrie Youngfellow (m. 1983; died 2022)

Sam Freed (born August 29, 1948) is an American actor who has performed on Broadway and television and in movies. His first major regular role on television was as Bob Barsky in the last three seasons of Kate & Allie. In the short-lived series Ferris Bueller, he played Bill Bueller, the father of the title character. He also portrayed James C. Whiting III, the executive editor of The Baltimore Sun, in the fifth and final season of The Wire.

He was married to late actress Barrie Youngfellow, who starred on the 1980s ABC-TV/syndicated sitcom series It's a Living.

== Early life ==
Sam Freed was the youngest of six children of a traveling salesman father and a homemaker mother. He graduated from York Suburban Senior High School and began developing his acting skills at the York Little Theatre. He earned a Bachelor of Arts degree in Theatre from Penn State in 1970. His first production at the university was Under Milk Wood. While he apprenticed with Festival Theatre, he first met Barrie Youngfellow, whom he would eventually marry.

== Acting career ==
Freed was immediately hired after graduation by Jon Jory at the Actors Theatre of Louisville. After moving to New York City in January 1971, he performed in dinner and summer theatres and helped build theatrical scenery. Later that year, he joined The Proposition, an improvisational comedy revue which at the time also featured Jane Curtin. After guest appearances on numerous series, Freed made his TV-movie debut in Lady of the House (1978).

== Kate and Allie ==
Freed played three different characters on Kate & Allie, two of them as a guest star. In "Candidate," Season 2's fifth episode which originally aired on November 5, 1984, he was Jonathan Conti, a political contender who entered into a brief extramarital relationship with Allie Lowell (Jane Curtin). In "Late Bloomer," the Season 3 finale first shown on May 12, 1986, he was Keith, the ex-boyfriend of Julia Peterson (Lindsay Wagner). The episode, which also featured Barbara Barrie, Roger Bowen and Mercedes Ruehl, was originally a backdoor pilot with the same name, but it was never realized.

Freed's debut as Bob Barsky, a retired professional football player working as a local television sportscaster, was in "Dates of Future Past," the twelfth installment of Season 4 from December 15, 1986. Barsky's first encounter with Allie in a grocery store was the start of a romantic relationship that culminated in their marriage early in the program's sixth and final season. By that time, Freed had become a series regular.
