= Dalton Cathey =

American actor (1946–1990)

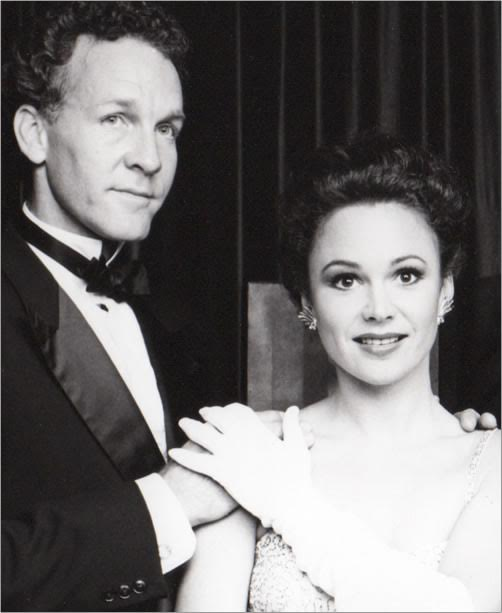
- Cathey with Gail Edwards in All About Eve.
- Born: October 12, 1946; Tallahassee, Florida, U.S.
- Died: December 31, 1990 (aged 44); Los Angeles, California, U.S.
- Occupation: Actor
- Years active: 1966-1990

Dalton Cathey (October 12, 1946 – December 31, 1990) was an American actor. He appeared in numerous films and TV series throughout the 1960s to the 1990s.

== Biography ==
Cathey was born in Tallahassee, Florida in 1946. He began his acting career in 1966, appearing in the film, The Emperor's New Clothes.

During the 1980s he continued his appearances on film and television series like, Hotel, Webster, Falcon Crest, Amazing Stories, Black Moon Rising, Weekend Warriors, Dynasty, Miami Vice, Hooperman, Designing Women, The Famous Teddy Z and Equal Justice.

He also founded the Livingroom Theater in Los Angeles, where he produced and directed a version of All About Eve.

== Death ==
Cathey died of AIDS on December 31, 1990, in Los Angeles, California. He was survived by his parents and a brother.

== Selected filmography ==
=== Film ===
- The Emperor's New Clothes (1966) – Ragoon
- Breakdance (1984) – Producer #1
- Black Moon Rising (1986) – Maitre D'
- Weekend Warriors (1986) – Cop #1

=== Television ===
- Hotel (1983) – Maitre d'
- Never Again (1984) – Allen
- Webster (1984) – The Secretary
- Falcon Crest (1985) – Drug Rehab Manager
- Knots Landing (1985) – Landlord
- Amazing Stories (1985) – Doctor
- Dynasty (1986) – Desk Clerk
- Miami Vice (1986) – Guard Ruzik
- Hooperman (1987) – I, Witness
- Designing Women (1988) – Roland
- The Famous Teddy Z (1990) – Teddy's Big Date
- Equal Justice (1990) – Clerk
