= Emmanuel Lewis =

American actor (born 1971)

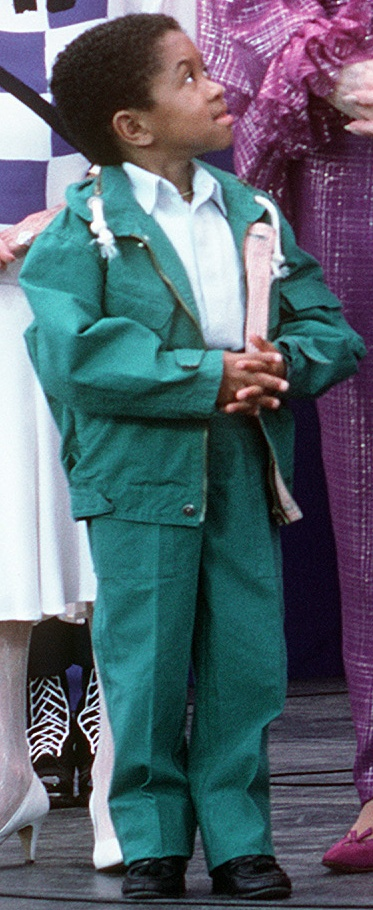
- Emmanuel Lewis in 1987
- Born: March 9, 1971 (age 55); New York City, U.S.
- Education: Clark Atlanta University (BA, 1997)
- Occupation: Actor
- Years active: 1980–2008
- Known for: Playing the title character in Webster

Emmanuel Lewis (born March 9, 1971) is an American retired actor who played the title character in the sitcom Webster. He was one of American television's biggest stars in the mid-1980s.

== Early life, family and education ==
Lewis was born in Brooklyn, New York, to mother Margaret Lewis. He is one of four siblings (sister Lizzie and brothers Roscoe and Christopher). He and his older brother Christopher learned to tap dance and performed onstage, including a televised performance beside Jerry Lewis at his 1985 MDA Labor Day Telethon.

He attended public schools in Brooklyn, including Midwood High School. He graduated from Clark Atlanta University with a degree in theater arts in 1997. His brother Christopher also attended school there.

== Career ==
=== Child actor and singer ===
He began his acting career at working in commercials, including for Campbell's Soup, Life cereal, and Burger King. Lewis was unusually short, reaching only 3 ft 0 in (0.91 m) at age 12, which enabled him to play child roles younger than his actual age. Over his career, he appeared in at least 60 commercials.

ABC programming chief Lew Erlicht saw Lewis in a Burger King commercial and ordered a show developed for him. At the time, rival network NBC was having ratings success with Diff'rent Strokes, a sitcom that featured a short African-American boy living with a white adoptive parent. Rather than create a new show, ABC added Lewis to a program already in development named Another Ballgame, starring Alex Karras and Susan Clark, and recentered it around Lewis's character, Webster Long, a seven-year-old child orphaned when his parents died in a car accident. Another Ballgame was retitled Then Came You then Webster before its premiere.

For his role, Lewis was nominated for four Young Artist Awards. He won other awards as well, include three People's Choice Awards, and two Clio Awards, at least one of which was for a Burger King commercial. He has been a member of American Federation of Television and Radio Artists, Screen Actors Guild, and Actors' Equity Association. He appeared on many magazine covers, including at least four TV Guide covers and two Ebony covers.

Webster was a success for ABC, finishing in the Nielsen Top 30 for its first three seasons before dropping off in its fourth. ABC canceled the show, but it continued in first-run syndication for two more seasons, making six in total. Despite playing a child, Lewis was 18 years old when the series ended. Lewis hosted his own variety show TV special in 1987.

In Japan, Lewis released two music singles. His debut single, "City Connection," reached number 2 on the Oricon chart.

=== Media appearances as an adult ===
Lewis appeared as himself on a TV child stars episode of Weakest Link in 2001. He was voted off in the third round. He had cameo appearances in the 2007 film Kickin' It Old Skool and a 2013 episode of Between Two Ferns with Zach Galifianakis.

On November 9, 2014, Lewis appeared on Ken Reid's TV Guidance Counselor podcast. The episode was recorded live at the Somerville Theatre in Somerville, Massachusetts as part of the 2014 Boston Comedy Festival. He appears in Lil Jon & The East Side Boyz's "I Don't Give A F" video, at the 30-second mark.

=== Beyond performing ===
Emmanuel Lewis has several businesses, including Emmanuel Lewis Entertainment Enterprises, Inc., the production company that was formed during his youth. Global Entertainment Media Company and Authentically Organic are two of his other endeavors.

He is president of the Radio, Music & Film Alliance of Georgia and chairman of the board of the Thomas W. Dortch Jr. Foundation.

== Personal life ==
Lewis's short stature was a noticeable trait, but he eventually grew to 4 ft 3 in (1.3 m) in adulthood.

After college in Atlanta, Lewis remained in the area. He is a practitioner of taekwondo. He is also a Prince Hall Freemason and a member of W.C. Thomas Lodge #112 F&AM, PHA in Atlanta.

== Filmography ==
- Webster (1983–1989) (TV series)
- The Love Boat (1984), episode "Only the Good Die Young"
- A Christmas Dream (1984) (TV special)
- Lost in London (1985) (TV)
- Emmanuel Lewis: My Very Own Show (1987) (TV)
- The New Adventures of Mother Goose (1995) (TV)
- In the House (1996), episode "Close Encounters of the Worst Kind”
- Family Matters (1997), episodes "Odd Man In" and "Beauty and the Beast"
- Moesha (1998) (TV)
- Malcolm & Eddie (1999) (TV)
- Good vs. Evil (1999), episode "Buried"
- Weakest Link – TV Child Stars Edition (2001) (TV)
- The Surreal Life (2003) (TV)
- Dickie Roberts: Former Child Star (2003)
- My Super Sweet Sixteen (2005) (TV)
- One on One (2005) (TV)
- Kickin' It Old Skool (2007)
- The Surreal Life: Fame Games (2007) (TV)
- The Lil Flex Show (2008) (TV)

== Discography ==
- "City Connection" (シティコネクション, City Konekushon) (July 5, 1981)
  - B side: City Connection (English Version)
  - Lyrics: Mickey Sugar, Composer: Danny Long (pseudonym of Daiko Nagato), arranger: Michel SHIMIN, Yuka Sato
- "Love is DANDAN" (恋はダンダン, ”Koi wa Dan Dan") (October 5, 1981)
  - Lyrics: Junko Shiratori, composer: Daiko Nagato, arranger: Masao Nakajima
