= J.D. Lobue =

American television director

- Born: John David Lobue; Hammond, Louisiana, U.S.
- Education: Bachelor's degree from University of Mississippi
- Alma mater: Ole Miss
- Occupation: Television director
- Years active: 1972 - present
- Known for: Directing situation comedies and musical variety shows
- Awards: DGA Award for Soap

John David Lobue is an American television director best known for his work on Soul Train, Soap, Newhart, It's a Living, Dharma & Greg, Two and a Half Men, and other television series. Lobue purchased a Studio City residence in Los Angeles from local modernist architect Michael Pearce and lived there for 2 years before selling it to Dennis Miller in 1988.
