= Webster (TV series) =

American television sitcom (1983–1989)

- Title card from Season 1
- Genre: Sitcom
- Created by: Stu Silver
- Directed by: Joel Zwick (1983–1986); Lee Bernhardi (1986–1989)
- Starring: Susan Clark; Alex Karras; Emmanuel Lewis; Henry Polic II; Cathryn Damon; Eugene Roche
- Theme music composer: Steve Nelson; Madeline Sunshine
- Opening theme: "Then Came You", performed by Steve Nelson and Gail Lopata Lennon (both uncredited)
- Composer: Steve Nelson
- Country of origin: United States
- Original language: English
- No. of seasons: 6
- No. of episodes: 150 (list of episodes)

Production
- Executive producers: Stu Silver (1983); Bill D'Angelo (1983–1984); Bruce Johnson (1984–1989); Steven Sunshine (1984–1985); Madeline Sunshine (1984–1985); Bob Brunner (1986–1989); Ken Hecht (1986–1989)
- Producers: Bruce Johnson (1983–1984); Steven Sunshine (1983–1984); Madeline Sunshine (1983–1984); Tom Tenowich (1984–1985); Judy Pioli (1985–1986); Dave Hackel (1985–1986); April Kelly (1985–1986); Fred Rubin (1986–1989); Nancy Steen (1986–1988); Neil Thompson (1986–1988); Simon Muntner (1988–1989)
- Camera setup: Multi-camera
- Running time: 24–25 minutes (ABC); 21–22 minutes (first-run syndication)
- Production companies: Georgian Bay Ltd.; Emmanuel Lewis Entertainment Enterprises (1986–1989); Paramount Network Television (1983–1987); Paramount Domestic Television (1987–1989)

Original release
- Network: ABC
- Release: September 16, 1983 – May 8, 1987
- Network: Syndication
- Release: September 21, 1987 – March 10, 1989

Webster is an American sitcom television series that aired on ABC from September 16, 1983 to May 8, 1987 and in first-run syndication from September 21, 1987 to March 10, 1989. The series was created by Stu Silver.

The show stars Emmanuel Lewis in the title role as a young boy who, after losing his parents, is adopted by his NFL-pro godfather, portrayed by Alex Karras, and his new socialite wife, played by Susan Clark. The focus was largely on how this impulsively married couple had to adjust to their new lives and sudden parenthood, but it was the congenial Webster himself who drove much of the plot. The series was produced by Georgian Bay Ltd., Emmanuel Lewis Entertainment Enterprises, Inc. (1986–1989) and Paramount Television (Network 1983–1987, Domestic 1987–1989).

== Synopsis ==
The show, set in Chicago, revolves around Webster Long (Emmanuel Lewis), a 5-year-old African American orphan whose biological parents, Travis and Gert Long, were recently killed in a car accident. He is taken in by his godfather, retired football star George Papadopolis (Alex Karras), with whom Travis had played professional football in the 1970s, and his wife Katherine (Susan Clark), an upper crust socialite with zero housekeeping skills. George and Katherine's new married life was part of the premise, but it was Webster who was the main focus of the show. The Papadopolises lived in a luxurious high-rise apartment in Chicago, with burly George now working as a sportscaster at local station WBJX-TV, and Katherine working as a consumer advocate, later becoming a family psychologist.

Although the series is set in Chicago, the apartment complex shown in exterior shots of the first two seasons is actually The Mirabella condominium building, located at 10430 Wilshire Blvd, in the Westwood district of Los Angeles, California.

Sarcastic social climber Jerry Silver (Henry Polic II) was Katherine's secretary, as well as her professional and personal confidant. Webster also had an uncle, Phillip Long (Ben Vereen) who first appeared near the end of the first season. Phillip had issues with Webster living with a white couple (creating acrimony between him and George) and sought to adopt him and take him to live in Chicago's South Side. After his numerous attempts at this during the second season, Phillip moved to Hollywood to launch an acting career. In the later seasons, Phillip would return in a few guest appearances.

Shortly after being adopted, Webster started calling George by his first name but calling Katherine "Ma'am." In one episode Katherine asked Webster why he used such a formal name, and he explained that he was calling her as close to "Mom" as he could without disrespecting his birth mother. George often called Webster "Web."

Shortly into the second season, Webster accidentally burned down the family's apartment with a science kit, and the Papadopolises had to leave the high-rise. In the next episode, the family moved to a large Victorian house located at 1432 North State Parkway in Chicago's Gold Coast (41.908825°N 87.628949°W). Bill and Cassie Parker (Eugene Roche and Cathryn Damon) were the gregarious middle-aged couple who leased the house to the Papadopolises while they moved into a basement apartment below. Bill, a craftsman/shop teacher, and Cassie, an editor of high-profile romantic and crime novels, were taking in rent in order to complete the numerous additions they were making to the property. George and Bill, despite the competitiveness that occurred between them, became good buddies; Cassie and Katherine became each other's confidants; and Webster easily became the apple of the Parkers' eye, often retreating to the basement for special quality time with them.

Later in the second season, a thread of drama was added when the Parkers' estranged daughter Maggie Parker (guest star Jennifer Holmes) appeared for a tearful-reunion episode, complete with a son. Bill and Cassie also had a son named Regis, who was referred to but never seen.

Many more of Webster's friends and classmates passed through, including Rob Whitaker (Chad Allen). A recent "divorce kid" living with his mother, Rob was kidnapped by his father in one episode, and the Papadopolises and the community rallied to help Rob's mother find him. When he returned, it was Katherine who successfully intervened with his father. Later in the third season, Rob's last name inexplicably became Joiner.

Bill and Cassie disappeared after the third season; Cathryn Damon had left the series upon being diagnosed with ovarian cancer (which ultimately took her life in May 1987), and instead of recasting her role, Eugene Roche was dropped as well so that their characters would not have to be used. Damon and Roche were no longer credited on the show beginning with the season four premiere, nor were their characters evident in that episode; in the second episode of the season ("The Landlords", aired September 26, 1986), it was finally explained that the Parkers had moved to Florida, resulting in George and Katherine buying their house outright.

Jerry, who was a more prominent member of the show in the first season (receiving the "co-starring" heading in the opening credits after the show's three leads), had since become an occasional character, but would continue for the entire series. George's jovial aging father, George Sr. (Jack Kruschen), known to all as "Papa" Papadopolis, first showed up in a couple of guest appearances in the second season, before joining as a recurring cast member in the fall of 1985. The following season, three more of Webster's friends/classmates had recurring roles—Roger (Carl Steven), Timmy (Danny McMurphy) and Tommy (Gabe Witcher). Benny (Nick DeMauro) was the proprietor of Benny's, a malt shop in downtown Chicago where many of the series regulars started frequenting midway through the fourth season. This setting was in many respects a revival of The Trocadero, an earlier malt shop featured in a few second-season episodes, whose owner, Maurice, was played in guest appearances by Richard Karron.

== Production history ==
When Alex Karras and Susan Clark married in real life, they started their own production company, Georgian Bay Ltd. ABC approached the couple about a sitcom development deal which resulted in a proposed romantic-comedy series, Another Ballgame, to star Karras as an ex-NFL player who quickly found true love with a socialite consumer advocate (Clark) on a cruise. ABC picked it up for the fall 1983 schedule, with Paramount Television as packager, but major changes would occur before the premiere.

After seeing Emmanuel Lewis in a Burger King commercial, ABC's programming chief, Lew Erlicht, wanted to give the actor his own series. At this time, Another Ballgame creator Stu Silver desired to develop an original show based on the lead characters portrayed by Katharine Hepburn and Spencer Tracy in the film Woman of the Year and saw Alex Karras and Susan Clark's on-screen chemistry as being strikingly reminiscent of this.

The network felt the need to cast Lewis in a project quickly, before he grew another inch (like child actor Gary Coleman, who was also small for his age, Lewis would end up at 4 ft 3 in (1.30 m)). With the number of comedy pilots ABC had greenlit for that fall's schedule, it was likely that Lewis would not be able to secure his own series and timeslot unless he was worked into already-existing comedy projects. So, among other series, co-producers on Another Ballgame were approached about working Lewis into the show. Stars Karras and Clark liked the idea of the sudden marriage and instant adoption of a young black boy, and the Webster character was thus created.

The premise of Webster's parents' death, and his inclusion into the Papadopoulos household, originated with the second phase of the pilot, which had the show's title changed to Then Came You. Executives soon made it clear that the show's major focus would be on the Webster character, instead of it being a split romantic/family comedy. The character of George Papadopolis' buddy and broadcasting colleague, played by Art LaFleur, was summarily dropped from the regular cast; once getting to air, LaFleur only appeared in the pilot.

Karras and Clark did not approve this round of changes, as creative control was still in their hands with Georgian Bay. However, Clark originally prevented their co-producers and ABC from changing the series' title to Webster, since she wanted to maintain the ensemble aspect of the series. While early promotions for the sitcom carried the title Then Came You, network politics would end up violating Clark's request; ABC executives ultimately settled on Webster just before its fall premiere.

Webster premiered in September 1983 and was an instant hit. From the start, the final product was drawing close comparisons to NBC's popular Diff'rent Strokes, which featured the diminutive Gary Coleman as a young black boy adopted by a white family. The main differences, however, were that Lewis' character of Webster Long had an adoptive mother and father from the start who had no children, whereas Coleman's character Arnold Jackson and his older brother Willis (Todd Bridges) were adopted by a widower with a daughter Kimberly (Dana Plato). Also, Coleman's short stature was due to a congenital kidney condition, whereas Lewis was completely healthy and had no pre-existing condition to explain his height. Eventually, in the fall of 1985, Webster would be joined on ABC's Friday night lineup by Diff'rent Strokes, when the latter moved to ABC for what turned out to be its eighth and final season.

Despite the early success, the show that made it to the air as Webster was not what Karras and Clark foresaw as their ideal starring vehicle. The first season was fraught with tension, between the couple's disagreements and their protests with Paramount and ABC. After the initial episodes that set up the show's premise (George and Katherine's wedding, Webster's arrival, and the resulting adjustments) were shot, most of the plots became exclusively Webster-driven, even though it was the writers' intention to include story elements that focused on George and Katherine as much as possible. The show's married stars won many of the early script disputes, and several first-season episodes did focus on the new marriage and lives of the adult leads. The in-fighting on set continued, and especially had an effect on Lewis. Reportedly, Lewis was often whisked away from the set whenever Karras and Clark argued and demanded rewrites. It became so severe that Lewis blamed the trouble on himself.

Main cast of Webster: (L-R) Susan Clark, Emmanuel Lewis, Alex Karras

After the first season ended, ABC stopped pushing hard for "all Webster, all the time". Paramount eventually came to an agreement with Karras and Clark that they would continue to receive prominent storylines for their characters. In the long run, the series did become part romantic and part family-oriented, as Clark and Karras wanted it to be; the series was also regarded for handling Webster's childhood stories in a more sophisticated, intelligent fashion than other comedies of the time that relied on preachy, heavy-handed morals to tell a story. The only condition that Paramount laid out for Clark and Karras was that Lewis, whom ABC saw as a money maker above all else, would get production credit alongside them. As a result, "Emmanuel Lewis Entertainment Enterprises, Inc." was launched in 1986, acting as another production company for Webster starting in its fourth season.

By season three at the latest, the stormy relations of the first season disappeared on set. The main cast bonded well from then on, with Karras becoming a surrogate father figure to Lewis. Webster director Joel Zwick, in his interview for the 2003 E! True Hollywood Story on Lewis, remarked that, "As far as TV sitcom families go, it took them longer than most to acclimate to each other."

Over the course of the fourth season, ratings dropped sharply. The show, which had been a Nielsen top 30 series, ranked 46th by the end of the season. Although ABC still saw Lewis especially as a bankable star, having recently featured him in his first self-headlined prime-time special (Emmanuel Lewis: My Very Own Show, which aired in February 1987 and featured Lewis performing alongside Sammy Davis Jr., Bob Hope and other big-name celebrities), the network felt that Webster was past its peak in terms of ratings, and was unsure that it would ever regain the higher numbers it had during the early seasons. Having been the Friday night 8 p.m. anchor since March 1985, Webster moved back to the "protected" time slot of 8:30/7:30 on Fridays in March 1987. ABC announced the series' cancellation in May.

=== Cancellation and move to syndication ===
Even though Webster had seen its overall ratings decline leading into its cancellation, the series had always drawn a large audience of younger viewers; in fact, Webster's largest audience was children.

At the time of the cancellation of Webster by ABC, there was a trend in syndication of seeing various television series that had been cancelled by the three major networks find new life as weekly syndicated series (examples of the time including Too Close for Comfort, Mama's Family, Charles in Charge, Fame, 9 to 5, It's a Living, and Punky Brewster). Even before Webster fell out of the Nielsen top 30 on ABC, Paramount had signed an exclusive deal with the show's producers to continue the show in first-run syndication if the network eventually had reason to cancel it before it reached its 100th episode. (This package deal also gave the same option to the Paramount-produced Cheers and Family Ties, if either of them were to see an early demise on NBC, but both series enjoyed long runs on that network.)

Although Webster managed to hit its hundredth episode at the end of its final season on ABC, Paramount decided to exercise their option to keep the show in production. By doing this Paramount was no longer bound by network standards and could easily target the young audience that made up the majority of its Webster viewer base. Paramount's syndication arm began a drive to sell the series to local stations, and enough bought the series to enable a fifth season to be produced.

Webster's fifth season premiered in syndication on September 21, 1987, with a three-episode story arc which saw Webster, George, and Katherine head to San Francisco. Beginning with the fourth episode of the season, the Papadopolis household gained a new member in George's nephew Nicky (Corin Nemec), who moved in when his parents went off to work in Nigeria on assignment for the United Nations. Nicky provided Webster with a sort of "brother figure", and the two got along famously. However, Nicky was gone from the show at the start of season six (Nemec would later reach greater fame as the star of Fox's Parker Lewis Can't Lose). Although no longer a regular when the series moved to first-run syndication, Papa Papadopolis continued to make a few guest appearances during the fifth and sixth seasons, as did Webster's friend Tommy and malt shop owner Benny.

While the lead character's plots continued to mature somewhat with Webster's onset of pre-teendom, the same "cutesy factor" remained, thanks in part to Lewis' timing and portrayal. However, this was something Lewis was slowly tiring of, despite the fact that he had more creative control over Webster at this point. Now 17 years old and about to complete his high school education (which was followed by his enrollment at Clark Atlanta University in 1989), Lewis did not have the desire to continue portraying a character roughly half his age. Ultimately, due to Lewis' height, the character of Webster Long was only depicted between the ages of 6 and 12 years old over the show's six seasons. Early in the 1988–89 season, with Lewis clearly outgrowing the title role, Karras and Clark also decided that the time was right to move on. Webster's sixth season was announced to be its last, with the finale airing on March 10, 1989. Instead of a typical series finale, the last episode—titled "Webtrek"—saw Webster go on an adventure aboard the Starship Enterprise from the series' Paramount-produced sibling, Star Trek: The Next Generation. There, he interacts with Lt. Worf (Michael Dorn) from TNG, whom Webster attempts to humanize, while a series of Webster flashbacks are shown that depict the concept of feelings.

== Cast ==
=== Main cast ===
- Susan Clark as Katherine Calder-Young Papadopoulos
- Alex Karras as George Papadopoulos
- Emmanuel Lewis as Webster Long
- Henry Polic II as Jerry Silver
- Cathryn Damon as Cassie Parker (1984–1986)
- Eugene Roche as Bill Parker (1984–1986)

=== Recurring cast ===
- Ben Vereen as Uncle Phillip Long (1984–1985)
- Jack Kruschen as George "Papa" Papadopoulos, Sr. (1985–1989)
- Chad Allen as Rob Whitaker/Joiner (1985–1986)
- Carl Steven as Petey/Roger (1983–1987)
- Danny McMurphy as Timmy/Andy (1986–1987)
- Gabe Witcher as Tommy (1987–1989)
- Nick DeMauro as Umpire/Benny (1986–1988)
- Corin Nemec as Nicky Papadopoulos (1987–1988) (credited as Corin "Corky" Nemec)

=== Notable guest stars ===
- Heather O'Rourke as Melanie (season 1)
- Harrison Page as Travis Long (flashback sequence, season 1)
- Bumper Robinson as Curtis (season 1)
- Richard Karron as Maurice (seasons 1–2)
- Neva Patterson as Emily Calder-Young, Katherine's mother (seasons 2–3)
- The Four Tops as themselves (seasons 4, 5 and 6)
- Tiffany Brissette as Kathy (season 2)
- Alison Sweeney as Beth ("The Uh-Oh Feeling", season 2)
- Mayim Bialik as Frieda (seasons 5–6)
- Frank Gifford as himself (season 2)
- Diahann Carroll as herself (season 2)
- Jack Elam as Dusty ("How the West Was Once", season 3)
- Alan Autry as Jack ("How the West Was Once", season 3)
- Norman Fell as Charlie ("Almost Home", season 3)
- Mac Davis as "Uncle" Jake Tyler ("Almost Home", season 3)
- Faith Ford as Terry Berman ("Almost Home", season 3)
- Patrick Ewing as himself ("One More Shot", season 3)
- John Thompson as himself ("One More Shot", season 3)
- Harold Sylvester as Mr. Moorepark ("McGruff", season 4)
- Julia Migenes as herself ("Leave it to Diva", season 4)
- Michael Dorn as Lt. Worf ("Webtrek", season 6)
- John Astin as Katherine's wealthy uncle ("Simple Gifts", season 5 and "Rich Man, Poor Man", season 6)

== Episodes ==
| Season | Episodes | Originally released | | | Rank | Rating |
| Season | Episodes | First released | Last released | Network | Rank | Rating |
|---|---|---|---|---|---|---|
| 1 | 22 | September 16, 1983 | May 4, 1984 | ABC | 25 | 17.2 (Tied with The CBS Tuesday Night Movie, Alice, Knight Rider and Hardcastle and McCormick) |
| 2 | 26 | September 21, 1984 | April 5, 1985 (+ 2 aired later) | ABC | 25 | 17.0 (Tied with Monday Night Football and Remington Steele) |
| 3 | 29 | September 20, 1985 | May 2, 1986 (+ 4 aired later) | ABC | —N/a | —N/a |
| 4 | 23 | September 19, 1986 | May 8, 1987 | ABC | —N/a | —N/a |
| 5 | 25 | September 21, 1987 | April 11, 1988 | Syndicated | —N/a | —N/a |
| 6 | 25 | September 9, 1988 | March 10, 1989 | Syndicated | —N/a | —N/a |

== Nielsen ratings ==
- 1983–84: #26 (17.47 rating)
- 1984–85: #22 (17.46 rating)
- 1985–86: #41 (15.30 rating)
- 1986–87: #46 (13.80 rating)

== U.S. syndication ==
ABC aired reruns of Webster on its daytime schedule from December 1986 to July 1987. In addition to its continuation as a weekly series in syndication for 1987, and since Webster reached the so-called "magic number" of 100 episodes before ABC's cancellation decision, Paramount began distributing reruns of the four previous seasons to local stations alongside the new episodes produced for syndication. When the series ended in 1989, the syndicated Webster episodes were added to the rerun package.

USA Network aired reruns of the show from September 22, 1997, to March 13, 1998. It also aired on Superstation WGN from September 21, 1998, to September 2, 1999 (which was, until 2016, the last time that Webster appeared on national television).

Webster also aired on Chicago's local station MeTV and WMEU-CA (now known as MeTV's sister station MeToo since March 2008) from 2006 to 2009. It aired on Antenna TV on weekend afternoons from June 4, 2016, as the leadoff program of its "Saturday Summerthons" marathon programming stunt when it first began, to December 27, 2020.

=== Streaming ===
Hulu acquired rights to stream all seasons of Webster, from June 2014, to March 2018.

On September 10, 2021, Pluto TV announced that they would stream classic CBS shows (which involves Webster), including The Brady Bunch, The Odd Couple, etc. In October 2021, the show was added to Pluto TV.

== Home media ==
Shout! Factory (under license from CBS Home Entertainment) has released the first four seasons on DVD in Region 1.

On October 9, 2012, Shout! Factory released a 20 episode best-of set entitled Webster- 20 Timeless Episodes.

| DVD name | Ep # | Release date |
|---|---|---|
| Season One | 22 | January 25, 2011 |
| Season Two | 26 | May 10, 2011 |
| Season Three | 29 | August 9, 2011 |
| Season Four | 23 | January 17, 2012 |

== See also ==
- Adoption in the United States
- Interracial adoption
- Diff'rent Strokes (1978)
