= Barrie Youngfellow =

American actress (1946–2022)

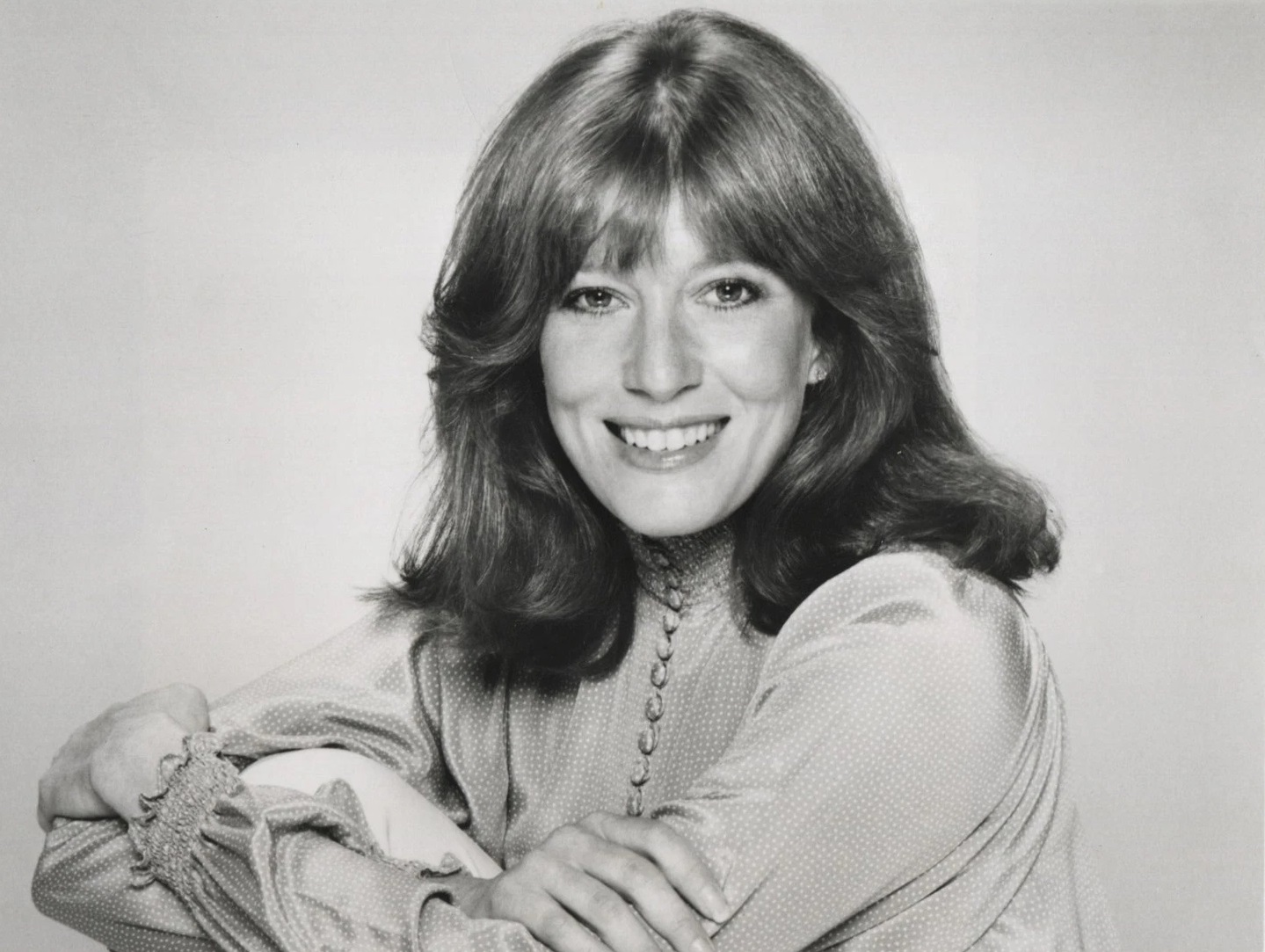
- Youngfellow in 1980
- Born: Barrie Sarah Rivchun; October 22, 1946; Cleveland, Ohio, U.S.
- Died: March 28, 2022 (aged 75); Woodstock, New York, U.S.
- Occupation: Actress
- Years active: 1973–1998
- Known for: It's a Living; The Scarlett O'Hara War
- Spouses: Michael Mund Youngfellow (m. 1968; div. 1975) Sam Freed (m. 1983)

Barrie Youngfellow Freed (born Barrie Sarah Rivchun; October 22, 1946 – March 28, 2022) was an American actress. She was the wife of stage and screen actor Sam Freed.

== Career ==
Youngfellow was born in Cleveland, Ohio, and began her career there in stage productions of Peter Pan.

She appeared in a small role in a 1973 episode of The New Temperatures Rising Show. She appeared as a guest in episodes of numerous American television shows of the 1970s and 1980s, including Emergency!, The Streets of San Francisco, Fernwood 2 Night, WKRP in Cincinnati, Barney Miller, The Jeffersons and Three's Company. She also starred in numerous films and made-for-TV movies including Nightmare in Blood (1978), Vampire (1979), It Came Upon the Midnight Clear (1984), The Lady from Yesterday (1985) and The Scarlett O'Hara War (1980), in which she portrayed Joan Crawford.

Youngfellow is perhaps best known for her role as sharp-tongued and sarcastic waitress Jan Hoffmeyer Gray on the sitcom It's a Living from 1980–82 on ABC and 1985–89 in first-run syndication. She and Gail Edwards, Paul Kreppel and Marian Mercer were the only actors to remain with It's a Living through the show's network and syndication runs.

In 1990, It's a Living producers Paul Junger Witt and Tony Thomas cast Youngfellow in the pilot episode of Blossom, in which she played the mother of Mayim Bialik's title character. However, she did not continue with the project when NBC approved it as a regular series.

In 1998, she made her last television appearance in an episode of Law & Order.

== Personal life ==
Youngfellow was married to Michael Mund Youngfellow from 1968 to 1975. She married stage and screen actor Sam Freed in 1983. They narrated the 2001 audiobook of The Children's Book of Faith by William J. Bennett.

She lived in Woodstock, New York, from 1989 until the time of her death.

== Death ==
Youngfellow died on March 28, 2022, at the age of 75.
