= Gail Edwards =

American retired actress

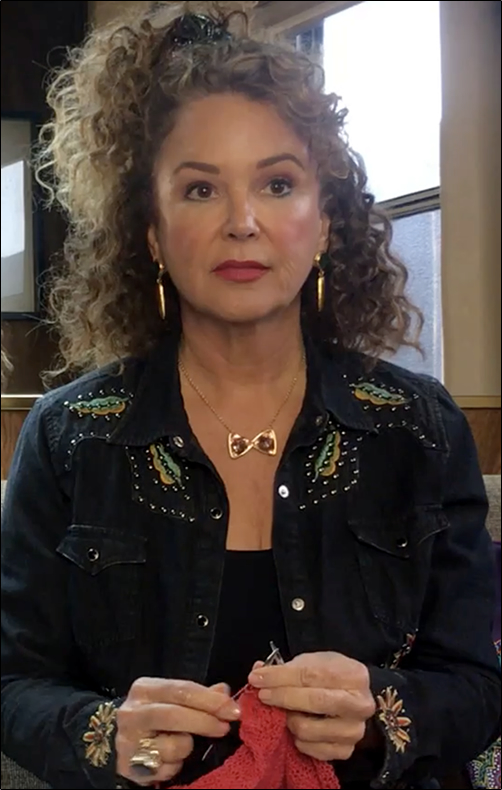
- Edwards in 2017
- Born: United States
- Occupation: Actress
- Years active: 1973–1994, 2017 & 2020
- Spouse: Robert Decker (m. 1986)
- Website: gailedwards.com

Gail Edwards is an American retired actress. She has appeared as Dot Higgins in ABC's It's a Living, Sharon LeMeure in NBC's Blossom, and Vicky Larson in ABC's Full House.

== Early life and education ==
Edwards was raised in Coral Gables, Florida. Her father hung the curtain and lights while she choreographed, costumed, and starred in her own neighborhood musicals. In the sixth grade, Edwards played Little Mary in The Women at the Coconut Grove Playhouse in Coconut Grove, Florida, where playwright George Abbott came backstage to single out her performance.

== Career ==
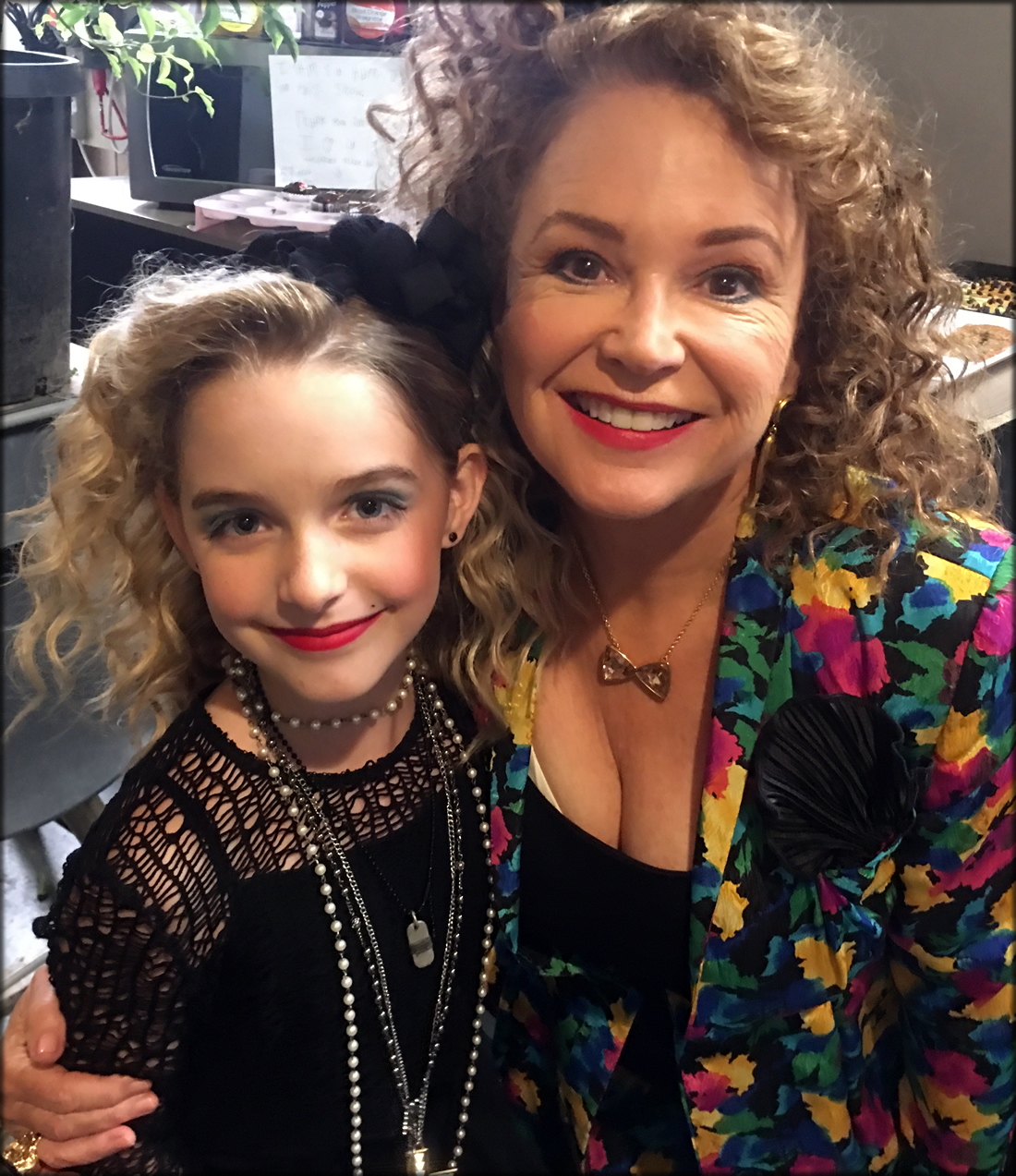
Gail Edwards with Mckenna Grace on the set of Fuller House September 1, 2017

Edwards wrote, produced, and starred in the off-Broadway musical Becoming. It won the Miami Herald Critics’ Choice award three times before the musical debuted in New York. While in New York, Edwards signed with the LeMond/Zetter Management Group. Soon afterward, she landed the role of Sandy opposite Peter Gallagher in Broadway's East Coast tour of Grease. After producing and starring in two additional productions, The Good One and Vanities, both earning her the Drama-Logue Critics' Award, Edwards turned her focus toward television acting.

Upon moving to Los Angeles in 1976, Edwards signed with the Ro Diamond Agency (later with the Gersh Agency) and immediately began landing guest-star roles on such television series as Happy Days, Lou Grant, M*A*S*H and Taxi.

In 1979, Edwards auditioned for a Witt/Thomas production, in which she landed the role of Dot Higgins on ABC's It’s a Living. The series ran on ABC from 1980 to 1982 and was revived in first-run syndication from 1985 to 1989. Edwards, along with Barrie Youngfellow, Paul Kreppel, and Marian Mercer, were the only four members of the It's a Living cast who lasted during the network and syndicated runs. After ABC canceled the show in 1982, Edwards's management was informed by the producers of Happy Days that they were offering her the role of new character K.C. Cunningham, the niece of Howard and Marion Cunningham who was moving in with the family. Without informing Edwards of the offer, her management declined the opportunity, reportedly stating that they did not want Edwards "playing a new character on an old show". Crystal Bernard was then hired for the part. Edwards did not learn of the incident until many years later. In 1985, Edwards and Bernard wound up as co-stars on It's a Living, when the latter resumed production for first-run syndication.

Edwards also appeared in many movies-of-the-week during the 1980s, along with numerous other guest-star appearances in such series as Benson, Buffalo Bill, Doogie Howser, M.D., Knight Rider, Night Court and the premiere episode of Amazing Stories, directed by Steven Spielberg and original music/score by John Williams.

In 1990, Edwards was reunited with former Happy Days producers Thomas L. Miller and Robert L. Boyett, when she was cast as divorced mother Hilary Kozak on their single-season CBS sitcom The Family Man. Upon the series' cancellation in the summer of 1991, Edwards was asked by Miller and Boyett to join the cast of their hit ABC series Full House. They felt Edwards was right for the role of Vicky Larson, a talk show host who strikes up a relationship with Danny Tanner. Edwards made her Full House debut late that year, when the Vicky character first appeared as a substitute host for Rebecca Donaldson, who was on maternity leave, on (the fictional) Wake Up, San Francisco. Vicky and Danny soon embark on a long-term relationship and are engaged in the show's seventh season. Edwards's co-star on The Family Man, Scott Weinger, was transferred over to Full House along with her, playing Steve Hale, the high school boyfriend of D.J. Tanner.

During her tenure on Full House, Edwards also had the recurring guest role of Sharon LeMeure, the fast-talking mother of Six on NBC’s Blossom. Edwards's work on Blossom reunited her with former It's a Living producers Paul Junger Witt and Tony Thomas, who produced both series.

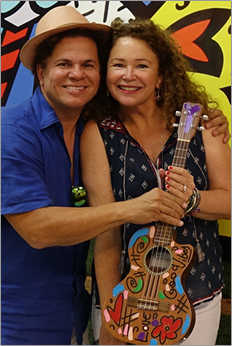
Romero Britto and Gail Edwards

Edwards concluded her roles in Full House (with Vicky Larson having a mutual breakup with Danny Tanner) and Blossom in the spring of 1994. She retired from show business at that time and moved to the Southwest.

In September 2017, it was announced that Edwards would return to acting by reprising her role as Vicky Larson in the third season of the Full House sequel series Fuller House. She appears in the Season 3 finale, "Here Comes the Sun". Edwards then made another appearance in the series finale, "Our Very Last Show, Again".

== Retirement ==
Edwards has supported and participated in several charities, including performing for the Veterans Administration, where she played ukulele that she learned just for this purpose. While in Miami, Edwards had an impromptu visit with Romero Britto who painted her ukulele, for which she thanked him in song via YouTube.

== Filmography ==
Television and film roles
Year	Title	Role	Notes
1977	Lou Grant	Karen	Episode: "Hooker"
1978	Taxi	Denise	Episode: "Men Are Such Beasts"
1978	Danny Thomas: Young & Foolish	Gail	TV movie
1979	Barnaby Jones	Karen Webster	Episode: "Girl on the Road"
1979	Starting Fresh	Gale	TV movie
1979	The Last Resort	Beverly	Episode: "Here Comes the Bride"
1979	Working Stiffs	Sandy	Episode: "Looking for Mr. Goodwrench"
1980	When the Whistle Blows	Jolene Jennings	Episode: "Love Is a Four-Letter Word"
1980	Blinded by the Light	Zora	TV movie
1980	Happy Days	Loretta	Episode: "A Potsie Is Born"
1980–82; 1985–89	It's a Living/ Making a Living	Dot Higgins	ABC/Lorimar-Telepictures/Warner Bros. Television Distribution
1980	Celebrity Family Feud	Herself	It's a Living vs. Dallas
1981	M*A*S*H	Marina Ryan	Episodes: Parts 1 & 2 "That's Show Biz"
1983	Buffalo Bill	Reporter	Episode: "The Interview"
1983	Get Crazy	Willy Loman	Movie
1983	Jennifer Slept Here	Pam Wilson	Episode: "The Tutor Who Came to Dinner"
1983	Knight Rider	Flannery Roe	Episode: "Nobody Does It Better"
1984	Benson	Jill	Episode: "Double Date"
1984	Brothers	Liza	Episode: "Liza"
1985	Three's a Crowd	Dorothy	Episode: "A Friend in Deed"
1985	Amazing Stories	Joleen	Episode: "Ghost Train"
1985	J.O.E. and the Colonel • Humanoid Defender	Dr. Lena Gant	TV movie
1986	Tough Cookies	Diane Taylor	Episode: "Ships in the Night"
1986	You Are the Jury	Maggie Henshaw	Episode: "The State of Arizona vs. Dr. Evan Blake"
1986	TV’s Bloopers & Practical Jokes	Herself	Guest host
1986	New Love, American Style	Lucy	Episode: "Love and the End"
1987	In Self Defense	Alice Miller	TV movie
1989	Night Court	Tracy Knight	Episode: "Attack of the Mac Snacks"
1989	Duet	Dr. Dellerton	Episode: "On the Nose"
1990	A Quiet Little Neighborhood, A Perfect Little Murder	Judy Lipton	TV movie
1990–91	The Family Man	Hilary Kozak	3 episodes
1991–93	Blossom	Sharon Lemure	10 episodes
1991–93	Full House	Vicky Larson	17 episodes
1992	Doogie Howser, M.D.	Mrs. Fukes	Episode: "The Big Sleep... Not!"
1994	Touched by an Angel	Barbara Archibald	Episode: "Manny"
2004	E! True Hollywood Story	Herself	Blossom interview
2017, 2020	Fuller House	Vicky Larson	Episodes: "Here Comes the Sun", "Our Very Last Show, Again"

=== TV commercials ===
Year	Product	Role	Notes
1976	Johnson's Baby Shampoo	Teenager	
1978	Bold Detergent	Mother	
1984	Dr. Pepper	Esmeralda	Clio Award
1984	Kodak	Pitchwoman	with David Copperfield
1986	Sizzler	Secretary	
1988	Canon Copiers	Executive	with Jack Klugman

== Theatre ==
Year	Title	Role	Notes
1963	The Women	Little Mary	Coconut Grove Playhouse
1973	Cabaret	Sally Bowles	Olympia Theater (Miami)
1975	Jacques Brel	Woman 1	Parker Playhouse
1975–76	Becoming	Woman 1	Miami / Off-Broadway
1977	Grease	Sandy	East Coast Tour
1979	Vanities	Joanne	Drama-Logue Critic's Award
1983	All About Eve	Eve	Directed by Dalton Cathey
1985	The Good One	Tura	Drama-Logue Critic's Award
1985	To Gillian on Her 37th Birthday	Kevin	West Coast Premiere
1996	Mame	Mame	Jerry Herman Ring Theatre (Christening)

== Awards and honors ==
- 2001: Inducted alongside Janet Reno and Al Del Greco in the Coral Gables High School Hall of Fame.

== Points of interest ==
- 1974: Opened for Frank Sinatra at the Fontainebleau Miami Beach on March 24, benefiting Danny Thomas’ St. Jude Children's Research Hospital
- 1976: Backup vocalist for Sergio Franchi's U.S. tour
- 1978: Upon moving to Los Angeles, Edwards lived with former MGM contract star, Gloria DeHaven
- Being offered a role without the grueling audition process is the height of tribute in Hollywood. Seven such roles: Anson Williams (A Perfect Little Murder), Steven Spielberg (Amazing Stories), Gary David Goldberg (Family Ties), Don Reo (Blossom), Martha Williamson (Touched by an Angel), Jerry Herman (Mame) and (Fuller House) Jeff Franklin.

== See also ==
- List of people from Miami
