= Richard Burton's Hamlet =

1964 film by John Gielgud

Richard Burton's Hamlet is a common name for both the Broadway production of William Shakespeare's tragedy that played from April 9 to August 8, 1964 at the Lunt-Fontanne Theatre, and for the filmed record of it that has been released theatrically and on home video.

== Theatre ==
=== Background ===
The production took place because of a lighthearted agreement between Richard Burton and Peter O'Toole while they were filming Becket. O'Toole decreed that they should each play Hamlet afterwards under the direction of John Gielgud and Laurence Olivier in either London or New York City, with a coin toss deciding who would be assigned which director and which city. O'Toole won London and Olivier in the toss, with Burton being assigned Gielgud and New York. O'Toole kept his part of the agreement, appearing as Hamlet under Olivier's direction in the premiere production of the Royal National Theatre later that year, and Burton approached producer Alexander H. Cohen and Gielgud about mounting a New York production.

=== Concept ===
Because Burton disliked wearing period costumes, and for aesthetic reasons of his own, Gielgud conceived of a production performed in a “rehearsal” setting with an incomplete set and the actors wearing what appeared to be street clothes (although the costumes were actually the result of continuous trial-and-error in rehearsals, with the actors bringing in countless variations of attire for Gielgud to consider). Gielgud also opted to depict the Ghost as a shadow against the back of the stage wall, voicing the character himself on tape (since he was unavailable while the production was in performance).

=== Reception ===
The production was a financial smash, achieving the longest run for the play in Broadway history at 137 performances, which broke the previous record set by Maurice Evans's GI Hamlet in the 1940s. The run's popularity was due in no small part to attention Burton received for his romance with Elizabeth Taylor, whom he married while the production was in Toronto pre-Broadway; crowds gathered outside the New York theater to get a glimpse of Burton, and sometimes Taylor, after the show. Burton's reviews in the title role were largely favorable and he received a Tony Award nomination for his performance, and Hume Cronyn's performance as Polonius won him the Tony Award for Best Performance by a Featured Actor in a Play. Eileen Herlie, who played Queen Gertrude, had already played the role in Laurence Olivier's Oscar-winning 1948 film version. Less favorably received were Linda Marsh as Ophelia and Alfred Drake as King Claudius, whom Gielgud had considered replacing with respectively Sarah Miles and either Harry Andrews or himself in rehearsals.

Interest in the production inspired books by cast members William Redfield and Richard L. Sterne. Sterne went to the length of hiding a tape recorder in a briefcase at rehearsals to get accurate transcriptions of what was said. Sterne hid, under a part of the set, for six hours, to record Gielgud and Burton in their private meeting the day before the first performance.

== Film ==
Richard Burton's Hamlet
- Directed by: Bill Colleran (film); John Gielgud (stage)
- Written by: William Shakespeare
- Produced by: Alexander Cohen; Alfred W. Crown; John Heyman
- Starring: Richard Burton; Hume Cronyn; Eileen Herlie; Alfred Drake
- Cinematography: Nobby Cross
- Distributed by: Theatrofilm
- Release date: 23 September 1964
- Running time: 191 minutes
- Country: United States
- Language: English
- Box office: $3,100,000 (US/ Canada)

A filmed record was created by recording three live performances on camera from June 30 to July 1 using a process called Electronovision and then editing them into a single film.

=== Theatrical release ===
This film was produced by Horace William Sargent Jr. (as Bill Sargent—often incorrectly attributed as William Sargent Jr.), who was also the creator and patent holder of Electronovision, and whose credits include T.A.M.I. Show, Richard Pryor: Live in Concert, and Give 'em Hell, Harry!. Hamlet played for only two days in theatres to lukewarm reviews. William Redfield wrote that “the film version played four performances in a thousand theatres and has grossed (to date) a total of $4,000,000. The financial details of this venture involved a mass screwing of the acting company so excruciatingly delicious that only a separate letter could do the tale justice.”

==== 1995 re-release ====
Upon discovering the lost copy of the film, Paul Brownstein had it restored and shown in theaters in May–June 1995 at the Lunt-Fontanne Theatre.

=== Online release ===
Alternative Entertainment Network (aentv.com) publicly streamed a copy of the film in real-time in April, 1997, making it among the first movies to be streamed on the Internet.

=== Home media ===
By contractual agreement, all prints of the film were to have been destroyed after its theatrical run. However, a single print was discovered in Burton's garage following his death, and his widow allowed it to be distributed on VHS, and later on DVD. The film was originally titled Hamlet, but the VHS and DVD covers read Richard Burton's Hamlet.

== Columbia Masterworks LP album set ==
A four-record Columbia Masterworks LP album set of the production was made in 1964, with its original cast. However, the recording was not made directly from the soundtrack of the film. The production's cast recorded it in the recording studio, and the album was released in both mono and stereo, but has so far not appeared on compact disc. The film, by contrast, was released only in mono sound. The album set was nominated for the Best Documentary, Spoken Word or Drama Recording (other than comedy) Grammy award.

== Cast ==
- Richard Burton as Hamlet
- Hume Cronyn as Polonius
- Alfred Drake as Claudius
- Eileen Herlie as Gertrude
- William Redfield as Guildenstern
- George Rose as First Gravedigger
- George Voskovec as Player King
- Philip Coolidge as Voltemand
- John Cullum as Laertes
- Michael Ebert as Francisco/ Fortinbras
- Dillon Evans as Reynaldo/Osric
- Clement Fowler as Rosencrantz
- Geoff Garland as Lucianus
- Barnard Hughes as Marcellus/Priest
- Linda Marsh as Ophelia
- Robert Milli as Horatio
- Hugh Alexander as Cornelius/ Second Gravedigger/ English Ambassador
- Robert Burr as Bernardo/Ensemble
- Christopher Culkin as Player Queen
- Alex Giannini as Ensemble
- John Gielgud as Ghost
- Claude Harz as Ensemble
- John Hetherington as Player Prologue/Ensemble
- Gerome Ragni as Ensemble
- Linda Seff as Ensemble
- Richard L. Sterne as Gentleman
- Carol Teitel as Ensemble
- Frederick Young as Ensemble
