= Jerry Herman Ring Theatre =

Coordinates: 25°43′10.68″N 80°16′48.38″W

The Jerry Herman Ring Theatre is the student theatre at the University of Miami in Coral Gables, Florida.

== History ==
The theatre was founded in 1946 with the current building's construction completed in 1953. The theatre is notable for having given birth to the acting careers of Steven Bauer, Ray Liotta, Sylvester Stallone, and other University of Miami alumni. It is named in honor of 1953 University of Miami alumnus Jerry Herman, whose Broadway career included composing Hello, Dolly!, Mame, La Cage aux Folles, and other Broadway hits.

Since its founding, the Ring has performed at three different sites. In addition to its current location, the Ring has been located previously in a circus tent and a round building used to train Allied navigators during World War II.

The name for the Ring grew out of the company's first in-the-round performance, which placed the audience in a "ring" around the stage. The current building was designed by Robert M. Little and Marion M. Manley and constructed started in 1951 with completion in 1953. Its unusual circular design and first-of-its-kind, flexible seating arrangement drew national attention in the world of theater. The main building has a roof constructed of poured concrete that is held in place by a large 3 inch wide steel ban like the ban placed old wagon wheels in the 1800s and heated then shrunk. The Ring Theater was designed and built to withstand hurricanes with winds up to 250-mph.

In the 1970s, the Ring permanently changed its seating configuration to three-sided thrust. After a complete renovation of the theatre house, the Ring has now returned to total flexibility and offer three different kinds of staging as well as three seating arrangements.

The theatre is named for University of Miami alumnus and Broadway composer Jerry Herman. Its new stage, the Alvin Sherman Family Stage, is named in honor of philanthropist Alvin Sherman, who provided support for the theatre's renovation.

The Ring Theatre is served by the Miami Metrorail at the University Station.

== Notable alumni ==
- Steven Bauer - actor, "Manolo Ray" in Scarface
- Jeff Coopwood - actor, voice of "The Borg" in Star Trek: First Contact
- Gail Edwards - actress, "Vicky Larson" in Full House
- Joshua Henry - actor, "Haywood Patterson" in The Scottsboro Boys
- Dawnn Lewis - actress, "Jaleesa Vinson-Taylor" on A Different World
- Ray Liotta - actor, "Henry Hill" in Goodfellas
- Ernie Sabella - actor, "Mr. Petrachelli" on That's So Raven
- Saundra Santiago - actress, "Det. Gina Navarro Calabrese" in Miami Vice
- Sylvester Stallone - actor, Rocky and Rambo
