= Stu Silver =

American screenwriter and television writer (1947–2023)

- Born: Stewart Norton Silver; June 29, 1947; Los Angeles, California, U.S.
- Died: July 18, 2023 (aged 76); Rochester, New York, U.S.
- Occupation(s): Screenwriter, television writer

Stewart Norton Silver (June 29, 1947 – July 18, 2023) was an American screenwriter and television writer best known for such films and television series as Throw Momma from the Train, Webster, It's a Living, Bosom Buddies and Soap. Silver also wrote the first half of Good Morning, Vietnam.

Silver died from complications of prostate cancer in Rochester, New York, on July 18, 2023, at the age of 76.
