= Paul Brownstein =

American television director

Paul Brownstein is a director, writer, stage manager, and executive producer, working in the fields of television, music, recording, radio, concert touring, and home video. Brownstein’s company owns worldwide TV and digital distribution rights to more than 4,000 hours of classic TV comedy and variety series and specials, for clients like The Dick Van Dyke Show, Cher, Don Rickles, and The Robin Williams Trust. Brownstein lives in Los Angeles, California.

== Executive producer ==
Brownstein was executive Producer with Carl Reiner and George Shapiro for three annual CBS specials featuring colorized episodes of The Dick Van Dyke Show, entitled The Dick Van Dyke Show: Now in Living Color. Paul Brownstein Productions distributes the original series.

A DVD producer, his most recent release is Robin Williams: Comic Genius, a 22 disc DVD set for Time-Life.

As an executive producer for CBS Home Entertainment, he created special features for the 50th Anniversary of Gunsmoke, The Phil Silvers Show, and Perry Mason, the 40th Anniversary of The Wild Wild West and Hogan's Heroes, and full season DVDs of The Odd Couple, The Beverly Hillbillies, Gomer Pyle, U.S.M.C., and The Twilight Zone.

For public television, he was an executive producer for 19 seasons of the My Music series of Pledge break specials with the original artists of Doo-wop, Soul, Disco, Folk, and the popular music hits of legendary artists like Johnny Mathis and Dionne Warwick.

Brownstein was an executive producer of VH1’s The Best of American Bandstand. He also produced the highly rated VH1 Archives series of episodes from the Mike Douglas, David Frost, and Dick Cavett talk shows with artists like John Lennon, David Bowie, and James Brown.

Brownstein was executive producer with Jeff Margolis for The Honeymooners 50th Anniversary Celebration, and appeared as a guest on Larry King Live. Brownstein also supervised the digital remastering of the "Classic 39" Honeymooners episodes for CBS. Other TV credits include executive producer of VH1 Goes Inside the American Music Awards, and consulting producer on CBS…50 Years From Television City.

== TV's supersleuth ==
Variety once called him "TV’s supersleuth", for his unique role as "Raider of the Lost Archives". For all of his DVDs, Brownstein has digitally remastered the original negatives and master tapes and tracked down never before seen outtakes, promos, behind the scenes footage, and rare clips from other programs as DVD bonus footage, plus recording audio commentary.

As executive producer for the revival of the original Smothers Brothers Comedy Hour, he restored segments deleted by CBS censors from that TV series, which enjoyed renewed success when it found a new generation of fans on the E! television channel.

Brownstein also saw an eight-year project come to fruition in 1995 with the completion of a fully remastered Richard Burton's Hamlet—a filmed record of the 1963 Broadway stage, production, acknowledged as the high point of the actor’s theatrical career. After Brownstein's discovery of the original 35mm negative, negotiations of the production rights and digital remastering, the restored film premiered at the British Film Institute in London as the final event in its yearlong festival of Shakespeare On Film. The Burton Hamlet is now available on DVD and was the subject of a new play at The Public Theater in New York in 2008.

== Awards ==
He won the DVD Exclusive Award for Best Overall TV DVD as well as the TV on DVD Award for 2004 as producer of The Dick Van Dyke Show DVD, and also won multiple DVD awards for Get Smart. Brownstein’s other DVD releases include Here's Lucy, The Richard Pryor Show, and The Sonny & Cher Comedy Hour.
