= Paul Kreppel =

American actor and director

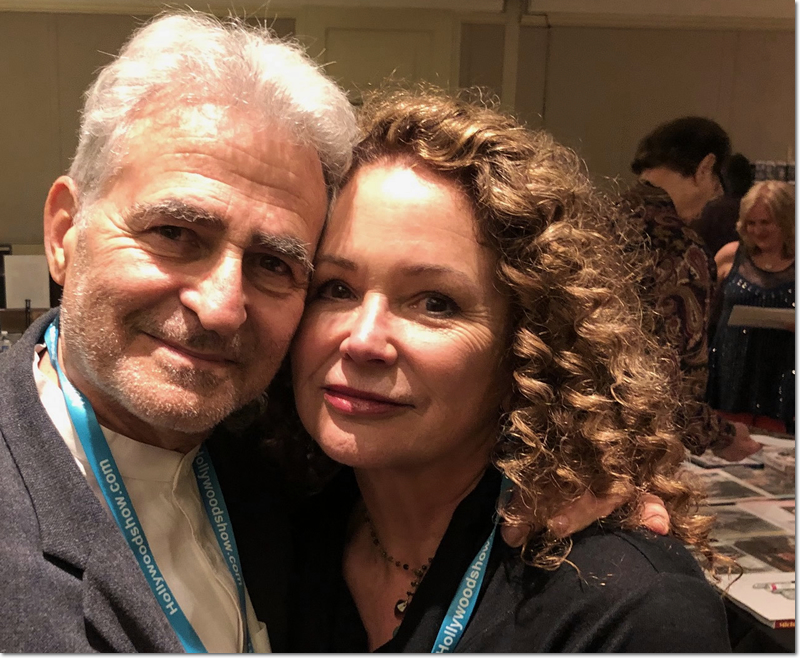
- Kreppel (left) with Gail Edwards in The Hollywood Show, 2019
- Born: June 20, 1947 (age 79); Kingston, New York, U.S.
- Occupations: Actor, director
- Years active: 1980–present
- Website: paulkreppel.com

Paul Kreppel (born June 20, 1947) is an American actor and director. On television, he was best known as pianist Sonny Mann on the show It's a Living. In his work as theater director-producer-creator, he received the 2007 Tony Award for Jay Johnson: The Two and Only.

== Early life ==
Kreppel was born in Kingston, New York, to Adele and Irv Kreppel. He later moved to Boston to attend Emerson College.

== Career ==
Kreppel started his acting career by starring in the improvisational theater group, "The Proposition," which included Jane Curtin, Josh Mostel, Judith Kahan, and Munson Hicks. When the group moved to New York, Kreppel began starring in off-Broadway plays, including Godspell and Tuscaloosa's Calling Me...

While appearing at the New York Shakespeare Festival, he notably starred with Meryl Streep in the musical, Alice in Concert, by Elizabeth Swados. Kreppel also performed in Agamemnon (as part of chorus) and The Comedy of Errors in the late 1970s.

=== Television and other work ===
In 1979, Kreppel moved to Los Angeles to become the memorable waitress-harassing pianist, Sonny Mann, of It's a Living. He starred in all 120 episodes, and also directed some episodes. Kreppel, along with Gail Edwards, the late Marian Mercer, and the late Barrie Youngfellow, were the only four who lasted through the show's network and syndicated runs.

He was a semi-regular celebrity guest on the 1980s versions of the game show Pyramid, and also made celebrity appearances on Hollywood Squares, Win, Lose or Draw, Body Language, Blackout, and The New Liar's Club.

During the 1990s, he returned to theatre and starred in the musical revue of the Allan Sherman song, "Hello Muddah, Hello Fadduh!" In addition, he starred in Jerome Robbins' Broadway on its national tour.

Kreppel was the voice of Apollo Blue in Jetsons: The Movie, and guest-starred in and directed other television shows, including appearing as Jackie's dad in That '70s Show. He appeared off Broadway for more than a year in the one-man show My Mother's Italian, My Father's Jewish and I'm in Therapy.

=== Community work ===
Kreppel has served on the Council of Actors' Equity Association and as a board member of the Screen Actors Guild. He is active in arts education as a professional arts educator for LA's Reprise, and as the vice president and one of the three member Executive Leadership Team of Enrichment Works, a not-for-profit that provides curriculum-based theatre for schools in Southern California. Paul has also created and co-created benefits for The Entertainment Community Fund(formerly The Actors Fund) and Orphaned Starfish Foundation.

=== Recent projects ===
Among other projects, Kreppel directed and produced with his partner in WetRock Entertainment, Ms. Murphy Cross, Jay Johnson: The Two and Only, for which he won a 2007 Tony Award for Best Special Theatrical Event.

Kreppel played the [wondereul [Wizard (character)|Wizard of Oz]] during the second national tour of the musical Wicked, from March 7, 2012, to March 10, 2013.

He appeared in the RuPaul 2021 television movie The Bitch Who Stole Christmas.

In June 2022, Kreppel joined the cast of the Broadway revival of Into the Woods, understudying the Narrator/Mysterious Man and the Steward. He reprised these roles in the 2023 national tour.

== Personal life ==
Kreppel is divorced with two children. His children, Will and Molly, are both artists.

In 1992, Kreppel received an Alumni Achievement Award from Emerson College, for outstanding achievements in his field.

== Filmography ==
Television
Year	Title	Role	Notes
2000	L.A. 7	Mr. Walters	3 episodes
1999	Suddenly Susan	Darryl	episodes: "One Man's Intervention Is Another Man's Tupperware Party"
1998	That '70s Show	Mr. Burkhart	3 episodes
1998	Step by Step	Stan	episode: "Phoney Business"
1997	ER	Mr. Cotmeier	episode: "Freak Show"
1997	Cybill	Glen	episode: "The Wedding"
1996	California Dreams	Marty Stinson	episode: "Babewatch"
1990–1993	Tom & Jerry Kids Show	Beauregard (voice)	episode: "Sugar Belle Loves Tom, Sometimes"
1992	Clarissa Explains It All	Joey Russo	episode: "Janet's Old Boyfriend"
1990	My Two Dads	Schuyler Dunne	episode: "When You Wish..."
1990	Open House	Waiter	episode: "The Real Estate Thing"
1990	Murder, She Wrote	Leo Kaplan	episode: "Murder: According to Maggie"
1990	Doogie Howser, M.D.	Mark Murson	episode: "Greed Is Good"
1990	Barnyard Commandos	Voice	
1990	Timeless Tales from Hallmark	Voice	episode: "The Emperor's New Clothes"
1980–1989	It's a Living	Sonny Mann	Main Cast
1984	Night Court	Guy Harris	episode: "Welcome Back, Momma"
1983	Remington Steele	Stan	episode: "Scene Steelers"
1983	The Love Boat	Russ Butler	episode: "Rhino of the Year/One Last Time/For Love or Money"
1983	Fantasy Island	Don Mitchel	episode: "Love Island/The Sisters"
1982	It Takes Two	Janitor	episode: "Turnabout"
1980	Laverne & Shirley	Rafael	episode: "The Beatnik Show"

Film
Year	Title	Role	Notes
2013	Straight Outta Tompkins	Paul Kreppel	
1990	Jetsons: The Movie	Apollo Blue	voice
1983	13 Thirteenth Avenue	Roland Keats	TV movie
1980	The Scarlett O'Hara War	Delivery Man	TV movie

== Stage credits ==
Theatre
Year	Title	Role	Notes
1972 - 74	Godspell	Herb	
1972 - 74	Godspell	Judas	
1976-77	Joseph and the Amazing Technicolor Dreamcoat	Levi	Brooklyn Academy of Music
1977	Agamemnon	Chorus	Broadway
1977	Joseph and the Amazing Technicolor Dreamcoat	Levi	Brooklyn Academy of Music
1981-82	Godspell	Light of the World	
1990-91	Jerome Robbins' Broadway	The Setter	Tour
1992-93	Hello Muddah, Hello Fadduh! The Allan Sherman Musical	Man 3	Regional
2005	Tough Titty	Ensemble/Dr. Pearlman	Regional
2008	Silk Stockings	Comrade Brankov	Regional
2010	Chicago	Amos Hart	Regional
2012-13	Wicked	The Wonderful Wizard of Oz	2nd National Tour
2019	Enter Laughing: The Musical	Mr. Foreman	Regional
2019	Indecent	Otto/The Elder	Regional
2022-23	Into the Woods	Narrator / Mysterious Man (Standby) Steward (Understudy)	Broadway
2022-23	Into the Woods	Narrator / Mysterious Man (Standby) Steward (Understudy)	National Tour
2024	Once Upon a Mattress	Ensemble	Off-Broadway

2026 ((Tuesdays With Morrie))) Morrie Florida Rep
