= It's a Living =

American sitcom (1980–1989)

- Also known as: Making a Living
- Created by: Stu Silver; Dick Clair; Jenna McMahon
- Starring: Barrie Youngfellow; Ann Jillian; Sheryl Lee Ralph; Gail Edwards; Crystal Bernard; Paul Kreppel; Louise Lasser; Earl Boen; Marian Mercer; Wendy Schaal; Susan Sullivan; Richard Stahl; Bert Remsen
- Theme music composer: George Tipton; Leslie Bricusse
- Opening theme: "It's a Living"
- Country of origin: United States
- No. of seasons: 6
- No. of episodes: 120 (list of episodes)

Production
- Executive producers: Paul Junger Witt; Tony Thomas
- Producers: Joel Zwick; R.J. Colleary; Marc Sotkin; Tom Whedon; Gloria Banta; Greg Antonacci; Paul Kreppel
- Camera setup: Multi-camera
- Running time: 30 minutes
- Production company: Witt/Thomas Productions

Original release
- Network: ABC
- Release: October 30, 1980 – June 11, 1982
- Network: Syndication
- Release: September 28, 1985 – April 8, 1989

It's a Living (renamed Making a Living for season 2) is an American ensemble sitcom television series set in a restaurant at the top of the Bonaventure Hotel in Los Angeles. The show aired on ABC from October 30, 1980, until June 11, 1982. After the series was canceled by ABC, new episodes aired in first-run syndication from September 28, 1985, to April 8, 1989. The series was created by Stu Silver, Dick Clair and Jenna McMahon and produced by Witt/Thomas Productions, with distribution rights held by Golden West Television (1985–86) and Lorimar-Telepictures (1986–89). The series is now distributed by Paul Brownstein Productions.

Season 1 cast

== Plot ==
The show follows the lives of the waitresses at the posh, fictional restaurant called Above the Top, located atop the Bonaventure Hotel in Los Angeles, California. At the helm is supervisor Nancy Beebe, the restaurant's maître d’, who sometimes fraternizes with the girls but usually gives orders and demands excellence. The plot often involves the harried waitresses annoying Nancy in some minor way. Adding to the elegant but chaotic working environment is wisecracking pianist Sonny Mann, who makes rude and occasionally sexist comments to the waitresses and receives insults in return. The kitchen is first the domain of Chef Mario, then Dennis Hubner and finally Howard Miller. Howard and Nancy eventually fall in love and marry.

== Cast ==
Actor	Character	Seasons					
Actor	Character	1 (1980–81)	2 (1981–82)	3 (1985–86)	4 (1986–87)	5 (1987–88)	6 (1988–89)
Barrie Youngfellow	Jan Hoffmeyer Gray						
Gail Edwards	Dorothy "Dot" Higgins						
Marian Mercer	Nancy Beebe Miller						
Paul Kreppel	Sonny Mann						
Ann Jillian	Cassie Cranston						
Susan Sullivan	Lois Adams						
Wendy Schaal	Vicki Allen						
Bert Remsen	Mario						
Louise Lasser	Maggie McBurney						
Earl Boen	Dennis Hubner						
Crystal Bernard	Amy Tompkins						
Richard Stahl	Howard Miller						
Sheryl Lee Ralph	Ginger St. James						

Richard Kline also appears as recurring character Richie Gray, Jan's new husband, in seasons 3 through 6.

== Episodes ==
The show's two broadcast seasons produced 27 episodes. An additional 93 episodes were produced for the syndication run, making a total of 120 episodes.

Season	Title	Episodes	Originally released		
Season	Title	Episodes	First released	Last released	Network
1	It's a Living	13	October 30, 1980	August 4, 1981	ABC
2	Making a Living	14	October 24, 1981	June 11, 1982	ABC
3	It's a Living	22	September 28, 1985	May 24, 1986	Syndication
4	It's a Living	25	September 27, 1986	May 23, 1987	Syndication
5	It's a Living	26	September 26, 1987	May 28, 1988	Syndication
6	It's a Living	20	October 15, 1988	April 8, 1989	Syndication

== Title changes ==
As with many other sitcoms from the 1980–81 television season, It's a Living felt the effects of the 1980 Screen Actors Guild and American Federation of Television and Radio Artists strike, which limited the show to just 13 episodes in its first season.

The series was not a ratings success. For Season 2, the cast was largely retooled and the series was renamed Making a Living. Two of the five waitresses from the first season—Lois Adams and Vicki Allen, played by actresses Susan Sullivan and Wendy Schaal, respectively—were removed, and waitress Maggie McBurney, portrayed by Louise Lasser, was added. However, this iteration also failed to find success, and the show was canceled at the end of the season. In syndication, the second season airs under the original title of It's a Living.

Of all the cast members, only Gail Edwards (Dot Higgins), Marian Mercer (Nancy Beebe Miller), Barrie Youngfellow (Jan Hoffmeyer Gray) and Paul Kreppel (Sonny Mann) lasted through the show's network and syndicated runs. Ann Jillian (Cassie Cranston) appeared during the network run and the first year of syndication. Crystal Bernard and Richard Stahl appeared during the entire syndicated run.

== Syndication ==
While the show was never a hit on network television, its fortunes would later turn in 1983 when all 27 episodes entered syndication. The series began to attract a following along with surprising ratings for the reruns, which prompted the producers and Golden West Television to revive it. Another factor in its sudden rediscovery was Ann Jillian's 1984 public disclosure that she had been diagnosed with breast cancer.

In 1985, the show was revived under its old name for the syndicated market. Most of the cast remained intact from the former version. A new waitress, Amy Tompkins (Crystal Bernard), arrived at the restaurant and was immediately accepted by the group. Jillian, who had committed to just one season in syndication, left the show in 1986 to continue her cancer treatments. Her character was explained to have married and started a family. She was replaced by Ginger St. James (Sheryl Lee Ralph). With these core cast members in place, the show continued to produce episodes for syndication until it ended in 1989.

From 2000 to 2001, TV Land aired the series occasionally for special programming blocks. In April 2018, Logo TV began to carry the series in marathon form several times a month. Antenna TV ran the series from January 2, 2020 to August 30, 2021, and it later ran on Rewind TV.

It is also available for streaming online on FilmRise and its partner streaming services Pluto TV, the Roku Channel, Tubi and Amazon Prime Video, under license from the show's current distributor, Paul Brownstein Productions.

== Broadcast ==
A partial list of stations the show was syndicated to during its revival in syndication:

City	Station
Atlanta	WXIA 11
Austin	KBVO 42
Baltimore	WBFF 45
Bloomington	WYZZ 43
Boston	WSBK 38
Buffalo	WUTV 29
Charlotte	WSOC 9
Chicago	WFLD 32
Cincinnati	WCPO 9
Cleveland	WUAB 43
Dallas/Ft. Worth	KTVT 11
Denver	KTVD 20
Detroit	WXON 20
Green Bay	WGBA 26
Greensboro	WNRW 45
Greenville/Spartanburg/Asheville	WLOS 13
Greenwood/Greenville	WABG 6
Hartford	WTXX 20
Houston	KHTV 39
Indianapolis	WTTV 4
Jackson	WJTV 12
Kansas City	KZKC 62
Los Angeles	KCOP 13
Manchester	WMUR 9
Memphis	WMC 5
Miami/Ft. Lauderdale	WBFS 33
Milwaukee	WCGV 24
Minneapolis/St. Paul	KMSP 9
Mobile	WPMI 15
Nashville	WZTV 17
New York City	WOR-TV 9
Norfolk/Suffolk	WVEC 13
Orlando	WOFL 35
Philadelphia	WPHL 17
Phoenix	KPHO 5
Pittsburgh	WPGH 53
Portland, Maine	WPXT 51
Raleigh/Durham/Fayetteville	WLFL 22
Roanoke/Lynchburg	WSET 13
Sacramento	KTXL 40
San Antonio	KSAT 12
San Francisco	KBHK-TV 44
Seattle/Tacoma	KCPQ 13
Shreveport	KTBS 3
Spokane	KSKN 22
St. Louis	KPLR 11
Tampa Bay	WFTS 28
Washington, D.C.	WDCA 20
Wilmington	WSFX 26

== International broadcast ==
In Italy, the show aired on Rai Uno (Rai 1) under the name Nancy, Sonny & Co. in 1988. It was also known as Roof Garden. In Japan, it was broadcast in 1984 on TV Tokyo under the title Restaurant Uproar and ran for two seasons.
