= Jean Speegle Howard =

American actress (1927–2000)

- Born: Jean Frances Speegle; January 31, 1927; Duncan, Oklahoma, U.S.
- Died: September 2, 2000 (aged 73); Los Angeles, California, U.S.
- Burial place: Hollywood Forever Cemetery
- Other name: Jean Howard
- Occupation: Actress
- Years active: 1956–2000
- Spouse: Rance Howard (m. 1949)
- Children: Ron Howard; Clint Howard
- Relatives: Bryce Dallas Howard (granddaughter); Paige Howard (granddaughter)

External image
- Howard as Blanch Lovell in Apollo 13 in 1995.

Jean Frances Howard (née Speegle; January 31, 1927 – September 2, 2000) was an American actress who acted primarily in film and on television. She appeared in over 30 television shows, mostly sitcoms, such as Married... with Children (1994–1996), but she also had guest spots on such series as Grace Under Fire and Buffy the Vampire Slayer beginning from 1975 (mostly during the 1980s and 1990s) until her death. She was best known for her roles as Blanche Lovell, Jim Lovell's mother, in Apollo 13, Mrs. Phelps in Matilda and Mrs. Baker in Two of a Kind.

== Early life ==
Howard was born Jean Frances Speegle in Duncan, Oklahoma, the daughter of Louise (née Dewey) and William Allen Speegle.

== Career ==
Although she was an actress in film and television early on, her son Ron Howard said she largely put her career aside to raise her sons, Ron, born in 1954, and Clint, born in 1959. She appeared in the 1956 film Frontier Woman alongside husband Rance Howard and their son Ron Howard, aged two years at the time. In 1975, the entire family would act in the television film Huckleberry Finn. Howard appeared in a bit part in the 1985 film Cocoon. In the 1986 Christmas film A Smoky Mountain Christmas, Howard played Old Lady Jezebel alongside her husband, who played Dr. Jennings.

Howard worked regularly as a television guest star and in films in the 1990s appearing in popular series such as Married... with Children, Grace Under Fire, Buffy the Vampire Slayer, Lois & Clark: The New Adventures of Superman, The Wonder Years, and Roseanne. She acted in the 1994 film The Paper, the 1996 film Matilda as the librarian, Mrs. Phelps, and the 1998 tv series Two of a Kind as the elderly next door neighbor, Mrs. Baker.

In one of her last on-camera speaking roles, Howard portrayed astronaut Jim Lovell's mother in the 1995 motion picture Apollo 13. When circumstances appear bleak for the crew, Howard's character says confidently, "If they could get a washing machine to fly, my Jimmy could land it." Her son and director of the film Ron Howard said, "It was a great moment."

== Personal life ==
She married actor Rance Howard, also from Duncan, Oklahoma, in 1949. Their sons are actor and filmmaker Ron Howard and actor Clint Howard. Among her grandchildren are actresses Bryce Dallas Howard and Paige Howard.

== Death ==
On September 2, 2000, Howard died in Los Angeles, California of heart and respiratory illness. She was 73 years old. She is buried in Hollywood Forever Cemetery, next to her husband who died in 2017.

The 2000 film How the Grinch Stole Christmas, directed by her son Ron, includes a dedication to her at the beginning of the end credits, saying that she "loved Christmas the most." The film includes performances by her son Clint (as Whobris), her husband Rance (as the Elderly Timekeeper) and her granddaughter Bryce (as the Surprised Who).

== Filmography ==
=== Film ===
Year	Title	Role	Notes
1956	Frontier Woman	Villager Woman (Uncredited)	
1969	Old Paint (short)	Mother	
1975	Huckleberry Finn	Widow Douglas	
1985	Cocoon	Woman	
1986	Gung Ho	Lady in Market	
1988	Scrooged	Mrs Claus	
1992	I Don't Buy Kisses Anymore	Elderly Woman	
1994	The Paper	Hospital Volunteer	
1995	Apollo 13	Blanche Lovell	
1996	Black Sheep	Elderly Woman	
1996	Where Truth Lies	Mrs. Gloria Smith	
1996	Matilda	Mrs. Phelps	
1996	My Fellow Americans	Asthmatic Woman on Tour	
1997	Traveller	Bokky's Grandmother	
1997	Los Locos	Mother Superior	
1997	Sparkle and Charm	Patricia	
1998	Spoiler	Jillian / Jennifer	
1998	Hundred Percent		
1998	The Night Caller	Olivia	
2000	The Hiding Place	Sally	Filmed in 1998; final film role

=== Television ===
Year	Title	Role	Notes
1993-1996	Lois & Clark: The New Adventures of Superman	Bertha Emory / Elderly spectator	2 episodes
1993	The Wonder Years	Jane Gustafson	Episode: "Reunion"
1995	Roseanne	Elderly Nudist Neighbor	Episode: "Rear Window"
1997	Beyond Belief: Fact or Fiction	Melanie Hannon	Episode: "The Viewing"
1997	Buffy the Vampire Slayer	Real Natalie French	Episode: "Teacher's Pet"
1997-1998	Fired Up	Mrs. Morton	3 episodes
1998-1999	Two of a Kind	Mrs. Edna Baker	2 episodes
