= Clint Howard =

American actor (born 1959)

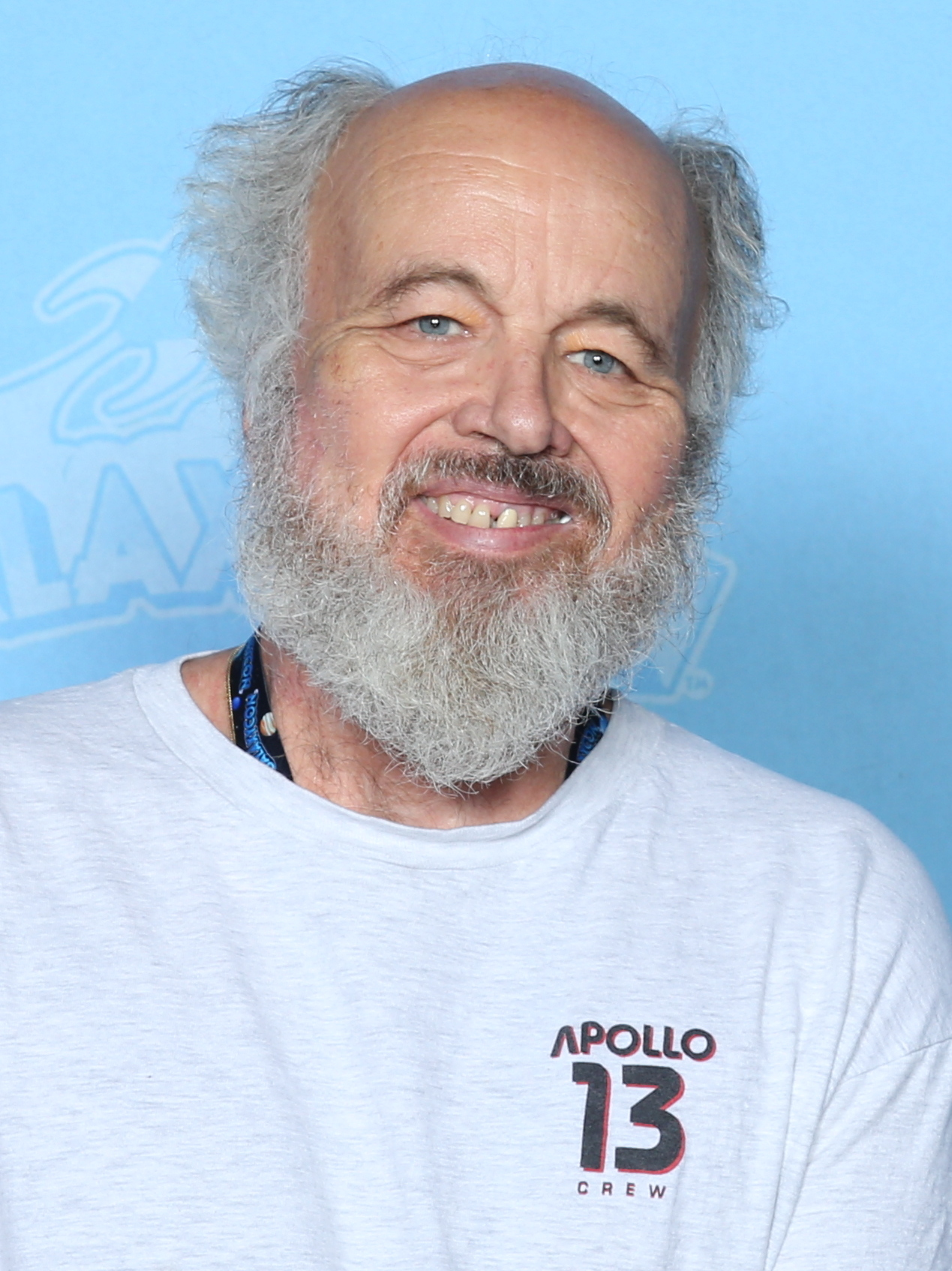
- Howard at GalaxyCon Richmond in 2022
- Born: Clinton Engle Howard; April 20, 1959 (age 67); Burbank, California, U.S.
- Occupation: Actor
- Years active: 1962–present
- Spouses: Ann Marie Lynch (m. 1988; div. 1989) Melanie Sorich (m. 1995; div. 2017) Katherine Cruz (m. 2020)
- Children: 1
- Parents: Rance Howard; Jean Speegle Howard
- Relatives: Ron Howard (brother); Bryce Dallas Howard (niece); Paige Howard (niece)

Clinton Engle Howard (born April 20, 1959) is an American actor. He is the second son born to American actors Rance Howard and Jean Speegle Howard, and younger brother of actor and director Ron Howard. His more than 200 acting credits include the lead role in the feature film and television series Gentle Ben, main-cast roles in series The Baileys of Balboa and The Cowboys, supporting roles in feature films such as The Waterboy and Apollo 13, guest appearances in the series My Name Is Earl, and several roles in the Star Trek franchise. He has appeared in many films directed by his brother.

== Early life ==
Born in Burbank, California, on April 20, 1959, Clint's parents were actors Rance Howard and Jean Speegle, and his older brother is actor and filmmaker Ron Howard. Clint Howard explained that his parents were introduced to each other in 1947 at the University of Oklahoma by Dennis Weaver.

== Career ==
=== Television ===
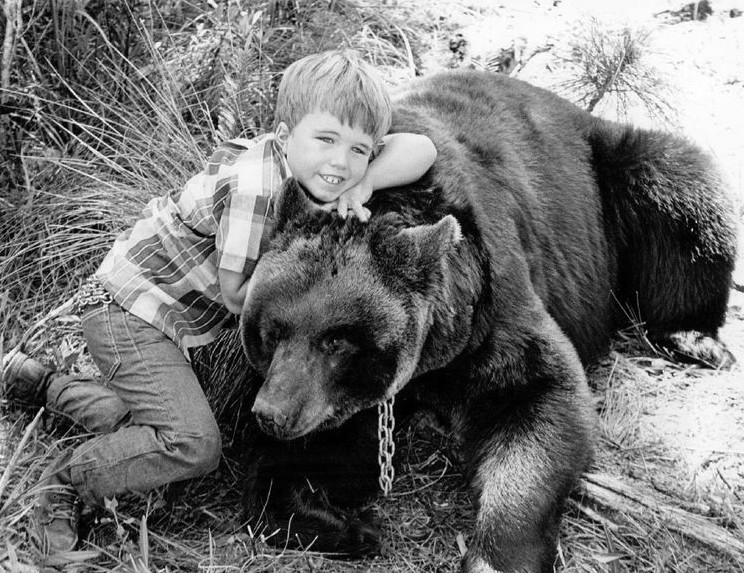
Clint in Gentle Ben (1967)

Howard began his career when he was two, appearing in five episodes of The Andy Griffith Show, then starring his older brother Ron. He played Leon, a toddler in a cowboy outfit who wandered around Mayberry and silently offered people a bite of his sandwich, to which they would respond, "No thanks, Leon". Other early notable roles include his appearance on The Virginian as Tommy, the proud owner of a new litter of pups in the episode entitled "Melanie".

In 1963, Howard appeared in the ABC medical drama Breaking Point in the role of four-year-old Mikey in the episode "The Gnu, Now Almost Extinct". He also played little Billy Taft, the nephew of Dr. Richard Kimble, in the season one episode of The Fugitive, "Home is the Hunted" (1964).

Howard's first prominent role was as a regular on the series Gentle Ben (1967–69). He also starred in "The Boy Who Predicted Earthquakes", an episode segment of Rod Serling's Night Gallery, as Herbie, a ten-year-old boy who predicts the near future, and played Billy in the made for television version of John Steinbeck's The Red Pony, with Henry Fonda and Maureen O'Hara. Howard starred in and co-wrote Cotton Candy, a 1978 made-for-TV movie, with his brother. After the success of the film, Gung Ho as a TV series began with Howard as Googie.

Howard appeared in various Star Trek episodes:

- In 1966, he appeared as the childlike alien Balok in "The Corbomite Maneuver," produced after the pilot episodes of the original series. He briefly reprised the character in 2006 on Comedy Central's roast of William Shatner.
- "Past Tense Part II," a Star Trek: Deep Space Nine episode (a part initially written for Iggy Pop)
- "Acquisition," a season one episode of Star Trek: Enterprise
- "Will You Take My Hand," a season one episode of Star Trek: Discovery
- "Under the Cloak of War," a season two episode of Star Trek: Strange New Worlds
- As a nod to Howard's prominent place in Star Trek culture, he played a part in Star Trek film director J. J. Abrams' series Fringe: in the season one episode "The Road Not Taken", as a man who thinks that he is a son of Sarek of Vulcan.

In 2003, Howard played Johnny Bark on Arrested Development in the season one episode "Key Decisions", which was produced and narrated by his brother Ron. He was seen in an episode of Married... with Children as a creepy janitor. He played a car thief/murderer Tobias Lehigh Nagy in the season four Seinfeld episode "The Trip". Howard played Creepy Rodney in the season one My Name Is Earl episode "Stole a Badge", and he was a guest star in the season three episode of the NBC show Heroes "I Am Sylar".

In 2024, Howard appeared on the CBS soap The Bold and the Beautiful as Tom Starr, a homeless man who turned his life around, only to be murdered.

=== Film ===
In Howard's film debut The Courtship of Eddie's Father (1963) based on the 1961 novel of the same name by Mark Toby and directed by Vincente Minnelli, he played a child party guest standing on a table at his birthday party . His brother, then known as Ronny, starred in the film.

Howard also voiced Roo in Disney's animated shorts Winnie the Pooh and the Honey Tree (1966) and Winnie the Pooh and the Blustery Day (1968), which were later incorporated into The Many Adventures of Winnie the Pooh (1977), and Hathi Jr. in The Jungle Book (1967). He was in Gentle Giant (1968) with Dennis Weaver, and The Wild Country (1970) with his brother and Vera Miles.

Howard has appeared in seventeen films directed by his brother, Ron, including his first directorial effort — a short film called Old Paint — when Clint was ten. He also starred in Ron's first full-length feature, Grand Theft Auto. Other roles in the elder Howard's films include: John Dexter in Cocoon (1985), Paul in Gung Ho (1986), pathologist Ricco in Backdraft (1991), Lou in Parenthood, Flynn in Far and Away (1992), flight controller Seymour Liebergot in Apollo 13 (1995), Ken in EDtv (1999), Whobris in How the Grinch Stole Christmas (2000), and Harry the referee in Cinderella Man (2005).

Howard played Sheriff Purdy in The Missing (2003), Lloyd Davis in Frost/Nixon (2008), Herbert Trimpy in The Dilemma, and Paul Lucas in the episodes "Spider" and "We Interrupt This Program" of the HBO miniseries From the Earth to the Moon, which was produced by Ron.

Howard played Eaglebauer in Rock 'n' Roll High School, Usher in Get Crazy, Paco in The Waterboy, Arthur Lynne in Uwe Boll's Heart of America as well as Salish in 2003's House of The Dead, also by Boll, cellmate Slinky in Tango & Cash, KJZZ disk jockey in That Thing You Do!, Johnson Ritter in the Austin Powers series, another flight controller in Night at the Museum: Battle of the Smithsonian, Nipples in Little Nicky (2000), Gregory Tudor in the low budget film Ice Cream Man (1995), Rughead in The Wraith (1986), Stanley Coopersmith in Evilspeak (1981), Kate the Caterer in The Cat in the Hat (2003), Doctor Koplenson in Halloween (2007), and appeared in the romantic comedies, Play the Game (2009) and Speed-Dating (2010).

Howard played Sanders in Alabama Moon (2009) and Dr. Owen in Nobody Gets Out Alive (2012), which was written and directed by Jason Christopher.

Howard appeared in Solo: A Star Wars Story (2018), which his brother Ron directed.

== Personal life ==
Howard has been married three times. After a short courtship, Howard married Ann Marie Lynch in 1988. He filed for divorce after less than a year of marriage.

Howard's second marriage, in 1995, was to Melanie Sorich. He filed for legal separation in 2015, and their divorce was finalized in 2018.

On July 1, 2020, Howard married Kat C. Cruz, at a private service in Las Vegas. They have a daughter.

Howard was an avid golfer who played 150 rounds a year from 1990 until hip replacements forced him to quit.

Howard is a Republican. On January 29, 2016, three days before the Iowa caucuses, he endorsed United States Senator Ted Cruz of Texas for the Republican presidential nomination.

Clint Howard has been struggling with drug addiction, and was sometimes "flirting with kind of homelessness" according to his brother.

== Filmography ==
=== Film ===
Year	Title	Role	Notes
1963	The Courtship of Eddie's Father	Child Party Guest	Uncredited
1966	Winnie the Pooh and the Honey Tree	Roo	Voice, short film
1966	An Eye for an Eye	Jo-Hi Quince, Brian's Son	
1967	The Jungle Book	Hathi Jr.	Voice
1967	Gentle Giant	Mark Wedloe	
1968	Winnie the Pooh and the Blustery Day	Roo	Voice, short film
1970	The Wild Country	Andrew Tanner	
1973	Salty	Tim Reed	
1976	Eat My Dust!	George Poole Jr.	
1977	The Many Adventures of Winnie the Pooh	Roo	Voice
1977	Grand Theft Auto	"Ace"	
1977	I Never Promised You a Rose Garden	Baseball Catcher	
1978	Harper Valley PTA	Corley	
1979	Rock 'n' Roll High School	Eaglebauer	
1981	Evilspeak	Stanley Coopersmith	
1982	Night Shift	Jefferey	
1983	Get Crazy	Usher	
1984	Splash	Wedding Guest	
1985	Cocoon	John Dexter	
1986	Gung Ho	Paul	
1986	The Wraith	"Rughead"	
1987	End of the Line	Les Sullivan	
1988	Freeway	Ronnie	
1988	B.O.R.N.	Jerry	
1989	Parenthood	Lou	
1989	Tango & Cash	"Slinky"	
1990	Disturbed	Brian	
1990	Silent Night, Deadly Night 4: Initiation	Ricky Baker	
1991	Backdraft	Ricco, Medical Examiner	
1991	The Rocketeer	Mark	
1991	Silent Night, Deadly Night 5: The Toy Maker	Ricky	
1992	Far and Away	Flynn	
1993	Carnosaur	"Slim" Friar	
1993	Ticks	Jarvis Tanner	
1994	The Paper	Ray Blaisch	
1994	Leprechaun 2	Tourist	
1994	Bigfoot: The Unforgettable Encounter	Gary	
1994	Forced to Kill	Drifter	
1995	Fist of the North Star	"Stalin"	
1995	Ice Cream Man	Gregory Tudor	
1995	Forget Paris	The Exterminator	
1995	Digital Man	Dawkins	
1995	Apollo 13	Sy Liebergot	
1995	Not Like Us	Wede	
1995	Twisted Love	Gardener	
1996	Barb Wire	Schmitz	
1996	Unhook the Stars	Gus	
1996	That Thing You Do!	KJZZ Disc Jockey	
1996	Santa with Muscles	Hinkley	
1997	Austin Powers: International Man of Mystery	Johnson Ritter	(credited as "radar operator")
1997	The Protector	Hutch	aka Body Armor; Conway
1998	Twilight	EMS Worker	
1998	The Dentist 2	"Mr. Toothache"	
1998	Telling You	Customer	Uncredited
1998	The Waterboy	Paco	
1998	Evasive Action	Hector "The Director" Miller	
1999	EDtv	Ken	
1999	Austin Powers: The Spy Who Shagged Me	Johnson Ritter	
2000	My Dog Skip	Millard	
2000	The Million Dollar Kid	Harvey	
2000	Little Nicky	"Nipples"	
2000	Ping!	Stu	
2000	How the Grinch Stole Christmas	Whobris	
2001	Blackwoods	Greg	
2001	A Beautiful Mind	Man Yelling	Voice; Uncredited
2002	Austin Powers in Goldmember	Johnson Ritter	
2002	Heart of America	Artie Lynne	
2002	100 Women	Mr. Willens	
2003	Pauly Shore Is Dead	Pauly's Business Manager	
2003	House of the Dead	Salish	
2003	The Cat in the Hat	Kate, The Caterer	
2003	The Missing	Sheriff Purdy	
2004	Raising Genius	Mr. Goss	
2004	The Sure Hand of God	Clyde Trotter	
2004	I Am Stamos	Himself	Short film
2005	River's End	Mr. Powell	
2005	My Big Fat Independent Movie	The Mechanic	
2005	Cinderella Man	Referee	
2005	Planet Ibsen	Henrik Ibsen	
2005	Fun with Dick and Jane	INS Agent	
2006	Church Ball	Gene Jensen	
2006	The Powder Puff Principle	Principal Richard Skelter	Short film
2006	Curious George	Balloon Man	Voice
2006	How to Eat Fried Worms	Uncle Ed	
2006	Big Bad Wolf	Fulton Chaney	
2007	Music Within	The Clerk	
2007	Halloween	Dr. Koplenson	
2007	A Plumm Summer	Binky The Clown	
2007	A Christmas Too Many	Todd	
2008	Foreign Exchange	Larry "Long Larry"	
2008	Frost/Nixon	Lloyd Davis	
2008	Senior Skip Day	Lionel Huffer	
2009	London Betty	The Narrator	Voice
2009	Play the Game	Dick	
2009	Super Capers	Mugger	
2009	Night at the Museum: Battle of the Smithsonian	Air and Space Mission Control Tech #1	
2009	Curious George 2: Follow That Monkey!	Farmer Dan	Voice
2009	The Haunted World of El Superbeasto	Cthulhu	Voice
2009	Alabama Moon	Constable Sanders	
2010	Holyman Undercover	Roy Sr.	
2010	Speed-Dating	Dom	
2011	The Dilemma	Herbert Trimpy	
2011	Blubberella	Dr. Wolfgang Mangler	
2011	BloodRayne: The Third Reich	Dr. Wolfgang Mangler	
2011	Night Club	Cliff	
2012	Last Call	George	
2012	The Lords of Salem	Carlo	
2012	Nobody Gets Out Alive	Dr. Owen	
2013	Assault on Wall Street	Chuck	
2013	Huff	Karl	
2013	Sparks	Gordon Eldridge	
2013	The Profane Exhibit	Bob	Segment: "Basement"
2014	Bald	Nathan	Short film
2014	Sand Castles	Todd Carlson	
2014	Balls Out	Philip	
2015	The Funhouse Massacre	Taxidermist	
2016	Guys and Girls Can't Be Friends	Gus	
2017	Mad Families	"Gravy"	
2018	The Church	Alexander James / The Spirit	
2018	Solo: A Star Wars Story	Ralakili	
2018	F**k You All: The Uwe Boll Story	Himself	Documentary film
2019	Grand-Daddy Day Care	Judge Littles	
2019	Play the Flute	Mr. Webber	
2019	Apple Seed	Hughie	
2019	3 from Hell	Mr. Baggy Britches	
2019	American Christmas	Lee	
2020	American Pie Presents: Girls' Rules	Joe	
2023	The Old Way	Eustice	
2024	Terrifier 3	"Smokey"	
2026	Buddy	George	
TBA	Another Ice Cream Man	—N/a	Filming; co-directed with Carmelo Chimera

=== Television ===
Year	Title	Role	Notes
1962–1964	The Andy Griffith Show	Leon / Boy At Church Social (uncredited)	5 episodes
1963	Breaking Point	Mikey	Episode: "The Gnu, Now Almost Extinct"
1964	Vacation Playhouse	Little Boy	Episode: "Hey, Teacher"
1964–1965	The Baileys of Balboa	Stanley	26 episodes
1964–1965	The Fugitive	Billy Taft / Johnny Stransel	Episodes: "Home Is the Hunted" / "Set Fire to a Straw Man"
1965	Bonanza	Michael Thorpe	Episode: "All Ye His Saints"
1966	The Patty Duke Show	Ralphie	Episode: "Three Little Kittens"
1965–1966	Please Don't Eat the Daisies	David / Davey	3 episodes
1965–1970	The F.B.I.	Alan Ellwood / Josh Cobb	Episodes: "An Elephant Is Like a Rope" / "Incident in the Desert"
1966–1971	The Virginian	Will / Tommy / Manuel	3 episodes
1966	The Jean Arthur Show	Robbie Fielding	Episode: "My Client, the Rooster"
1966	Star Trek: The Original Series	Balok	S1:E10, "The Corbomite Maneuver"
1966	Laredo	Midj	Episode: "Leave It to Dixie"
1967	The Monroes	Jody Larson	Episode: "Teaching the Tiger to Purr"
1967	Judd for the Defense	Tim Oliver	Episode: "A Civil Case of Murder"
1967–1969	Gentle Ben	Mark Wedloe	56 episodes
1970	Lancer	Willie Sharpe	Episode: "Blue Skies for Willie Sharpe"
1970	Love, American Style	David Kaufman	Episode: "Love and the Coed Dorm/Love and the Optimist/Love and the Teacher"
1970	The Red Skelton Show	Lemonade Stand Proprietor	Episode: "Stone Walls Do Not a Prison Make: So They Added Iron Bars"
1970	The Odd Couple	Randy Granger	Episode: "The Big Brothers"
1970	Family Affair	Tom Richards	Episode: "Say Uncle"
1971	Gunsmoke	Lonny	Episode: "Murdoch"
1971	The Mod Squad	Davey Carr	Episode: "The Price of Love"
1971	Marcus Welby, M.D.	Kimmy Rolf	Episode: "Tender Comrade"
1971	Night Gallery	Herbie Bittman	"The Boy Who Predicted Earthquakes"
1971	Nanny and the Professor	Timmy McGovern	Episode: "One for the Road"
1971–1973	Insight	Larry Gilprin	2 episodes
1973	The Rookies	Dennis Palmer	Episode: "Crossfire"
1973	The Red Pony	Jody Tiflin	Television film
1973–1974	The Streets of San Francisco	Billy Rudolph	2 episodes
1974	Doc Elliot	Paul Scarne	Episode: "A Small Hand of Friendship"
1974	The Cowboys	Steve	12 episodes
1974	Movin' On	Mark / Henry	Episodes: "Life Line" / "The Trick is to Stay Alive"
1975	Walt Disney's Wonderful World of Color	Andrew	Episode: "Wild Country: Part 2"
1975	Huckleberry Finn	Arch	Television film
1976–1980	Happy Days	"Moose"	2 episodes
1977	The Death of Richie	"Peanuts"	Television film
1978	The Fitzpatricks	D'Annunzio	Episode: "A Living Wage"
1978	Cotton Candy	Corky MacPherson	Television film
1982	Lou Grant	Jerry Kovacovich	Episode: "Recovery"
1986–1987	Gung Ho	"Googie"	9 episodes
1987	Sledge Hammer!	Police Officer	Episode: "State of Sledge"
1987	Santa Barbara	Marshall	Episode: "#1.677"
1990	Hunter	Man In Restaurant	Episode: "Kill Zone"
1992	Seinfeld	Tobias Lehigh Nagy	Episode: "The Trip" Part 2
1993–1994	Space Rangers	Mimmer	6 episodes
1994	Cheyenne Warrior	Otto Nielsen	Television film
1995	Star Trek: Deep Space Nine	Grady	Episode: "Past Tense"
1995	Married... with Children	Mullen	Episode: "And Bingo Was Her Game-O"
1995	Silk Stalkings	Craig P. Sykes	Episode: "Kill Shot"
1996	The Outer Limits	Dennis	Episode: "First Anniversary"
1996	Humanoids from the Deep	Deputy	Television film
1997	Gun	The Homeless Guy	Episode: "The Shot"
1998	From the Earth to the Moon	Paul Lucas	Miniseries
1998	Addams Family Reunion	Dogcatcher (uncredited)	Television film
1999	Total Recall 2070	Pontifex	Episode: "Baby Lottery"
1999	The Pretender	"Smitty"	Episode: "Qallupilluit"
1999	Arthur's Quest	Mr. Whitney	Television film
2002	Star Trek: Enterprise	Muk	Episode: "Acquisition"
2002	Rapsittie Street Kids: Believe In Santa	Tug	Voice, television film
2003	Crossing Jordan	Gil Runkis	Episode: "The First Six Years"
2003–2013	Arrested Development	Johnny Bark	2 episodes
2006–2008	My Name Is Earl	Rodney "Creepy Rodney"	2 episodes
2009	Heroes	Tom Miller	Episode: "I Am Sylar"
2009	Fringe	Emmanuel Grayson	Episode: "The Road Not Taken"
2011	Workaholics	Replacement For Adam Demamp	Episode: "The Strike"
2013	Call Me Crazy: A Five Film	Harold	Television film; segment: "Lucy"
2013	Hawaii Five-0	Superintendent	Episode: "Kupouli 'la"; uncredited
2014	Key & Peele	Aerobics Director	Episode: "Aerobics Meltdown"
2014	The Birthday Boys	Traffic Control Operator	Episode: "Plight of the Working Class"
2016	Still the King	Dave "Crazy Dave"	2 episodes
2018	Star Trek: Discovery	Orion Drug Dealer	Episode: "Will You Take My Hand?"
2019	Those Who Can't	Howard	Episode: "Grisly Man"
2021	Just Roll with It	Adrian Rose	Episode: "Warlock World: War of the Warlocks"
2022	Pam & Tommy	Schmitz	Episode: "Destroyer of Worlds"
2023	Star Trek: Strange New Worlds	Commander Buck Martinez	Episode: "Under the Cloak of War"
2024	The Bold and the Beautiful	Tom Starr	Recurring role Nominated — Daytime Emmy Award for Outstanding Guest Performer in a Drama Series (2025)

Podcasts
Year	Title	Role	Notes	Ref.
2020–2021	The Shadow Diaries	Dr. Richard Summers	Voice role	

Video games
Year	Title	Voice role
1998	Tex Murphy: Overseer	Larry Hammond

== Published work ==
- Howard, Ron; Howard, Clint (2021). The Boys: A Memoir of Hollywood and Family (Hardcover) (1st ed.). New York City: William Morrow and Company. ISBN 978-0063065246.
