= Huckleberry Finn (1975 film) =

- Genre: Adventure
- Based on: Huckleberry Finn by Mark Twain
- Screenplay by: Jean Holloway
- Directed by: Robert Totten
- Starring: Ron Howard; Donny Most; Royal Dano; Antonio Fargas
- Theme music composer: Earl Robinson
- Country of origin: United States
- Original language: English

Production
- Producer: Steven North
- Cinematography: Andrew Jackson
- Editors: Diane Adler; Marsh Hendry
- Running time: 78 minutes
- Production company: ABC Circle Films

Original release
- Network: ABC
- Release: March 25, 1975

Huckleberry Finn is a 1975 American television film adaptation of Mark Twain's famous 1884 boyhood novel, Huckleberry Finn. The film stars Ron Howard as the eponymous lead.

== Plot ==
The film starts off with Huckleberry “Huck” Finn, in a small Missouri town in the 1830s. He has gotten adopted by the Widow Douglas, who educates him and teaches him religion. Huck is used to a life in the woods, doing whatever he wanted, so Huck is disappointed by this change, wishing to go back to his old ways. But the biggest problem is when Huck's abusive alcoholic father Pap Finn returns, and kidnaps him into a cabin in the forest. Thirsting for escape, Huck stages his own murder with red berries, and escapes to a nearby island on a raft. At the island, Huck meets a runaway slave named Jim, whom Huck actually knew before. Jim has escaped, because he heard that his master was trying to sell him. Huck and Jim decide to join forces on a journey to Cairo, Illinois, where all slaves are free. On their journey, a big powerful storm hits, and they find a flooded house with Pap's dead body in it, clothes, and money. To find out what's happening in town, Huck dresses up as a girl (calling himself Mary Sarah Williams) and talks to a townswomen who says that Jim has been accused of murdering Huck. In fear of his newfound friend, he tells Jim the news and they continue on their journey from freedom. But that wasn't their only problems, as they experience bad weather, fog that briefly separates them, and a sinking ship full of criminals! But the friends stay together throughout this mishap, determined to find freedom. One day, two conmen who call themselves the King and the Duke (because they want people to think they are actually royalty) join their raft to go to town and cruelly scam others for money. They advertise wonderful Shakespearean plays, only to scam the audience by performing poorly acted ones. But one day, they pretend to be relatives of a deceased wealthily man named Peter Wilkes to steal their money. Angry and determined to do the right thing, Huck tells Peter Wilkes’ daughter, Mary Jane, the conmen's secrets and their plan to steal their money. Fortunately, Mary Jane spills the conmen's secrets, and the townspeople tar and feather them. Huck escapes, soon finding out that Jim has been sold to a farm belonging to the Phelps family! Huck soon arrives, the Phelps family (who are the relatives of his friend Tom Sawyer) believe he is Tom, and take him in. Soon, Tom arrives for a visit, forcing huck to convince them that Tom is his half-brother Sidney. Huck and Tom decide to free Jim, who was living in a shed, chained up. But Tom wants Jim's escape to be fun and theatrical, like in the adventure novels he reads. Soon, Tom plays a cruel, childish game to make Jim's escape more adventurous. Eventually, when they do escape, Tom gets shot in the leg by people that are trying to stop Jim's escape. Jim fetches a doctor, risking his freedom for Tom's life. But soon, Jim find out that he had been released by the Widow Douglas before she died while Huck and Jim were on their journey, soon pursuing a freedom he always desired. Soon, Huck gets the chance to become adopted by the Phelps, but Huck decides to resume a life of freedom in the wilderness, away from the cruel rules of mankind.

== Cast ==
- Ron Howard as Huckleberry Finn
- Donny Most as Tom Sawyer
- Royal Dano as Mark Twain
- Antonio Fargas as Jim
- Jack Elam as The King
- Merle Haggard as The Duke
- Rance Howard as Pap Finn
- Dee Carroll as Aunt Sally
- Clint Howard as Arch
- James Almanzar as Silas Phelps
- Jean Speegle Howard as Widow Douglas
- Bill Erwin as Harvey Wilkes

== Filming locations ==
The film was shot in Missouri, in Arrow Rock, Lupus, and for exteriors, Colusa County, California.

== Awards ==
The film won a 1976 Primetime Emmy Award for "Outstanding Children's Special", tying with You're a Good Sport, Charlie Brown.

== See also ==
- List of American films of 1975
- List of films featuring slavery
