= Brit Morgan =

American actress (born 1987)

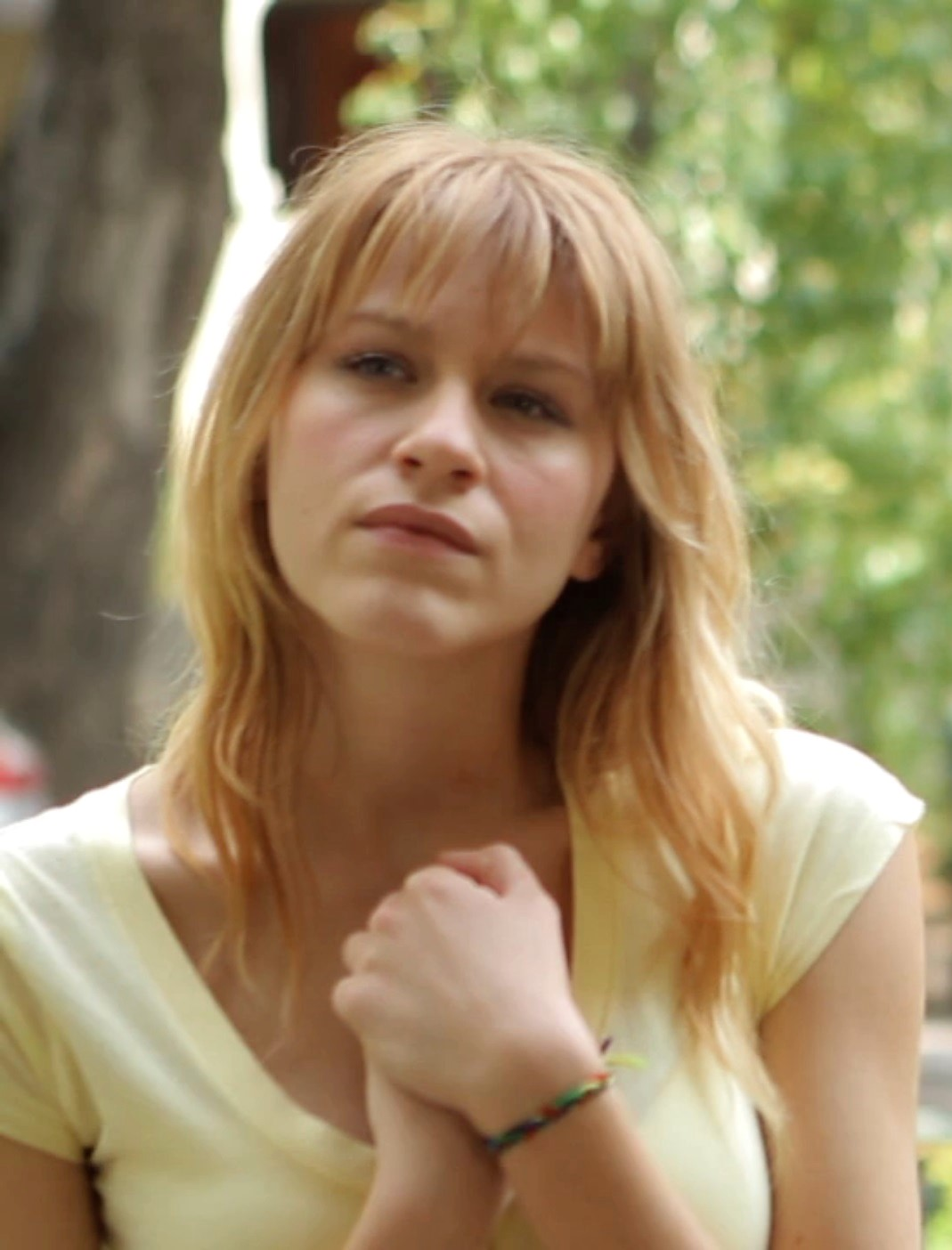
- Morgan in the 2012 film Cheesecake Casserole
- Born: Brittany Morgan Dengler; September 24, 1987 (age 38); Marlton, New Jersey, U.S.
- Occupation: Actress
- Years active: 2007–present

Brittany Morgan Dengler (born September 24, 1987) is an American actress.

== Early life ==
Morgan was born and raised in the Marlton section of Evesham Township, New Jersey, where she was a 2005 graduate of Cherokee High School.

== Career ==
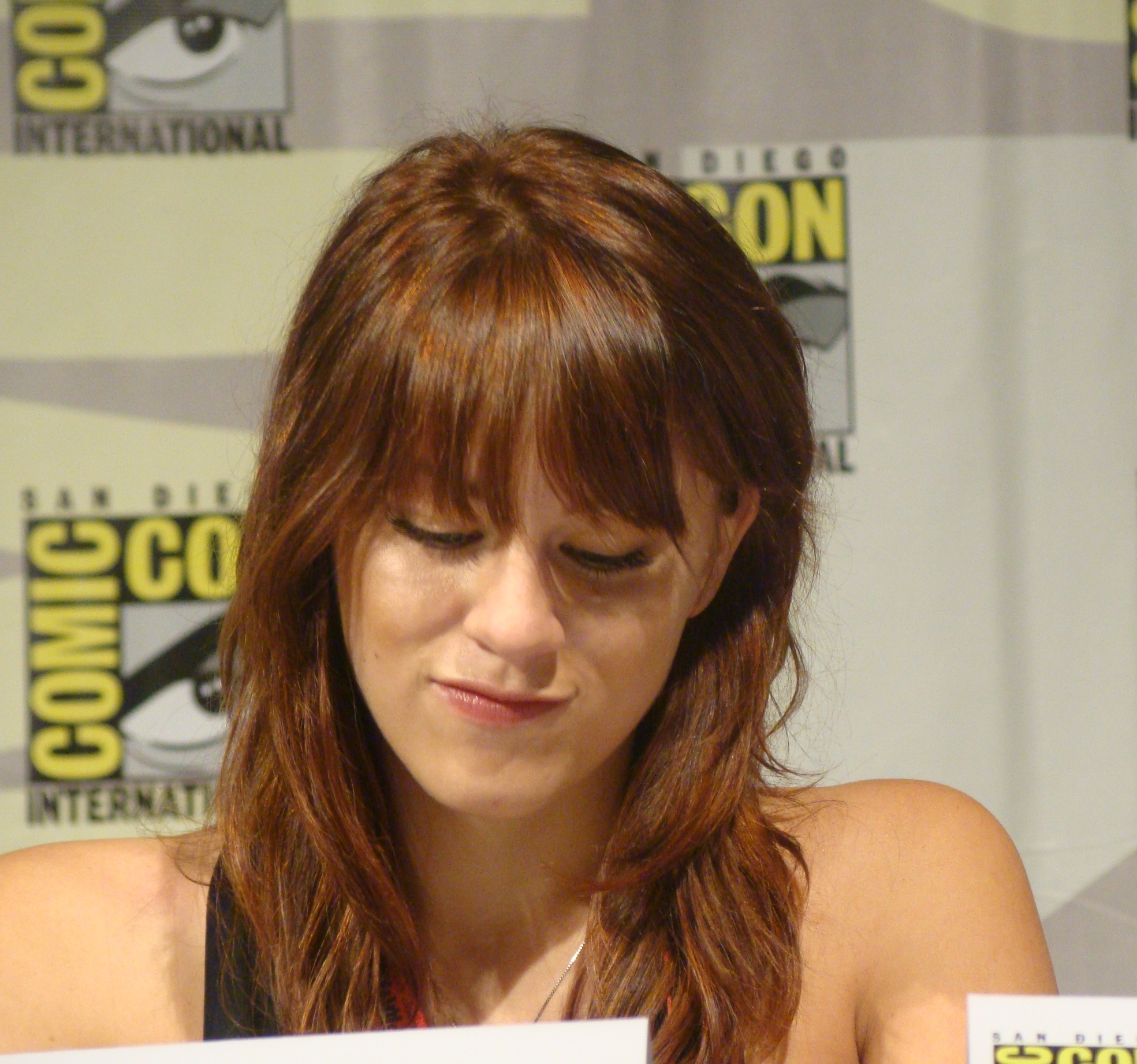
Morgan at the 2009 San Diego Comic-Con

Morgan's first major recurring role was in 2008, as Lacey Thornfield on ABC Family's science-fiction comedy-drama series The Middleman. She was listed as one of Nylon magazine's "55 Faces of the Future" in their Young Hollywood issue in May 2010.

From 2010 to 2011, she appeared as Debbie Pelt in HBO's vampire drama series True Blood. In an interview with TV Guide, Morgan described her character Debbie as "a really kick-ass, passionate, ballsy woman." In 2012, she appeared in four films: Cheesecake Casserole, She Wants Me, The Frozen and Freeloaders. She played Emma in the thriller film The Frozen, which followed a couple (Morgan and Seth David Mitchell), who end up stranded in freezing cold after a snowmobile accident.

Morgan had a supporting role in the thriller film Friend Request (2016) as Olivia Mathison, a best friend to a college student being stalked by a supernatural creature on social media. The film was shot in South Africa. Starting with the second-season premiere, Morgan has recurred as Penny Peabody on The CW's supernatural drama series Riverdale. She played Taressa in the comedy film The Donor Party (2023). In 2023, she directed a short film, Cupcakes.

== Filmography ==
=== Film ===
Year	Title	Role	Notes
2007	The Beginning of the End	Bar Girl #2	Short film
2008	Beer for My Horses	Harveyetta	
2011	Paralyzed	Betty	Short film
2012	Cheesecake Casserole	Cal	
2012	She Wants Me	Carly	
2012	The Frozen	Emma	
2012	Freeloaders	Samantha	
2013	Free Ride	Rain	
2016	Friend Request	Olivia Mathison	
2020	Monsters and Muses	Sally Santini	Short film
2023	The Donor Party	Taressa	
2025	Granite Rapids Moon	Cammy	

=== Television ===
Year	Title	Role	Notes
2007	Buried Alive	Melanie	Miniseries
2007	CSI: NY	Robin Graham	Episode: "Time's Up"
2007	Greek	Gym Girl	Episode: "The Rusty Nail"
2008	The Middleman	Lacey Thornfield	12 episodes
2008	Family Man	Callie	Television film
2008	Quitters	Brit	Television film
2009	Cold Case	Libby Traynor (1976)	Episode: "Jackals"
2010–2011	True Blood	Debbie Pelt	14 episodes
2012	Shameless	Lucy Jo Heisner	Episode: "A Beautiful Mess"
2012	Southland	Natasha	Episode: "God's Work"
2012	Desperate Housewives	Lindsay	Episode: "The People Will Hear"
2012	Two and a Half Men	Jill	Episode: "I Changed My Mind About the Milk"
2013	Ironside	Zoe	Episode: "Pentimento"
2014–2015	Graceland	Amber	10 episodes
2014	Criminal Minds	Jane Posner	Episode: "The Itch"
2014	The Mentalist	Marie Flanigan	Episode: "The Graybar Hotel"
2015	The Night Shift	Tricia	Episode: "Recovery"
2015–2018	Supergirl	Leslie Willis / Livewire	Recurring role, 4 episodes
2016	Law & Order: Special Victims Unit	Jenna Miller	Episode: "Heightened Emotions"
2016	Rizzoli & Isles	Kelly Wagner	Episode: "2M7258-100"
2017	The Arrangement	Daisy Something / Daisy Parsons	Episode: "The Ex", "Crashing"
2017–2019	Riverdale	Penny Peabody	Recurring role
2019	The Boys	Rachel	Episode: "Good for the Soul"
2024	The Rookie	Megan	Episode: "Strike Back"
2024	S.W.A.T.	Beth Weber	Episode: "Family Man"

=== Music videos ===
Year	Title	Artist(s)
2018	"Trouble Man"	Chris Pierce

=== Producer credits ===
Year	Title	Role	Notes
2023	Cupcakes	Executive producer and director	Short film
