= Mark Kiely =

American actor

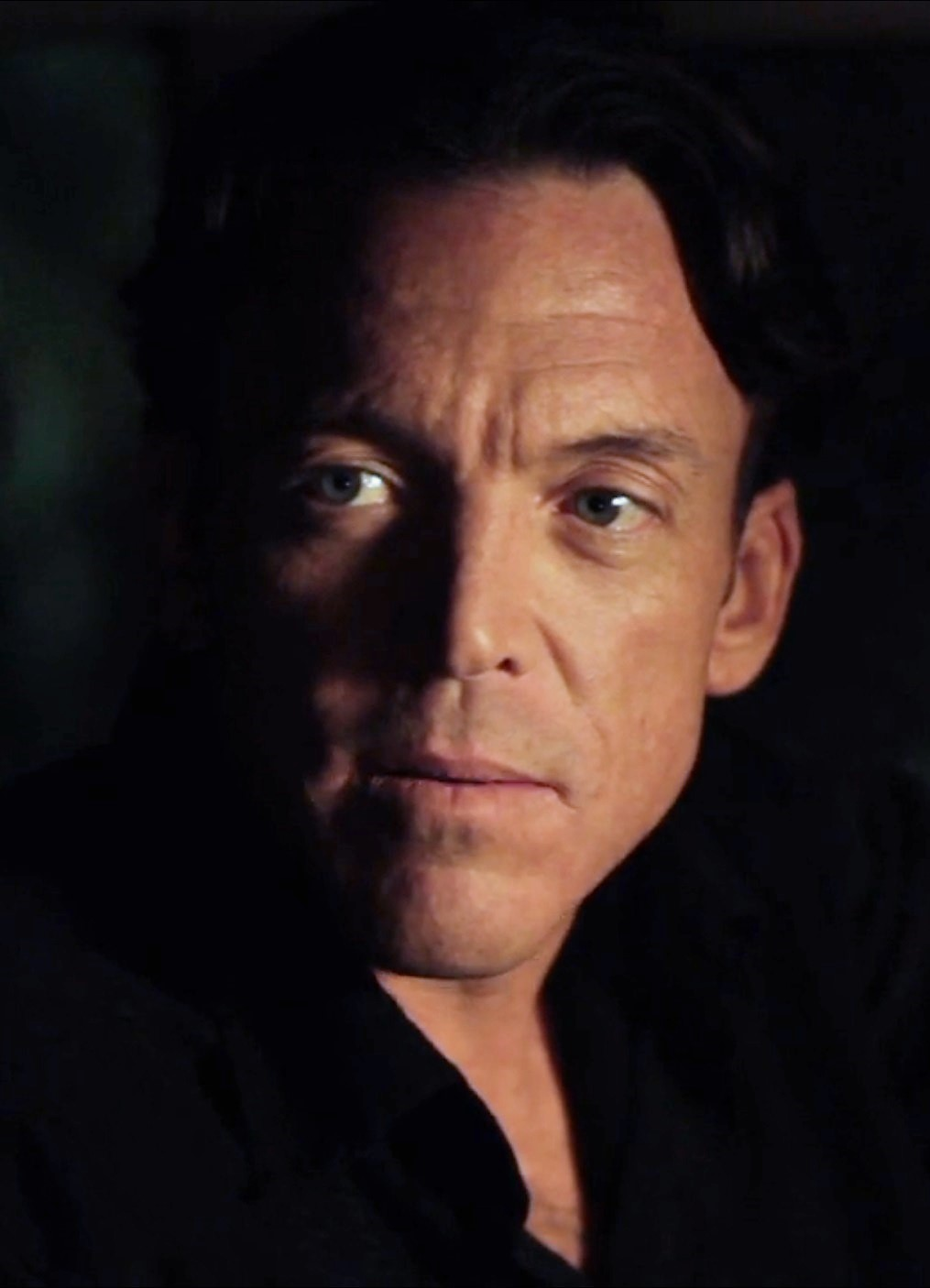
- Mark Kiely
- Born: January 16, 1963 (age 63); Providence, Rhode Island; United States
- Occupation: actor
- Years active: 1992-present

Mark Kiely is an American actor, best known for his recurring guest appearance as Gil Meyers in Beverly Hills, 90210. He also appeared in The Judge. He currently lives in Rhode Island, and was a competitive swimming coach. He continues to accept acting roles. He graduated from Assumption University in Worcester, Massachusetts.

== Partial filmography ==
=== Television ===
- Beverly Hills, 90210 (1992–1995)
- Tears and Laughter: The Joan and Melissa Rivers Story (1994)
- Star Trek: Voyager (1995)
- Full Circle (1996)
- Lois & Clark: The New Adventures of Superman (1996)
- NYPD Blue (1996–1997)
- JAG (1996, 2003)
- Diagnosis Murder (1997)
- A Nightmare Come True (1997)
- Brooklyn South (1997–1998)
- Primal Force (1999)
- City of Angels (2000)
- Rain (2000)
- Walker, Texas Ranger (2000)
- The Fugitive (2001)
- Crossing Jordan (2002)
- The Shield (2002)
- American Dreams (2003)
- The Guardian (2003)
- CSI (2004)
- Without a Trace (2004)
- CSI: Miami (2006)
- CSI: NY (2007)
- 24 (season 7, 2009)

=== Movies ===
- Full Circle (1996)
- The Edge (1997)
- Gods and Monsters (1998)
- Falcon Down (2000)
- Daybreak (2000)
- Bruce Almighty (2003)
- Johnny Virus (2005)
- Islander (2006)
- Cheesecake Casserole (2012)
- The Judge (2014)
