= Cotton Candy (1978 film) =

1978 film by Ron Howard

- Genre: Drama
- Written by: Ron Howard; Clint Howard
- Directed by: Ron Howard
- Starring: Charles Martin Smith; Clint Howard; Leslie King; Kevin Lee Miller
- Music by: Joe Renzetti
- Country of origin: United States
- Original language: English

Production
- Producer: John Thomas Lenox
- Production location: Dallas
- Cinematography: Robert Jessup
- Editor: Robert J. Kern Jr.
- Running time: 97 minutes
- Production companies: Major H Productions; Ron Howard Productions

Original release
- Network: NBC
- Release: October 26, 1978

Cotton Candy is a 1978 American made-for-television drama film directed by Ron Howard and broadcast on NBC. It is also known as Ron Howard's Cotton Candy.

== Plot ==
George Smalley is a high school senior trying to find direction in life. His attempt to land a spot on the varsity football team fails when he is cut from the team. A songwriter in his spare time, he and his pal, Corky Macpherson, recruit other local teens to form a rock band to ultimately perform in the town's Battle of the Bands competition. Together, they recruit a set of brothers who play keyboards and guitar, a former gang member on bass guitar, and a talented female drummer. Meanwhile, big man on campus Torbin Bequette leads a rival band, Rapid Fire (whose entire repertoire seems to consist of a hard rock version of "I Shot the Sheriff"), and attempts to undermine George and Corky's band. The movie climaxes with the two bands going toe to toe in the Battle of the Bands final.

== Cast ==
- Charles Martin Smith as George Smalley
- Clint Howard as Corky Macpherson
- Leslie King as Brenda Matthews
- Manuel Padilla Jr. as Julio Sanchez
- Kevin Lee Miller as Barry Bates
- Dean Scofield as Bart Bates
- Rance Howard as Mr. Bremmercamp
- Mark Wheeler as Torbin Bequette
- Alvy Moore as Mr. Smalley
- Joan Crosby as Mrs. Smalley
- William H. Burkett as Mr. Barton
- Bill Hosmer as Uncredited Extra
- Joseph Renzetti Music score & Music Director

== Production ==
The film was the first production for Major H Productions, which Howard had created in 1977 with his father Rance and brother Clint.

Filming took place in Dallas, Texas, at Lake Highlands High School and at the Town East Mall for the Battle of the Bands event.
