= Cheesecake Casserole =

- Film poster
- Directed by: Renji Philip
- Screenplay by: Renji Philip; Meghan Gambling
- Story by: Renji Philip; Jamie Stein
- Starring: Torrey DeVitto; Brit Morgan; Paige Howard; Ryan Merriman; Louis Herthum; Mark Kiely
- Cinematography: Colin Brink
- Edited by: Matthew Rundell
- Music by: Tracy Bartelle; Josh Mancell
- Production company: Axis Pacific Filmworks
- Distributed by: Warner Bros.; Gravitas Ventures; B.D. Fox Independent
- Release date: July 3, 2012
- Country: United States
- Language: English

Cheesecake Casserole is a 2012 American comedy-drama film directed by Renji Philip and written by Philip and Jamie Stein. The film stars Torrey DeVitto, Brit Morgan, Paige Howard, Ryan Merriman, Louis Herthum and Mark Kiely. The film focuses on the relationships between four best friends, who get together for a final celebration before graduating from college.

== Plot ==
The film tells the story of four young best friends who spend their last weekend together before graduating from college. Their girls' weekend is soon interrupted when the boys crash the party. The girls notice that a lot of things have changed since they were freshman roommates at college, and secrets start to come out. Four friends eventually have to face challenges of career, marriage, jealousy, lost love, mother's suicide and letting love in.

The film's official trailer introduces the girls as the "sexy" one (Margo), the "faithful" one (Jess), the "sensitive" one (Avy) and the "lost" one (Cal).

== Cast ==
- Torrey DeVitto as Margo
- Brit Morgan as Cal
- Paige Howard as Jess
- Rome Brooks as Avy
- Ryan Merriman as Andy
- Louis Herthum as Howard
- Mark Kiely as Eric D

== Production ==
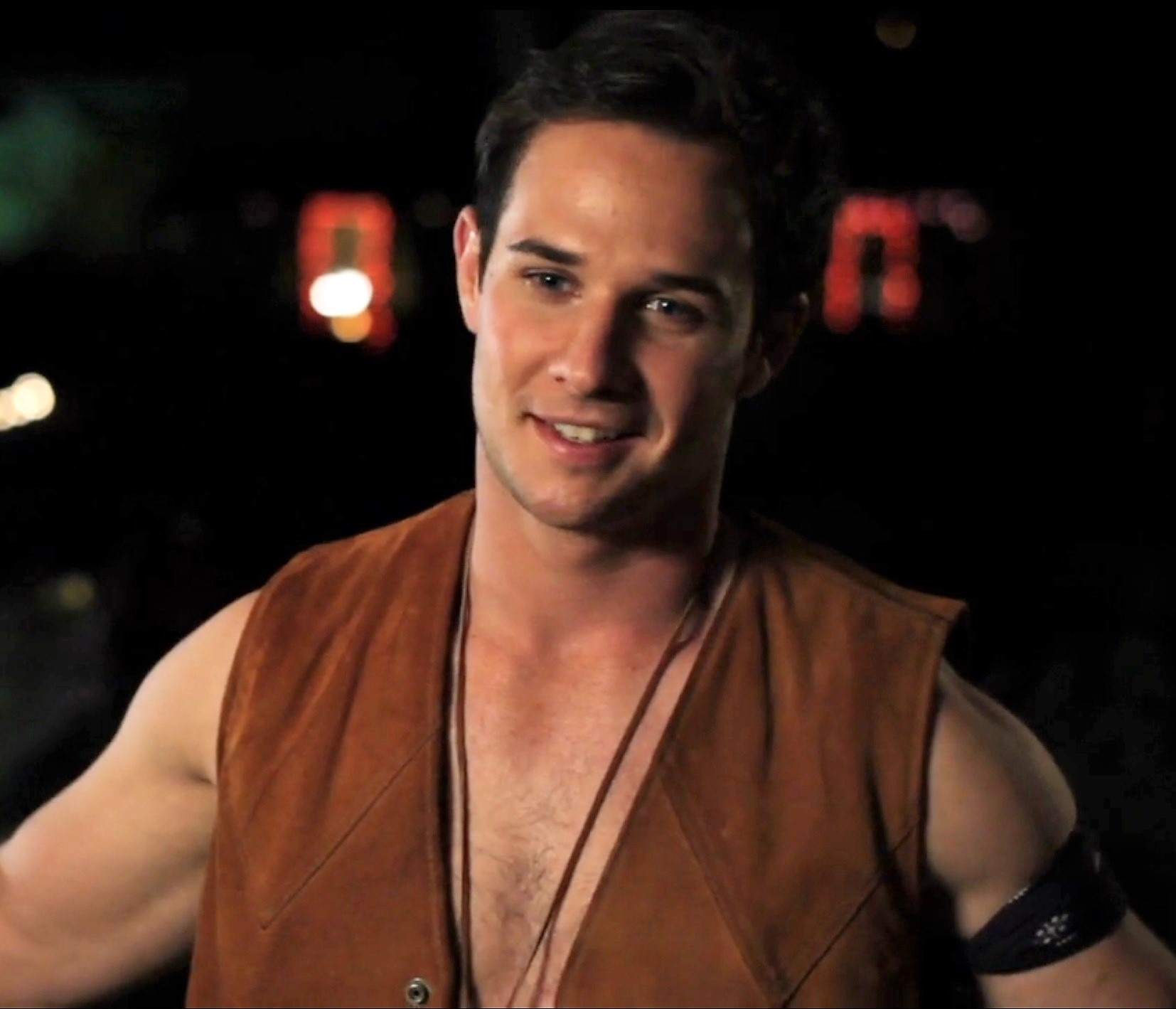
Ryan Merriman in Cheesecake Casserole.

The film was shot in two weeks in Los Angeles, and primarily in one location due to budgetary constraints. James Stein, who produced and co-wrote the feature-length film, said that making use of one major location would become an "essential part of the story landscape."

Stein said that all actresses in the film mentioned that "they were drawn to our project specifically because it gave them the rare opportunity to play interesting characters with complete dramatic arcs."

The film was marketed through social media campaigns on Facebook and Tumblr.

== Reception ==
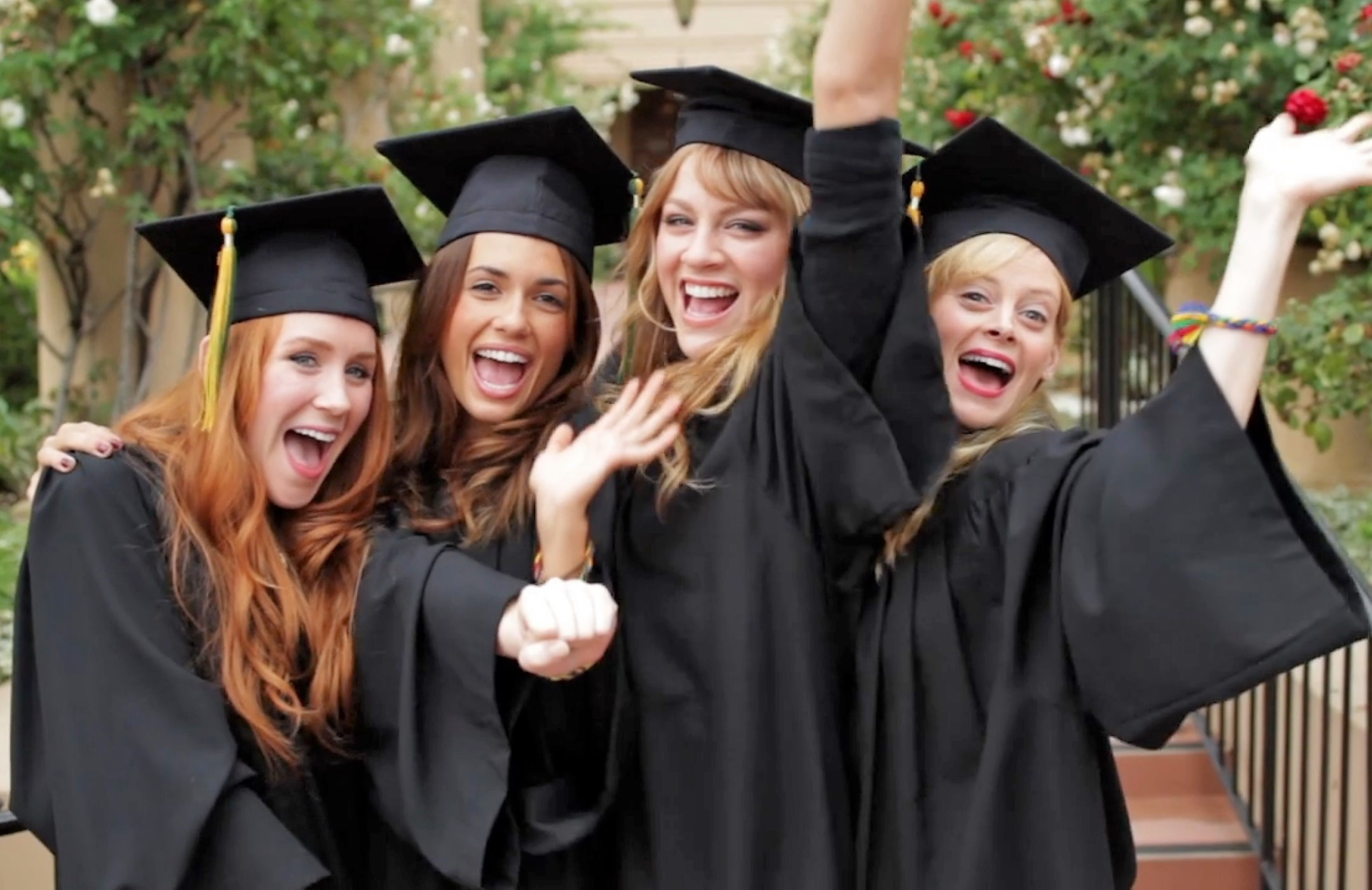
Left to right: Paige Howard, Torrey DeVitto, Brit Morgan and Rome Brooks in Cheesecake Casserole

Mr.media wrote of the film: "Each has a tangled narrative and, for Paige Howard’s Jess, there is something emotionally fraught bubbling beneath the surface of the beautiful redhead. Cheesecake Casserole might as well be called 'Four Chicks and a DB' – that’s “Douchebag” –because one of the girls has been followed to the getaway by her boyfriend Rudy, played by Rocco Nugent."

== Release ==
Cheesecake Casserole was released in 50 million homes across the United States via iTunes, Amazon, and on-demand cable channels on July 3, 2012. The film's DVD, with exclusive special features such as a blooper reel, cast interviews and deleted scenes, is sold on Amazon.

The film became available on video streaming service Netflix in February 2013.
