= Rance Howard =

American actor (1928–2017)

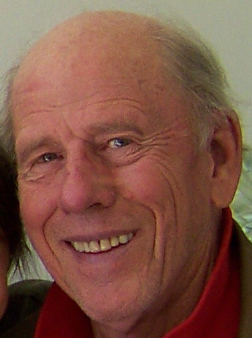
- Howard in 2007
- Born: Harold Engle Beckenholdt; November 17, 1928; Newkirk, Oklahoma, U.S.
- Died: November 25, 2017 (aged 89); Los Angeles, California, U.S.
- Resting place: Hollywood Forever Cemetery, Los Angeles, California, U.S.
- Education: University of Oklahoma
- Occupation: Actor
- Years active: 1948–2017
- Spouses: Jean Speegle (m. 1949; died 2000); Judy Howard (m. 2001; died 2017)
- Children: Ron; Clint
- Relatives: Bryce Dallas Howard (granddaughter); Paige Howard (granddaughter)

Signature
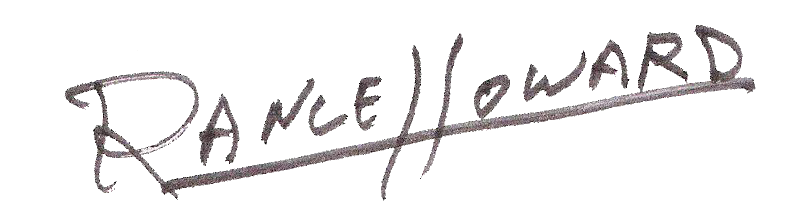

Rance Howard (born Harold Engle Beckenholdt; November 17, 1928 – November 25, 2017) was an American actor who starred in film and on television. He was the father of actor and filmmaker Ron Howard and actor Clint Howard, and grandfather of actresses Bryce Dallas Howard and Paige Howard.

Howard appeared in films such as Cool Hand Luke (1967), Chinatown (1974), Splash (1984), Ed Wood (1994), Apollo 13 (1995), Independence Day (1996), A Beautiful Mind (2001), Cinderella Man (2005), Frost/Nixon (2008), Nebraska, and Max Rose (both 2013). He received a Primetime Emmy Award for Outstanding Children's Program for co-producing the television film The Time Crystal (1981). He was best known for his role as Mr. Fillmore in Two of a Kind (American TV series) starring Mary-Kate Olsen and Ashley Olsen.

== Early life ==
Howard was born Harold Engle Beckenholdt in Newkirk, Kay County, Oklahoma, the son of Ethel Cleo (née Tomlin) and Engel Beckenholdt, a farmer. He legally changed his name to "Rance Howard" when he became an actor. Howard graduated from Shidler High School in 1946 and studied at the University of Oklahoma.

While in the Air Force, Howard directed plays in Special Services, a unit that provided entertainment for service members.

== Career ==
His professional acting career began in 1948 when he went to New York City, auditioned, and landed a job in a children's touring company. The role that got him noticed nationally for television and film was playing the part of Lindstrom in the touring company of the play Mister Roberts with Henry Fonda in 1950, portraying the character for about a year-and-a-half in major cities across the U.S.

Both Rance and elder son Ron, who was two at the time, made their feature-film debuts together in the 1956 Western Frontier Woman. Later in the 1950s, Rance's roles included his TV debut in the series Kraft Theatre, on which he appeared three times in 1956–57.

After son Ron went on to play Opie in The Andy Griffith Show in the early 1960s, Rance had guest parts in five episodes of the show. Howard was known best for his role on television in 25 episodes of the 1960s TV series Gentle Ben starring his younger son, Clint. Howard played Henry Boomhauer, a backwoodsman who befriended the family. Another well-known TV role was on Babylon 5, in which he had a recurring role as David Sheridan, the father of Babylon 5 captain John Sheridan. He also starred in the short-lived 2000 TV series Driving Me Crazy. His television guest appearances include Gunsmoke, Bonanza, Kung Fu, The Waltons, CBS Schoolbreak Special 1986 episode "The Drug Knot", Angel, Married... with Children, 7th Heaven, Two of a Kind, Cold Case, That's So Raven, and two appearances on Seinfeld (as different characters). On The Waltons, Howard portrayed Dr. McIver in five different episodes, one of which included Ron.

Howard appeared in over 100 films, including the movies The Music Man (1962) (in an uncredited bit part playing "Oscar Jackson"), Cool Hand Luke (1967), Chinatown (1974), and many other films. Howard acted in many of his son Ron's films including Splash (1984), Cocoon (1985), Apollo 13 (1995), A Beautiful Mind (2001), Cinderella Man (2005) and Frost/Nixon (2008). He also appeared as Dottie and Kit's father in A League of Their Own (1992), as well as in the films Ed Wood (1994), Independence Day (1996) and Max Rose (2013). In 2013, he played Woody Grant's brother in Nebraska. He often took parts as a priest or minister, county sheriff, or western marshal, and made numerous appearances in films by Joe Dante.

His final film role, completed in September 2017, is also the largest in his career. He plays the role of Carl Robbins in the Michael Worth road-trip drama, Apple Seed, playing on film for the first time the father of his real-life son Clint.

== Personal life ==
Howard married actress Jean Speegle Howard in Winchester, Kentucky, in 1949. They remained married until her death in September 2000. Their sons are actor and filmmaker Ron Howard and actor Clint Howard, their granddaughters include actresses Bryce Dallas Howard and Paige Howard. Ron was born while his father served three years in the United States Air Force.

In 2001, Howard married Judy O’Sullivan. Judy Howard died in January 2017 in Burbank, 10 months before Howard's death.

== Death ==
Howard died on the morning of November 25, 2017, in Los Angeles, California from heart failure spurred on by a West Nile virus infection.

== Filmography ==
=== Film ===
Year	Title	Role	Notes
1956	Frontier Woman	Prewitt	
1962	The Music Man	Oscar Jackson	Uncredited
1963	The Courtship of Eddie's Father	Camp Counselor	Uncredited
1965	Village of the Giants	Deputy	Son Ron also starred
1965	The Desert Raven	Reggie	
1966	An Eye for an Eye	Harry	
1967	Gentle Giant	Tater Coughlin	
1967	Cool Hand Luke	Sheriff	Uncredited
1969	Old Paint	Cowboy	Short film
1970	The Wild Country	Cleve	Uncredited
1972	Bloody Trail	Jake	
1973	Salty	—N/a	
1974	Where the Lilies Bloom	Roy Luther	
1974	Chinatown	Irate Farmer	
1976	Eat My Dust!	Clark	
1977	The Legend of Frank Woods	Howard Blacker	
1977	Heroes	Veteran's Hospital Orderly	
1977	Grand Theft Auto	Ned Slinker	Directed by Ron Howard
1977	Another Man, Another Chance	Wagonmaster	
1978	The Amazing Mr. No Legs	Lou's Sidekick	
1981	Smokey Bites the Dust	Coach	
1983	Love Letters	Joseph Chesley	
1983	Forever and Beyond	Technician	
1984	The Lonely Guy	Minister	
1984	Splash	McCollough	Directed by Ron Howard
1985	Cocoon	St. Petersburg Detective	Directed by Ron Howard
1985	Creator	Mr. Spencer	
1986	Gung Ho	Mayor Conrad Zwart	Directed by Ron Howard
1987	Innerspace	Supermarket Customer #1	
1988	Dark Before Dawn	Logan	
1989	Trust Me	Vern	
1989	The 'Burbs	Detective #2	
1989	Listen to Me	Tucker's Father	
1989	Parenthood	Dean at College	Directed by Ron Howard
1989	Merchants of Death	Robert Morrison	
1989	Limit Up	Chuck Feeney	
1991	9 1/2 Ninjas!	Ninja Negotiator	
1992	I Don't Buy Kisses Anymore	Elderly Man	
1992	Far and Away	Tomlin	Directed by Ron Howard
1992	Universal Soldier	John Devreux	
1992	Wishman	Det. Sturgis	
1992	Ticks	Sheriff Parker	
1993	Fearless	Bald Cabby	
1993	Ed and His Dead Mother	Rev. Praxton	
1993	Snapdragon	Priest	
1994	Forced to Kill	Rance	
1994	The Paper	Alicia's Doctor	Directed by Ron Howard
1994	The Cowboy Way	Old Gentleman	
1994	Terminal Velocity	Chuck (pilot)	
1994	Ed Wood	Old Man McCoy	
1994	Little Giants	Priest	
1994	Bigfoot: The Unforgettable Encounter	Todd Brandell	
1995	Children of the Corn III: Urban Harvest	Eddie Calhoun	
1995	Savate	Farmer	
1995	Apollo 13	Reverend	Directed by Ron Howard
1996	Sgt. Bilko	Mr. Robbins	
1996	Tiger Heart	Mr. Johnson	
1996	Where Truth Lies	Judge Bloom	
1996	Independence Day	Chaplain	
1996	Mars Attacks!	Texan Investor	
1996	Ghosts of Mississippi	Ralph Hargrove	
1997	Busted	Mayor Davies	
1997	Traveller	Farmer	
1997	Money Talks	Reverend	
1997	The Lay of the Land	Dr. Brown	
1997	Sparkle and Charm	Mr. Houghton	
1998	The Sender	Max	
1998	Chairman of the Board	Rev. Hatley	
1998	Land of the Free	Hotel Manager	
1998	Small Soldiers	Husband	
1998	The Night Caller	Hank	
1998	Evasive Action	Train Engineer	Uncredited
1998	Psycho	Mr. Lowery	
1999	Happy, Texas	Ely	
1999	Malevolence	Dr. Burns	
1999	Abilene	Arliss	
2000	Love & Sex	Earl	
2000	Ping!	Old Man	
2000	Big Wind on Campus	Grandpa Morton	
2000	How the Grinch Stole Christmas	Elderly Timekeeper	Directed by Ron Howard
2001	Joe Dirt	Bomb Squad Cop	
2001	A Crack in the Floor	Floyd Fryed	
2001	Rat Race	Feed the Earth Spokesman	
2001	A Beautiful Mind	White-Haired Patient	Directed by Ron Howard
2002	D-Tox	Geezer	
2002	Legend of the Phantom Rider	Doc Fisher	
2002	Jumping for Joy	—N/a	
2002	Leaving the Land	Uncle Solomon	
2003	The Long Ride Home	Old man	
2003	Ghost Rock	Cash	
2003	The Missing	Telegraph Operator	Directed by Ron Howard
2004	Death and Texas	Circuit Court Judge	
2004	Toolbox Murders	Chas Rooker	
2004	The Alamo	Governor Smith	
2004	Eulogy	Lance Sommers	
2004	Back by Midnight	Priest	
2005	Cinderella Man	Announcer Al Fazin	Directed by Ron Howard
2005	Killing Cupid	Zeke	
2005	Miracle at Sage Creek	Doctor Babcock	
2006	Sister Aimee: The Aimee Semple McPherson Story	James Kennedy	
2007	Georgia Rule	Dog Bite Man	
2007	Be My Baby	Zippy the Messenger	
2007	Ghost Town	Sheriff Tom Parker	
2007	Walk Hard: The Dewey Cox Story	Preacher	
2008	Grizzly Park	Ranger Howard	
2008	Drillbit Taylor	Older Man	
2008	Keith	Old Man	Uncredited
2008	Audie & the Wolf	Dr. Maleosis	
2008	Frost/Nixon	Ollie	Directed by Ron Howard
2009	Play the Game	Mervin Lavine	
2009	Angels & Demons	Cardinal Beck	Directed by Ron Howard
2009	Within	Deli Owner	
2009	Boppin' at the Glue Factory	Walker Bill	
2010	Valentine's Day	Bistro Gardens Diner	
2010	Bloodworth	Ira	
2010	Yohan: The Child Wanderer	Old Knut	
2010	Once Fallen	Harry	
2010	Jonah Hex	Telegrapher	
2010	The Genesis Code	Dr. Tolley	
2010	The Trial	Judge Danielson	
2011	The Dilemma	Burt	Directed by Ron Howard
2011	Night Club	Chuck	
2011	InSight	Cemetery Presider	
2011	Spooky Buddies	Mr. Joseph Johnson	Direct-to-video
2011	Rosewood Lane	Fred Crumb	
2011	Redemption: For Robbing the Dead	Doctor	
2011	Let Go	Dimples	
2012	Easy Rider: The Ride Back	Andrew Jackson Bennett	
2013	Max Rose	Walter Prewitt	
2013	Nebraska	Uncle Ray	
2013	The Lone Ranger	Engineer	
2013	Richard Rossi 5th Anniversary of Sister Aimee	James Kennedy	
2013	Gone Dark	Charles	
2015	Junction	The Clerk	
2016	40 Nights	Devil as an Old Man	
2016	Kalebegiak	José Mari	
2017	Chasing the Star	Devil as an Old Man	
2017	Broken Memories	Jasper	
2018	Sister Aimee 10th Anniversary	James Kennedy	Posthumous release
2019	The Christ Slayer	Devil as an Old Man	Posthumous release
2019	Apple Seed	Carl	Posthumous release
2019	Dads	Rance Howard	Posthumous release

=== Television ===
Year	Title	Role	Notes
1956; 1957	Kraft Television Theatre	—N/a	3 episodes
1958	How to Marry a Millionaire	Corporal	Episode: "Hit and Run"
1959	Bat Masterson	Fletcher	Episode: "Promised Land"
1962; 1964	Combat!	Wilkerson	Episode: "The Bridge at Chalons"
1962; 1964	The Andy Griffith Show	Bus Driver / First Treasury Agent / Governor's Chauffeur / Party Guest	5 episodes
1966	That Girl	Customer #2	2 episodes
1966	The Virginian	Luka	Episode: "Ride a Cock-Horse to Laramie Cross"
1967	The Monroes	Al	Episode: "Teaching the Tiger to Purr"
1967; 1969	Gentle Ben	Henry Boomhauer	13 episodes
1970	Then Came Bronson	Mr. Carl Mueller	Episode: "That Undiscovered Country..."
1971	Night Gallery	Cameraman	Episode: "The Boy Who Predicted Earthquakes/Miss Lovecraft Sent Me/The Hand of Borgus Weems/Phantom of What Opera?"
1971; 1972	Bonanza	Sam / Bogardus	2 episodes
1973	The F.B.I.	Ranger	Episode: "Desperate Journey"
1973	Kung Fu	Sheriff Byrd	Episode: "The Hoots"
1973; 1975	The Waltons	Dr. McIvers	5 episodes
1974	Gunsmoke	Frank Benton	2 episodes
1976; 1979	Happy Days	Announcer / Ben Wilson / Mr. Burkhart	3 episodes
1977	Little House on the Prairie	Simpson	Episode: "Quarantine"
1978	Battlestar Galactica	Farnes	Episode: "The Magnificent Warriors"
1978	Cotton Candy	Mr. Bremmercamp	Also director Television film
1979	Laverne & Shirley	Doctor	Episode: "Who's Papa?"
1981	Mork & Mindy	Guard	Episode: "Mork Meets Robin Williams"
1983	The Thorn Birds	Doctor	Episode: "Part 3"
1984	Dynasty	Gifford	Episode: "The Voice: Part 2"
1985	The Long Hot Summer	Wilk	Television film
1986	A Smoky Mountain Christmas	Doctor	Television film
1986	Return To Mayberry	Preacher	Made for TV Movie
1989; 1992	Baywatch	Fireman / Joe	2 episodes
1991	Lucy & Desi: Before the Laughter	Bernie	Television film
1993	Coach	Herman Van Dam	Episode: "Christmas of the Van Damned"
1993; 1996	Seinfeld	Blind Man / Farmer	Episode: The Glasses and The Bottle Deposit
1994	Diagnosis: Murder	Driver	Episode: "Murder with Mirrors"
1995	Problem Child 3: Junior in Love	The Janitor	Television film
1996; 1997	Babylon 5	David Sheridan	3 episodes
1996; 1997	Married... with Children	Edwin / Reverend	2 episodes
1996	Melrose Place	Motel Manager	Episode: "Full Metal Betsy"
1997	Beyond Belief: Fact or Fiction	Reginald Hannon	Episode: "The Viewing/The Subway/Kid in the Closet/Justice is Served/The Tractor"
1998	Clueless	Mr. Bell	2 episodes
1998	Two of a Kind	Mr. Fillmore	2 episodes
1999	Just Shoot Me!	Blind Flower Guy	Episode: "When Nina Met Elliott"
2000	7th Heaven	Old Man in Park	Episode: "Help!"
2001	Angel	Marcus Roscoe / Angel	Episode: "Carpe Noctem"
2002	That '80s Show	Mr. Bailey	Episode: "Tuesday Comes Over"
2004	Cold Case	Buddie	Episode: "Factory Girls"
2004	That's So Raven	Murphy	Episode: "Sweeps"
2005	Ghost Whisperer	Dirk Abrams	Episode: "Lost Boys"
2006	CSI: NY	Samuel Cooper	Episode: "Fare Game"
2006	Sasquatch Mountain	Harris Zeff	Television film
2009	ER	Dr. Oliver Kostin	Episode: "A Long, Strange Trip"
2009	Lie to Me	Joe Metz	Episode: "Moral Waiver"
2011	Workaholics	Jerry	Episode: "The Strike"
2012	Grey's Anatomy	Martin Carroll	Episode: "The Lion Sleeps Tonight"
2013	NCIS: Los Angeles	Eugene	Episode: "Purity"
2014	Bones	Jerold Norsky	2 episodes
2014	Kroll Show	Dr. Stanley Armond	Episode: "Banff Is on Fire"
2014	Review	Willie	Episode: "Teaching the Tiger to Purr"
2016	The X-Files	Old Man	Episode: "My Struggle"
2018	Arrested Development	Rance Howard	Episode: "Emotional Baggage"; Posthumous release
