= Paige Howard =

American actress (born 1985)

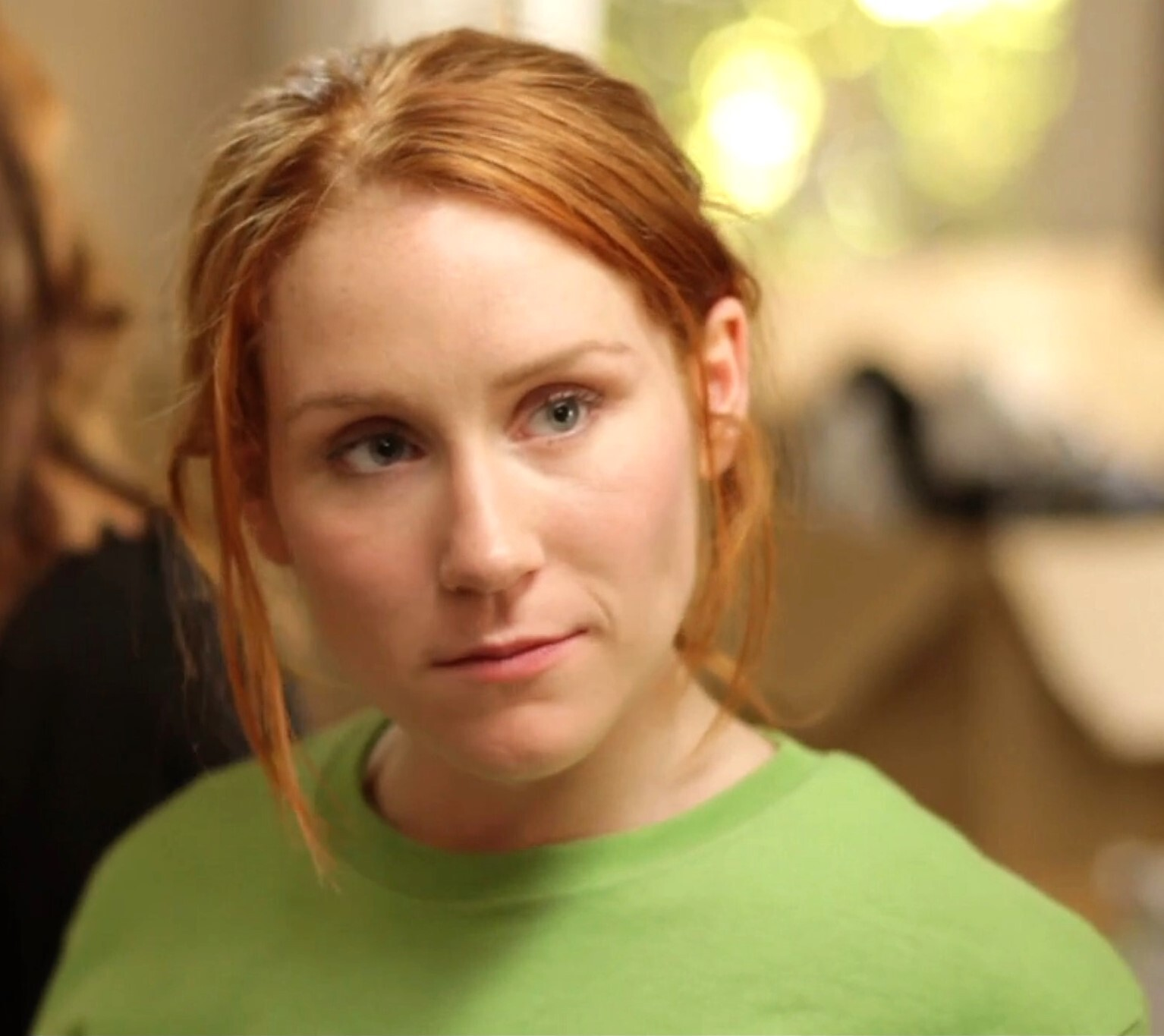
- Howard in 2012 film Cheesecake Casserole
- Born: February 5, 1985 (age 41); Los Angeles, California, U.S.
- Occupation: Actress
- Years active: 2008–present
- Spouse: Tim Abou-Nasr (m. 2022)
- Father: Ron Howard
- Relatives: Bryce Dallas Howard (sister); Clint Howard (uncle); Rance Howard (grandfather); Jean Speegle Howard (grandmother); Seth Gabel (brother-in-law)

Paige Carlyle Howard (born February 5, 1985) is an American actress.

== Early life ==
Paige Carlyle Howard was born on February 5, 1985, in Los Angeles, California to writer Cheryl (née Alley) Howard and actor-director Ron Howard. She has a twin sister Jocelyn Howard, an elder sister, actress Bryce Dallas Howard, and a younger brother. Through her father, Paige is a granddaughter of actors Rance Howard and Jean Speegle Howard, as well as a niece of actor Clint Howard.

== Education ==
Howard attended New York University's Tisch School of the Arts.

== Career ==
Howard made her professional stage debut at the Vineyard Theatre in New York City, playing the title character in J. M. Barrie's play Mary Rose, which was directed by Tina Landau.

After guest-starring roles on TV shows Medium and 90210, Howard made her feature film debut as Sue O’Malley in the 2009 comedy Adventureland. She then followed with a lead role on the web series stalkTALK, and starring roles in the indie comedies Virgin Alexander and Cheesecake Casserole, as well as the psychological thriller The Employer opposite Malcolm McDowell. Howard won Best Supporting Actress at the Los Angeles Movie Awards in 2013 for her role in The Employer.

== Personal life ==
Howard married actor Tim Abou-Nasr on May 1, 2022 in an outdoor ceremony in Central Park. Her father, Ron, officiated and her sister, Bryce, was a bridesmaid.

== Filmography ==
Film roles
Year	Title	Role	Notes
2009	Adventureland	Sue O'Malley	
2011	Virgin Alexander	Ruby	
2012	Cheesecake Casserole	Jess	
2013	The Employer	Sandra Turner	
2020	The Smiler	Wendy	Short
2021	Hollywood.Con	Veronica Lake	

Television roles
Year	Title	Role	Notes
2008	Medium	Myra Edgemont	Episode: "Girls Ain't Nothing But Trouble"
2009	90210	Angela	Episode: "The Dionysian Debacle"
2011	stalkTALK	Natalie Walsh	8 episodes
2018	Arrested Development	Herself	Episode: "Emotional Baggage"
2019	Happy!	Dr. Julie	Episode: "Pervapalooza"
2020–2021	The Astronauts	Matilda (voice)	8 episodes
