= Bryce Dallas Howard =

American actress and director (born 1981)

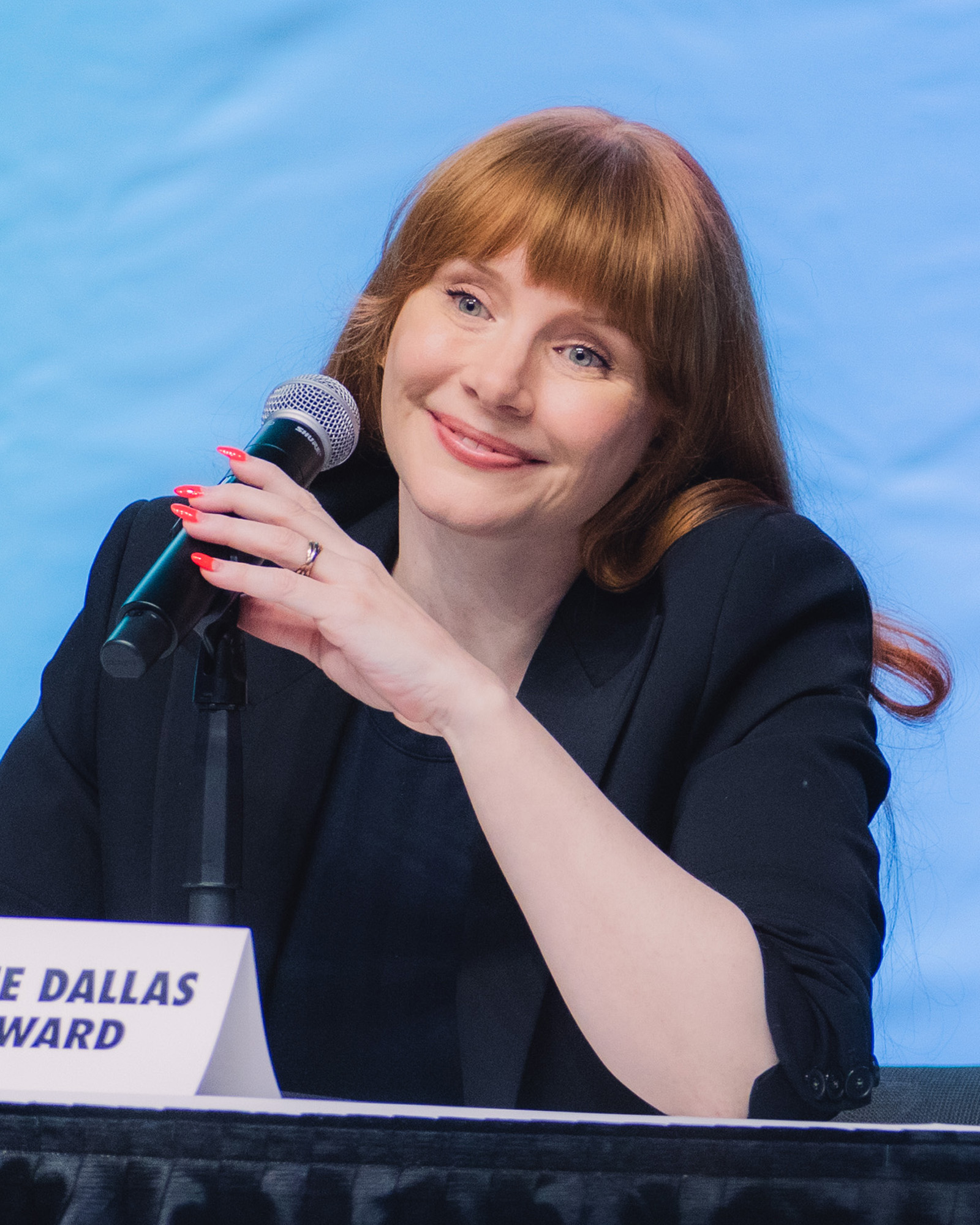
- Howard at the 2025 Los Angeles Comic Con
- Born: March 2, 1981 (age 45); Los Angeles, California, U.S.
- Education: New York University (BFA)
- Occupations: Actress; director
- Years active: 1989–present
- Spouse: Seth Gabel (m. 2006)
- Children: 2
- Father: Ron Howard
- Relatives: Paige Howard (sister); Clint Howard (uncle); Rance Howard (grandfather); Jean Speegle Howard (grandmother)

Signature
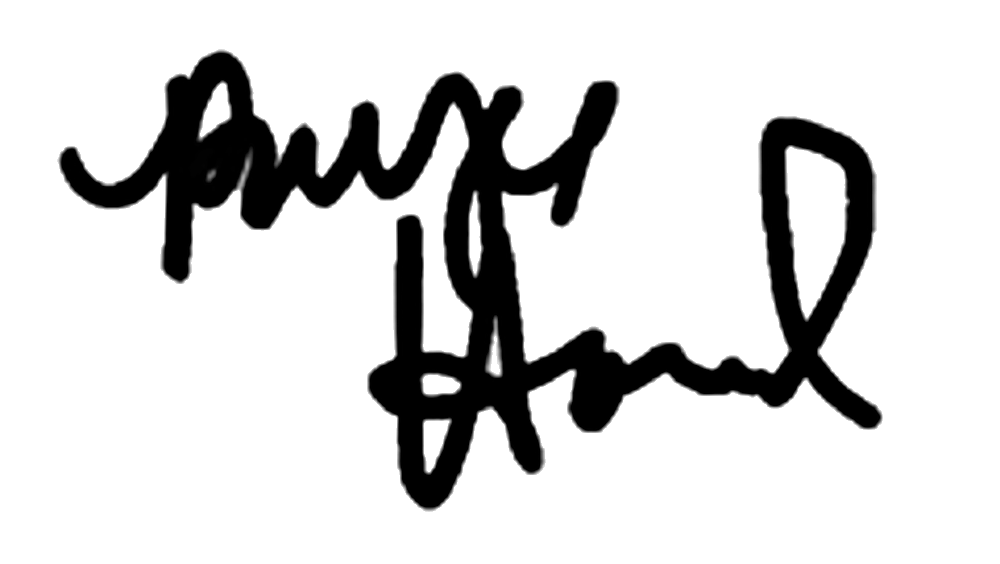

Bryce Dallas Howard (born March 2, 1981) is an American actress and director. The eldest child of the filmmaker Ron Howard, she studied acting at the New York University Tisch School of the Arts. While portraying Rosalind in a 2003 production of As You Like It, Howard caught the attention of the director M. Night Shyamalan, who cast her as a blind woman in the thriller film The Village (2004) and a naiad in the fantasy film Lady in the Water (2006).

Howard's performance in Kenneth Branagh's romance film As You Like It (2006) earned her a Golden Globe Award nomination and she subsequently appeared as Gwen Stacy in Sam Raimi's superhero film Spider-Man 3 (2007). She went on to appear as Kate Connor in the action film Terminator Salvation (2009) and as Victoria in the fantasy film The Twilight Saga: Eclipse (2010). She also appeared in the drama film The Help (2011), the comedy-drama film 50/50 (2011), the fantasy film Pete's Dragon (2016), and the musical film Rocketman (2019). Howard gained further recognition with her role as Claire Dearing in the top-grossing Jurassic World trilogy (2015–2022).

Additionally, Howard directed the documentary film Dads (2019), and episodes of the Disney+ space western series The Mandalorian (2019–2023) and The Book of Boba Fett (2022).

== Early life and education ==
Bryce Dallas Howard was born March 2, 1981, in Los Angeles, to the writer Cheryl Howard (née Alley) and the actor-director Ron Howard. She has two younger sisters, including Paige, and a younger brother. Through her father, Bryce is a granddaughter of actors Rance Howard and Jean Speegle Howard, as well as a niece of actor Clint Howard. Her godfather is actor Henry Winkler, who co-starred with her father in the 1970s–1980s American comedy television series Happy Days.

Howard was raised in Armonk, New York, and on a farm in Greenwich, Connecticut. At the age of seven, she was permitted to be an extra in her father's films. In a 2017 appearance on Watch What Happens Live with Andy Cohen, she said she and her siblings were babysat by family friend Tom Cruise on several occasions.

Howard began training as an actress at Stagedoor Manor, a performing arts camp in upstate New York, alongside Natalie Portman. She attended Greenwich Country Day School until 1996, and graduated from Byram Hills High School in 1999, after which she studied for three years at New York University's (NYU) Tisch School of the Arts, taking classes at the Stella Adler Studio of Acting, the Experimental Theatre Wing, and the International Theatre Workshop in Amsterdam. During her schooling, Howard took part in the concept recording of the Broadway-bound musical A Tale of Two Cities. She took a leave of absence from NYU to pursue roles without completing her degree. Almost 20 years later, she returned to NYU and completed her degree in 2020.

Howard is also an alumna of the Steppenwolf Theatre Company's School in Chicago, and of The Actors Center in New York City. During her time in New York, Howard was also a member of Theater Mitu, a company that was in residence at New York Theatre Workshop, which is known for its exploration of theatrical forms.

== Career ==
=== 2002–2006: Early roles and film success ===
For several years, Howard appeared in New York City theatrical productions; her repertoire included House & Garden–a 2002 Alan Ayckbourn production held at the Manhattan Theatre Club– and Tartuffe, a theatrical comedy staged at the American Airlines Theatre. In 2003, Howard performed as Rosalind in the William Shakespeare comedy As You Like It at The Public Theater, where she caught the attention of film director M. Night Shyamalan, who two weeks later and without an audition, cast her in his fantasy thriller The Village (2004). Howard portrayed the female lead Ivy, the chief's blind daughter, opposite Ivy's love interest Joaquin Phoenix. The film was a commercial success but met mixed reviews. Her performance was lauded by critics and Howard was nominated for several awards. Lars von Trier then cast Howard to replace Nicole Kidman in Manderlay (2005), the sequel to Dogville (2003); she reprised Kidman's role as Grace Mulligan, an idealistic woman who stays at a plantation in rural Alabama and later attempts to assist a revolt against slave owners. The film garnered mixed reviews.

Howard reunited with Shyamalan for Lady in the Water (2006), a fantasy drama in which she plays Story, a naiad-like being from a bedtime story, opposite Paul Giamatti, a Philadelphia building superintendent who discovers Story in a pool. The film under-performed at the box office, failed to recoup its budget, and was largely panned by critics. Howard again portrayed Rosalind in Kenneth Branagh's 2006 film adaptation of Shakespeare's As You Like It, which was released theatrically in Europe before premiering on HBO in the United States. The film was negatively received by British media but American press coverage was positive. Howard was nominated for a Golden Globe Award for Best Actress – Miniseries or Television Film at the 65th Golden Globe Awards for her role. That year, she wrote and directed a short film called Orchids as part of Glamour magazine's "Reel Moments" series, which was funded by Cartier and FilmAid International.

=== 2007–2014: Rise to prominence and critical acclaim ===
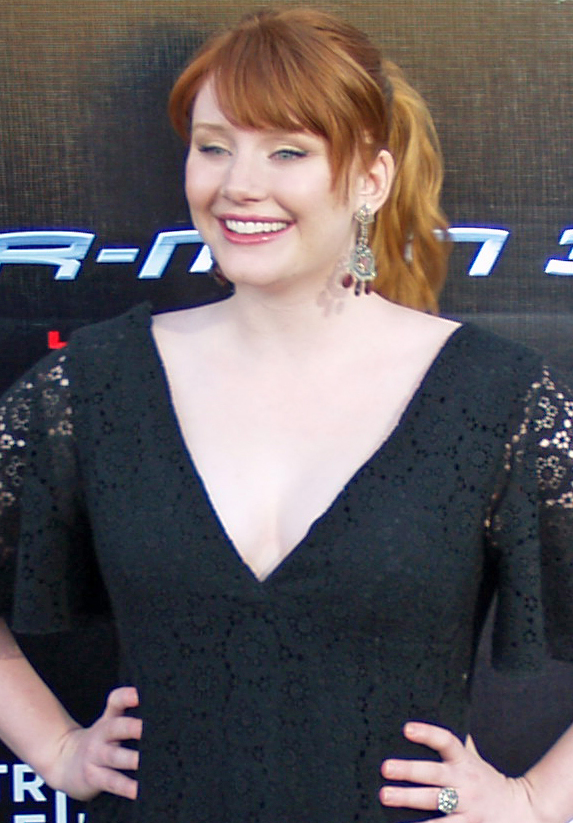
Howard at the premiere of Spider-Man 3 in 2007

In 2007, Howard starred in her first blockbuster film, portraying Gwen Stacy in the superhero film Spider-Man 3. Howard described herself as a "huge fan" of the franchise and did extensive research to prepare for the role, including reading comic books and dyeing her hair blonde for the part. Howard performed many of her own stunts while filming, unaware she was a few months into a pregnancy. The film was the highest-grossing installment of the trilogy and received a mixed reception. Howard then starred in the science fiction film Terminator Salvation (2009); she replaced Claire Danes in the role of Kate Connor. Howard described her role as "an emotional sounding board" for other characters. The film was a financial success but was not critically well received. The Guardian described Howard's role as "winsomely" while The New York Times wrote she "upholds the maternal side of the original Sarah Connor legacy".

Howard starred as a reluctant debutante opposite Chris Evans in The Loss of a Teardrop Diamond (2009), an independent film that is based on a 1957 screenplay by Tennessee Williams and premiered at the Toronto International Film Festival. Kirk Honeycutt of The Hollywood Reporter praised Howard's "eye-catching performance", describing her as a "must-see", while Roger Ebert of the Chicago Sun-Times called her performance "affecting" but not "electrifying, because the material doesn't have it". She joined the Twilight series' third installment The Twilight Saga: Eclipse, replacing Rachelle Lefevre as Victoria Sutherland, a revenge-seeking vampire. Howard was a fan of the book series and expressed admiration for her character. The film was a box office hit and drew mixed reviews, though Howard's performance received critical acclaim; Honeycutt lauded her as "the epitome of sensual, feline cunning".

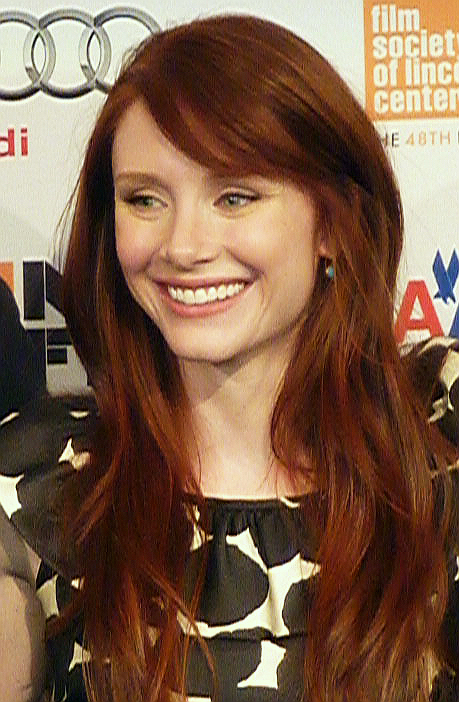
Howard attending an event for Hereafter at the 2010 New York Film Festival

Howard appeared in Clint Eastwood's Hereafter (2010) as a love interest of Matt Damon's character. Empire referred to her character as "twinkly", and stated Howard's and Damon's "fine work" uplift the film. Hereafter was a commercial hit but critics gave it a mixed reception. In January 2011, Howard became the first celebrity ambassador for designer Kate Spade. She appeared in Tate Taylor's 2011 film adaptation of Kathryn Stockett's novel The Help, in which she played Hilly Holbrook, a racist socialite who leads a Junior League chapter in 1963 Jackson, Mississippi. The film was a critical and commercial success. The Miami Herald described her role as a "broadly comic villain" while The New York Times praised Howard for being "energetic in a thankless role". Howard was nominated for numerous accolades, including an MTV Movie Award and an NAACP Image Award, winning a Critics' Choice Award and a Screen Actors Guild Award alongside the rest of the cast.

Howard, alongside her father, produced Gus Van Sant's Restless (2011), a dark coming-of-age film about a teenage boy and girl who are engrossed with death. Howard offered considerable input on the film's screenwriting and directorial choices. It premiered at the Cannes Film Festival to mixed reviews. She portrayed Joseph Gordon-Levitt's on-and-off girlfriend in the cancer dramedy 50/50 (2011). The film premiered at the Toronto International Film Festival to critical acclaim and was nominated for the Golden Globe Award for Best Motion Picture – Musical or Comedy. The New York Times stated Howard "makes a real character" out of the "shrewish" role while Los Angeles Times wrote she was "rapidly becoming today's preeminent Queen of Mean". Howard directed the short film When You Find Me, a social film that was developed in collaboration with Canon under the premise of gathering inspiration through images selected from a photography contest. 96,362 entries were accepted while only eight were selected for use in the film.

=== 2015–present: Mainstream recognition and professional expansion ===
In 2015, Howard starred opposite Chris Pratt, in the science fiction action film Jurassic World, the fourth installment in the Jurassic Park franchise. She portrayed Claire Dearing, the ambitious, accomplished operations manager at the titular theme park who undergoes development during the film. Howard performed extensive ankle exercises to complete the scenes in which her character runs in high heels through almost three feet (0.91 m) of mud, which she described as "one of the hardest things [she's] ever had to do". Jurassic World was a commercial and critical success, with Howard's performance and on-screen chemistry with Pratt receiving praise. Rolling Stone described her portrayal as "dynamo" and "nobody's patsy" while the Associated Press wrote; "it is Howard who makes the biggest impact ... her transformation is the most convincing one in a film full of dubious evolutions". The Los Angeles Times and The Atlantic considered Dearing and her use of heels "sexist", while Bustle and Inquisitr labeled Howard's character as a "feminist hero". Howard disagreed with the former view, citing the character's detachment from reality and extensive familiarity with heels in everyday life. Reports stated that Howard was paid $2 million less than Pratt, who earned $10 million, but she stated that the gap was even larger and that she was paid more for other Jurassic World-related things like video games and theme park rides.

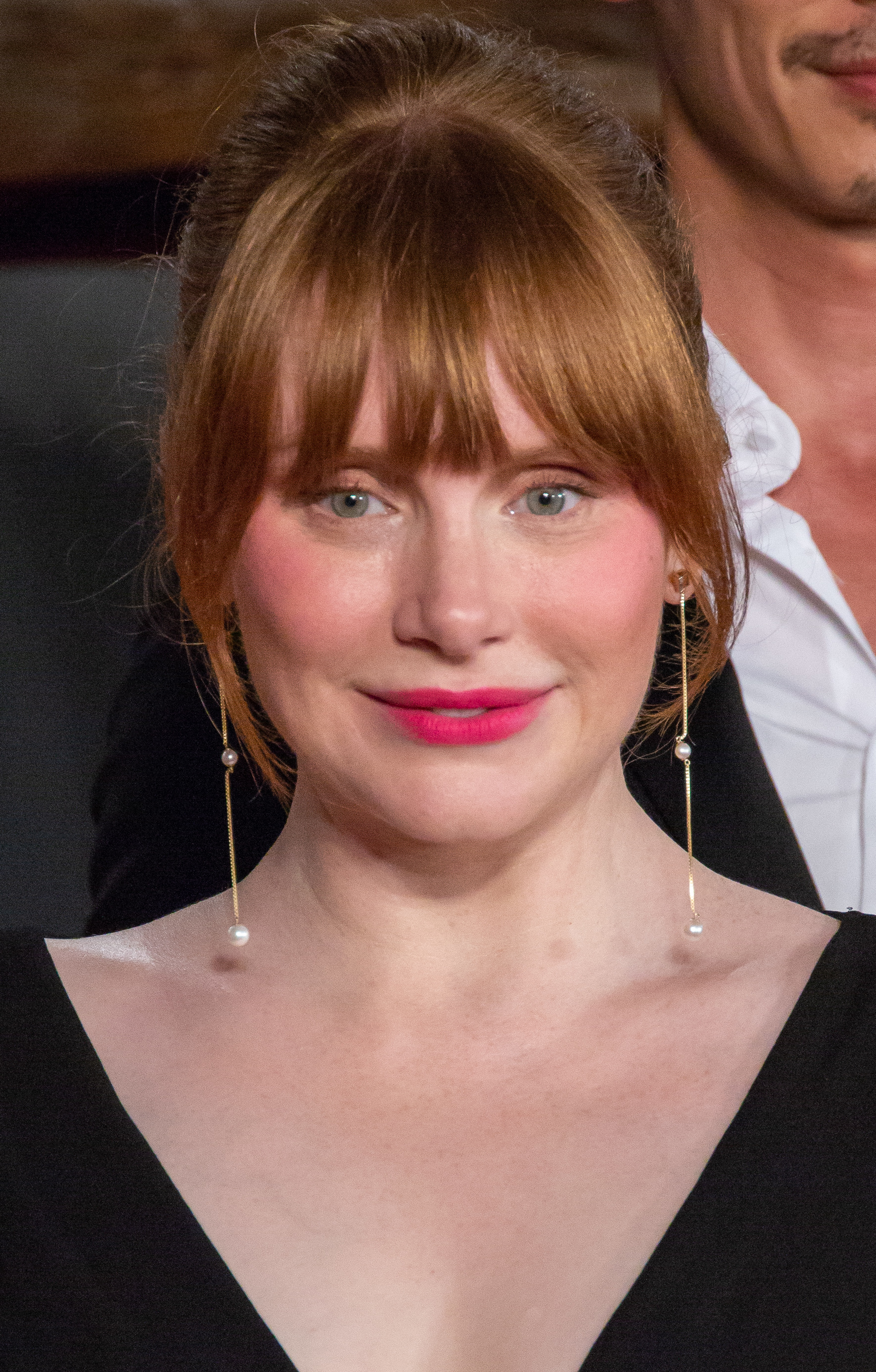
Howard in 2018

In 2016, Howard starred in the fantasy adventure film Pete's Dragon, a remake of the 1977 film of the same name. Pete's Dragon was released to critical and commercial success. The same year, Howard appeared in the crime drama Gold (2016) as Kay, the protagonist's girlfriend. Gold opened to a limited release with mixed reviews. The Hollywood Reporter dubbed her portrayal a "sturdy, salt-of-the-earth" type who "makes [a substantial] impression". That same year, she also appeared in "Nosedive", an episode of the Netflix science fiction anthology series Black Mirror. Howard gained 30 pounds for the role because body shaming is a "huge part of the subtext of the story". She chose a laugh for Lacie, her character, that she meant to connote artificiality, anxiety, and dejection. Both Howard and the episode received critical praise; The Guardian lauded her portrayal as "brilliantly played" and The Atlantic wrote "Howard's performance is terrific–she conveys Lacie's inner frustration while grinning cheerfully through it". Howard received a Screen Actors Guild Award nomination for her performance.

Howard reprised her role as Dearing in the second film of the Jurassic World trilogy, Jurassic World: Fallen Kingdom (2018), in which her character appears as a dinosaur-rights activist. The film was a commercial hit, although it received mixed critical reception. For accuracy, Howard trained with a veterinary surgeon who had experience with African wildlife. Variety stated Howard "projects a luminous concern for God's ancient revived creatures" while Empire praised both Pratt and Howard for "develop[ing] their characters beyond the archetypes they inhabited".

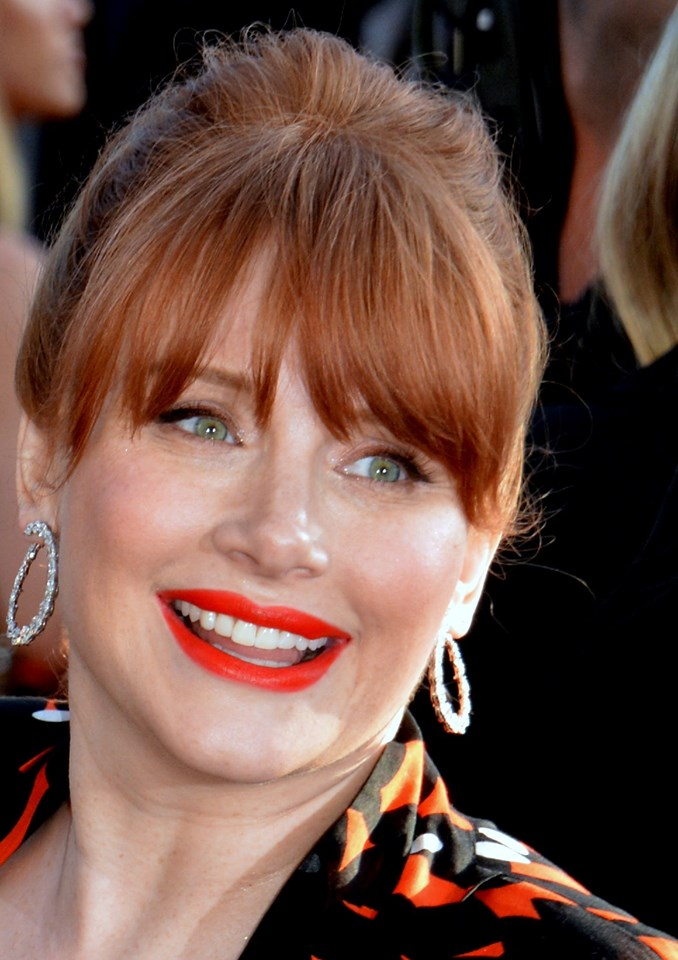
Howard attending the premiere of Rocketman at the 2019 Cannes Film Festival

In 2019, Howard voiced the character Bella in the family drama film A Dog's Way Home, which opened to critical and commercial success. Howard appeared as Elton John's mother Sheila Dwight in the musical biopic Rocketman (2019), which was directed by Dexter Fletcher. Howard described her character as humorous and sharp-witted, and as someone who struggled with her mental health. Howard worked extensively with make-up artists to design the character's look as she aged, and used Elizabeth Taylor as inspiration for her portrayal. Rocketman was a box-office hit and garnered critical acclaim, receiving a nomination for the Golden Globe Award for Best Motion Picture – Musical or Comedy. The Chicago Sun-Times praised Howard for her "finely nuanced work" and CinemaBlend called her performance a "wicked portrayal ... that really ties a film together".

Howard made her feature film directorial debut with the documentary Dads, which premiered at the 2019 Toronto International Film Festival, where it was named second runner-up for the People's Choice Award for Documentaries. Dads received critical acclaim; Variety wrote; "Howard favors observation over lecture, anecdotes over numbers, showing instead of telling what equally split primary-caregiving looks like in contemporary households" and The Guardian said the film "mixes the platitudinous with the genuinely moving".

She directed three episodes of the Disney+ space Western series The Mandalorian (2019–2023). Howard referred to the larger Star Wars universe as an asset to storytelling, and sought to maintain character depth and appeal to viewers. Howard's direction received positive responses; Den of Geek said she "[made] the episode pop" and "knows what makes Star Wars tick". Howard also directed an episode of the miniseries The Book of Boba Fett, which premiered on Disney+ in January 2022.

Howard reprised her role as Claire Dearing once more in the Jurassic World Dominion (2022), the concluding instalment in the Jurassic World trilogy. The film received mostly negative reviews but was a box office success and brought back Sam Neill, Laura Dern, and Jeff Goldblum, the stars of the original 1993 film. In 2024, she starred in the lead role of the action comedy film Argylle, directed by Matthew Vaughn. She directed episode 6 of the Disney+ science fiction series Star Wars: Skeleton Crew and will direct two episodes of Star Wars: Ahsoka season 2.

In 2025, Howard directed her second documentary film Pets, released during National Pets Day. Howard starred in the 2025 Amazon Prime Video comedy film Deep Cover.

== Personal life ==
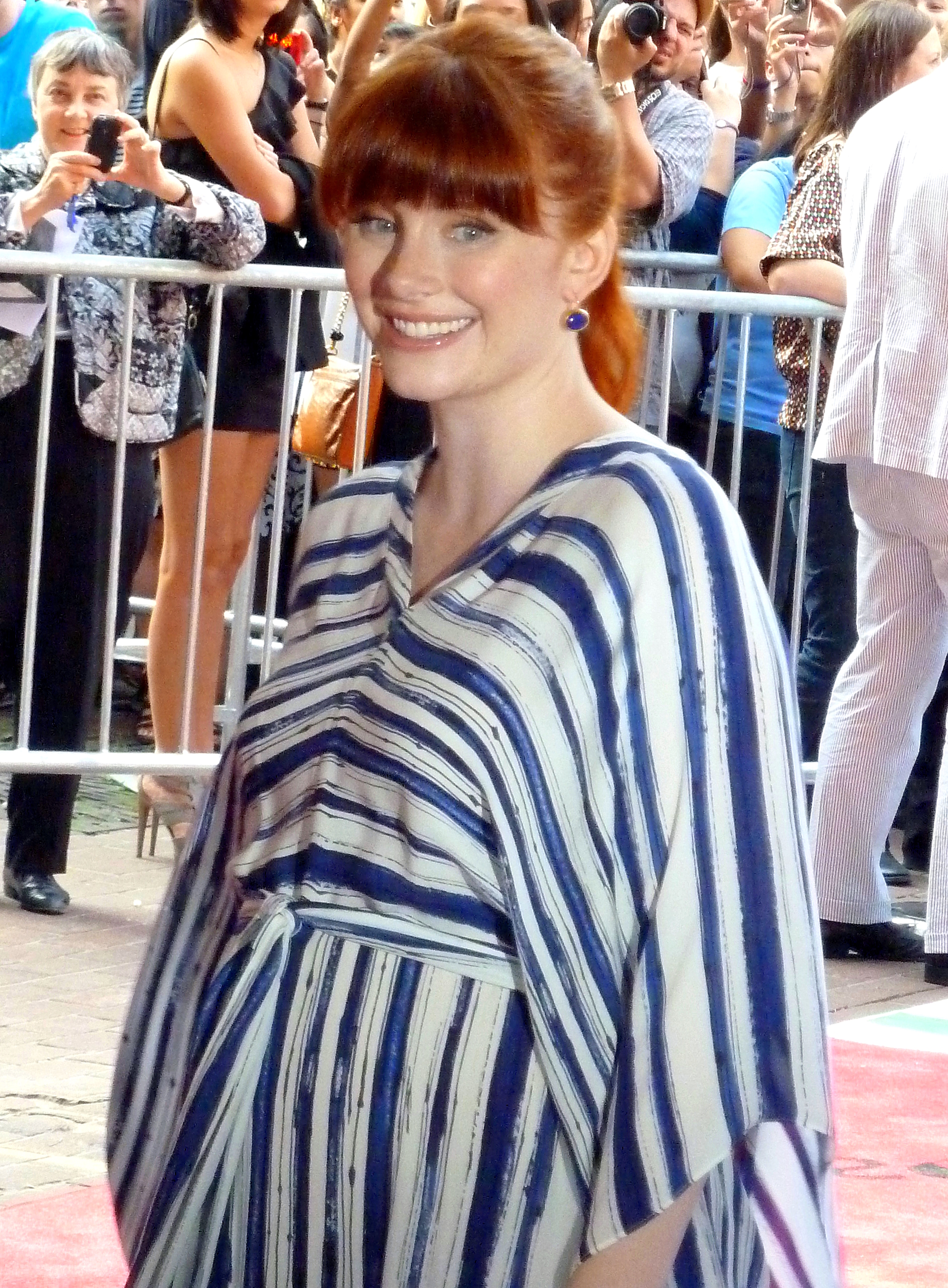
Howard attending the 2011 Toronto International Film Festival while pregnant with her daughter

During her senior year of high school, Howard learned of existentialism. She said: "I was like, 'This is it! This is my religion.' I had never felt a connection to any sort of spirituality before that. It was very basic–you're responsible for the choices that you make–but it was mind-blowing at the time." She does not drink alcohol.

Howard met actor Seth Gabel at New York University; they dated for five years before marrying on June 17, 2006. Howard and Gabel had planned to start a family together in their thirties but a week after their wedding, when they were both around 25 years old, Howard learned she was pregnant with their first child. Howard gave birth to their son in 2007. Howard has talked about experiencing postpartum depression for 18 months after her son's birth, and credited her recovery to the help of a physician and a therapist. The couple had a second child, a daughter, in 2012. The family lives in upstate New York. They are close friends with Josh Gad, who is godfather to their children.

== Filmography ==
Key
†	Denotes works that have not yet been released

=== Film ===
Year	Title	Role	Notes
1989	Parenthood	Strawberry-Blonde Girl in Audience	
1995	Apollo 13	Girl in Yellow Dress	
2000	How the Grinch Stole Christmas	Surprised Who	Credited as Bryce Howard
2001	A Beautiful Mind	Harvard Student	
2004	Book of Love	Heather	
2004	The Village	Ivy Elizabeth Walker	
2005	Manderlay	Grace Margaret Mulligan	
2006	As You Like It	Rosalind	
2006	Lady in the Water	Story	
2006	Orchids	—N/a	Short film; director and co-writer
2007	Spider-Man 3	Gwen Stacy	
2008	Good Dick	Kissing Woman	Cameo
2008	The Loss of a Teardrop Diamond	Fisher Willow	
2009	Terminator Salvation	Katherine "Kate" Brewster Connor	
2010	The Twilight Saga: Eclipse	Victoria	
2010	Despair	Woman	Short film
2010	Hereafter	Melanie	
2011	The Help	Hilly Holbrook	
2011	50/50	Rachael	
2011	Restless	—N/a	Producer
2011	When You Find Me	—N/a	Short film; director
2013	Call Me Crazy: A Five Film	—N/a	Television film; director (segment: "Lucy")
2014	The Lion's Mouth Opens	Herself	Short documentary
2015	Paints Suits	Karen Peltraske	Short film
2015	Jurassic World	Claire Dearing	
2015	Solemates	—N/a	Short film; director and writer
2016	Pete's Dragon	Grace Meacham	
2016	Gold	Kay	
2018	Jurassic World: Fallen Kingdom	Claire Dearing	
2019	A Dog's Way Home	Bella (voice)	
2019	Rocketman	Sheila Eileen	
2019	Love, Antosha	Herself	Documentary
2019	Dads	—N/a	Documentary; director
2022	Jurassic World Dominion	Claire Dearing	
2024	Argylle	Elly Conway / Rachel Kylle	
2025	Pets	—N/a	Documentary; director
2025	Deep Cover	Kat Bryant	
2027	Anything but Ghosts †		Post-production

=== Television ===
Year	Title	Role	Notes
2009	Family Guy	Various voices	Episode: "We Love You, Conrad"
2014	HitRecord on TV	Various	2 episodes
2016	Black Mirror	Lacie Pound	Episode: "Nosedive"
2018	Arrested Development	Herself	Episode: "Emotional Baggage"
2019–2023	The Mandalorian	—N/a	Director; episodes: "Chapter 4: Sanctuary"; "Chapter 11: The Heiress", "Chapter 22: Guns for Hire"
2022	The Book of Boba Fett	—N/a	Director; episode: "Chapter 5: Return of the Mandalorian"
2022	Tales of the Jedi	Yaddle (voice)	Episode: "The Sith Lord"
2024	Star Wars: Skeleton Crew	—N/a	Director; episode: "Zero Friends Again"
2027	Ahsoka	—N/a	Director; 2 episodes for future second season

=== Video games ===
Year	Title	Voice role
2015	Lego Jurassic World	Claire Dearing
2015	Lego Dimensions	Claire Dearing
2018	Jurassic World Evolution	Claire Dearing
2021	Maquette	Kenzie
2021	Jurassic World Evolution 2	Claire Dearing

=== Theatre ===
Year	Title	Role	Venue
2003	Tartuffe	Mariane	American Airlines Theatre

=== Music videos ===
Year	Title	Artist(s)	Role	Notes
2013	"Claudia Lewis"	M83	—N/a	Director
2024	"Electric Energy"	Ariana DeBose, Boy George and Nile Rodgers	Herself	

=== Audiobooks ===
Year	Title	Voice role
2019	The Testaments	Agnes

== Awards and nominations ==
Year	Association	Category	Work	Result	Ref.
2005	Online Film Critics Society	Best Breakthrough Performance	The Village	Nominated	
2005	Palm Springs International Film Festival	Rising Star Award	The Village	Won	
2005	Empire Awards	Best Actress	The Village	Nominated	
2005	Empire Awards	Best Newcomer	The Village	Nominated	
2005	MTV Movie Awards	Best Breakthrough Female	The Village	Nominated	
2005	Teen Choice Awards	Choice Movie: Scary Scene	The Village	Nominated	
2006	Robert Awards	Best Actress in a Leading Role	Manderlay	Nominated	
2008	Golden Globe Awards	Best Actress – Miniseries or Television Film	As You Like It	Nominated	
2010	Teen Choice Awards	Choice Movie Actress: Action	Terminator Salvation	Nominated	
2011	MTV Movie Awards	Best Fight (shared with Xavier Samuel and Robert Pattinson)	The Twilight Saga: Eclipse	Won	
2011	Teen Choice Awards	Choice Movie: Villain	The Twilight Saga: Eclipse	Nominated	
2011	Black Reel Awards	Best Ensemble	The Help	Won	
2011	Broadcast Film Critics Association	Best Ensemble	The Help	Won	
2011	Detroit Film Critics Society	Best Ensemble	The Help	Nominated	
2011	Hollywood Film Festival	Ensemble of the Year	The Help	Won	
2011	Awards Circuit Community Awards	Best Cast Ensemble	The Help	Won	
2011	Black Film Critics Circle Awards	Best Ensemble	The Help	Won	
2011	Hollywood Film Awards	Ensemble of the Year	The Help	Won	
2011	National Board of Review	Best Acting by an Ensemble	The Help	Won	
2012	Central Ohio Film Critics Association	Best Ensemble	The Help	Nominated	
2012	Gold Derby Awards	Best Ensemble Cast	The Help	Won	
2012	MTV Movie Awards	Best Cast (shared with Emma Stone, Viola Davis, Jessica Chastain, and Octavia Spencer)	The Help	Nominated	
2012	MTV Movie Awards	Best Jaw Dropping Moment	The Help	Nominated	
2012	MTV Movie Awards	Best Villain	The Help	Nominated	
2012	NAACP Image Awards	Outstanding Supporting Actress	The Help	Nominated	
2012	San Diego Film Critics Society	Best Performance by an Ensemble	The Help	Nominated	
2012	Satellite Awards	Best Cast – Motion Picture	The Help	Won	
2012	Screen Actors Guild Awards	Outstanding Performance by a Cast in a Motion Picture	The Help	Won	
2012	Washington D.C. Area Film Critics Association	Best Ensemble	The Help	Nominated	
2012	Women Film Critics Circle	Best Ensemble	The Help	Won	
2015	Teen Choice Awards	Choice Movie: Hissy Fit	Jurassic World	Nominated	
2015	Teen Choice Awards	Choice Summer Movie Star: Female	Jurassic World	Nominated	
2015	Women Film Critics Circle Awards	Worst Female Images in a Movie	Jurassic World	Won	
2016	EDA Awards	Actress Most in Need of a New Agent	Jurassic World	Nominated	
2016	Huading Awards	Best Global Actress in a Motion Picture	Jurassic World	Won	
2016	Critics' Choice Movie Awards	Best Actress in an Action Movie	Jurassic World	Nominated	
2016	Hollywood Film Awards	Ensemble of the Year	Gold	Won	
2017	Saturn Awards	Best Supporting Actress	Gold	Nominated	
2017	Screen Actors Guild Awards	Outstanding Performance by a Female Actor in a Television Movie or Miniseries	Black Mirror	Nominated	
2017	Gold Derby Awards	Best Miniseries/TV Movie Actress	Black Mirror	Nominated	
2018	Teen Choice Awards	Choice Summer Movie Star: Female	Jurassic World: Fallen Kingdom	Won	
2018	People's Choice Awards	Favorite Female Movie Star	Jurassic World: Fallen Kingdom	Nominated	
2019	Hasty Pudding Theatricals Awards	Woman of the Year	Herself	Won	
2023	EDA Awards	She Deserves a New Agent Award	Jurassic World Dominion	Nominated	
2023	Golden Raspberry Awards	Worst Actress	Jurassic World Dominion	Nominated	
2024	Golden Raspberry Awards	Worst Actress	Argylle	Nominated	
