= Nobody Gets Out Alive =

- DVD cover
- Directed by: Jason Christopher
- Written by: Jason Christopher
- Produced by: Roy Koriakin
- Starring: Nikki Bell; Jen Dance; Chris Ready; Clint Howard; Matthew Nadu; Chelsey Garner; Brian Gallagher; David J. Bonner; Shaun Paul Costello
- Cinematography: Joseph Hennigan
- Edited by: Matthew Lauyer; Jason Christopher
- Music by: Gene Micofsky
- Production companies: Kphat Productions; Imagination Worldwide; Team Spontaneous Pictures
- Distributed by: Image Entertainment
- Release dates: October 27, 2012 (Detroit); February 26, 2013 (United States; DVD)
- Running time: 77 minutes
- Country: United States
- Language: English

Nobody Gets Out Alive (also known as Down the Road) is a 2012 American horror film written and directed by Jason Christopher.

== Plot ==
While driving drunk through Braiden County in the winter of 2000, two teenagers accidentally run over twelve-year-old Angela Isth, an act witnessed by her father, Hunter. Hunter disappeared, and rumors spread that he went violently insane, and took up residence in Braiden Woods.

Years later, depressed teenager Jenn is a released from a psychiatric hospital into the care of her parents, who convince Jenn to go on a camping trip with her friends (Michael, Michelle, Danny, Angie, Deron, and Jared) to Braiden Woods. As the group makes its way to the campgrounds, they are warned of danger by a vagrant, and someone kills the proprietors of a store. That night, while everyone else is in their tents, Jared goes off to urinate, and stabbed to death by the person who murdered the shopkeepers. The next day, the others go looking for Jared, and while they are gone the killer trashes their campsite, and sabotages the vehicle. While her friends are trying to get the car to start, Angie is captured, thrown onto the hood, and has her neck snapped. As the others run off into the woods, Danny's head is bashed in with a sledgehammer.

Michelle and Michael are attacked and taken to a cabin, where they are tortured, and Michelle is made to watch as Michael has a nail hammered into his head by the madman, who is revealed to be Hunter. Hunter rants about his wife (who died giving birth) and daughter, and kills Michelle with a saw, and a brick. Jenn and Deron stumble onto Hunter's house, and the lunatic goes after them with a sledgehammer. While Hunter is preoccupied with murdering Deron, Jenn makes it to a road, and flags down a car, only for Hunter to appear and bludgeon the driver.

Jenn is chased back into Braiden Woods, where Hunter catches up to her. As he strangles her, Jenn pulls a knife out of Hunter's belt, and stabs him with it. At sunrise, Jenn is found on the side of the road by a motorist, who promises to help her, though a brief shot reveals a pair of hammers similar to Hunter's in the backseat.

A post-credits scene shows Jenn back in the psychiatric hospital, where a doctor takes her to her room.

== Cast ==
- Jen Dance as Jenn
- David J. Bonner as Deron
- Shaun Paul Costello as Michael
- Chelsey Garner as Michelle
- Matthew Nadu as Danny
- Chris Ready as Jared
- Nikki Bell as Angie
- Brian Gallagher as Hunter Isth
- Clint Howard as Doctor Owen
- Noam Harary as Brandon
- Joe Garrifo as Tim
- Ray Mamrak as Scary Man
- Patrick Michael as Harold
- Ann Wood as Ethna
- Zowie-Ella Mayer as Zowie
- Diane Backos as Jenn's Mother
- Lou Pacheco as Jenn's Father
- Chuck Conners as Party Guy
- Jennifer Merritt as Party Girl
- Lexi Monteleon as Angela Isth
- Chris Lobascio as Friendly Driver
- Justin Clarke as Driver
- Eddie Ockmanski as Police Officer

== Reception ==
A 3/5 was awarded by Dread Central, which praised the cinematography, score, and Brian Gallagher's performance, though it was also critical of the editing, and the other actors. Daryl Loomis of DVD Verdict wrote, "Nobody Gets Out Alive makes no bones about its roots and straddles the line between the good and bad sides of homage" and "as a consequence, the final result is decidedly imperfect". Despite criticizing the lack of suspense, and "poor performances, editing flubs, and weird shot framing" the reviewer still admitted Nobody Gets Out Alive was "not all bad" and "the film's heart is in the right place". Horror News's Lea Lawrynowicz stated, "Despite its endless barrage of recycled plot devices, Nobody Gets Out Alive (aka Down the Road) has one very dubious distinction: it is one of the most awkward horror films I have ever seen" with overlong scenes, uneven pacing, hit or miss gore effects, and characters who were often "excruciating" to watch.
