= Ticks (film) =

1993 horror film directed by Tony Randel

- Directed by: Tony Randel
- Written by: Brent V. Friedman
- Produced by: Jack F. Murphy; Gary Schmoeller; Brian Yuzna
- Starring: Rosalind Allen; Ami Dolenz; Seth Green; Virginya Keehne; Ray Oriel; Alfonso Ribeiro; Peter Scolari; Dina Dayrit; Michael Medeiros; Barry Lynch; Clint Howard
- Cinematography: Steve Grass
- Edited by: Leslie Rosenthal
- Music by: Daniel Licht; Christopher L. Stone
- Production companies: First Look Pictures; Republic Pictures
- Distributed by: Republic Pictures
- Release dates: June 4, 1993 (Italy); June 17, 1993 (Netherlands); August 10, 1993 (Baltimore); December 10, 1993 (Philippines)
- Running time: 85 minutes
- Country: United States
- Language: English
- Budget: $1.5 million

Ticks, also known as Infested, is a 1993 direct-to-video horror film directed by Tony Randel and starring Peter Scolari, Seth Green, Rosalind Allen, Ami Dolenz, Alfonso Ribeiro, and Clint Howard.

== Plot ==
Marijuana grower Jarvis Tanner uses an illegal plant steroid to enhance his marijuana crop. A leak in his cobbled together machinery drips the steroid onto a tick nest, causing them to mutate. The mutated ticks are bigger, stronger, faster, and more aggressive.

Meanwhile, Los Angeles resident Tyler Burns is sent by his father to join an at-risk youth program at a camp in the woods, in an attempt to have him conquer his fear of being alone, which was caused by being abandoned in the woods by his drunk father several years before. At the pickup location for the program, Tyler is introduced to his fellow campers: Darrel “Panic” Lumley, Darrel's dog Brutus, Melissa Danson, Kelly Mishimoto, Rome Hernandez, and Dee Dee Davenport. Additionally, there are two counselors: Charles Danson and Holly Lambert.

On the way to camp the van gets a flat tire and when the kids get out of the van to stretch, Darrel finds a tick on Brutus, which Tyler removes and burns. Later, the party stops at a store to get supplies. Melissa is perusing posters outside of the store when she meets two locals, Sir and Jerry. Jerry harasses Melissa, but Sir intervenes and the group gets back on the road.

At the grow operation, Jarvis’ pet hamster is attacked and killed by a mutated tick. While looking around for the culprit, Jarvis is startled by the tick and steps into a bear trap he had been testing. Several eggs drop on him while he struggles on the floor.

The group arrives at camp. In the boys' cabin, Tyler discovers an egg in the closet and pokes it with a coat hanger. Showing the oddity to Rome and Darrel, they wonder what it is, Darryl squishes the bug inside, and Tyler cleans up the mess.

Later, on a walk, Melissa is attacked by a tick which Tyler fends off, but the adults dismiss the kids' alarm.

That night, Brutus is attacked and killed by another mutated tick. Darrel, distraught, leaves camp in order to return to LA. The next day, at the suggestion of Sheriff Parker, Charles and Tyler take Brutus's body to a veterinarian for a necropsy. The vet discovers a tick inside of Brutus. The tick runs around the room, at one point attacking Tyler, until the veterinarian can squish it. While performing a necropsy on the tick, the vet discovers that it is a mutated common wood tick, and that its saliva causes hallucinations.

In the woods, Darrel is attacked by a tick. He pulls most of it off, but the head burrows deeper inside him and he begins to hallucinate.

While fishing, Kelly and Melissa discover Sheriff Parker's corpse in the pond. Elsewhere, while looking for a place to have sex with Rome, Didi finds Jarvis, who has amputated his legs and had ticks burrow inside him. Jarvis is caught in another trap and his face explodes.

In the woods, Darrel, hallucinating, stumbles onto Sir and Jerry's competing marijuana farm, and a confrontation results in Sir shooting Darrel and setting off a large wildfire.

On their return drive, Charles and Tyler pick up Rome and Dee Dee and return to tell the group what is happening. When the group goes to leave, they see that they are surrounded by fire and ticks, and are forced to take shelter in the cabin.

Sir and Jerry arrive, Jerry covered in ticks. Shortly after, Darrel arrives, but his wounds are too severe and Holly and Tyler comfort him as he dies. With his last breath, he indicates to Tyler that Sir and Jerry are responsible for his injuries. In the ensuing fray, Sir shoots Charles in the leg and Jerry attempts to bring the van around to pick up Sir. A tick attacks Jerry, who crashes the car into the cabin while hallucinating that Sir is the recently murdered Sheriff.

Darrel's body begins to move around the room, and in the confusion the kids and counselors get away from Sir and blockade themselves into another room. Darrel's corpse releases an even more giant tick, and it mauls Sir. Tyler, overcoming his anxiety, swings over to the van and drives it back to the window so everyone can escape. The giant tick attacks Rome, but Tyler lights it on fire and the group escapes as a propane tank incinerates the cabin and ticks inside. The survivors drive back into LA.

The van, now in a junkyard, begins to leak a thick goo. An egg falls from underneath the van and begins pulsating.

== Cast ==
- Peter Scolari as Charles Danson
- Rosalind Allen as Holly Lambert
- Ami Dolenz as Dee Dee Davenport
- Seth Green as Tyler Burns
- Clint Howard as Jarvis Tanner
- Rance Howard as Sheriff Parker
- Alfonso Ribeiro as Darrel "Panic" Lumley
- Barry Lynch as Sir
- Michael Medeiros as Jerry
- Judy Jean Berns as Dr. Kate
- Dina Dayrit as Kelly Mishimoto
- Virginya Keehne as Melissa Danson
- Timothy Landfield as Mr. Burns
- Ray Oriel as Rome Hernandez
- J.D. Stone as Young Tyler Burns

== Production ==
Doug Beswick came up with the idea for the film and supervised the special effects as well as being the associate producer of the film. The film was shot in Big Bear Lake, California.

== Home media ==
Ticks was released direct-to-video on May 24, 1994, by Republic Pictures and later Olive Films on DVD and Blu-ray in 2013. It ran for 85 minutes. Vinegar Syndrome licensed and released the film on 4K Blu-ray and Blu-ray in October 2021, featuring an all new 4K scan of the interpositive film element. It was discovered the film's original runtime was 88 minutes, containing 2 minutes of footage unseen on television and all previous home video releases. The release also includes a series of extras such as commentaries, making-of documentary, and more.
