= The Night Caller (1998 film) =

1998 film

- Directed by: Robert Malenfant
- Written by: Mark Bomback; George Saunders; Frank Rehwaldt
- Produced by: Pierre David
- Starring: Shanna Reed; Tracy Nelson; Mary Crosby; Cyndi Pass; Eve Sigall
- Cinematography: M. David Mullen
- Edited by: Julian Semilian
- Music by: Kubilay Uner
- Distributed by: Image Organization
- Release date: July 14, 1998
- Running time: 91 minutes
- Country: United States
- Language: English

The Night Caller is a 1998 American thriller film starring Shanna Reed and Tracy Nelson about a crazed woman who becomes obsessed with a radio talk-show personality.

== Plot ==
Beth Needham (Tracy Nelson) works the graveyard shift at a convenience store, and is becoming increasingly fed up with her job. To pass the time, she listens to a late-night San Diego radio show hosted by Dr. Lindsey Roland (Shanna Reed). One night, she musters up the courage to call into the show and she is encouraged to make some changes in her life and to call back in a few weeks to update the show's listeners on her progress.

It doesn't take long for Beth to quit her job, threatening her nasty boss with a knife while she's doing so. She despises her bed-ridden mother because she made her work long hours to support her and chastised her when she quit. After the chain-smoking, emphysemic mother dies (as a result of being deprived of oxygen), Beth finds out that she had more than $80,000 worth of a stock in her portfolio, and becomes even more enraged that she was forced to work for her even though she had plenty of money.

Beth becomes even more obsessed with the talk-show host and, after unsuccessfully trying to reach Lindsey again at the station, she tries to reach her at her psychiatry office. She then learns that Lindsey has an answering service and that its workers get to talk to the host all the time.

Beth applies for a job at the answering service, but is rejected in favor of a woman who she believes is a more physically attractive candidate. She kills the woman by hitting her with her car when she's walking in the parking lot after work. Beth then gets a call informing her that she got the job by default.

Beth's obsession with Lindsey grows even more once she establishes a relationship with her. She winds up babysitting her child, drugging him to make him fall asleep so she can photocopy Lindsey's journal, and steal her "April fresh" deodorant, and murders one of her other babysitters to get more time with her. And when one of Beth's co-workers learns how disturbed she really is from her former boss, she kills her too.

When Lindsey starts becoming suspicious about Beth, and tries to distance herself, she gets kidnapped at gunpoint and taken on a road trip. She eventually manages to get free, and after a scuffle in which she grabs Beth's gun, orders her (now using a pair of scissors as her "weapon") to back off. When she refuses and takes a threatening lunge, Lindsey reluctantly shoots her stalker to death, before breaking down in tears.

The closing scene shows Lindsey settling in as a national radio host in Los Angeles, dedicating her first show to her best friend (and former manager) Nikki, who Beth also killed, and saying that she has much healing to do, before taking her first call from Jacksonville, FL.

== Cast ==
- Tracy Nelson as Beth Needham
- Shanna Reed as Dr. Lindsay Roland
- Mary Crosby as Nikki Rogers
- Cyndi Pass as Marge Hampton
- Eve Sigall as Mama
- Zack Hopkins as Matt Roland
- Christopher Kriesa as Mr. Brill
- Luisa Leschin as Consuela
- Howard S. Miller as Lee Dixon
- Rance Howard as Hank
- Jean Speegle Howard as Jean
- Brad Sherwood as Andy Saden

== Release ==
=== Reception ===
The film has received mixed reviews from online critics.

On the website Buried.com, it was described as a "variation of Play Misty for Me" and that "Tracy Nelson does a great job as the disturbed, obsessed woman." In a review for Scared Stiff Reviews, it was said of the film that "The Night Caller is an absolute winner and it's due to the performance of Tracy Nelson. She plays the role as Anthony Perkins played Norman Bates." The film received a rating of 7.5/10. For Letterboxd, it was said that "It's too competently made to be a true train-wreck, it's more like a train...toppling-over that delays a shipment for 90 minutes."

=== Home media ===
The Night Caller has been released on VHS and DVD format in several countries. In the U.S. it was made available via Artisan Entertainment on July 14, 1998. As of 2018, the film has not yet received a DVD release in the U.S.

The film has been made available in international countries including the United Kingdom, where it received a VHS release, While a DVD edition was distributed by Delta Entertainment on September 23, 2002. In Australia, the film was released on DVD on May 17, 2004 by Beyond Home Entertainment. In Hong Kong, the film was released on DVD on May 20, 2004 by MPIR Laser & Video (HK), which includes Chinese subtitles. A VCD version was also released on the same day, which includes two VCD discs. In Denmark, the film was released on DVD somewhere around or before January 1, 2008 by DVD-Danmark, with English audio and Scandinavian subtitles. It was available both as an individual release and as part of a 4-DVD movie-bundle (along with 3 of The Howling sequels).
