= The Long Ride Home =

- Directed by: Rob Marcarelli
- Screenplay by: Vaughn Taylor
- Story by: Mike Dougherty
- Produced by: Rob Marcarelli; Paul Tinder; René Veluzat
- Starring: Randy Travis; Eric Roberts; Ernest Borgnine; Vaughn Taylor
- Cinematography: Gary Graver
- Edited by: Scott Popjes
- Music by: Gela Sawall Ashcroft
- Production companies: Rising Star Entertainment; Constellation Entertainment
- Distributed by: Lionsgate Films
- Release date: May 27, 2003
- Running time: 87 minutes
- Country: United States
- Languages: English; Latin

The Long Ride Home is a 2003 American Western film directed by Rob Marcarelli and starring Randy Travis, Eric Roberts, Ernest Borgnine and Vaughn Taylor (who wrote the screenplay).

== Plot ==
In 1866 New Mexico, a man going by the pseudonym Jack Cole, a famous gunman, is shot by a man hiding in the bushes. Jack's horse takes him to the home of Laura Fowler and her son Daniel, who nurse Jack back to health. Deputy Abel Hart arrives at the Fowler home seeking Jack, but Laura suspects that he is a fraud and claims that she has not seen Jack.

Laura later takes Jack aside and it is revealed that Jack is her long-lost husband, Jack Fowler, who left Laura eight years ago prior to Daniel being born. Daniel overhears the conversation and asks Jack about his past without revealing that he knows who he is. Jack tells how eight years ago he was confused for the real Jack Cole, an evil gunman, who killed several members of the Moat family, and was forced to kill a man to save himself. Now the head of the Moat family, Lucas, is after him.

Laura's fiancé, Sheriff Hank Bowman, is suspicious of Jack and gets into a fistfight with him, leading Jack to decide to move on to somewhere else. Angered, Daniel runs away. Hart returns and attacks Laura, who Jack tends to after finding her passed out in the barn. Hart kidnaps Daniel and reveals that he is the real Jack Cole, who spent eight years in jail before escaping and going after Jack Fowler for stealing his name and reputation. He leaves Daniel tied up as "bait" to catch Jack.

Jack Fowler goes on a search for Daniel, but Hart returns to Laura's home and she flees. Daniel is rescued by Lucas Moat and his two sons, but he returns to his home to see if Laura has been harmed, where Hart is waiting and holds Daniel overnight. The next morning, Jack and Laura arrive again and attempt to save Daniel. Lucas arrives with his sons and Hart shoots at them, leading to Lucas being fatally injured. The Moat sons shoot Hart and kill him, while Lucas dies relieved that he finally caught Hart, and is assured that God has forgiven him by Daniel.

Jack Fowler, now free to stop fleeing, lives with Laura again, and Bowman (who discovered Hart's true identity via a telegram the night before), although still somewhat jealous, accepts the situation and leaves happily.

== Cast ==
- Randy Travis as Jack Fowler / Jack Cole
- Eric Roberts as Sheriff Hank Bowman
- Ernest Borgnine as Lucas Moat
- Vaughn Taylor as Laura Fowler
- Paul Tinder as Deputy Hart
- Alec Medlock as Daniel Fowler
- Steve Nave as Caleb Moat
- Jeff McGrail as Kyle Moat
- Garry Marshall as Arthur
- Michele Dalcin as Miriam
- Stella Stevens as Fiona Champyon
- Rance Howard as Old man
- Jerry Doyle as Sheriff
- Jeff Dolan as Deputy
- Sam Dolan as Billy
- Peter Sherayko as Father Thadeus
- Sal Cardile as Gustis
- Larry A. Zeug as Prisoner #1
- Dan Erwin as Cousin Larry
- Elizabeth Tinder as Maid
- Greg Stanina as Rancher
