= Frontier Woman =

1956 movie

- Lobby card
- Directed by: Ron Ormond
- Screenplay by: Paul Piel
- Produced by: Lloyd Royal; Tom Garroway
- Starring: Cindy Carson; Lance Fuller; Ann Kelly
- Cinematography: Ted Allen
- Edited by: Hugh Winn
- Music by: Walter Greene
- Production companies: Panorama Pictures; Top Pictures
- Release date: July 1956
- Running time: 80 minutes
- Country: United States
- Language: English
- Budget: $86,000
- Box office: $190,000

Frontier Woman is a 1956 American Western film directed by Ron Ormond starring Cindy Carson, Lance Fuller and Ann Kelly. It was Ron Howard's film debut.

== Cast ==
- Cindy Carson as Polly
- Lance Fuller as Catwampus Jones
- Ann Kelly as Rosebud
- James Clayton as Neshoba
- Rance Howard as Prewitt

== Production ==
The film was the second from Panorama Pictures. It was filmed on the Chunky River in Mississippi.

== Censorship ==
Before Frontier Woman could be exhibited in Kansas, The Kansas Board of Review required the removal of a scene where a man bends a woman over and rubs his hands over her lower body. The reasoning given was "obscene action."
