= I Am Stamos =

- Directed by: Rob Meltzer
- Written by: Alex Eastburg; Rob Meltzer
- Produced by: Robert Peters; Alex Eastburg
- Starring: Robert Peters; John Stamos
- Cinematography: Jonathan Sela
- Edited by: Rob Meltzer
- Music by: Karl Preusser
- Production company: Mighty Atom Productions
- Distributed by: Red Navel Filmworks
- Release date: March 3, 2004 (US Comedy Arts Festival)
- Running time: 18 minutes
- Country: United States
- Language: English

I Am Stamos is a 2004 American short film starring John Stamos and Robert Peters, directed by Rob Meltzer. The film world premiered on March 3, 2004 at the US Comedy Arts Festival in Aspen, Colorado.

== Synopsis ==
Andy Shrub (played by Peters) is a struggling actor who seems to be typecast as "the goofy best friend'" but wants to be a leading man. At a birthday party, he wishes that he looked like John Stamos before blowing out the candles on his cake. He suddenly understands that he always seems to be Stamos when he is captured on camera or in a video. He is then cast in a sitcom as John Stamos.

When John Stamos (playing himself), finds out about this, he angrily goes to the studio and argues with Andy and his producer Norman (played by E.E. Bell). The movie ends with the real John Stamos being killed.

== Cast ==
- Robert Peters as Andry Shrub
- John Stamos as Himself
- E.E. Bell as Norman
- Jordana Capra as The Casting Director
- Zena Leigh as The Casting Assistant
- Chris Kennedy as J.P.
