= I Don't Buy Kisses Anymore =

- Theatrical release poster
- Directed by: Robert Marcarelli
- Written by: Jonnie Lindsell
- Produced by: Mitchel Matovich
- Starring: Jason Alexander; Nia Peeples; Lainie Kazan; Lou Jacobi; Eileen Brennan
- Cinematography: Michael Ferris
- Edited by: Joanne D'Antonio
- Music by: Cobb Bussinger
- Production company: Web Marc Productions
- Distributed by: Skouras Pictures
- Release date: April 24, 1992
- Running time: 110 minutes
- Country: United States
- Languages: English; Italian

I Don't Buy Kisses Anymore is a 1992 American romantic comedy film directed by Robert Marcarelli and starring Jason Alexander and Nia Peeples.

== Plot ==
Bernie Fishbine (Jason Alexander) first sees Theresa Garabaldi (Nia Peeples) in his neighborhood candy store, where he frequently buys chocolate kisses. Then they meet at the bus stop and take the same bus route every evening.

For Bernie there is immediate kismet and when Theresa mentions to him she performs on piano in her uncle's Italian restaurant, he decides to go watch her. It is here where she gets him to join a gym.

Always a tad overweight, Bernie is shy and self-conscious about his weight and looks. Theresa convinces him he can improve himself enrolling at the gym where she works out, telling him that she too was overweight when she was younger, so she can relate.

Living with his mother and grandfather, Bernie has been forced to run the family shoe store ever since his father died 12 years ago. His older brother is the family success and Bernie lives in his shadow and is run by his mom.

After Bernie joins the gym he successfully drops about 25 pounds. The more weight he loses, the stronger he feels about Theresa. One night, he shows up at the restaurant where she and a girlfriend are having dinner. Finding out it’s a double date, he grabs a random woman at the bar and treats her to a meal.

Upset, Bernie binge eats, observed from afar by Theresa and her friend. She is convinced by the friend to use him as a subject for her thesis. The topic then becomes about an obese man and his struggle to lose weight.

After a number of false starts, Bernie and Therese spend more and more time together. He sees it as dating, but in her mind they are just friends. His mother is not so happy her son is seeing an Italian, a non-Jew. Theresa even takes Bernie home to meet her family. There, looking at photo albums, Bernie sees Theresa was never fat. Upset, she calms him down, saying she did it to help him. He forgives her, and they really kiss for the first time.

Bernie decides to propose. He has the ring and stops by Theresa’s apartment to surprise her. She lets him in, but as she has been in the shower she retreats to the bathroom to finish drying off.

While Theresa is absent, Bernie walks about the apartment and finds the thesis. When he reads it, he believes everything about her is a lie. She was never fat and he is the obese man who is the central subject. Theresa finds Bernie reading and there is an expected eruption from Bernie who flees the apartment, crushed.

Bernie decides he needs to get away, so he takes off for a vacation in Cancun. While he is gone, his mother finds the ring and is shocked how close she was to having Theresa part of the family. When Bernie returns he finds his mother has already set up a dinner with a Jewish girl. He blows up again and it looks like he will be returning to his bad habits: eating Hershey kisses from the local candy shop.

Bernie’s grandpa and mother decide to meddle. Marching into the Italian restaurant, he essentially proposes and Theresa accepts. She finds him and proposes. Bernie angrily takes the ring and leaves, but returns and proposes back.

== Cast ==
- Jason Alexander as Bernie Fishbine
- Nia Peeples as Theresa Garabaldi
- Lainie Kazan as Sarah Fishbine
- Lou Jacobi as Irving Fein
- Eileen Brennan as Freida
- David Bowe as Norman Fishbine
- Michele Scarabelli as Connie Klinger
- Hilary Shepard as Ada Fishbine

== Production ==
The film was shot in Philadelphia.

== Reception ==
John Ferguson of Radio Times awarded the film two stars out of five. Leonard Maltin also gave the film two stars. Entertainment Weekly graded the film a D+.
