= List of American films of 1994 =

This is a list of American films released in 1994.

== Box office ==
The highest-grossing American films released in 1994, by domestic box office gross revenue, are as follows:

Highest-grossing films of 1994
Rank	Title	Distributor	Domestic gross
1	Forrest Gump	Paramount	$329,694,499
2	The Lion King	Buena Vista	$312,855,561
3	True Lies	20th Century Fox	$146,282,411
4	The Santa Clause	Buena Vista	$144,833,357
5	The Flintstones	Universal	$130,531,208
6	Dumb and Dumber	New Line Cinema	$127,175,374
7	Clear and Present Danger	Paramount	$122,187,717
8	Speed	20th Century Fox	$121,248,145
9	The Mask	New Line Cinema	$119,938,730
10	Pulp Fiction	Miramax	$107,928,762

== January–March ==
Opening		Title	Production company	Cast and crew	Ref.
J A N U A R Y	7	The Air Up There	Hollywood Pictures / Interscope Communications	Paul Michael Glaser (director); Max Apple (screenplay); Kevin Bacon, Charles Gitonga Maina, Yolanda Vasquez, Winston Ntshona, Mabutho 'Kid' Sithole, Sean McCann, Dennis Patrick, Nigel Miguel	
J A N U A R Y	7	Cabin Boy	Touchstone Pictures	Adam Resnick (director/screenplay); Chris Elliott, Andy Richter, David Letterman, Mike Starr, Ann Magnuson, Jim Cummings, James Gammon, Brion James, Brian Doyle-Murray, Ritch Brinkley, Melora Walters, Russ Tamblyn, Bob Elliott, Ricki Lake, Alex Nevil, David Henry Sterry, Alfred Molina	
J A N U A R Y	14	House Party 3	New Line Cinema	Eric Meza (director); David Toney, Takashi Bufford (screenplay); Christopher "Kid" Reid, Christopher "Play" Martin, Bernie Mac, David Edwards, Angela Means, Tisha Campbell, Chris Tucker, Anthony Johnson, Ketty Lester, Khandi Alexander, Marques Houston, Young Rome, Don Santos, Michael Colyar, Reynaldo Rey, Simply Marvalous, TLC, Shireen Crutchfield, Chuckii Booker, Gilbert Gottfried	
J A N U A R Y	14	Iron Will	Walt Disney Pictures	Charles Haid (director); John Michael Hayes, Djordje Milicevic, Jeff Arch (screenplay); Mackenzie Astin, Kevin Spacey, David Ogden Stiers, August Schellenberg, George Gerdes, Penelope Windust, Brian Cox, Rex Linn, John Terry, Richard Riehle, Beau	
J A N U A R Y	21	Intersection	Paramount Pictures	Mark Rydell (director); David Rayfiel, Marshall Brickman (screenplay); Richard Gere, Sharon Stone, Lolita Davidovich, Martin Landau, David Selby, Jennifer Morrison, Ron White, Matthew Walker, Scott Bellis, Patricia Harras, Robyn Stevan, Kevin McNulty, Jay Brazeau, Mark Roberts, Timothy Webber, Garry Chalk, Veena Sood	
J A N U A R Y	28	Blink	New Line Cinema	Michael Apted (director); Dana Stevens (screenplay); Madeleine Stowe, Aidan Quinn, James Remar, Peter Friedman, Paul Dillon, Laurie Metcalf, Bruce A. Young, Matt Roth, Tim Monsion, Jackie Moran	
J A N U A R Y	28	Body Snatchers	Warner Bros. Pictures	Abel Ferrara (director); Stuart Gordon, Dennis Paoli, Nicholas St. John (screenplay); Gabrielle Anwar, Terry Kinney, Billy Wirth, Forest Whitaker, Meg Tilly, Reilly Murphy, Christine Elise, R. Lee Ermey, Kathleen Doyle, G. Elvis Phillips, Tonea Stewart	
J A N U A R Y	28	Car 54, Where Are You?	Orion Pictures	Bill Fishman (director); Erik Tarloff, Ebbe Roe Smith, Peter McCarthy, Peter Crabbe (screenplay); David Johansen, John C. McGinley, Rosie O'Donnell, Fran Drescher, Nipsey Russell, Al Lewis, Daniel Baldwin, Jeremy Piven, Tone Loc, The Ramones, Penn and Teller	
J A N U A R Y	28	The Scent of Green Papaya	First Look International	Tran Anh Hung (director/screenplay); Tran Nu Yên-Khê, Thi Loc Truong, Anh Hoa Nguyen, Hoa Hoi Vuong, Ngoc Trung Than, Vantha Talisman, Keo Souvannavong, Van Oanh Nguyen, Gerard Neth, Nhat Do, Thi Hai Vo, Thi Thanh Tra Nguyen, Lam Huy Bui, Xuan Thu Nguyen	
F E B R U A R Y	4	Ace Ventura: Pet Detective	Warner Bros. Pictures / Morgan Creek Productions	Tom Shadyac (director/screenplay); Jack Bernstein, Jim Carrey (screenplay); Jim Carrey, Courteney Cox, Sean Young, Tone Lōc, Dan Marino, Noble Willingham, Troy Evans, Raynor Scheine, Udo Kier, Frank Adonis, Tiny Ron Taylor, David Margulies, John Capodice, Judy Clayton, Bill Zuckert, Alice Drummond, Rebecca Ferratti, Mark Margolis, Antoni Corone, Randall "Tex" Cobb, Cannibal Corpse, Greg Finley	
F E B R U A R Y	4	Gunmen	Dimension Films / Davis Entertainment	Deran Sarafian (director); Stephen Sommers (screenplay); Christopher Lambert, Mario Van Peebles, Denis Leary, Kadeem Hardison, Sally Kirkland, Patrick Stewart, Richard C. Sarafian, Robert Harper, Brenda Bakke, Humberto Elizondo, Deran Sarafian, Christopher Michael, Rena Riffel, Big Daddy Kane, Kid Frost, Rakim, Eric B., Doctor Dre, Ed Lover, Christopher Williams	
F E B R U A R Y	4	I'll Do Anything	Columbia Pictures	James L. Brooks (director/screenplay); Nick Nolte, Albert Brooks, Julie Kavner, Joely Richardson, Tracey Ullman, Whittni Wright, Joely Fisher, Vicki Lewis, Anne Heche, Ian McKellen, Angela Alvarado, Chelsea Field, Robert Joy, Maria Pitillo, Suzzanne Douglas, Joseph Malone, Jake Busey, Harry Shearer, Rosie O'Donnell, Ken Page, Perry Anzilotti, Wren T. Brown, Arvie Lowe Jr., Heather DeLoach, Steve Vinovich, Andy Milder, Ron Perkins, Aaron Lustig, Kate McNeil, Patrick Cassidy, Woody Harrelson, Tricia Leigh Fisher, Sandy Helberg, Scott Krinsky, Maggie Roswell	
F E B R U A R Y	4	My Father the Hero	Touchstone Pictures	Steve Miner (director); Francis Veber (screenplay); Gérard Depardieu, Katherine Heigl, Dalton James, Lauren Hutton, Faith Prince, Stephen Tobolowsky, Ann Hearn, Robyn Peterson, Frank Renzulli, Manny Jacobs, Jeffrey Chea, Stephen Burrows, Michael Robinson, Robert Miner, Betty Miner, Roberto Escobar	
F E B R U A R Y	4	Naked	Fine Line Features	Mike Leigh (director/screenplay); David Thewlis, Katrin Cartlidge, Lesley Sharp, Greg Cruttwell, Claire Skinner, Peter Wight, Ewan Bremner, Elizabeth Berrington, Gina McKee, Toby Jones, Darren Tunstall, Susan Vidler	
F E B R U A R Y	4	Romeo Is Bleeding	Gramercy Pictures / PolyGram Filmed Entertainment	Peter Medak (director); Hilary Henkin (screenplay); Gary Oldman, Lena Olin, Annabella Sciorra, Juliette Lewis, Roy Scheider, Michael Wincott, David Proval, Will Patton, James Cromwell, Tony Sirico, Ron Perlman, Neal Jones, Dennis Farina, Julia Migenes, Jay Patterson	
F E B R U A R Y	11	Blank Check	Walt Disney Pictures	Rupert Wainwright (director); Blake Snyder, Colby Carr (screenplay); Brian Bonsall, Karen Duffy, Miguel Ferrer, Tone Lōc, Michael Lerner, James Rebhorn, Jayne Atkinson, Michael Faustino, Chris Demetral, Rick Ducommun, Debbie Allen, Angee Hughes	
F E B R U A R Y	11	The Getaway	Universal Pictures / Largo Entertainment	Roger Donaldson (director); Walter Hill, Amy Holden Jones (screenplay); Alec Baldwin, Kim Basinger, Michael Madsen, James Woods, David Morse, Jennifer Tilly, James Stephens, Richard Farnsworth, Philip Seymour Hoffman, Burton Gilliam, Royce D. Applegate, Daniel Villareal	
F E B R U A R Y	11	My Girl 2	Columbia Pictures / Imagine Entertainment	Howard Zieff (director); Laurice Elehwany (screenplay); Dan Aykroyd, Jamie Lee Curtis, Anna Chlumsky, Austin O'Brien, Richard Masur, Christine Ebersole, John David Souther, Angeline Ball, Aubrey Morris, Gerrit Graham, Anthony R. Jones, Ben Stein, Keone Young, Richard Beymer, Jodie Markell	
F E B R U A R Y	12	State of Emergency	HBO Showcase / Chestnut Hill Productions	Lesli Linka Glatter (director); Susan Black, Lance Gentile (screenplay); Joe Mantegna, Lynn Whitfield, Melinda Dillon, Paul Dooley, Jay O. Sanders, Richard Beymer, Robert Beltran, Christopher Birt, Dean Cameron, Deborah Kara Unger, Paul Ben-Victor, F. William Parker, Lucy Butler, Gerald Castillo, John Considine, Irene Olga López, Lance Gentile, Quinn Harmon, Josie Kim, Vanessa Marquez, Gregory Sporleder, Kate Williamson, Blair Tefkin	
F E B R U A R Y	18	Blue Chips	Paramount Pictures	William Friedkin (director); Ron Shelton (screenplay); Nick Nolte, Shaquille O'Neal, Mary McDonnell, J.T. Walsh, Ed O'Neill, Alfre Woodard, Bob Cousy, Matt Nover, Anfernee "Penny" Hardaway, Anthony C. Hall, Marques Johnson, Robert Wuhl, Cylk Cozart, Jim Beaver, Nigel Miguel, Jerry Tarkanian, Jim Boeheim, Kevin Garnett, Allan Houston, Dick Vitale, Larry Bird, Todd Donoho, Rick Pitino, George Lynch, Al Hoffman, Erik Albers	
F E B R U A R Y	18	On Deadly Ground	Warner Bros. Pictures / Seagal-Nasso Productions	Steven Seagal (director); Ed Horowitz, Robin U. Russin (screenplay); Steven Seagal, Michael Caine, Joan Chen, John C. McGinley, R. Lee Ermey, Shari Shattuck, Billy Bob Thornton, Richard Hamilton, John Trudell, Mike Starr, Sven-Ole Thorsen, Irvin Kershner, Bart the Bear	
F E B R U A R Y	18	Reality Bites	Universal Pictures / Jersey Films	Ben Stiller (director); Helen Childress (screenplay); Winona Ryder, Ethan Hawke, Ben Stiller, Janeane Garofalo, Steve Zahn, Swoosie Kurtz, Harry O'Reilly, Barry Del Sherman, Anne Meara, Andy Dick, Keith David, David Pirner, Evan Dando, Karen Duffy, Joe Don Baker, John Mahoney, John F. O'Donohue, Renée Zellweger, Jeanne Tripplehorn, Bill Bolender, Pat Crawford Brown, Anthony Robbins, David Spade	
F E B R U A R Y	25	8 Seconds	New Line Cinema / Jersey Films	John G. Avildsen (director); Monte Merrick (screenplay); Luke Perry, Stephen Baldwin, Red Mitchell, Cynthia Geary, James Rebhorn, Carrie Snodgress, Linden Ashby, Renée Zellweger, Cameron Finley, George Michael, Brooks & Dunn, Vince Gill, Karla Bonoff	
F E B R U A R Y	25	Midnight Cowboy (re-release)	United Artists	John Schlesinger (director); Waldo Salt (screenplay); Dustin Hoffman, Jon Voight, Brenda Vaccaro, John McGiver, Ruth White, Sylvia Miles, Barnard Hughes, Jennifer Salt, Gilman Rankin, Georgann Johnson, Anthony Holland, Bob Balaban, Viva, Paul Rossilli, Craig Carrington	
F E B R U A R Y	25	Sugar Hill	20th Century Fox / Beacon Pictures	Leon Ichaso (director); Barry Michael Cooper (screenplay); Wesley Snipes, Michael Wright, Clarence Williams III, Theresa Randle, Abe Vigoda, Ernie Hudson, Steve Harris, O.L. Duke, Donald Faison, Joe Dallesandro, Leslie Uggams, Vondie Curtis-Hall, Khandi Alexander, DeVaughn Nixon	
M A R C H	4	Angie	Hollywood Pictures / Caravan Pictures	Martha Coolidge (director); Todd Graff (screenplay); Geena Davis, Stephen Rea, James Gandolfini, Aida Turturro, Philip Bosco, Jenny O'Hara, Michael Rispoli, Rosemary De Angelis, Rae Allen, Frank Pellegrino, Olga Merediz, Marylouise Burke, Marin Hinkle, Charlayne Woodard, Adam LeFevre, Joanne Baron, April Grace, Vernee Watson-Johnson, Bibi Osterwald, Margaret Cho, Dawn Hudson	
M A R C H	4	The Chase	20th Century Fox	Adam Rifkin (director/screenplay); Charlie Sheen, Kristy Swanson, Henry Rollins, Josh Mostel, Ray Wise, Rocky Carroll, Bree Walker, Marshall Bell, Claudia Christian, Natalia Nogulich, Cary Elwes, Flea, Anthony Kiedis, Cassian Elwes, Ron Jeremy, Marco Perella, John S. Davies, R. Bruce Elliott, James R. Black	
M A R C H	4	China Moon	Orion Pictures	John Bailey (director); Roy Carlson (screenplay); Ed Harris, Madeleine Stowe, Benicio del Toro, Charles Dance, Patricia Healy, Tim Powell, Pruitt Taylor Vince	
M A R C H	4	Greedy	Universal Pictures / Imagine Entertainment	Jonathan Lynn (director); Lowell Ganz, Babaloo Mandel (screenplay); Michael J. Fox, Kirk Douglas, Nancy Travis, Olivia d'Abo, Phil Hartman, Ed Begley Jr., Jere Burns, Colleen Camp, Bob Balaban, Joyce Hyser, Mary Ellen Trainor, Siobhan Fallon, Kevin McCarthy, Khandi Alexander, Jonathan Lynn, Francis X. McCarthy, Tom Mason, Austin Pendleton, Lowell Ganz, Adam Hendershott, Eric Lloyd, Kirsten Dunst	
M A R C H	4	Sirens	Miramax Films	John Duigan (director/screenplay); Hugh Grant, Tara Fitzgerald, Sam Neill, Pamela Rabe, Elle Macpherson, Portia de Rossi, Kate Fischer, Ben Mendelsohn, John Polson, Julia Stone, Vincent Ball, John Duigan, Mark Gerber, Ellie McCarthy	
M A R C H	9	Four Weddings and a Funeral	Gramercy Pictures / PolyGram Filmed Entertainment	Mike Newell (director); Richard Curtis (screenplay); Hugh Grant, Andie MacDowell, James Fleet, Simon Callow, John Hannah, Kristin Scott Thomas, David Bower, Charlotte Coleman, Timothy Walker, Sara Crowe, Rowan Atkinson, David Haig, Sophie Thompson, Corin Redgrave, Anna Chancellor, Rupert Vansittart	
M A R C H	11	Guarding Tess	TriStar Pictures	Hugh Wilson (director/screenplay); Peter Torokvei (screenplay); Shirley MacLaine, Nicolas Cage, Austin Pendleton, Edward Albert, James Rebhorn, Richard Griffiths, John Roselius, David Graf, Don Yesso, James Lally, Brant von Hoffman, Harry J. Lennix, Susan Blommaert, Dale Dye, James Handy, Hugh Wilson	
M A R C H	11	The Hudsucker Proxy	Warner Bros. Pictures / Silver Pictures	Joel Coen, Ethan Coen (directors/screenplay); Tim Robbins, Jennifer Jason Leigh, Paul Newman, Jim True, Bill Cobbs, Harry Bugin, Bruce Campbell, John Mahoney, Charles Durning, Patrick Cranshaw, Anna Nicole Smith, Steve Buscemi, Sam Raimi, Jon Polito, John Goodman	
M A R C H	11	Lightning Jack	Savoy Pictures	Simon Wincer (director); Paul Hogan (screenplay); Paul Hogan, Cuba Gooding Jr., Beverly D'Angelo, Kamala Lopez, Pat Hingle, L.Q. Jones, Richard Riehle, Frank McRae, Roger Daltrey, Max Cullen	
M A R C H	11	The Ref	Touchstone Pictures / Don Simpson/Jerry Bruckheimer Films	Ted Demme (director); Richard LaGravenese, Marie Weiss (screenplay); Denis Leary, Judy Davis, Kevin Spacey, Robert J. Steinmiller Jr., Glynis Johns, Raymond J. Barry, Richard Bright, Christine Baranski, Adam LeFevre, Phillip Nicoll, Ellie Raab, Bill Raymond, John Scurti, Jim Turner, Edward Saxon, Kenneth Utt, Robert Ridgely, J.K. Simmons	
M A R C H	11	The Silence of the Hams	October Films / Silvio Berlusconi Productions / 30th Century Wolf	Ezio Greggio (director/screenplay); Ezio Greggio, Dom DeLuise, Billy Zane, Joanna Pacula, Charlene Tilton, Martin Balsam, Stuart Pankin, John Astin, Phyllis Diller, Bubba Smith, Larry Storch, Rip Taylor, Shelley Winters, Nedra Volz, Andre Brown, Henry Silva, Marshall Bell, Lee Allan, Pat Rick, Tony Cox, Joe Dante, John Carpenter, Irwin Keyes, Eddie Deezen, Kenneth Davitian, Peter DeLuise, John Landis, David DeLuise, Al Ruscio, Dom Irrera, Lance Kinsey, Shelly Desai, Lonnie Burr, Debra Christofferson, Rudy De Luca, Jeff Weston, Raymond Serra, Daniel McVicar, Wilhelm von Homburg, Rino Piccolo, Mel Brooks	
M A R C H	18	Bitter Moon	Fine Line Features	Roman Polanski (director/screenplay); Gerard Brach, John Brownjohn (screenplay); Peter Coyote, Emmanuelle Seigner, Hugh Grant, Kristin Scott Thomas, Victor Banerjee, Stockard Channing	
M A R C H	18	Monkey Trouble	New Line Cinema	Franco Amurri (director/screenplay); Stu Drieger (screenplay); Thora Birch, Harvey Keitel, Mimi Rogers, Christopher McDonald, Alison Elliott, Remy Ryan, Jo Champa, Adam LaVorgna, Robert Miranda, Victor Argo, Julie Payne, Kimberly Cullum, Harvey Vernon, Gerry Bednob, Aaron Lustig, Richard Reicheg, Rino Piccolo, Frank Welker, Deborah White, Kevin Scannell, Robert A. Perry, Adrian and Julian Johnson	
M A R C H	18	Naked Gun 33 1/3: The Final Insult	Paramount Pictures	Peter Segal (director); Pat Proft, David Zucker, Robert LoCash (screenplay); Leslie Nielsen, Priscilla Presley, George Kennedy, O. J. Simpson, Fred Ward, Kathleen Freeman, Anna Nicole Smith, Ellen Greene, Ed Williams, Raye Birk, James Earl Jones, Olympia Dukakis, Raquel Welch, Joe Grifasi, Bill Erwin, "Weird Al" Yankovic, Vanna White, Pia Zadora, Mary Lou Retton, Earl Boen, Rosalind Allen, Charlotte Zucker, Lois de Banzie, Doris Belack, Randall "Tex" Cobb, Ann B. Davis, Julie Strain, John Capodice, David Zucker, Robert K. Weiss, Peter Segal, Glen Chin, Florence Henderson, Paul Feig, Elisa Pensler Gabrielli, Taran Killam, Shannen Doherty, R. Lee Ermey, Morgan Fairchild, Elliott Gould, Kevin Grevioux, Mariel Hemingway, Lillian Lehman, Thomas Rosales Jr., Bruce A. Young	
M A R C H	18	The Paper	Universal Pictures / Imagine Entertainment	Ron Howard (director); David Koepp, Stephen Koepp (screenplay); Michael Keaton, Glenn Close, Marisa Tomei, Randy Quaid, Robert Duvall, Jason Robards, Jason Alexander, Spalding Gray, Catherine O'Hara, Lynne Thigpen, Jack Kehoe, Roma Maffia, Clint Howard, Geoffrey Owens, Amelia Campbell, Jill Hennessy, William Prince, Augusta Dabney, Bruce Altman, Jack McGee, Bobo Lewis, Edward Hibbert, Siobhan Fallon, Gary Dourdan, Stephen Koepp, James Colby, Rance Howard, Jean Speegle Howard, Jim Meskimen, Myra Lucretia Taylor, Harsh Nayyar, Rosanna Scotto, Donna Hanover, Jane Hanson, Chuck Scarborough, Brenda Blackmon, Cynthia Carter, E. Graydon Carter, Bob Costas, Harold "Happy" Hairston, Pete Hamill, William Kunstler, Kurt Loder, Mike McAlary, Joanna Molloy, Richard Price, John Miller	
M A R C H	25	Above the Rim	New Line Cinema	Jeff Pollack (director/screenplay); Barry Michael Cooper (screenplay); Duane Martin, Leon Robinson, Tupac Shakur, Marlon Wayans, Bernie Mac, David Bailey, Tonya Pinkins, Wood Harris, Shawn Michael Howard, Henry Simmons, Matthew Guletz, Michael Rispoli, Eric Nies, Byron Minns, Bill Raftery, James Williams, Pee Wee Kirkland, John Thompson	
M A R C H	25	D2: The Mighty Ducks	Walt Disney Pictures	Sam Weisman (director); Steven Brill (screenplay); Emilio Estevez, Kathryn Erbe, Michael Tucker, Jan Rubes, Carsten Norgaard, Maria Ellingsen, Joshua Jackson, Elden Henson, Shaun Weiss, Brandon Adams, Matt Doherty, Vincent Larusso, Garette Ratliff Henson, Marguerite Moreau, Colombe Jacobsen, Aaron Lohr, Ty O'Neal, Kenan Thompson, Mike Vitar, Justin Wong, Scott Whyte	
M A R C H	26	Against the Wall	HBO Pictures	John Frankenheimer (director); Ron Hutchinson (screenplay); Kyle MacLachlan, Samuel L. Jackson, Clarence Williams III, Frederic Forrest, Harry Dean Stanton, Philip Bosco, Tom Bower, Anne Heche, Carmen Argenziano, Peter Murnik, Steve Harris, David Ackroyd, Mark Cabus, Bruce Evers, Joey Anderson, Bud Davis, Danny Drew, Jeffrey Ford, Denis Forest, Juan García, Danny Trejo	
M A R C H	29	Class of 1999 II: The Substitute	CineTel Films	Spiro Razatos (director); Mark Sevi (screenplay); Sasha Mitchell, Caitlin Dulany, Nick Cassavetes, Diego Serrano, Chris Durand, Gregory West, Rick Hill, Jack Knight, Berny Pock, Christopher Brown, Eric Stabenau, Jean St. James	
M A R C H	30	Cronos	October Films	Guillermo del Toro (director/screenplay); Federico Luppi, Ron Perlman, Claudio Brook, Margarita Isabel, Daniel Giménez Cacho, Jorge Martínez de Hoyos, Guillermo del Toro, Tamara Shanath, Mario Iván Martínez, Farnesio de Bernal	
M A R C H	30	Jimmy Hollywood	Paramount Pictures / Baltimore Pictures	Barry Levinson (director/screenplay); Joe Pesci, Christian Slater, Victoria Abril, Robert LaSardo, Earl Billings, Jason Beghe, Rob Weiss, Chad McQueen, Barry Levinson, Harrison Ford, Richard Kind, Marcus Giamatti, Ralph Tabakin, James Pickens Jr., Lou Cutell, Thomas Rosales Jr., Chuck Zito, Robbi Chong, Jodie Markell, Reginald Ballard, Terri Ivens, Jerry Dunphy, Claudia Haro, Arthel Neville	
M A R C H	30	Major League II	Warner Bros. Pictures / Morgan Creek Productions	David S. Ward (director/screenplay); R.J. Stewart, Tom S. Parker, Jim Jennewein (screenplay); Charlie Sheen, Tom Berenger, Corbin Bernsen, Dennis Haysbert, James Gammon, Omar Epps, Bob Uecker, David Keith, Takaaki Ishibashi, Margaret Whitton, Eric Bruskotter, Alison Doody, Michelle Burke, Rene Russo, Jay Leno, Randy Quaid, Richard Schiff, Jesse Ventura, Steve Yeager, Kevin Hickey	
M A R C H	30	Thumbelina	Warner Bros. Pictures / Don Bluth Entertainment	Don Bluth, Gary Goldman (directors); Don Bluth (screenplay); Jodi Benson, Gary Imhoff, Joe Lynch, Gino Conforti, Gilbert Gottfried, Carol Channing, John Hurt, Barbara Cook, Charo, Kenneth Mars, June Foray, Will Ryan, Danny Mann, Loren Lester, Pat Musick, Neil Ross, Michael Nunes, Tawny Sunshine Glover, Kendall Cunningham, Tony Jay, Scott Menville, Harry Shearer, Kath Soucie, Stevie Vallance	

== April–June ==
Opening		Title	Production company	Cast and crew	Ref.
A P R I L	1	Clifford	Orion Pictures	Paul Flaherty (director); Jay Dee Rock, Bobby Von Hayes (screenplay); Martin Short, Charles Grodin, Mary Steenburgen, Dabney Coleman, Richard Kind, Jennifer Savidge, Ben Savage, Don Galloway, Tim Lane, Timothy Stack, Marianne Muellerleile, G. D. Spradlin, Anne Jeffreys, Richard Fancy	
A P R I L	1	The House of the Spirits	Miramax Films	Bille August (director/screenplay); Meryl Streep, Jeremy Irons, Glenn Close, Winona Ryder, Antonio Banderas, Vanessa Redgrave, Armin Mueller-Stahl, María Conchita Alonso, Vincent Gallo, Jan Niklas, Teri Polo, Grace Gummer	
A P R I L	8	Holy Matrimony	Hollywood Pictures / Interscope Communications	Leonard Nimoy (director); David Weisberg, Douglas S. Cook (screenplay); Patricia Arquette, Joseph Gordon-Levitt, Tate Donovan, Armin Mueller-Stahl, John Schuck, Lois Smith, Courtney B. Vance, Jeffrey Nordling, Richard Riehle, Mary Pat Gleason, Lori Alan, Alan Blumenfeld	
A P R I L	8	Leprechaun 2	Trimark Pictures	Rodman Flender (director); Turi Meyer, Al Septien (screenplay); Warwick Davis, Charlie Heath, Shevonne Durkin, Sandy Baron, Adam Biesk, James Lancaster, Linda Hopkins, Arturo Gil, Kimmy Robertson, Clint Howard, Andrew Craig, David Powledge, Billy Beck, Al White, Martha Hackett, Jonathan R. Perkins, Tony Cox, Mark Kiely, Michael James McDonald, Warren A. Stevens, Matthew Anderson, Dawn Comer, Barry Schwartz, Gabriella Sinclair, Danny Roque	
A P R I L	8	Red Rock West	Roxie Releasing	John Dahl (director/screenplay); Rick Dahl (screenplay); Nicolas Cage, Dennis Hopper, Lara Flynn Boyle, Timothy Carhart, J. T. Walsh, Dwight Yoakam, Robert Apel	
A P R I L	8	Threesome	TriStar Pictures / Motion Picture Corporation of America	Andrew Fleming (director/screenplay); Lara Flynn Boyle, Stephen Baldwin, Josh Charles, Alexis Arquette, Martha Gehman, Mark Arnold, Michele Matheson, Joanne Baron	
A P R I L	13	Naked in New York	Fine Line Features	Daniel Algrant (director/screenplay); John Warren (screenplay); Eric Stoltz, Mary-Louise Parker, Ralph Macchio, Jill Clayburgh, Tony Curtis, Timothy Dalton, Kathleen Turner, Whoopi Goldberg, Lynne Thigpen, Roscoe Lee Browne, Paul Guilfoyle, Lisa Gay Hamilton, Chris Noth, Calista Flockhart, Arabella Field, Colleen Camp, Griffin Dunne, Luis Guzman, David Johansen, Eric Bogosian, Quentin Crisp, Burr Steers, Arthur Penn, William Styron, Marsha Norman, Richard Price	
A P R I L	13	Serial Mom	Savoy Pictures	John Waters (director/screenplay); Kathleen Turner, Sam Waterston, Ricki Lake, Matthew Lillard, Scott Wesley Morgan, Walt MacPherson, Patricia Dunnock, Mink Stole, Mary Jo Catlett, Justin Whalin, Beau James, Patty Hearst, Lonnie Horsey, Traci Lords, Tim Caggiano, Jeff Mandon, Kim Swann, Kathy Fannon, Patsy Grady Abrams, Suzanne Somers, Joan Rivers, L7, Bess Armstrong, John Waters	
A P R I L	15	Backbeat	Gramercy Pictures	Iain Softley (director/screenplay); Michael Thomas, Stephen Ward (screenplay); Sheryl Lee, Stephen Dorff, Ian Hart, Gary Bakewell, Chris O'Neill, Scot Williams, Kai Wiesinger, Jennifer Ehle	
A P R I L	15	Cops & Robbersons	TriStar Pictures	Michael Ritchie (director); Lindsay Maher (screenplay); Chevy Chase, Jack Palance, Dianne Wiest, Robert Davi, Jason James Richter, David Barry Gray, Fay Masterson, Miko Hughes, Richard Romanus, Sal Landi, Jack Kehler, M. Emmet Walsh	
A P R I L	15	Surviving the Game	New Line Cinema	Ernest R. Dickerson (director); Dylan Brunson (screenplay); Ice-T, Rutger Hauer, Gary Busey, Charles S. Dutton, F. Murray Abraham, John C. McGinley, William McNamara, Jeff Corey	
A P R I L	15	White Fang 2: Myth of the White Wolf	Walt Disney Pictures	Ken Olin (director); David Fallon (screenplay); Scott Bairstow, Charmaine Craig, Al Harrington, Anthony Ruivivar, Victoria Racimo, Alfred Molina, Geoffrey Lewis, Matthew Cowles, Ethan Hawke, Paul Coeur	
A P R I L	22	Bad Girls	20th Century Fox	Jonathan Kaplan (director); Ken Friedman, Yolande Turner (screenplay); Madeleine Stowe, Mary Stuart Masterson, Andie MacDowell, Drew Barrymore, Dermot Mulroney, James Russo, James LeGros, Robert Loggia, Jim Beaver, Nick Chinlund, Harry Northup, Don Hood	
A P R I L	22	Brainscan	Triumph Films	John Flynn (director); Brian Owens, Andrew Kevin Walker (screenplay); Edward Furlong, Frank Langella, T. Ryder Smith, Amy Hargreaves, Jamie Marsh, Tod Fennell	
A P R I L	22	Chasers	Warner Bros. Pictures / Morgan Creek Productions	Dennis Hopper (director); Joe Batteer, John Rice, Dan Gilroy (screenplay); Tom Berenger, William McNamara, Erika Eleniak, Dean Stockwell, Crispin Glover, Dennis Hopper, Gary Busey, Seymour Cassel, Bitty Schram	
A P R I L	22	The Inkwell	Touchstone Pictures	Matty Rich (director); Trey Ellis, Paris Qualles (screenplay); Larenz Tate, Jada Pinkett, Joe Morton, Suzzanne Douglass, Glynn Turman, Vanessa Bell Calloway, Adrienne-Joi Johnson, Morris Chestnut, Duane Martin, Mary Alice, Phyllis Yvonne Stickney, Markus Redmond, Perry Moore, Akia Victor, Jade	
A P R I L	29	The Favor	Orion Pictures	Donald Petrie (director); Sara Parriott, Josann McGibbon (screenplay); Harley Jane Kozak, Elizabeth McGovern, Bill Pullman, Brad Pitt, Ken Wahl, Ginger Orsi, Leigh Ann Orsi, Larry Miller	
A P R I L	29	No Escape	Savoy Pictures	Martin Campbell (director); Michael Gaylin, Joel Gross (screenplay); Ray Liotta, Lance Henriksen, Stuart Wilson, Kevin Dillon, Kevin J. O'Connor, Don Henderson, Ian McNeice, Jack Shepherd, Michael Lerner, Ernie Hudson, Russell Kiefel, Brian M. Logan, Cheuk-Fai Chan, David Wenham, David Argue	
A P R I L	29	PCU	20th Century Fox	Hart Bochner (director); Adam Leff, Zak Penn (screenplay); Jeremy Piven, David Spade, Chris Young, Jon Favreau, Alex Desert, Megan Ward, Matt Ross, Stivi Paskoski, Kevin Jubinville, Viveka Davis, Maddie Corman, Jake Busey, Jessica Walter, Colin Fox, George Clinton, Parliament-Funkadelic	
A P R I L	29	When a Man Loves a Woman	Touchstone Pictures	Luis Mandoki (director); Ronald Bass, Al Franken (screenplay); Andy García, Meg Ryan, Lauren Tom, Philip Seymour Hoffman, Tina Majorino, Mae Whitman, Ellen Burstyn, Eugene Roche, Gail Strickland, Steven Brill, Susanna Thompson, LaTanya Richardson Jackson, James Jude Courtney, William Frankfather, Ellen Geer, Rico E. Anderson, Richard Bradford, Al Franken, Holly Lewis	
A P R I L	29	With Honors	Warner Bros. Pictures	Alek Keshishian (director); William Mastrosimone (screenplay); Joe Pesci, Brendan Fraser, Moira Kelly, Patrick Dempsey, Josh Hamilton, Gore Vidal, Lance Norris	
M A Y	6	3 Ninjas Kick Back	TriStar Pictures	Charles T. Kanganis (director); Sang-ok Shin, Mark Saltzman (screenplay); Victor Wong, Max Elliott Slade, Sean Fox, J. Evan Bonifant, Caroline Junko King, Dustin Nguyen, Alan McRae, Margarita Franco, Jason Schombing, Angelo Tiffe, Sab Shimono, Don Stark, Kellye Nakahara, Scott Caudill, Tommy Clark, Jeremy Linson, Brian Wagner, Maital Sabban, Marcus Giamatti, Joey Travolta, Robert Miano, Glen Chin, Killer Khan	
M A Y	6	Being Human	Warner Bros. Pictures	Bill Forsyth (director/screenplay); Robin Williams, John Turturro, Anna Galiena, Vincent D'Onofrio, Hector Elizondo, Lorraine Bracco, Lindsay Crouse, Bill Nighy, Robert Carlyle, Theresa Russell, Simon McBurney, Lizzy McInnerny, William H. Macy, Jonathan Hyde, Ewan McGregor, Kelly Hunter	
M A Y	6	Clean Slate	Metro-Goldwyn-Mayer / The Zanuck Company	Mick Jackson (director); Robert King (screenplay); Dana Carvey, Valeria Golino, James Earl Jones, Kevin Pollak, Michael Murphy, Michael Gambon, Olivia d'Abo, Jayne Brook, Michael Monks, Angela Paton, Vyto Ruginis, Gailard Sartain, Christopher Meloni, Bryan Cranston	
M A Y	6	Dream Lover	Metro-Goldwyn-Mayer / Gramercy Pictures	Nicholas Kazan (director/screenplay); James Spader, Madchen Amick, Fredric Lehne, Bess Armstrong, Larry Miller, Kathleen York, Kate Williamson, Tom Lillard, William Shockley, Joel McKinnon Miller, Archie Lang, Clyde Kusatsu	
M A Y	8	Stephen King's The Stand	ABC / CBS Television Distribution / Laurel Entertainment / DawnField Entertainment / Greengrass Productions	Mick Garris (director); Stephen King (screenplay); Gary Sinise, Molly Ringwald, Jamey Sheridan, Laura San Giacomo, Ruby Dee, Ossie Davis, Miguel Ferrer, Corin Nemec, Matt Frewer, Adam Storke, Ray Walston, Rob Lowe, Bill Fagerbakke, Peter Van Norden, Rick Aviles, Max Wright, Patrick Kilpatrick, Ray McKinnon, Shawnee Smith, Sarah Schaub, William Newman, Kareem Abdul-Jabbar, Warren Frost, John Bloom, Troy Evans, Stephen King, John Landis, Dan Martin, Sam Raimi, Chuck Adamson, Tom Holland, Kathy Bates, Ed Harris, Jeff Goldblum, Sherman Howard, Ken Jenkins, Richard Lineback, Sam Anderson, Jordan Lund, Bill Corso, Wendy Phillips, Kevin Doyle, Bruce MacVittie, Mike Lookinland, Jim Haynie, Michelle King, Bob Yerkes, Hope Marie Carlton, Bridgit Ryan, Kellie Overbey, Cynthia Garris	
M A Y	13	Crooklyn	Universal Pictures / 40 Acres and a Mule Filmworks	Spike Lee (director/screenplay); Joie Susannah Lee, Cinqué Lee (screenplay); Alfre Woodard, Delroy Lindo, David Patrick Kelly, Zelda Harris, Christopher Knowings, José Zúñiga, Isaiah Washington, Spike Lee, Frances Foster, Vondie Curtis-Hall, Bokeem Woodbine, Gary Perez, RuPaul, Dan Grimaldi, Tracy Vilar, Keith Johnson, David Cassidy, Don Cornelius, Shirley Jones, Joie Susannah Lee, Tse-Mach Washington, Carlton Williams, Sharif Rashed, Ivelka Reyes, N. Jeremi Duru, Norman Matlock, Patriece Nelson	
M A Y	13	The Crow	Miramax Films	Alex Proyas (director); David J. Schow, John Shirley (screenplay); Brandon Lee, Ernie Hudson, Rochelle Davis, Michael Wincott, Bai Ling, Sofia Shinas, Anna Levine, David Patrick Kelly, Angel David, Laurence Mason, Michael Massee, Tony Todd, Jon Polito, Bill Raymond, Marco Rodriguez	
M A Y	13	Widows' Peak	Fine Line Features / Rank Film Distributors / Irish Screen	John Irvin (director); Hugh Leonard, Tim Hayes (screenplay); Mia Farrow, Joan Plowright, Natasha Richardson, Adrian Dunbar, Jim Broadbent	
M A Y	20	Even Cowgirls Get the Blues	Fine Line Features	Gus Van Sant (director/screenplay); Uma Thurman, Lorraine Bracco, Angie Dickinson, Noriyuki "Pat" Morita, Keanu Reeves, John Hurt, Rain Phoenix, Roseanne Arnold, Ed Begley Jr., Crispin Glover, Buck Henry, Carol Kane, Sean Young	
M A Y	20	Maverick	Warner Bros. Pictures / Icon Productions	Richard Donner (director); William Goldman (screenplay); Mel Gibson, Jodie Foster, James Garner, Graham Greene, James Coburn, Alfred Molina, Dub Taylor, Dan Hedaya, Paul L. Smith, Geoffrey Lewis, Hal Ketchum, Corey Feldman, Read Morgan, Steve Kahan, Art LaFleur, Leo Gordon, Paul Brinegar, Denver Pyle, Robert Fuller, Doug McClure, Henry Darrow, William Smith, Charles Dierkop, William Marshall, Dennis Fimple, Bert Remsen, Carlene Carter, Waylon Jennings, Kathy Mattea, Reba McEntire, Clint Black, Vince Gill, Janis Gill	
M A Y	20	The Return of Jafar	Walt Disney Home Video	Tad Stones, Alan Zaslove (directors); Kevin Campell, Mirth Js Colao, Bill Motz, Steve Roberts, Dev Ross, Bob Roth, Jan Strnad, Brian Swenlin (screenplay); Scott Weinger, Linda Larkin, Jonathan Freeman, Gilbert Gottfried, Jason Alexander, Dan Castellaneta, Frank Welker, Val Bettin, Jim Cummings, Brad Kane, Liz Callaway, Jeff Bennett, B. J. Ward, Maurice LaMarche	
M A Y	21	White Mile	HBO Pictures	Robert Butler (director); Michael Butler (screenplay); Alan Alda, Peter Gallagher, Robert Loggia, Bruce Altman, Fionnula Flanagan, Jack Gilpin, Ken Jenkins, Dakin Matthews, Don McManus, Robert Picardo, Max Wright, Alice Barden, Tim Choate, Kevin Cooney, Cab Covay, Denny Delk, Nigel Gibbs, Dan Gilvezan, Rebecca Glenn, Jacqueline Kim, Eric Magneson, Danny Manning, Brian Markinson, Robin Goodrin Nordli, Brett Porter, Gina Ravera, Jack Shearer, Ben Sparks, Ken Thorley, Jenifer Wymore	
M A Y	25	Beverly Hills Cop III	Paramount Pictures	John Landis (director); Steven E. de Souza (screenplay); Eddie Murphy, Judge Reinhold, Héctor Elizondo, Timothy Carhart, John Saxon, Theresa Randle, Alan Young, Stephen McHattie, Tracy Melchior, Bronson Pinchot, Gil Hill, Jon Tenney, Lindsey Ginter, Dan Martin, Louis Lombardi, Michael Bowen, Al Green, Hattie Winston, Martha Coolidge, Julie Strain, George Schaefer, Joe Dante, Curtis Williams, Helen Martin, Joey Travolta, Albie Selznick, Tino Insana, Peter Medak, Arthur Hiller, Ray Harryhausen, Robert B. Sherman, Jerry Dunphy, Barbet Schroeder, John Singleton, George Lucas, Thomas Rosales Jr.	
M A Y	27	The Flintstones	Universal Pictures / Amblin Entertainment	Brian Levant (director); Tom S. Parker, Jim Jennewein, Steven E. de Souza (screenplay); John Goodman, Rick Moranis, Elizabeth Perkins, Rosie O'Donnell, Kyle MacLachlan, Halle Berry, Elizabeth Taylor, Mel Blanc, Elaine & Melanie Silver, Hlynur & Marnio Sigurosson, Dann Florek, Richard Moll, Irwin Keyes, Jim Doughan, Harvey Korman, Jonathan Winters, Jack O'Halloran, The B-52's, Sheryl Lee Ralph, Jean Vander Pyl, Laraine Newman, Jay Leno, Alan Blumenfeld, William Hanna, Joseph Barbera, Sam Raimi, E. G. Daily, Phil Proctor	
M A Y	27	Little Buddha	Miramax Films	Bernardo Bertolucci (director); Rudy Wurlitzer, Mark Peploe (screenplay); Keanu Reeves, Bridget Fonda, Chris Isaak, Ying Ruocheng, Rudraprasad Sengupta	
M A Y	31	The Fantastic Four	New Concorde / Constantin Film	Oley Sassone (director); Craig J. Nevius, Kevin Rock (screenplay); Alex Hyde-White, Jay Underwood, Rebecca Staab, Michael Bailey Smith, Carl Ciarfalio, Ian Trigger, Joseph Culp, Kat Green, George Gaynes	
J U N E	1	When the Bough Breaks	Prism Entertainment	Michael Cohn (director/screenplay); Ally Walker, Martin Sheen, Ron Perlman, Tara Subkoff, Robert Knepper, Scott Lawrence, Gina Philips, John P. Connolly	
J U N E	3	The Cowboy Way	Universal Pictures / Imagine Entertainment	Gregg Champion (director); Rob Thompson (screenplay); Woody Harrelson, Kiefer Sutherland, Dylan McDermott, Ernie Hudson, Cara Buono, Marg Helgenberger, Tomas Milian, Luis Guzman, Allison Janney, Angel Caban, Matthew Cowles, Joaquin Martinez, Kristin Baer, Christian Aubert, Emmanuel Xuereb, Francie Swift, Christopher Durang, Jose Zuniga, Travis Tritt	
J U N E	3	The Endless Summer II	New Line Cinema	Bruce Brown (director/screenplay); Dana Brown (screenplay); Robert "Wingnut" Weaver, Pat O'Connell	
J U N E	3	Fear of a Black Hat	The Samuel Goldwyn Company	Rusty Cundieff (director/screenplay); Rusty Cundieff, Larry B. Scott, Mark Christopher Lawrence, Kasi Lemmons, Rose Jackson, Faizon Love, Deezer D, Don Reed, Barry Shabaka Henley, Kurt Loder, Lamont Johnson, Nancy Giles, Doug McHenry, George Jackson, Lance Crouther, Penny Johnson, Darryl Sivad, Eric Laneuville, Monique Gabrielle	
J U N E	3	Renaissance Man	Touchstone Pictures / Cinergi Pictures	Penny Marshall (director); Jim Burnstein (screenplay); Danny DeVito, Gregory Hines, James Remar, Cliff Robertson, Ed Begley Jr., Lillo Brancato, Stacey Dash, Kadeem Hardison, Richard T. Jones, Khalil Kain, Peter Simmons, Gregory Sporleder, Mark Wahlberg, Alanna Ubach, Isabella Hofmann	
J U N E	3	The Princess and the Goblin	Hemdale Film Corporation / J&M Entertainment	József Gémes (director); Robin Lyons (screenplay); Joss Ackland, Claire Bloom, Roy Kinnear, Sally Ann Marsh, Rik Mayall, Peggy Mount	
J U N E	10	City Slickers II: The Legend of Curly's Gold	Columbia Pictures / Castle Rock Entertainment	Paul Weiland (director); Lowell Ganz, Babaloo Mandel, Billy Crystal (screenplay); Billy Crystal, Daniel Stern, Jon Lovitz, Jack Palance, Noble Willingham, Patricia Wettig, Pruitt Taylor Vince, Bill McKinney, David Paymer, Josh Mostel, Beth Grant, Jayne Meadows, Frank Welker	
J U N E	10	Speed	20th Century Fox	Jan de Bont (director); Graham Yost (screenplay); Keanu Reeves, Dennis Hopper, Sandra Bullock, Joe Morton, Jeff Daniels, Alan Ruck, Carlos Carrasco, Glenn Plummer, Richard Lineback, Beth Grant, Hawthorne James, Richard Schiff, John Capodice	
J U N E	17	Getting Even with Dad	Metro-Goldwyn-Mayer	Howard Deutch (director); Tom S. Parker, Jim Jennewein (screenplay); Macaulay Culkin, Ted Danson, Glenne Headly, Saul Rubinek, Gailard Sartain, Kathleen Wilhoite, Hector Elizondo, Sydney Walker, Dann Florek, Scott Beach	
J U N E	17	Wolf	Columbia Pictures	Mike Nichols (director); Jim Harrison, Wesley Strick (screenplay); Jack Nicholson, Michelle Pfeiffer, James Spader, Kate Nelligan, Richard Jenkins, Christopher Plummer, Eileen Atkins, David Hyde Pierce, Om Puri, Ron Rifkin, Prunella Scales, Brian Markinson, Peter Gerety, Bradford English, Stewart J. Zully, Thomas F. Duffy, David Schwimmer, Allison Janney, Lia Chang	
J U N E	24	The Lion King	Walt Disney Pictures	Roger Allers, Rob Minkoff (director); Irene Mecchi, Jonathan Roberts, Linda Woolverton (screenplay); Matthew Broderick, James Earl Jones, Jeremy Irons, Jonathan Taylor Thomas, Moira Kelly, Nathan Lane, Ernie Sabella, Rowan Atkinson, Robert Guillaume, Madge Sinclair, Whoopi Goldberg, Cheech Marin, Jim Cummings, Frank Welker, Cathy Cavadini, Phil Proctor, Sally Dworsky, John Lasseter, Thurl Ravenscroft, Brian Tochi, Jason Weaver, Joseph Williams, Niketa Calame, Zoe Leader, Judi Durand, Daamen Krall, David McCharen, Linda Phillips, David Randolph, Laura Williams	
J U N E	24	A Man in Uniform	IRS Media	David Wellington (director/screenplay); Tom McCamus, Brigitte Bako, Kevin Tighe, Daniel MacIvor, Henry Czerny, Albert Schultz, J. D. Nicholsen, Matthew Ferguson, Michael Hogan, David Hemblen	
J U N E	24	Wyatt Earp	Warner Bros. Pictures / Tig Productions	Lawrence Kasdan (director/screenplay); Dan Gordon (screenplay); Kevin Costner, Dennis Quaid, Gene Hackman, JoBeth Williams, Linden Ashby, Jeff Fahey, Joanna Going, Annabeth Gish, Mark Harmon, Bill Pullman, Isabella Rossellini, Mare Winningham, Jim Caviezel, John Doe, Michael Madsen, Catherine O'Hara, Tom Sizemore, James Gammon, Karen Grassle, Rex Linn, Gabriel Folse, Mackenzie Astin, Randle Mell, Adam Baldwin, Lewis Smith, Betty Buckley, Alison Elliott, Tea Leoni, Martin Kove, David Andrews, Ian Bohen, Todd Allen, John Dennis Johnston, Jack Kehler, Kirk Fox, Norman Howell, Kris Kamm, John Lawlor, Hugh Ross, Michael McGrady, Rockne Tarkington, Matt O'Toole, Luce Rains, Brett Cullen, Owen Roizman, Jonathan Kasdan, Lawrence Kasdan	
J U N E	25	Blind Justice	HBO Pictures	Richard Spence (director); Daniel Knauf (screenplay); Armand Assante, Elisabeth Shue, Robert Davi, Adam Baldwin, Ian McElhinney, Danny Nucci, M. C. Gainey, Titus Welliver, Jack Black, Michael O'Neill, Douglas Roberts, Gary Carlos Cervantes, Jesse Dabson, Jimmy Herman, Clayton Landey, James Oscar Lee, Daniel O'Haco, Jeff O'Haco, Jason Reins-Rodriguez, Ric San Nicholas, Forrie J. Smith, Michael A. Goorjian, Tom Hodges	
J U N E	29	I Love Trouble	Touchstone Pictures / Caravan Pictures	Charles Shyer (director/screenplay); Nancy Meyers (screenplay); Julia Roberts, Nick Nolte, Saul Rubinek, James Rebhorn, Robert Loggia, Kelly Rutherford, Olympia Dukakis, Marsha Mason, Eugene Levy, Charles Martin Smith, Dan Butler, Paul Gleason, Jane Adams, Lisa Lu, Nora Dunn, Megan Cavanagh, Clark Gregg, Anna Holbrook, Jay Wolpert, Andy Milder, Dorothy Lyman, Keith Gordon, Joseph D'Onofrio, Barry Sobel, Frankie Faison, Stuart Pankin, James 'Kimo' Wills, Patrick St. Esprit, Paul Hirsch, Jessica Lundy, Nestor Serrano, Robin Duke, Bruce A. Block, Hallie Meyers-Shyer	
J U N E	29	Little Big League	Columbia Pictures / Castle Rock Entertainment	Andrew Scheinman (director); Gregory K. Pincus (screenplay); Luke Edwards, Timothy Busfield, John Ashton, Ashley Crow, Kevin Dunn, Billy L. Sullivan, Miles Feulner, Jonathan Silverman, Dennis Farina, Jason Robards, Wolfgang Bodison, Duane Davis, Leon "Bull" Durham, Kevin Elster, Joseph Latimore, Brad Lesley, John Minch, Michael Papajohn, Scott Patterson, Troy Startoni, Antonio Lewis Todd, John Gordon, Jeff Garlin, Allan Wasserman, Teddy Bergman, Allen Hamilton, John Beasley, O'Neal Compton, Steve Cochran, Jodie Fisher, Tony Denman, Vincent Kartheiser, Brock Pierce, Ken Griffey Jr., Lou Piniella, Mickey Tettleton, Iván Rodríguez, Sandy Alomar Jr., Eric Anthony, Carlos Baerga, Alex Fernandez, Randy Johnson, Wally Joyner, Dave Magadan, Lenny Webster, Paul O'Neill, Rafael Palmeiro, Dean Palmer, Tim Raines, Chris Berman	

== July–September ==
Opening		Title	Production company	Cast and crew	Ref.
J U L Y	1	Baby's Day Out	20th Century Fox / Hughes Entertainment	Patrick Read Johnson (director); John Hughes (screenplay); Joe Mantegna, Lara Flynn Boyle, Joe Pantoliano, Brian Haley, Adam Robert Worton, Jacob Joseph Worton, Matthew Glave, Cynthia Nixon, Fred Dalton Thompson, John Neville, Eddie Bracken, Dawn Maxey, Anna Thomson	
J U L Y	1	Blown Away	Metro-Goldwyn-Mayer	Stephen Hopkins (director); John Rice, Joe Batteer, Jay Roach (screenplay); Jeff Bridges, Tommy Lee Jones, Suzy Amis, Forest Whitaker, Lloyd Bridges, Stephi Lineburg, John Finn, Caitlin Clarke, Christofer de Oni, Loyd Catlett, Ruben Santiago-Hudson, Cuba Gooding Jr., Ed O'Keefe, Mike Starr	
J U L Y	1	The Shadow	Universal Pictures	Russell Mulcahy (director); David Koepp (screenplay); Alec Baldwin, John Lone, Penelope Ann Miller, Peter Boyle, Ian McKellen, Tim Curry, Jonathan Winters, Sab Shimono, Andre Gregory, James Hong, Joseph Maher, John Kapelos, Max Wright, Aaron Lustig, Ethan Phillips, Wesley Mann, Larry Hankin, Al Leong, Gerald Okamura, Abraham Benrubi, Steve Hytner, Lily Mariye, Patrick Fischler, Kate McGregor-Stewart, James Lew, Darryl Chan, Jimmy Taenaka, Frank Welker	
J U L Y	6	Forrest Gump	Paramount Pictures	Robert Zemeckis (director); Eric Roth (screenplay); Tom Hanks, Robin Wright, Gary Sinise, Mykelti Williamson, Sally Field, Michael Conner Humphreys, Hanna R. Hall, Sam Anderson, Peter Dobson, Siobhan J. Fallon, Christopher Jones, Sonny Shroyer, Brett Rice, Afemo Omilami, John Voldstad, Grand L. Bush, Michael Jace, Conor Kennelly, Teddy Lane Jr., Geoffrey Blake, Dick Cavett, Joe Alaskey, Haley Joel Osment, Neil Armstrong, Arthur Bremer, Dick Clark, John Connally, Gerald Ford, Bob Hope, Lyndon B. Johnson, John F. Kennedy, Robert F. Kennedy, John Lennon, Richard Nixon, Elvis Presley, Ronald Reagan, Kurt Russell, Mary Ellen Trainor, George Wallace	
J U L Y	6	That's Entertainment! III	Metro-Goldwyn-Mayer	Bud Friedgen, Michael J. Sheridan (directors/screenplay); June Allyson, Cyd Charisse, Lena Horne, Howard Keel, Gene Kelly, Ann Miller, Debbie Reynolds, Mickey Rooney, Esther Williams, Fred Astaire, Lucille Ball, Jack Benny, Ingrid Bergman, Ray Bolger, Lucille Bremer, Jack Buchanan, Billie Burke, Claudette Colbert, Joan Crawford, Xavier Cugat, Arlene Dahl, Marion Davies, Doris Day, Gloria DeHaven, Marlene Dietrich, Marie Dressler, Jimmy Durante, Buddy Ebsen, Nelson Eddy, Cliff Edwards, Vera-Ellen, Nanette Fabray, Greta Garbo, Ava Gardner, Judy Garland, Betty Garrett, Greer Garson, Paulette Goddard, Dolores Gray, Kathryn Grayson, Jean Harlow, Katharine Hepburn, Betty Hutton, Louis Jourdan, Buster Keaton, Grace Kelly, Hedy Lamarr, Angela Lansbury, Peter Lawford, Vivien Leigh, Oscar Levant, Carole Lombard, Myrna Loy, Jeanette MacDonald, Tony Martin, Joan McCracken, Carmen Miranda, Marilyn Monroe, Ricardo Montalbán, Polly Moran, Jules Munshin, George Murphy, Donald O'Connor, Janis Paige, Eleanor Powell, Jane Powell, Elvis Presley, Luise Rainer, Ginger Rogers, Norma Shearer, Frank Sinatra, Ann Sothern, Elizabeth Taylor, Robert Taylor, Lana Turner, Nancy Walker, Esther Williams, Robert Young, Tom Cat, Jerry Mouse	
J U L Y	8	Pentathlon	Live Entertainment	Bruce Malmuth (director); Misha Suslov (screenplay); Dolph Lundgren, David Soul, Renée Coleman, Roger E. Mosley, Daniel Riordan, Philip Bruns, Bruce Malmuth, Mel Stewart, Barry Lynch, Evan James, David Drummond, Gerald Hopkins, Erik Holland, Anthony T. Pennello, Andreas Reinl	
J U L Y	15	Angels in the Outfield	Walt Disney Pictures / Caravan Pictures	William Dear (director); Holly Goldberg Sloan (screenplay); Danny Glover, Tony Danza, Brenda Fricker, Ben Johnson, Jay O. Sanders, Joseph Gordon-Levitt, Christopher Lloyd, Taylor Negron, Tony Longo, Neal McDonough, Stoney Jackson, Adrien Brody, Tim Conlon, Matthew McConaughey, Israel Juarbe, Dermot Mulroney, Robert Clohessy, Mitchell Page, Carney Lansford, Bill Dear, Lew Temple, Milton Davis Jr., Albert Garcia, Danny Walcoff, O.B. Babbs, Mark Cole, Jonathan Proby	
J U L Y	15	Mi Vida Loca	Sony Pictures	Allison Anders (director/screenplay); Angel Aviles, Seidy Lopez, Jacob Vargas, Nelida Lopez, Marlo Marron, Christina Solis, Arthur Esquer, Julian Reyes, Gabriel Gonzales, Magali Alvarado, Jesse Borrego, Bertila Damas, Danny Trejo, Salma Hayek, Los Lobos, Jason Lee, Spike Jonze	
J U L Y	15	True Lies	20th Century Fox / Lightstorm Entertainment	James Cameron (director/screenplay); Arnold Schwarzenegger, Jamie Lee Curtis, Tom Arnold, Bill Paxton, Tia Carrere, Art Malik, Eliza Dushku, Grant Heslov, Charlton Heston, Marshall Manesh, James Allen, Ofer Samra	
J U L Y	20	The Client	Warner Bros. Pictures / Regency Enterprises	Joel Schumacher (director); Akiva Goldsman, Robert Getchell (screenplay); Susan Sarandon, Tommy Lee Jones, Brad Renfro, Mary-Louise Parker, Anthony LaPaglia, David Speck, J.T. Walsh, Anthony Heald, Bradley Whitford, Kim Coates, Anthony Edwards, Ossie Davis, William Sanderson, Walter Olkewicz, Will Patton, Ron Dean, Dan Castellaneta, William H. Macy, John Diehl, William Richert, Micole Mercurio, Kimberly Scott, Andy Stahl, Amy Hathaway, Jo Harvey Allen, Macon McCalman, John Fink, George Klein, Nat Robinson, Mark Cabus, Will Zahrn	
J U L Y	21	Dragonworld	Paramount Pictures	Ted Nicolaou (director/screenplay); Suzanne Glazener Naha (screenplay); Sam Mackenzie, Courtland Mead, Brittney Powell, John Calvin, Lila Kaye, John Woodvine, Andrew Keir, Janet Henfrey, Richard Trask, Jim Dunk	
J U L Y	22	Lassie	Paramount Pictures	Daniel Petrie (director); Eric Knight, Matthew Jacobs, Gary Ross, Elizabeth Anderson (screenplay); Tom Guiry, Helen Slater, Jon Tenney, Frederic Forrest, Richard Farnsworth, Michelle Williams, Charlie Hofheimer, Brittany Boyd, Joe Inscoe, Yvonne Brisendine, Clayton Barclay Jones, Jody Smith Strickler, Margaret Peery	
J U L Y	22	North	Columbia Pictures / Castle Rock Entertainment	Rob Reiner (director); Alan Zweibel, Andrew Scheinman (screenplay); Elijah Wood, Jon Lovitz, Jason Alexander, Alan Arkin, Dan Aykroyd, Kathy Bates, Scarlett Johansson, Faith Ford, Graham Greene, Julia Louis-Dreyfus, Reba McEntire, John Ritter, Abe Vigoda, Bruce Willis, Alexander Godunov, Kelly McGillis, Keone Young, Lauren Tom, Ben Stein, Taylor Fry, Alana Austin, Jussie Smollett, Robert Costanzo, Rosalind Chao, Alan Rachins, Richard Belzer, Marc Shaiman, Alan Zweibel, Chuck Cooper, Matthew Arkin, Marc Coppola, Colette Bryce, Lola Pashalinski, Helen Hanft, Lillias White, Carmit Bachar, James Harkness, Brynn Hartman, George Kee Cheung, Dan Grimaldi, Matthew McCurley, Jesse Ziegler	
J U L Y	23	Doomsday Gun	HBO Showcase	Robert Young (director); Walter Bernstein, Lionel Chetwynd (screenplay); Frank Langella, Alan Arkin, Kevin Spacey, Michael Kitchen, Francesca Annis, Aharon Ipalé, Zia Mohyeddin, Tony Goldwyn, James Fox, Rupert Graves, Clive Owen, Murray Melvin, Marianne Denicourt, Alexandra Vandernoot, Roger Hammond, Georgia Reece, Richard Garnett, David Healy, Drew Schofield, Edward Highmore, Nigel Hastings, John Flanagan, David McAlister, Trevor Bannister, Ben Stockman, Mark Ryan, Al Gore, Saddam Hussein, Ayatollah Khomeini	
J U L Y	29	Barcelona	Fine Line Features	Whit Stillman (director/screenplay); Taylor Nichols, Chris Eigeman, Tushka Bergen, Mira Sorvino, Pep Munne, Hellena Schmied, Nuria Badia, Jack Gilpin, Thomas Gibson	
J U L Y	29	Black Beauty	Warner Bros. Pictures	Caroline Thompson (director/screenplay); Andrew Knott, Sean Bean, David Thewlis, Jim Carter, Peter Davison, Alun Armstrong, John McEnery, Eleanor Bron, Peter Cook, Keeley Flanders, Niall O'Brien, Alan Cumming, Docs Keepin Time, Ian Kelsey	
J U L Y	29	Foreign Student	Gramercy Pictures	Eva Sereny (director); Menno Meyjes (screenplay); Robin Givens, Marco Hofschneider, Rick Johnson, Charlotte Ross, Edward Herrmann, Jack Coleman, Charles S. Dutton, Hinton Battle, Anthony Herrera, Michael Reilly Burke, Bob Child, David Long, Ruth Williamson, Michael Goodwin, Jon Hendricks, Andy Park, Brendan Medlin, Kevin A. Parrott, Cliff McMullen, Jane Beard, Sutton Knight, John Habberton, Jonathan Sale	
J U L Y	29	It Could Happen to You	TriStar Pictures	Andrew Bergman (director); Jane Anderson (screenplay); Nicolas Cage, Bridget Fonda, Rosie Perez, Stanley Tucci, Seymour Cassel, Isaac Hayes, Wendell Pierce, Victor Rojas, J.E. Freeman, Red Buttons, Richard Jenkins, Charles Busch, Beatrice Winde, Vincent Pastore, Emily Deschanel, Willie Colón, Frank Pellegrino, Ann Dowd, Lim Kay Tong	
J U L Y	29	The Mask	New Line Cinema	Chuck Russell (director); Mike Werb (screenplay); Jim Carrey, Peter Riegert, Peter Greene, Amy Yasbeck, Richard Jeni, Cameron Diaz, Orestes Matacena, Jim Doughan, Ben Stein, Reginald E. Cathey, Denis Forest, Blake Clark, Tim Bagley, Joely Fisher, Kevin Grevioux, Robert Keith, Robert O'Reilly, Meadow Williams, Henry Kingi, Garret Sato, Jeep Swenson, Jeremy Roberts, Ivory Ocean, William Daniel Mielcarek, Eamonn Roche, Nancy Fish, Johnny Williams, Nils Allen Stewart, Susan Boyd	
J U L Y	31	Roswell	Showtime Networks / Viacom Pictures / Citadel Entertainment	Jeremy Kagan (director/screenplay); Arthur L. Kopit (screenplay); Kyle MacLachlan, Martin Sheen, Dwight Yoakam, Xander Berkeley, Bob Gunton, Kim Greist, Peter MacNicol, John M. Jackson, Nick Searcy, J.D. Daniels, Charles Hallahan, Ray McKinnon, Eugene Roche, Charles Martin Smith, Gary Bullock, Arthur L. Kopit, Lisa Waltz, Warren Munson, Hansford Rowe, Richard Fancy, Paul Davids, Philip Baker Hall, Lawrence Dobkin, Arthur Hiller, Parley Baer, Bruce Gray	
A U G U S T	3	Clear and Present Danger	Paramount Pictures	Phillip Noyce (director); Donald E. Stewart, Steven Zaillian, John Milius (screenplay); Harrison Ford, Willem Dafoe, Anne Archer, James Earl Jones, Benjamin Bratt, Raymond Cruz, Joaquim de Almeida, Miguel Sandoval, Harris Yulin, Henry Czerny, Donald Moffat, Greg Germann, Reed Diamond, Reg E. Cathey, Clark Gregg, Rex Linn, Thora Birch, Ann Magnuson, Belita Moreno, Dean Jones, Ellen Geer, Hope Lange, Patrick Bauchau, Ted Raimi, Vondie Curtis-Hall, Victor Palmieri, Ken Howard, Chris Conrad, Vaughn Armstrong, John Putch, Colleen Flynn, Cam Brainard, Brendan Ford, Michael Jace, Cameron Thor, Harley Venton, Miguel Perez, Juan Carlos Colombo, Blanca Guerra, Mario Iván Martínez, Alejandro Bracho, Diana Sowle, Kamala Lopez, Elizabeth Dennehy, Patricia Belcher, Aaron Lustig, Kim Flowers, Lynne Marie Stewart, Tom Bower, Henry Kingi Jr., Phillip Noyce, Jorge Luke, Jaime Gomez, Tom Tammi, Tim Grimm	
A U G U S T	3	Eat Drink Man Woman	The Samuel Goldwyn Company	Ang Lee (director/screenplay); James Schamus, Hui-Ling Wang (screenplay); Sihung Lung, Kuei-Mei Yang, Chien-lien Wu, Yu-Wen Wang, Winston Chao, Sylvia Chang, Ah-Leh Gua	
A U G U S T	5	Airheads	20th Century Fox	Michael Lehmann (director); Rich Wilkes (screenplay); Brendan Fraser, Steve Buscemi, Adam Sandler, Chris Farley, Ernie Hudson, Michael McKean, Judd Nelson, Michael Richards, Joe Mantegna, Amy Locane, Nina Siemaszko, Marshall Bell, Reg E. Cathey, David Arquette, Tracey Ullman, Michelle Hurst, Harold Ramis, Allen Covert, Rob Zombie, Kurt Loder, Lemmy Kilmister, Rich Wilkes, John Melendez, Vinnie DeRamus	
A U G U S T	5	The Little Rascals	Universal Pictures / Amblin Entertainment	Penelope Spheeris (director/screenplay); Paul Guay, Stephen Mazur, Mike Scott, Robert Wolterstorff (screenplay); Bug Hall, Travis Tedford, Ross Elliot Bagley, Blake McIver Ewing, Courtland Mead, Mel Brooks, Whoopi Goldberg, Daryl Hannah, Reba McEntire, Mary-Kate and Ashley Olsen, Raven-Symoné, Lea Thompson, Donald Trump, George Wendt, Eric "Sparky" Edwards, Charles Noland, John Wesley, Joseph Ashton, E.G. Daily, Katie Volding, Brittany Ashton Holmes, Kevin Jamal Woods, Zachary Mabry, Sam Saletta, Blake Jeremy Collins, Jordan Warkol, Juliette Brewer, Heather Karasek, Dan Carton, Alexandra Monroe King, Zoe Oakes	
A U G U S T	12	Corrina, Corrina	New Line Cinema	Jessie Nelson (director/screenplay); Whoopi Goldberg, Ray Liotta, Tina Majorino, Jenifer Lewis, Larry Miller, Joan Cusack, Wendy Crewson, Don Ameche, Erica Yohn, Lynette Walden, Lucy Webb, Marcus Toji, Brent Spiner, Patrika Darbo, Louis Mustillo, Bryan Gordon, Curtis Williams, Harold Sylvester, Steven Williams, Asher Metchik, Courtland Mead, Lin Shaye, Jevetta Steele, K.T. Stevens, Roz Witt, Nat King Cole, Shari Lewis, Johnny Olson, Jonathan Winters	
A U G U S T	12	In the Army Now	Hollywood Pictures	Daniel Petrie Jr. (director); Ken Kaufman, Stu Krieger, Daniel Petrie Jr., Fax Bahr, Adam Small (screenplay); Pauly Shore, Lori Petty, David Alan Grier, Andy Dick, Esai Morales, Lynn Whitfield, Art LaFleur, Fabiana Udenio, Glenn Morshower, Beau Billingslea, Peter Spellos, Brendan Fraser, Saul Owens	
A U G U S T	12	The Next Karate Kid	Columbia Pictures	Christopher Cain (director); Mark Lee (screenplay); Hilary Swank, Pat Morita, Michael Ironside, Constance Towers, Chris Conrad, Michael Cavalieri, Walton Goggins, Arsenio 'Sonny' Trinidad, Frank Welker	
A U G U S T	19	Andre	Paramount Pictures / The Kushner-Locke Company	George Miller (director); Dana Baratta (screenplay); Tina Majorino, Keith Carradine, Keith Szarabajka, Chelsea Field, Aidan Pendleton, Shane Meier, Joshua Jackson, Shirley Broderick, Andrea Libman, Joy Coghill, Gregory Edward Smith, Jay Brazeau	
A U G U S T	19	Blankman	Columbia Pictures	Mike Binder (director); Damon Wayans, J. F. Lawton (screenplay); Damon Wayans, David Alan Grier, Robin Givens, Jon Polito, Jason Alexander, Lynne Thigpen, Christopher Lawford, Nick Corello, Harris Peet, Arsenio Hall, Tony Cox, Michael Wayans, Damon Wayans Jr.	
A U G U S T	19	Color of Night	Hollywood Pictures / Cinergi Pictures	Richard Rush (director); Billy Ray, Matthew Chapman (screenplay); Bruce Willis, Jane March, Rubén Blades, Lesley Ann Warren, Scott Bakula, Brad Dourif, Lance Henriksen, Kevin J. O'Connor, Eriq La Salle, Andrew Lowery, Kathleen Wilhoite, Jeff Corey, Shirley Knight	
A U G U S T	19	Killing Zoe	October Films	Roger Avary (director/screenplay); Eric Stoltz, Jean-Hugues Anglade, Julie Delpy, Gary Kemp, Kario Salem, Tai Thai, Bruce Ramsay, Salvator Xuereb, Cecilia Peck, Ron Jeremy Hyatt, David Richard Thompson, Djimon Hounsou	
A U G U S T	20	The Enemy Within	HBO Pictures	Jonathan Darby (director); Rod Serling (screenplay); Forest Whitaker, Sam Waterston, Dana Delany, Jason Robards, Josef Sommer, George Dzundza, Isabel Glasser, Dakin Matthews, William O'Leary, Lisa Summerour, Denise Dowse, Chuck Hicks, Barry Lynch, Ryan McDonald, Willie Norwood Jr., Anthony Peck, Lawrence Pressman, George Marshall Ruge, Michael B. Silver, Rory J. Aylward, Greg Brickman, David Q. Combs, Patricia Donaldson, Yolanda Gaskins, Jayne Hess, Leonard Kelly-Young, Archie Lang, Steve Ruge	
A U G U S T	24	The Advocate	Miramax Films / BBC / CiBy 2000	Leslie Megahey (director/screenplay); Colin Firth, Ian Holm, Donald Pleasence, Amina Annabi, Nicol Williamson, Michael Gough, Sophie Dix, Harriet Walter, Jim Carter, Lysette Anthony, Vincent Grass, Elizabeth Spriggs, Justin Chadwick, Dave Atkins, Vernon Dobtcheff, Sami Bouajila, Joanna Dunham	
A U G U S T	24	Fresh	Miramax Films	Boaz Yakin (director); Boaz Yakin (screenplay); Sean Nelson, Giancarlo Esposito, Samuel L. Jackson, N'Bushe Wright, Ron Brice, Jean-Claude La Marre, Jose Zuniga, Luis Lantigua, Yul Vazquez, Cheryl Freeman, Anthony Thomas, Curtis McClarin, Charles Malik Whitfield, Victor Gonzalez, Guillermo Diaz, Anthony Ruiz, Natima Bradley, Elizabeth Rodriguez	
A U G U S T	26	Camp Nowhere	Hollywood Pictures	Jonathan Prince (director); Andrew Kurtzman, Eliot Wald (screenplay); Christopher Lloyd, Jonathan Jackson, Wendy Makkena, M. Emmet Walsh, Melody Kay, Andrew Keegan, Marnette Patterson, Thomas F. Wilson, Hillary Tuck, Allison Mack, Jessica Alba, Michael Zorek, Nathan Cavaleri, Heather DeLoach, Peter Scolari, Ray Baker, Kate Mulgrew, John Putch, Burgess Meredith, Maryedith Burrell, Genie Francis, Jonathan Frakes, Peter Onorati	
A U G U S T	26	It's Pat	Touchstone Pictures	Adam Bernstein (director); Julia Sweeney, Jim Emerson, Stephen Hibbert (screenplay); Julia Sweeney, Dave Foley, Charles Rocket, Kathy Griffin, Julie Hayden, Timothy Stack, Mary Scheer, Beverly Leech, Tim Meadows, Phil LaMarr, Larry Hankin, Kathy Najimy, Jerry Tondo, Mitch Pileggi, Michael Yama, Katie Wright, Arleen Sorkin, Camille Paglia, Ween	
A U G U S T	26	Natural Born Killers	Warner Bros. Pictures / Regency Enterprises / Ixlitan Productions	Oliver Stone (director/screenplay); Dave Veloz, Richard Rutowski (screenplay); Woody Harrelson, Juliette Lewis, Robert Downey Jr., Tommy Lee Jones, Tom Sizemore, Arliss Howard, Rodney Dangerfield, Edie McClurg, Sean Stone, Russell Means, Lanny Flaherty, Evan Handler, Balthazar Getty, Richard Lineback, Kirk Baltz, Steven Wright, Pruitt Taylor Vince, Joe Grifasi, Everett Quinton, Marshall Bell, Peter Crombie, Grand L. Bush, Louis Lombardi, Dale Dye, Corey Everson, O-Lan Jones, James Gammon, Mark Harmon, Adrien Brody, David Pasquesi, Jared Harris, Terrylene Sacchetti, Maria Pitillo, Josh Richman, Matthew Faber, Saemi Nakamura, Seiko Yoshida, Red West, Jeremiah Bitsui, Glen Chin, Carl Ciarfalio, Robert Jordan, Chris Chavis, Hank Corwin, Paul Dillon, Barry Hardy, Boris Karloff, O. J. Simpson	
A U G U S T	26	Police Academy: Mission to Moscow	Warner Bros. Pictures	Alan Metter (director); Randolph Davis, Michele S. Chodos (screenplay); George Gaynes, Michael Winslow, David Graf, Leslie Easterbrook, G. W. Bailey, Charlie Schlatter, Christopher Lee, Ron Perlman, Claire Forlani, Gregg Berger, Maria Vinogradova, Nikolai Pastukhov, Allyn Ann McLerie, Lonnie Burr, Stuart Nisbet, David St. James, Alexander Skorokhod, Vladimir Dolinsky, Richard Israel, Pamela Guest	
A U G U S T	26	Shake, Rattle and Rock!	Showtime / Spelling Films International	Allan Arkush (director); Trish Soodik (screenplay); Renée Zellweger, Howie Mandel, Patricia Childress, Max Perlich, Latanyia Baldwin, Necia Bray, Josina Elder, Wendi Williams, Gerrit Graham, John Doe, James Intveld, Riki Rachtman, Nora Dunn, Mary Woronov, Dey Young, P.J. Soles, Jenifer Lewis, Ruth Brown, Stephen Furst, Julianna Raye, Dick Miller, William Schallert, Ron Jackson, Paul Anka, Dominic Keating	
A U G U S T	26	Wagons East!	TriStar Pictures / Carolco Pictures	Peter Markle (director); Matthew Carlson (screenplay); John Candy, Richard Lewis, John C. McGinley, Ellen Greene, Robert Picardo, Joel McKinnon Miller, Rodney A. Grant, Ed Lauter, Charles Rocket, William Sanderson, Abraham Benrubi, Thomas F. Duffy, Russell Means, Lochlyn Munro, Melinda Culea, Don Lake, Gailard Sartain, Ethan Phillips	
A U G U S T	31	Milk Money	Paramount Pictures / The Kennedy/Marshall Company	Richard Benjamin (director); John Mattson (screenplay); Melanie Griffith, Ed Harris, Malcolm McDowell, Anne Heche, Philip Bosco, Casey Siemaszko, Adam LaVorgna, Michael Patrick Carter, Brian Christopher, Margaret Nagle, Kevin Youkilis	
S E P T E M B E R	2	A Simple Twist of Fate	Touchstone Pictures	Gillies MacKinnon (director); Steve Martin (screenplay); Steve Martin, Gabriel Byrne, Laura Linney, Stephen Baldwin, Catherine O'Hara, Michael Des Barres, Alana Austin	
S E P T E M B E R	2	There Goes My Baby	Nelson Entertainment	Floyd Mutrux (director/screenplay); Dermot Mulroney, Rick Schroder, Noah Wyle, Kelli Williams, Lucy Deakins	
S E P T E M B E R	3	Scooby-Doo! in Arabian Nights	Turner Entertainment / Hanna-Barbera / Studio B Productions	Jun Falkenstein, Joanna Romersa (directors); Gordon Kent (screenplay); Don Messick, Casey Kasem, Eddie Deezen, Greg Burson, Allan Melvin, Charlie Adler, Brian Cummings, Nick Jameson, Jennifer Hale, John Kassir, Rob Paulsen, Paul Eiding, Tony Jay, Kath Soucie, Maurice LaMarche	
S E P T E M B E R	9	A Good Man in Africa	Gramercy Pictures	Bruce Beresford (director); William Boyd (screenplay); Colin Friels, Sean Connery, Joanne Whalley-Kilmer, John Lithgow, Louis Gossett Jr., Diana Rigg, Sarah-Jane Fenton, Simon Laverie, Maynard Eziashi	
S E P T E M B E R	9	Rapa-Nui	Warner Bros. Pictures / Tig Productions	Kevin Reynolds (director); Jason Scott Lee, Esai Morales, Sandrine Holt, Eru Potaka-Dewes, Gordon Hatfield	
S E P T E M B E R	9	Trial by Jury	Warner Bros. Pictures / Morgan Creek Productions	Heywood Gould (director/screenplay); Jordan Katz (screenplay); Joanne Whalley-Kilmer, Armand Assante, Gabriel Byrne, William Hurt, Kathleen Quinlan, Margaret Whitton, Ed Lauter, Richard Portnow, Lisa Arrindell Anderson, Graham Jarvis, William R. Moses, Joe Santos, Beau Starr, Stuart Whitman, Kevin Ramsey, Fiona Gallagher, Kay Hawtrey, Ardon Bess, Karina Arroyave, Andrew Sabiston, Paul Soles, Damon D'Oliveira, Andrew Miller, Ron Hale	
S E P T E M B E R	9	What Happened Was	The Samuel Goldwyn Company	Tom Noonan (director/screenplay); Karen Sillas, Tom Noonan	
S E P T E M B E R	14	The Many Adventures of Winnie the Pooh (re-release)	Walt Disney Pictures	John Lounsbery, Wolfgang Reitherman (directors); Larry Clemmons, Ralph Wright, Vance Gerry, Xavier Atencio, Ken Anderson, Julius Svendsen, Ted Berman, Eric Cleworth (screenplay); Sterling Holloway, John Fiedler, Junius Matthews, Paul Winchell, Howard Morris, Bruce Reitherman, Jon Walmsley, Timothy Turner, Ralph Wright, Clint Howard, Barbara Luddy, Hal Smith, Sebastian Cabot, Dori Whitaker	
S E P T E M B E R	14	Quiz Show	Hollywood Pictures	Robert Redford (director/screenplay); John Turturro, Rob Morrow, Ralph Fiennes, David Paymer, Paul Scofield, Hank Azaria, Christopher McDonald, Johann Carlo, Elizabeth Wilson, Allan Rich, Mira Sorvino, George Martin, Paul Guilfoyle, Griffin Dunne, Martin Scorsese, Neil Ross, Barry Levinson, Shawn Batten, Jeffrey Nordling, Carole Shelley, Calista Flockhart, Ben Shenkman, Timothy Busfield, Jack Gilpin, Bruce Altman, Ernie Sabella, Debra Monk, Mario Cantone, Timothy Britten Parker, Matt Keeslar, Harriet Sansom Harris, Eddie Korbich, Vince O'Brien, Chuck Adamson, Illeana Douglas, Gretchen Egolf, Stephen Pearlman, Douglas McGrath, Kelly Coffield Park, Joe Lisi, William Fichtner, Ethan Hawke, Katherine Borowitz, Hélène Cardona, Stas Kmiec, Ron Ostrow, Steve Ryan, Jonathan Marc Sherman	
S E P T E M B E R	16	Blue Sky	Orion Pictures / Metro-Goldwyn-Mayer	Tony Richardson (director); Rama Laurie Stagner, Arlene Sarner, Jerry Leichtling (screenplay); Jessica Lange, Tommy Lee Jones, Powers Boothe, Carrie Snodgress, Amy Locane, Chris O'Donnell, Anna Klemp, Mitchell Ryan, Dale Dye, Timothy Scott, Annie Ross, Gary Bullock, Michael McClendon	
S E P T E M B E R	16	The New Age	Warner Bros. Pictures / Regency Enterprises/Alcor Films/Ixtlan	Michael Tolkin (director/screenplay); Peter Weller, Judy Davis, Patrick Bauchau, Rachel Rosenthal, Adam West, Corbin Bernsen, Patricia Heaton, Samuel L. Jackson, Paula Marshall, Bruce Ramsay, Susan Traylor, John Diehl, Sandra Seacat, Audra Lindley, Jonathan Hadary, Kimberley Kates, Maria Ellingsen, Rebecca Staab, Jeff Weston, Bob Flanagan, Nicole Nagel, Jack Blessing, Leigh French, Gigi Vorgan, Tanya Pohlkotte, Maureen Mueller, Lily Mariye, Kelly Miller, Dana Hollowell, Mary Kane, Patrick Dollaghen, Victoria Baker, Dana Kaminski, Thomas Brunelle, June Christopher, Ken Danziger, Christie Mellor, Arnold F. Turner	
S E P T E M B E R	16	Princess Caraboo	TriStar Pictures / Beacon Pictures	Michael Austin (director/screenplay); John Wells (screenplay); Phoebe Cates, Jim Broadbent, Wendy Hughes, Kevin Kline, John Lithgow, Stephen Rea, Peter Eyre, Jacqueline Pearce, John Wells, John Lynch, John Sessions, Arkie Whiteley, Jerry Hall, Anna Chancellor	
S E P T E M B E R	16	Timecop	Universal Pictures / Largo Entertainment	Peter Hyams (director); Mark Verheiden (screenplay); Jean-Claude Van Damme, Ron Silver, Mia Sara, Bruce McGill, Gloria Reuben, Scott Bellis, Jason Schombing, Scott Lawrence, Kenneth Welsh, Brad Loree, Kevin McNulty, Gabrielle Rose, Callum Keith Rennie, Steven Lambert, Richard Faraci	
S E P T E M B E R	17	The Burning Season	HBO Pictures / Warner Bros. Television Distribution	John Frankenheimer (director); William Mastrosimone, Michael Tolkin, Ron Hutchinson (screenplay); Raúl Juliá, Carmen Argenziano, Sônia Braga, Kamala Lopez, Luis Guzmán, Nigel Havers, Tomas Milian, Esai Morales, Edward James Olmos, Tony Plana, Marco Rodríguez, Carlos Carrasco, Jonathan Carrasco, Jeffrey Licon, Jose Perez, Tony Perez, Briana Romero, Jorge Viteri, Valentin Santana, Alberto Isaac, Loló Navarro, Gerardo Albarrán, Carlos Romero, Enrique Novi, Jorge Zepeda, Roger Cudney, Joaquín Garrido	
S E P T E M B E R	23	It Runs in the Family	Metro-Goldwyn-Mayer	Bob Clark (director/screenplay); Jean Shepherd, Leigh Brown (screenplay); Charles Grodin, Mary Steenburgen, Kieran Culkin, Christian Culkin, Whit Hertford, Chris Owen, Geoffrey Wigdor, David Zahorsky, Tedde Moore, T.J. McInturff, Glenn Shadix	
S E P T E M B E R	23	The Shawshank Redemption	Columbia Pictures / Castle Rock Entertainment	Frank Darabont (director/screenplay); Tim Robbins, Morgan Freeman, Bob Gunton, William Sadler, Clancy Brown, Gil Bellows, James Whitmore, Jude Ciccolella, Mark Rolston, Jeffrey DeMunn, Alfonso Freeman, Ned Bellamy, Don McManus, Dion Anderson, Renee Blaine, Scott Mann, Frank Medrano, Bill Bolender, James Kisicki, Claire Slemmer	
S E P T E M B E R	23	Sleep with Me	United Artists / August Entertainment / Castleberg Production / Paribas Film Corporation	Rory Kelly (director/screenplay); Duane Dell'Amico, Roger Hedden, Neal Jimenez, Joe Keenan, Michael Steinberg (screenplay); Craig Sheffer, Eric Stoltz, Meg Tilly, Dean Cameron, Todd Field, Thomas Gibson, Parker Posey, Adrienne Shelly, Susan Traylor, Tegan West, June Lockhart, Lewis Arquette, Joey Lauren Adams, Vanessa Angel, Quentin Tarantino, Alexandra Hedison, Amaryllis Borrego, Alida P. Field	
S E P T E M B E R	23	Terminal Velocity	Hollywood Pictures / Interscope Communications	Deran Sarafian (director); David Twohy (screenplay); Charlie Sheen, Nastassja Kinski, James Gandolfini, Christopher McDonald, Gary Bullock, Hans Howes, Melvin Van Peebles, Margaret Colin, Cathryn de Prume, Suli McCullough, Rance Howard, Sofia Shinas	
S E P T E M B E R	28	Jason's Lyric	Gramercy Pictures / Metro-Goldwyn-Mayer	Doug McHenry (director); Bobby Smith Jr (screenplay); Allen Payne, Jada Pinkett, Bokeem Woodbine, Anthony 'Treach' Criss, Eddie Griffin, Suzzanne Douglas, Lisa Nicole Carson, Lahmard Tate, Forest Whitaker, Wayne Dehart	
S E P T E M B E R	30	Ed Wood	Touchstone Pictures	Tim Burton (director); Scott Alexander, Larry Karaszewski (screenplay); Johnny Depp, Martin Landau, Sarah Jessica Parker, Patricia Arquette, Bill Murray, Lisa Marie, Jeffrey Jones, Max Casella, George "The Animal" Steele, Juliet Landau, Ned Bellamy, Mike Starr, Stanley DeSantis, Rance Howard, Vincent D'Onofrio, Maurice LaMarche, G.D. Spradlin, Korla Pandit, Gregory Walcott, Conrad Brooks, Brent Hinkley, Clive Rosengren, Norman Alden, Leonard Termo, Danny Dayton, Biff Yeager, Joseph R. Gannascoli, Carmen Filpi, Melora Walters, Don Amendolia, Bobby Slayton, Catherine Butterfield, Ray Baker, Louis Lombardi, Patrick Cranshaw	
S E P T E M B E R	30	The River Wild	Universal Pictures	Curtis Hanson (director); Denis O'Neill (screenplay); Meryl Streep, Kevin Bacon, David Strathairn, Benjamin Bratt, John C. Reilly, Joseph Mazzello	
S E P T E M B E R	30	The Scout	20th Century Fox	Michael Ritchie (director); Roger Angell, Andrew Bergman, Albert Brooks, Monica Johnson (screenplay); Albert Brooks, Brendan Fraser, Dianne Wiest, Anne Twomey, Lane Smith, Michael Rapaport, Barry Shabaka Henley, John Capodice, Art Garfield, Marcia Rodd, Steve Eastin, Lee Weaver, J.K. Simmons, Bob Costas, Tim McCarver, Tony Bennett, John Sterling, Keith Hernández, Bret Saberhagen, George Steinbrenner, Brian Cashman, Ozzie Smith, Bob Tewksbury, Bobby Murcer, John Roland, Steve Garvey, Tom Kelly, Ken Brett, Reggie Smith, Roy Firestone, Bob Sheppard, Rosanna Scotto	
S E P T E M B E R	30	Second Best	Warner Bros. Pictures / Regency Enterprises / Alcor Films	Chris Menges (director); David Cook (screenplay); William Hurt, John Hurt, Chris Cleary Miles, Jane Horrocks, Alan Cumming, Keith Allen, Jake Owen	

== October–December ==
Opening		Title	Production company	Cast and crew	Ref.
O C T O B E R	7	Only You	TriStar Pictures	Norman Jewison (director); Diane Drake (screenplay); Marisa Tomei, Robert Downey Jr., Bonnie Hunt, Joaquim de Almeida, Fisher Stevens, Billy Zane, Siobhan Fallon, John Benjamin Hickey, Adam LeFevre, Barbara Cupisti, Phyllis Newman	
O C T O B E R	7	The Specialist	Warner Bros. Pictures	Luis Llosa (director); Alexandra Seros (screenplay); Sylvester Stallone, Sharon Stone, James Woods, Eric Roberts, Rod Steiger, Mario Ernesto Sanchez, Chase Randolph, Jeana Bell, Tony Munafo, Emilio Estefan, Jr.	
O C T O B E R	7	A Troll in Central Park	Warner Bros. Pictures / Don Bluth Entertainment	Don Bluth, Gary Goldman (directors); Stu Krieger (screenplay); Dom DeLuise, Cloris Leachman, Charles Nelson Reilly, Jonathan Pryce, Hayley Mills, Phillip Glasser, Tawny Sunshine Glover, Neil Ross, Will Ryan, Pat Musick	
O C T O B E R	12	The Browning Version	Paramount Pictures	Mike Figgis (director); Ronald Harwood (screenplay); Albert Finney, Greta Scacchi, Matthew Modine, Julian Sands, Michael Gambon, Ben Silverstone, Jim Sturgess, Joseph Beattie, Maryam d'Abo, Heathcote Williams	
O C T O B E R	14	Exit to Eden	Savoy Pictures	Garry Marshall (director); Deborah Amelon, Bob Brunner (screenplay); Dana Delany, Paul Mercurio, Rosie O'Donnell, Dan Aykroyd, Hector Elizondo, Stuart Wilson, Iman, Sean O'Bryan, Stephanie Niznik, Laura Harring, Deborah Pratt, James Patrick Stuart, Rosemary Forsyth, John Schneider, Donna Dixon, Mel Novak	
O C T O B E R	14	Hoop Dreams	Fine Line Features	Steve James (director/screenplay); Frederick Marx (screenplay); William Gates, Arthur Agee	
O C T O B E R	14	Imaginary Crimes	Warner Bros. Pictures	Anthony Drazan (director); Kristine Johnson, Davia Nelson (screenplay); Harvey Keitel, Fairuza Balk, Kelly Lynch, Vincent D'Onofrio, Diane Baker, Chris Penn, Seymour Cassel, Elisabeth Moss, Annette O'Toole, Amber Benson, Richard Venture, William G. Schilling, Zoe McLellan, Greg Germann, Roger Wilson, Robert Blanche	
O C T O B E R	14	I Like It Like That	Columbia Pictures	Darnell Martin (director/screenplay); Lauren Velez, Jon Seda, Griffin Dunne, Jesse Borrego, Rita Moreno, Lisa Vidal, Tomas Melly, Desiree Casado, Isaiah Garcia, Vincent Laresca, Elvis Nolasco, Jerry Rivera	
O C T O B E R	14	Little Giants	Warner Bros. Pictures / Amblin Entertainment	Duwayne Dunham (director); James Ferguson, Robert Shallcross (screenplay); Rick Moranis, Ed O'Neill, Shawna Waldron, Devon Sawa, Susanna Thompson, Brian Haley, Mary Ellen Trainor, Courtney Peldon, Alexa Vega, Todd Bosley, Mark Holton, Jon Paul Steuer, Marcus Toji, Pat Crawford Brown, Harry Shearer, Janna Michaels, Rickey D'Shon Collins, Dabbs Greer, Willie C. Carpenter, Myron Healey, Rance Howard, John Madden, Steve Emtman, Bruce Smith, Emmitt Smith, Tim Brown, Frank Welker, Sam Horrigan, Joe Bays, Frank Carl Fisher Jr., Danny Pritchett, Matthew McCurley, Joey Simmrin, Troy Simmons, Mike Zwiener, Justin Jon Ross, Travis Robertson, Austin Kottke	
O C T O B E R	14	Pulp Fiction	Miramax Films	Quentin Tarantino (director/screenplay); John Travolta, Samuel L. Jackson, Uma Thurman, Harvey Keitel, Tim Roth, Amanda Plummer, Maria de Medeiros, Ving Rhames, Eric Stoltz, Rosanna Arquette, Christopher Walken, Bruce Willis, Phil LaMarr, Frank Whaley, Burr Steers, Paul Calderon, Bronagh Gallagher, Steve Buscemi, Angela Jones, Kathy Griffin, Linda Kaye, Duane Whitaker, Peter Greene, Stephen Gibbert, Alexis Arquette, Quentin Tarantino, Julia Sweeney, Lawrence Bender	
O C T O B E R	14	Wes Craven's New Nightmare	New Line Cinema	Wes Craven (director/screenplay); Robert Englund, Heather Langenkamp, Miko Hughes, John Saxon, Tracy Middendorf, David Newsom, Fran Bennett, Wes Craven, Robert Shaye, Marianne Maddalena, Sam Rubin, Matt Winston, W. Earl Brown, Lin Shaye, Nick Corri, Tuesday Knight, Gretchen Oehler, Cully Fredricksen, Bodhi Elfman, Jessica Craven, Amanda Wyss, Sara Risher, Claudia Haro, Rob LaBelle	
O C T O B E R	14	Bullets over Broadway	Miramax Films	Woody Allen (director/screenplay); Douglas McGrath (screenplay); John Cusack, Dianne Wiest, Jennifer Tilly, Chazz Palminteri, Mary-Louise Parker, Jack Warden, Joe Viterelli, Rob Reiner, Tracey Ullman, Jim Broadbent, Harvey Fierstein, Stacey Nelkin, Malgorzata Zajaczkowska, Charles Cragin, Edie Falco, Debi Mazar, Brian McConnachie, Tony Sirico, Victor Colicchio, John Ventimiglia, Meghan Strange, Paul Herman, Shannah Laumeister, Dayle Haddon, Tony Darrow, Benay Venuta, Peter McRobbie	
O C T O B E R	19	Clerks	Miramax Films / View Askew Productions	Kevin Smith (director/screenplay); Brian O'Halloran, Jeff Anderson, Marilyn Ghigliotti, Lisa Spoonauer, Jason Mewes, Kevin Smith, Scott Mosier, Walt Flanagan, Ernest O'Donnell, David Klein, Vincent Pereira, Scott Schiaffo, Al Berkowitz, Ed Hapstak, Pattijean Csik, Ken Clark, Kimberly Loughran, Gary Stern, Lee Bendick, John Henry Westhead, Betsy Broussard, Grace Smith, Frances Cresci	
O C T O B E R	21	Love Affair	Warner Bros. Pictures	Glenn Gordon Caron (director); Robert Towne, Warren Beatty (screenplay); Warren Beatty, Annette Bening, Katharine Hepburn, Garry Shandling, Chloe Webb, Pierce Brosnan, Kate Capshaw, Paul Mazursky, Brenda Vaccaro, Glenn Shadix, Barry Miller, Harold Ramis, Linda Wallem, Meagen Fay, Ray Girardin, John Hostetter, Elya Baskin, Savely Kramarov, Oleg Vidov, Taylor Dayne, Carey Lowell, Ed McMahon, Dan Castellaneta, Jeffrey Nordling, Rosalind Chao, Rebecca Miller, Cylk Cozart, Frank Campanella, Wendie Jo Sperber, Helena Carroll, Manu Tupou, Lisa Edelstein, Stefan Lysenko, Herman Sinitzyn, Rosalind Allen, Mary Hart, John Tesh, Steve Kmetko, Terry Murphy, Barry Nolan, Ray Charles	
O C T O B E R	21	The Puppet Masters	Hollywood Pictures	Stuart Orme (director); Ted Elliott, Terry Rossio, David S. Goyer (screenplay); Donald Sutherland, Eric Thal, Julie Warner, Keith David, Will Patton, Richard Belzer, Tom Mason, Yaphet Kotto, Sam Anderson, J. Patrick McCormack, Marshall Bell, Nicholas Cascone, Bruce Jarchow, Benjamin Mouton, David Pasquesi, Andrew Robinson, Benj Thall, William Wellman, Jr., Dale Dye, John C. Cooke, Michael Shamus Wiles	
O C T O B E R	21	Radioland Murders	Universal Pictures	Mel Smith (director); Willard Huyck, Gloria Katz, Jeff Reno, Ron Osborn (screenplay); Brian Benben, Mary Stuart Masterson, Scott Michael Campbell, Michael Lerner, Ned Beatty, Brion James, Stephen Tobolowsky, Michael McKean, Corbin Bernsen, Bobcat Goldthwait, Anita Morris, Jeffrey Tambor, Larry Miller, Christopher Lloyd, Harvey Korman, Dylan Baker, Jack Sheldon, Jim David, George Burns, Joey Lawrence, Billy Barty, Peter MacNicol, Robert Klein, Ellen Albertini Dow, Candy Clark, Bo Hopkins, Rosemary Clooney, Tracy Byrd, Robert Walden, Jennifer Dundas, Nina Repeta, J. Don Ferguson, Mousie Garner, Gary Kroeger, Tammy Lauren, Marguerite MacIntyre, Gary Anthony Williams	
O C T O B E R	26	The Last Seduction	October Films	John Dahl (director); Steve Barancik (screenplay); Linda Fiorentino, Peter Berg, Bill Pullman, Bill Nunn, J.T. Walsh, Dean Norris, Serena	
O C T O B E R	28	Drop Squad	Gramercy Pictures	David C. Johnson (director/screenplay); Butch Robinson (screenplay); Eriq La Salle, Vondie Curtis-Hall, Ving Rhames, Kasi Lemmons, Leonard L. Thomas, Vanessa Williams, Michael Ralph, Kimberly Hawthorne, Afemo Omilami, Paula Kelly, Charles Brown. Tico Wells, Ray Aranha, Fran Carter, Charles Weldon, Paul Benjamin, Charnele Brown, Ellis Williams, William Allen Young, Spike Lee, Nicole Powell, Eric Payne, Crystal R. Fox, Billy "Sly" Williams, Iris Little Thomas, Roderick Garr, Donna Briscoe, Mark David Kennerly, Dwania Kyles, Michael H. Moss	
O C T O B E R	28	The Road to Wellville	Columbia Pictures / Beacon Pictures	Alan Parker (director/screenplay); Anthony Hopkins, Bridget Fonda, Matthew Broderick, John Cusack, Dana Carvey, Michael Lerner, Colm Meaney, John Neville, Lara Flynn Boyle, Traci Lind, Camryn Manheim, Roy Brocksmith, Norbert Weisser, Jacob Reynolds, Marshall Efron, Carole Shelley, Marianne Muellerleile	
O C T O B E R	28	Silent Fall	Warner Bros. Pictures / Morgan Creek Productions	Bruce Beresford (director); Akiva Goldsman (screenplay); Richard Dreyfuss, Linda Hamilton, John Lithgow, J.T. Walsh, Liv Tyler, Ben Faulkner, Zahn McClarnon, Catherine Shaffner, Jane Beard	
O C T O B E R	28	Squanto: A Warrior's Tale	Walt Disney Pictures	Xavier Koller, Christopher Stoia (directors); Darlene Craviotto (screenplay); Adam Beach, Sheldon Peters Wolfchild, Irene Bedard, Eric Schweig, Leroy Peltier, Michael Gambon, Nathaniel Parker, Alex Norton, Mark Margolis, Julian Richings, Mandy Patinkin, Donal Donnelly, Stuart Pankin, Paul Klementowicz, Bray Poor, Tim Hopper, John Saint Ryan, John Dunn-Hill, Selim Running Bear Sandoval	
O C T O B E R	28	Stargate	Metro-Goldwyn-Mayer / Carolco Pictures	Roland Emmerich (director/screenplay); Dean Devlin (screenplay); Kurt Russell, James Spader, Jaye Davidson, Viveca Lindfors, Alexis Cruz, Mili Avital, Erick Avari, Leon Rippy, John Diehl, French Stewart, Richard Kind, Rae Allen, Derek Webster, Carlos Lauchu, Djimon Hounsou, Christopher John Fields, Jack Moore, Steve Giannelli, Kelly Vint Castro	
N O V E M B E R	4	Double Dragon	Gramercy Pictures / Imperial Entertainment	James Yukich (director); Michael Davis, Peter Gould (screenplay); Mark Dacascos, Scott Wolf, Robert Patrick, Alyssa Milano, Julia Nickson, Kristina Wagner, John Mallory Asher, Leon Russom, Nils Allen Stewart, Henry Kingi, George Hamilton, Vanna White, Andy Dick, Cory Milano	
N O V E M B E R	4	Mary Shelley's Frankenstein	TriStar Pictures / American Zoetrope	Kenneth Branagh (director); Steph Lady, Frank Darabont (screenplay); Robert De Niro, Kenneth Branagh, Tom Hulce, Helena Bonham Carter, Ian Holm, John Cleese, Aidan Quinn, Richard Briers, Robert Hardy, Trevyn McDowell, Celia Imrie, Cherie Lunghi, Ryan Smith, Hugh Bonneville, Jenny Galloway, Patrick Doyle, Alex Lowe, Stuart Hazeldine	
N O V E M B E R	4	Oleanna	The Samuel Goldwyn Company	David Mamet (director/screenplay); William H. Macy, Debra Eisenstadt	
N O V E M B E R	4	Pontiac Moon	Paramount Pictures	Peter Medak (director); Finn Taylor, Jeffrey D. Brown (screenplay); Ted Danson, Mary Steenburgen, Eric Schweig, Cathy Moriarty, Max Gail, Lisa Jane Persky, John Schuck, Don Swayze, Basil Hoffman, Leslie Ryan, Ryan Todd	
N O V E M B E R	4	The War	Universal Pictures	Jon Avnet (director); Kathy McWorter (screenplay); Elijah Wood, Kevin Costner, Mare Winningham, Lexi Randall, Lucas Black, Christine Baranski, LaToya Chisholm, Christopher Fennell, Donald Sellers, Leon Sills, Will West, Bruce A. Young, Brennan Gallagher, Jennifer Tyler, Charlette Julius	
N O V E M B E R	11	Interview with the Vampire: The Vampire Chronicles	Geffen Pictures	Neil Jordan (director); Anne Rice (screenplay); Tom Cruise, Brad Pitt, Stephen Rea, Antonio Banderas, Christian Slater, Kirsten Dunst, Domiziana Giordano, Thandie Newton, George Kelly, Marcel Iures, Sara Stockbridge, Indra Ove	
N O V E M B E R	11	The Santa Clause	Walt Disney Pictures / Hollywood Pictures	John Pasquin (director); Leo Benvenuti, Steve Rudnick (screenplay); Tim Allen, Eric Lloyd, Wendy Crewson, Judge Reinhold, David Krumholtz, Peter Boyle, Larry Brandenburg, Jayne Eastwood, Kenny Vadas, Paige Tamada, Chris Benson, Mary Gross, Joyce Guy, Judith Scott, Steve Vinovich, Tabitha Lupien, Lachlan Murdoch, John Pasquin, Frank Welker, Kerrigan Mahan, Bob Dermer, Nina Keogh	
N O V E M B E R	16	Heavenly Creatures	Miramax Films	Peter Jackson (director/screenplay); Fran Walsh (screenplay); Melanie Lynskey, Kate Winslet, Sarah Peirse, Diana Kent, Clive Merrison, Simon O'Connor, Jed Brophy, Peter Elliott, Gilbert Goldie, Elizabeth Moody	
N O V E M B E R	18	Miracle on 34th Street	20th Century Fox / Hughes Entertainment	Les Mayfield (director); George Seaton, John Hughes (screenplay); Richard Attenborough, Elizabeth Perkins, Mara Wilson, Dylan McDermott, J.T. Walsh, Simon Jones, James Remar, Jane Leeves, William Windom, Robert Prosky, Allison Janney, Jack McGee, Kathrine Narducci, Mary McCormack, Byrne Piven, Peter Gerety, Jennifer Morrison, Horatio Sanz, Joss Ackland, Rosanna Scotto, Michele Marsh, Lester Holt	
N O V E M B E R	18	Star Trek Generations	Paramount Pictures	David Carson (director); Ronald D. Moore, Brannon Braga (screenplay); Patrick Stewart, William Shatner, Jonathan Frakes, Brent Spiner, LeVar Burton, Michael Dorn, Gates McFadden, Marina Sirtis, Malcolm McDowell, James Doohan, Walter Koenig, Alan Ruck, Jacqueline Kim, Jenette Goldstein, Thomas Kopache, Glenn Morshower, Tim Russ, Tommy Hinkley, Patti Yasutake, Majel Barrett, Barbara March, Gwynyth Walsh, Rif Hutton, Brian Thompson, Thomas Alexander Dekker, Olivia Hack, Whoopi Goldberg	
N O V E M B E R	18	The Swan Princess	New Line Cinema / Nest Family Entertainment	Richard Rich (director); Brian Nissen (screenplay); Michelle Nicastro, Howard McGillin, Jack Palance, John Cleese, Steven Wright, Steve Vinovich, Sandy Duncan, James Arrington, Dakin Matthews, Mark Harelik, Joel McKinnon Miller, Bess Hopper, Brian Nissen, Liz Callaway, Lex de Azevedo, Davis Gaines, David Zippel, Jonathan Hadary, Adam Wylie	
N O V E M B E R	23	Junior	Universal Pictures / Northern Lights Entertainment	Ivan Reitman (director); Kevin Wade, Chris Conrad (screenplay); Arnold Schwarzenegger, Danny DeVito, Emma Thompson, Frank Langella, Pamela Reed, Aida Turturro, James Eckhouse, Megan Cavanagh, Kathleen Chalfant, Judy Collins, Christopher Meloni, Stefan Gierasch, Alexander Enberg, Ira Newborn, John Pinette, Fred Stoller, Anna Gunn, Maggie Han, Lawrence Tierney, Matt Mulhern, Tom Dugan, Phyllida Law, Tracey Walter	
N O V E M B E R	23	Love and a .45	Trimark Pictures	C.M. Talkington (director/screenplay); Gil Bellows, Renée Zellweger, Rory Cochrane, Jeffrey Combs, Jace Alexander, Michael Bowen, Jack Nance, Ann Wedgeworth, Peter Fonda, Wiley Wiggins, Charlotte Ross, Brad Leland, Darin Scott	
N O V E M B E R	23	A Low Down Dirty Shame	Hollywood Pictures / Caravan Pictures	Keenen Ivory Wayans (director/screenplay); Keenen Ivory Wayans, Jada Pinkett, Andrew Divoff, Charles S. Dutton, Salli Richardson, Chris Spencer, Corwin Hawkins, Don Diamont, Gary Cervantes, Gregory Sierra, Andrew Shaifer, Kim Wayans, Rene Hicks	
N O V E M B E R	23	Mrs. Parker and the Vicious Circle	Fine Line Features	Alan Rudolph (director/screenplay); Randy Sue Coburn (screenplay); Jennifer Jason Leigh, Campbell Scott, Matthew Broderick, Peter Gallagher, Jennifer Beals, Andrew McCarthy, Wallace Shawn, Martha Plimpton, Sam Robards, Lili Taylor, James LeGros, Gwyneth Paltrow, Nick Cassavetes, David Thornton, Heather Graham, Tom McGowan, Chip Zien, Gary Basaraba, Jane Adams, Stephen Baldwin, Matt Malloy, Rebecca Miller, Jake Johannsen, Amelia Campbell, David Gow, Leni Parker, Stanley Tucci, Keith Carradine, Jon Favreau, Gabriel Gascon, Harry Standjofski, Bruce Dinsmore, Arthur Holden, Jack Langedijk, Eleanor Noble, Peter Benchley, Malcolm Gets, Maurice Podbrey, Walter Massey, Gisèle Rousseau, Ellen David, Domini Blythe, Gregory Hlady, Mark Camacho, Cyndi Lauper	
N O V E M B E R	23	The Pagemaster	20th Century Fox	Joe Johnston, Pixote Hunt (directors); David Casci, David Kirschner, Ernie Contreras (screenplay); Macaulay Culkin, Christopher Lloyd, Ed Begley Jr., Mel Harris, Patrick Stewart, Whoopi Goldberg, Frank Welker, Leonard Nimoy, George Hearn, Phil Hartman, Jim Cummings, Ed Gilbert, B.J. Ward, Richard Erdman, Fernando Escandon, Dorian Harewood, Robert Picardo	
N O V E M B E R	26	Fatherland	HBO Pictures	Christopher Menaul (director); Stanley Weiser, Ron Hutchinson (screenplay); Rutger Hauer, Miranda Richardson, Peter Vaughan, Michael Kitchen, Jean Marsh, John Woodvine, John Shrapnel, Clive Russell, Clare Higgins, Pavel Anděl, Petronella O. Barker, Sarah Berger, Jan Bidlas, Stuart Bunce, Charles De'Ath, Neil Dudgeon, Rudolph Fleischer, Garrick Hagon, David Hatton, Rupert Penry-Jones, Jan Kohout, Rory Jennings, Bob Mason, David McAlister, Petr Meissel, Patrick Opaterny, David Ryall, Zdena Seifertova, Michael J. Shannon, Milan Simácek, Marek Vasut, Jan Vlasák, Rupert Degas, Ivo Novak	
D E C E M B E R	2	Cobb	Warner Bros. Pictures / Regency Enterprises	Ron Shelton (director/screenplay); Tommy Lee Jones, Robert Wuhl, Lolita Davidovich, Ned Bellamy, Lou Myers, J. Kenneth Campbell, Rhoda Griffis, Roger Clemens, George P. Wilbur, Tommy Bush, Stacy Keach, Sr., Crash Davis, Bradley Whitford, Jimmy Buffett, Don Hood, Scott Burkholder, William Utay, Stephen Mendillo, Rath Shelton, Jim Shelton, Reid Cruickshanks, Eloy Casados, Paula Rudy, Brian Patrick Mulligan	
D E C E M B E R	2	Tom & Viv	Miramax Films	Brian Gilbert (director); Michael Hastings, Adrian Hodges (screenplay); Willem Dafoe, Miranda Richardson, Rosemary Harris, Tim Dutton, Nickolas Grace, Geoffrey Bayldon, Clare Holman, Philip Locke, Joanna McCallum, Joseph O'Conor, John Savident, Michael Attwell, Roberta Taylor, Anna Chancellor, John Clegg, James Greene, Simon McBurney, Linda Spurrier, Christopher Baines, Sharon Bower	
D E C E M B E R	2	Trapped in Paradise	20th Century Fox	George Gallo (director/screenplay); Nicolas Cage, Jon Lovitz, Dana Carvey, Madchen Amick, Florence Stanley, Donald Moffat, Angela Paton, Vic Manni, Frank Pesce, John Ashton, John Bergantine, Sean McCann, Richard Jenkins, Sean O'Bryan, Gerard Parkes, Richard B. Shull	
D E C E M B E R	9	Disclosure	Warner Bros. Pictures	Barry Levinson (director); Paul Attanasio (screenplay); Michael Douglas, Demi Moore, Donald Sutherland, Caroline Goodall, Dennis Miller, Roma Maffia, Dylan Baker, Rosemary Forsyth, Suzie Plakson, Nicholas Sadler, Jacqueline Kim, Kate Williamson, Donal Logue, Farrah Forke, Allan Rich, David Drew Gallagher	
D E C E M B E R	9	Drop Zone	Paramount Pictures	John Badham (director); Peter Barsocchini, John Bishop (screenplay); Wesley Snipes, Gary Busey, Yancy Butler, Michael Jeter, Malcolm-Jamal Warner, Kyle Secor, Rex Linn, Grace Zabriskie, Corin Nemec, Claire Stansfield, Mickey Jones, Robert LaSardo, Andy Romano, Luca Bercovici	
D E C E M B E R	10	Witch Hunt	HBO Pictures / Pacific Western	Paul Schrader (director); Joseph Dougherty (screenplay); Dennis Hopper, Penelope Ann Miller, Eric Bogosian, Sheryl Lee Ralph, Julian Sands, Valerie Mahaffey, John Epperson, Debi Mazar, Alan Rosenberg, Christopher John Fields, John Durbin, Gregory Bell, Terry Camilleri, Christopher Draga, Stanley DeSantis, Clifton Collins Jr., Robert Goolrick, James Harper, Nancy Linehan Charles, Julianne Morris, Alan Poul, Phil Reeves, Steve Susskind, Michael 'Bear' Taliferro, Joseph Pilato, Ronald Reagan	
D E C E M B E R	16	Dumb and Dumber	New Line Cinema / Motion Picture Corporation of America	Peter Farrelly, Bobby Farrelly (directors/screenplay); Bennett Yellin (screenplay); Jim Carrey, Jeff Daniels, Lauren Holly, Karen Duffy, Mike Starr, Charles Rocket, Teri Garr, Victoria Rowell, Cam Neely, Joe Baker, Harland Williams, Brad Lockerman, Lin Shaye, Hank Brandt, Felton Perry, Brady Bluhm, Connie Sawyer	
D E C E M B E R	16	Immortal Beloved	Columbia Pictures / Icon Productions	Bernard Rose (director/screenplay); Gary Oldman, Jeroen Krabbé, Isabella Rossellini, Johanna ter Steege, Christopher Fulford, Michael Culkin, Marco Hofschneider, Miriam Margolyes, Barry Humphries, Valeria Golino, Alexandra Pigg	
D E C E M B E R	16	Speechless	Metro-Goldwyn-Mayer	Ron Underwood (director); Robert King (screenplay); Michael Keaton, Geena Davis, Bonnie Bedelia, Ernie Hudson, Christopher Reeve, Charles Martin Smith, Gailard Sartain, Ray Baker, Mitchell Ryan, Willie Garson, Harry Shearer, Steven Wright, Jodi Carlisle, Paul Lazar, Richard Poe, Peter Mackenzie, Richard McGonagle, Tony Genaro, Mary Pat Gleason	
D E C E M B E R	21	Little Women	Columbia Pictures	Gillian Armstrong (director); Robin Swicord (screenplay); Winona Ryder, Susan Sarandon, Trini Alvarado, Claire Danes, Kirsten Dunst, Christian Bale, Gabriel Byrne, Samantha Mathis, Eric Stoltz, Matthew Walker, John Neville, Mary Wickes, Florence Paterson, Janne Mortil	
D E C E M B E R	21	Mixed Nuts	TriStar Pictures	Nora Ephron (director/screenplay); Delia Ephron (screenplay); Steve Martin, Madeline Kahn, Robert Klein, Anthony LaPaglia, Juliette Lewis, Rob Reiner, Adam Sandler, Liev Schreiber, Garry Shandling, Rita Wilson, Parker Posey, Jon Stewart, Joely Fisher, Christine Cavanaugh, Henry Brown, Steven Wright, Brian Markinson, Caroline Aaron, Mary Gross, Victor Garber, Haley Joel Osment, Michael Badalucco, Sidney Armus, Kurt Lockwood, Diane Sokolow	
D E C E M B E R	21	Richie Rich	Warner Bros. Pictures / Silver Pictures	Donald Petrie (director); Neil Tolkin, Tom S. Parker (screenplay); Macaulay Culkin, John Larroquette, Edward Herrmann, Christine Ebersole, Jonathan Hyde, Mike McShane, Chelcie Ross, Stephi Lineburg, Mariangela Pino, Joel Robinson, Jonathan Hilario, Michael Maccarone, Justin Zaremby, Rory Culkin, Ben Stein, Claudia Schiffer, Reggie Jackson	
D E C E M B E R	23	Death and the Maiden	Fine Line Features	Roman Polanski (director); Ariel Dorfman, Rafael Yglesias (screenplay); Sigourney Weaver, Ben Kingsley, Stuart Wilson	
D E C E M B E R	23	Legends of the Fall	TriStar Pictures	Edward Zwick (director); Susan Shilliday, William D. Wittliff (screenplay); Brad Pitt, Anthony Hopkins, Aidan Quinn, Julia Ormond, Henry Thomas, Karina Lombard, Gordon Tootoosis, Christina Pickles, Paul Desmond, Tantoo Cardinal, Robert Wisden, John Novak, Kenneth Welsh, Bart the Bear, Keegan MacIntosh, Eric Johnson, Sekwan Auger	
D E C E M B E R	23	Nell	20th Century Fox	Michael Apted (director); William Nicholson, Mark Handley (screenplay); Jodie Foster, Liam Neeson, Natasha Richardson, Richard Libertini, Nick Searcy, Jeremy Davies, Robin Mullins, O'Neal Compton, Sean Bridgers, Marlon Jackson	
D E C E M B E R	23	Nobody's Fool	Paramount Pictures	Robert Benton (director/screenplay); Paul Newman, Jessica Tandy, Melanie Griffith, Dylan Walsh, Bruce Willis, Philip Seymour Hoffman, Margo Martindale, Josef Sommer, Gene Saks, Pruitt Taylor Vince, Philip Bosco, Catherine Dent	
D E C E M B E R	23	Ready to Wear (Prêt-à-Porter)	Miramax Films	Robert Altman (director/screenplay); Barbara Shulgasser (screenplay); Marcello Mastroianni, Sophia Loren, Anouk Aimée, Rupert Everett, Julia Roberts, Tim Robbins, Kim Basinger, Stephen Rea, Forest Whitaker, Richard E. Grant, Lauren Bacall, Lyle Lovett, Lili Taylor, Sally Kellerman, Tracey Ullman, Linda Hunt, Teri Garr, Danny Aiello, Ute Lemper, Rossy de Palma, Chiara Mastroianni, Jean-Pierre Cassel, Georgianna Robertson, Jean Rochefort, Michel Blanc, Francois Cluzet, Kasia Figura, Sam Robards, Alexandra Vandernoot, Tom Novembre, Anne Canovas, Laura Benson, Maurice Lamy, Harry Belafonte, Paolo Bulgari, Cher, Helena Christensen, Elsa Klensch, Claude Montana, Thierry Mugler, Tatjana Patitz, Sonia Rykiel, Eve Salvail, Nicola Trussardi, Jean-Paul Gaultier, Christian Lacroix, Issey Miyake, Gianfranco Ferré, Susie Bick, Björk, Carla Bruni, Naomi Campbell, David Copperfield, Linda Evangelista, Yvette Horner, Adriana Karembeu, Diane Pernet, Claudia Schiffer, Ann Turkel, Christy Turlington	
D E C E M B E R	23	Street Fighter	Universal Pictures	Steven E. de Souza (director/screenplay); Jean-Claude Van Damme, Raul Julia, Ming-Na Wen, Damian Chapa, Kylie Minogue, Wes Studi, Simon Callow, Byron Mann, Roshan Seth, Andrew Bryniarski, Grand L. Bush, Robert Mammone, Miguel A. Nunez Jr., Gregg Rainwater, Kenya Sawada, Jay Tavare, Peter "Navy" Tuiasosopo, Joe Bugner	
D E C E M B E R	25	I.Q.	Paramount Pictures	Fred Schepisi (director); Andy Breckman (screenplay); Tim Robbins, Meg Ryan, Walter Matthau, Lou Jacobi, Gene Saks, Joseph Maher, Stephen Fry, Daniel von Bargen, Tony Shalhoub, Frank Whaley, Charles Durning, Keene Curtis, Alice Playten, Danny Zorn, Helen Hanft, Roger Berlind, Lewis J. Stadlen, Jack Koenig, Scotty Bloch, Alice Drummond, Greg Germann	
D E C E M B E R	25	The Jungle Book	Walt Disney Pictures	Stephen Sommers (director/screenplay); Ronald Yanover, Mark Geldman (screenplay); Jason Scott Lee, Cary Elwes, Lena Headey, Sam Neill, John Cleese, Jason Flemyng, Ron Donachie, Stefan Kalipha, Anirudh Agarwal, Faran Tahir	
D E C E M B E R	28	The Madness of King George	The Samuel Goldwyn Company	Nicholas Hytner (director); Alan Bennett (screenplay); Nigel Hawthorne, Helen Mirren, Ian Holm, Amanda Donohoe, Rupert Graves, Rupert Everett. Geoffrey Palmer, Jim Carter, Julian Rhind-Tutt, Julian Wadham, Anthony Calf, Adrian Scarborough, John Wood, Jeremy Child, Struan Rodger, Janine Duvitski, Caroline Harker, Roger Hammond, Cyril Shaps, Selina Cadell, Alan Bennett, Nicholas Selby	

== See also ==
- List of 1994 box office number-one films in the United States
- 1994 in the United States
