= Gitonga =

Gitonga may be,

- Gitonga language
- Charles Gitonga
- Charles Gitonga Maina
