= Archie Lang =

Archie Lang is the name of:

- Archie Lang (footballer) (1860–1925), Scottish footballer
- Archie Lang (politician), Canadian politician
- Archie Lang (actor), American actor
