= Stephen Koepp =

American journalist

- Born: May 27, 1956 (age 69); Pewaukee, Wisconsin, U.S.
- Occupation(s): Journalist, Editor, Entrepreneur
- Spouse: Lesley Alderman
- Children: 2

Stephen Koepp (born May 27, 1956) is a journalist, editor, and entrepreneur. As co-founder and Chief Content Officer of From Day One, a conference series and media outlet focusing on corporate values, Koepp is a regular media commenter on the relationship between companies and their employees, customers, and community As a business publication, From Day One produces news and original reporting on topics of corporate social responsibility, human resources, marketing, and communications, and is accredited by SHRM and HRCI. From Day One's conferences often feature academics, journalists, and authors, in addition to business leaders.

Previously, Koepp was executive editor of both Fortune Magazine and Time Magazine and editorial director of the book publishing unit of Time Inc. At Time he developed the annual cover story on American history and also developed the magazine's 80th anniversary special, the "80 Days That Changed the World." He edited the first edition of the annual "Time 100" issue that compiles a list of the world's most influential people. Stephen is also founder and editor of The Bridge, a website covering business in Brooklyn.

Additionally, with his brother David Koepp, Stephen co-wrote The Paper, a feature film directed by Ron Howard and starring Michael Keaton, Glenn Close, Marisa Tomei, Randy Quaid and Robert Duvall. He is a graduate of the University of Wisconsin–Eau Claire.
