= The Paper (film) =

1994 American film by Ron Howard

- Theatrical release poster
- Directed by: Ron Howard
- Written by: David Koepp; Stephen Koepp
- Produced by: Brian Grazer; Frederick Zollo
- Starring: Michael Keaton; Glenn Close; Marisa Tomei; Randy Quaid; Robert Duvall
- Cinematography: John Seale
- Edited by: Daniel P. Hanley; Mike Hill
- Music by: Randy Newman
- Production company: Imagine Entertainment
- Distributed by: Universal Pictures
- Release date: March 18, 1994
- Running time: 112 minutes
- Country: United States
- Language: English
- Box office: $48.4 million

The Paper is a 1994 American comedy-drama film directed by Ron Howard and starring Michael Keaton, Glenn Close, Marisa Tomei, Randy Quaid, and Robert Duvall. It received an Academy Award nomination for Best Original Song for "Make Up Your Mind", which was written and performed by Randy Newman.

The film depicts 24 hours in a newspaper editor's hectic professional and personal life. The main story of the day is two white businessmen found murdered in a parked car in New York City. The reporters discover a police cover-up of evidence that the black teenage suspects in custody are innocent and rush to scoop the story in the midst of professional, private, and financial chaos.

The Paper was released by Universal Pictures on March 18, 1994. The film received positive reviews from critics and grossed $48.4 million.

== Plot ==
Henry Hackett is the metro editor of the tabloid newspaper The New York Sun (Note: This newspaper is fictional. The real New York Sun merged with another paper in 1950, but the film version shares the same masthead. Since the film's release, a new incarnation of the Sun appeared, also using the masthead.) who loves his job, but has grown weary of the long hours and low pay. He also worries that he could become like his editor-in-chief, Bernie White, who put his work first at the expense of his family. Bernie reveals to Henry that he has been diagnosed with prostate cancer, and tries to track down his estranged daughter in an attempt to reconcile before his time is up.

Facing dire financial straits, the paper's owner has Henry's nemesis, managing editor Alicia Clark, impose unpopular cutbacks. He is also clashing with his pregnant wife Martha, a fellow Sun journalist (currently on leave), over her fears that he won't be around to help raise their child. She urges him to become an editor at the prestigious New York Sentinel, (Note: Based on The New York Times) which would mean more money, respect and fewer hours.

That morning, a hot story develops involving the murder of two white businessmen in Williamsburg, Brooklyn. A pair of African-American teenagers are arrested for the crime, but Henry and columnist Michael McDougal become skeptical after hearing cops criticizing the arrest on the newsroom police scanner.

Henry becomes obsessed with the case, pushing his staff to dig into the story. It leads him to blow his chances at the Sentinel when he cannot resist stealing information about the case while in the Sentinel newsroom interviewing for the job. Meanwhile, a source tells Martha that the businessmen were bankers who stole money from a reputed New York mobster, further convincing Henry that the Brooklyn youths were wrongly arrested.

Henry pushes to extend the deadline to get more time to nail the story, but Alicia refuses, citing the cost of overtime pay for the press workers and delivery truck drivers. With time running out, Henry and McDougal get a police detective to confirm that the suspects are innocent, and just happened to be in the wrong place at the wrong time. Returning to the Sun, Henry confronts Alicia, who refuses to let him stop the presses and run the right story. They have an awkward fistfight before Alicia prevails, then fires Henry.

After having a drink with McDougal at a journalist watering hole, Alicia has a change of heart after McDougal tells her this would be the first time the paper knowingly ran a false story. But before she can reach the press room on a pay phone, she is hit in the leg by a stray bullet fired by a drunk city official who had gone to the bar to confront McDougal over columns attacking him.

Meanwhile, Henry arrives home just as Martha is being rushed to the hospital for an emergency cesarean section. As doctors prep Martha for surgery, in another part of the hospital, Alicia insists on calling the Sun to change the front page before allowing doctors to treat her.

The next morning, Alicia lies in her hospital bed reading a copy of the Sun with the headline "They Didn't Do It!" Henry stops by the nursery to see his newborn son, then goes to Martha's room. As he lies down with her, a news anchor on the bedside radio reports that the youths have been released thanks to the Sun's exclusive scoop.

== Cast ==
- Michael Keaton as Henry Hackett
- Glenn Close as Alicia Clark
- Marisa Tomei as Martha Hackett
- Randy Quaid as Michael McDougal
- Robert Duvall as Bernie White
- Jason Alexander as Marion Sandusky
- Spalding Gray as Paul Bladden
- Catherine O'Hara as Susan
- Lynne Thigpen as Janet
- Jack Kehoe as Phil
- Roma Maffia as Carmen
- Clint Howard as Ray Blaisch
- Geoffrey Owens as Lou
- Amelia Campbell as Robin
- Jill Hennessy as Deanne White
- William Prince as Henry's father
- Augusta Dabney as Henry's mother
- Bruce Altman as Carl
- Jack McGee as Wilder
- Bobo Lewis as Anna
- Edward Hibbert as Jerry
- Jim Meskimen as Tom
- Siobhan Fallon as Lisa
- Rance Howard as Alicia's Doctor
- Michael Harney as Officer Richie
- Michael Moran as Chuck
- Cedric Young as Martha's Paramedic
- Michael Countryman as Emmett
- James Ritz as A.C. Repairmen
- Sally-Jane Heit as Grace
- Herbert Rubens as Tony
- Jason Robards as Graham Keightley

== Production ==
Screenwriter Stephen Koepp, a senior editor at Time magazine, collaborated on the screenplay with his brother David and together they initially came up with "A Day in the Life of a Paper" as their premise. David said, "We wanted a regular day, though this is far from regular." They also wanted to "look at the financial pressures of a paper to get on the street and still tell the truth." After they created the character of a pregnant reporter (played by Marisa Tomei) who is married to the metro editor, both of the Koepps' wives became pregnant. Around that time, Universal Pictures greenlighted the project.

For his next project after Far and Away (1992), director Ron Howard wanted to do something on the newspaper industry. Steven Spielberg recommended that he get in touch with David Koepp. Howard intended to pitch an idea to the writer, who instead wanted to talk about how much he loved the script for his 1989 film Parenthood. The filmmaker remembers, "I found that pretty flattering, of course, so I asked about the subject of his work-in-progress. The answer was music to my ears: 24 hours at a tabloid newspaper." Howard read their script and remembers, "I liked the fact that it dealt with the behind-the-scenes of headlines. But I also connected with the characters trying to cope during this 24-hour period, desperately trying to find this balance in their personal lives, past and present."

To prepare for the film, Howard made several visits to the New York Post and Daily News (which inspired the fictional newspaper in the film). He remembers, "You'd hear stuff from columnists and reporters about some jerk they'd worked with ... I heard about the scorned female reporter who wound up throwing hot coffee in some guy's crotch when she found out he was fooling around with someone else." These types of stories inspired Howard to change the gender of the managing editor, a role that Glenn Close would later play. Howard felt the Koepps' script featured a newsroom that was too male-dominated. The writers agreed and changed the character's name from Alan to Alicia but kept the dialogue the same. According to David Koepp, "Anything else would be trying to figure out, 'How would a woman in power behave?' And it shouldn't be about that. It should be about how a person in power behaves, and since that behavior is judged one way when it's a man, why should it be judged differently if it's a woman?"

Howard met with some of the top newspapermen in New York, including former Post editor Pete Hamill and columnists Jimmy Breslin and Mike McAlary (who inspired the character played by Randy Quaid in the movie). They told the filmmaker how some reporters bypass traffic jams by putting emergency police lights on their cars (a trick used in the movie). Hamill and McAlary also can be seen in cameos.

Howard wanted to explore the nature of tabloid journalism. "I kept asking, 'Are you embarrassed to be working at the New York Post? Would you rather be working at The Washington Post or The New York Times?' They kept saying they loved the environment, the style of journalism." The model for Keaton's character was metro editor Richie Esposito of the Daily News. Howard said, "He was well-dressed but rumpled, mid-to-late 30s, overworked, very articulate and fast-talking. And very, very smart. When I saw him, I thought, that's Henry Hackett. As written."

The director also was intrigued by the unsavory aspect of these papers. "They were interested in celebrities who were under investigation or had humiliated themselves in some way. I could see they would gleefully glom onto a story that would be very humiliating for someone. They didn't care about that. If they believed their source, they would go with it happily."

In addition to being influenced by Ben Hecht and Charles MacArthur's famous stage play The Front Page, Howard studied newspaper movies from the 1930s and 1940s. Howard said, "Every studio made them, and then they kind of vanished. One of the reasons I thought it would make a good movie today is that it feels fresh and different."

Filming of The Paper began on July 19, 1993, and wrapped on September 30, 1993. One of Howard's goals was to cram in as much information about a 24-hour day in the newspaper business as possible. He said, "I'm gonna get as many little details right as possible: a guy having to rewrite a story and it bugs the hell out of him, another guy talking to a reporter on the phone and saying, 'Well, it's not Watergate for God's sake.' Little, tiny—you can't even call them subplots—that most people on the first screening won't even notice, probably. It's just sort of newsroom background.'"

== Reception ==
=== Box office ===
The Paper was given a limited release in five theaters on March 18, 1994, where it grossed $175,507 on its opening weekend. It expanded its release the following weekend to 1,092 theaters where it made $7 million over that weekend. The film went on to gross $38.8 million in the United States and Canada and $9.6 million in the rest of the world for a total of $48.4 million worldwide.

Speaking about the film's box office shortcomings in 2025, Ron Howard said: "It never got a foothold outside of six or seven cities that still had major newspapers. That was already a dying idea — small towns had lost their papers and so forth. It played like a $100 million movie in New York and Boston and Toronto and San Francisco and L.A. and Chicago. Everywhere else, it was a disaster."

=== Critical response ===
The Paper received positive reviews from critics and holds an 86% rating on Rotten Tomatoes based on 37 reviews. The consensus states: "Fast and frenetic, The Paper captures the energy of the newsroom thanks to its cast and director on first-rate form." On Metacritic, the film has a score of 70 out of 100 based on 30 critics, indicating "generally favorable reviews". Audiences surveyed by CinemaScore gave the film an average grade of "B+" on a scale of A+ to F.

In his review for The Boston Globe, Jay Carr wrote, "It takes a certain panache to incorporate the ever-present threat of your own extinction into the giddy tradition of the newspaper comedy, but The Paper pulls it off. There's no point pretending that I'm objective about this one. I know it's not Citizen Kane, but it pushes my buttons". Peter Stack of the San Francisco Chronicle wrote, "In the end, The Paper offers splashy entertainment that's a lot like a daily newspaper itself—hot news cools fast." Entertainment Weekly gave the film a "B" rating and Owen Gleiberman praised Michael Keaton's performance: "Keaton is at his most urgent and winning here. His fast-break, neurotic style—owlish stare, motor mouth—is perfect for the role of a compulsive news junkie who lives for the rush of his job." But Gleiberman felt that the film was "hampered by its warmed-over plot, which seems designed to teach Henry and the audience lessons".

In her review for The New York Times, Janet Maslin was critical of the film. "Each principal has a problem that is conveniently addressed during this one-day interlude, thanks to a screenplay (by David Koepp and Stephen Koepp) that feels like the work of a committee. The film's general drift is to start these people off at fever pitch and then let them gradually unveil life's inner meaning as the tale trudges toward resolution." Rita Kempley, in her review for The Washington Post, wrote, "Ron Howard still thinks women belong in the nursery instead of the newsroom. Screenwriters David Koepp of Jurassic Park and his brother Stephen (of Time magazine) are witty and on target in terms of character, but their message in terms of male and female relations is a prehistoric one."

In an interview, New York journalist and author Robert Caro praised The Paper, calling it "a great newspaper movie."

== Year-end lists ==
- 10th – Christopher Sheid, The Munster Times
- Top 10 (listed alphabetically, not ranked) – Mike Mayo, The Roanoke Times
- Honorable mention – Bob Carlton, The Birmingham News
