= Yolanda Vázquez =

British actress (born 1960)

- Born: 5 November 1960 (age 65); Cádiz, Spain
- Occupation: Actress
- Years active: 1987–present
- Spouse: Jonathan Phillips (1989–present)

Yolanda Vázquez (born 5 November 1960) is a Spanish-born British actress. She plays in film, television and theatre, and is best known for appearing in the film The Air Up There. More recently, she had a cameo in the well-received British indie science fiction thriller, Children of Men. Vázquez has appeared in productions of Shakespeare's A Midsummer Night's Dream (for the Royal Shakespeare Company) and Much Ado About Nothing.

Notable television appearances include the part of Maria in The Final Cut, the third series in the House of Cards trilogy. She was also in an episode of Midsomer Murders Who Killed Cock Robin? (2001), where she played a Spanish riding instructor. In 1993, she appeared as a tango dancer named Lola in an episode of Agatha Christie's Poirot.

In 1987 she hosted the BBC language course Espana Viva.

== Filmography ==
Year	Title	Role	Notes
1988	American Roulette	Isabella	
1988	Buster	Hospital Receptionist	
1993	The Case-Book of Sherlock Holmes	Carlotta	TV series (1 episode: "The Last Vampyre")
1993	Agatha Christie's Poirot	Lola	1 episode: The Yellow Iris
1994	The Air Up There	Sister Susan	
1997	Peak Practice	Clare Shearer	11 episodes
1999	Notting Hill	Interpreter	
2000	Proof of Life	Notary	
2002	Morvern Callar	Spanish Mother	
2006	Children of Men	Spanish Woman	
2011	Top Boy	Yolanda	
2016	Anti Matter	Mariana Carter	
