= The Air Up There =

1994 American sports comedy film

- Theatrical release poster
- Directed by: Paul Michael Glaser
- Written by: Max Apple
- Produced by: Robert W. Cort; Ted Field; Rosalie Swedlin
- Starring: Kevin Bacon
- Cinematography: Dick Pope
- Edited by: Michael A. Polakow
- Music by: David Newman
- Production companies: Hollywood Pictures; Interscope Communications; PolyGram Filmed Entertainment; Nomura Babcock & Brown
- Distributed by: Buena Vista Pictures Distribution
- Release date: January 7, 1994
- Running time: 107 minutes
- Country: United States
- Language: English
- Budget: $17 million
- Box office: $21 million

The Air Up There is a 1994 American sports comedy film directed by Paul Michael Glaser and starring Kevin Bacon and Charles Gitonga Maina with Yolanda Vazquez as Sister Susan.

== Plot ==
Jimmy Dolan is a college basketball assistant coach for St. Joseph University who wants to find a new star for his team since he believes this will get him a promotion to head coach at the school. He sees a home video of a prospect named Saleh and travels to Kenya to recruit him. Upon arriving in this country, Dolan finds himself confronted not only with the challenges of basketball but also with the challenges of adjusting to and learning how to live in the midst of a brand-new culture. Though Dolan is initially opposed by Saleh's father who is also the leader of the village, he later agrees to let his son play. Dolan and Saleh both teach each other life lessons before they take the court for one final game with everything on the line. One of the most dramatic scenes in the film involves the instruction of Saleh by Dolan regarding the "Jimmy Dolan Shake and Bake."

== Cast ==
- Kevin Bacon as Jimmy Dolan, a college basketball coach
- Charles Gitonga Maina as Saleh, a basketball player from a village in Kenya
- Yolanda Vazquez as Sister Susan
- Winston Ntshona as Urudu
- Mabutho "Kid" Sithole as Nyaga
- Sean McCann as Ray Fox
- Dennis Patrick as Father O'Hara
- Ilo Mutombo as Mifundo
- Nigel Miguel as Halawi

== Production ==
For scenes taking place in North America, the film was shot in Toronto and Hamilton, Ontario, Canada. Copps Coliseum stood in for the University's arena. Scenes in Africa were shot in Kenya and Hoedspruit, South Africa.

== Reception ==
The Air Up There received negative reviews from critics. The Austin Chronicle mentions its "timeworn formula" and "cultural imperialism". The New York Times review points to a plot similar to several other Disney movies. The film holds a rating of 21% on Rotten Tomatoes from 28 reviews.

== Year-end lists ==
- Dishonorable mention – John Hurley, Staten Island Advance

== See also ==
- List of basketball films
