= Brendan Ford =

American actor

- Occupation: Television actor

Brendan Ford is a television and repertory actor who has appeared in an episode of the science fiction show Babylon 5, among other shows. He has played the lead on the Los Angeles stage in Brendan Behan's Hostage, Ibsen's A Doll's House, Break of Day, Camelot, and Ernest in Love.

Ford played Captain Kendrick in the NBC soap opera television series Days of Our Lives. He is from Los Angeles, California.

== Filmography ==
Year	Title	Role	Notes
1994	Clear and Present Danger	Coast Guardsman #2	
1998	Merchants of Venus	Cop #2	
1999	Clubland	Patron #3	
2002	We Were Soldiers	Jump Coordinator	Uncredited
2011	Weeds	Colm Mulcahey	
2014	Henry Danger	Carl Manchester	
