= Rino Piccolo =

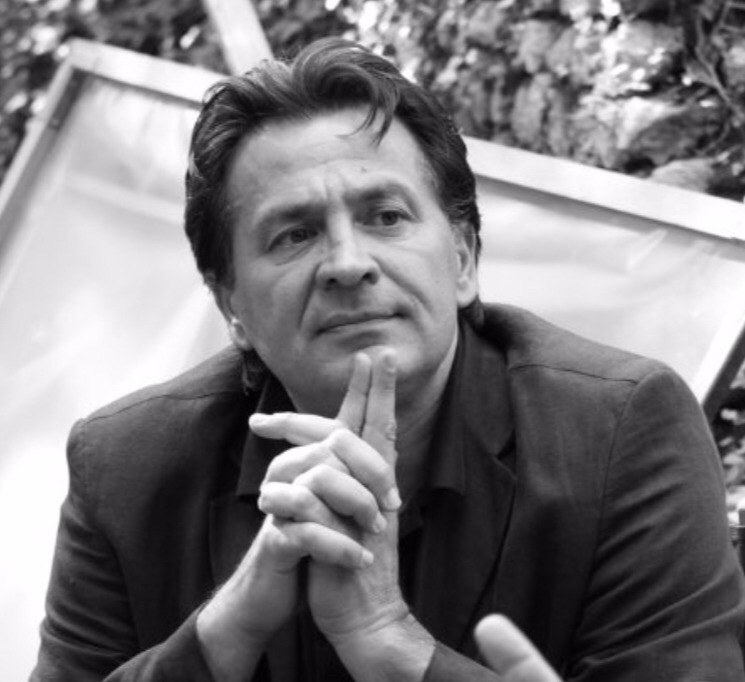

Rino Piccolo (born 14 February) is an international film producer, and film commissioner. Through his academic studies, he achieved a doctoral degree in Business Economics at the University of Federico II in Naples, and a diploma at the Università popolare dello spettacolo, a three-year theatre and arts school.

== Biography ==
In 1994 Rino Piccolo experienced the Actors Studio under such moderators as Sidney Pollack, Barry Primus, Anthony Franciosa, Martin Landau, Mark Rydell and Shelley Winters. Between 1994 and 1996 produced three short films, amongst which "La Promessa" received a grant from the Italian Ministry of Cultural Affairs as a short film of national "cultural interest".

In 1998 Piccolo was one of the first to establish a film commission in Italy (Campania Film Commission), giving support and assisting international film productions including Star Wars: Episode I – The Phantom Menace, Mission: Impossible III, The Talented Mr. Ripley, The Sopranos, and The Life Aquatic with Steve Zissou.

In 2001 Piccolo was appointed as the Italian Film Commission's and cinema delegate to present to the Indian Government the new national agreement between the two countries and promote new opportunities of international development. While in Italy he has the opportunity to specialize in documentary production, assisting many BBC, National Geographic Channel and Discovery Channel projects including Pompeii, Oceans, Caravaggio, and Naked Earth: Volcanoes.

In 2002, amongst other Italian film commissioners, Piccolo founded the first Association of Italian Film Commissions. He has been elected vice-president twice in a row. The same year, he was elected director of the Association of Film Commissioners International; in 2004, he was re-elected. While in that position, he has elaborated international educational programs for upcoming Film Commissioners in different countries of the world. In the next two years, he conducted seminars on "Film-induced economy/tourism" and organized film trade shows internationally.

In 2007 he was appointed as General Director of the Provincial Latina Film Commission in the region of Lazio in Italy. In 2008 he established the first "Latina Film Fund" addressed to national and international documentary filmmakers. In 2009 he collaborated on the publishing of the book Latina. Terra di Cinema, a review of all films produced in the province of Latina. As a producer, in 2010 he was involved in the international production of Maradona by Emir Kusturica. Also in 2010, he presided over commissions for a few film festivals in Italy.

In 2012, has been selected as a "Film Tourism" expert to be a Speaker at the AFCI Cineposium held in Cheungpung, South Korea. In 2013 has presented the new Region of Lazio 15 million euro "Audiovisual fund" to the Spanish film Industry at the Italian Embassy in Madrid.

Throughout the years he has collaborated on international film projects such as: The Borgias, Angels and Demons, Maradona by Kusturica, The man from U.N.C.L.E., Spectre, Zoolander 2, 7 minuti and many others.

In 2015, publishes a book entitled "Terra di Cinema - Cinema Land" and several other essays on Film Commission work both nationally and internationally.

In 2017 he establishes an educational program for film production professionals in the region of Lazio, with Master Classes such as Set Designer with Francesco Frigeri, Executive Production with Alessandro Calosci and Acting with Michele Placido. In March of the same year, he was invited by the National Film School - Scuola Nazionale di Cinema in Rome as a guest speaker to show Film Commission work in Italy.

From 2006 to the present has been appointed President of the Latina Film Commission., a local Government film support entity.

In 2022 produces the feature film "Song of the fly" directed by Michele Pagano, which won the Best Screenplay Award at Queens World Film Festival in New York.
