= Archie Lang (actor) =

American actor

- Born: July 14, 1920; Chicago, Illinois
- Died: February 17, 2016 (aged 95); Elizabethtown, Kentucky
- Occupation: Actor
- Years active: 1978–96
- Partner: Georgietta Raikes
- Children: 2

Archie L. Lang (July 14, 1920 – February 17, 2016) was an American actor known for Going Berserk, Reform School Girls, Blow Out, Jinxed, and Bonanza: The Return.

== Early life ==
Lang was born in 1920 in Chicago, Illinois to Archie and Gladys Lang. He had 4 siblings. Lang graduated from St. Benedict's College. He received a master's degree in music from Columbia University in New York City. Lang entered the United States Navy during World War II.

== Career ==
Lang started his career as a singer in the Holiday Ice Review. He was the television announcer and program host for WKRP in Cincinnati. Lang produced the nationally renowned Ruth Page version of The Nutcracker for the Chicago Tribune Charities. He guest starred in many television programs including Benson, The Incredible Hulk, The Love Boat, Knots Landing, Three's Company, Love Street, and Early Edition. Lang was in several theatre productions including Michael Nesmith's Elephant Parts which won a Grammy Award at the 24th ceremony. He was in the made-for-TV-movies Baby Comes Home, Children of Divorce, Seduced, and Bonanza: The Return. He was in several films including Jinxed, Blow Out, Reform School Girls, and Going Berserk. Lang performed at the Arie Crown Theatre for 25 years.

== Personal life and death ==
Lang was with Georgietta Raikes for more than 20 years. He had one daughter (Denise) and one son (Michael). Lang died on February 17, 2016, at aged 95 in Kensington Center in Elizabethtown, Kentucky.

== Filmography ==
=== Film ===
Year	Title	Role	Notes
1981	Blow Out	Mixer	Thriller film, written and directed by Brian De Palma.
1982	Jinxed	Tahoe Second Monitor	Comedy-drama film directed by Don Siegel.
1983	Going Berserk	Man with Bag	Comedy film directed by David Steinberg.
1986	Monster in the Closet	TV Newscaster	Horror comedy directed and written by Bob Dahlin.
1986	Reform School Girls	Judge	Written and directed by Tom DeSimone.
1993	Dream Lover	Judge #1	Erotic drama film written and directed by Nicholas Kazan.

=== Television ===
Year	Title	Role	Notes
1978–82	WKRP in Cincinnati	Television announcer and program host	Contract role
1979	Benson	Guest	Episode: "The President's Double" (S 1:Ep 3)
1979	The Incredible Hulk	Justice of the Peace	Episode: "My Favorite Magician" (S 3:Ep 5)
1979	Kate Loves a Mystery	Jim Foster	Episode: "Off the Record" (S 2:Ep 3)
1980	Baby Comes Home	Delivery Room Doctor	Made-for-TV-Movie directed by Waris Hussein.
1980	Children of Divorce	Judge Hammond	Made-for-TV-Movie directed and screenplay by Joanna Lee.
1980	The Love Boat	Minister	Episode: "She Stole His Heart/Return of the Captain's Brother/Swag and Mag" (S 4:Ep 9)
1981	The Waltons	Buck Vernon	Episode: "The Victims" (S 9:Ep16)
1981	Golden Gate	Guest	Made-for-TV-Movie directed by Paul Wendkos.
1981	Dallas	Senator Lee	Episode: "The Big Shut Down" (S 5:Ep 6)
1981	Knots Landing	Harvey Franklin	Episode: "Knots Landing" (S 3:Ep 5)
1982	King's Crossing	Principal	Episode: "Keepers Of The Ring (Pilot)" (S 1:Ep 1)
1982	Bring 'Em Back Alive	Well-To-Do-Man	Episode: "There's One Born Every Minute" (S 1:Ep 3)
1982	General Hospital	Forbes	
1983	Three's Company	Barry	Episode: "Now You See It, Now You Don't" (S 8:Ep 10)
1984	Simon & Simon	Minister	Episode: "Dear Lovesick" (S 3:Ep 14)
1985	A Reason to Live	Mike	Made-for-TV-Movie directed by Peter Levin.
1985	Seduced	Executive	Made-for-TV-Movie directed by Jerrold Freedman.
1985	Murder, She Wrote	Minister	Episode: "Funeral at Fifty-mile" (S 1:Ep 22)
1985	Highway to Heaven	Doctor	Episode: "The Smile in the Third Row" (S 2:Ep 8)
1986	The A-Team	Mr. Maitland	Episode: "Beneath the Surface" (S 4:19)
1989	Growing Pains	Minister	Episode: "Mike and Julie's Wedding" (S 5:Ep 2)
1989–90	Dallas	Senator Lee	Recurring
1990	Life Goes On	Henry Mifflin	Episode: "The Spring Fling" (S 1:Ep 22)
1993	Bonanza: The Return	Dr. Green	Made-for-TV-Movie sequel to both the 1959–1973 television series Bonanza and the 1988 made-for-TV-Movie Bonanza: The Next Generation directed by Jerry Jameson.
1993	Harts of the West	Frank	Episode: "Jake's Brother: (S 1:Ep 8)
1994	Love Street	Older Tucker	Episode: "Hope's Creek" (S 2:Ep 9)
1994	The Enemy Within	Priest	HBO Made-for-TV-Movie remake of the 1964 film Seven Days in May directed by Jonathan Darby.
1996	Early Edition	Frank	Episode: "The Wrong Man" (S 1:Ep 10)
