= Charles Gitonga Maina =

Kenyan actor and basketball player

Charles Gìtonga Maina
- Born: 1976 (age 49–50)
- Occupations: actor, basketball player

Charles Gìtonga Maina (born 1976) is a Kenyan-born former actor and basketball player. He is best known for his co-starring role in the 1994 film The Air Up There.

== Early life ==
Charles Gìtonga Maina was born in the Buruburu neighborhood of Nairobi, Kenya. His father was an auditor with a telecommunications firm and his mother was a nurse. Maina is the third of four children, and belongs to the Kikuyu ethnic group. At the age of 14, he learned to play basketball playing barefoot with friends on a dirt court. In 1991, Maina won the 1991 Nairobi Slam Dunk Championship. Although he originally wanted to study computers and business at the University of Nairobi, Maina decided to pursue basketball instead.

== The Air Up There ==
At the age of 17, Maina heard of auditions for the film The Air Up There. The film from Hollywood Pictures would feature a tall African basketball player as a prospect under the wing of an American coach, which would be played by Kevin Bacon. Maina auditioned for the lead role, describing himself as a "dunkaholic". According to director Paul Michael Glaser, this was part of what landed him the role. Maina and a friend were chosen among 46 other players, and flown to Los Angeles for a final audition. According to Maina, this was the first time he'd left Kenya. In the end, he was chosen for the lead role of Saleh, a member of the fictional Winabi tribe in Kenya (which were loosely based on the Samburu people) which is sought out by Bacon's character to play in the US.

Most of the filming took place in Kenya and South Africa, with local cast and crew members. Former UCLA player and co-star Nigel Miguel said of Maina "He was just a sweet kid, and that's what was needed for this character". Former NBA MVP Bob McAdoo, who served as the film's technical advisor, saw potential for Maina to play college basketball in the US, saying "just seeing his enthusiasm and his size, I knew there was something there". Although the film received negative reviews, critics referred to Maina's performance as "warmly appealing".

The year after the film was released, Maina guest starred in the episode "Lostland" of the television series SeaQuest DSV, as Professor Obatu and his ancestor Deucalion.

== Basketball career ==
After the film, Maina decided to stay in the United States to pursue college opportunities, under the advice of McAdoo, with whom he was staying. He played his first full season at Barton County Community College in Great Bend, Kansas. Although he began as a bench player, Maina became a starter halfway through the season. After one year, he transferred to Miami-Dade Kendall Community College to be closer to McAdoo, where he also played as a starter and set several school records for blocked shots. Eventually, McAdoo contacted Jeff Price, head coach of Lynn University in Boca Raton, Florida. As a result, Maina received a basketball scholarship from 1997 to 1999. His coach would not allow him to use the 'Jimmy Dolan Shake and Bake' move in competition games. Maina still holds the Lynn University record for most blocks in a single game (11), which he achieved against Barry University on December 7, 1998. During the 1997–98 season, his team reached the NCAA D-II semifinals, with Price praising "his timing and ability to block shots".

After his two years of eligibility, Maina decided to try professional basketball in Europe, despite McAdoo's reluctance. He left the country to try out for a team in Greece, but it didn't pan out. After that, Maina was unable to return to the US due to visa problems, and was forced to return to Kenya.

== Later years ==
After returning to Kenya, Maina moved back with his parents in Buruburu. In March 2003, he was assaulted by two men on the street who stabbed and hit him with a stone. Maina recovered, after spending three weeks in a hospital with a broken jaw and other injuries. Several years later, he also contracted tuberculosis, which led him to bouts of depression. As of 2023, Maina still lived in the area.
