= Steel Arena =

Steel Arena may refer to:

- Steel Arena (arena), the home arena of the ice hockey club HC Košice in Slovakia
- Steel Arena (film), a 1973 film
