= Mike Hill (film editor) =

American film editor (1949–2023)

Mike Hill ACE
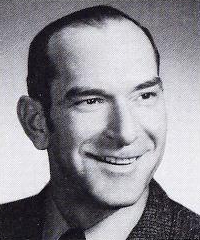
- Born: Michael J. Hill; March 24, 1949; Omaha, Nebraska, U.S.
- Died: January 5, 2023 (aged 73); Omaha, Nebraska, U.S.
- Occupation: Film editor

Michael J. Hill ACE (March 24, 1949 – January 5, 2023) was an American film editor. He and his editing partner Dan Hanley had a longstanding, notable collaboration with director Ron Howard, having edited all of Howard's films from Night Shift (1982) to In the Heart of the Sea (2015). They won an Academy Award for the film Apollo 13 (1995), and the BAFTA Award for the film Rush (2013). Hill was a member of the American Cinema Editors (ACE).

== Early life and education ==
Hill was born and raised in Omaha, Nebraska, and received a criminal justice degree at the University of Nebraska at Omaha in 1972. His first job was as a guard at Chino prison in California.

== Career ==
He then entered the film editing profession, and worked on several television programs and on two feature films before starting his association with Hanley and Howard on Night Shift (1982). After many years in California, Hill moved back to Nebraska after meeting and marrying his wife LeAnne. They have one daughter together born in the late 1980s Jesica Hill. In addition to his continuing work on major studio films with Howard, Hill has edited independent films produced in Nebraska such as Full Ride (2001).

Apollo 13 was listed as the 48th best-edited film of all time in a 2012 survey of members of the Motion Picture Editors Guild. In addition to Apollo 13, Hanley and Hill have been nominated for Academy Awards for Howard's A Beautiful Mind (2001), Cinderella Man (2005), and Frost/Nixon (2008). Hanley and Hill's longstanding partnership, which includes 21 films through the 2015 In the Heart of the Sea, may be unique among major film editors. An important aspect of the partnership is that the two editors have developed a sufficiently uniform style that they can simply split up the scenes of each film without specialization.

Hill was elected as a member of the American Cinema Editors.

== Death ==
Hill died from cryptogenic organizing pneumonia at his home in Omaha, on January 5, 2023, at the age of 73.

== Selected filmography ==
=== Films directed by Ron Howard ===
- Night Shift (1982)
- Splash (1984)
- Cocoon (1985)
- Gung Ho (1986)
- Willow (1988)
- Parenthood (1989)
- Backdraft (1991)
- Far and Away (1992)
- The Paper (1994)
- Apollo 13 (1995)
- Ransom (1996)
- EDtv (1999)
- How the Grinch Stole Christmas (2000)
- A Beautiful Mind (2001)
- The Missing (2003)
- Cinderella Man (2005)
- The Da Vinci Code (2006)
- Frost/Nixon (2008)
- Angels & Demons (2009)
- The Dilemma (2011)
- Rush (2013)
- In the Heart of the Sea (2015)

=== Films with other directors ===
- Armed and Dangerous (Mark L. Lester, 1986)
- Pet Sematary (Mary Lambert, 1989)
- Problem Child (Dennis Dugan, 1990)
- Full Ride (Mark Hoeger, 2002)

== See also ==
- List of film director and editor collaborations
