= Daniel P. Hanley =

American film editor (born 1955)

- Born: 1955 (age 70–71)
- Occupation: Film editor
- Awards: Film Editing 1995 Apollo 13

Daniel P. Hanley, A.C.E. (born 1955) is an American film editor with more than 30 feature film credits.

== Career ==
Hanley and his editing partner Mike Hill have had a notable collaboration with the director Ron Howard, having edited all of Howard's films since Night Shift (1982). They won an Academy Award for the film Apollo 13 (1995), and the BAFTA Award for the film Rush (2013). Apollo 13 was listed as the 48th best-edited film of all time in a 2012 survey of members of the Motion Picture Editors Guild.

In addition to Apollo 13, Hanley and Hill have been nominated for Academy Awards for Ron Howard's A Beautiful Mind (2001), Cinderella Man (2005), and Frost/Nixon (2008). Hanley has been elected as a member of the American Cinema Editors.

== Selected filmography ==
=== Films directed by Ron Howard ===
- Night Shift (1982)
- Splash (1984)
- Cocoon (1985)
- Gung Ho (1986)
- Willow (1988)
- Parenthood (1989)
- Backdraft (1991)
- Far and Away (1992)
- The Paper (1994)
- Apollo 13 (1995)
- Ransom (1996)
- EDtv (1999)
- How the Grinch Stole Christmas (2000)
- A Beautiful Mind (2001)
- The Missing (2003)
- Cinderella Man (2005)
- The Da Vinci Code (2006)
- Frost/Nixon (2008)
- Angels & Demons (2009)
- The Dilemma (2011)
- Rush (2013)
- In the Heart of the Sea (2015)
- Inferno (2016)

=== Films with other directors ===
- Armed and Dangerous (Mark L. Lester, 1986)
- No Man's Land (Peter Werner, 1987)
- Pet Sematary (Mary Lambert, 1989)
- Problem Child (Dennis Dugan, 1990)
- Cop and a Half (Henry Winkler, 1993)
- Jonah Hex (Jimmy Hayward, 2010)

== See also ==
- List of film director and editor collaborations
