= Angel of Mine (film) =

2019 film

- Theatrical release poster
- Directed by: Kim Farrant
- Written by: Luke Davies; David Regal
- Produced by: Su Armstrong; Brian R. Etting; Josh H. Etting
- Starring: Noomi Rapace; Yvonne Strahovski; Luke Evans; Richard Roxburgh
- Cinematography: Andrew Commis
- Edited by: Jack Hutchings
- Music by: Gabe Noel
- Production companies: Magna Entertainment; Garlin Pictures; R7 Entertainment; Rockaway Films; SixtyFourSix
- Distributed by: Lionsgate
- Release dates: 14 August 2019 (MIFF); 30 August 2019 (U.S.)
- Running time: 97 minutes
- Countries: United States; Australia
- Language: English
- Box office: $230,193

Angel of Mine is a 2019 Australian-American psychological thriller film directed by Kim Farrant and written by Luke Davies and David Regal. It stars Noomi Rapace, Luke Evans, Yvonne Strahovski and Richard Roxburgh. It is a remake of the 2008 French film Mark of an Angel.

It had its world premiere at the Melbourne International Film Festival on 14 August 2019. It was released on 30 August 2019 by Lionsgate.

== Plot ==
Lizzie is distraught with the loss of her newborn daughter Rosie, who died in a hospital fire along with 12 mothers and babies. 7 years later she's desperately trying to process the steps of grieving and raise her son, Thomas, who she has shared custody of with her ex, Mike. At a birthday party for her son’s friend, she sees a little girl whom she immediately believes to be Rosie. She befriends the girl’s parents, Claire and Bernard, by faking interest in their for-sale house. Their sons become friends and she learns the girl’s name is Lola.

She starts to lose a grip on her reality and frequently finds ways to be alone with Lola. Lizzie becomes so consumed with watching her that she loses her job and forgets to pick up her son. Her ex-husband, parents and therapist confront her at home and Mike threatens to take their son away if she doesn’t get help. She tells them that she’s almost sure Rosie survived the fire and is now Lola.

Lizzie elects to gather DNA evidence to prove her suspicion but after several incidents Claire has told her to stay away. Lizzie tries to sneak into their going-away party, but is soon caught and escorted out. She waits in her car and sneaks back in as the guests are leaving. She hides and falls asleep in Lola’s closet. When she wakes up she takes Lola’s hairbrush to test and tries to sneak out. Lizzie is almost out the door when Claire sees her. A violent struggle ensues and Lizzie tells her to kill her because she’ll never stop. Claire emotionally admits that she saved Lola. Her baby died of smoke inhalation and she found a crying baby with a woman face down on the floor. She presumed Lizzie dead and presented the baby as her own. Then it’s shown that Bernard and the two children were standing in the hall and heard her confession. Lizzie tells Mike the news and he apologizes. Claire is then arrested for child theft, kidnapping and custodial interference.

Some time later Lizzie is seen with her family preparing for their first visit with Lola. Thomas asks how often they will see her and Mike replies they’ll know more after Claire’s trial. Bernard brings in Lola and a tearful Claire exchanges a look with Lizzie from the car. Lola is reunited with her biological family.

== Cast ==
- Yvonne Strahovski as Claire
- Noomi Rapace as Lizzie
- Luke Evans as Mike
- Richard Roxburgh as Bernard
- Rachel Gordon as Ellen
- Tracy Mann as Lena

== Production ==
In February 2018, it was announced Noomi Rapace had joined the cast of the film, with Kim Farrant directing from a screenplay by Luke Davies and David Regal. In March 2018, Yvonne Strahovski joined the cast of the film. In May 2018, Luke Evans joined the cast of the film.

== Release ==
Angel of Mine had its world premiere at the Melbourne International Film Festival on 14 August 2019. It was released in the United States on 30 August 2019, by Lionsgate, and later on DVD and digital media by R & R Films.

== Response ==
On review aggregator Rotten Tomatoes, Angel of Mine holds an approval rating of 76%, based on 21 reviews, with an average rating of 6.6/10. On Metacritic, the film has a weighted average score of 47/100, based on 10 critics, indicating "mixed or average" reviews.
