= Dusty Russell =

American stunt driver

- Born: Robert Shuman Hanna; March 12, 1934
- Died: July 9, 2020 (aged 86); Vancouver, Washington

Robert Shuman Hanna (March 12, 1934 – December 22, 2020) was a record-breaking American stunt driver and motorsports promoter who performed under the stage name “Dusty Russell." He was the star of the 1973 action movie Steel Arena, on which he also served as associate producer.

The film a fictionalized account of his career as an auto daredevil who specialized in jumping a speeding car over other vehicles, including flipping a car in mid-air. The film also portrays Hanna as a demolition derby driver and moonshine runner.

In addition to motorsport promotion, Hanna had a career as an executive in the semi-conductor industry in Washington State.

In 2009 interview, talking about one of the stunt drivers he was promoting, Tyler Moore, Hanna said, “I haven’t come across anybody like him for years...he has the same passion for crashing cars that I’ve had all my life.”

In 1951, Hanna began stunt-driving at the age of 15 in Idaho, appearing with Joie Chitwood Auto Daredevils.

His career as auto daredevil Dusty Russell stretched over 50+ years, and he appeared in his last show as a stunt driver in 2005. He continued to be an auto thrill show promoter as World Champion Auto Daredevils after his retirement as a stunt driver.

In his career, Hanna estimated he crashed over 3,000 cars and jumped a collective 12 miles through the air doing the dive bomber stunt. As Dusty Russell, he once attempted to dive bomb a car 200 feet over a Sacramento lake, a stunt that had already claimed two lives, but failed. Equipping his stock car with a breathing apparatus should he fall into the lake and the car sink, he did go into the drink but survived with an injured nose.

Interviewed in 2010 about the final auto thrill show he produced, Hanna said of the auto daredevils who made their names in the 1960s, “Most of those guys have come and gone.... The only one still standing is me.”

== Steel Arena ==
Filmmaker Mark L. Lester saw Hanna and the other stunt drivers who appear in the movie at an auto daredevils show in Berkeley, California, where they performed as The Circus of Death. Lester signed them up to star in a fictional story about their touring the stunt driver circuit. The actual drivers appeared as fictionalized versions of themselves and performed all their own stunts.

The movie, which was budgeted at $150,000, was shot in 21 days. Hanna was credited as associate producer under his real name, Robert Hanna. The movie was first released in the Atlanta metropolitan area in early April 1973.

== Car flip world record ==
The final stunt in the film, a 100-foot jump that Hanna made and which his character dies performing, actually broke the world record, which it does in the story-line of the film. At the time of the film's release in the five-county Atlanta film market, Hanna made an appearance at Atlanta 500 NASCAR race, as a featured attraction. Hanna flipped a stock car in the air and landed 157 feet after a five-foot ramp, setting a new world record. He suffered a broken nose performing the stunt.
