= Garlin Pictures =

- Headquarters: Sherman Oaks, California, United States
- Key people: Joshua H. Etting; Brian R. Etting
- Website: www.garlinpictures.com

Garlin Pictures is Joshua H. Etting and Brian R. Etting's production company. They made Warner Brothers comedies such as Malibu's Most Wanted as well as Broken, Funny or Die, and Relative Strangers starring Danny DeVito. Besides working with Warner Brothers, they also worked with Lionsgate for the film Reclaim.
