= The Base 2 =

The Base 2 may refer to:

- Base 2, the binary numeral system
- The Base 2 (film), also known as The Base 2: Guilty as Charged, a 2000 American action-adventure film directed by Mark L. Lester
