= Brian R. Etting =

American screenwriter

- Occupations: Producer, director, writer
- Years active: 1996-present

Brian R. Etting is an American producer, director, and screenwriter known for producing Broken, Funny or Die, A Good Old Fashioned Orgy, and Relative Strangers starring Danny DeVito. He also executive produced Drunk History: Douglass & Lincoln which won Best Short Film at the 2010 Sundance Film Festival. Etting also owns his own production company with Josh Etting called Garlin Pictures.

== Career ==
In an interview with the Daily Bruin, Etting stated that a broad educational background, particularly in subjects such as literature and writing, has been important to his development as filmmaker and producer. He noted that his studies in English helped him identify source material and develop skills in assembling film projects, including financing, talent acquisition, and assessing international markets.

== Filmography ==
=== Producer / Other ===
Year	Film	Producer	Other	Notes
1996	Public Enemies	No	Yes	Assistant to director
1998	Double Take	No	Yes	Assistant to director
1999	The Base	Yes	No	
1999	Hitman's Run	Yes	No	
2000	Blowback	Yes	Yes	Second unit director
2000	Sacrifice	Yes	Yes	Second unit director
2000	Guilty as Charged	Yes	Yes	Second unit director
2001	Devil's Prey	Yes	No	
2001	Instinct to Kill	Yes	No	
2002	Bad Karma	Yes	No	
2003	Tough Luck	Yes	No	
2005	The Godfather of Green Bay	Yes	No	
2006	Relative Strangers	Yes	No	
2006	Broken	Yes	No	
2008	Technology Jones	Yes	No	
2009	Night Train	Yes	No	
2010	Drunk History	Yes	No	2 episodes
2010–2011	Funny or Die Presents	Yes	No	9 episodes
2011	What's Going On? with Mike Mitchell	Yes	No	
2011	A Good Old Fashioned Orgy	Yes	No	
2014	Reclaim	Yes	Yes	Post-production supervisor
2019	Angel of Mine	Yes	No	

=== Director / Writer ===
Year	Film	Director	Writer	Notes
1998	Interview with the Paparazzi	Yes	No	
2006	Viagra Falls	Yes	Yes	
