= EDtv =

1999 film by Ron Howard

- Theatrical release poster
- Directed by: Ron Howard
- Screenplay by: Lowell Ganz; Babaloo Mandel
- Based on: Louis 19, King of the Airwaves by: Émile Gaudreault; Sylvie Bouchard
- Produced by: Ron Howard; Brian Grazer
- Starring: Matthew McConaughey; Jenna Elfman; Woody Harrelson; Ellen DeGeneres; Sally Kirkland; Martin Landau; Rob Reiner; Dennis Hopper; Elizabeth Hurley; Clint Howard
- Cinematography: John Schwartzman
- Edited by: Mike Hill; Dan Hanley
- Music by: Randy Edelman
- Production company: Imagine Entertainment
- Distributed by: Universal Pictures
- Release date: March 26, 1999
- Running time: 123 minutes
- Country: United States
- Language: English
- Budget: $80 million
- Box office: $35.2 million

EDtv is a 1999 American satirical comedy film directed by Ron Howard. An adaptation of the 1994 Quebecois film Louis 19, King of the Airwaves (Louis 19, le roi des ondes), it stars Matthew McConaughey, Jenna Elfman, Woody Harrelson, Ellen DeGeneres, Martin Landau, Rob Reiner, Sally Kirkland, Elizabeth Hurley, Clint Howard, and Dennis Hopper.

Released by Universal Pictures on March 26, 1999, the film received mixed-to-positive reviews, with some criticizing its similarity to The Truman Show (1998), but was a box office failure, grossing $35.2 million against an $80 million production budget.

== Plot ==
Television network True TV is commencing interviews for a planned reality show that shows a normal person's life 24/7, created by TV producer Cynthia. They interview Ed Pekurny and his brother, Ray. When the producers see the interview, Cynthia chooses Ed. The show hits the airwaves under the title "Ed TV." It is a total failure at first, as only boring things happen. The producers want to pull the plug, but Cynthia remains determined that the show will succeed.

Ed TV gets interesting when Ed visits Ray. Ed (along with the cameramen) discovers that Ray is cheating on his girlfriend Shari. Ed visits Shari to apologize to her for Ray's actions, but a drunk Shari starts insulting Ray, calling him "a bad lay", to the audience's amusement. Ed tries to comfort Shari, revealing he has feelings for her; she reveals she has feelings for him too, and they kiss, making Ed TV extremely popular. At Cynthia's insistence, Ed starts a relationship with Shari, but their relationship is short-lived, as Ed grows more interested in staying on TV and Shari is abused by viewers who find her unappealing.

Ed goes on The Tonight Show with Jay Leno and meets beautiful model and actress Jill who takes a liking to Ed. Ed visits Shari, who tells him she does not want to be with him until Ed TV stops airing. She then leaves town. Ed goes to a park to play football with Ray when Jill arrives to invite Ed over for dinner at her house, as Cynthia brought her in to earn more ratings. When Ed arrives at Jill's house, there is a massive crowd. The two have a small talk, and kiss on top of a table. They are about to have sex, but Ed falls off the table and lands on her cat, which results in a sore back for the former and a broken leg for the latter. Ed never sees Jill again, and he also finds out his brother wrote a book (called My Brother Pissed on Me).

Ed's father Hank, who abandoned his family when Ed was thirteen, unexpectedly visits Ed and informs him that he left because Ed's mother was having an affair with Ed's current stepfather, Al. Ed is furious with his mother Jeanette, who had previously claimed that she had only met Al after Hank left, and argues with her. Ed then gets a phone call telling him to come to the hospital, where he is told his father died having sex with his wife. Ed assumes the father in question is Al, but it is actually Hank, who was having an affair with Jeanette.

After Hank's funeral, Ed becomes disheartened by how the producers want him to stay on longer and that he cannot do anything to change their minds or he would be in breach of his contract. Ed is depressed until he notices a disguised Shari. He chases her to a women's bathroom in a movie theater, where she explains that she is staying with her brother for his birthday and that she just wanted to see Ed. Ed vows to find a way to end the show to be with Shari. When Ed exits, one cameraman stays with Shari, explaining that it is the producers' new idea: Ed's entire family is being filmed, but they will focus on the most interesting person, eliminating his family's right to privacy for as long as the show will air.

Ed gets an idea on how to stop the main producer from airing the show: he will give $10,000 to the person who can give him the best amount of "dirt" on the producers and that he will announce it live, with the desired result being that they stop airing the show before he can make the announcement. As Cynthia feels sorry for Ed, she tells him a secret of the main producer. Ed announces the secret (that the man has to pump a liquid into his penis to get an erection), but before he can announce who it is, the show is taken off the air.

After the camera crew finally leaves Ed's apartment, he and Shari renew their relationship and celebrate as TV news panelists predict Ed will be forgotten in a short period of time.

== Cast ==
- Matthew McConaughey as Edward "Ed" Pekurny
- Jenna Elfman as Shari
- Woody Harrelson as Raymond "Ray" Pekurny
- Ellen DeGeneres as Cynthia Reed
- Martin Landau as Al
- Sally Kirkland as Jeanette Pekurny
- Elizabeth Hurley as Jill
- Rob Reiner as Mr. Whitaker
- Dennis Hopper as Henry "Hank" Pekurny
- Viveka Davis as Marcia Pekurny
- Christian Kane as P.A.
- Adam Goldberg as John
- Wendle Josepher as Rita
- Merrin Dungey as Ms. Seaver
- Ian Gomez as McIlvaine
- Clint Howard as Ken
- RuPaul as himself
- Rick Overton as Barry
- Gedde Watanabe as Greg
- Alexandra Holden as College girl
- Don Most as Benson
- Geoffrey Blake as Keith
- Harry Shearer as Moderator
- Michael Moore, Merrill Markoe, and George Plimpton as Panel members
- Bill Maher as himself
- Jay Leno as himself
- Arianna Huffington as herself

== Soundtrack ==
Music From The Motion Picture EDtv

Soundtrack album by Various Artists
- Released: 1999
- Genres: Rock, Funk
- Length: 56:57
- Label: Reprise Records
- Producers: Brian Grazer, Ron Howard, Bonnie Greenberg

No.	Title	Writer(s)	Performer(s)	Length
1.	"Real Life"	Jon Bon Jovi, Desmond Child	Bon Jovi	3:47
2.	"Thank You (Falletin Me Be Mice Elf Again)"	Sylvester Stewart	Barry White	4:38
3.	"Call and Answer"	Stephen Duffy, Steven Page	Barenaked Ladies	4:07
4.	"Como Ves"	Jesus "Chuy" Perez	Ozomatli	3:58
5.	"Here I Am (Come and Take Me)"	Al Green, Mabon Hodges	Al Green	4:13
6.	"Holly Holy"	Neil Diamond	UB40	3:36
7.	"Careful What You Wish For"	Meredith Brooks, Shelly Peiken, Adam Gorgoni	Meredith Brooks	4:27
8.	"Turnin' Pages"	Taylor Rhodes, Peter Wolf	Peter Wolf	3:39
9.	"Sleep on the Left Side"	Tjinder Singh	Cornershop	4:06
10.	"These Arms of Mine"	Otis Redding	Otis Redding	2:31
11.	"Dirty Water"	Ed Cobb	The Inmates	3:02
12.	"Been Hurt"	Ryan Maxwell	Muzzle	3:01
13.	"Have You Ever"	Joe Tex, Buddy Killen	Joe Tex	3:05
14.	"That's Life"	Dean Kay, Kelly Gordon	James Brown	5:17
15.	"Streetwalkin' Ed"	Randy Edelman	Randy Edelman	3:27
Total length:				56:57

== Release ==
The film was screened out of competition at the 1999 Cannes Film Festival.

== Reception ==
=== Box office ===
EDtv opened in third place behind Forces of Nature and Analyze This, making $8.3 million during its first weekend. The film was a box-office failure, grossing $35.2 million against a production budget of $80 million.

=== Critical response ===
On review aggregator Rotten Tomatoes, EDtv has an approval rating of 64%, based on 47 reviews, with an average rating of 6.3/10. The site's consensus states: "If it's not as ambitious as The Truman Show in satirizing the voyeuristic nature of television, EdTV is an amiable, witty comedy with fine performances from Matthew McConaughey and Woody Harrelson." On Metacritic, the film has a rating of 48 out of 100, based on reviews from 26 critics, indicating "mixed or average" reviews. Audiences polled by CinemaScore gave the film an average grade of "B" on an A+ to F scale.

Ross Anthony of Hollywood Report Card questioned the plausibility of parts of the script but wrote: "Though the thunder of its big idea may have been lost to The Truman Show [...], this screenplay still has real and punchy dialogue. Despite its faults EDtv will engage from beginning till end."

Roger Ebert, Chicago Sun-Times, gave the film 2 and a 1/2 out of 4 stars. Ebert stated that although they share the same idea, The Truman Show is a parable, and EDtv is an ambitious sitcom. Ebert wondered what type of person would sign up for a show like this, and did not believe that Ed is that kind of person, so "the film never quite feels convincing."

Janet Maslin of The New York Times wrote in her review: "In his good-humored, deceptively easygoing satire EdTV, Ron Howard holds up a fun-house mirror to a world ruled by voyeurism and specious fame."

== See also ==
- List of films featuring surveillance
