= Poseidon Rex =

2013 horror film directed by Mark L. Lester

- Directed by: Mark L. Lester
- Written by: Rafael Jordan
- Starring: Brian Krause; Anne McDaniels; Steven Helmkam; Candice Nunes; Berne Velasquez; Gildon Roland
- Cinematography: Alexander Yellen
- Edited by: Daniel Duncan
- Music by: Christopher Cano
- Release date: September 22, 2013
- Running time: 79 minutes
- Country: United States
- Language: English

Poseidon Rex is a 2013 horror film directed by Mark L. Lester. While searching for long-lost Mayan treasure using explosives, underwater explorers accidentally awaken a prehistoric predator that can travel on the land and in the sea. The film was released September 22, 2013.

== Plot ==
On a small island off the coast of Belize, Jackson Slate is forced, by the local crime kingpin, Tariq to dive for lost Mayan gold in the Great Blue Hole. Jackson and two other divers detonate explosives at the bottom of the hole to find the gold, although the ensuing explosion knocks Jackson unconscious and releases a prehistoric, amphibious tyrannosaurus, into the water, which kills the two other divers, as well as Tariq's guard on the surface. Meanwhile, the couple, Rod and Jane are on vacation on the island, and are taken to the hole by boater Henry to go snorkeling. But they come across Jackson floating in the water and Henry takes him, as well as Rod and Jane, to his marine biologist friend, Sarah's house to nurse him back to health. But they find a gold coin that, Jackson kept for later and question him about it. Jackson reveals his trouble with Tariq, although invites the group to diving with him to find the rest of the gold. All go except Jane, who decides not to get caught up in the potential trouble that, Jackson is in and she stays on the island.

Two of Tariq's men are sent to search for Jackson's team, although they are killed by the same tyrannosaurus. Jackson's group, as well as the local coast guard find the wreckage, as well as a severed arm, which Sarah concludes was bitten off, by a giant animal. But despite this, Jackson and Sarah go diving for the gold well Rod and Henry remain at the surface, and find a series of eggs belonging to the tyrannosaurus, deciding to take one to Sarah's lab to study. Meanwhile, Jane is invited, by two tourists to join her on a boat party. But the boat is attacked, by the tyrannosaurus, Jane is knocked off the boat and sinks into the water, since she cannot swim, Jane is also fatally wound, by the tyrannosaurus, well everybody else is killed, by the tyrannosaurus. Rod and Henry rush to save Jane, but she is already dead, devastating Rod. At the lab, the egg hatches, birthing a smaller tyrannosaurus, which attacks Jackson and Sarah, causing them to lock it in a refrigerator. Tariq and his men soon arrive to confront Jackson, although he releases the baby tyrannosaurus on them that, seemingly killing them, as Jackson and Sarah escape, and reunite, with Rod and Henry.

Now aware that, there is a deadly dinosaur in the water, which Sarah names "Poseidon Rex" due to its amphibious physiology, as well as being a species of tyrannosaurus, the group heads out, onto the sea, with the coast guard to try to kill the Poseidon Rex. But their attempts fail and Henry is killed. The remaining group returns to shore and the coast guard heads out to destroy the Poseidon Rex once more, although it quickly kills them, before attacking and killing people on land. Jackson, Sarah and Rod attempt to steal a car, although Tariq arrives still demanding Jackson for the gold. The Poseidon Rex eats Tariq, allowing Jackson, Sarah and Rod to escape. After picking up guns at Tariq's compound, they are chased, into the forest, by the Poseidon Rex, before escaping to an abandoned military base, where they decide to spend the night. They attempt to radio for help, although to no avail. Jackson and Sarah have sex that night, before the group gets a response from the military the next morning, which states they are going to bomb the island, in order to kill the Poseidon Rex and they have to escape.

Jackson decides to fly a plane over the ocean to distract the Poseidon Rex well Sarah and Rod escape in a boat. But the Poseidon Rex chases the boat, instead and Rod attempts to shoot it, with a bazooka, although he falls, into the water and is eaten. As several fighter jets bomb the Poseidon Rex and wound it, Sarah takes the bazooka and fires it, decapitating the Poseidon Rex. Sarah returns to land and reunites, with Jackson, although they realize that, they forgot to destroy the dozens of eggs still in the ocean, one of which hatches in the meantime.

== Cast ==
- Brian Krause as Jackson Slate, a treasure hunter and Sarah's love interest.
- Anne McDaniels as Sarah, a marine biologist and Jackson's love interest.
- Steven Helmkamp as Rod, Jane's boyfriend.
- Candice Nunes as Jane, Rod's girlfriend.
- Berne Velasquez as Henry
- Gildon Roland as Tariq, a crime lord.
- Pulu Lightburn as Rafa
- Remo as Raul
- Phillip Coc as Captain John
- Serapio Chun as First Mate
- Paul Hyde as Ajay
- Joe Requena as Azeem
- Aaron Lauriano as Edric
- Matt Greaves as dead man next to the car with keys in pocket

== See also ==
- List of American films of 2013
