= Relative Strangers =

- Theatrical release poster
- Directed by: Greg Glienna
- Written by: Greg Glienna; Peter Stass
- Produced by: Ram Bergman; Danny DeVito; Brian R. Etting; Josh H. Etting; Lati Grobman
- Starring: Danny DeVito; Kathy Bates; Ron Livingston; Neve Campbell
- Cinematography: Tim Suhrstedt
- Edited by: Jacqueline Cambas
- Music by: David Kitay; Joseph Pullin
- Production companies: Garlin Pictures; Jersey Films
- Distributed by: First Look Studios
- Release date: May 1, 2006 (U.S.)
- Running time: 86 minutes
- Country: United States
- Language: English

Relative Strangers is a 2006 American comedy film directed by Greg Glienna.

== Plot ==
Weeks before his wedding, thirty-four-year-old author and psychologist Richard Clayton's parents reveal to him that he was adopted. He then sets out to find out who his biological parents are, but disaster ensues when it turns out that his parents, Frank and Agnes Menure, are crude, lower class carnies. They follow him home and cause chaos to his normal life.

== Cast ==
- Danny DeVito as Frank Menure
- Kathy Bates as Agnes Menure
- Ron Livingston as Richard Clayton / Menure
- Neve Campbell as Ellen Minnola
- Beverly D'Angelo as Angela Minnola
- Bob Odenkirk as Mitch Clayton
- Edward Herrmann as Doug Clayton
- Christine Baranski as Arleen Clayton
- Martin Mull as Jeffry Morton
- Michael McKean as Ken Hyman
- M. C. Gainey as Spicer
- Star Jones as Holly Davis
- Tracey Walter as Toupee Salesman
- Christa Campbell as Carnival Girl
- Triple H and Dave Bautista appear in cameo roles as professional wrestlers
- Katherine Coening as Patient #1/Patient #2/Patient #3
- Eugenia Perin-Bouwmeester as The Evil Queen
