= BAFTA Award for Best Editing =

British film industry award

- Awarded for: Best Editing
- Location: United Kingdom
- Presented by: British Academy of Film and Television Arts
- Currently held by: Andy Jurgensen for One Battle After Another (2025)
- Website: https://www.bafta.org

The BAFTA Award for Best Editing is a film award presented by the British Academy of Film and Television Arts (BAFTA) at the annual British Academy Film Awards, to recognize a film editor who has delivered outstanding editing in a film.

BAFTA is a British organisation that hosts annual awards shows for film, television, and video games (and formerly also for children's film and television). Since 1966, selected editors have been awarded with the BAFTA award for Best Editing at an annual ceremony. Traditionally, four films were nominated each year until 2000, when the academy expanded the annual number of nominees to five. The predetermined limit was exceeded twice: in 1992, when, due to a tie in the vote, there were five nominees, and in 2008, when there were six nominees.

In the following lists, the titles and names in bold with a gold background are the winners and recipients respectively; those not in bold are the nominees. The years given are those in which the films under consideration were released, not the year of the ceremony, which always takes place the following year.

The film-voting members of the academy select the five nominated films in each category; only the principal editor(s) for each film are named, which excludes additional editors, supervising editors, etc. The actual winner of Best Editing is selected by "Chapter Voting"; only Academy members who are identified as members of the Editing Chapter vote on the winner.

== Winners and nominees ==
indicates the winner

=== 1960s ===
Year	Film	Editor
**1966** (20th)	**Morgan – A Suitable Case for Treatment**	**Tom Priestley**
**1966** (20th)	Alfie	Thelma Connell
**1966** (20th)	Arabesque	Freddie Wilson
**1966** (20th)	The Quiller Memorandum	Freddie Wilson
**1967** (21st)	**Not awarded**	
**1968** (22nd)	**The Graduate**	**Sam O'Steen**
**1968** (22nd)	The Charge of the Light Brigade	Kevin Brownlow
**1968** (22nd)	Oliver!	Ralph Kemplen
**1968** (22nd)	Romeo and Juliet	Reginald Mills
**1969** (23rd)	**Midnight Cowboy**	**Hugh A. Robertson**
**1969** (23rd)	Bullitt	Frank P. Keller
**1969** (23rd)	Oh! What a Lovely War	Kevin Connor
**1969** (23rd)	Z	Françoise Bonnot

=== 1970s ===
Year	Film	Editor
**1970** (24th)	**Butch Cassidy and the Sundance Kid**	**John C. Howard and Richard C. Meyer**
**1970** (24th)	M*A*S*H	Danford B. Greene
**1970** (24th)	Ryan's Daughter	Norman Savage
**1970** (24th)	They Shoot Horses, Don't They?	Fredric Steinkamp
**1971** (25th)	**Sunday Bloody Sunday**	**Richard Marden**
**1971** (25th)	Fiddler on the Roof	Antony Gibbs and Robert Lawrence
**1971** (25th)	Performance	Antony Gibbs
**1971** (25th)	Taking Off	John Carter
**1972** (26th)	**The French Connection**	**Gerald B. Greenberg**
**1972** (26th)	Cabaret	David Bretherton
**1972** (26th)	A Clockwork Orange	Bill Butler
**1972** (26th)	Deliverance	Tom Priestley
**1973** (27th)	**The Day of the Jackal**	**Ralph Kemplen**
**1973** (27th)	Charley Varrick	Frank Morriss
**1973** (27th)	Don't Look Now	Graeme Clifford
**1973** (27th)	The National Health	Ralph Sheldon
**1974** (28th)	**The Conversation**	**Richard Chew and Walter Murch**
**1974** (28th)	Chinatown	Sam O'Steen
**1974** (28th)	Murder on the Orient Express	Anne V. Coates
**1974** (28th)	The Three Musketeers	John Victor Smith
**1975** (29th)	**Dog Day Afternoon**	**Dede Allen**
**1975** (29th)	The Godfather Part II	Peter Zinner, Barry Malkin and Richard Marks
**1975** (29th)	Jaws	Verna Fields
**1975** (29th)	Rollerball	Antony Gibbs
**1976** (30th)	**One Flew Over the Cuckoo's Nest**	**Richard Chew, Lynzee Klingman and Sheldon Kahn**
**1976** (30th)	All the President's Men	Robert L. Wolfe
**1976** (30th)	Marathon Man	Jim Clark
**1976** (30th)	Taxi Driver	Marcia Lucas, Tom Rolf and Melvin Shapiro
**1977** (31st)	**Annie Hall**	**Ralph Rosenblum and Wendy Greene Bricmont**
**1977** (31st)	A Bridge Too Far	Antony Gibbs
**1977** (31st)	Network	Alan Heim
**1977** (31st)	Rocky	Richard Halsey
**1978** (32nd)	**Midnight Express**	**Gerry Hambling**
**1978** (32nd)	Close Encounters of the Third Kind	Michael Kahn
**1978** (32nd)	Julia	Walter Murch
**1978** (32nd)	Star Wars	Paul Hirsch, Marcia Lucas and Richard Chew
**1979** (33rd)	**The Deer Hunter**	**Peter Zinner**
**1979** (33rd)	Alien	Terry Rawlings
**1979** (33rd)	Apocalypse Now	Richard Marks, Walter Murch, Gerald B. Greenberg and Lisa Fruchtman
**1979** (33rd)	Manhattan	Susan E. Morse

=== 1980s ===
Year	Film	Editor
**1980** (34th)	**All That Jazz**	**Alan Heim**
**1980** (34th)	The Elephant Man	Anne V. Coates
**1980** (34th)	Fame	Gerry Hambling
**1980** (34th)	Kramer vs. Kramer	Gerald B. Greenberg
**1981** (35th)	**Raging Bull**	**Thelma Schoonmaker**
**1981** (35th)	Chariots of Fire	Terry Rawlings
**1981** (35th)	The French Lieutenant's Woman	John Bloom
**1981** (35th)	Raiders of the Lost Ark	Michael Kahn
**1982** (36th)	**Missing**	**Françoise Bonnot**
**1982** (36th)	Blade Runner	Terry Rawlings
**1982** (36th)	E.T. the Extra-Terrestrial	Carol Littleton
**1982** (36th)	Gandhi	John Bloom
**1983** (37th)	**Flashdance**	**Walt Mulconery and Bud S. Smith**
**1983** (37th)	The King of Comedy	Thelma Schoonmaker
**1983** (37th)	Local Hero	Michael Bradsell
**1983** (37th)	Zelig	Susan E. Morse
**1984** (38th)	**The Killing Fields**	**Jim Clark**
**1984** (38th)	Another Country	Gerry Hambling
**1984** (38th)	Indiana Jones and the Temple of Doom	Michael Kahn
**1984** (38th)	Under Fire	John Bloom and Mark Conte
**1985** (39th)	**Amadeus**	**Michael A. Chandler and Nena Danevic**
**1985** (39th)	Back to the Future	Arthur Schmidt and Harry Keramidas
**1985** (39th)	A Chorus Line	John Bloom
**1985** (39th)	Witness	Thom Noble
**1986** (40th)	**The Mission**	**Jim Clark**
**1986** (40th)	Hannah and Her Sisters	Susan E. Morse
**1986** (40th)	Mona Lisa	Lesley Walker
**1986** (40th)	A Room with a View	Humphrey Dixon
**1987** (41st)	**Platoon**	**Claire Simpson**
**1987** (41st)	Cry Freedom	Lesley Walker
**1987** (41st)	Hope and Glory	Ian Crafford
**1987** (41st)	Radio Days	Susan E. Morse
**1988** (42nd)	**Fatal Attraction**	**Peter E. Berger and Michael Kahn**
**1988** (42nd)	A Fish Called Wanda	John Jympson
**1988** (42nd)	The Last Emperor	Gabriella Cristiani
**1988** (42nd)	Who Framed Roger Rabbit	Arthur Schmidt
**1989** (43rd)	**Mississippi Burning**	**Gerry Hambling**
**1989** (43rd)	Dangerous Liaisons	Mick Audsley
**1989** (43rd)	Dead Poets Society	William M. Anderson
**1989** (43rd)	Rain Man	Stu Linder

=== 1990s ===
Year	Film	Editor
**1990** (44th)	**Goodfellas**	**Thelma Schoonmaker**
**1990** (44th)	Cinema Paradiso	Mario Morra
**1990** (44th)	Crimes and Misdemeanors	Susan E. Morse
**1990** (44th)	Dick Tracy	Richard Marks
**1991** (45th)	**The Commitments**	**Gerry Hambling**
**1991** (45th)	Dances with Wolves	Neil Travis
**1991** (45th)	The Silence of the Lambs	Craig McKay
**1991** (45th)	Thelma & Louise	Thom Noble
**1992** (46th)	**JFK**	**Joe Hutshing and Pietro Scalia**
**1992** (46th)	Cape Fear	Thelma Schoonmaker
**1992** (46th)	Howards End	Andrew Marcus
**1992** (46th)	The Player	Geraldine Peroni
**1992** (46th)	Strictly Ballroom	Jill Bilcock
**1993** (47th)	**Schindler's List**	**Michael Kahn**
**1993** (47th)	The Fugitive	Dennis Virkler, David Finfer, Dean Goodhill, Don Brochu, Richard Nord and Dov Hoenig
**1993** (47th)	In the Line of Fire	Anne V. Coates
**1993** (47th)	The Piano	Veronika Jenet
**1994** (48th)	**Speed**	**John Wright**
**1994** (48th)	Forrest Gump	Arthur Schmidt
**1994** (48th)	Four Weddings and a Funeral	Jon Gregory
**1994** (48th)	Pulp Fiction	Sally Menke
**1995** (49th)	**The Usual Suspects**	**John Ottman**
**1995** (49th)	Apollo 13	Mike Hill and Daniel P. Hanley
**1995** (49th)	Babe	Marcus D'Arcy and Jay Friedkin
**1995** (49th)	The Madness of King George	Tariq Anwar
**1996** (50th)	**The English Patient**	**Walter Murch**
**1996** (50th)	Evita	Gerry Hambling
**1996** (50th)	Fargo	Roderick Jaynes
**1996** (50th)	Shine	Pip Karmel
**1997** (51st)	**L.A. Confidential**	**Peter Honess**
**1997** (51st)	The Full Monty	Nick Moore and David Freeman
**1997** (51st)	Romeo + Juliet	Jill Bilcock
**1997** (51st)	Titanic	Conrad Buff IV, James Cameron and Richard A. Harris
**1998** (52nd)	**Shakespeare in Love**	**David Gamble**
**1998** (52nd)	Elizabeth	Jill Bilcock
**1998** (52nd)	Lock, Stock and Two Smoking Barrels	Niven Howie
**1998** (52nd)	Saving Private Ryan	Michael Kahn
**1999** (53rd)	**American Beauty**	**Tariq Anwar and Christopher Greenbury**
**1999** (53rd)	Being John Malkovich	Eric Zumbrunnen
**1999** (53rd)	The Matrix	Zach Staenberg
**1999** (53rd)	The Sixth Sense	Andrew Mondshein

=== 2000s ===
Year	Film	Editor
**2000** (54th)	**Gladiator**	**Pietro Scalia**
**2000** (54th)	Billy Elliot	John Wilson
**2000** (54th)	Crouching Tiger, Hidden Dragon	Tim Squyres
**2000** (54th)	Erin Brockovich	Anne V. Coates
**2000** (54th)	Traffic	Stephen Mirrione
**2001** (55th)	**Mulholland Drive**	**Mary Sweeney**
**2001** (55th)	Amélie	Hervé Schneid
**2001** (55th)	Black Hawk Down	Pietro Scalia
**2001** (55th)	The Lord of the Rings: The Fellowship of the Ring	John Gilbert
**2001** (55th)	Moulin Rouge!	Jill Bilcock
**2002** (56th)	**City of God**	**Daniel Rezende**
**2002** (56th)	Chicago	Martin Walsh
**2002** (56th)	Gangs of New York	Thelma Schoonmaker
**2002** (56th)	The Hours	Peter Boyle
**2002** (56th)	The Lord of the Rings: The Two Towers	Michael J. Horton
**2003** (57th)	**Lost in Translation**	**Sarah Flack**
**2003** (57th)	21 Grams	Stephen Mirrione
**2003** (57th)	Cold Mountain	Walter Murch
**2003** (57th)	Kill Bill: Volume 1	Sally Menke
**2003** (57th)	The Lord of the Rings: The Return of the King	Jamie Selkirk
**2004** (58th)	**Eternal Sunshine of the Spotless Mind**	**Valdís Óskarsdóttir**
**2004** (58th)	The Aviator	Thelma Schoonmaker
**2004** (58th)	Collateral	Jim Miller and Paul Rubell
**2004** (58th)	House of Flying Daggers	Long Cheng
**2004** (58th)	Vera Drake	Jim Clark
**2005** (59th)	**The Constant Gardener**	**Claire Simpson**
**2005** (59th)	Brokeback Mountain	Geraldine Peroni and Dylan Tichenor
**2005** (59th)	Crash	Hughes Winborne
**2005** (59th)	Good Night and Good Luck	Stephen Mirrione
**2005** (59th)	March of the Penguins	Sabine Emiliani
**2006** (60th)	**United 93**	**Clare Douglas, Richard Pearson and Christopher Rouse**
**2006** (60th)	Babel	Stephen Mirrione and Douglas Crise
**2006** (60th)	Casino Royale	Stuart Baird
**2006** (60th)	The Departed	Thelma Schoonmaker
**2006** (60th)	The Queen	Lucia Zucchetti
**2007** (61st)	**The Bourne Ultimatum**	**Christopher Rouse**
**2007** (61st)	American Gangster	Pietro Scalia
**2007** (61st)	Atonement	Paul Tothill
**2007** (61st)	Michael Clayton	John Gilroy
**2007** (61st)	No Country for Old Men	Roderick Jaynes
**2008** (62nd)	**Slumdog Millionaire**	**Chris Dickens**
**2008** (62nd)	Changeling	Joel Cox and Gary D. Roach
**2008** (62nd)	The Curious Case of Benjamin Button	Kirk Baxter and Angus Wall
**2008** (62nd)	The Dark Knight	Lee Smith
**2008** (62nd)	Frost/Nixon	Daniel P. Hanley and Mike Hill
**2008** (62nd)	In Bruges	Jon Gregory
**2009** (63rd)	**The Hurt Locker**	**Chris Innis and Bob Murawski**
**2009** (63rd)	Avatar	James Cameron, John Refoua and Stephen E. Rivkin
**2009** (63rd)	District 9	Julian Clarke
**2009** (63rd)	Inglourious Basterds	Sally Menke
**2009** (63rd)	Up in the Air	Dana E. Glauberman

=== 2010s ===
Year	Film	Editor
**2010** (64th)	**The Social Network**	**Kirk Baxter and Angus Wall**
**2010** (64th)	127 Hours	Jon Harris
**2010** (64th)	Black Swan	Andrew Weisblum
**2010** (64th)	Inception	Lee Smith
**2010** (64th)	The King's Speech	Tariq Anwar
**2011** (65th)	**Senna**	**Chris King and Gregers Sall**
**2011** (65th)	The Artist	Anne-Sophie Bion and Michel Hazanavicius
**2011** (65th)	Drive	Mat Newman
**2011** (65th)	Hugo	Thelma Schoonmaker
**2011** (65th)	Tinker Tailor Soldier Spy	Dino Jonsäter
**2012** (66th)	**Argo**	**William Goldenberg**
**2012** (66th)	Django Unchained	Fred Raskin
**2012** (66th)	Life of Pi	Tim Squyres
**2012** (66th)	Skyfall	Stuart Baird
**2012** (66th)	Zero Dark Thirty	Dylan Tichenor and William Goldenberg
**2013** (67th)	**Rush**	**Daniel P. Hanley and Mike Hill**
**2013** (67th)	12 Years a Slave	Joe Walker
**2013** (67th)	Captain Phillips	Christopher Rouse
**2013** (67th)	Gravity	Alfonso Cuarón and Mark Sanger
**2013** (67th)	The Wolf of Wall Street	Thelma Schoonmaker
**2014** (68th)	**Whiplash**	**Tom Cross**
**2014** (68th)	Birdman	Douglas Crise and Stephen Mirrione
**2014** (68th)	The Grand Budapest Hotel	Barney Pilling
**2014** (68th)	The Imitation Game	William Goldenberg
**2014** (68th)	Nightcrawler	John Gilroy
**2014** (68th)	The Theory of Everything	Jinx Godfrey
**2015** (69th)	**Mad Max: Fury Road**	**Margaret Sixel**
**2015** (69th)	The Big Short	Hank Corwin
**2015** (69th)	Bridge of Spies	Michael Kahn
**2015** (69th)	The Martian	Pietro Scalia
**2015** (69th)	The Revenant	Stephen Mirrione
**2016** (70th)	**Hacksaw Ridge**	**John Gilbert**
**2016** (70th)	Arrival	Joe Walker
**2016** (70th)	La La Land	Tom Cross
**2016** (70th)	Manchester by the Sea	Jennifer Lame
**2016** (70th)	Nocturnal Animals	Joan Sobel
**2017** (71st)	**Baby Driver**	**Paul Machliss and Jonathan Amos**
**2017** (71st)	Blade Runner 2049	Joe Walker
**2017** (71st)	Dunkirk	Lee Smith
**2017** (71st)	The Shape of Water	Sidney Wolinsky
**2017** (71st)	Three Billboards Outside Ebbing, Missouri	Jon Gregory
**2018** (72nd)	**Vice**	**Hank Corwin**
**2018** (72nd)	Bohemian Rhapsody	John Ottman
**2018** (72nd)	The Favourite	Yorgos Mavropsaridis
**2018** (72nd)	First Man	Tom Cross
**2018** (72nd)	Roma	Alfonso Cuarón and Adam Gough
**2019** (73rd)	**Ford v Ferrari**	**Andrew Buckland and Michael McCusker**
**2019** (73rd)	The Irishman	Thelma Schoonmaker
**2019** (73rd)	Jojo Rabbit	Tom Eagles
**2019** (73rd)	Joker	Jeff Groth
**2019** (73rd)	Once Upon a Time in Hollywood	Fred Raskin

=== 2020s ===
Year	Film	Editor
**2020** (74th)	**Sound of Metal**	**Mikkel E. G. Nielsen**
**2020** (74th)	The Father	Yorgos Lamprinos
**2020** (74th)	Nomadland	Chloé Zhao
**2020** (74th)	Promising Young Woman	Frédéric Thoraval
**2020** (74th)	The Trial of the Chicago 7	Alan Baumgarten
**2021** (75th)	**No Time to Die**	**Tom Cross and Elliot Graham**
**2021** (75th)	Belfast	Úna Ní Dhonghaíle
**2021** (75th)	Dune	Joe Walker
**2021** (75th)	Licorice Pizza	Andy Jurgensen
**2021** (75th)	Summer of Soul	Joshua L. Pearson
**2022** (76th)	**Everything Everywhere All at Once**	**Paul Rogers**
**2022** (76th)	All Quiet on the Western Front	Sven Budelmann
**2022** (76th)	The Banshees of Inisherin	Mikkel E. G. Nielsen
**2022** (76th)	Elvis	Jonathan Redmond and Matt Villa
**2022** (76th)	Top Gun: Maverick	Eddie Hamilton
**2023** (77th)	**Oppenheimer**	**Jennifer Lame**
**2023** (77th)	Anatomy of a Fall	Laurent Sénéchal
**2023** (77th)	Killers of the Flower Moon	Thelma Schoonmaker
**2023** (77th)	Poor Things	Yorgos Mavropsaridis
**2023** (77th)	The Zone of Interest	Paul Watts
**2024** (78th)	**Conclave**	**Nick Emerson**
**2024** (78th)	Anora	Sean Baker
**2024** (78th)	Dune: Part Two	Joe Walker
**2024** (78th)	Emilia Pérez	Juliette Welfling
**2024** (78th)	Kneecap	Julian Ulrichs and Chris Gill
**2025** (79th)	**One Battle After Another**	**Andy Jurgensen**
**2025** (79th)	F1	Stephen Mirrione
**2025** (79th)	A House of Dynamite	Kirk Baxter
**2025** (79th)	Marty Supreme	Ronald Bronstein and Josh Safdie
**2025** (79th)	Sinners	Michael P. Shawver

== Multiple wins and nominations ==
=== Multiple nominations ===
11 nominations

- Thelma Schoonmaker

7 nominations

- Michael Kahn
- Stephen Mirrione

6 nominations

- Gerry Hambling

5 nominations

- Susan E. Morse
- Walter Murch
- Pietro Scalia
- Joe Walker

4 nominations

- Kirk Baxter
- Jill Bilcock
- John Bloom
- Jim Clark
- Anne V. Coates
- Tom Cross
- Antony Gibbs

3 nominations

- Tariq Anwar
- Richard Chew
- William Goldenberg
- Gerald B. Greenberg
- Daniel P. Hanley
- Mike Hill
- Jon Gregory
- Richard Marks
- Sally Menke
- Terry Rawlings
- Christopher Rouse
- Arthur Schmidt
- Lee Smith

2 nominations

- Stuart Baird
- Françoise Bonnot
- James Cameron
- Hank Corwin
- Douglas Crise
- Alfonso Cuarón
- John Gilbert
- John Gilroy

- Alan Heim
- Roderick Jaynes
- Andy Jurgensen
- Ralph Kemplen
- Jennifer Lame
- Marcia Lucas
- Yorgos Mavropsaridis
- Mikkel E. G. Nielsen
- Thom Noble
- Sam O'Steen
- John Ottman
- Geraldine Peroni
- Tom Priestley
- Fred Raskin
- Claire Simpson
- Tim Squyres
- Dylan Tichenor
- Lesley Walker
- Angus Wall
- Freddie Wilson
- Peter Zinner

=== Multiple wins ===
3 wins

- Gerry Hambling

2 wins

- Richard Chew
- Jim Clark
- Tom Cross
- Michael Kahn
- Walter Murch
- Christopher Rouse
- Pietro Scalia
- Thelma Schoonmaker
- Claire Simpson

== See also ==
- AACTA Award for Best Editing
- Academy Award for Best Film Editing
- American Cinema Editors Award for Best Edited Feature Film – Comedy or Musical
- American Cinema Editors Award for Best Edited Feature Film – Dramatic
- Critics' Choice Movie Award for Best Editing
- Independent Spirit Award for Best Editing
