= The Last Ride (novel) =

1995 novel by Thomas Eidson

- Author: Thomas Eidson
- Language: English
- Publication date: 1995

The Last Ride is a western novel by Thomas Eidson, first published in 1995. It is the sequel to St. Agnes' Stand (1994) and is followed by All God's Children (1998).

The plot concerns an aging shaman who tries to reconcile with his estranged daughter in New Mexico. When his granddaughter is kidnapped by renegade Apaches, the two must work together to get her back.

A film adaptation of the novel entitled The Missing was released in 2003. The film was directed by Ron Howard and stars Tommy Lee Jones and Cate Blanchett.

== Editions ==
- ISBN 0-399-14057-3, Putnam Group, 1995
- ISBN 1-56895-241-4, Wheeler Publishing, 1995 (large print)
- ISBN 0-515-11741-2, Jove Publishing, 1995 (paperback)
- ISBN 0-7089-3663-6, Ulverscroft, 1997 (large print, out of print)
- ISBN 0-00-718135-3, HarperCollins, 2004 (paperback)

Reissued as The Missing after the 2003 film adaptation:

- ISBN 0-8129-7238-4, Random House Trade Paperbacks, 2003
- ISBN 0-00-718173-6, HarperCollins, 2003 (with film image cover)
