= Armed and Dangerous (1986 film) =

1986 film by Mark L. Lester

- Theatrical release poster
- Directed by: Mark L. Lester
- Screenplay by: Harold Ramis; Peter Torokvei
- Story by: Brian Grazer; Harold Ramis; James Keach
- Produced by: Brian Grazer; James Keach
- Starring: John Candy; Eugene Levy; Robert Loggia; Kenneth McMillan; Meg Ryan
- Cinematography: Fred Schuler
- Edited by: Daniel P. Hanley; Mike Hill; Gregory Prange
- Music by: Bill Meyers
- Distributed by: Columbia Pictures
- Release date: August 15, 1986
- Running time: 88 minutes
- Country: United States
- Language: English
- Budget: $12.5 million
- Box office: $15.9 million

Armed and Dangerous is a 1986 American action comedy film directed by Mark L. Lester and starring John Candy, Eugene Levy, Robert Loggia and Meg Ryan. The plot revolves around two security guards who uncover a criminal conspiracy at the warehouse they are assigned to protect. It was filmed on location in and around Los Angeles, California. Released on August 15, 1986, the film received negative reviews from critics and grossed $15 million against its $12.5 million budget.

== Plot ==
Los Angeles police officer Frank Dooley is framed for stealing a television set by corrupt detectives Rizzo and Nedler and dismissed from the force. Meanwhile, hapless defense attorney Norman Kane is threatened with death by his latest client if he fails to keep him out of prison. Kane reveals his ineptitude and the death threat to the judge, who agrees to render a long sentence if Kane resigns as a lawyer.

Dooley and Kane meet when they apply for work at Guard Dog Security, run by Captain Clarence O'Connell and part of a union represented by Klepper and Lazarus. Becoming licensed security guards after a single afternoon of training, Dooley and Kane are made partners by supervisor Maggie Cavanaugh and assigned to night duty at a pharmaceutical warehouse. Ordered to take a lunch break by senior guard Bruno, Kane happens upon an armed robbery of the warehouse and calls Frank for help, but they prove no match for the thieves.

The next day, the pair are berated by O'Connell for their failure. While they are venting their anger toward O'Connell, Maggie reveals that she is his daughter. Dooley and Kane then attend a meeting of the union, where Kane's attempt to file a grievance against Guard Dog is quashed by union president Michael Carlino. Kane pointedly questions Carlino about how the union dues, adding to about $4 million per year, are spent. After Kane rejects an evasive answer from treasurer Lou Brackman, Carlino threatens Kane if he attends another union meeting.

Over the next few days, Dooley and Kane find themselves assigned to work at a landfill and a toxic waste dump. Convinced that something illegal is afoot after hearing a story from two fellow security guards about a similar robbery, the pair track down Bruno at his gym and interrogate him. Bruno admits that Carlino had him order them to lunch the night of the robbery. They visit an informant friend of Dooley's for information on Carlino and bring their suspicions to Maggie, but she rejects them for having no evidence.

Dooley and Kane next attend a party thrown by Carlino, hoping to gather some evidence. Eavesdropping on a meeting between Carlino and Brackman, they learn that Carlino is using the pension fund to finance dealings with a drug cartel and plans to have the money robbed from an armored car, with insurance covering the loss. Fearing that the insurance company will investigate, Brackman urges Carlino not to execute the robbery. Carlino instructs Klepper and Lazarus to kill Brackman. Dooley and Kane attempt to save Brackman, but are too late to prevent his murder. After a night spent evading the police, the two make plans with Maggie to prevent the armored car robbery. Kane and Maggie take over driving the truck, while Dooley plans to meet them ahead of the would-be robbers.

Dooley has problems with his motorcycle while weaving through a traffic jam on L.A.'s Sixth Street Viaduct and is forced to hitch a ride with a trucker who bulldozes his way through the traffic, destroying several cars in the process. Meanwhile, Kane and Maggie avoid assaults from multiple cars attempting to hold them up. Dooley arrives in time to save the armored car from a final all-out attack from Klepper and Lazarus. O'Connell arrives, having captured Carlino and his associates, Rizzo and Nedler.

The criminals are arrested and Dooley is invited back to the police force, along with a reluctant Kane.

== Cast ==
- John Candy as Frank Dooley
- Eugene Levy as Norman Kane
- Robert Loggia as Michael Carlino
- Kenneth McMillan as Captain Clarence O'Connell
- Meg Ryan as Maggie Cavanaugh
- Brion James as Anthony Lazarus
- Jonathan Banks as Clyde Klepper
- Don Stroud as Sergeant Rizzo
- Larry Hankin as Kokolovitch
- Steve Railsback as "The Cowboy"
- Tony Burton as Cappy
- Larry "Flash" Jenkins as Raisin
- Stacy Keach, Sr. as Judge
- Saveliy Kramarov as Olaf
- Tommy "Tiny" Lister as Bruno (billed as Tom "Tiny" Lester, Jr.)
- James Tolkan as Lou Brackman
- Glenn Withrow as Larry Lupik
- David Wohl as Prosecutor
- Teagan Clive as Staff Member
- Tito Puente as Band Leader
- David Hess as Gunman #4
- Judy Landers as Noreen
- Bruce Kirby as Police Captain

== Production ==
The project was initially developed by Harold Ramis as a vehicle for Dan Aykroyd and John Belushi. According to John Candy, John Carpenter was initially attached to direct. Carpenter stated that he dropped out of the project after Aykroyd stipulated that he would not star in the film unless the script was changed to culminate with a car chase.

Ramis said the film "had died a quiet death, and then was resurrected by Brian Grazer, the producer. And Brian said, 'If I can find a director, can I make the movie?' And I said okay." Candy and Tom Hanks were cast, but Hanks dropped out, and Candy recommended Eugene Levy, his costar in Second City Television and Going Berserk (1983), to replace Hanks. Filming began in March 1986 around Los Angeles and lasted 12 weeks, including shutting down the Sixth Street Bridge for two days.

Ramis said the film "was not good. I tried to take my name off it. I took my name off in one place", referring to his executive producer credit, which was removed prior to release. Ramis is still credited as a screenwriter, despite his objections.

== Release and reception ==
The film opened in the United States on August 15, 1986. It debuted to $4.3 million, finishing second behind fellow new release The Fly. In its second weekend it made $2.6 million, dropping to seventh place.

On Rotten Tomatoes the film holds an approval rating of 9% based on 11 reviews, with an average rating of 3.1/10. Metacritic, which uses a weighted average, assigned the film a score of 17 out of 100, based on seven critics, indicating "overwhelming dislike". Audiences polled by CinemaScore gave the film an average grade of "B–" on an A+ to F scale.

Reflecting on the film in 2014, director Mark Lester said, "The movie came out okay, but I wasn't used to working with comedians. I was trying to tell the story and put in some good action scenes, but they didn't care about any of that. They just wanted to be funny."
