= Hunt–Lauda rivalry =

Formula One rivalry

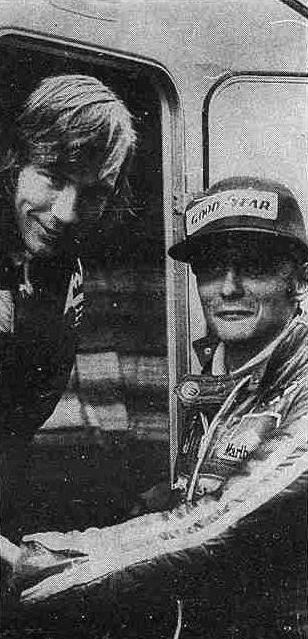
James Hunt (left) and Niki Lauda (right) at Autodromo Nazionale Monza in 1976.

The Hunt–Lauda rivalry or Lauda–Hunt rivalry was a Formula 1 rivalry between British racing driver James Hunt and Austrian racing driver Niki Lauda that ran from the 1973 season until Hunt's retirement after the 1979 season.

Widely regarded as one of the most significant rivalries in Formula 1, the Lauda–Hunt rivalry is often compared to the later Prost–Senna rivalry for its impact on the sport and the rivals' contrasting personalities and driving styles.

Lauda, known for his meticulous and analytical approach, won the World Championship in 1975 and 1977 driving for Ferrari, notably in the Ferrari 312T. Hunt, nicknamed "The Shunt" for his aggressive driving style and charismatic persona, secured the 1976 World Drivers' Championship in the McLaren M23.

Their rivalry peaked in the 1976 Formula 1 season after Lauda's near-fatal crash at the Nürburgring, during which he suffered severe burns and inhaled toxic fumes. Just six weeks after the accident, he made an astonishing comeback at the Italian Grand Prix, returning to the track with visible scars and a respirator and finishing fourth.

While they were fierce competitors on the track, Hunt readily admitted that the two were good friends from their early days "gypsy[ing] around Europe together" in Formula Three, where they became "mates, not just casual acquaintances." The enduring friendship between the two continued until Hunt's death in 1993.

The 2013 biographical sports film Rush depicted their rivalry as more intense and occasionally nasty than it actually was, although it ended with a warm moment and Lauda's voiceover that Hunt was "among the very few I liked, and even fewer I respected."

== Formula One World Championship ==
Driver	Entries	Championships	Wins	Pole positions	Fastest laps	Career points
(Austria) Niki Lauda	177	3	25	24	24	420.5
(United Kingdom) James Hunt	93	1	10	14	8	179

=== Head-to-head results ===
Driver	Championship position							Wins	Podiums	Championships
Driver	1973	1974	1975	1976	1977	1978	1979	Wins	Podiums	Championships
(Austria) Niki Lauda	18th BRM	4th Ferrari	1st Ferrari	2nd Ferrari	1st Ferrari	4th Brabham	14th Brabham	16	39	2
(United Kingdom) James Hunt	8th Hesketh	8th Hesketh	4th Hesketh	1st McLaren	5th McLaren	13th McLaren	NC; Wolf	10	23	1

== See also ==
- List of sports rivalries
- Formula One rivalries
- Rush (film)
