= Misbegotten =

- Directed by: Mark L. Lester
- Written by: Larry Cohen
- Based on: Misbegotten by James Gabriel Berman
- Starring: Kevin Dillon; Nick Mancuso; Lysette Anthony
- Cinematography: Mark Irwin
- Edited by: David Berlatsky
- Music by: Paul Zaza
- Production companies: Cinépix Film Properties; American World Pictures
- Distributed by: Cinépix Film Properties; Trimark Home Video
- Release date: June 1, 1998
- Running time: 95 minutes
- Country: United States
- Language: English

Misbegotten is a 1997 film directed by Mark L. Lester. It's one of Lester's favourite films in part because he admired the writing of Larry Cohen.

== Plot summary ==
A killer who is obsessed with fathering a child, but has troubles with relationships with women, becomes a father via artificial insemination. He then tracks the mother down and terrorizes her and her husband.

== Cast ==
- Kevin Dillon as Billy Crapshoot
- Nick Mancuso as Paul Bourke
- Lysette Anthony as Caitlan Bourke
- Mark Holden as Captain

== Production ==
Filming occurred during mid-1997 in Britannia Beach, British Columbia.

== Rating ==
The film was rated R when released.

== Reception ==
The film received generally poor reviews, with TVguide.com giving it only one and a half stars.
