= Thomas Eidson =

American author

- Born: 1944 (age 81–82)
- Occupation: Novelist
- Writing career
- Genres: Fiction, Western fiction

Thomas Eidson (born 1944) is an American author best known for his writing of The Last Ride, which was turned into a film directed by Ron Howard titled The Missing in 2003. It was filmed entirely in Santa Fe, New Mexico where the novel is set.

== Life ==
Thomas Eidson started out as a newspaper reporter in California and has been writing since high school, from a teleplay entitled The Miracle to profiles and features for hotel publications and airline in-flight magazines. His four books are set in the 19th century Old West. The passion for this historical era stems in part from deep family roots in Kansas, where his grandfather owned and ran a cattle ranch.

For his day job he works in public relations at Fidelity Investments in Boston.

== Works ==
=== Novels ===
- St. Agnes' Stand series:
  1. St. Agnes' Stand (1994)
  2. The Last Ride (1995); retitled The Missing (2003); Desaparecidas (2004) Portuguese version of The Missing
  3. All God's Children (1996)
- Hannah's Gift (1998)
- In This House (2005)
- Souls of Angels (2007)
