= Blowback (film) =

2000 film directed by Mark L. Lester

- Directed by: Mark L. Lester
- Written by: Jeffrey Goldenberg; Bob Held; Randall Frakes
- Produced by: Mark L. Lester; Dana Dubovsky; Brian R. Etting
- Starring: Mario Van Peebles; James Remar
- Cinematography: Jacques Haitkin
- Edited by: Christopher Roth
- Music by: Sean Callery
- Distributed by: Lionsgate
- Release date: 2000
- Running time: 91 min.
- Country: United States
- Language: English

Blowback is a 2000 American thriller film directed by Mark L. Lester and starring Mario Van Peebles and James Remar.

== Premise ==
The film follows detective Morrell (Van Peebles) as he investigates whether a series of murders identical to those committed by Wittman (Remar) years ago were committed by a copycat or if they were committed by Wittman himself.

== Cast ==
- Mario Van Peebles as Inspector Don Morrell
- James Remar as John Wittman
- Sharisse Baker as Det. Sgt. Monica Ricci
- David Groh as Capt. Barnett
- Stephen Caffrey as Agent Norwood

== Production ==
Filming took place in San Diego, California.
