= Rush (2013 film) =

2013 biographical sports film directed by Ron Howard

- British release poster
- Directed by: Ron Howard
- Written by: Peter Morgan
- Produced by: Andrew Eaton; Eric Fellner; Brian Oliver; Peter Morgan; Brian Grazer; Ron Howard
- Starring: Chris Hemsworth; Daniel Brühl; Olivia Wilde; Alexandra Maria Lara; Pierfrancesco Favino
- Cinematography: Anthony Dod Mantle
- Edited by: Daniel Hanley; Mike Hill
- Music by: Hans Zimmer
- Production companies: Cross Creek Pictures; Exclusive Media; Working Title Films; Imagine Entertainment; Revolution Films; Egoli Tossell Film
- Distributed by: Universal Pictures (United States); StudioCanal (United Kingdom); Universum Film Buena Vista International (Germany); Exclusive Media (Overseas)
- Release dates: 2 September 2013 (London); 13 September 2013 (United Kingdom); 20 September 2013 (United States); 3 October 2013 (Germany)
- Running time: 123 minutes
- Countries: United Kingdom; Germany; United States (Note: There is some disagreement regarding the country of origin of Rush and this is a weighted listing of the sources. Andrew Eaton, one of the film's producers, calls it a British film, but also indicates it is an "Anglo-German co-production," while another source lists only Germany. Another source lists both Great Britain and the US, while others list all three countries.)
- Languages: English; Austrian German
- Budget: $38 million
- Box office: $98.2 million

Rush is a 2013 biographical sports film directed by Ron Howard and written by Peter Morgan. It is centred on the rivalry between two Formula One drivers, James Hunt and Niki Lauda, during the 1976 Formula One season. The film stars Chris Hemsworth as Hunt and Daniel Brühl as Lauda.

The film premiered in London on 2 September 2013 and was shown at the 2013 Toronto International Film Festival before its United Kingdom release on 13 September 2013. The film received positive reviews from critics for Hemsworth and Brühl's performances, Howard's direction, the racing sequences, and Hans Zimmer's musical score.

== Plot ==
James Hunt and Niki Lauda, two Formula One drivers with contrasting personalities and racing approaches, develop a rivalry after competing in a Formula Three event in London in 1970, where both cars spin before Hunt wins the race. Lauda later obtains a bank loan from Austria's Raiffeisen Bank to finance his entry into the BRM Formula One team, where he becomes teammates with Clay Regazzoni .

Meanwhile, Hesketh Racing, the fledgling racing team Hunt drives for, enters Formula One. Lauda then joins Scuderia Ferrari with Regazzoni and wins his first championship in 1975. Lacking a sponsor, Hesketh closes, so Hunt joins McLaren. He also marries supermodel Suzy Miller, while Lauda develops a relationship with socialite Marlene Knaus.

The 1976 season starts, with Lauda dominating the first two races while Hunt struggles to catch up. Hunt wins the Spanish Grand Prix, but is disqualified after a ruling that his car was marginally wider than permitted. Struggling to comply with F1 rules, McLaren suffers a series of racing setbacks, and Hunt's situation is exacerbated when he separates from Suzy and she starts seeing actor Richard Burton.

Following their divorce, Hunt regains his competitive spirit and, when his disqualification in Spain is overturned, the restored points put him into championship contention. Lauda marries Marlene in a private ceremony, but begins to have concerns about the effects of his newfound happiness, worrying that he has become vulnerable as a racer, as he now has something to lose.

On the day of the German Grand Prix, Lauda calls a drivers' meeting, urging the F1 committee to cancel the race due to heavy rain on the notoriously dangerous Nürburgring Nordschleife; the vote goes against cancellation after Hunt argues that Lauda is trying to personally benefit in competition by reducing the number of remaining races at a time when Lauda already has a significant points lead towards the season's championship.

Most drivers start the race with wet-weather tyres, which becomes a costly tactic due to most of the track quickly drying. They all change tyres during the second lap, pushing Hunt ahead of Lauda; the latter's attempts to catch up result in a suspension arm in his Ferrari breaking, causing a loss of control and crashing the car into an embankment where it bursts into flames. Lauda is airlifted to hospital with third-degree burns to his head and internal burns to his lungs. For six weeks, Lauda is treated for his agonising injuries while he watches Hunt, who is guilt-ridden by Lauda's condition, but dominates the races in his absence. Against doctors' orders, he returns to drive in the Italian Grand Prix, finishing fourth while Hunt fails to finish. This earns him an even greater respect from Hunt, who assaults a reporter at a press conference when he untastefuly comments on Lauda's burn scars.

The 1976 season comes to a climax at the rain-soaked Japanese Grand Prix. Hunt's late rally in Lauda's absence has pulled him within three points of Lauda. Hunt argues that the race should be canceled, but since the television rights were sold everywhere around the world, the Grand Prix still takes place. At the end of the second lap, after his car has slid several times, Lauda returns to the pits and decides to retire from the race, considering it too dangerous and opting to stay with Marlene instead. This allows Hunt to win the championship if he can finish third or better. After facing stiff competition under grueling conditions, tyre problems, and a hand injury due to his gear shifter breaking, Hunt finishes third, initially unaware that he has won the championship by a single point.

Hunt spends the rest of the year reveling in fame, sex, and drugs, while Lauda takes an interest in flying private planes. At an airfield in Bologna, Lauda urges Hunt to focus on the next racing season and defend his title, but Hunt argues that allowing himself to enjoy his victory through his glamorous lifestyle has been his highlight of being world champion, not their rivalry like it has been for Lauda. With this, Lauda realises that Hunt no longer feels he needs to prove himself to anyone.

In voiceover, Lauda reflects on how Hunt's continued hedonism limited his future success and led to his eventual death at age 45, but also on how their great rivalry and personality differences spurred each other on that one season. Lauda closes "He was among the very few I liked and even fewer that I respected. He remains the only person I envied."

== Cast ==
- Chris Hemsworth as James Hunt, a British F1 driver who races for McLaren
- Daniel Brühl as Niki Lauda, an Austrian F1 driver and Hunt's main rival who races for Scuderia Ferrari
- Olivia Wilde as Suzy Miller, Hunt's wife
- Alexandra Maria Lara as Marlene Knaus-Lauda, Niki Lauda's wife
- Pierfrancesco Favino as Clay Regazzoni, Niki Lauda's teammate
- David Calder as Louis Stanley, chairman of BRM
- Natalie Dormer as Nurse Gemma, a nurse who checks Hunt's injuries and is one of Hunt's girlfriends
- Stephen Mangan as Alastair Caldwell
- Christian McKay as Lord Hesketh
- Alistair Petrie as Stirling Moss
- Colin Stinton as Teddy Mayer
- Julian Rhind-Tutt as Anthony "Bubbles" Horsley
- Patrick Baladi as John Hogan

Hunt and Lauda appear as themselves, in the 1970s and 1980s, via archival footage at the end of the film, while Lauda is then seen for a few seconds in contemporary footage from 2013.

Former F1 driver Jochen Mass makes a cameo as himself during the scene at the German Grand Prix.

== Production ==
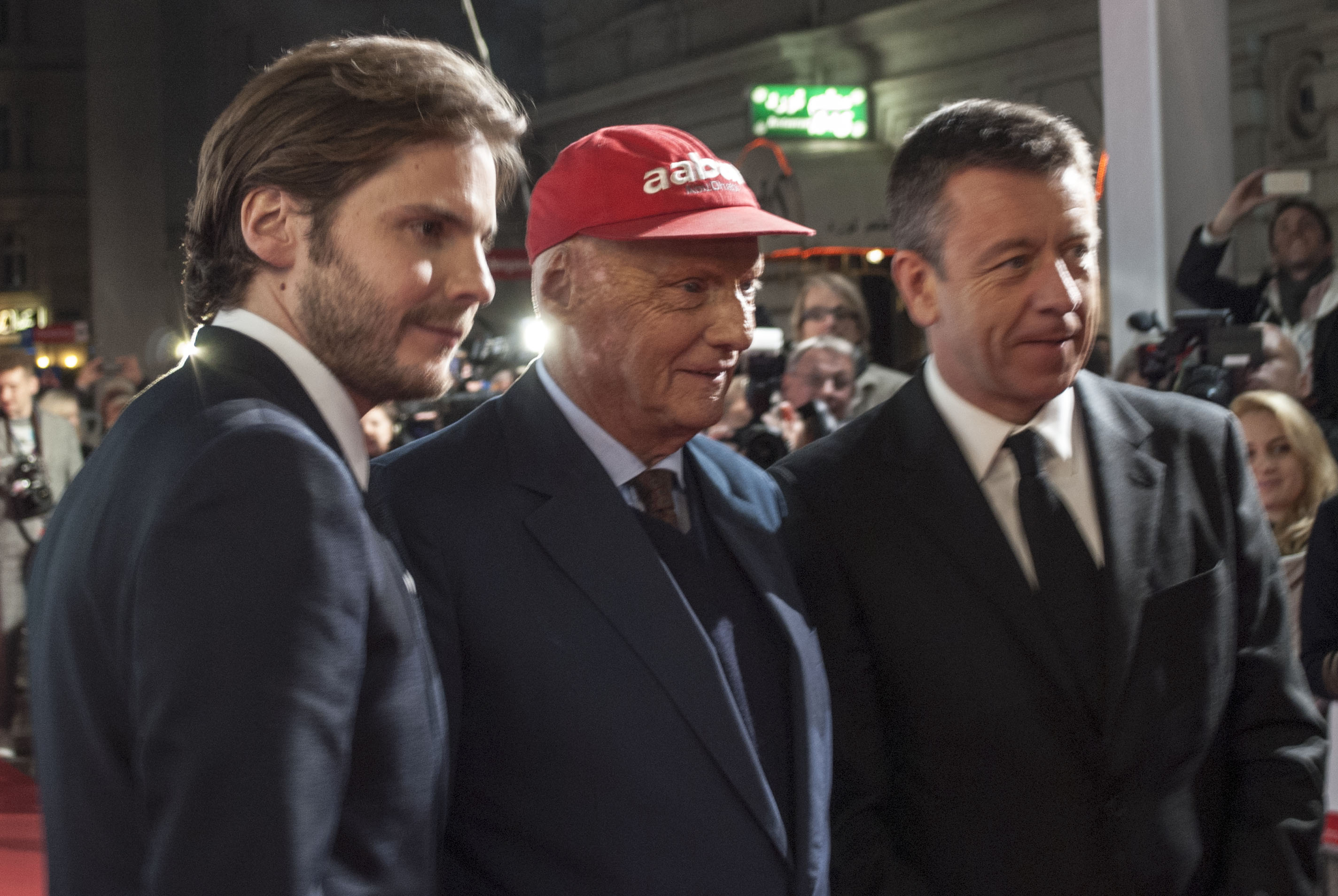
Daniel Brühl, Niki Lauda and Peter Morgan at the premiere of Rush in Vienna, Austria.

The film was shot on location in the United Kingdom, Germany and Austria, including Blackbushe Airport in Hampshire, the Snetterton (Norfolk), Cadwell Park (Lincolnshire), the former Crystal Palace and Brands Hatch (Kent) motor racing circuits in Britain, and at the Nürburgring in Germany. Both vintage racing cars and replicas were used in the filming.

The financiers include Hürth-based action concept Film- und Stuntproduktion, Egoli Tossell Film, Revolution Films (GB), and Cross Creek Pictures (US). The Film- und Medienstiftung NRW funded the film with €1.35 million, additional funding was provided by MFG Filmförderung Baden-Württemberg and the German Federal Film Fund (DFFF).

Director Ron Howard originally intended for Russell Crowe to make a cameo appearance as Richard Burton for a brief scene where he confronts James Hunt on his affair with Suzy.

== Music ==
The film's orchestral score was composed by Hans Zimmer. The soundtrack includes 1970s rock music by Dave Edmunds, Steve Winwood (originally performed and written by the Spencer Davis Group), Mud, Thin Lizzy and David Bowie.

== Release ==
=== Marketing ===
BBC Two aired the documentary Hunt vs. Lauda: F1's Greatest Racing Rivals, on 14 July 2013. The documentary provides an extensive look at the rivalry between Hunt and Lauda, featuring interviews with Lauda and former crew members of the McLaren and Ferrari teams.

The Ferrari & the Cinema Society jointly organised a screening of the film at Chelsea Clearview Cinemas in New York on 18 September 2013. Chris Hemsworth attended the screening.

=== Home media ===
Rush was released on DVD and Blu-ray on 28 January 2014. A Sainsbury's exclusive edition with a bonus disc of new special features was released for a limited time. The Australian Blu-ray release is bundled with the 2013 documentary 1. Shout! Factory released The film on 4K Ultra HD Blu-ray on November 19, 2024.

== Reception ==
=== Box office ===
Rush grossed $26.9 million in the United States and Canada, and $71.3 million from other territories, for a worldwide gross of $98.2 million, against a budget of $38 million.

After making $187,289 from five theaters in its opening weekend, the film expanded to 2,297 theaters the following weekend and made $10 million, finishing in third. It then made $4.5 million (a drop of 55%) and $2.4 million in its third and fourth weekends, finishing in fifth and eighth, respectively.

=== Critical response ===
On review aggregator website Rotten Tomatoes, the film holds an approval rating of 89% based on 235 reviews. The website's critical consensus reads, "A sleek, slick, well-oiled machine, Rush is a finely crafted sports drama with exhilarating race sequences and strong performances from Chris Hemsworth and Daniel Brühl." Another review aggregator, Metacritic, which assigns a normalised rating to reviews, calculated an average score of 74 out of 100, based on 43 critics, indicating "generally favorable reviews". Audiences polled by CinemaScore gave the film an average grade of "A−" on an A+ to F scale.

When Niki Lauda first saw the pre-screening of the unedited footage, he considered himself to be portrayed too negatively. This changed on the day of the first screening when Bernie Ecclestone told him how much he liked it. Lauda was pleased with the overall look of the film. He was quoted as saying: "When I saw it the first time I was impressed. There was no Hollywood changes or things changed a little bit Hollywood-like. It is very accurate. And this really surprised me very positively".

== Historical accuracy ==
Some things in the film are exaggerated (like the Hunt–Lauda rivalry; in reality they had shared a flat early in their careers and were good friends), others downplayed (like Lauda's wife's shock at his disfigurement), and others invented (like Hunt beating up a reporter on Lauda's behalf due to Lauda's marriage being questioned after his disfigurement, or the Nürburgring nickname being "the graveyard"; in fact Jackie Stewart had nicknamed it "the Green Hell"). Other inaccuracies include the British F3 battle at Crystal Palace, which in reality was between Hunt and Dave Morgan, and Hunt's overtake on Regazzoni for 3rd place in the Japanese Grand Prix when in the actual race he passed Alan Jones. The starting grid for the 1976 German Grand Prix is also incorrect, showing Jacques Laffite in P3, whereas it was actually Patrick Depailler. Another error in the Japanese Grand Prix is that Regazzoni and Laffite finished fourth and fifth, while in the actual race, it was Jones and Regazzoni who finished fourth and fifth. In the end scene, an incident is described where Hunt, while being a TV broadcaster, comes to a meet-up with Lauda on a bicycle with a flat tire. In reality, this incident happened while Hunt ran out of money and fell into alcohol addiction. On this day Lauda gave him money to rebuild his life, and Hunt got his life back on track and got a job as a television broadcaster.

== Accolades ==
Awards
Award	Category	Recipients and nominees	Result
AACTA International Awards	Best Film		Nominated
British Academy Film Awards	Outstanding British Film		Nominated
British Academy Film Awards	Best Supporting Actor	Daniel Brühl	Nominated
British Academy Film Awards	Best Editing	Daniel P. Hanley, Mike Hill	Won
British Academy Film Awards	Best Sound	Danny Hambrook, Frank Kruse, Markus Stemler	Nominated
Boston Society of Film Critics	Best Film Editing	Daniel P. Hanley, Mike Hill	Won
Critics' Choice Movie Awards	Best Action Movie		Nominated
Critics' Choice Movie Awards	Best Editing	Daniel P. Hanley, Mike Hill	Nominated
Critics' Choice Movie Awards	Best Makeup		Nominated
Critics' Choice Movie Awards	Best Supporting Actor	Daniel Brühl	Nominated
Empire Awards	Best British Film		Nominated
Empire Awards	Best Supporting Actor	Daniel Brühl	Nominated
Golden Globe Awards	Best Motion Picture – Drama		Nominated
Golden Globe Awards	Best Supporting Actor – Motion Picture	Daniel Brühl	Nominated
Phoenix Film Critics Society	Best Film Editing	Daniel P. Hanley, Mike Hill	Nominated
San Diego Film Critics Society	Best Supporting Actor	Daniel Brühl	Nominated
San Diego Film Critics Society	Best Score	Hans Zimmer	Nominated
Santa Barbara International Film Festival	Virtuoso Award	Daniel Brühl	Won
Satellite Awards	Best Director	Ron Howard	Nominated
Satellite Awards	Best Cinematography	Anthony Dod Mantle	Nominated
Satellite Awards	Best Visual Effects	Antoine Moulineau, Jody Johnson, Mark Hodgkins	Nominated
Satellite Awards	Best Editing	Daniel P. Hanley, Mike Hill	Nominated
Satellite Awards	Best Sound	Danny Hambrook, Frank Kruse, Markus Stemler	Nominated
Satellite Awards	Best Art Direction and Production Design	Mark Digby, Patrick Rolfe	Nominated
Satellite Awards	Best Costume Design	Julian Day	Nominated
Screen Actors Guild Award	Outstanding Performance by a Male Actor in a Supporting Role	Daniel Brühl	Nominated
Screen Actors Guild Award	Outstanding Performance by a Stunt Ensemble in a Motion Picture		Nominated
Visual Effects Society Awards	Outstanding Supporting Visual Effects in a Feature Motion Picture	Jody Johnson, Moriah Etherington-Sparks, Mark Hodgkins, Antoine Moulineau	Nominated
Washington D.C. Area Film Critics Association	Best Supporting Actor	Daniel Brühl	Nominated
Washington D.C. Area Film Critics Association	Best Editing	Dan Hanley, Mike Hill	Nominated

== See also ==
- Hunt–Lauda rivalry
