= The Dilemma =

2011 film by Ron Howard

- Theatrical release poster
- Directed by: Ron Howard
- Written by: Allan Loeb
- Produced by: Brian Grazer; Ron Howard; Vince Vaughn
- Starring: Vince Vaughn; Kevin James; Jennifer Connelly; Winona Ryder; Channing Tatum; Queen Latifah
- Cinematography: Salvatore Totino
- Edited by: Mike Hill; Daniel P. Hanley
- Music by: Hans Zimmer; Lorne Balfe
- Production companies: Imagine Entertainment; Spyglass Entertainment; Wild West Picture Show Productions
- Distributed by: Universal Pictures
- Release date: January 14, 2011
- Running time: 112 minutes
- Country: United States
- Language: English
- Budget: $70 million
- Box office: $69.7 million

The Dilemma is a 2011 American comedy-drama film written by Allan Loeb, directed by Ron Howard, and starring Vince Vaughn and Kevin James. The film follows savvy businessman Ronny (Vaughn) and genius engineer Nick (James), who are best friends and partners in an auto design firm, as they are pursuing a project to make their firm famous. When Ronny sees Nick's wife Geneva (Winona Ryder) kissing another man (Channing Tatum), he seeks out answers and has to figure out how to tell Nick about what he saw while working with him to complete their critical presentation.

It was filmed entirely in the Chicago metropolitan area. The Dilemma was released by Universal Pictures in the United States and Canada on January 14, 2011. The film received mixed to negative reviews from critics and grossed $69.7 million against a $70 million budget.

== Plot ==
Ronny and Nick are best friends and partners in a small auto design firm in Chicago. Ronny is in a long-term relationship with his girlfriend Beth while Nick is married to Geneva. The two have recently been given an opportunity to pitch an eco friendly car to Dodge.

While at a botanical gardens planning a way to propose marriage to Beth, Ronny sees Geneva kissing a man named Zip. He comes home upset, but lies to Beth about the reason, causing her to worry that the stress of work has caused a recurrence of Ronny's gambling addiction.

Ronny makes up his mind to inform Nick about Geneva's infidelity, but puts it off after Nick expresses stress about their work. He meets with Geneva during a Blackhawks game, who promises that the affair is over and that she will tell Nick as soon as the big project is finished. Ronny subsequently discovers her and Zip continuing their relationship. Geneva then threatens to accuse Ronny of hitting on her and tell Nick about a fling they had had back in college.

When Ronny follows Geneva to Zip's house, he photographs the two of them together, but he is trapped on the patio by a group of skateboarders and is unable to escape. Once Geneva leaves, Ronny is caught by Zip and the two engage in a physical confrontation. In spite of this, Ronny eventually makes it to Beth's parents' 40th wedding anniversary party.

Ronny's increasingly erratic behavior leads his friends to think that he has begun gambling again. They hold an intervention for him but Ronny explains the truth behind his actions and Geneva admits to the affair and Ronny admits to the fling with Geneva. While Nick is upset about both, he eventually forgives Ronny and separates from Geneva for her affair with Zip. Later, Nick and Ronny have their design accepted by Dodge; and Ronny proposes to Beth.

== Cast ==
- Vince Vaughn as Ronny Valentine
- Kevin James as Nick Brannen
- Jennifer Connelly as Beth
- Winona Ryder as Geneva
- Channing Tatum as Zip
- Amy Morton as Diane Popovich
- Queen Latifah as Susan Warner
- Chelcie Ross as Thomas Fern
- Eduardo N. Martinez as Felix
- Clint Howard as Herbert Trimpy
- Troy West as Dr. Rosenstone

In addition to his brother Clint, the director's father, actor Rance Howard, appears in the film.

== Production ==
The Dilemma is directed by Ron Howard and written by Allan Loeb. The film was Howard's first comedy film since he directed How the Grinch Stole Christmas in 2000. The film was first announced in January 2010 as an untitled project when actor Vince Vaughn signed on for a starring role. The premise was conceived by producer Brian Grazer, Howard's production partner at Imagine Entertainment; Loeb wrote the script. Actor Kevin James was cast alongside Vaughn in February. The film continues "Vaughn's interest in tackling the dark areas of relationships", following The Break-Up (2006) and Couples Retreat (2009). The darker moments of the latter film were omitted from the final edit.

With a budget of $70 million, filming took place entirely in Chicago, Illinois, from late May 2010 to mid-August 2010. The film, which was called Cheaters and What You Don't Know during production, was ultimately titled The Dilemma by Universal.

In a 2025 interview with Vulture, Howard called the film a disappointment:

...from the test audiences, you could just see it didn’t have it... it turned out that infidelity was not funny to people. We were pretty smugly certain that it was. And it had some sequences I was really proud of. Channing Tatum gives me credit for teaching him and the world that he could be funny because he was great in this one sequence. Everybody worked real hard on it and believed in it. But it was an interesting example of being tone-deaf at that time.

=== Controversy in advertising ===
The trailer for the film drew complaints about the pejorative use of "gay" in Vaughn's line in the trailer's opening scene: "Electric cars are gay. I mean, not homosexual gay, but my-parents-are-chaperoning-the-dance gay." Universal said it contacted the Gay & Lesbian Alliance Against Defamation (GLAAD) about the line before the trailer was released, and GLAAD said the step indicated the studio knew the line was problematic. Universal received complaints when the trailer appeared online before in theaters, and the studio sought to work with GLAAD to prepare a new trailer.

Before action was taken, the line was first publicly criticized by journalist Anderson Cooper in a story about gay bullying on his show Anderson Cooper 360°. Universal and GLAAD disputed each other's actions toward remedy, and GLAAD requested for the trailer to be removed and for the line to be removed from the film itself. Ultimately, the studio released a new trailer without the offending line. Universal deferred to Howard, who had final cut privilege, to decide about removing the line from the film, and the director chose to keep it.

Howard supported the removal of the line from advertising, but he justified his decision to keep it in the film, saying, "If storytellers, comedians, actors and artists are strong-armed into making creative changes, it will endanger comedy as both entertainment and a provoker of thought."

== Release ==
=== Theatrical run ===
The Dilemma had its world premiere in Chicago on January 6, 2011. The film was commercially released in 2,940 theaters in the United States and Canada on January 14, 2011. It grossed a four-day total of $20.5 million over the Martin Luther King, Jr. Day holiday weekend, ranking second at the box office after fellow opener The Green Hornet. Prior to The Dilemma's release, Variety reported that with The Green Hornet attracting young people, The Dilemma was expected to serve as counterprogramming, attracting people 25 years old and up. Universal had expected the film to gross in the mid-teen millions. Exit polling showed that 60% of the audience was female and that 58% were 30 years old and older. While adult audiences generally shy away from films' opening weekends, The Dilemma performed above the studio's expectations. The Dilemma also opened in four territories outside the United States and Canada, grossing $1.8 million. The film's opening in Australia grossed $1.4 million despite floods in Queensland and in Victoria affecting 14% of the area's theaters.

The Dilemma's opening was a relative low for the film's stars. Vaughn's previous films Couples Retreat (2009) and Four Christmases (2008) grossed twice The Dilemma's amount on their opening weekends. James had appeared in Grown Ups (2010) and Paul Blart: Mall Cop (2009), both of which also had stronger openings. According to Box Office Mojo, The Dilemma was weakly advertised, especially compared to The Green Hornet. It reported, "Blink-and-you-miss-them television ads failed to convey the premise or provide laughs. Dilemma's premise of a man learning his friend's wife is cheating and debating whether to tell the friend or not wasn't much of a dilemma, and it wasn't as comedically charged as Vaughn's other relationship comedies."

The film grossed $48.5 million in the United States and Canada and $21.2 million in other territories for a worldwide gross of $69.7 million.

=== Critical response ===
On the review aggregator website Rotten Tomatoes, 24% of 156 critics' reviews are positive. The website's consensus reads: "It boasts a likable cast and an interesting premise, but The Dilemma can't decide what to do with them; the result is an uneven blend of cheesy slapstick and surprisingly dark comedy." Metacritic, which uses a weighted average, assigned the film a score of 46 out of 100, based on 32 critics, indicating "mixed or average" reviews. Audiences surveyed by CinemaScore gave the film a grade B on a scale from A+ to F.

Betsy Sharkey of the Los Angeles Times wrote: "What The Dilemma ultimately does best is create a platform for Vaughn to drag that iconic character of his into full-blown adulthood." Justin Chang of Variety wrote: "Not a particularly funny movie. Indeed, the true dilemma of this misguided seriocomedy lies in the filmmakers' confusion as to whether they're making a side-splitting bromance (nope) or an unsparing, warts-and-all look at screwed-up relationships (sort of)." David Edelstein of New York magazine wrote: "Perhaps the late Blake Edwards could have found a balance between slapstick and psychodrama, but Ron Howard can't get the pacing right, and Allan Loeb's script is even wordier than the one he wrote for Wall Street: Money Never Sleeps."

In a 2021 reappraisal, The Guardian's Stephen Snart wrote in defense of The Dilemma. He praised "Ron Howard's quietly impressive craftsmanship" which explores "the insidious undercurrents of the bromances without sacrificing the infectious joviality of male bonding".

=== Home media ===
The DVD and Blu-ray was released on May 3, 2011, in the United States. It earned $8.9 million from DVD and Blu-Ray sales.

On October 5, 2021, Mill Creek Entertainment released a Blu-ray double feature that contained the film and Vaughn's fellow Universal film The Break-Up (2006).
