= Night Shift (1982 film) =

1982 film by Ron Howard

- Theatrical release poster
- Directed by: Ron Howard
- Written by: Lowell Ganz; Babaloo Mandel
- Produced by: Brian Grazer
- Starring: Henry Winkler; Michael Keaton; Shelley Long
- Cinematography: James Crabe
- Edited by: Robert J. Kern Jr.; Daniel P. Hanley; Mike Hill
- Music by: Burt Bacharach
- Production company: The Ladd Company
- Distributed by: Warner Bros.
- Release date: July 30, 1982
- Running time: 105 minutes
- Country: United States
- Language: English
- Budget: $8.1 million
- Box office: $21.1 million

Night Shift is a 1982 American comedy film directed by Ron Howard. The film centers on a timid night-shift morgue employee whose life is turned upside down by a new co-worker who fancies himself a free-spirited entrepreneur. It stars Henry Winkler along with Michael Keaton, in his first starring role, and Shelley Long. Also appearing are Richard Belzer and Clint Howard. There are brief scenes with a young Kevin Costner as "frat boy #1", Shannen Doherty as a Bluebird scout, Vincent Schiavelli as a man who delivers a sandwich, and Charles Fleischer as one of the jail prisoners.

The film was a critical and financial success. Winkler, who had previously worked with Ron Howard on the hit television show Happy Days, was nominated for the Golden Globe Award for Best Actor – Motion Picture Musical or Comedy, while Keaton won the Kansas City Film Critics Circle Award for Best Supporting Actor.

== Plot ==
Charles "Chuck" Lumley, formerly a successful stockbroker, has found a refuge from the ulcer-inducing Wall Street rat race in his job as an attendant at a New York City morgue. His displeasure at being "promoted" to night-shift supervisor to make room for his boss' nephew, Leonard, is exacerbated by the irrational exuberance of Bill "Blaze" Blazejowski, his new co-worker. They are inspired by the plight of Chuck's prostitute neighbor, Belinda, to apply Chuck's financial acumen and Bill's entrepreneurial spirit to open a prostitution service headquartered at the morgue.

Chuck falls in love with Belinda, but their relationship becomes complicated when Belinda refuses to quit prostitution. Chuck's passiveness keeps him from telling Belinda he loves her. Meanwhile, Chuck and Bill's foray into the prostitution business draws the ire of dangerous pimps who come to the morgue and threaten to kill Chuck. Bill inadvertently leads two undercover police officers to the morgue where Chuck is being assaulted by the pimps. A shootout ensues. Chuck and Bill are rescued, but are arrested for promoting prostitution. Because their arrest would be a political embarrassment, the two men are offered their old jobs back and a dismissal of all charges. Chuck accepts this, but Bill sees it as an opportunity to bargain with the mayor's office. Chuck and Bill fight and part ways. Chuck's fiancée Charlotte ends their engagement.

Chuck sees Belinda in the hall of their apartment complex, but again fails to express his true feelings for her. Belinda leaves, and Chuck becomes angry with himself for being afraid. With renewed determination, Chuck finds Belinda working in an adult club and professes his love for her. He also finds Bill is employed there, apologizes for his harsh words, and assures Bill of the value of his creative ideas. The three leave the club together and go out on the town.

== Cast ==
- Henry Winkler as Chuck Lumley
- Michael Keaton as Bill Blazejowski
- Shelley Long as Belinda Keaton
- Gina Hecht as Charlotte Koogle
- Pat Corley as Edward Koogle
- Bobby Di Cicco as Leonard Carbone
- Nita Talbot as Vivian Lumley
- Basil Hoffman as Drollhauser
- Tim Rossovich as Luke
- Clint Howard as Jefferey
- Joe Spinell as Manetti
- Richard Belzer as Pig
- Grand L. Bush as Mustafa
- Charles Fleischer as prisoner
- Vincent Schiavelli as Carl
- Dawn Dunlap as Maxine
- Kevin Costner as frat boy #1
- Shannen Doherty as Bluebird
- Floyd Levine as "Uncle" Sal Corbone

== Soundtrack ==
The film's opening theme song is "Night Shift" by Quarterflash. The closing theme song, "That's What Friends Are For" was written by Burt Bacharach and Carole Bayer Sager and performed by Rod Stewart. It gained popularity a few years later when covered by Dionne Warwick, Elton John, Gladys Knight, and Stevie Wonder.

The official soundtrack was released in 1982 on the Warner Bros. label. It included ten selected tracks from the film, six of which were written specifically for the film:

1. "Night Shift" by Quarterflash
2. "Street Talk" by Burt Bacharach
3. "Girls Know How" by Al Jarreau
4. "The Love Too Good to Last" by The Pointer Sisters
5. "That's What Friends Are For" by Rod Stewart
6. "Someday, Someway" by Marshall Crenshaw
7. "Penthouse and Pavement" by Heaven 17
8. "Talk Talk" by Talk Talk
9. "Everlasting Love" by Rufus and Chaka Khan
10. "That's What Friends Are For (Night Shift Love Theme) (instrumental)" by Burt Bacharach

The soundtrack was released solely on vinyl and cassette. The versions of "Talk Talk" and "Penthouse and Pavement" that are on the soundtrack are different from any other releases of the songs as they were specially mixed for the soundtrack.

Other songs heard in the film include "You Really Got Me" by Van Halen and a live version of "Jumpin' Jack Flash" by the Rolling Stones, taken from the 1977 live album Love You Live; a section of "Cutting Branches for a Temporary Shelter" by the Penguin Cafe Orchestra is also heard. Also heard in the background were two songs by Jerry_Riggs, "Ready Or Not" and "Take It Off" from his only solo album, "Riggs" released by Full_Moon_Records in 1981.

== Reception ==
=== Box office ===
Night Shift grossed $21,095,638 at the domestic box office.

=== Critical reception ===
Night Shift received mostly positive reviews from critics. On review aggregator website Rotten Tomatoes the film holds an approval rating of 93% based on 28 reviews, with an average rating of 6.70/10. The site's critics consensus reads, "Night Shift bristles with pitch-perfect laughs thanks to Ron Howard's snappy direction and a side-splitting turn from Michael Keaton." On Metacritic, the film has a weighted average score of 62 out of 100, based on 11 reviews, indicating "generally favorable reviews". Many reviewers praised the performances of the two male leads, particularly Michael Keaton.

TV Guide's Movie Guide wrote that "Winkler turns in the best performance of his career, and Keaton is wonderful." The Chicago Reader's Jonathan Rosenbaum compared Night Shift to the subsequent comedy film Risky Business (which also dealt with the theme of prostitution), noting that Night Shift is not "as snappily directed or as caustically conceived, ... but it's arguably just as sexy and almost as funny." Janet Maslin of The New York Times, however, deemed Night Shift "a halfway funny movie, one that's got loads of good gags in its first half and nothing but trouble in its second." Gene Siskel, writing in the Chicago Tribune, gave the film two stars out of four but hailed Keaton's "superb comic performance", writing that "based on this one role, I would now pay to see Keaton in just about anything. Anything except Night Shift."
