= The Missing (2003 film) =

2003 film by Ron Howard

- Theatrical release poster
- Directed by: Ron Howard
- Written by: Ken Kaufman
- Based on: The Last Ride by Thomas Eidson
- Produced by: Brian Grazer; Ron Howard; Daniel Ostroff
- Starring: Tommy Lee Jones; Cate Blanchett; Evan Rachel Wood; Jenna Boyd; Eric Schweig; Aaron Eckhart
- Cinematography: Salvatore Totino
- Edited by: Daniel P. Hanley; Mike Hill
- Music by: James Horner
- Production companies: Columbia Pictures; Revolution Studios; Imagine Entertainment
- Distributed by: Sony Pictures Releasing
- Release date: November 26, 2003
- Running time: 137 minutes 154 minutes (extended)
- Country: United States
- Languages: English; Spanish; Apache
- Budget: $60 million
- Box office: $38.4 million

The Missing is a 2003 American Western film directed by Ron Howard and starring Tommy Lee Jones and Cate Blanchett. It is based on Thomas Eidson's 1995 novel The Last Ride. Set in 1885 New Mexico Territory, the film is notable for the authentic use of the Apache language by various actors, some of whom spent long hours studying it. It was produced by Columbia Pictures, Revolution Studios and Imagine Entertainment and released by Sony Pictures Releasing on November 26, 2003. The film received mixed reviews from critics and was a box office bomb, grossing $38.4 million against a $60 million budget.

== Plot ==
In late 19th-century New Mexico, Samuel Jones arrives at the house of his daughter Magdalena "Maggie" Gilkeson, hoping to reconcile with her after abandoning her and her mother decades before. She is unable to forgive him, feeling he caused her mother's early death, turning him away the next morning. Renegade Apache Pesh-Chidin, alias El Brujo and followers raid the area, killing settlers and taking women and girls to sell into sex slavery in Mexico. Among those abducted is Maggie's first daughter, Lilly. Maggie's rancher boyfriend Brake Baldwin was among the settlers killed. Maggie secures her father's release from jail, and the two decide to go after the abducted girls, taking her younger daughter Dot with them. The sheriff is unwilling to spare any men for the mission.

The party encounter some U.S. Cavalry soldiers at another ranch that was attacked by El Brujo. These men suspect Jones as having led the raiders, but Maggie eases the situation. The lieutenant in charge evades helping them, as he must lead his unit to carry out the forced relocation of captive Native Americans. Maggie, her father, and Dot are the only ones tracking El Brujo and his warriors.

After the three fail to ambush the raiders, they are rescued by Kayitah, a Chiricahua friend of Jones. Kayitah and his son Honesco are also tracking El Brujo because Honesco's fiancée is among the captives. Kayitah and Honesco agree to join Maggie and her family. Kayitah tells her that her father had traveled for some time with his Chiricahua band, who called him Chaa-duu-ba-its-iidan.

Together the two families find and free the female captives. Lilly accidentally alerts the bandits, resulting in the death of Kayitah. The survivors steal El Brujo's horses and flee to the mountains. The Mexican slave traders arrive to buy the women, but the kidnappers murder them and steal their horses to chase the fleeing women. Jones leads the group to a bluff he knows, with a strong defensive position. The kidnappers can only attack up a steep, narrow path. During a standoff, Jones tries to explain to Maggie why he abandoned the family, saying that Chaa-duu-ba-its-iidan means "shit for luck". Maggie says she does not forgive him.

The group fights off an attack by the remaining kidnappers. Jones and Maggie hold off the attackers, but El Brujo stealthily climbs up the side of the cliff and injures Honesco, while his followers use fire arrows to spread panic in the camp. Maggie heads into the camp to fight El Brujo, but he ambushes her. Jones lights bushes on fire to slow down the attackers, and confronts El Brujo, in revenge for kidnapping his granddaughter. Despite being stabbed, El Brujo gains the upper hand and tries to kill Maggie. Jones intervenes, and he and El Brujo fall off a cliff to their deaths. Maggie shoots at the last remaining kidnappers to scare them off.

Maggie returns home with her father's body, her daughters, Honesco, and the other kidnapped girls.

== Cast ==
- Tommy Lee Jones as Samuel Jones, Maggie's estranged dad who abandoned her when she was young
- Cate Blanchett as Magdalena "Maggie" Gilkeson, Samuel's daughter
- Evan Rachel Wood as Lilly Gilkeson, Maggie's daughter who is kidnapped
- Jenna Boyd as Dot Gilkeson
- Aaron Eckhart as Brake Baldwin, Maggie's boyfriend
- Val Kilmer as Lieutenant Jim Ducharme
- Sergio Calderón as Emiliano
- Eric Schweig as Chidin/El Brujo
- Elisabeth Moss as Anne
- Steve Reevis as Two Stone
- Jay Tavare as Kayitah
- Simon Baker as Honesco
- Deryle J. Lujan as Naazhaań, Hunter
- David Midthunder as Apache Scout
- Clint Howard as Sheriff Purdy
- Ray McKinnon as Russell J. Wittick
- Max Perlich as Isaac Edgerly

== Production ==
In September 2002, it was reported that after Ron Howard departed The Alamo, he was in negotiations with Revolution Studios to direct an adaptation of The Last Ride, an adaptation of the novel of the same name by Thomas Eidson written by Ken Kaufman. The following month, Tommy Lee Jones and Cate Blanchett had been cast in the film. By January 2003, Evan Rachel Wood had been cast in the film which had since been retitled The Missing with plans for production to commence in New Mexico in March. By March, Aaron Eckhart, Val Kilmer, and Eric Schweig had been cast in roles in the film.

== Reception ==
The Missing earned mixed reviews from critics. On Rotten Tomatoes, a review aggregator, the film has an approval rating of 58% based on 174 reviews; the average rating is 6.10/10. The website's critical consensus reads, "An expertly acted and directed Western. But like other Ron Howard features, the movie is hardly subtle." On Metacritic, the film has a score of 55 out of 100 based on 40 critics, indicating "mixed or average reviews". Audiences polled by CinemaScore gave the film an average grade of "B" on an A+ to F scale. Philip French of The Observer referred to the film as Howard's "finest film to date," and Michael Wilmington of the Chicago Tribune called it the "best and toughest western since Unforgiven."

The Missing was well received among Native American populations within the United States. Many praised its use of Apache dialect, saying that it was so well spoken it could be understood by most Chiricahua-speaking adults. Tommy Lee Jones, Jay Tavare, Simon R. Baker, and others, learned to speak some dialogue in the Chiricahua dialect of Apache; this was used throughout the film. Tavare has noted that only about 300 people are considered fluent speakers of Chiricahua today. Following screenings of the film, Native American students said that it stimulated pride among them because of its authenticity.

The Missing grossed $27 million domestically and $11.4 million internationally for a worldwide total of $38.4 million.
