= Brian Grazer =

American film and television producer (born 1951)

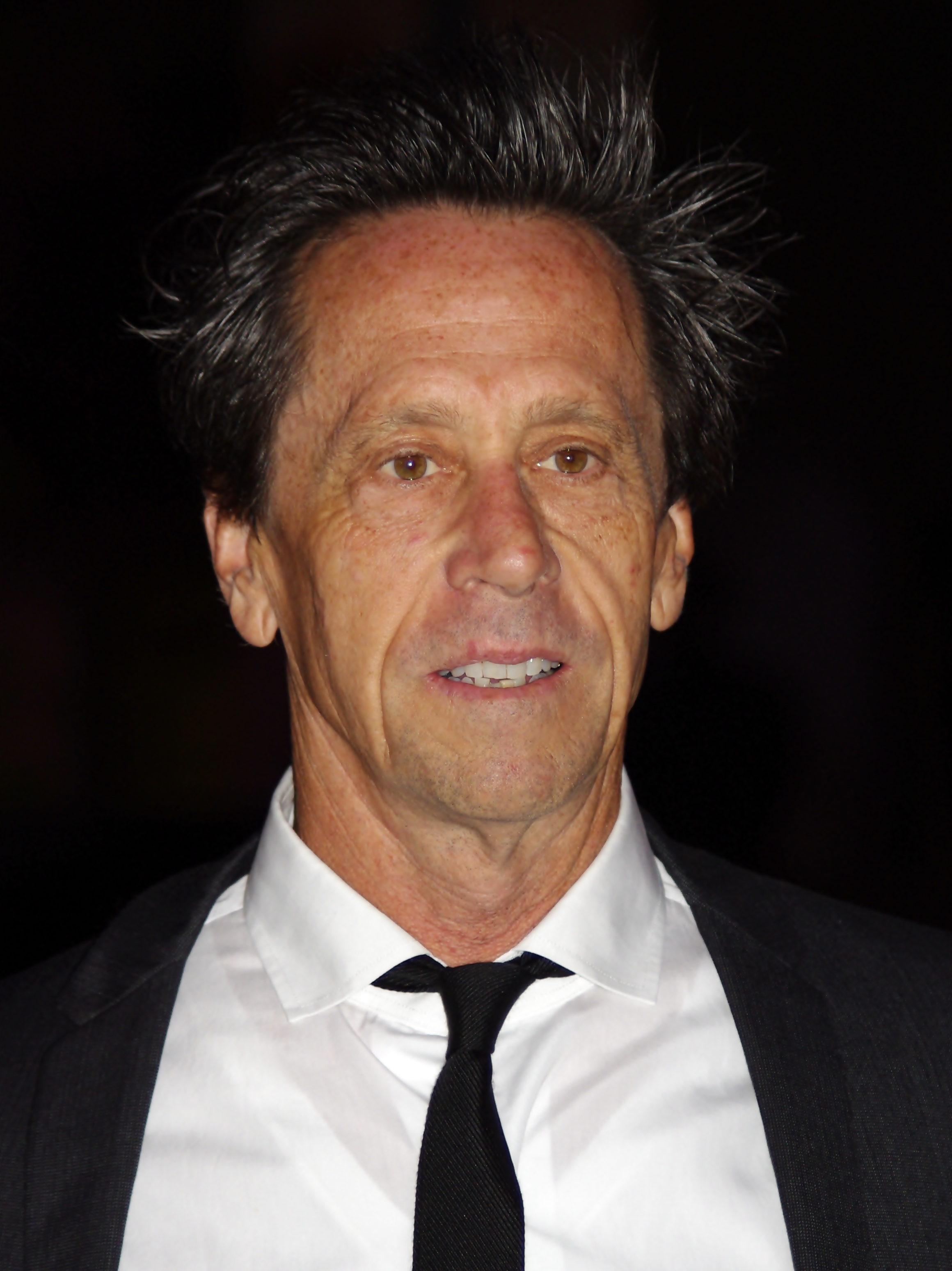
- Grazer in 2011
- Born: Brian Thomas Grazer; July 12, 1951 (age 75); Los Angeles, California, U.S.
- Education: University of Southern California (BA)
- Occupations: Producer; writer
- Years active: 1978–present
- Organization: Imagine Entertainment
- Spouses: Corki Corman (m. 1982; div. 1992) Gigi Levangie (m. 1997; div. 2007) Veronica Smiley (m. 2016)
- Children: 4
- Relatives: Jack Dylan Grazer (nephew)
- Awards: Academy Award for Best Picture; A Beautiful Mind (2001)

Brian Thomas Grazer (born July 12, 1951) is an American film and television producer. He founded Imagine Entertainment in 1985 with Ron Howard. The films they produced have grossed over $15 billion. Grazer was personally nominated for four Academy Awards for the films Splash (1984), Apollo 13 (1995), A Beautiful Mind (2001), and Frost/Nixon (2008); he won Best Picture for producing A Beautiful Mind. His films and television series have been nominated for 47 Academy Awards and 217 Emmy Awards. In 2007, he was named one of Time's "100 Most Influential People in the World".

== Early life and education ==
Grazer was born in Los Angeles, California, to Arlene Becker Grazer and criminal defense attorney Thomas Grazer. He is the older brother of Nora Beth Grazer (b. 1952) and actor/director Gavin Grazer (b. 1961). He was raised in Sherman Oaks and Northridge, in Los Angeles's San Fernando Valley.

Grazer's father was Catholic and his mother is Jewish. His parents divorced when he was in high school. Grazer said "My best buddy, the most important person in my growing up, was my little 4-foot-10 [147 cm] Jewish grandmother, and she'd say, 'In order to get it, you got to do it. No one's going to get it for you, Brian.'"

While in school, Grazer struggled with dyslexia. Grazer got through school by reading other students' papers and arguing his grades with his teachers.

His nephew is actor Jack Dylan Grazer.

Grazer won a scholarship to the University of Southern California (USC) as a psychology major. He graduated from USC's School of Cinema-Television in 1974. He then attended USC Law School for one year, but quit in 1975 to pursue a life in Hollywood.

== Career ==
Grazer began his career as a producer developing television projects. While executive-producing television pilots at Paramount Pictures in the early 1980s, he met current long-time friend and business collaborator Ron Howard.

He produced his first feature film, Night Shift, in 1982, directed by Howard. Grazer and Howard collaborated again for Splash in 1984, which Grazer produced and co-wrote. Splash earned him an Academy Award nomination for Best Original Screenplay of 1984. Grazer went on to become an independent producer, collaborating with Tri-Star Pictures to set up plans for a film to star Richard Pryor, and had a continuing relationship with The Walt Disney Studios, and has plans to develop projects for Paramount Pictures.

In November 1985, Grazer and Howard co-founded Imagine Entertainment, which became one of Hollywood's most prolific and successful production companies. Over the years, Grazer's films and television shows have been nominated for a total of 43 Academy Awards, and 198 Emmys. At the same time, his movies have generated over $15 billion in worldwide theatrical, music, and video grosses.

Grazer's early film successes include Parenthood (1989) and Backdraft (1991). He produced Apollo 13 (1995), for which he won the Producers Guild of America's Daryl F. Zanuck Motion Picture Producer of the Year Award, as well as an Academy Award nomination for Best Picture of 1995.

In 1998, he earned two major honors: he was given his own star on the Hollywood Walk of Fame, and made a cameo appearance on the animated series The Simpsons.

In 2001, Grazer won an Academy Award for Best Picture for A Beautiful Mind, which also took home Academy Awards for Best Supporting Actress (Jennifer Connelly), Best Director (Ron Howard), and Best Adapted Screenplay (Akiva Goldsman).

In 2002, Grazer's 8 Mile was released. It proved not only to be a huge box office hit, but also the first film with a rap song to win a Academy Award for Best Original Song, for Eminem's "Lose Yourself".

Grazer also produced the film adaptation of Peter Morgan's play Frost/Nixon (2008). Frost/Nixon was nominated for five Academy Awards, including Best Picture.

Grazer's productions span over a quarter of a century, and almost the full spectrum of movie genres. His comedies include Boomerang (1992), The Nutty Professor (1996), Liar Liar (1997), Life (1999), How the Grinch Stole Christmas (2000), Intolerable Cruelty (2003) and The Spy Who Dumped Me (2018). He has also produced many dramatic thrillers including Inside Man (2006), The Da Vinci Code (2006), American Gangster (2007), Changeling (2008), Angels & Demons (2009), Robin Hood (2010), and Cowboys & Aliens (2011). His recently released films include J. Edgar, the Clint Eastwood-directed biopic of J. Edgar Hoover, starring Leonardo DiCaprio, Tower Heist, starring Ben Stiller and Eddie Murphy, and Restless, directed by Gus Van Sant.

Grazer's Imagine Entertainment's television series include Sports Night, Felicity, Arrested Development, 24 with Kiefer Sutherland, Friday Night Lights, Parenthood, Lie to Me, Empire, Genius: Einstein, Genius: Picasso, and Wu-Tang: An American Saga.

Grazer's recent productions includes Rebuilding Paradise, Dads, the 2017 Grammy awarding winning Best Music Film The Beatles: Eight Days a Week (2016), American Made (2017), Rush (2013), directed by Ron Howard, and starring Chris Hemsworth and Daniel Brühl, and Made in America.

Grazer produced Get on Up, a biopic of the legendary "Godfather of Soul" James Brown, and In the Heart of the Sea, directed by Ron Howard and starring Chris Hemsworth, about the American whaleship the Essex.

In 2015, Grazer published his book A Curious Mind: The Secret to a Bigger Life, a #1 NY Times Bestseller, in which he discusses conversations with interesting people, many of whom inspired his work. In 2019, Grazer released his second book Face to Face: The Art of Human Connection.

In January 2024, it was announced that Scar Tissue, the autobiography of Anthony Kiedis, singer for the Red Hot Chili Peppers, will be turned into a theatrical movie with Grazer, Kiedis and Guy Oseary producing the film for Universal Pictures.

== Personal life ==
Grazer has been married three times: Corki Corman (1982–1992; they have two children), and novelist and screenwriter Gigi Levangie (1997–2007; they have two sons). In April 2014, Grazer became engaged to Veronica Smiley, chief marketing officer of SBE, a hotel management company. They married on February 20, 2016.

Grazer currently resides in Santa Monica, California. He also has a home in Hawaii on Sunset Beach, on the Banzai Pipeline on O'ahu's North Shore. He is a keen user of jump ropes.

In June 2025, The New York Times reported on Grazer's appearance in a documentary series called Art of the Surge. In the show, Grazer says that he voted for Donald Trump in the 2024 U.S. presidential election, which Trump won. Grazer says that he opted for Trump because “I could feel and see Biden’s deterioration and the lack of direction in the Democratic Party at that time.” The Times also notes that Grazer produced Hillbilly Elegy, the movie based on the memoir of Vice President J.D. Vance.

== Filmography ==
=== Film ===
Producer

- Night Shift (1982)
- Splash (1984)
- Real Genius (1985)
- Spies Like Us (1985)
- Armed and Dangerous (1986)
- Like Father Like Son (1987)
- Parenthood (1989)
- Kindergarten Cop (1990)
- My Girl (1991)
- Far and Away (1992)
- Housesitter (1992)
- Boomerang (1992)
- For Love or Money (1993)
- My Girl 2 (1994)
- Greedy (1994)
- The Paper (1994)
- The Cowboy Way (1994)
- Apollo 13 (1995)
- Sgt. Bilko (1996)
- Fear (1996)
- The Nutty Professor (1996)
- The Chamber (1996)
- Ransom (1996)
- Liar Liar (1997)
- Inventing the Abbotts (1997)
- Mercury Rising (1998)
- Psycho (1998)
- EDtv (1999)
- Life (1999)
- Bowfinger (1999)
- Nutty Professor II: The Klumps (2000)
- How the Grinch Stole Christmas (2000)
- A Beautiful Mind (2001)
- Undercover Brother (2002)
- Blue Crush (2002)
- 8 Mile (2002)
- Intolerable Cruelty (2003)
- The Cat in the Hat (2003)
- The Missing (2003)
- Friday Night Lights (2004)
- Cinderella Man (2005)
- Flightplan (2005)
- Fun with Dick and Jane (2005)
- Inside Man (2006)
- The Da Vinci Code (2006)
- American Gangster (2007)
- Changeling (2008)
- Frost/Nixon (2008)
- Angels & Demons (2009)
- Robin Hood (2010)
- The Dilemma (2011)
- Restless (2011)
- Cowboys & Aliens (2011)
- Tower Heist (2011)
- J. Edgar (2011)
- Rush (2013)
- Get On Up (2014)
- The Good Lie (2014)
- In the Heart of the Sea (2015)
- Pelé: Birth of a Legend (2016)
- Lowriders (2016)
- Inferno (2016)
- American Made (2017)
- The Spy Who Dumped Me (2018)
- Pavarotti (2019)
- Dads (2019)
- Rebuilding Paradise (2020)
- Breakthrough: Virus Fighters (2020)
- Hillbilly Elegy (2020)
- Tick, Tick... Boom! (2021)
- Thirteen Lives (2022)
- We Feed People (2022)
- Candy Cane Lane (2023)
- Jim Henson Idea Man (2024)
- Music by John Williams (2024)
- After the Hunt (2025)
- Avedon (2026)
- Whalefall (2026)
- How to Rob a Bank (2026)
- Spaceballs: The New One (2027)
- Snoop (2027)
- Alone at Dawn (2027)

Executive producer

- Cry-Baby (1990)
- The Doors (1991)
- Closet Land (1991)
- Backdraft (1991)
- CB4 (1993)
- The Alamo (2004)
- Curious George (2006)
- Curious George 2: Follow That Monkey! (2009) (Direct-to-video)
- Take Me Home Tonight (2011)
- Curious George 3: Back to the Jungle (2015) (Direct-to-video)
- Rock the Kasbah (2015)
- The Dark Tower (2017)
- Cop and a Half: New Recruit (2017) (Direct-to-video)
- Backdraft 2 (2019) (Direct-to-video)
- Once Were Brothers: Robbie Robertson and The Band (2019)
- Curious George: Royal Monkey (2019) (Direct-to-video)
- Breakthrough: Virus Fighters (2020)
- Crime Scene: The Vanishing at the Cecil Hotel (2021)
- Julia (2021)
- Frida (2024)
- Music by John Williams (2024)
- Pets (2025)
- Barbara Walters: Tell Me Everything (2025)
- Marty, Life Is Short (2026)
- Freefall: A Reckoning for Boeing (2026)

Story writer

- Splash (1984)
- Armed and Dangerous (1986)
- Housesitter (1992)

Music department

Year	Film	Role	Notes
1995	Apollo 13	Executive music producer	Uncredited

Thanks

Year	Film	Notes
2015	The Haunting of Pearson Place	Inspired by

=== Television ===
Executive producer

Year	Title	Notes
1985−86	Shadow Chasers	
1987−88	Ohara	
1988	Smart Guys	
1988	Poison	TV movie
1988	Mutts	TV movie
1997	Hiller and Diller	
1998−2000	Sports Night	
1998−2002	Felicity	
1999	Mulholland Dr.	TV pilot
1999−2001	The PJs	
2000	Thirty	TV movie
2000	Wonderland	
2000	Rat Bastard	TV movie
2001	The Beast	
2001	Silicon Follies	TV movie
2001−10	24	
2002	B.S.	TV movie
2003	The Snobs	TV movie
2003	The Break	TV movie
2003	Miss Match	
2003−19	Arrested Development	
2004	The Big House	
2005	Queen B	TV movie
2005	Fertile Ground	TV movie
2005−06	The Inside	
2006	Beyond	TV pilot
2007	24: Day Six - Debrief	
2007	Nice Girls Don't Get the Corner Office	TV movie
2006−08	Shark	
2006−11	Friday Night Lights	
2006−15	Curious George	
2008	24: Redemption	TV movie
2009	Maggie Hill	TV movie
2009−11	Lie to Me	
2010−12	Parenthood	
2011	Friends with Benefits	
2011	The Playboy Club	
2012	The Great Escape	
2012	Susan 313	TV movie
2013	How to Live with Your Parents (For the Rest of Your Life)	
2014	Those Who Kill	
2014	Gang Related	
2014	24: Live Another Day	
2015	The Bastard Executioner	
2015	WTF America	TV movie
2015	Problem Child	TV pilot
2015	Nerd Herd	TV movie
2015	The Clan of the Cave Bear	TV pilot
2015−17	Breakthrough	
2015−19	Empire	
2016	Chance	
2016−17	24: Legacy	
2016−18	Mars	
2017	Shots Fired	
2017−18	Genius	
2019	Peanuts in Space: Secrets of Apollo 10	TV short
2019–21	Why Women Kill	
2019	Wu-Tang: An American Saga	
2020	68 Whiskey	
2020	Filthy Rich	
2021	Swagger	
2021	Dan Brown's The Lost Symbol	
2021	The Ms. Pat Show	
2021	Genius: Aretha	
2022	Under the Banner of Heaven	
2022−25	The Tiny Chef Show	
2023	The Super Models	
2023	The Slumber Party	TV movie
2023−24	Bossy Bear	
2024	The Truth About Jim	
2024	I Am Not a Monster: The Lois Riess Murders	
2026	The 'Burbs	
2027	Wild Things	

Producer

Year	Title	Notes
1978	Zuma Beach	TV movie
1978	Thou Shalt Not Commit Adultery	TV movie
1988	Poison	
1998	From the Earth to the Moon	
1999	Student Affairs	TV movie
2005	The WIN Awards	TV special
2006	Treasure Hunters	Co-producer
2006	Misconceptions	
2007	Entourage	
2012	84th Academy Awards	TV special; Co-producer

As an actor

Year	Title	Role	Notes
1998	The Simpsons	Himself	Voice role
2007	Entourage	Himself	Uncredited
2008	The Simpsons	Himself	Voice role
2013	Arrested Development	Himself	
2017	This Is Us	Himself	
2024	Everybody's in LA	Himself	Uncredited
2026	Euphoria	Burt	1 episode

As writer

Year	Title	Notes
1985-86	Shadow Chasers	Co-created with Kenneth Johnson; Story with Johnson for episode "Pilot"

Thanks

Year	Title	Notes
2002	The Clint Howard Variety Show	Special thanks

== Additional awards ==
- 1998 – Emmy Award for Outstanding Miniseries for From the Earth to the Moon
- 2001 – Producers Guild of America's David O. Selznick Lifetime Achievement Award in Theatrical Motion Pictures
- 2003 – ShoWest Lifetime Achievement Award
- 2004 – Emmy Award for Outstanding Comedy Series for Arrested Development
- 2006 – Emmy Award for Outstanding Drama Series for 24
- 2007 – Named one of Time Magazine's "100 Most Influential People in the World"
- 2008 – Emmy Award for Outstanding Children's Animated Program for Curious George
- 2009 – Producers Guild of America Milestone Award, together with Ron Howard
- 2009 – New York University's Tisch School of the Arts Big Apple Award, together with Ron Howard
- 2010 – Simon Wiesenthal Center Humanitarian Award, together with Ron Howard
- 2010 – Emmy Award for Outstanding Children's Animated Program for Curious George
- 2011 – MPSE 2011 Filmmaker Award
- 2017 – Grammy Award for Best Music Film for The Beatles: Eight Days a Week
- 2019 – Atlantic Council Global Citizen Award
- 2022 – Honorary degree from USC
