= Hitman's Run =

- Home video cover art
- Directed by: Mark L. Lester
- Produced by: Brian R. Etting
- Starring: Eric Roberts
- Music by: Roger Bellon
- Release date: 1999
- Running time: 93 min.
- Country: United States
- Language: English

Hitman's Run is a 1999 film directed by Mark L. Lester.

== Plot ==
A former mob hitman, now in witness protection, is forced to come out of retirement when his family is threatened by his cohorts. He teams up with a skateboarding kid, who has a computer disk that the mob wants to get their hands on that has a list of new names for individuals in the FBI witness protection program. The list includes his dad, who separated from his mother years before and hadn't been seen since.

== Cast ==
- Eric Roberts as Tony Lazorka / John Dugan
- Esteban Powell as Brian Penny
- C. Thomas Howell as Tom Holly
- Farrah Forke as Sarah
- Michael D. Roberts as FBI Director Dean Harris
- Brent Huff as Randall Garrett
