= Reclaim (film) =

2014 film by Alan White

- Directed by: Alan White
- Written by: Carmine Gaeta; Luke Davies
- Produced by: Brian R. Etting; Josh Etting; Ian Sutherland; Robert Luketic; Gary Hamilton; Mike Gabrawy; Fredrik Malmberg; Silvio Muraglia; Meadow Williams
- Starring: John Cusack; Ryan Phillippe; Rachelle Lefevre; Luis Guzman; Jacki Weaver
- Cinematography: Scott Kevan
- Edited by: Doobie White; Scott D. Hanson
- Music by: Inon Zur
- Production companies: Grindstone Entertainment Group; Asia Tropical Films; Beijing Shuijing Shenlan International Media Co. Garlin Pictures; Paradox Entertainment; Arclight Films; Origin Productions; 120 dB Films; Reclaim Productions Pty. Ltd.
- Distributed by: Lionsgate
- Release date: September 19, 2014 (United States)
- Running time: 96 minutes
- Countries: China; Malaysia; United States
- Language: English

Reclaim is a 2014 American action thriller film directed by Alan White and starring John Cusack. The film was released on video on demand, with a simultaneous limited theatrical release in the United States, on September 19, 2014. Ryan Phillippe and Rachelle Lefevre play an American couple who travel to Puerto Rico to adopt an orphan (Briana Roy), and become entangled in a deadly scam.

== Plot ==
After a car accident that left her unable to have children, Shannon (Rachelle Lefevre) and her husband, Steven (Ryan Phillippe), decide to adopt a Haitian girl, Nina, orphaned after the 2010 earthquake, through the IRA (International Rescue Adoption), an organization run by Gabrielle Reigert (Jacki Weaver) and based in Puerto Rico. Having paid $60,000, the two move to a resort while they wait for Nina's United States passport to arrive. Steven takes an instant dislike to his neighbors, Benjamin (John Cusack), Salo (Jandres Burgos), and Paola (Veronica Faye Foo) especially after a misunderstanding with Salo at a bar, where he tells them about Nina, leads to a fight.

Two days after the adoption, the couple wake up to discover that Nina has disappeared. They begin their search and contact a police officer (Luis Guzmán) who tells them that their adoption documents are not recorded, while the IRA's headquarters in Old San Juan has been deserted. Steven admits that Reigert had demanded an additional $40,000 as part of the adoption cost, which he did not tell to Shannon beforehand. The officer then suggests that the IRA is a confidence scheme which offers orphans to unsuspecting couples in exchange for a hefty sum of money, only to take them away just a few days afterward. That night, Steven and Shannon are kidnapped by Benjamin and his aides, who reveal themselves to be child traffickers working for Reigert. Holding Nina, they force the couple to send their entire savings, which are largely compensation for the car accident that left them unable to conceive.

The next day, Steven heads to the bank at gunpoint to collect the savings. Having taken note that Benjamin's mansion was in Maunabo, he escapes from Salo back to the mansion with the money. Meanwhile, Shannon breaks free from her captivity, takes Nina, then distracts Paola long enough for Steven to take her gun and vehicle to facilitate his escape with his wife and Nina. They are pursued by Benjamin and Salo, though the latter is killed when a truck hits his car. After a chase, Benjamin crashes his car and is presumed dead, while the couple and Nina narrowly avoid falling from a steep cliff.

The three are escorted back by the officer, but he is killed by Benjamin who, having survived his crash, knocks Steven unconscious before taking them to Reigert's villa. A dispute regarding his share of the money causes Benjamin to shoot Reigert dead. Steven recovers and follows Benjamin, who chases Shannon into a decrepit building. Just before he is able to murder Shannon, Steven arrives and kills Benjamin. Nina then arrives, traumatized by the incident, picks up Benjamin’s gun and points it at Steven and Shannon. They manage to convince her to put it down and to live with them.

The film ends with a text showing the viewers that 1.2 million children are being trafficked each year with a quote: "They are invisible and they are everywhere."

== Cast ==
- John Cusack as Benjamin
- Ryan Phillippe as Steven Mayer - Father
- Rachelle Lefevre as Shannon Mayer - Mother
- Briana Roy as Nina - Haitian orphan
- Jacki Weaver as Gabrielle Reigert - Adoption director
- Luis Guzmán as Police Superintendent
- Jandres Burgos as Salo
- Veronica Faye Foo as Paola
- Alex Cintrón as Hotel Manager
- Millie Ruperto as Female Police Sergeant
- Luis Gonzaga as Police Detective
- Oscar H. Guerrero as Taxi Driver
- Reema Sampat as Interpreter
- Isabelle Adriani as Esmeralda - Bank Teller
- Sunshine Logroño as Mr. Alfonso Lopez -Bank Manager
- Sean Taylor as Gerry
- Blas Diaz as Walker

== Production ==
Plans to film Reclaim were announced in 2013 and White was set to direct the film, which was initially intended to take place in Australia. This was later changed after Screen Australia declined the film's investment pitch and the filming and setting was changed to take place in Puerto Rico. Filming took place in late 2013 over a period of 23 days, which Lefevre has described as "intense". Child actress Roy commented on her role, stating that she found the hardest part to be "speaking all the languages, French, Creole and English.“

== Reception ==
On review aggregator Rotten Tomatoes, the film holds an approval rating of 0% based on 10 reviews, with an average rating of 2.87/10. On Metacritic, the film has a weighted average score of 26 out of 100, based on 7 critics, indicating "generally unfavorable reviews". Much of the negative criticism centered around the film's plot, which many reviewers found too familiar and formulaic. Reviewers did praise the film's acting and scenery, with The Hollywood Reporter highlighting child star Brianna Roy out as a highlight. The Los Angeles Times criticized the movie for its script, writing "Carmine Gaeta and Luke Davies' screenplay is constructed from plot mechanics, and the emotional stakes grow less convincing with every twist of the screw."
