= Steel Arena (film) =

1973 film by Mark L. Lester

- Theatrical release poster
- Directed by: Mark L. Lester
- Written by: Mark L. Lester
- Produced by: Mark L. Lester; Peter S. Traynor
- Starring: Dusty Russell; Laura Brooks
- Cinematography: John Arthur Morrill
- Edited by: David Peoples
- Music by: Don Tweedy
- Production company: L-T Films Inc.
- Release date: April 1973
- Running time: 98 minutes
- Country: United States
- Language: English

Steel Arena is a 1973 American sports drama film written and directed by Mark L. Lester, in his feature film directorial debut. A precursor of the Burt Reynolds school of mainstream redneck films such as Smokey and the Bandit, the movie follows the fictionalized career of auto daredevil Dusty Russell as he develops into a world class stunt driver.

The fictional Dusty ties and then breaks the world record for the auto "dive bomber," a stunt where a stock car is driven at high speed off a ramp and over a measured space to come crashing down on top of parked junk cars. Russell actually was a world champion auto daredevil who set the dive bomber record while filming Steel Arena.

== Cast ==
Actor	Role
Dusty Russell	Himself
Buddy Love	Himself
Gene Drew	Himself
Dutch Schnitzler	Himself (a.k.a. "Atom Man")
Speed Stearns	Elaine Harper
Ed Ryan	Himself ("Chrome Dome")
Dan Carter	Himself
Bruce Mackey	Crash Chambers
Laura Brooks	Jo-Ann
Eric Nord	Southern Sheriff

== Plot ==
After being dropped off in front of a bar in a town in rural Kentucky, transient Dusty Russell goes into the bar but doesn't have the cash to pay for the drink he orders. The bartender offers him a job for $100 driving a "tanker", a souped up car for running bootleg moonshine. As Dusty prepares for the run, the police arrive at the still but Dusty manages to escape, eluding the local sheriff and state police in the bar owner/moonshiner's 1939 Dodge, which he rolls during his escape, destroying the 50 gallons of moonshine in the trunk. Coming back to the bar to collect him money, the bartender/moonshiner refuses to pay him and has his bouncers attack Dusty. A stranger joins the fight on Dusty's side and they escape the bar, along with Jo-Ann, a waitress Dusty has taken a fancy to. The stranger turns out to be Buddy Love and he intends to enter a demolition derby but lacks a car. Dusty offers to use the bootlegger's car he ran the moonshine in for the derby, and they become partners. Dusty and Jo-Ann become lovers.

Driving in the demolition derby, Dusty is the last car running and wins the purse of $300. The derby promoter, Gene Drew, turns out to be the head of an outfit of traveling auto daredevils, The Circus of Death, stunt drivers who perform stunts such as head-on collisions and the rolling-over of cars. One of the daredevils, an old German (Dutch Schnitzler, playing himself), does the Texas dynamite trick as "Atom Man", lying in a flimsy box that is blown up by dynamite.

Gene hires Dusty as well as his partner Buddy, and Dusty turns out to be a first-rate stunt driver. Dusty becomes famous on the auto daredevil circuit for the dive bomber, running a speeding car off of a ramp at 55 mph, flying through the air 50 feet, and crashing down on parked cars. The stunt driver Crash Chambers, who has taken an instant dislike to Dusty, becomes jealous as he is relegated to the secondary attraction of smashing through a flaming wooden wall with his head, as he lies on the hood of an automobile. Buddy Love performs "The Slide of Death", a stunt where he is dragged in a sitting position through a burning circle of gasoline, but dreams of moving up to stunt driving.

Dusty quickly develops into a record-breaking auto daredevil with his dive bomber stunt. Touring the state of Texas with the Circus of Death, Dusty ties the world record of 60 feet. At the celebration of his achievement in which Dusty is given a trophy, an inebriated Gene challenges Dusty to set a new record of 100 feet. A jealous Crash verbally attacks both Dusty and Gene, claiming that the trophy should be his, denouncing Dusty is a greenhorn whose success is a matter of luck. Gene calls Crash a coward, saying that even if Dusty's success is a matter of luck, he did the dive bomber stunt whereas Crash chickened out and refused to do it. His hatred on full boil, Crash challenges Dusty to a stunt driving feat mano a mano, in which they will try to drive the other off of the road. Dusty prevails when Crash's auto rolls over due to a blown tire.

Crash continues to irritate Circus of Death owner Gene, who threatens to fire him. During an event where Dusty is supposed to stage a head-in collision with another stunt driver, Buddy begs Dusty to let him drive the car, to prove himself to Drew. Crash knocks out the other driver and takes over the second auto, believing that he will be crashing head-on into the hated Dusty. Over the loudspeaker, Gene explains to the crowd of the dangers of staging a head-on crash, saying that the stunt requires teamwork as both drivers must obtain the same speed when they crash, because if one is going slower than the other, it increases the chances of a serious injury. Thinking Dusty and the other driver are in the cars, Gene comments that the car driven by Crash is going too fast and there might be trouble. Crash smashes into Dusty's car, and Buddy Love is killed.

As Dusty prepares to set a world record dive bomber jump of 70 feet, Crash sabotages him by cutting his safety belt. Dusty sets the world record but is injured in the stunt. Gene arranges for him to set a new auto dive bomber record of 100 feet after a short stay in hospital. Russell goes ahead with the stunt despite being injured and requiring clutches to make it to the event, and successfully extends his world record to 100 feet. However, upon landing in his auto on top of five parked cars, Dusty is injured and knocked unconscious. Dusty eventually dies of his injuries. In the final scene, Jo-Ann catches a Greyhound bus alone, and is in tears because of the tragedy as the credits roll.

== Production ==
Mark L. Lester saw Dusty Russell and the other stunt drivers who appear in the movie at an auto daredevils show in Berkeley, California, where they performed as The Circus of Death. Originally intending to make a documentary film about the Circus of Death on tour, Lester signed them up to star in a fictional story about auto daredevils. The actual drivers appeared as fictionalized versions of themselves and performed all their own stunts.

The movie, which was budgeted at $150,000, was shot in 21 days. Dusty Russell was credited as associate producer under his real name Robert Hanna.

The final stunt in the film, a 100-foot jump that Russell made and which his character dies performing, actually broke the world record, which it does in the film. Lester recalled "All the stunts were filmed at real events. They don't do those shows anymore. The vehicles they used were steel cars from the 60's. The cars today would collapse if they rolled over and crashed like in the movie."

Stunt driver Ed “Chromedome” Ryan was an escaped convict wanted for armed robbery, which was revealed after the film was released. He was arrested and the movie was shown to the inmates in the prison he was incarcerated in.

Lester recalled "It was a slice of Americana that I was trying to create out of that. Later I thought it was kind of a parable of America. The war in Vietnam was going on, and I thought this was like the gladiators of America - in cars."

== Distribution ==
The working title of Steel Arena was The Daredevil, but it was changed as another movie in production at the same time had the title. The movie was first released in the Atlanta metropolitan area in April 1973.

Mark L. Lester-Peter S. Traynor Productions did not officially submit Steel Arena for copyright at the time it was released, despite an on-screen copyright notice. Lester registered the copyright in 2002 by Mark L. Lester, under the number RE-862-134.

== Home media ==
The film was released on Blu-ray on December 31, 2018.

== See also ==
- List of American films of 1973
