= Broken (2006 film) =

2006 film by Alan White

- Official movie poster.
- Directed by: Alan White
- Written by: Jeff Lester; Drew Pillsbury
- Produced by: Brian R. Etting; Jerry Wayne
- Starring: Heather Graham; Jeremy Sisto
- Cinematography: Neil Shapiro
- Edited by: Jay Nelson
- Music by: Jeehun Hwang
- Distributed by: Truly Indie
- Release dates: November 4, 2006 (AFI Fest); May 10, 2007 (United States)
- Running time: 97 minutes
- Country: United States
- Language: English

Broken is a 2006 film by director Alan White, starring Heather Graham and Jeremy Sisto. The film had a limited run in theaters before being released to DVD.

== Plot ==
Hope (Heather Graham) is a night shift waitress who has made several mistakes in her life. She leaves Ohio for Los Angeles, trying to make a living as an entertainer. The film jumps back and forth between her arrival in LA to her present life as a waitress. She meets Will (Jeremy Sisto) when she gets to LA, and in the present he is desperate to win her back. They get involved with drugs. Hope realizes that she needs to break free from drugs, if she wishes to make her dream come true; so she cuts off all ties to Will. After leaving Will while Hope is working one day she meets Sara (Jessica Stroup) who comes in with two guys and after taking their order goes to the back with Sara following her. After catching up with Hope, it's revealed that Sara is on the same drugs that Hope used to take when she was with Will and that it's her first time on them. While Sara loves the feeling of the drugs and wants her and Hope to do more together it's at the two guy's house with her telling Hope that they are club owners. Sara reveals that she doesn't want to be alone and doesn't want to be with the guys anymore, saying that she will wait for Hope to get off working until she can come back with Sara to her place. As they talk Sara slowly starts hitting on Hope with her asking Hope if she has a boyfriend, when Hope says no Sara reveals that she has one and that she's considering breaking up with him, but that even if she doesn't she feels she has enough room in her heart to love more than one person and tries to kiss Hope. When Hope rejects her saying that she has to get back to work and leave her, Sara becomes embarrassed while calling herself stupid after which Hope tells her not to consider herself stupid. With that Sara slowly walks to Hope and they begin to have a lesbian make out session with Hope remembering her time having sex and doing drugs with Will. She goes back to her job, and speaks with others. Will, however, is prepared to go to any length to ensure that they stay together - even to the extent of committing murder, robbing her workplace and taking her hostage. Towards the end of the story, Hope is shown instead of her own regular customers, while one of the customers is the waitress.

== Cast ==
- Heather Graham as Hope
- Jeremy Sisto as Will
- Valerie Azlynn as Jessica
- Randall Batinkoff as Cliff
- James Brandon as Alex
- Jake Busey as Vince
- Scarlett Chorvat as Girl
- Chad Cunningham as David
- Kevin Daniels as Franklin
- Michael A. Goorjian as Thomas
- Linda Hamilton as Karen
- Tess Harper as Clare
- Joe Hursley as Rob
- Martin Kelly as Ethan
- Bianca Lawson as Mia
- Marc Lynn as Allen
- Billy Marti as Drug Dealer
- Navid Negahban as Keith
- Adam Nelson as Neal
- Peter Pasco as Nick
- Mark Sheppard as Malcolm
- Jessica Stroup as Sara
- Arthur Williams Jr. as The Cook

== Reception ==
On Rotten Tomatoes, it has a 12% approval rating based on 17 reviews, with an average score of 3.7/10.
