= Mark L. Lester =

American film director (born 1946)

- Born: November 26, 1946 (age 79); Cleveland, Ohio, U.S.
- Occupations: Film director, film producer, screenwriter
- Notable work: Roller Boogie; Class of 1984; Firestarter; Commando; Armed and Dangerous; Showdown in Little Tokyo

Mark L. Lester (born November 26, 1946) is an American film director, screenwriter, and producer. He is known as a prolific director of cult films, including the disco musical Roller Boogie (1979), the vigilante thriller film Class of 1984 (1982), the Stephen King adaptation Firestarter (1984), the Arnold Schwarzenegger action film Commando (1985), the action-comedy Armed and Dangerous (1986), starring John Candy, Eugene Levy, and Meg Ryan and the buddy movie Showdown in Little Tokyo (1991), starring Dolph Lundgren and Brandon Lee.

== Early life ==
Mark L. Lester was born 26 November 1946 in Cleveland, Ohio.

== Career ==
"Now people want to make films to get into festivals, we made films to get into drive-ins." - Mark L. Lester

After his debut in 1970 with the documentary film Twilight of the Mayas, Lester quickly became a prolific B-movie director/producer/writer, initially making his mark with a trio of road movies designed for the drive-in market: Steel Arena (1973), Truck Stop Women (1974), and Bobbie Jo and the Outlaw (1976). In 1977, he directed the high-concept thriller Stunts, an early outing for New Line Cinema, starring Robert Forster, Joanna Cassidy, and Richard Lynch, with a score composed by Michael Kamen.

In 1979, he capitalized on the disco trend with Roller Boogie, starring Linda Blair. The film had a significantly higher budget than his previous films and was the first to be distributed by a major studio, to modest success. While it received negative reviews upon its initial release, it has since gained cult status as a proverbial time capsule of the bygone Disco Era. In 1982, he made the exploitation action crime-thriller Class of 1984, a film revolving around violence in an inner-city school. The Canadian-made production, which featured an early appearance by Michael J. Fox, was controversial at the time of release.

"...many of my films have a revenge theme. It’s something I’ve only recently noticed, but revenge and conflict are elements that often return in my stories and the final act is usually the resolution of that conflict. I come from a very visual, not a word-based, way of conceiving films, and to me that resolution must articulate itself visually and in the most spectacular way possible. What you are underlining is essentially the manifestation of the character’s, or characters’, inner anger and frustration, which end up exploding. I think Class of 1984 (1982) is a perfect example of this." - Mark L. Lester (2021)

Lester entered the mainstream in 1984 with the Stephen King adaptation Firestarter.

I was at the "Midsummer Night’s Dream" Playboy Mansion party, sitting in my pajamas next to Joel Silver. He said he had this script, and maybe I could direct it. I said, "Fabulous, can I read the script? He said, "No, if you read the script you’re not gonna want to do the movie." - Mark L. Lester (2015)

Lester had his biggest hit the following year with Commando, a big-budget, Joel Silver-produced, Arnold Schwarzenegger action film that grossed over $57 million worldwide. In 1986, he directed and produced his first comedy, Armed and Dangerous, starring John Candy, Eugene Levy and Meg Ryan. In 1986, he formed Original Pictures, replacing his original production company Mark L. Lester Pictures, he had earlier established in the late 1970s, and had five films planned, source from the work of public domain with a $66 million budget.

In 1987, via Mark Lester Films, he signed with upstart film production company Davis Entertainment for the production of $5–10 million action films, which Davis produced, Lester directed and independently funded by two independent studios. 70% of each pictures could be obtained for presale use. In 1990, he directed Class of 1999, a semi-sequel to Class of 1984, starring Malcolm McDowell, Pam Grier, and Stacy Keach. In 1991, he directed the cult classic Showdown in Little Tokyo, starring Dolph Lundgren and Brandon Lee.

Lester also founded American World Pictures, an independent production and distribution company. Other films include the thrillers Hitman's Run (1999) and Blowback (2000), and the TV movie Pterodactyl (2005), produced for the Sci Fi Channel. In 2012, he formed a new distribution company called Titan Global Entertainment.

In January 2013, almost ten years after directing his last picture, Lester helmed the film Poseidon Rex on location in Belize. The production was disrupted briefly when lead actor Corin Nemec was severely injured during a boating accident while the Belizean Coast Guard was transporting the cast to set. Nemec was later replaced by Charmed co-star Brian Krause.

A critic describes his career as having an exploitation period, a commercial period and a DTV period.

== Personal life ==
On 14 March 1992, Lester married Dana Dubovsky, with whom he had two children: Jason and Justin. The couple divorced in 2010. Lester has a daughter from a prior relationship, Janessa (James) Lester, who is a musician and singer-songwriter.

== Filmography ==
=== Film ===
Director

Year	Title	Director	Producer	Writer
1971	Twilight of the Mayas	Yes	Yes	No
1973	Steel Arena	Yes	Yes	Yes
1974	Truck Stop Women	Yes	Yes	Yes
1975	White House Madness	Yes	Yes	No
1976	Bobbie Jo and the Outlaw	Yes	Yes	No
1977	Stunts	Yes	No	No
1979	Roller Boogie	Yes	No	No
1982	Class of 1984	Yes	Executive	Yes
1984	Firestarter	Yes	No	No
1985	Commando	Yes	No	No
1986	Armed and Dangerous	Yes	No	No
1990	Class of 1999	Yes	Yes	Story
1991	Showdown in Little Tokyo	Yes	Yes	No
1993	Extreme Justice	Yes	No	No
1995	Night of the Running Man	Yes	Yes	No
1998	Double Take	Yes	Yes	No
1998	Misbegotten	Yes	Yes	No
1999	Hitman's Run	Yes	Yes	No
2000	Blowback	Yes	Yes	No
2003	Betrayal	Yes	Yes	No
2003	Stealing Candy	Yes	Yes	Story
2003	White Rush	Yes	Yes	No
2010	Groupie	Yes	Executive	No
2013	Poseidon Rex	Yes	Yes	No
2014	Dragons of Camelot	Yes	Yes	No

Executive producer

- The Funhouse (1981)
- Instinct to Kill (2001)
- Bad Karma (2002)
- The Wisher (2002)
- Day of Wrath (2006)
- Jurassic Attack (2013)
- Toxin (2015)
- The Gardener (2020)

Producer

- Tricia's Wedding (1971) (Short film)
- Devil's Prey (2001)
- Beauty and the Beast (2009)
- Sand Sharks (2012)
- Social Animals (2018)
- High Resolution (2018)
- Sleeping With My Student (2019)

=== Direct-to-video ===
Year	Title	Director	Producer
1996	Public Enemies	Yes	Yes
1997	The Ex	Yes	Yes
1999	The Base	Yes	Yes
2000	The Base 2: Guilty as Charged	Yes	Yes

=== TV movies ===
Year	Title	Director	Producer
1979	Gold of the Amazon Women	Yes	No
2000	Sacrifice	Yes	Yes
2004	Pterodactyl	Yes	Yes
2007	Wraiths of Roanoke	No	Yes
2011	Sinbad and the Minotaur	No	Yes
2011	Jabberwock	No	Yes

Executive producer

- Yeti: Curse of the Snow Demon (2008) (Also story writer)
- Dragonwasps (2012)
