= Ron Howard filmography =

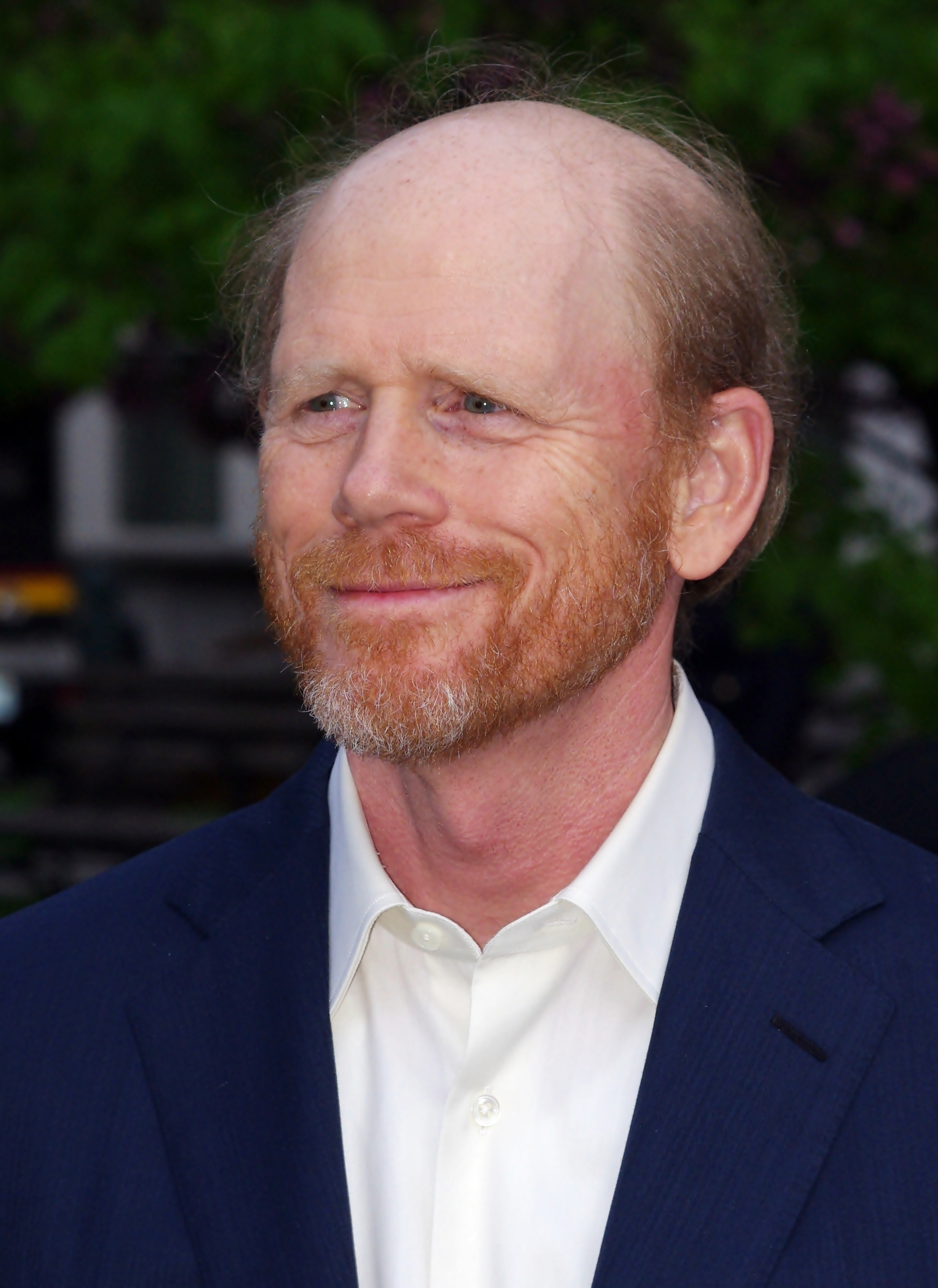
Howard in 2011

Ron Howard is an American director, producer, screenwriter, and actor.

He started his career portraying Opie, the son of Andy Taylor (played by Andy Griffith) in the sitcom The Andy Griffith Show from 1960 through 1968 and Richie Cunningham in the sitcom Happy Days, a role he would play from 1974 to 1980. During this time, he also acted in films such as The Music Man (1962), American Graffiti (1973), and The Shootist (1976). Howard retired from acting in 1980.

He then shifted into directing comedies such as Night Shift (1982), Splash (1984), and Cocoon (1985) as well as the fantasy Willow (1988), the dramedy Parenthood (1989), the thriller Backdraft (1991), and the newspaper film The Paper (1994). He then transitioned into directing critically acclaimed dramas such as Apollo 13 (1995), A Beautiful Mind (2001), Cinderella Man (2005), Frost/Nixon (2008), Rush (2013), and In the Heart of the Sea (2015). Howard also directed the children's film How the Grinch Stole Christmas (2000) as well as the Robert Langdon film series, The Da Vinci Code (2006), Angels & Demons (2009), Inferno (2016), and Solo: A Star Wars Story (2018). He has also directed the documentary films The Beatles: Eight Days a Week (2016) and Pavarotti (2019).

== Film ==
=== Feature film ===
Year	Title	Director	Producer	Writer	Ref.
1977	Grand Theft Auto	Yes	No	Yes	
1982	Night Shift	Yes	No	No	
1984	Splash	Yes	No	No	
1985	Cocoon	Yes	No	No	
1986	Gung Ho	Yes	Executive	No	
1988	Willow	Yes	No	No	
1989	Parenthood	Yes	No	Story	
1991	Backdraft	Yes	No	No	
1992	Far and Away	Yes	Yes	Story	
1994	The Paper	Yes	No	No	
1995	Apollo 13	Yes	No	No	
1996	Ransom	Yes	No	No	
1999	EDtv	Yes	Yes	No	
2000	How the Grinch Stole Christmas	Yes	Yes	No	
2001	A Beautiful Mind	Yes	Yes	No	
2003	The Missing	Yes	Yes	No	
2005	Cinderella Man	Yes	Yes	No	
2006	The Da Vinci Code	Yes	Yes	No	
2008	Frost/Nixon	Yes	Yes	No	
2009	Angels & Demons	Yes	Yes	No	
2011	The Dilemma	Yes	Yes	No	
2013	Rush	Yes	Yes	No	
2015	In the Heart of the Sea	Yes	Yes	No	
2016	Inferno	Yes	Yes	No	
2018	Solo: A Star Wars Story	Yes	No	No	
2020	Hillbilly Elegy	Yes	Yes	No	
2022	Thirteen Lives	Yes	Yes	No	
2024	Eden	Yes	Yes	Story	
2027	Alone at Dawn	Yes	Yes	No	

=== Short film ===
Year	Title	Director	Producer	Actor	Role	Notes
1969	Old Paint	No	Yes	No		Credited as Ronny Howard
1969	Deed of Daring-Do	No	Yes	No		Credited as Ronny Howard
1969	Cards, Cads, Guns, Gore and Death	No	Yes	No		Credited as Ronny Howard
2011	The Death and Return of Superman	No	No	Yes	Max's Son	
2011	When You Find Me	Yes	No	No		

=== Producer only ===
- Clean and Sober (1988)
- The Chamber (1996)
- Inventing the Abbotts (1997)
- The Alamo (2004)
- Curious George (2006)
- Changeling (2008)
- Restless (2011)
- Cowboys & Aliens (2011)
- The Good Lie (2014)
- The Dark Tower (2017)
- Tick, Tick... Boom! (2021)
- The Beanie Bubble (2023)
- Spaceballs: The New One (2027)

=== Executive producer only ===
- Leo and Loree (1980)
- No Man's Land (1987)
- Vibes (1988)
- The 'Burbs (1989)
- The Doors (1991) (Uncredited)
- Closet Land (1991)
- Curious George 2: Follow That Monkey! (2010)
- Curious George 3: Back to the Jungle (2015)
- Backdraft 2 (2019)
- Wedding Season (2022)

=== Acting roles ===
Year	Title	Role	Notes
1956	Frontier Woman	Bit Part	Uncredited
1959	The Journey	Billy Rhinelander	Credited as Ronny Howard
1961	Five Minutes to Live	Bobby	Credited as Ronnie Howard
1962	The Music Man	Winthrop Paroo	Credited as Ronny Howard
1963	The Courtship of Eddie's Father	Eddie	Credited as Ronny Howard
1965	Village of the Giants	Genius	
1969	Land of the Giants	Jodar	
1970	The Wild Country	Virgil Tanner	
1973	American Graffiti	Steve Bolander	
1973	Happy Mother's Day, Love George	Johnny	
1974	The Spikes Gang	Les Richter	
1976	The First Nudie Musical	Auditioning actor	Uncredited
1976	Eat My Dust!	Hoover Niebold	
1976	The Shootist	Gillom Rogers	
1977	Grand Theft Auto	Sam Freeman	
1979	More American Graffiti	Steve Bolander	
1982	Night Shift	Annoying Sax Player; Boy Making Out with Girlfriend	Uncredited cameos
1998	Welcome to Hollywood	Himself	
2000	The Independent	Himself	
2000	How the Grinch Stole Christmas	Whoville Townsperson	Uncredited
2001	Osmosis Jones	Tom Colonic	Voice role
2011	From Up on Poppy Hill	Philosophy Club's president	Voice role
2016	Donald Trump's The Art of the Deal: The Movie	Himself	
2022	Scream	Principal Himbry (Stab)	Uncredited – image appearance

=== Documentary film ===
Year	Title	Director	Producer	Himself
1992	The Magical World of Chuck Jones	Yes	No	Yes
1998	One Vision	No	No	Yes
1999	Beyond the Mat	No	Yes	No
2004	Tell Them Who You Are	No	No	Yes
2005	Inside Deep Throat	No	uncredited	No
2007	In the Shadow of the Moon	No	No	Yes
2012	Katy Perry: Part of Me	No	Yes	No
2013	Made in America	Yes	No	Yes
2016	The Beatles: Eight Days a Week	Yes	Yes	No
2019	Pavarotti	Yes	Yes	No
2019	Dads	No	Yes	Yes
2020	Rebuilding Paradise	Yes	Yes	No
2020	Breakthrough: Virus Fighters	Yes	Yes	No
2021	Paper & Glue	No	Yes	No
2021	Julia	No	Yes	No
2022	Lucy and Desi	No	Yes	No
2022	We Feed People	Yes	Yes	No
2024	Jim Henson Idea Man	Yes	Yes	No
2024	Music by John Williams	No	Yes	Yes
2025	Barbara Walters: Tell Me Everything	No	Yes	No
2026	Avedon	Yes	Yes	No

== Television ==
Year	Title	Director	Executive producer	Writer	Notes
1978	Cotton Candy	Yes	No	Yes	TV movie
1980	Skyward	Yes	Yes	No	TV movie
1981	Through the Magic Pyramid	Yes	Yes	No	TV movie
1983	Little Shots	Yes	Yes	No	TV movie
2017	Genius	Yes	Yes	No	Pilot episode

=== Producer only ===
Year	Title	Notes
1998	From the Earth to the Moon	Miniseries
1999	Student Affairs	TV movie
2000	Wonderland	
2015–present	Breakthrough	

=== Executive producer ===
Year	Title	Notes
1981	Skyward Christmas	TV movie
1983	When Your Lover Leaves	TV movie
1984–1985	Maximum Security	
1985	No Greater Gift	TV special
1985	Into Thin Air	TV movie
1986	The Lone-Star Kid	TV movie
1987	Take Five	TV movie
1988	Poison	TV movie
1999	Mulholland Drive	TV movie
1990–1991	Parenthood	
1998–2000	Sports Night	
1998–2002	Felicity	
1999–2001	The PJs	
2000	Silicon Follies	TV movie
2001	The Beast	
2003	The Snobs	
2003–2006, 2013, 2018–2019	Arrested Development	
2006–2022	Curious George	
2010–2015	Parenthood	
2012	The Great Escape	
2014	Unsung Heroes	TV documentary
2016–2018	Mars	
2020	68 Whiskey	
2021	Crime Scene: The Vanishing at the Cecil Hotel	Documentary series
2021	Crime Scene: The Times Square Killer	Documentary series
2022	Under the Banner of Heaven	
2022	Light & Magic	Documentary series
2022	Willow	
2022–2025	The Tiny Chef Show	
2023	The Super Models	Documentary series
2023	The Slumber Party	TV movie
2023–2024	Bossy Bear	
2024	The Truth About Jim	Documentary series
2024	I Am Not a Monster: The Lois Riess Murders	Documentary series
2025	Pets	

=== Acting roles ===
Year	Title	Role	Notes
1959	Johnny Ringo	Ricky Parrot	Episode: "The Accused"
1959	Five Fingers	—N/a	Episode: "Station Break"
1959	The Twilight Zone	Wilcox Boy	Episode: "Walking Distance"
1959	The DuPont Show with June Allyson	Wim Wegless	Episode: "Child Lost"
1959	Dennis the Menace	Stewart	6 episodes
1959	The Many Loves of Dobie Gillis	Various roles	4 episodes
1959	General Electric Theater	Barnaby Baxter/Randy	2 episodes:
1959	Hennesey	Walker	Episode: "The Baby Sitter"
1960	The Danny Thomas Show	Opie Taylor	Episode: "Danny Meets Andy Griffith"
1960	Cheyenne	Timmy	Episode: "Counterfeit Gun," uncredited
1960	Pete and Gladys	Tommy	Episode: "The Goat Story"
1960–1968	The Andy Griffith Show	Opie Taylor	Series regular, 243 episodes Credited as Ronny Howard
1962	Route 66	Chet Duncan	Episode: "Poor Little Kangaroo Rat"
1962	The New Breed	Tommy Simms	Episode: "So Dark the Night"
1963	The Eleventh Hour	Barry Stewart	Episode: "Is Mr. Martian Coming Back?"
1964	The Great Adventure	Daniel Waterhouse	Episode: "Plague"
1964	Dr. Kildare	Jerry Prentice	Episode: "A Candle in the Window"
1964	The Fugitive	Gus	Episode: "Cry Uncle"
1965	The Big Valley	Tommy	Episode: "Night of the Wolf"
1966	Gomer Pyle, U.S.M.C.	Opie Taylor	Episode: "Opie Joins the Marines"
1966	I Spy	Alan Loden	Episode: "Little Boy Lost"
1967	The Monroes	Timothy Prescott	Episode: "Teaching the Tiger to Purr"
1967	Gentle Ben	Jody Cutler	Episode: "Green-Eyed Bear"
1968	Mayberry R.F.D.	Opie Taylor	Episode: "Andy and Helen Get Married"
1968	The Archie Show	Archie Andrews	Early Pilot Cartoon
1968	The F.B.I.	Jess Orkin	Episode: "The Runaways"
1968	Lancer	Turk Caudle/Willy	2 episodes
1969	Judd for the Defense	Phil Beeton	Episode: "Between the Dark and the Daylight"
1969	Daniel Boone	Luke	Episode: "A Man Before His Time"
1969	Gunsmoke	Jamie	Episode: "Charlie Noon"
1969	Land of the Giants	Jodar	Episode: "Genius At Work"
1970	Smoke	Chris	TV movie
1970	Headmaster	Tony Landis	Season 1 - Episode 6
1970	Lassie	Gary	Episode: "Gary Here Comes Glory!" Part 1 & 2
1971–1972	The Smith Family	Bob Smith	
1972	Love, American Style	Richard "Richie" Cunningham	Episode: "Love and the Happy Days"
1972	The Bold Ones: The New Doctors	Cory Merlino	Episode: "Discovery at Fourteen"
1972	Bonanza	Ted Hoag	Episode: "The Initiation"
1973	M*A*S*H	Private Walter; Wendell Peterson	Episode: "Sometimes You Hear the Bullet"
1974	The Waltons	Seth Turner	Episode: "The Gift"
1974–1984	Happy Days	Richard "Richie" Cunningham	Main role (Seasons 1-7); Guest role (season 11)
1974	Locusts	Donny Fletcher	TV movie
1974	The Migrants	Lyle Barlow	TV movie
1975	Huckleberry Finn	Huckleberry Finn	TV movie
1975–1981	Insight	Connie/Joe	2 episodes
1976	Laverne & Shirley	Richie Cunningham	2 episodes
1976	I'm a Fool	Andy	TV movie
1980	The Fonz and the Happy Days Gang	Richie Cunningham	Voice role, Episode: "King for a Day"
1980	Act of Love	Leon Cybulkowski	TV movie
1981	Bitter Harvest	Ned De Vries	TV movie
1981	Fire on the Mountain	Lee Mackie	TV movie
1983	When Your Lover Leaves	—N/a	TV movie, Uncredited
1986	Return to Mayberry	Opie Taylor	TV movie
1988	Channel 99	Himself	TV movie
1998–1999	The Simpsons	Himself	Voice role, 2 episodes
1999	Frasier	Stephen	Voice role, Episode: "Good Samaritan"
2003–2006, 2013, 2018–2019	Arrested Development	Narrator (voice only); Self (8 episodes)	Series Regular, all seasons, uncredited; voice role Credited as Guest Star, 8 episodes across Seasons 3-5
2016	The Odd Couple	Stanley	Episode: "Taffy Days"
2017	This Is Us	Himself	3 episodes
2024	Only Murders in the Building	Himself	Episode: "Escape From Planet Klongo"
2025	The Studio	Himself	Episode: "The Note"

== See also ==
- Ron Howard's unrealized projects
