= Ron Howard's unrealized projects =

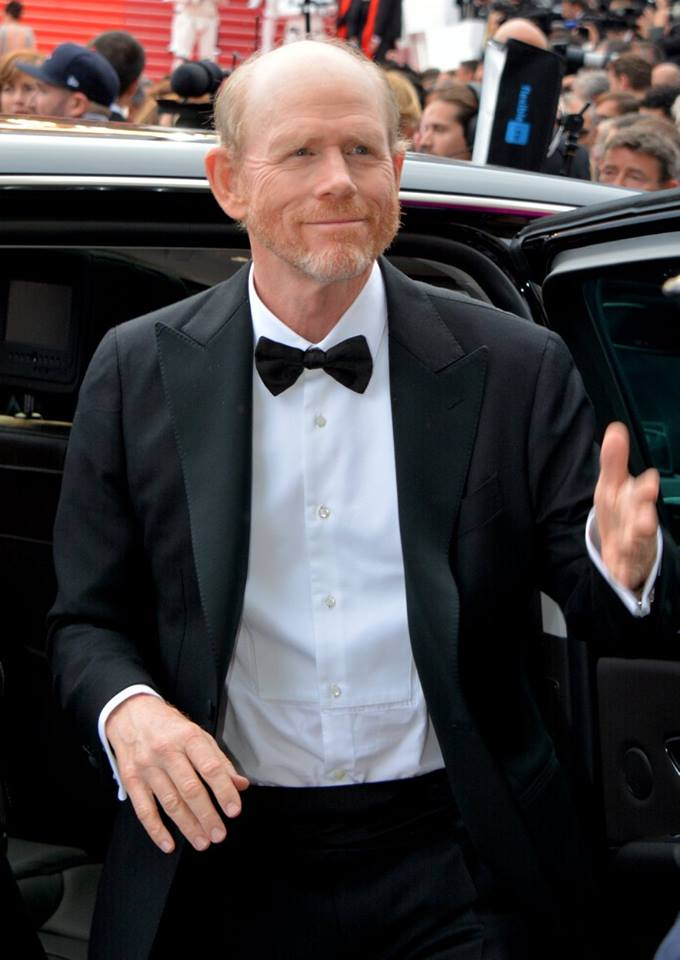
Howard arriving at the 2018 Cannes Film Festival

During his long career, American film director Ron Howard has worked on several projects which never progressed beyond the pre-production stage under his direction. Some of these projects fell in development hell, were officially cancelled, were in development limbo or would see life under a different production team.

== 1980s ==
=== Rainbow Warrior ===
In the early 1980s, Howard planned to make a film surrounding the events of Greenpeace and their ship the Rainbow Warrior. "That ship had been impounded and captured by Spain, and I wanted to do a movie about that, and their escape," Howard later said. "I couldn't get it off the ground." He later fulfilled his ambitions to make a movie set in the ocean with 2015's In the Heart of the Sea.

=== Untitled Doors biopic ===
In September 1987, the Los Angeles Times reported that Howard and Brian Grazer's Imagine Entertainment picked up the rights to the Jim Morrison story from Columbia Pictures, with plans to develop it into a film within the next five months. Grazer stated Howard might direct the film, but that a firm decision would not be made until a new script—to be penned by Ralph Thomas—was completed. Co-producer Sasha Harari estimated the film's cost as $8–12 million, and said that original Doors music would be used in the soundtrack but there would only be two or three major concert scenes. Other directors who pursued making a film about Morrison throughout the 1980s included Brian De Palma, Martin Scorsese, William Friedkin, Walter Hill, Paul Schrader, Barry Levinson and Francis Ford Coppola, before Oliver Stone made the eventual 1991 biopic.

=== Superman IV: The Quest for Peace ===
Howard was offered the opportunity to direct Superman IV: The Quest for Peace by Christopher Reeve, but The Cannon Group, Inc. hired Sidney J. Furie to direct instead.

== 1990s ==
=== The Postman ===
In the early 1990s, producer Wendy Finerman was developing The Postman for Howard to direct, with Eric Roth writing the script and Tom Hanks set to star. However, they were all booted off the project when Kevin Costner took over.

=== Hep ===
In January 1993, among the projects Imagine Entertainment were developing was Hep, a "stylish, 1960s detective piece" conceived by Howard about a "slick" L.A. private eye who must solve his partner's murder. Rockne O'Bannon was writing the screenplay based on Howard's idea., John Byrum was hired to rewrite O'Bannon's script. The project was later retitled Johnny Diamond, and Scott Rosenberg was brought on to pen a full rewrite of the script, with William Goldman overseeing the rewrite. The film was never made, with Howard nor with another director attached.

=== Clipped ===
In July 1993, it was reported that Howard was developing a pitch called Clipped for his Imagine Entertainment production banner, which was being eyed as a vehicle for Steve Martin. Howard described it as "a contemporary comedy which explores the human psyche in an entertaining and exciting way. A guy gets a paper clip stuck in his brain, and as it moves around, it stimulates different lobes of his brain, whether it's his willpower, or his ability to censor." Charlie Peters was to write the script.

=== Into Thin Air ===
In 1995, after Apollo 13, Howard was said to be interested in directing two thrillers as his next films; Ransom, and the Henry Bean-scripted project Into Thin Air. The latter was an action thriller about the Witness Protection Program. By 1997, Lili Fini Zanuck had become attached to direct Into Thin Air, with Sylvester Stallone in the leading role. He soon dropped out.

=== Star Wars: Episode I – The Phantom Menace ===
In the 1990s, Howard was one of three directors, including Robert Zemeckis and Steven Spielberg, in talks with George Lucas to direct Star Wars: Episode I – The Phantom Menace, which Howard revealed on a 2015 episode of the Happy, Sad Confused podcast, stating that he found the offer too daunting. Lucas eventually ended up directing the film.

=== Dark Horse ===
In 1996, Howard was attached to direct John Travolta in a film called Dark Horse which allegedly follows a politician running for President who'll stop at nothing to get what he wants. The project languished in development hell.

=== The Secret Life of Walter Mitty ===
In July 1997, it was reported that New Line Cinema was in talks with Howard to direct a new adaptation of James Thurber's short story "The Secret Life of Walter Mitty", with Jim Carrey attached to star in the lead role.

=== The Pretenders ===
In October 1997, it was reported that Howard had shown interest in directing The Pretenders, a Western epic with a contemporary edge, that told a story of greed and corruption among the powerful robber barons of 1873 San Francisco. Eric Warren Singer wrote the screenplay, with Matthew McConaughey and Brad Pitt in talks to play cousins who make a trek west to San Francisco from their Kentucky home, in a pairing said to be reminiscent of Butch Cassidy and the Sundance Kid.

=== Laws of Madness ===
In March 1998,

=== The Sea Wolf ===
In June 1998, Howard was attached to direct a film version of Jack London's The Sea Wolf for Columbia Pictures, from a screenplay by David Koepp, with Nicolas Cage in the starring role. The project was abandoned as Howard felt it was "too expensive and the cast didn't come together in a way that I felt was right for the movie." The following year, John Boorman signed on to direct the adaptation.

=== Golden Gate ===
In July 1998, Imagine Entertainment was developing the romantic drama Golden Gate with Howard directing, and set to star Bill Paxton. The script was written by Will Richter and Audrey Wells.

=== Harry Potter and the Philosopher's Stone ===
Howard was one of several directors approached to do Harry Potter and the Philosopher's Stone in the late 1990s, but he rejected the offer as he had just completed production on How the Grinch Stole Christmas and did not want to do another fantasy film.

== 2000s ==
=== Some Like It Hot remake ===
In the early 2000s, Howard had been set to direct a remake of Billy Wilder's classic comedy Some Like It Hot with Scarlett Johansson, Ashton Kutcher, and Shia LaBeouf in Marilyn Monroe, Tony Curtis, and Jack Lemmon's roles, respectively.

=== Bay of Pigs ===
In October 2000, screenwriter Shane Salerno was reportedly writing the historical drama Bay of Pigs for Howard to direct, and produce alongside Brian Grazer and Todd Hallowell for Imagine Entertainment and Universal Pictures.

=== The Serpent and the Eagle ===
In September 2002, Howard was set to produce and possibly direct Hans Beimler and Robert Wolfe's historical drama The Serpent and the Eagle about the relationship between Hernán Cortés and El Malinchi, for Universal Pictures.

=== B-Major ===
In December 2002, it was reported that Howard's directing vehicle, B-Major, had brought on Mark Leyner to perform rewrites on its script. Set in Scranton, Pennsylvania in 1970, the premise follows a discouraged young singer and his pal—an alcoholic pianist—who venture to break the record for marathon piano playing.

=== Untitled Eric Sevareid biopic ===
In September 2003, Revolution Studios acquired a pitch based on the life of reporter and news analyst Eric Sevareid, with Howard attached to direct and Imagine Entertainment to produce. Stephen Falick and Jeff Howard were to write the film, which would follow the "dramatic and comedic elements" of Sevareid's life after he was recruited by Edward R. Murrow to cover World War II.

=== Last Man Home ===
In March 2006, Howard was set to direct Jamie Moss' first Gulf War spec script Last Man Home, about a soldier on a covert mission to find his AWOL brother, with Brian Grazer set to produce and Universal Pictures set to distribute the film.

=== The Look of Real ===
In April 2006, Howard became attached to direct The Look of Real, an ensemble film written by Winnie Holzman about a group of young women in the garment industry. He reportedly wanted to cast his daughter Bryce in an unspecified role. Brian Grazer was set to produce the film through Imagine Entertainment, with Universal Pictures distributing.

=== Caché remake ===
In February 2007, Howard was set to direct and produce the American remake of Michael Haneke's psychological thriller Caché with Plum Pictures attached to produce and Universal Pictures to distribute.

=== The Emperor's Children ===
In July 2007, Howard was set to direct and produce the film adaptation of Claire Messud's novel The Emperor's Children with Noah Baumbach writing the script and Universal Pictures set to distribute the film. But in 2010, with Howard opting instead to direct The Dilemma, Baumbach replaced him as director, with Eric Bana, Keira Knightley and Richard Gere attached to star. This production failed to materialize, and in 2014, Lake Bell became attached to direct, replacing Baumbach.

=== Untitled Bill Hicks biopic ===
Around 2008, Cinderella Man star Russell Crowe was heavily involved in developing a biographical film about the late comedian Bill Hicks, with reports suggesting interest in having Howard direct. When questioned as to the status of the Howard/Crowe project, American: The Bill Hicks Story co-director Matt Harlock responded, "No they didn't contact us, their project has gone a bit quiet".

=== The Strange Adventures of H.P. Lovecraft ===
In March 2009, Howard was set to produce and possibly direct the film adaptation of Mac Carter and Jeff Blitz's graphic novel The Strange Adventures of H.P. Lovecraft with Carter writing the script and Universal Pictures set to distribute.

== 2010s ==
=== My Stroke of Insight ===
In October 2010, Howard was set to direct and produce the film adaptation of neuroanatomist Jill Bolte Taylor's memoir My Stroke of Insight for Sony Pictures, with Semi Chellas writing the script. Howard was reported as wanting Jodie Foster to star in the film.

=== Amnesty ===
In April 2011, it was reported that Howard was set to produce and direct Max Landis' fantasy spy pitch Amnesty for Universal Pictures.

=== Spy vs. Spy ===
In June 2011, Howard was set to direct the film adaptation of the comic strip Spy vs. Spy with David Koepp writing the script. By 2020, Rawson Marshall Thurber took over as both director and writer, with Howard attached as a producer only.

=== Under the Banner of Heaven ===
In July 2011, it was reported that Howard was set to direct a film adaptation of Jon Krakauer's 2003 novel Under the Banner of Heaven for Warner Bros., which eventually became the Hulu miniseries of the same name, for which Howard served as an executive producer.

=== 364 ===
In September 2011, it was reported that Howard was set to produce and direct David Guggenheim's superhero drama script 364 about a guy with superpowers one day every year for Universal Pictures.

=== The Imitation Game ===
In October 2011, it was reported that Howard was interested in directing Graham Moore's script The Imitation Game, with Leonardo DiCaprio in talks to star as Alan Turing. Morten Tyldum would end up directing the film with Benedict Cumberbatch portraying Turing instead.

=== Doc Holiday TV pilot ===
In November 2011, it was reported that Howard was set to direct the pilot episode of Akiva Goldsman's biographical Western series based on Mary Doria Russell's novel Doc, written by Adam Cooper and Bill Collage for HBO.

=== Conquest TV series ===
In July 2012, it was reported that Howard was set to direct and produce through Imagine Entertainment José Rivera's historical Aztec series Conquest for Showtime.

=== All I've Got ===
On January 17, 2013, Howard was set to direct the film All I've Got, after J. J. Abrams left to write and direct Star Wars Episode VII: The Force Awakens. In 2016, the film was retitled Kolma, with Marielle Heller taking over directing duties from Howard and Daisy Ridley attached to star.

=== The Graveyard Book ===
On January 22, 2013, Howard was set to direct the film adaptation of Neil Gaiman's novel The Graveyard Book for Walt Disney Pictures. In 2022, Marc Forster signed on to direct the adaptation.

=== Mena aka American Made ===
On February 8, 2014, it was reported that Howard was set to direct Gary Spinelli's script Mena about drug trafficker Barry Seal for Universal Pictures, which eventually became the Doug Liman film American Made, starring Tom Cruise.

=== The Jungle Book ===
On February 14, 2014, it was reported that Howard was set to direct an adaptation of Rudyard Kipling's 1894 classic The Jungle Book for Warner Bros., which eventually became the Andy Serkis film Mowgli: Legend of the Jungle.

=== The Truth About the Harry Quebert Affair ===
In April 2014, it was reported that Howard was set to direct a film adaptation of Joël Dicker's 2014 novel The Truth About the Harry Quebert Affair for Warner Bros. The novel was instead adapted into a miniseries through Epix.

=== The Girl Before ===
In 2015, it was reported that Howard was attached to direct the film adaptation of J. P. Delaney's novel The Girl Before and produce through Imagine Entertainment. The novel was instead adapted for television, without the involvement of Howard.

=== Pinocchio ===
In February 2016, it was reported that Howard was possibly going to direct an adaptation of Pinocchio with Robert Downey Jr. set to produce and portray Geppetto.

=== Zelda ===
In October 2016, it was reported that Howard was possibly going to direct Emma Frost's script Zelda about the socialite Zelda Fitzgerald with Jennifer Lawrence set to produce and portray Zelda.

=== The Warehouse ===
In April 2018, it was reported that Imagine Entertainment had won the film rights to the Rob Hart novel The Warehouse, with plans to develop the project for Howard to direct.

=== Canary ===
In June 2018, it was announced that Imagine Entertainment had acquired the rights to produce screenwriter Zach Dean's pitch Canary, a female-led science fiction story, with the intention of developing the project as a directing vehicle for Howard.

=== The Shrinking of Treehorn ===
In 2019, Howard was announced as director of his first animated film The Shrinking of Treehorn, based on the children's book by Florence Parry Heide. Paramount Pictures was to release the film, planned to be the first in a series of live action/animated productions through Imagine Entertainment.

== 2020s ==
=== The Fixer ===
In January 2020, Paramount Pictures set Howard to direct and produce The Fixer, a political thriller about a failed assassination attempt on Fidel Castro for Paramount Pictures.

=== Untitled Lang Lang biopic ===
In September 2020, Howard was announced to direct a film biopic of Chinese pianist Lang Lang, written by Michele Mulroney and Kieran Mulroney based on his memoir Journey of a Thousand Miles. Howard planned for it to be his next film after Thirteen Lives.

=== Willow season 2 ===
In 2023, Howard—who made the original Willow—expressed interest in directing episodes of the Disney+ revival series if renewed for a second season. Though a follow-up never ultimately occurred, he did serve as an executive producer on the first season and was highly involved in the show's overall development.

=== Untitled firefighter film ===
In June 2025, journalist Jeff Sneider reported that Howard would direct Glen Powell in an untitled film, scripted by Christina Hodson, for Amazon MGM Studios. It centers on an elite group of firefighters who "must rekindle their fractured relationship when a series of deadly fires sweep across Texas."

=== Untitled sci-fi fantasy film ===
In an August 2025 interview published by Vulture, Howard expressed interest in making a contemporary sci-fi fantasy project, revealing that he was "dying to find" and "actively searching" for a script with the tone and style of the film Big Fish. "I love doing movies based on real events, but that pushes the aesthetic of the film into a more naturalistic vein," added Howard. "And if I could find a good fantasy where I connected with the themes and the character, it would open the door to something a little more visually poetic."

=== How the Grinch Stole Christmas sequel ===
In June 2026, The Hollywood Reporter announced that Universal Pictures and Imagine Entertainment were developing a then-untitled sequel to 2000's How the Grinch Stole Christmas, with Howard returning to direct and Jim Carrey in talks to reprise his role as the Grinch. Alec Berg, Jeff Schaffer, and David Mandel were working on the script.

=== Robopocalypse TV pilot ===
In November 2026, The Hollywood Reporter announced that a previously-mooted Robopocalypse adaption was being redeveloped into a series, with Akiva Goldsman serving as showrunner and Howard directing the pilot episode.

== Producer only ==
=== Oh, the Places You'll Go! ===
In 1998, Howard and Brian Grazer were reportedly attached to produce a film adaptation of the Dr. Seuss children's book Oh, the Places You'll Go!, but were focused on adapting How the Grinch Stole Christmas! at the time. The film is now set be released on March 17, 2028, and will be directed by Jon M. Chu.

=== The Church of Reggie TV pilot ===
In 2007, Howard was set to produce Chuck Tatham's religious comedy The Church of Reggie with Brian Grazer and David Nevins through Imagine Entertainment for Fox.

=== Tiger & Bunny ===
In 2015, Howard and Brian Grazer signed on to co-produce a live action film adaptation of the anime Tiger & Bunny through Imagine Entertainment, as a co-production with All Nippon Entertainment Works and Bandai Namco Pictures. In 2022, Bandai Namco announced that a TV series would be made without the participation of Imagine Entertainment.

=== Be More Chill ===
In 2018, it was reported that Howard's Imagine Entertainment was in the running to acquire the film rights to Joe Iconis' musical adaptation of the novel Be More Chill, but Shawn Levy and Greg Berlanti acquired the project instead.

== See also ==
- Ron Howard filmography
