= Ron Howard =

American filmmaker and actor (born 1954)

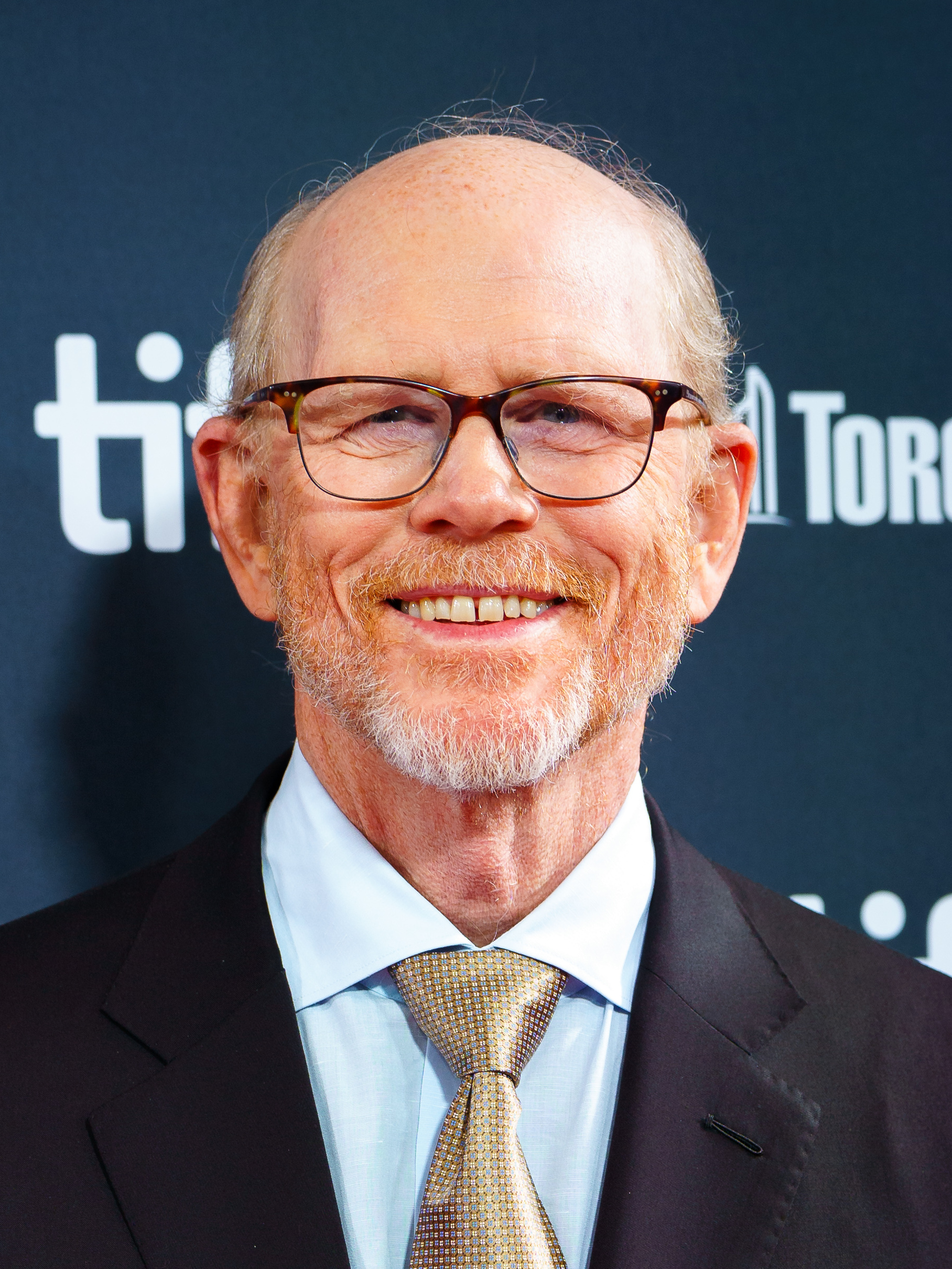
- Howard at the 2024 Toronto International Film Festival
- Born: Ronald William Howard; March 1, 1954 (age 72); Duncan, Oklahoma, US
- Occupations: Director; producer; actor
- Years active: 1959–present
- Organization: Imagine Entertainment
- Works: Filmography; unrealized projects
- Spouse: Cheryl Alley (m. 1975)
- Children: 4, including Bryce Dallas and Paige
- Parents: Rance Howard; Jean Speegle Howard
- Relatives: Clint Howard (brother)
- Awards: Full list

Ronald William Howard (born March 1, 1954) is an American filmmaker and actor. He started his career as a child actor before transitioning to directing films. Over his six-decade career, he has received multiple accolades, including two Academy Awards, seven Emmy Awards, two Golden Globe Awards, and two Grammy Awards as well as nominations for seven British Academy Film Awards. He was also awarded the National Medal of Arts in 2003 and was inducted into the Television Hall of Fame in 2013. Howard has two stars on the Hollywood Walk of Fame for his contributions in film and television.

Howard first came to prominence as a child, acting in several television series before gaining national attention for playing young Opie Taylor, the son of Sheriff Andy Taylor (played by Andy Griffith) in the sitcom The Andy Griffith Show from 1960 through 1968. During this time, he also appeared in the musical film The Music Man (1962), a critical and commercial success. Howard was cast in one of the lead roles in the coming-of-age film American Graffiti (1973), and became a household name for playing Richie Cunningham in the sitcom Happy Days (1974–1980). He starred in the films The Spikes Gang (1974), The Shootist (1976), and Grand Theft Auto (1977), the latter being his directorial film debut.

In 1980, Howard left Happy Days to focus on directing, producing, and sometimes writing a variety of films and television series. His films included the comedies Night Shift (1982), Splash (1984), and Cocoon (1985) as well as the fantasy Willow (1988), the thriller Backdraft (1991), and the newspaper comedy-drama film The Paper (1994). Howard went on to win the Academy Award for Best Director and Academy Award for Best Picture for A Beautiful Mind (2001) and was nominated again for the same awards for the historical drama Frost/Nixon (2008).

Howard has directed historical dramas such as Apollo 13 (1995), Cinderella Man (2005), Rush (2013), In the Heart of the Sea (2015), and Thirteen Lives (2022), the children's fantasy film How the Grinch Stole Christmas (2000), the mystery-thriller series Robert Langdon (2006–2016), the comedy The Dilemma (2011), and the space drama Solo: A Star Wars Story (2018). He also directed numerous documentaries such as The Beatles: Eight Days a Week (2016), Pavarotti (2019), and We Feed People (2022).

== Early life ==
Ronald William Howard was born on March 1, 1954, in Duncan, Oklahoma, the elder of the two sons of Rance Howard, a director, writer, and actor, and Jean Speegle, an actress. He is of German, English, Scottish, Irish, and Dutch ancestry. His father was born with the surname "Beckenholdt" and took the stage name "Howard" in 1948 for his acting career. Rance Howard was serving three years in the United States Air Force at the time of Ron's birth. Ron's younger brother Clint Howard is also an actor.

Howard was tutored at Desilu Studios in his younger years but continued his schooling at Robert Louis Stevenson Elementary and David Starr Jordan Junior High in Burbank, California, when not working in television, eventually graduating from Burbank's John Burroughs High School. He later attended the University of Southern California's School of Cinematic Arts but did not graduate. Howard has said he knew from a young age he might want to go into directing, thanks to his early experience as an actor.

== Acting career ==
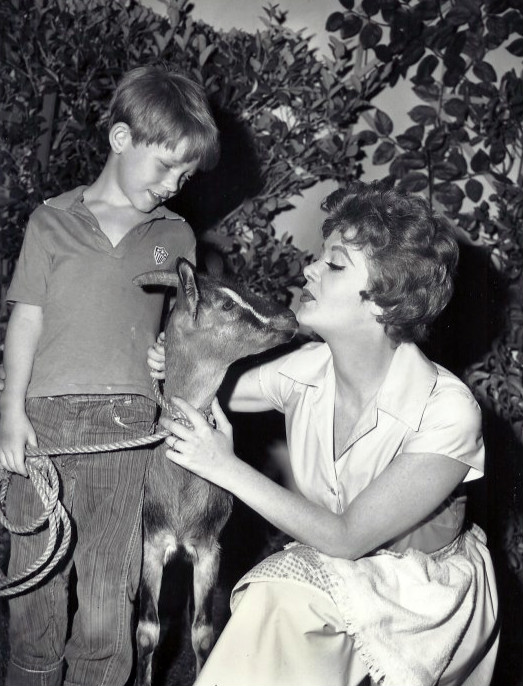
With Cara Williams in Pete and Gladys (1960)

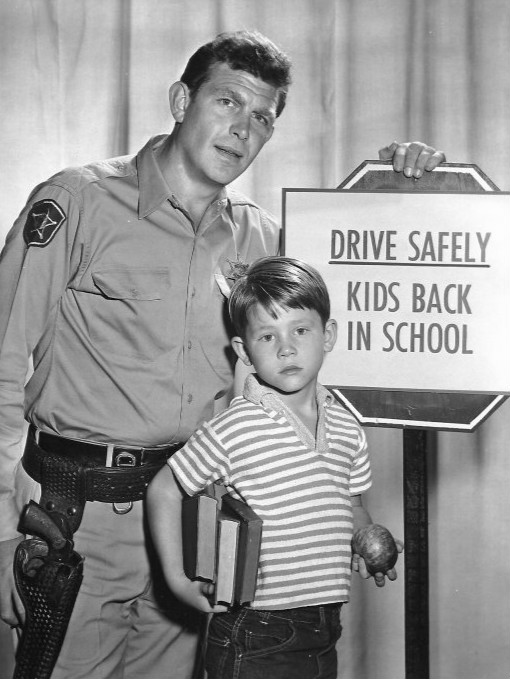
With Andy Griffith as Opie in a publicity photo for The Andy Griffith Show (1961)

In 1959, Howard had his first credited film role in The Journey. He appeared in June Allyson's CBS anthology series The DuPont Show with June Allyson in the episode "Child Lost"; in The Twilight Zone episode "Walking Distance"; a few episodes of the first season of the sitcom Dennis the Menace, as Stewart, one of Dennis's friends; and several first- and second-season episodes of The Many Loves of Dobie Gillis. Howard played "Timmy" (uncredited) in "Counterfeit Gun", Season 4, Episode 2 (1960) of the TV series Cheyenne.

=== The Andy Griffith Show (1960–1968) ===
In 1960, Howard was cast as Opie Taylor in The Andy Griffith Show. Credited as "Ronny Howard", he portrayed the son of the main character (played by Andy Griffith) for all eight seasons of the show. Recalling his experiences as a child actor on set, he commented,

I was five years old. And I was preoccupied with the prop that was in my hand, because it was a toy turtle. But I had to pretend it was a real turtle that the audience just wasn't seeing, and it was dead, so I was supposed to be crying and very emotional, and I remember him looking at that little turtle and talking to me about how it was kind of funny to have to pretend that was dead. So I recall just a very relaxed first impression.

The sitcom was known for its old-fashioned wholesome quality. Even though it was set in a contemporary period, it evoked a mood of a different era from that of the 1960s. The series also starred Don Knotts, Frances Bavier and Jim Nabors. It received numerous nominations for the Primetime Emmy Awards including three Outstanding Comedy Series nominations which it lost to The Jack Benny Show in 1961, The Bob Newhart Show in 1962, and The Monkees in 1967. Howard reprised the role of Opie Taylor one final time in the 1986 NBC TV movie Return to Mayberry.

=== Happy Days (1974–1984) ===
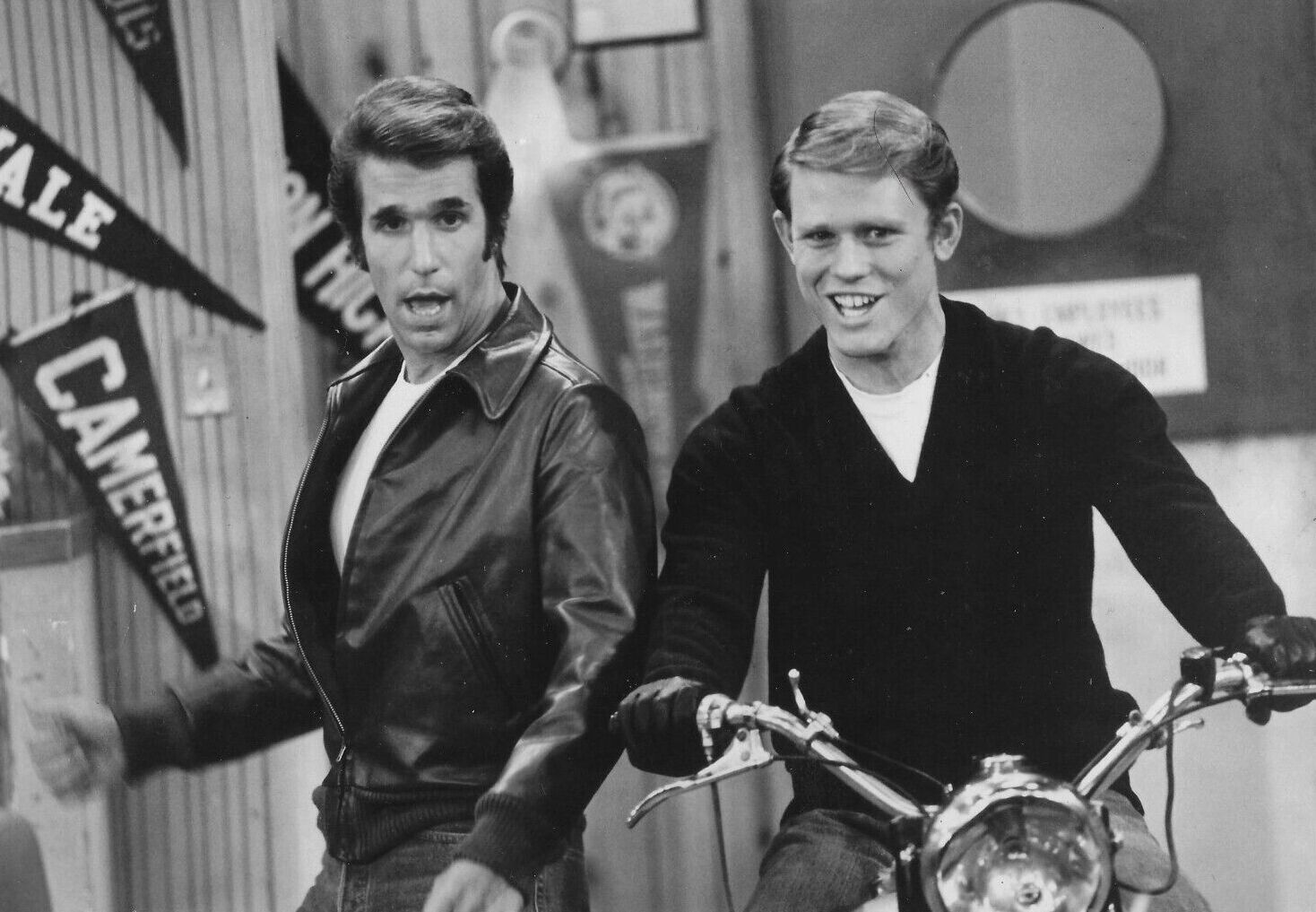
Richie (Ron Howard) takes a turn on Fonzie's (Henry Winkler) motorcycle in a scene from Happy Days

A role in an installment of the ABC anthology comedy series Love, American Style, titled "Love and the Television Set", led to his being cast as Richie Cunningham in the TV series Happy Days (for syndication, the segment was re-titled "Love and the Happy Days"). Beginning in 1974, he played the likable "buttoned-down" boy, in contrast to Henry Winkler's "greaser" Arthur "Fonzie"/"The Fonz" Fonzarelli. On the Happy Days set, he developed an on- and off-screen chemistry with Winkler. Howard left Happy Days to become a film director just before the start of its eighth season in 1980, but returned for guest appearances in the show's eleventh season (1983–1984).

=== Additional acting roles ===
In the 1962 film version of The Music Man, Howard played Winthrop Paroo, the child with the lisp; the film starred Robert Preston, Shirley Jones, and Buddy Hackett. The film was based on the 1957 musical of the same name by Meredith Willson, and was directed by Morton DaCosta. The film was a critical and commercial success, becoming the third highest-grossing film of that year. The Music Man went on to receive six Academy Award nominations including for Best Picture. He also starred in the 1963 film The Courtship of Eddie's Father, in which he was reunited with Jones and starred with Glenn Ford in the titular role.

In his most significant adult on-screen acting role, Howard played Steve Bolander in George Lucas's coming-of-age film American Graffiti in 1973. As part of a memorable cast of up-and-coming actors, Howard starred alongside Richard Dreyfus, Cindy Williams, Charles Martin Smith, and Harrison Ford. Critic Roger Ebert of the Chicago Sun-Times praised the film in his four-star review writing, "American Graffiti is not only a great movie but a brilliant work of historical fiction; no sociological treatise could duplicate the movie's success in remembering exactly how it was to be alive at that cultural instant." In addition to critical acclaim, the film also grossed $55 million, becoming the third highest-grossing film of that year. The success of American Graffiti (along with Howard's performance) was the inspiration for the sitcom Happy Days starring Howard. In 1976, Howard starred alongside John Wayne and Lauren Bacall in Don Siegel's The Shootist, the story of a Western gunfighter dying of cancer. (The movie was Wayne's last.) Howard reprised the role of Steve Bolander in the sequel More American Graffiti (1979) in what is to date his last credited feature film role.

On television, from 1971 to 1972 Howard was a main cast member in the ABC drama series The Smith Family as Bob Smith, the son of Henry Fonda's lead character (his only regular on-screen TV role outside of The Andy Griffith Show and Happy Days). He also made many guest-starring TV appearances throughout the 1960s and 1970s, some of the most notable including: as Tommy in the 12th episode of the first season of The Big Valley and as Barry Stewart on The Eleventh Hour, both in 1965; on I Spy in the 1966 episode "Little Boy Lost"; as Jodar in Land of the Giants, and as a boy whose father was shot on Daniel Boone, both in 1969; as a teenage tennis player with an illness in one episode of The Bold Ones in 1972; and as an underage Marine on M*A*S*H in the 1973 episode "Sometimes You Hear the Bullet". In 1974, Howard guest-starred as Seth Turner, the best friend of Jason Walton (Jon Walmsley), in The Waltons episode, "The Gift". Also featured in the same episode was Ron Howard's father Rance Howard in his recurring role of Dr. McIvers. Howard's final lead acting roles were in the TV movies Bitter Harvest and Fire on the Mountain, both of which were broadcast on NBC in 1981.

As he focused on his directing and producing career, Howard made fewer appearances in front of the camera. His most prominent acting role in later years was as the unseen narrator of the TV comedy Arrested Development for the duration of the series from 2003 to 2019. In addition to the uncredited voice role, he also made cameo appearances as himself in several seasons of the series, of which he was an executive producer. Howard has also appeared as a fictionalized version of himself in various television series such as The Simpsons, This Is Us, Only Murders In The Building, and The Studio, the last of which earned Howard a 2025 Emmy nomination for Outstanding Guest Actor in a Comedy Series. It marked Howard's first acting Emmy nomination in his entire career.

Howard appeared on the 1969 Disneyland Records album The Story and Song from the Haunted Mansion. It featured the story of two teenagers, Mike (Howard) and Karen (Robie Lester), who get trapped inside the Haunted Mansion. Thurl Ravenscroft plays the Narrator, Pete Reneday plays the Ghost Host, and Eleanor Audley plays Madame Leota. Some of the effects and ideas that were planned but never permanently made it to the attraction are mentioned here: the Raven speaks in the Stretching Room, and the Hatbox Ghost is mentioned during the Attic scene. It was reissued in 1998 as a cassette tape titled A Spooky Night in Disney's Haunted Mansion and on CD in 2009.

== Directing career ==
=== 1977–1992: Rise to prominence ===
Before leaving Happy Days in 1980, Howard made his directing debut with the 1977 low-budget comedy/action film Grand Theft Auto, based on a script he co-wrote with his father, Rance. This came after cutting a deal with Roger Corman, wherein Corman let Howard direct a film in exchange for Howard starring in Eat My Dust!, with Christopher Norris. Howard went on to direct several TV movies for NBC between 1978 and 1982, including the 1980 TV movie, Skyward, starring Bette Davis. His big directorial break came in 1982, with Night Shift, featuring Michael Keaton, Shelley Long, and Howard's Happy Days co-star Henry Winkler.

Following Night Shift, Howard directed a number of major films, including the fantasy romantic comedy Splash (1984) starring Tom Hanks, Daryl Hannah, Eugene Levy, and John Candy. The film was a box office and critical success. He also directed the science-fiction comedy-drama Cocoon (1985) starring Don Ameche, Hume Cronyn, Wilford Brimley, and Brian Dennehy. This film was also a critical and financial hit and won a Best Supporting Actor award for Don Ameche. In 1988, he collaborated again with George Lucas on the high fantasy adventure film Willow starring Val Kilmer and Warwick Davis. Howard's final work as a director for the 1980s was the family comedy film Parenthood (1989) starring an ensemble cast that includes Steve Martin, Tom Hulce, Rick Moranis, Martha Plimpton, Joaquin Phoenix, Keanu Reeves, Jason Robards, Mary Steenburgen, and Dianne Wiest. The film opened at #1 in its opening weekend, earning $10 million. It eventually grossed over $100 million domestically and $126 million worldwide. The film was a critical hit and received two Academy Award nominations.

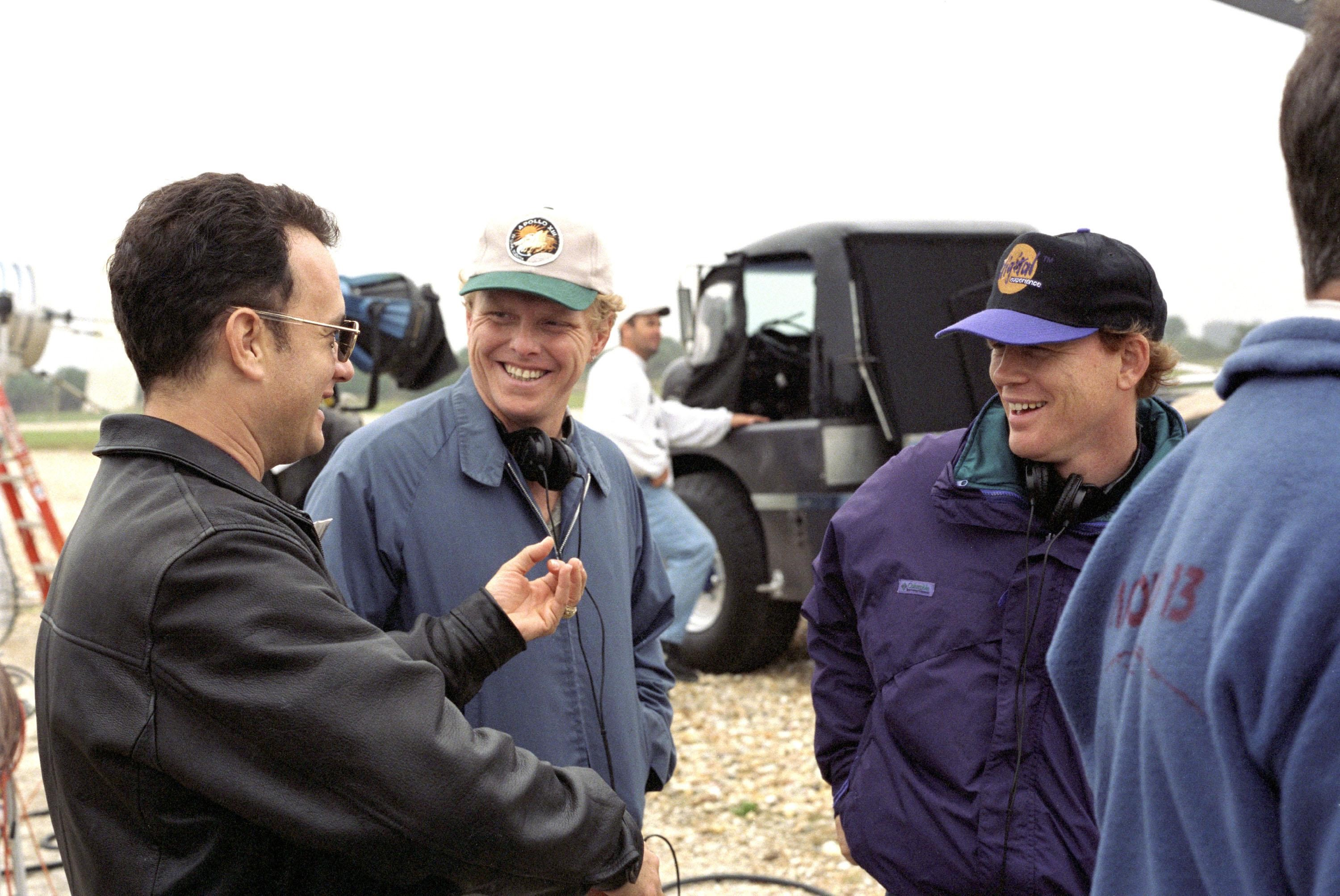
Howard (right) with Tom Hanks and the production crew of Apollo 13 (1995)

Howard continued directing through the 1990s, including the American thriller Backdraft revolving around firefighters. The film starred Kurt Russell, Donald Sutherland, and Robert De Niro. Film critics Gene Siskel of the Chicago Tribune and Roger Ebert of the Chicago Sun-Times gave the film a positive review. In 1992, he directed the western film epic Far and Away starring Tom Cruise and Nicole Kidman. Despite receiving mixed reviews from critics the film was a financial success, earning 137 million against its budget of 60 million. In 1994, Howard directed the newspaper comedy-drama The Paper with an ensemble starring Michael Keaton, Glenn Close, Marisa Tomei, Jason Alexander, Jason Robards, and Robert Duvall. The film received rave reviews with many praising Keaton's leading performance.

=== 1995–2008: Historical dramas and acclaim ===
Howard's direction for the 1995 docudrama film Apollo 13 received praise from critics. The film stars Tom Hanks, Kevin Bacon, and Bill Paxton as three astronauts, members of the Apollo 13 flight crew, with supporting performances from Gary Sinise, Ed Harris, and Kathleen Quinlan. The film was a massive financial success earning $335 million off a budget of $52 million. The film received widespread critical acclaim with Roger Ebert of the Chicago Sun-Times praising the film in his review saying: "A powerful story, one of the year's best films, told with great clarity and remarkable technical detail, and acted without pumped-up histrionics." The film went on to receive nine Academy Award nominations including Best Picture.

In 2000, he directed the live-action children's fantasy film, How the Grinch Stole Christmas based on the Dr. Seuss children's book. The film starred Jim Carrey as the titular character and featured performances from Jeffrey Tambor, Christine Baranski, and Molly Shannon, with Anthony Hopkins serving as the film's narrator. Despite the film receiving mixed reviews from critics, it was a financial success, earning $345 million at the box office and ranking it as the sixth-highest-grossing film of 2000. It also became the highest-grossing film of that year domestically with $260 million, beating Mission: Impossible 2. Howard's follow-up film was the 2001 biographical drama film A Beautiful Mind starring Russell Crowe as the American mathematician John Nash Jr. who struggled with paranoid schizophrenia. The film featured performances from Jennifer Connelly, Ed Harris, Josh Lucas, and Christopher Plummer. The film received positive reviews from critics who praised Crowe's and Connelly's performances. The film went on to receive eight Academy Award nominations including a win for Best Picture and a nomination and win for Howard as Best Director. Howard was nominated alongside Peter Jackson, Ridley Scott, Robert Altman, and David Lynch.

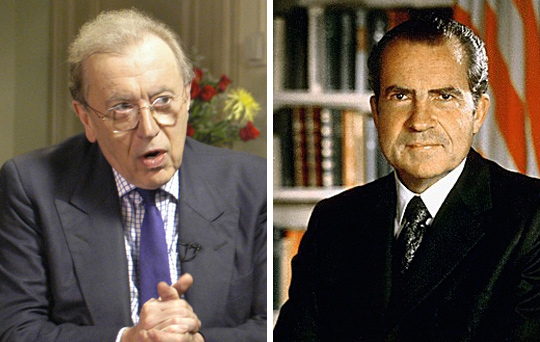
Howard directed Frost/Nixon (2008) based on the conversations between David Frost and Richard Nixon.

In 2005, Howard directed the biographical sports drama Cinderella Man based on the true story of heavyweight boxing champion James J. Braddock played by Russell Crowe. The film also starred Renée Zellweger as his wife Mae Braddock, and Paul Giamatti as his trainer Joe Gould. Rotten Tomatoes gave it an approval rating of 80% based on reviews from 214 critics with an average score of 7.4/10. Its consensus states, "With grittiness and an evocative sense of time and place, Cinderella Man is a powerful underdog story. And Ron Howard and Russell Crowe prove to be a solid combination." Howard is also known for directing the Robert Langdon films. The series began with The Da Vinci Code (2006) with Tom Hanks as Langdon, featuring performances by Audrey Tautou, Ian McKellen, and Alfred Molina. The sequel was Angels & Demons (2009) with Hanks reprising his role and performances by Ewan McGregor and Stellan Skarsgård. In 2016, Inferno was released with Hanks continuing the role with performances by Felicity Jones, Irrfan Khan, and Omar Sy. All three films received mixed reviews, but were popular among audiences.

Howard showcased the world premiere of his historical drama film Frost/Nixon at the London Film Festival in October 2008. The film is based on the taped conversations known as the Frost/Nixon interviews between former United States President Richard Nixon and British talk show host David Frost. Frank Langella portrayed Nixon opposite Michael Sheen as Frost. The film was based on the play of the same name by Peter Morgan. The film also featured performances from Mathew Macfadyen, Sam Rockwell, Rebecca Hall, Oliver Platt, Toby Jones, and Kevin Bacon. Despite losing money at the box office, the film was a critical success with website Rotten Tomatoes giving the film an approval rating of 93% with the critical consensus reading, "Frost/Nixon is weighty and eloquent; a cross between a boxing match and a ballet with Oscar-worthy performances." Metacritic gives the film an average score of 80 out of 100, based on 38 critics, indicating "generally favorable reviews". The film received five Academy Award nominations with Howard receiving a nomination for Best Director. The Guardian praised the film declaring, "Frost/Nixon is a riveting film, sharper, more intense than the play". Howard was the recipient of the Austin Film Festival's 2009 Extraordinary Contribution to Filmmaking Award. Michael Keaton presented him the Award.

=== 2009–present ===
In 2013, Howard directed sports drama Rush, based on the Hunt–Lauda rivalry between two Formula One drivers, the British James Hunt and the Austrian Niki Lauda during the 1976 Formula 1 motor-racing season. It was written by Peter Morgan and starred Chris Hemsworth as Hunt, Daniel Brühl as Lauda, and Olivia Wilde as Suzy Miller. The film premiered at the 2013 Toronto International Film Festival and received positive reviews from critics. In 2015, Howard directed the film In the Heart of the Sea about the sinking of the American whaling ship Essex in 1820, an event that inspired Herman Melville's 1851 novel Moby-Dick. The film featured performances by Chris Hemsworth, Cillian Murphy, Tom Holland, Ben Whishaw, and Brendan Gleeson. The film was a financial failure and received mixed reviews.

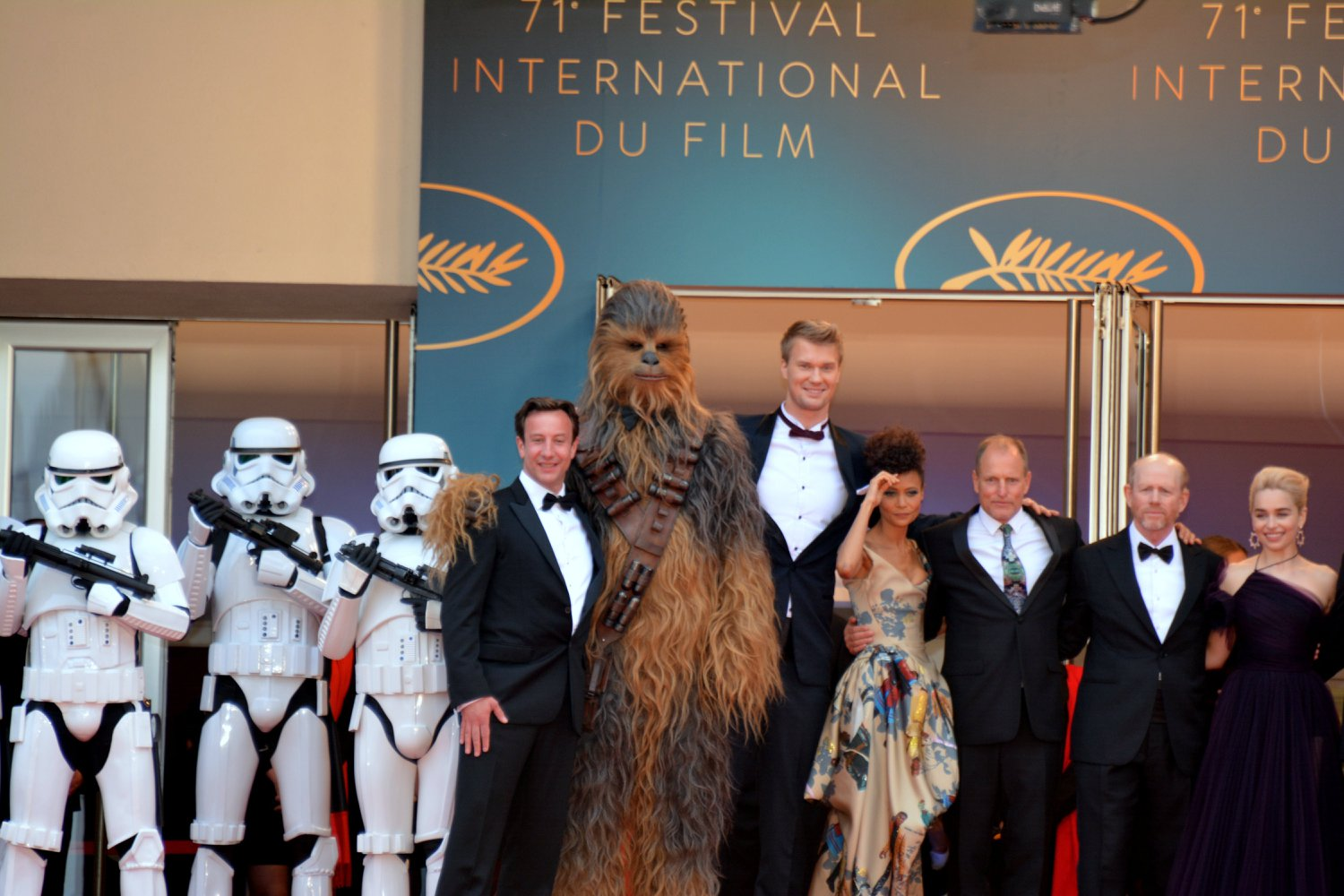
Howard (second from right) and the cast at the 2018 Cannes Film Festival

Howard took over directing duties on Solo: A Star Wars Story, a film featuring Star Wars character Han Solo in his younger years. The film was released on May 23, 2018. Howard officially replaced directors Phil Lord and Christopher Miller on June 22, 2017; they were let go from their position two days earlier, reportedly due to their refusal to compromise with Lucasfilm over the direction of the film; reportedly the directors encouraged significant improvisations by the actors, which was believed by some at Lucasfilm to be "shifting the story off-course". At the time, the film was nearly completed, with three and a half weeks left to film and another five weeks of reshoots scheduled. Howard posted on Twitter, "I'm beyond grateful to add my voice to the Star Wars Universe after being a fan since 5/25/77. I hope to honor the great work already done & help deliver on the promise of a Han Solo film."

In November 2017, Howard announced that he would be teaching his first directing class. On November 24, 2020, Howard's drama film Hillbilly Elegy was released on Netflix. The film is based on the memoir of the same name by JD Vance and was adapted for the screen by Vanessa Taylor. The film stars Academy Award nominees Glenn Close and Amy Adams. The film has received widespread negative reception from critics.

In March 2021, Howard began filming the survival drama Thirteen Lives, a film based on the Tham Luang cave rescue in 2018. It was released in select theaters on July 29, 2022, by United Artists Releasing, and began streaming on Prime Video on August 5, 2022. The film received generally positive reviews from critics. In 2022, Netflix acquired from Paramount Pictures The Shrinking of Treehorn, which would mark Howard's first time directing an animated feature, and the survival thriller Eden starring Jude Law and Ana de Armas.

== Imagine Entertainment ==
Howard is a co-chairman, with Brian Grazer, of Imagine Entertainment, a film and television production company. Imagine has produced several films including Friday Night Lights, 8 Mile, and Inside Deep Throat, as well as the television series 24, Felicity, The PJs, and Arrested Development which Howard also narrated and later appeared in as himself.

In July 2012, it was announced that Imagine had put into development Conquest for Showtime, a period drama based on the 16th century conquest of the Aztecs by Spanish Conquistadors. Intended to be directed by Howard, the series was originally planned as a feature film before it was decided that the project was more suited to television.

As part of Imagine Entertainment, he appeared in a 1997 print ad for Milk - Where's your mustache?, in which he wore a cap for Imagine Entertainment and sported a milk mustache. Earlier versions show a younger Ronny Howard on the other side. In 2009, he appeared in the Jamie Foxx music video "Blame It".

== Personal life ==
Howard married Cheryl Alley on June 7, 1975. They have four children, including Bryce Dallas Howard and Paige Howard.

In February 2025, Howard revealed that he had learned that he and his co-star Don Knotts were distant cousins, but neither had known during Knotts's lifetime.

== Filmography ==
Directed features
Year	Title	Distributor
1977	Grand Theft Auto	New World Pictures
1982	Night Shift	Warner Bros.
1984	Splash	Buena Vista Distribution
1985	Cocoon	20th Century Fox
1986	Gung Ho	Paramount Pictures
1988	Willow	MGM/UA Distribution Co.
1989	Parenthood	Universal Pictures
1991	Backdraft	Universal Pictures
1992	Far and Away	Universal Pictures
1994	The Paper	Universal Pictures
1995	Apollo 13	Universal Pictures
1996	Ransom	Buena Vista Distribution
1999	EDtv	Universal Pictures
2000	How the Grinch Stole Christmas	Universal Pictures
2001	A Beautiful Mind	Universal Pictures / DreamWorks Pictures
2003	The Missing	Sony Pictures Releasing
2005	Cinderella Man	Universal Pictures / Buena Vista International
2006	The Da Vinci Code	Sony Pictures Releasing
2008	Frost/Nixon	Universal Pictures
2009	Angels & Demons	Sony Pictures Releasing
2011	The Dilemma	Universal Pictures
2013	Rush	Universal Pictures
2015	In the Heart of the Sea	Warner Bros. Pictures
2016	Inferno	Sony Pictures Releasing
2018	Solo: A Star Wars Story	Walt Disney Studios Motion Pictures
2020	Hillbilly Elegy	Netflix
2022	Thirteen Lives	United Artists Releasing / Amazon Studios
2024	Eden	Vertical
2027	Alone at Dawn	Amazon MGM Studios

== Accolades ==
Year	Title	Academy Awards		BAFTA Awards		Golden Globe Awards	
Year	Title	Nominations	Wins	Nominations	Wins	Nominations	Wins
1982	Night Shift					1	
1984	Splash	1				1	
1985	Cocoon	2	2			1	
1988	Willow	2					
1989	Parenthood	2				1	
1991	Backdraft	3		1			
1994	The Paper	1					
1995	Apollo 13	9	2	5	2	4	
1996	Ransom					1	
2000	How the Grinch Stole Christmas	3	1	1	1	1	
2001	A Beautiful Mind	8	4	5	2	6	4
2005	Cinderella Man	3		1		2	
2006	The Da Vinci Code					1	
2008	Frost/Nixon	5		6		5	
2013	Rush			4	1	2	
2018	Solo: A Star Wars Story	1					
2020	Hillbilly Elegy	2		1		1	
Total		41	9	24	6	27	4

Directed Academy Award performances
Under Howard's direction, these actors have received Academy Award wins and nomimations for their performances in their respective roles.

Year	Performer	Film	Result
Academy Award for Best Actor
2001	Russell Crowe	A Beautiful Mind	Nominated
2008	Frank Langella	Frost/Nixon	Nominated
Academy Award for Best Supporting Actor
1985	Don Ameche	Cocoon	Won
1995	Ed Harris	Apollo 13	Nominated
2005	Paul Giamatti	Cinderella Man	Nominated
Academy Award for Best Supporting Actress
1989	Dianne Wiest	Parenthood	Nominated
1995	Kathleen Quinlan	Apollo 13	Nominated
2001	Jennifer Connelly	A Beautiful Mind	Won
2020	Glenn Close	Hillbilly Elegy	Nominated

== See also ==
- Ron Howard's unrealized projects

== Bibliography ==
- John Holmstrom. The Moving Picture Boy: An International Encyclopaedia from 1895 to 1995. Norwich, Michael Russell, 1996, p. 304-305.
- Ron Howard and Clint Howard. The Boys: A Memoir of Hollywood and Family. William Morrow, 2021. ISBN 9780063065246.
- Gray, Beverly (2003). Ron Howard: From Mayberry to the Moon...and Beyond. Rutledge Hill Press. ISBN 9781558539709.
- Jolls, Michael (2024). The Films of Ron Howard. independent. ISBN 9798327235731.
