= List of awards and nominations received by Ron Howard =

Ron Howard awards and nominations
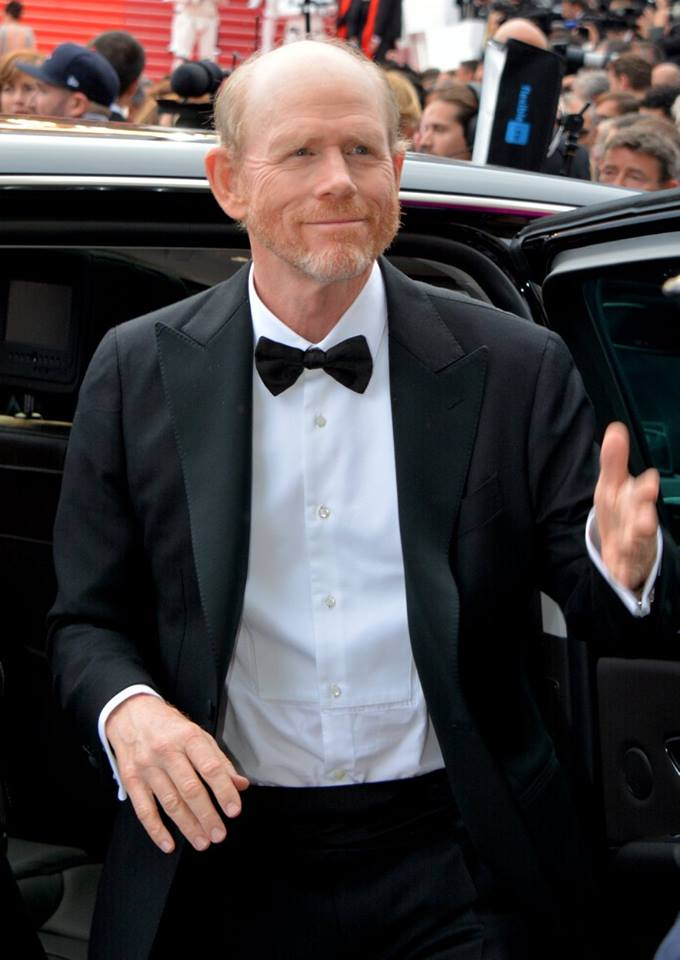
- Howard in 2018
Awards and nominations
Award	Wins	Nominations
Golden Globe	2	8
Grammy	2	2
Academy Awards	2	4
BAFTA Awards	0	7
Emmy Awards	8	27

Totals (Note: Certain award groups do not simply award one winner. They acknowledge several different recipients, have runners-up, and have third place. Since this is a specific recognition and is different from losing an award, runner-up mentions are considered wins in this award tally. For simplification and to avoid errors, each award in this list has been presumed to have had a prior nomination.)
- Wins: 41
- Nominations: 153

The following is a list of awards and nominations received by Ron Howard.

Ron Howard is American actor and filmmaker. Over his decades-spanning career as an actor, director and producer, Howard has won two Academy Awards, eight Emmy Awards, two Grammy Awards, two Golden Globe Awards, and two Directors Guild of America Awards as well as nominations for seven BAFTA Awards and a Screen Actors Guild Award. He additionally received the National Medal of Arts in 2003 as well as two stars on the Hollywood Walk of Fame for his contributions to television and motion pictures in 1981 and 2015, respectively.

Howard won Academy Awards for Best Picture and Best Director for the biographical drama A Beautiful Mind (2001). He was Oscar-nominated for the same two awards for the political drama Frost/Nixon (2008). He won the Directors Guild of America Award for Outstanding Directing – Feature Film for both the docudrama Apollo 13 (1995) and A Beautiful Mind (2001). For his work in film he received nominations for five BAFTA Award and four Golden Globe Awards. He received the Grammy Award for Best Music Film for The Beatles: Eight Days a Week (2017).

For his work on television, Howard won the Primetime Emmy Award for Outstanding Limited or Anthology Series and the Golden Globe Award for Best Limited or Anthology Series or Television Film for the HBO miniseries From the Earth to the Moon (1998). He also won the Primetime Emmy Award for Outstanding Comedy Series for the first season of the Fox sitcom Arrested Development (2004). He won the Daytime Emmy Award for Outstanding Children's Animated Program twice for producing the PBS Kids series Curious George in 2008 and 2010.

== Major associations ==
=== Academy Awards ===
Year	Category	Nominated work	Result	Ref.
2002	Best Picture	A Beautiful Mind	Won	
2002	Best Director	A Beautiful Mind	Won	
2009	Best Picture	Frost/Nixon	Nominated	
2009	Best Director	Frost/Nixon	Nominated	

=== BAFTA Awards ===
Year	Category	Nominated work	Result	Ref.
British Academy Film Awards
2002	Best Film	A Beautiful Mind	Nominated	
2002	Best Direction	A Beautiful Mind	Nominated	
2009	Best Film	Frost/Nixon	Nominated	
2009	Best Direction	Frost/Nixon	Nominated	
2014	Best British Film	Rush	Nominated	
2017	Best Documentary	The Beatles: Eight Days a Week	Nominated	
British Academy Children's Awards
2001	Best Feature Film	How the Grinch Stole Christmas	Nominated	

=== Emmy Awards ===
Year	Category	Nominated work	Result	Ref.
Primetime Emmy Awards
1982	Outstanding Children's Program	Through the Magic Pyramid	Nominated	
1998	Outstanding Miniseries	From the Earth to the Moon	Won	
1999	Outstanding Animated Program	The PJs: He's Gotta Have It	Nominated	
2004	Outstanding Comedy Series	Arrested Development	Won	
2005	Outstanding Comedy Series	Arrested Development	Nominated	
2006	Outstanding Comedy Series	Arrested Development	Nominated	
2017	Outstanding Limited Series	Genius	Nominated	
2017	Outstanding Directing for a Limited Series or Movie	Genius	Nominated	
2017	Outstanding Documentary or Nonfiction Special	The Beatles: Eight Days a Week	Nominated	
2018	Outstanding Limited Series	Genius: Picasso	Nominated	
2022	Outstanding Documentary or Nonfiction Special	We Feed People	Nominated	
2024	Outstanding Documentary or Nonfiction Special	Jim Henson Idea Man	Won	
2024	Outstanding Directing for a Documentary/Nonfiction Program	Jim Henson Idea Man	Nominated	
2025	Outstanding Guest Actor in a Comedy Series	The Studio (episode: "The Note")	Nominated	
Daytime Emmy Awards
2007	Outstanding Children's Animated Program	Curious George	Nominated	
2008	Outstanding Children's Animated Program	Curious George	Won	
2009	Outstanding Children's Animated Program	Curious George	Nominated	
2010	Outstanding Children's Animated Program	Curious George	Won	
2011	Outstanding Children's Animated Program	Curious George	Nominated	
2012	Outstanding Children's Animated Program	Curious George	Nominated	
2014	Outstanding Pre-School Children's Animated Program	Curious George	Nominated	
2020	Outstanding Special Class - Short Format Daytime Program	Peanuts in Space: Secrets of Apollo 10	Nominated	
Children's and Family Emmy Awards
2022	Outstanding Children's or Family Viewing Series	The Astronauts	Nominated	
2022	Outstanding Non-Fiction Program	Who Are You, Charlie Brown?	Won	
2023	Outstanding Preschool Animated Series	The Tiny Chef Show	Nominated	
2024	Outstanding Preschool Animated Series	The Tiny Chef Show	Won	
2025	Outstanding Preschool Animated Series	The Tiny Chef Show	Won	

=== Golden Globe Awards ===
Year	Category	Nominated work	Result	Ref.
1977	Best Supporting Actor – Motion Picture	The Shootist	Nominated	
1978	Best Actor in a Television Series – Musical or Comedy	Happy Days	Won	
1996	Best Director – Motion Picture	Apollo 13	Nominated	
1999	Best Limited Series	From the Earth to the Moon	Won	
2002	Best Director - Motion Picture	A Beautiful Mind	Nominated	
2004	Best Television Series – Musical or Comedy	Arrested Development	Nominated	
2005	Best Television Series – Musical or Comedy	Arrested Development	Nominated	
2009	Best Director – Motion Picture	Frost/Nixon	Nominated	

=== Grammy Awards ===
Year	Category	Nominated work	Result	Ref.
2017	Best Music Film	The Beatles: Eight Days a Week	Won	
2026	Best Music Film	Music by John Williams	Won	

== Guild awards ==
Organizations	Year	Category	Work	Result	Ref.
Directors Guild of America	1986	Outstanding Directing – Feature Film	Cocoon	Nominated	
Directors Guild of America	1996	Outstanding Directing – Feature Film	Apollo 13	Won	
Directors Guild of America	2002	Outstanding Directing – Feature Film	A Beautiful Mind	Won	
Directors Guild of America	2009	Outstanding Directing – Feature Film	Frost/Nixon	Nominated	
Producers Guild of America	1999	Outstanding Producer of Long-Form Television	From the Earth to the Moon	Won	
Producers Guild of America	2000	Outstanding Producer of Episodic Television	Sports Night	Nominated	
Producers Guild of America	2002	Outstanding Producer of Theatrical Motion Pictures	A Beautiful Mind	Nominated	
Producers Guild of America	2005	Outstanding Producer of Episodic Television - Comedy	Arrested Development	Nominated	
Producers Guild of America	2006	Outstanding Producer of Episodic Television - Comedy	Arrested Development	Nominated	
Producers Guild of America	2007	Outstanding Producer of Episodic Television - Comedy	Arrested Development	Nominated	
Producers Guild of America	2009	Outstanding Producer of Theatrical Motion Pictures	Frost/Nixon	Nominated	
Producers Guild of America	2009	Milestone Award		Won	
Producers Guild of America	2014	Outstanding Producer of Episodic Television - Comedy	Arrested Development	Nominated	
Screen Actors Guild Awards	2014	Outstanding Ensemble in a Comedy Series	Arrested Development	Nominated	

== Critics associations ==
Organizations	Year	Category	Work	Result	Ref.
Critics' Choice Movie Award	1995	Best Director	Apollo 13	Nominated	
Critics' Choice Movie Award	2001	Best Director	A Beautiful Mind	Won	
Critics' Choice Movie Award	2005	Best Director	Cinderella Man	Nominated	
Critics' Choice Movie Award	2008	Best Director	Frost/Nixon	Nominated	
Critics' Choice Movie Award	2015	Louis XIII Genius Award	—N/a	Won	
Chicago Film Critics Association	1995	Best Director	Apollo 13	Nominated	
Chicago Film Critics Association	2001	Best Director	A Beautiful Mind	Nominated	
Dallas–Fort Worth Film Critics Association	2001	Best Director	A Beautiful Mind	Won	
Dallas–Fort Worth Film Critics Association	2008	Best Director	Frost/Nixon	Nominated	
Detroit Film Critics Society	2008	Best Director	Frost/Nixon	Nominated	
Houston Film Critics Society	2008	Best Director	Frost/Nixon	Nominated	
Italian National Syndicate of Film Journalists	2005	Best Foreign Director	Cinderella Man	Nominated	
St. Louis Film Critics Association	2008	Best Director	Frost/Nixon	Nominated	
Washington D.C. Area Film Critics Association	2005	Best Director	Cinderella Man	Nominated	

== Miscellaneous awards ==
Organizations	Year	Category	Work	Result	Ref.
AACTA Award	2014	Best Film	Rush	Nominated	
Amanda Award	2002	Best Foreign Feature Film	A Beautiful Mind	Nominated	
Australian Film Institute	2002	Best Foreign Film	A Beautiful Mind	Nominated	
Berlin International Film Festival	2004	Golden Bear	The Missing	Nominated	
Black Reel Award	2014	Outstanding Television Documentary	Made in America	Nominated	
CableACE Award	1985	Dramatic Series	Maximum Security	Nominated	
Cannes Film Festival	2024	L'Œil d'or	Jim Henson Idea Man	Nominated	
Christopher Award	2001	Film	A Beautiful Mind	Won	
Critics' Choice Documentary Awards	2016	Best Director	The Beatles: Eight Days a Week	Nominated	
Czech Lion	2003	Best Foreign Language Film	A Beautiful Mind	Nominated	
DVD Exclusive Award	2003	Best Audio Commentary (New Release)	A Beautiful Mind	Nominated	
Empire Award	2006	Best Director	Cinderella Man	Nominated	
Golden Eagle Award	1972	CINE Golden Eagle Award	Deed of Daring-Do	Won	
Golden Eagle Award	2003	Best Foreign Film	A Beautiful Mind	Nominated	
Golden Raspberry Award	2006	Worst Director	The Da Vinci Code	Nominated	
Golden Raspberry Award	2021	Worst Director	Hillbilly Elegy	Nominated	
Hugo Award	1986	Best Dramatic Presentation	Cocoon	Nominated	
Hugo Award	1989	Best Dramatic Presentation	Willow	Nominated	
Hugo Award	1996	Best Dramatic Presentation	Apollo 13	Nominated	
Hollywood Film Award	2003	Outstanding Achievement in Directing	—N/a	Won	
Hochi Film Award	2005	Best Foreign Language Film	Cinderella Man	Won	
IDA Documentary Award	2017	Best Episodic Series	Mars	Nominated	
Jupiter Award	1995	Best International Film	Apollo 13	Won	
Monte-Carlo Television Festival	2005	Best TV Series - Comedy	Arrested Development	Won	
ShoWest	2002	Director of the Year	—N/a	Won	
Robert Award	2014	Best Non-American Film	Rush	Nominated	
Satellite Awards	2008	Best Director	Frost/Nixon	Nominated	
Satellite Awards	2013	Best Director	Rush	Nominated	
Saturn Awards	1985	Best Director	Splash	Nominated	
Saturn Awards	1986	Best Director	Cocoon	Won	
Saturn Awards	2001	Best Director	How the Grinch Stole Christmas	Nominated	
Tokyo International Film Festival	1989	Grand Prix	Parenthood	Nominated	
Venice Film Festival	1985	Young Venice Award	Cocoon	Won	

== Honorary awards ==
Organizations	Year	Award	Result	Ref.
Hollywood Walk of Fame	1981	Television Star	Honored	
American Cinematheque Award	1990	Statue	Honored	
American Academy of Achievement	1997	Golden Plate Award	Honored	
Society of Camera Operators	1998	Governor's Award	Honored	
National Medal of Arts	2003	Medal	Honored	
American Cinema Editors	2006	Filmmaker of the Year Award	Honored	
American Society of Cinematographers	2007	Board of Governors Award	Honored	
Austin Film Festival	2009	Extraordinary Contribution to Filmmaking	Honored	
Palm Springs International Film Festival	2009	Lifetime Achievement Award	Honored	
Chicago International Film Festival	2010	Career Achievement Award	Honored	
Television Hall of Fame	2013	Inducteee	Honored	
Hollywood Walk of Fame	2015	Motion Picture Star	Honored	
Newport Beach Film Festival	2022	Groundbreaker Award	Honored	
Critics' Choice Documentary Awards	2026	Critics Choice Impact Award	Honored	
