= Treehorn's Treasure =

1981 picture book by Florence Parry Heide

- First edition
- Author: Florence Parry Heide
- Illustrator: Edward Gorey
- Publisher: Holiday House
- Publication date: 1981
- ISBN: 0-8234-0425-0
- OCLC: 7463898
- LC Class: PZ7.H36 Tr
- Preceded by: The Shrinking of Treehorn
- Followed by: Treehorn's Wish

Treehorn's Treasure is a book by Florence Parry Heide, illustrated by Edward Gorey and first published in 1981. It belongs to the same series as The Shrinking of Treehorn (1971). In Treehorn's Treasure, the main character Treehorn discovers that money does in fact grow on trees – his tree!

This book was followed by Treehorn's Wish.

== Reception ==
David Sowerby, in The Westmorland Gazette, called Treehorn's Treasure a "very entertaining book, suitable for six to eighteen year olds".
