= Christopher Norris (actress) =

American movie and television actress (born 1953)

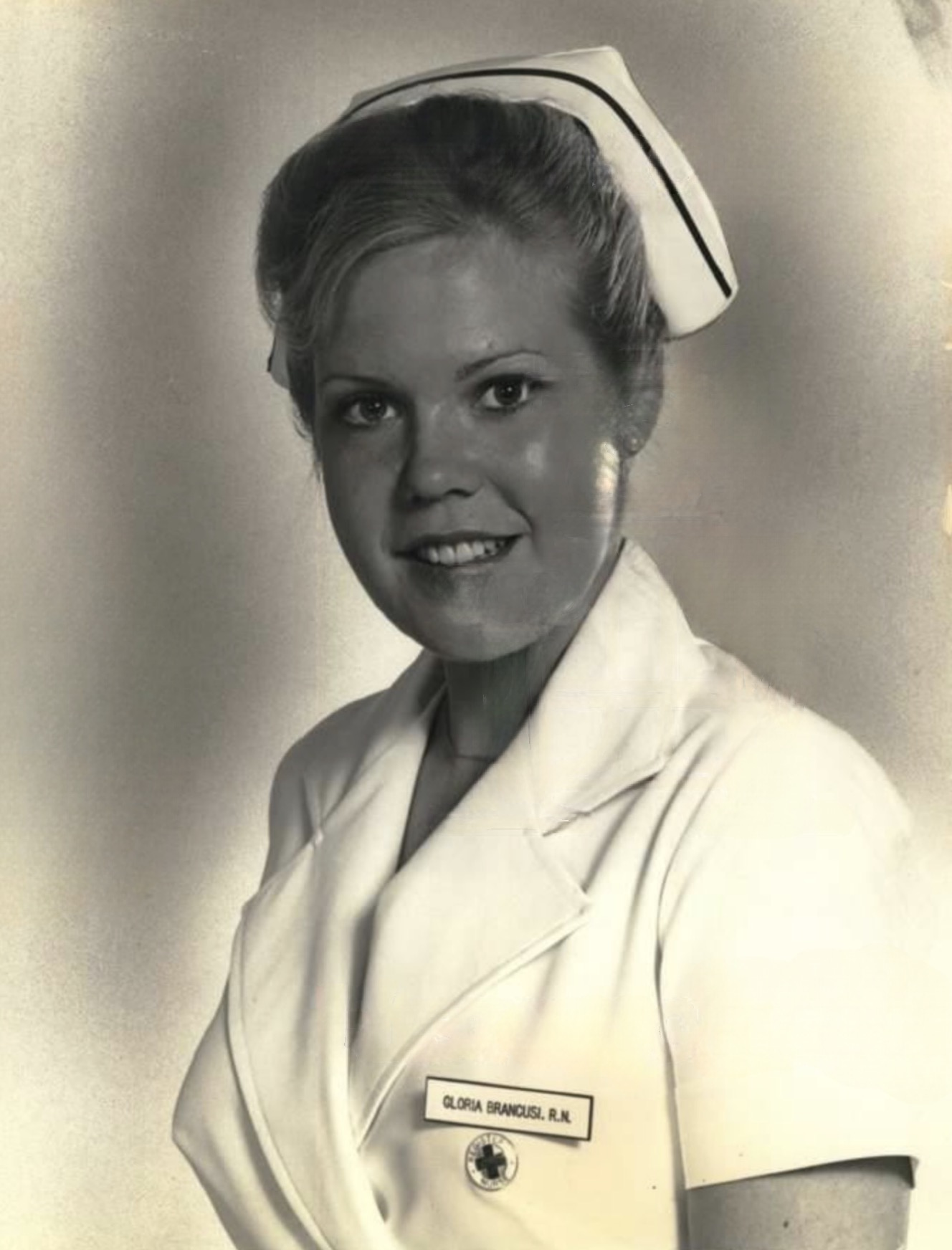
- Norris in Trapper John, M.D., 1979
- Born: October 7, 1953 (age 72)
- Education: Antioch University (BA)
- Occupation: Actress
- Years active: 1964–1999
- Spouse: Walter Danley (m. 1980; div. 1998)

Christopher Norris (born October 7, 1953) is an American former Broadway, film and television actress. She began acting on Broadway and is probably best known for her portrayal of nurse Gloria "Ripples" Brancusi in the television series Trapper John, M.D.. Early in pregnancy her parents picked the name "Christopher" and decided to name the baby that regardless of its sex. She attended Los Angeles Valley College and, in the 1990s, she broke from acting and graduated with a B.A. in psychology and theater from Antioch University.

Early notable roles include the wild girl Miriam in Summer of '42 (1971), a heroic young flight attendant in the disaster film Airport 1975 (1974), and as a hot girl in Roger Corman's Eat My Dust! (1976). Early in her career, Norris typically played wholesome, "girl next door" types, and, later in her career, she got more "vixen" type roles, including the role of loony Laura Simmons Asher on the daytime soap Santa Barbara. Her other daytime credits include Another World and Guiding Light.

In 1980, Norris married Walter Danley, a businessman and later mystery novelist. They divorced in 1998.

Due to their physical resemblance, Norris is frequently mistaken for Melanie Griffith. Because of this, Griffith was mistakenly interviewed in the 1990s by the British media about acting in Airport 1975.

She designed the exterior and interior of her home, and Christopher Norris nurse uniforms were designed, sold, and proceeds used for nursing scholarships.

== Filmography ==
=== Film ===
Year	Title	Role	Notes
1971	Summer of '42	Miriam	
1971	Lady Liberty	Lydia	Uncredited
1974	Airport 1975	Bette	
1974	Goodnight Jackie	Donna	
1976	Eat My Dust!	Darlene Kurtz	

=== Television ===
1967	Truman Capote's "The Thanksgiving Visitor"	Annabelle Conklin	TV film based on his short story
1968–1970	The Edge of Night	Sarah Louise Capice	3 episodes
1971	Mr and Mrs Bo Jo Jones	Julie Greher	ABC Movie of the Week
1973	The Great American Beauty Contest	Miss Utah	ABC Movie of the Week
1973	The Paul Lynde Show	Julie Cunningham	Season 1, Episode 26: Springtime for Paul
1974	Sons and Daughters	Lisa	2 episodes
1975	The Hatfields and the McCoys	Nancy McCoy	ABC Movie of the Week
1975	The Secrets of Isis	Dorothy Bieder	Season 1, Episode 11: No Drums, No Trumpets
1976	Wonder Woman	Gloria	Season 1, Episode 13: Wonder Woman in Hollywood
1977	Happy Days	Sheila	Season 4, Episode 24: The Last of the Big Time Malphs
1977	Forever Fernwood	Hortense	Episode #1.18
1978	Fantasy Island	Shirley Roberts	Season 2, Episode 6: War Games/Queen of the Boston Bruisers
1978	Barnaby Jones	June	Season 7, Episode 8: Stages of Fear
1979–1986	Trapper John, M.D.	Nurse Gloria “Ripples” Brancusi	132 episodes
1980	Gridlock	Linda Reinhardt	TV film (NBC)
1980	The Love Boat	Gail Pagett	Series 3, Episode 28: No girls for Doc/Marriage of convenience/The caller/The witness
1981	Aloha Paradise	Darcy Holtz	Season 1, Episode 5: The Best of Friends/Success/9 Carats
1982	The Love Boat	Angelica Franchini	Series 6, Episodes 1 & 2: The Italian Cruise: Venetian Love Song/Down for the Count/Arrividerci, Gopher/The Arrangement: Parts 1 & 2
1983–1988	Hotel	Carol Bowman/Helen Madison	4 episodes
1984	Finder of Lost Loves	Elisa/Eden Crawford	Season 1, Episode 3: Losing Touch
1986–1988	Murder, She Wrote	Pru Mattson/Denise Quinlan	2 episodes
1987	Matlock	Judy Benson	Season 2, Episode 5: The Husband
1987	The New Mike Hammer	Cynthia Stillman	Season 3, Episode 17: The Last Laugh
1989–1990	Santa Barbara	Laura Asher	185 episodes
1992	Guiding Light	Rebecca Nash	3 episodes
1998	Diagnosis: Murder	Karin Hatcher	Season 5, Episode 15: Drill for Death
1998–1999	Another World	Margaret Allen	9 episodes

=== Broadway ===
Year	Title	Role	Notes
1964	Roar Like a Dove	Jane	
1965–1966	The Playroom	Ellen	

=== Off Broadway ===
Year	Title	Role	Notes
1964	The Secret Life of Walter Mitty	Lorraine Serabian Peninnah	
