= Skyward (film) =

- Genre: Drama
- Written by: Nancy Sackett
- Story by: Anson Williams
- Directed by: Ron Howard
- Starring: Bette Davis; Howard Hesseman; Marion Ross; Clu Gulager; Lisa Whelchel; Suzy Gilstrap
- Music by: Lee Holdridge
- Country of origin: United States
- Original language: English

Production
- Executive producers: Anson Williams; Ron Howard
- Producer: John A. Kuri
- Cinematography: Robert Jessup
- Editor: Robert Kern Jr.
- Running time: 100 minutes
- Production companies: Anson Productions; Major H Productions

Original release
- Network: NBC
- Release: November 20, 1980

Skyward is a 1980 American made-for-television drama film starring Bette Davis, Howard Hesseman, Marion Ross, Suzy Gilstrap, Clu Gulager and Lisa Whelchel. It was directed by Ron Howard, written by Nancy Sackett and broadcast on NBC on November 20, 1980.

== Plot ==
Billie Dupree is a flight instructor at an old Texas airport. When a young girl in a wheelchair named Julie finds the airport by watching gliders fly, she decides she wants to learn how to fly. Dupree teaches her to fly with some special controls adapted for her disability. Koup Trenton is an aircraft repair service mechanic trying desperately to get an old airplane back in the air. The three, together, put the young girl and the old plane up in the air.

== Cast ==
- Bette Davis as Billie Dupree
- Howard Hesseman as Koup Trenton
- Marion Ross as Natalie Ward
- Clu Gulager as Steve Ward
- Ben Marley as Scott Billings
- Lisa Whelchel as Lisa Ward
- Suzy Gilstrap as Julie Ward
- Irma P. Hall as Mrs. Sinclair
- Mark Wheeler as Mr. Olsen
- Jessie Lee Fulton as Secretary
- Bill Thurman as Pilot #1
- Rance Howard as Pilot #2
- Rhonda Minton as Stephanie
- Gene Pietragallo as Jason
- Greta Blackburn as Miss Russell
- Jeff Nicholson as Theatre Usher
- Kate Finlayson as Nurse
- Rusty McCaskey as Boy In Class
- Charley French as Boy In Class
- Bill Blackwood as Himself

== Production ==
The film was set in Rockwall, Texas, with the plot centering on the town's airport, and partially filmed in the city and surrounding areas.

Director Ron Howard has credited this film as helping to convince studios that he could direct feature films. Getting General Electric to sponsor the film was a big step, and getting Bette Davis on board was also ambitious. Howard recalls that Bette Davis was initially concerned about Gilstrap's casting because she had no real acting experience. Davis referred to Howard as “Mr. Howard" at the beginning of the first day of filming, but he soon became "Ron," and she later highly complimented his work, telling him he could be another William Wyler.

Ron Howard reminisced: "On working with Bette Davis during the filming of 1980's "Skyward": "She didn't much like that there was this 25-year-old from a sitcom that was directing her. I was talking to her on the phone and I said, 'Well, Ms. Davis, I'll protect you as the director and make sure you're prepared and that your performance will not suffer,' and she said, 'I disagree, Mr. Howard.' I said, 'Ms. Davis, just call me Ron,' and she said, 'No, I will call you Mr. Howard until I decide whether I like you or not.' And then (on the set) I gave her a note. And she tried it, and it worked for her. She said, 'You're right, that works much better. Let's shoot.' And at the end of the whole thing, I said, 'Well, Ms. Davis, great first day. I'll see you tomorrow."' She said, 'Okay, Ron, see you tomorrow,'" and she patted me on the ass."

== Reception ==
John J. O'Connor of The New York Times opined that G.E. Theater, "an indefatigable supplier of upbeat dramas," had "clearly found itself another hefty dose of safe inspiration" in this film. But he did credit the casting of paraplegic teenager Suzy Gilstrap in the lead role, as well as the casting of Bette Davis and Howard Hesseman. Tom Shales of The Washington Post called the movie "one sweet piece of work" and a "lyrical heartwarmer."

The movie was the 16th ranked prime time television show in the United States for the week of its release, with a 22.0 Nielsen rating.

The movie's success led to a one-hour Christmas special directed by Vincent McEveety in December 1981 called Skyward Christmas. Though Gilstrap reprised her role as Julie, the cast was largely new and the production generally received poor reviews.
