= Eat My Dust! =

1976 film by Charles B. Griffith

- Directed by: Charles B. Griffith
- Written by: Charles B. Griffith
- Produced by: Roger Corman
- Starring: Ron Howard; Christopher Norris; Brad David
- Cinematography: Eric Saarinen
- Edited by: Tina Hirsch
- Music by: David Grisman
- Distributed by: New World Pictures
- Release date: April 7, 1976
- Running time: 89 minutes
- Country: United States
- Language: English
- Budget: $300,000
- Box office: $5.5 million (Note: Figures are for rentals in US and Canada)

Eat My Dust! (Note: The exclamation point does not appear in the title onscreen, but was included in promotional materials) is a 1976 American action comedy film written and directed by Charles B. Griffith and starring Ron Howard. The film depicts a conflict between a sheriff and his rebellious son over a stolen car.

== Plot ==
When the clean-cut but rebellious son of a small-town sheriff steals the race car of a professional driver, the sheriff forms a motorized posse to recover the car.

== Cast ==
- Ron Howard as Hoover Niebold
- Christopher Norris as Darlene Kurtz
- Brad David as Billy B. Westerby
- Kathy O'Dare as Miranda Smith
- Clint Howard as George Poole Jr.
- Peter Isacksen as Junior Hale
- Jessica Potter as Lallie Chandler
- Warren J. Kemmerling as Sheriff Harry Niebold
- Charles Howerton as Deputy Jay Beah
- Kedric Wolfe as Deputy Brookside
- John Kramer as Deputy Sebastiani
- W.L. Luckey as Deputy Jerry Gallo
- Rance Howard as Deputy Clark
- Dave Madden as Bubba "Big Bubba" Jones
- Robert Broyles as Bud
- Paul Bartel as Bruno Smith
- Corbin Bernsen as Roy Puire
- Don Brodie as Old Man Lewis

== Production ==
The movie was originally called The Car. It was Charles B. Griffith's first film as director since Forbidden Island (1959), although he had directed as second unit on a number of movies such as The Young Racers, The She Beast, and Death Race 2000; the last had been a huge hit for Roger Corman.

Corman offered the lead role of the film to Ron Howard, who was nationally famous from the TV series Happy Days. He sent Howard a script, with the offer of a fee of $75,000. The actor read it on the set of Happy Days and "thought it was terrible: a broad, zany car-chase comedy with weak jokes and cardboard characters." Howard wanted to move into directing, though, and knew that Roger Corman might be able to help him do that. He had written a comedy with his father, called Tis the Season, about a student who rents a room in a massage parlor, and raised half the budget from Australia. Howard met with Corman and agreed to star in Eat My Dust! provided the producer agreed to co-finance Tis the Season. Corman was not enthusiastic about the comedy, but said if Howard appeared in Eat My Dust!, he would let the actor develop a second film which Howard might be able to direct, as well as star in. According to Howard, Corman said:

I like to think I turn out directors the way USC turns out running backs for the NFL.... Here's the deal: I won't promise you that you'll direct the movie, but I promise you that you can write an outline for another script if you act in Eat My Dust, and if I like it, I'll develop it. And if I like it enough and you're willing to be in it, you can direct it. If all that fails, here's my promise: I'll let you direct second unit on one of my action movies.

Howard agreed to star in Eat My Dust!. The movie was shot around Howard's schedule for Happy Days. Corman agreed to finance Ron Howard's idea for a film which became Grand Theft Auto (1977), Howard's directorial debut.

Charles Griffith directed the film, which was shot in four weeks, although Howard's scenes were done in only 10 days. It was originally titled The Car, and Griffith says he only suggested Eat My Dust! as a joke, but the marketing department at New World loved it. Barbara Peeters shot second unit.

Howard claims his brother and father were cast in the movie solely due to Charles Griffith, not himself.

Howard recalled "making the movie damn near killed me" because he was also cast in The Shootist and had to make Happy Days. Production was scheduled so Howard could film all his scenes in 11 days. Filming took place near Lake Piru. He later wrote, "I was wrong to have been so haughty about deigning to star in Eat My Dust! I learned a lot from observing Chuck Griffith's fast, nimble, low-budget approach to filmmaking, and I just liked the indie vibe around the Corman machine."

Charles Griffith enjoyed working with Howard, claiming the actor "fit the script perfectly, and he played the script. That stuff about 'My dad named me Hoover because I put him in a Depression' he did just so smoothly, and the picture got a lot of laughs."

== Release ==
The film premiered on April 7, 1976, in San Antonio. It then opened in 100 theatres in Texas on April 23, 1976.

The trailer was edited by Allan Arkush and Joe Dante.

== Reception ==
=== Box office ===
The film was a big hit. Corman said it was the first New World movie to earn $5 million in rentals. (It was later beaten by The Private Eyes and The Prize Fighter.)

=== Critical ===
The Los Angeles Times called it "virtually nothing but a chase" with "some very ugly aspects" including suggesting "that everyone over 21 is a hypocrite or a fool or both and above all that everyone—and everything—is for the taking."

Howard wrote "Eat My Dust! turned out well for a film called Eat My Dust! It was a quick, zany car-chase flick."

TV Guide gave the movie two out of five stars, calling it below par, finding the movie enjoyable but mindless.

Griffith later wrote and directed another car film for Corman, Smokey Bites the Dust (1981).
