= The Shrinking of Treehorn =

1971 picture book by Florence Parry Heide

- Author: Florence Parry Heide
- Illustrator: Edward Gorey
- Genre: Children
- Publisher: Holiday House
- Publication date: 1971
- Pages: 63
- ISBN: 0-8234-0189-8
- OCLC: 277918
- Dewey Decimal: [E]
- LC Class: PZ7.H36 Sh
- Followed by: Treehorn's Treasure

The Shrinking of Treehorn is a children's book by Florence Parry Heide, illustrated by Edward Gorey, and first published in 1971. The main character in the book is Treehorn, whose parents barely notice when he shrinks.

== Plot ==
Treehorn is a young boy who begins shrinking one day. The book opens with the line "Something very strange was happening to Treehorn," and the boy soon discovers that he is getting smaller when he cannot reach the candy bars and bubble gum he has hidden on a previously accessible shelf. When his parents comment on it, they say, "Maybe he's doing it on purpose, just to be different." In the end, Treehorn returns to his normal size. It transpires that his shrinking was caused by playing a board game. The same game later helps him to return to normal size.

== Sequels ==
The sequel to this book is Treehorn's Treasure (1981), followed by Treehorn's Wish (1984). The three books were collected in an omnibus edition, The Treehorn Trilogy, in 2006.

== Film adaptation ==
In June 2019, an animated film adaptation directed by Ron Howard was said to be in development. The animation would be done by Animal Logic and distributed by Paramount Pictures under its Paramount Animation label. By April 9, 2021, the film's release date was scheduled for November 10, 2023. However, on May 16, 2022, it was announced that the film had been acquired by Netflix with Howard's Imagine Entertainment as its production studio.
