= Florence Parry Heide =

American writer

- Born: Florence Fisher Parry; February 27, 1919; Pittsburgh, Pennsylvania, USA
- Died: October 23, 2011 (aged 92)
- Writing career
- Pen name: Alex B. Allen (jointly with different co-authors)
- Genre: Children's literature

Florence Parry Heide (February 27, 1919 – October 23, 2011) was an author of children's books in the United States.

== Early life ==
Born in Pittsburgh, Heide spent most of her childhood in Punxsutawney, Pennsylvania. Her father, who was a banker, died when Heide was two years old. After two years of studying at Wilson College in Chambersburg, Pennsylvania, she transferred to UCLA, graduating in 1939. She worked in advertising and public relations in New York City before returning to Pittsburgh during World War II and became publicity director of The Pittsburgh Playhouse. She met her husband, Donald C. Heide, in October, 1943. They married six weeks later, on November 27, 1943.

After the war, she and her husband moved to Kenosha, Wisconsin. He began a private law practice where he worked until his retirement in 1982. She devoted herself to her children and began her career as a children's author after all five of them were in school.

Her five children include authors Judith Heide Gilliland and Roxanne Heide Pierce, with whom she co-wrote several other books. She had eight grandchildren and four great-grandchildren.

== Writing career ==
Her first book, Maximilian, was published in 1967. She published more than 100 books for children and youth – from picture books to adolescent novels – and several collections of poetry. She collaborated with Sylvia Van Clief to write hundreds of songs and several books.

Her best-known works are a series of books about the adventures of a boy named Treehorn, which includes the titles The Shrinking of Treehorn (1971), Treehorn's Treasure (1981), and Treehorn’s Wish (1986), all of which were illustrated by Edward Gorey. Sound of Sunshine, Sound of Rain (1970) was adapted as an animated short in 1983, which was nominated for an Academy Award for Best Animated Short Film. She worked with illustrators Jules Feiffer, Lane Smith and Sergio Ruzzier, and won awards for her work. Under the pen name Alex B. Allen, Heide and at least two co-authors contributed texts to the illustrated Springboard sports series published by Albert Whitman of Chicago.

== Parade ==
Heide was known in Kenosha for the Fourth of July parade she organized each year. Hundreds of children with their bikes decorated would gather outside her home and ride twice around her block to the beat of a drum. The parade continues each year in her honor.

== Honors ==
She received an honorary degree from Carthage College in 1979.

== Death ==
Heide died in her sleep on October 23, 2011. Upon her death, she gifted a large portion of her personal collection of children's books to the Center for Children's Literature at Carthage College.
