= Sister Act (franchise) =

Film franchise

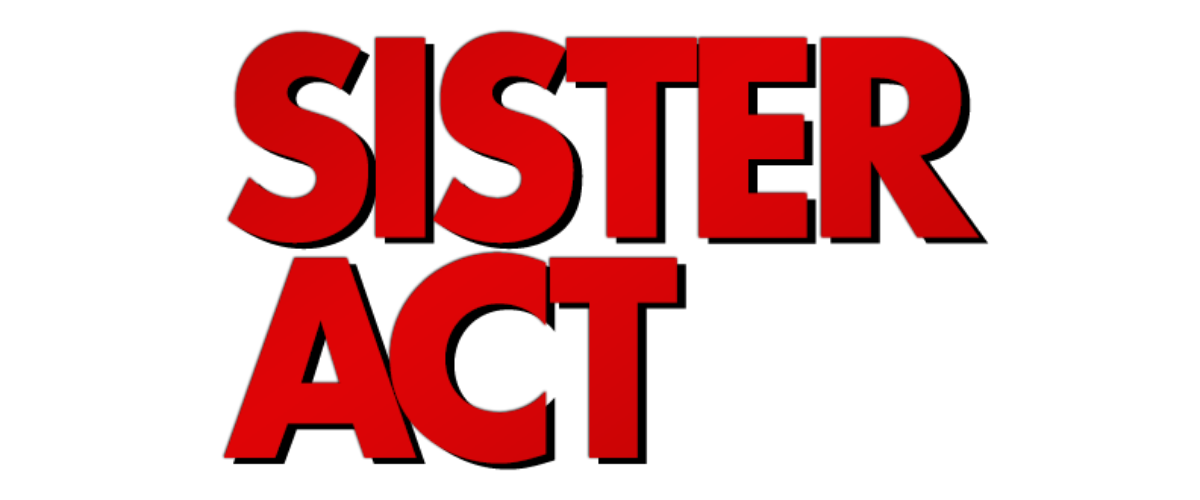
- Logo used since 1992
- Created by: Paul Rudnick
- Original work: Sister Act (1992)
- Owner: The Walt Disney Company
- Years: 1992–present

Films and television
- Films: Sister Act (1992); Sister Act 2: Back in the Habit (1993)

Theatrical presentations
- Musical: Sister Act

Audio
- Soundtracks: Sister Act; Sister Act 2: Back in the Habit

Sister Act is an American media franchise created by Paul Rudnick, currently consisting of two films – Sister Act (1992) and Sister Act 2: Back in the Habit (1993) – and a Broadway musical.

== Films ==
=== Sister Act (1992) ===
When a lively lounge singer Deloris Van Cartier (Whoopi Goldberg) sees her mobster beau, Vince LaRocca (Harvey Keitel), commit murder, she is relocated for her protection. Set up in the guise of a nun in a California convent, Deloris proceeds to upend the quiet lives of the resident sisters. In an effort to keep her out of trouble, they assign Deloris to the convent's choir, an ensemble that she soon turns into a vibrant and soulful act that gains widespread attention.

=== Sister Act 2: Back in the Habit (1993) ===
In the sequel, Las Vegas performer Deloris Van Cartier (Whoopi Goldberg) is surprised by a visit from her nun friends, including Sister Mary Patrick (Kathy Najimy) and Sister Mary Lazarus (Mary Wickes). She soon finds out that she is needed in her nun guise as Sister Mary Clarence to help teach music to teens at a troubled school in hopes of keeping the facility from closing at the hands of Mr. Crisp (James Coburn), a callous administrator.

== Future ==
=== Possible remake (TBA) ===
On June 3, 2015, a remake was confirmed to be in the works with Legally Blonde screenwriters Kirsten Smith and Karen McCullah writing.

=== Sister Act 3 (TBA) ===
When asked in a 2013 appearance on Watch What Happens Live about acting in a sequel, Whoopi Goldberg initially refused, citing the passing of so many of her nun co-stars, stating "it's not Sister Act without them." But during a 2015 appearance on Watch What Happens Live, she changed her stance to a maybe, stating:

I generally say no to that, because so many of the nuns have passed and it just wouldn't feel right for me. I'm kind of old for it now. That's not to say I wouldn't do it, but it feels like there's a new generation for Sister Act and so maybe I can be a nun now.

After a Broad City cameo in 2016, Goldberg expressed doubts about a sequel based on missing cast members, but said she thought it would be fun and likable. In May 2017, she affirmed her desire for the third film to happen, adding in July that she would like to direct it and had confidence it would be made. On December 7, 2018, it was confirmed that Regina Y. Hicks and Karin Gist were hired to write the script to Sister Act 3 with it being planned for a release on Disney+. Goldberg confirmed again on October 7, 2020, during an appearance on The Late Late Show with James Corden that she is working on the sequel and wants to bring as many of the original cast back for it as possible.

In December 2020, it was revealed that Goldberg had officially signed on to return as Deloris and that Tyler Perry would be producing and directing the film.

On the October 6, 2022 episode of The View, actress Kathy Najimy stated that she had not heard anything formal about Sister Act 3; but that she had "heard rumblings about it." When she asked Whoopi Goldberg if Sister Act 3 was actually happening, Goldberg replied: "It's happening"; but did not publicly include or invite Najimy to be a part of it as she had with Jenifer Lewis and Tyler Perry live on the show days earlier. Goldberg did imply that Hocus Pocus 2 did help in getting Sister Act 3 the greenlight.

In October 2023, Goldberg traveled to Rome to meet Pope Francis at St. Peter's Square in Vatican City in preparation for the film. On February 7, 2024, Sheryl Lee Ralph, who played Florence Watson in the second film, confirmed that she would be reprising her role in the third film. Later that same month, Tyler Perry confirmed that the script was still being worked on. However, following the September 27, 2024 passing of Maggie Smith, who played the Mother Superior in the films, Whoopi Goldberg confirmed in November 2024 during an appearance on The Tonight Show with Jimmy Fallon that the script was being readjusted to accommodate story changes. In March 2025, Goldberg confirmed that the script for the film is completed and that they're waiting for Disney to give the film the greenlight.

=== Reworked musical ===
A reworked version of the musical is expected to debut at the Curve, Leicester starring Brenda Edwards and produced by Whoopi Goldberg and Jamie Wilson.

== Other media ==
=== Musical ===
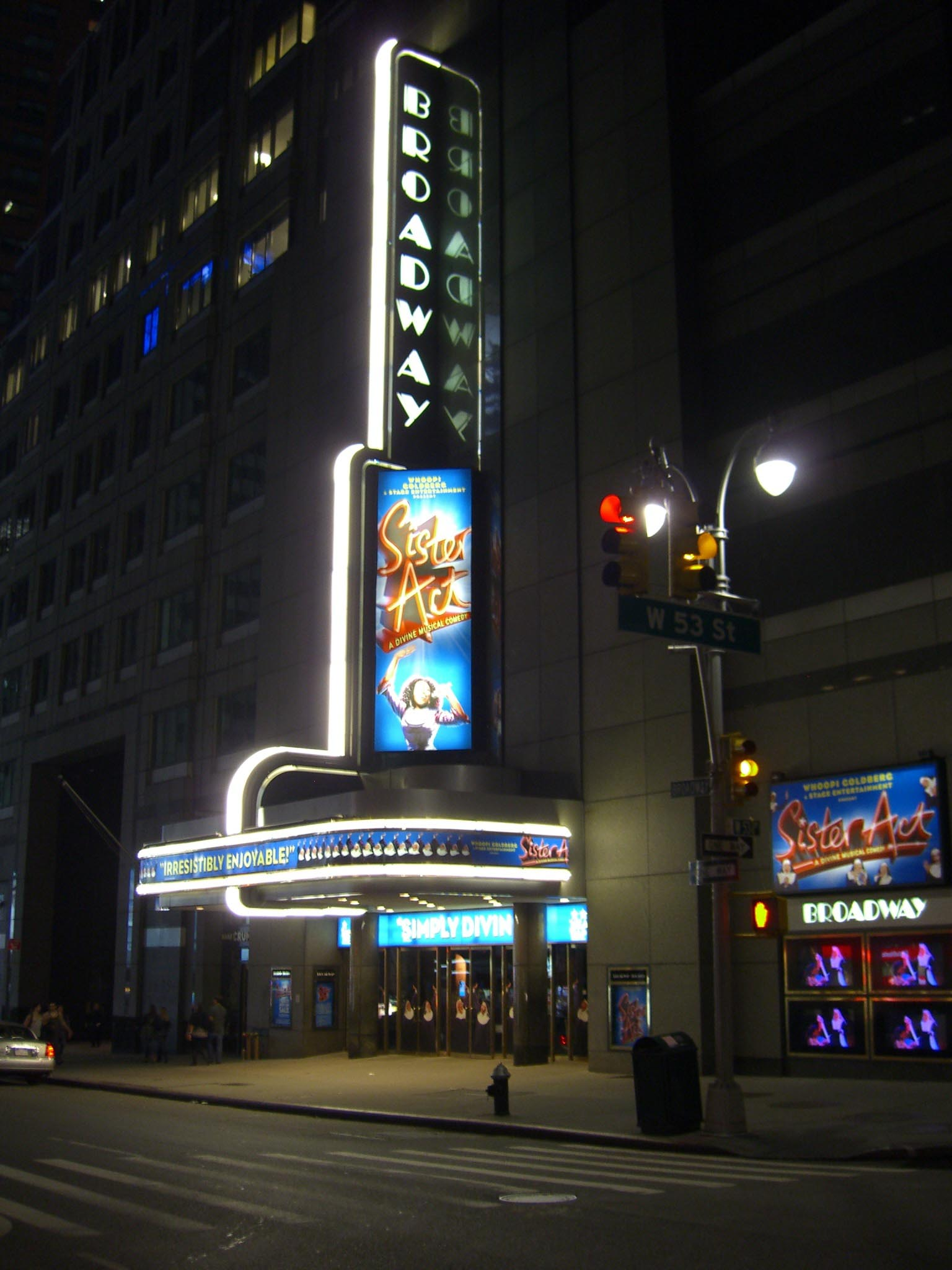
A play based on the film plays at The Broadway Theatre in Times Square, Manhattan, beginning in 2011

The musical Sister Act, directed by Peter Schneider and choreographed by Marguerite Derricks, premiered at the Pasadena Playhouse in Pasadena, California on October 24, 2006 and closed on December 23, 2006. It broke records, grossing $1,085,929 to become the highest grossing show ever at that venue. The production then moved to the Alliance Theater in Atlanta, Georgia, where it ran from January 17 to February 25, 2007.

The musical then opened at the West End at the London Palladium on June 2, 2009, following previews from May 7. The production was directed by Peter Schneider produced by Whoopi Goldberg together with the Dutch company Stage Entertainment, and choreographed by Anthony Van Laast, with set design by Klara Zieglerova, costume design by Lez Brotherston, and lighting design by Natasha Katz. Following a year-long search, 24-year-old actress Patina Miller was cast as Deloris, alongside Sheila Hancock as the Mother Superior, Ian Lavender as Monsignor Howard, Chris Jarman as Shank, Ako Mitchell as Eddie, Katie Rowley Jones as Sister Mary Robert, Claire Greenway as Sister Mary Patrick, and Julia Sutton as Sister Mary Lazarus. The musical received four Laurence Olivier Awards nominations including Best Musical. On October 30, 2010, the show played its final performance at the London Palladium and transferred to Broadway.

The musical opened at the Broadway Theater on April 20, 2011, with previews beginning March 24, 2011. Jerry Zaks directed the Broadway production with Douglas Carter Bean rewriting the book. Patina Miller, who originated the role of Deloris in the West End production, reprised her role, making her Broadway debut. She was later replaced by Raven-Symoné, also making her Broadway debut. The original Broadway cast featured Victoria Clark (Mother Superior), Fred Applegate (Monsignor), Sarah Bolt, (Sister Mary Patrick), Chester Gregory (Eddie), Kingsley Leggs (Curtis), Marla Mindelle (Sister Mary Robert), and Audrie Neenan (Sister Mary Lazarus). The musical received five Tony Award nominations including Best Musical.

The musical closed in August 2012 after playing 561 performances.

== Cast and characters ==
List indicators

This section includes characters who will appear or have appeared in more than two films in the series.

- An empty grey cell indicates the character was not in the film, or that the character's official presence has not yet been confirmed.
- ^{Y} indicates a younger version of the character.
- ^{S} indicates an appearance as a character's singing voice.

Characters	Films		Musical (2006–present)								
Characters	Sister Act (1992)	Sister Act 2: Back in the Habit (1993)	West End (2009)	Broadway (2011)	1st UK Tour (2011)	1st US Tour (2012)	2nd US tour (2014)	2nd UK tour (2016)	Manchester (2022)	London (2022)	3rd UK tour (2022)
Deloris Wilson/Delores Van Cartier/Sister Mary Clarence	Whoopi Goldberg Isis Carmen Jones^{Y}	Whoopi Goldberg	Patina Miller	Patina Miller Raven-Symoné (replacement)	Cynthia Erivo	Ta'Rea Campbell	Kerissa Arrington	Alexandra Burke	Sandra Marvin	Beverley Knight	Sandra Marvin
Reverend Mother Superior	Maggie Smith	Maggie Smith	Sheila Hancock Whoopi Goldberg (replacement) Sally Dexter (replacement)	Victoria Clark Carolee Carmello (replacement)	Denise Black	Hollis Resnik Lynne Wintersteller (replacement)	Maggie Clennon Reberg	Karen Mann	Jennifer Saunders	Jennifer Saunders	Lesley Joseph
Sister Mary Patrick	Kathy Najimy	Kathy Najimy	Claire Greenway	Sarah Bolt	Laurie Scarth	Florie Bagel	Sarah Michelle Cuc	Susannah Van Den Berg	Keala Settle	Keala Settle	Catherine Millson
Sister Mary Robert	Wendy Makkena Andrea Robinson^{S}	Wendy Makkena Andrea Robinson^{S}	Katie Rowley Jones	Marla Mindelle	Julie Atherton	Lael Van Keuren	Emily Kay Schrader	Sarah Goggin	Lizzie Bea	Lizzie Bea	Lizzie Bea
Sister Mary Lazarus	Mary Wickes	Mary Wickes	Julia Sutton	Audrie J. Neenan	Jacqueline Clark	Diane J. Findlay	Nancy Evans	Rosemary Ashe	Lesley Joseph	Lesley Joseph	Anne Smith
Lt. Eddie Souther	Bill Nunn		Ako Mitchell	Chester Gregory	Edward Baruwa	E. Clayton Cornelious Chester Gregory (replacement)	Lamont O'Neal	Jon Robyns	Clive Rowe	Clive Rowe	Clive Rowe
Vince LaRocca	Harvey Keitel										
Joey/Bones	Robert Miranda		Nicolas Colicos	John Treacy Egan	Daniel Stockton	Todd A. Horman	F. Tyler Burnet	Samuel Morgan-Grahame	Tom Hopcroft	Tom Hopcroft	Tom Hopcroft
Willy	Richard Portnow										
Sister Alma	Rose Parenti										
Monsignor Bishop O'Hara/Howard	Joseph Maher		Ian Lavender	Fred Applegate	Michael Starke	Richard Pruitt	Gordon Gray	Tim Maxwell-Clarke	Graham Mcduff	Graham Mcduff	Graham Mcduff
Clarkson	Jim Beaver										
Michelle	Jenifer Lewis										
Tina	Charlotte Crossley										
Lewanda	A.J. Johnson										
Immaculata	Lois de Banzie										
Ernie	Max Grodenchik										
Henry Parker	Joseph G. Medalis										
Larry Merrick	Michael Durrell										
Connie LaRocca	Toni Kalem										
Pope John Paul II	Eugene Greytak										
Detective Tate	Guy Boyd										
Father Maurice		Barnard Hughes									
Mr. Crisp		James Coburn									
Father Ignatius		Michael Jeter									
Florence Watson		Sheryl Lee Ralph									
Joey Bustamente		Robert Pastorelli									
Father Wolfgang		Thomas Gottschalk									
Rita Louise Watson		Lauryn Hill									
Father Thomas		Brad Sullivan									
Maria		Alanna Ubach									
Ahmal		Ryan Toby									
Sketch		Ron Johnson									
Margaret		Jennifer Love Hewitt									
Frankie		Devin Kamin									
Tyler Chase		Christian Fitzharris									
Tanya		Tanya Blount									
Marcos		Mehran Marcos Sedghi									
Curtis Jackson/Shank			Chris Jarman Simon Webbe (replacement)	Kingsley Leggs	Cavin Cornwall	Kingsley Leggs	Kolby Kindle	Aaron Lee Lambert	Jeremy Secomb	Jeremy Secomb	Jeremy Secomb
TJ			Thomas Goodridge	Demond Green	Tyrone Huntley	Charles Thomas	Lawrence Dandridge	Sandy Grigelis	Bradley Judge	Bradley Judge	Bradley Judge
Pablo/Dinero			Ivan De Freitas	Caesar Samayoa	Gavin Alex	Ernie Pruneda	Nicholas Alexander Rodriguez	Ricky Rojas	Damian Buhagiar	Damian Buhagiar	Damian Buhagiar

== Crew ==
Crew/Detail	Sister Act (1992)	Sister Act 2: Back in the Habit (1993)
Director	Emile Ardolino	Bill Duke
Producer(s)	Scott Rudin; Teri Schwartz	Scott Rudin; Dawn Steel
Writer(s)	Joseph Howard	James Orr; Jim Cruickshank; Judi Ann Mason
Cinematographer(s)	Adam Greenberg	Oliver Wood
Composer	Marc Shaiman	Marc Shaiman; Miles Goodman
Running time	100 minutes	107 minutes

== Reception ==
=== Box office performance ===
Film	Release date	Box office gross				Box office ranking		Budget	Ref(s)
Film	Release date	United States opening weekend	North America	Other territories	Worldwide	All time North America	All time worldwide	Budget	Ref(s)
Sister Act	May 29, 1992	$11,894,587	$139,605,150	$92,000,000	$231,605,150	#454	—N/a	$31 million	
Sister Act 2: Back in the Habit	December 10, 1993	$7,569,219	$57,319,029	$67,300,000	$125,619,029	#1,552	—N/a	$38 million	
Totals			$196,924,179	$159,300,000	$357,224,179			$69 million	—N/a

=== Critical and public response ===
Film	Critical		Public
Film	Rotten Tomatoes	Metacritic	CinemaScore
Sister Act	75% (28 reviews)	51 (23 reviews)	A
Sister Act 2: Back in the Habit	18% (38 reviews)	38 (23 reviews)	A−
