= Sister Act =

1992 film by Emile Ardolino

- Theatrical release poster
- Directed by: Emile Ardolino
- Written by: Paul Rudnick (as Joseph Howard)
- Produced by: Teri Schwartz
- Starring: Whoopi Goldberg; Maggie Smith; Harvey Keitel
- Cinematography: Adam Greenberg
- Edited by: Colleen Halsey; Richard Halsey
- Music by: Marc Shaiman
- Production companies: Touchstone Pictures; Touchwood Pacific Partners I
- Distributed by: Buena Vista Pictures Distribution
- Release date: May 29, 1992
- Running time: 100 minutes
- Country: United States
- Language: English
- Budget: $31 million
- Box office: $231.6 million

Sister Act is a 1992 American musical crime comedy film directed by Emile Ardolino and written by Paul Rudnick (billed as Joseph Howard). It stars Whoopi Goldberg as a lounge singer forced to hide in a convent after being placed in a witness protection program. It also features Maggie Smith, Kathy Najimy, Wendy Makkena, Mary Wickes, and Harvey Keitel.

Receiving mixed to favorable reviews, Sister Act was one of the most financially successful comedies of the early 1990s, grossing $231.6 million worldwide against a $31 million budget. Its success extended to the home video market, and it was the most rented film of 1993 in the United States. The film spawned a franchise, which consists of the 1993 sequel Sister Act 2: Back in the Habit and a musical adaptation, which premiered in 2006. A third film is in development for Disney+.

== Plot ==
Deloris Wilson, a young student at a catholic school in San Francisco, California, is making a scene in class as she is ordered by her teacher, a nun, to write the names of the Apostles on the blackboard, but instead writes the names of famous musicians (John, Paul, George, Elvis). The nun chastises Deloris and says "have you any idea what girls like you would become?!", which transitions to an adult Deloris, now a lounge singer performing under the stage name Deloris Van Cartier in a club in Reno, Nevada, who struggles with her career as she engages in an affair with the club's married owner, gangster Vince LaRocca. After receiving a shallow gift she recognizes belongs to Vince's wife, she attempts to return it, only to witness him murder an informant. Concerned she is a liability, Vince orders his men to eliminate her, forcing Deloris to escape and seek help from the Reno Police Department. Lieutenant Eddie Souther, who sees Deloris' information as important in bringing down Vince, places her in witness protection, and brings her to the struggling convent of Saint Katherine's Parish, located in a run-down San Francisco neighborhood. While Deloris and the convent's head nun, the Reverend Mother, object to this arrangement, Souther and the parish priest of St. Katherine's, Monsignor O'Hara, convince them to go along with the proposal; in particular, because Souther promises to compensate the convent financially for their assistance.

Disguised as "Sister Mary Clarence", Deloris initially has difficulty dealing with the rigid and simple convent life and butts heads with Reverend Mother, but finds herself befriending the other nuns, including the optimistic and upbeat Sister Mary Patrick, the elderly deadpan Sister Mary Lazarus, and the shy young Novice Sister Mary Robert. One night, after a poorly attended Sunday Mass — caused by the lackluster performance from the convent's choir, led by Mary Lazarus — Deloris decides she needs a break and sneaks out to a bar, unintentionally causing Mary Patrick and Mary Robert to follow her. After they are discovered by the Reverend Mother, she initially considers kicking Deloris out, but instead orders her to join the struggling choir. With her singing experience, Deloris is elected to take over as their director and transforms the choir.

At the next Sunday Mass, Deloris leads the much-improved choir in a traditional hymn of "Hail Holy Queen", then shifts into a combined gospel and rock and roll interpretation. Although Reverend Mother is infuriated, Monsignor O'Hara congratulates the choir for their unorthodox performance, as new people were attracted to the service. Convinced by Deloris (who cleverly credits Reverend Mother with the idea), he allows the nuns to clean the church and help revitalize the neighborhood. Their singing and efforts attract media attention, and the parish thrives.

Meanwhile, Vince has placed a bounty on Deloris's head and is intent on finding her. Souther chastises Deloris for nearly being exposed on national TV. She assures him she will try to keep a lower profile, and Souther attends a Mass. The choir continues to amaze parishioners and visitors, especially with a rendition of "My Guy" – rewritten and performed as "My God".

O'Hara informs the convent that Pope John Paul II, having heard of the choir's success, will visit the church and would like to hear them perform. Deloris tells Reverend Mother that Vince's upcoming trial means she will soon leave; the Mother reveals she has resigned as abbess, believing she is no longer useful to the convent as her authority was unintentionally undermined. Deloris tries to convince her to stay and keep the parish thriving as it is, but the Mother retorts that she believes herself too old-fashioned and incapable of doing so.

Souther discovers a corrupt detective in his own department who has disclosed Deloris's location to Vince and rushes to San Francisco to warn her. Though he arrives in time, Deloris insists on staying, feeling a sense of responsibility to her friends in the convent. Vince's men kidnap Deloris and Mary Robert, but Deloris helps Mary Robert escape. When Mary Robert returns to the convent, Reverend Mother reveals Deloris's true identity to the nuns and explains why she had been hiding in their convent. The nuns decide to rescue Deloris, and Reverend Mother leads them in guilt tripping a local helicopter pilot into giving them a ride to Reno.

In Reno, Vince orders his men to kill Deloris, but they cannot bring themselves to shoot her while she is dressed in a nun's habit. Arriving at the casino, the nuns find Deloris after she escapes Vince's men and try to sneak her out, but are cornered by Vince and his entourage in the lounge. Deloris prepares to sacrifice herself, but Vince's men still refuse to shoot her. Vince is hesitant himself, but works up the courage to shoot her. He hesitates just long enough for Souther to shoot him in the arm and arrest him and his men.

Thanking Deloris for her actions, Reverend Mother decides to remain as abbess. Returning to San Francisco, the choir, led by Deloris, sings "I Will Follow Him" to a packed audience in a refurbished Saint Katherine's, receiving a standing ovation from all including Reverend Mother, the Pope, Monsignor O'Hara, and Souther. Deloris continues to guide and coach the choir as a touring musical group.

During the closing credits, the group sings a cover of the Isley Brothers' "Shout".

== Cast ==
- Whoopi Goldberg as Deloris Wilson-Van Cartier / Sister Mary Clarence
  - Isis Carmen Jones as Young Deloris Wilson
- Maggie Smith as Mother Superior
- Harvey Keitel as Vince LaRocca
- Bill Nunn as Lieutenant Eddie Souther
- Mary Wickes as Sister Mary Lazarus
- Kathy Najimy as Sister Mary Patrick
- Wendy Makkena as Sister Mary Robert (singing voice: Andrea Robinson)
- Joseph Maher as Monsignor O'Hara
- Richard Portnow as Willy
- Robert Miranda as Joey
- Rose Parenti as Sister Alma
- Jenifer Lewis as Michelle
- Charlotte Crossley as Tina
- Jim Beaver as Clarkson
- A.J. Johnson as Lewanda
- Lois de Banzie as Immaculata
- Max Grodénchik as Ernie
- Joseph G. Medalis as Henry Parker
- Michael Durrell as Larry Merrick
- Toni Kalem as Connie LaRocca
- Eugene Greytak as Pope John Paul II
- Guy Boyd (uncredited) as Detective Tate

Choir nuns

- Pat Crawford Brown
- Susan Browning
- Georgia Creighton
- Edith Diaz
- Ellen Albertini Dow
- Beth Fowler
- Prudence Wright Holmes
- Sheri Izzard
- Susan Johnson
- Ruth Kobart
- Darlene Koldenhoven
- Carmen Zapata

== Production ==
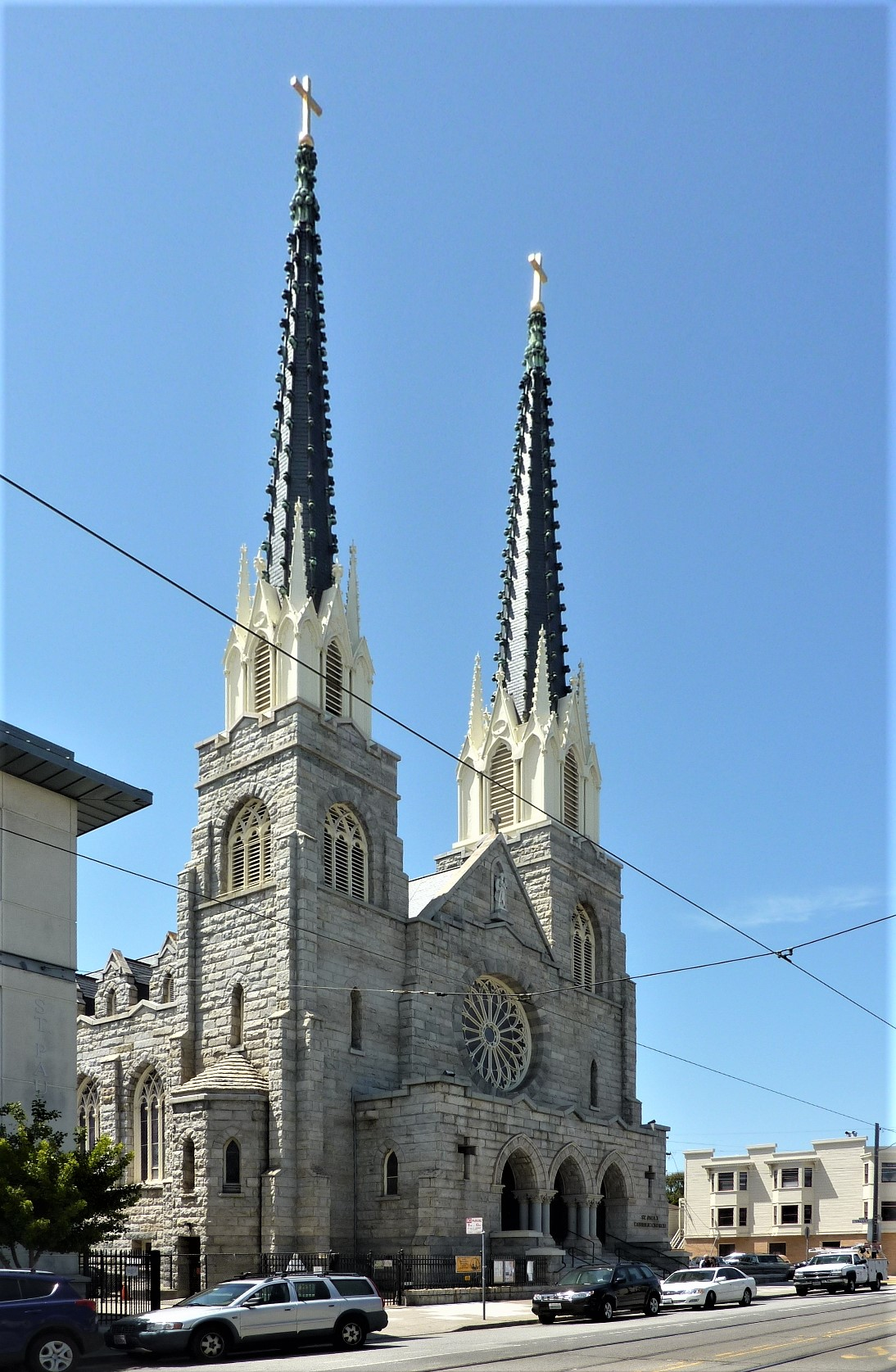
St. Paul's Catholic Church in San Francisco, used in the film as Saint Katherine's

Screenwriter Paul Rudnick pitched Sister Act to producer Scott Rudin in 1987, with Bette Midler in mind for the lead role. The script was brought to Disney. However, Midler turned down the role, fearing that her fans would not want to see her play a nun. Eventually, Whoopi Goldberg signed on to play the lead. As production commenced, the script was rewritten by a half dozen screenwriters, including Carrie Fisher, Robert Harling, and Nancy Meyers. With the movie no longer resembling his original script, Rudnick asked to be credited with a pseudonym in the film, deciding on Joseph Howard.

The church in which Deloris takes sanctuary is St. Paul's Catholic Church, located at Valley and Church Streets in Noe Valley, an upper-middle-class neighborhood of San Francisco. The storefronts on the opposite side of the street were redressed to give the appearance of a run-down neighborhood. Filming took place from September 23, 1991 to December 20, 1991.

Though the order of the nuns in the film is said to be a Carmelite one, their religious habit worn by Sister Mary Patrick is similar in appearance to that of the Sisters of St. Joseph of the Third Order of St. Francis (minus the cross). Members of the real-life Order, however, no longer wear their traditional habit.

== Soundtrack ==
The film's soundtrack was released by Hollywood Records on June 9, 1992, in conjunction with the film, and contained the musical numbers performed by actors in the film itself, pre-recorded songs that were used as part of the background music, and instrumental music composed by Marc Shaiman for the film. The soundtrack album debuted at #74 and eventually reached #40 on the Billboard Top 200 Albums Chart where it charted for 54 weeks. The album received a Gold certification from the RIAA for shipment of 500,000 copies on January 13, 1993. The album was certified platinum in Australia.

1. "The Lounge Medley" ("(Love Is Like a) Heat Wave"/"My Guy"/"I Will Follow Him") – Deloris & The Ronelles
2. "The Murder" (Instrumental)
3. "Getting into the Habit" (Instrumental)
4. "Rescue Me" – Fontella Bass
5. "Hail Holy Queen" – Deloris & The Sisters
6. "Roll With Me Henry" – Etta James
7. "Gravy" – Dee Dee Sharp
8. "My Guy (My God)" – Deloris & The Sisters
9. "Just a Touch of Love (Everyday)" – C+C Music Factory
10. "Deloris Is Kidnapped" (Instrumental)
11. "Nuns to the Rescue" (Instrumental)
12. "Finale: I Will Follow Him ('Chariot')" – Deloris & The Sisters
13. "Shout" – Deloris & The Sisters & The Ronelles
14. "If My Sister's in Trouble" – Lady Soul
- The singing voice for the character of Mary Robert was performed by Andrea Robinson.

=== Certifications ===
Region	Certification	Certified units/sales
Australia (ARIA)	Platinum	70,000^{^}
Canada (Music Canada)	Gold	50,000^{^}
Germany (BVMI)	Gold	500,000
United States (RIAA)	Gold	500,000^{^}
^{^} Shipments figures based on certification alone.

== Reception ==
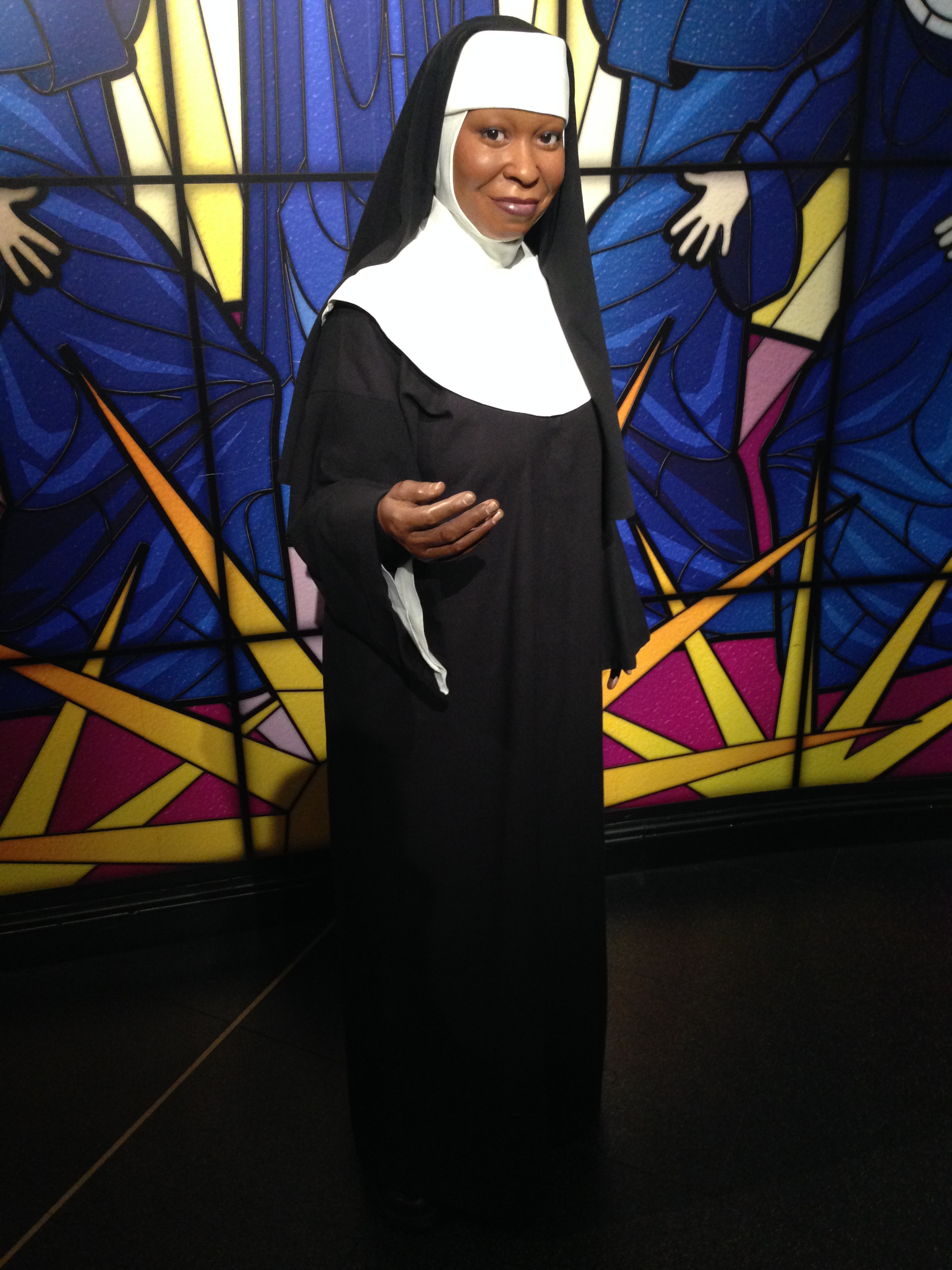
Whoopi Goldberg figure at Madame Tussauds London

=== Critical response ===
The film received a mixed to favorable reception from critics, holding a 73% rating on Rotten Tomatoes based on 30 reviews. The site's consensus states: "Looking for a sweet musical comedy about a witness to a crime hiding out from killers in a convent? There's nun better than Sister Act." Roger Ebert of the Chicago Sun-Times gave the film 2.5 stars out of a possible 4. He wrote that Goldberg and Wickes both offered humorous performances, but the film overall "plays like a missed opportunity" due to slow pacing and trouble integrating the organized crime scenes into a comedy film. Metacritic gave the film a score of 51 based on the 23 reviews, indicating "mixed or average reviews". Audiences polled by CinemaScore gave the film an average grade of "A" on an A+ to F scale.

=== Box office ===
The film was a box-office success, grossing $139.6 million in the U.S. and $92 million in other countries, effectively grossing $231.6 million worldwide, becoming the eighth-highest-grossing film worldwide of 1992. It sat at the #2 spot for four weeks, behind Lethal Weapon 3, Patriot Games, and Batman Returns in succession.

=== Accolades ===
Award	Category	Nominee(s)	Result
American Comedy Awards	Funniest Actress in a Motion Picture (Leading Role)	Whoopi Goldberg	Won
American Comedy Awards	Funniest Supporting Actress in a Motion Picture	Kathy Najimy	Won
American Comedy Awards	Funniest Supporting Actress in a Motion Picture	Maggie Smith	Nominated
American Comedy Awards	Funniest Supporting Actress in a Motion Picture	Mary Wickes	Nominated
Artios Awards	Outstanding Achievement in Feature Film Casting – Comedy	Judy Taylor, Lynda Gordon, Geoffrey Johnson, Vincent Liff and Andrew Zerman	Nominated
ASCAP Film and Television Music Awards	Top Box Office Films	Marc Shaiman	Won
Awards Circuit Community Awards	Best Actress in a Leading Role	Whoopi Goldberg	Won
Golden Globe Awards	Best Motion Picture – Musical or Comedy		Nominated
Golden Globe Awards	Best Actress in a Motion Picture – Musical or Comedy	Whoopi Goldberg	Nominated
Golden Screen Awards			Won
Kids' Choice Awards	Favorite Movie Actress	Whoopi Goldberg	Won
Movieguide Awards	Best Movie for Mature Audiences		Won
MTV Movie Awards	Best Female Performance	Whoopi Goldberg	Nominated
MTV Movie Awards	Best Comedic Performance	Whoopi Goldberg	Nominated
MTV Movie Awards	Best Breakthrough Performance	Kathy Najimy	Nominated
NAACP Image Awards	Outstanding Motion Picture		Won
NAACP Image Awards	Outstanding Actress in a Motion Picture	Whoopi Goldberg	Won
People's Choice Awards	Favorite Comedy Motion Picture		Won (Note: Tied with Home Alone 2: Lost in New York.)

The film is also recognized by American Film Institute in these lists:

- AFI's 100 Years... 100 Laughs – Nominated

=== Lawsuits ===
On June 10, 1993, actress Donna Douglas and her partner Curt Wilson in Associated Artists Entertainment, Inc. filed a $200 million lawsuit against The Walt Disney Company, Whoopi Goldberg, Bette Midler, their production companies, and Creative Artists Agency claiming the film was plagiarized from the book A Nun in the Closet, owned by the partners. Douglas and Wilson argued that, in 1985, they had developed a screenplay for the book, which had been submitted to Disney, Goldberg, and Midler three times during 1987 and 1988. The lawsuit noted over 100 similarities between the movie and the book/screenplay as evidence of plagiarism. In 1994, Douglas and Wilson declined a $1 million offer in an attempt to win the case. The judge found in favor of Disney and the other defendants. Wilson stated at the time, "They would have had to copy our stuff verbatim for us to prevail."

In November 2011, a nun named Delois Blakely filed a lawsuit against The Walt Disney Company and Sony Pictures claiming that The Harlem Street Nun, an autobiography she wrote in 1987, was the basis for the 1992 film. She alleged that a movie executive expressed an interest in the movie rights after she wrote a three-page synopsis. She sued for "breach of contract, misappropriation of likeness and unjust enrichment." Blakely dropped the original lawsuit in January 2012 to serve a more robust lawsuit in late August 2012 with the New York Supreme Court, asking for $1 billion in damages from Disney. In early February 2013, the New York Supreme Court dismissed the lawsuit with prejudice, awarding no damages to Blakely.

== Home media ==
The film was released on VHS on November 13, 1992 by Touchstone Home Video. It proved very successful in the video rental market, and ended up as the top rental of 1993 in the United States. The Region 1 DVD was released on November 6, 2001; however, the disc has no anamorphic enhancement, similar to early DVDs from Buena Vista Home Entertainment. Special Features include the film's theatrical trailer; music videos for "I Will Follow Him" by Deloris and the Sisters, and "If My Sister's in Trouble" by Lady Soul, both of which contain clips from the film; and a featurette titled "Inside Sister Act: The Making Of".

The all-region Blu-ray including both films was released on June 19, 2012, with both films presented in 1080p. The three-disc set also includes both films on DVD with the same bonus features as previous releases.

== Musical ==
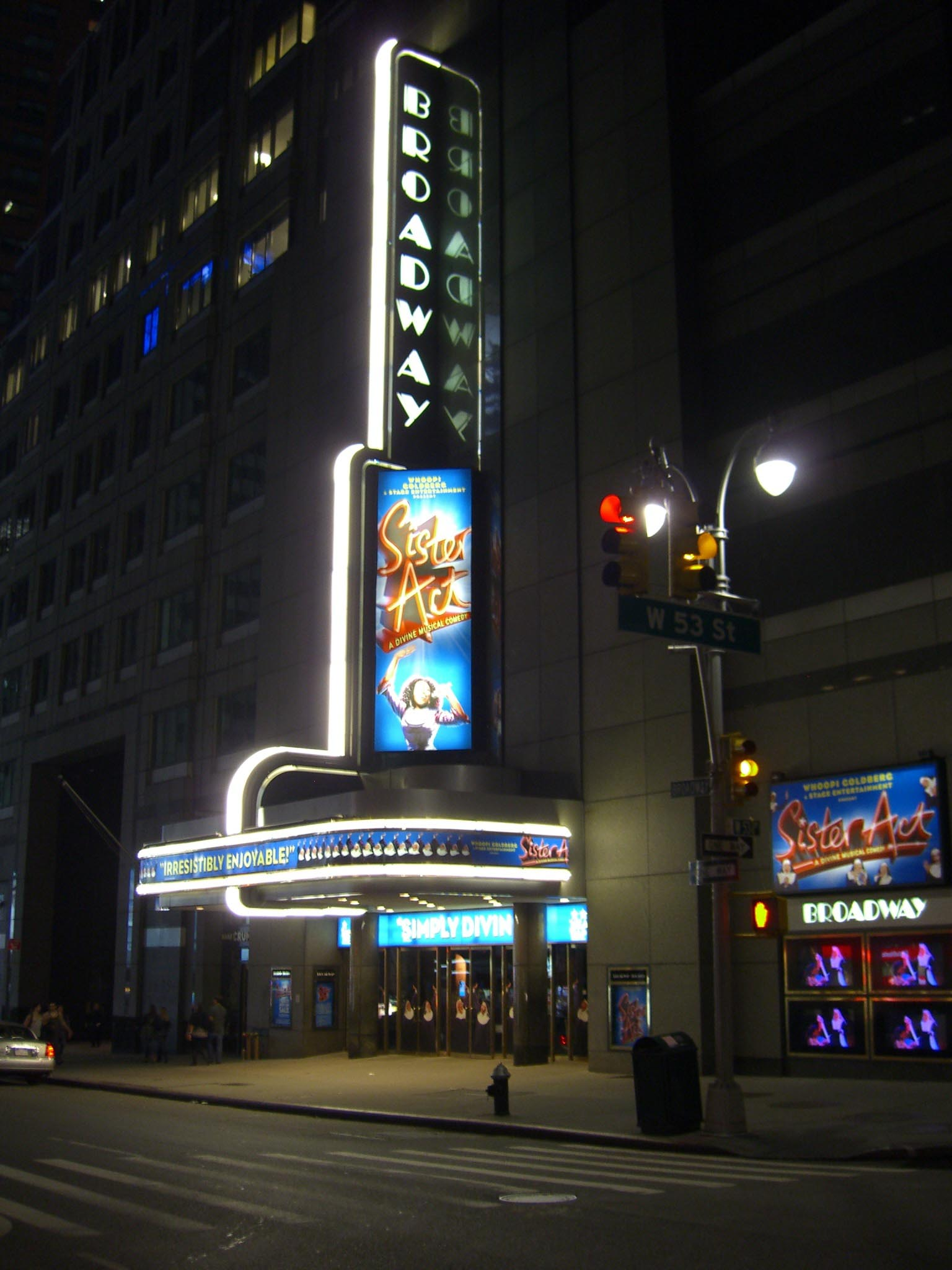
A musical based on the film played at The Broadway Theatre in Times Square, Manhattan, beginning in 2011

The musical Sister Act, directed by Peter Schneider and choreographed by Marguerite Derricks, premiered at the Pasadena Playhouse in Pasadena, California on October 24, 2006, and closed on December 23, 2006. It broke records, grossing $1,085,929 to become the highest grossing show ever at the venue. The production then moved to the Alliance Theatre in Atlanta, Georgia, where it ran from January 17 to February 25, 2007.

The musical then opened in the West End at the London Palladium on June 2, 2009, following previews from May 7. The production was directed by Peter Schneider, produced by Whoopi Goldberg together with the Dutch company Stage Entertainment, and choreographed by Anthony Van Laast, with set design by Klara Zieglerova, costume design by Lez Brotherston and lighting design by Natasha Katz. Following a year-long search, 24-year-old actress Patina Miller was cast as Deloris, alongside Sheila Hancock as the Mother Superior, Ian Lavender as Monsignor Howard, Chris Jarman as Shank, Ako Mitchell as Eddie, Katie Rowley Jones as Sister Mary Robert, Claire Greenway as Sister Mary Patrick and Julia Sutton as Sister Mary Lazarus. The musical received four Laurence Olivier Awards nominations, including Best Musical. On October 30, 2010, the show played its final performance at the London Palladium and transferred to Broadway.

The musical opened at the Broadway Theatre on April 20, 2011, with previews beginning March 24, 2011. Jerry Zaks directed the Broadway production with Douglas Carter Beane rewriting the book. Miller, who originated the role of Deloris in the West End production, reprised her role, making her Broadway debut. She was replaced by Raven-Symoné, also making her Broadway debut. The original Broadway cast featured Victoria Clark (Mother Superior), Fred Applegate (Monsignor), Sarah Bolt (Sister Mary Patrick), Chester Gregory (Eddie), Kingsley Leggs (Curtis), Marla Mindelle (Sister Mary Robert) and Audrie Neenan (Sister Mary Lazarus). The musical received five Tony Award nominations including Best Musical.

The musical closed, in August 2012, after 561 performances.
