= Touchstone Pictures =

Former American film label of Walt Disney Studios

- Formerly: Touchstone Films (1984–1986)
- Type: Label
- Industry: Motion pictures
- Founded: February 15, 1984; 42 years ago
- Founder: Ron W. Miller
- Defunct: September 2, 2016; 10 years ago
- Fate: Retired; folded into Walt Disney Pictures
- Headquarters: 500 South Buena Vista Street, Burbank, California, U.S.
- Area served: Worldwide
- Key people: Sean Bailey (2010–2016)
- Products: Motion pictures
- Parent: Walt Disney Studios

Touchstone Pictures was an American film production label of Walt Disney Studios, founded and owned by The Walt Disney Company. Feature films released under the Touchstone label were produced and financed by Walt Disney Studios, and featured more mature themes targeted at adult audiences than typical Walt Disney Pictures films. As such, Touchstone was a pseudonym label for the studio and did not exist as a distinct business operation.

Established on February 15, 1984, by then-Disney CEO Ron W. Miller as Touchstone Films, Touchstone operated as an active film production division of Disney during the mid 1980s through the early 2010s, releasing a majority of the studio's PG-13 and R-rated films. In 2009, Disney entered into a five-year, thirty-picture distribution deal with DreamWorks Pictures under which DreamWorks' productions would be released through the Touchstone banner; the label then distributed DreamWorks' films from 2011 to 2016. Following the release of The Light Between Oceans (2016), the final film of the DreamWorks deal, the Touchstone label was retired.

== History ==
=== Background and conception ===
Due to the increased public assumption that Disney films were aimed at children and families, films produced by Walt Disney Productions began to falter at the box office. This began in 1975 with the release of Escape to Witch Mountain and its 1978 sequel. In late 1979, Walt Disney Productions released The Black Hole, a science-fiction movie that was the studio's first production to receive a PG rating (the company, however, had already distributed via Buena Vista Distribution its first PG-rated film, Take Down, almost a year before the release of The Black Hole).

Over the next few years, Disney experimented with more PG-rated fare, such as the horror-mystery The Watcher in the Woods, the spy-themed comedy Condorman, and the Paramount Pictures co-produced fantasy epic Dragonslayer. With Disney's 1982 slate of PG-rated films, which included the thriller drama Night Crossing and the science-fiction film Tron, the company lost over $27 million. Tron was considered a potential Star Wars-level success by the production company.

In late 1982, Disney vice president of production Tom Wilhite announced that they would produce and release more mature films under a new brand. Wilhite elaborated to The New York Times: "We won't get into horror or exploitive sex, but using a non-Disney name will allow us wider latitude in the maturity of the subject matter and the edge we can add to the humor." He stated that one of the first films that would be released under this new brand was Trenchcoat, a comedy caper starring Margot Kidder and Robert Hays; however, the new brand had not yet been created by the time of the film's release in March 1983, so it was instead released by Walt Disney Productions, but with no production company credited in the released prints.

Disney registered a loss of $33 million in 1983, resulting primarily from such films as the adaptation of Ray Bradbury's horror-fantasy novel Something Wicked This Way Comes, the horror-comedy The Devil and Max Devlin starring Elliott Gould and Bill Cosby, and the dramas Tex and Never Cry Wolf, the latter a PG release that featured male nudity, which did well as the studio downplayed the film's association with the Disney brand. The company nearly went bankrupt when their first PG-rated animated film The Black Cauldron was released.

=== Early years as Touchstone Films ===
Touchstone Films was founded by then-Disney CEO Ron W. Miller on February 15, 1984, as a label for their PG films, with an expectation of 3-4 movies released per year under the label. Touchstone Films' first film was Splash, a huge hit that grossed $68 million at the domestic box office that year. Touchstone Films was a brand chosen from over 1,200 potential names; the runner-up name was "Silver Wind". Incoming Disney CEO Michael Eisner and film chief Jeffrey Katzenberg considered renaming the label to "Hollywood Pictures", which went on to become a separate Disney film label on February 1, 1989. The logo is often mistaken as a thunderbolt within a blue sphere. The intent is that the blue ball is actually the "stone", while the yellow marking over it is the streak left behind by the stone's use.

In 1986, Down and Out in Beverly Hills was another early success for Touchstone and was Disney's first R-rated film. It was followed in 1987 by Disney's first PG-13-rated film, Adventures in Babysitting. Disney increased the momentum with additional PG-13 and R-rated films with Ruthless People (1986), Outrageous Fortune (1987), Tin Men (1987), and other top movies. In April 1986, Touchstone films were licensed to Showtime/The Movie Channel for five years, starting in 1987.

=== Renomination and continued success ===
Touchstone Films was renamed Touchstone Pictures after the release of Ruthless People in 1986. With Touchstone films, Disney moved to the top of box office receipts, beating out all the other major film studios by 1988. On April 13, 1988, Touchstone became a unit of Walt Disney Pictures under newly appointed president Ricardo Mestres. On October 23, 1990, Disney formed Touchwood Pacific Partners I to supplant the Silver Screen Partners partnership series as their movie studios' primary funding source.

With several production companies getting out of film production or closing shop by December 2, 1988, the Walt Disney Studios announced the formation of the Hollywood Pictures division, which would only share marketing and distribution with Touchstone, to fill the void. Mestres was appointed president of Hollywood. On July 27, 1992, Touchstone agreed to an exclusive, first-look production and distribution agreement with Merchant Ivory Productions for three years.

Following the success of the Disney-branded Pirates of the Caribbean: The Curse of the Black Pearl in 2003, Disney weighed distribution of more films towards Disney-branded and part-time away from Touchstone, though not entirely disbanding them as it continued to use the Touchstone label for R and most PG-13-rated fare. In 2006, Disney limited Touchstone's output to two or three films in favor of Walt Disney Pictures titles due to an increase in film industry costs. Disney indicated scaling back on using multiple brands in 2007 with the renaming of Touchstone Television to ABC Television Studio in February and the outright elimination of the Buena Vista brand in April. On January 14, 2010, Sean Bailey was appointed president of live-action production at Walt Disney Studios, overseeing all films produced by Walt Disney Pictures and Touchstone Pictures.

=== DreamWorks deal and dormancy ===
In 2009, Disney entered into a distribution deal with DreamWorks Studios and repurposed Touchstone as a distribution label for DreamWorks films. Disney provided $100 million in financing to DreamWorks productions and an additional $75 million credit line if DreamWorks could not get additional equity funding. In January 2012, Disney was reportedly in the early stages of considering Touchstone's fate, including a possible sale.

Following Disney's decision not to renew their long-standing deal with Jerry Bruckheimer Films in 2013, producer Jerry Bruckheimer revealed that he insisted on revitalizing the Touchstone label for production. Disney was uninterested, with studio chairman Alan Horn admitting that Touchstone's output had been reduced to only distributing DreamWorks' films as those films were in the label's interest. In addition to DreamWorks' films, Touchstone also released non-Disney-branded animated films such as Gnomeo & Juliet, The Wind Rises, and Strange Magic.

By the end of the DreamWorks deal in August 2016, Disney had distributed 14 of DreamWorks' original 30-picture agreement, with thirteen through Touchstone. The deal ended with The Light Between Oceans being the final theatrical film released by Disney under the Touchstone banner. Universal Pictures then replaced Disney as DreamWorks' distributor. Disney retained the film rights to these DreamWorks films in perpetuity as compensation for the studio's outstanding loan.

Following the release of The Light Between Oceans, the label became defunct. Since then, several other Disney divisions have produced or are developing television series and films based on previous Touchstone properties—such as Turner & Hooch, High Fidelity, Three Men and a Baby, Sister Act, and Real Steel—for Disney+ and Hulu.

== Film library ==
Some well-known Touchstone Pictures releases include Splash, The Color of Money, Down and Out in Beverly Hills, Good Morning, Vietnam, Who Framed Roger Rabbit, Beaches, Turner & Hooch, Dead Poets Society, Dick Tracy, Pretty Woman, Sister Act, Ed Wood, Up Close & Personal, The Waterboy, Rushmore, The Insider, Unbreakable, The Royal Tenenbaums, Sweet Home Alabama, The Life Aquatic with Steve Zissou, The Hitchhiker's Guide to the Galaxy, The Prestige, The Help, War Horse, Lincoln, and Bridge of Spies. Its highest-grossing film release is Armageddon, grossing $553.7 million worldwide. Although animated films produced by Walt Disney Studios are primarily released by Walt Disney Pictures, Touchstone's animated releases include the original theatrical release of The Nightmare Before Christmas, Gnomeo & Juliet, The Wind Rises, and Strange Magic. Six Touchstone films have received nominations for the Academy Award for Best Picture: Dead Poets Society, The Insider, The Help, War Horse, Lincoln, and Bridge of Spies. Some of their films were co-productions with Paramount Pictures such as Alive, Face/Off, Runaway Bride, A Civil Action, Snake Eyes, and Bringing Out the Dead.

Through Touchstone, Disney's first R-rated film, Down and Out in Beverly Hills, was released on January 31, 1986, and was a box office success. Ruthless People followed on June 27, 1986, and was also very successful. Both of these pictures starred Bette Midler, who had signed a six-picture deal with Disney and became a major film star again with these hits as well as Beaches and Outrageous Fortune.

One of the most notable producers of Touchstone films was Jerry Bruckheimer, who had a production deal with Disney from 1993 to 2014. Touchstone films produced by Bruckheimer include The Ref, Con Air, Armageddon, Enemy of the State, Gone in 60 Seconds, Coyote Ugly, and Pearl Harbor. Bruckheimer also produced several other films released under the Disney and Hollywood Pictures labels.

Releases from Touchstone were distributed theatrically by Walt Disney Studios Motion Pictures and through home media platforms by Buena Vista Home Entertainment (branded as "Touchstone Home Entertainment").

=== Highest-grossing films ===
Highest-grossing Touchstone films in North America
Rank	Title	Year	Box office gross
1	Signs	2002	$227,966,634
2	Armageddon	1998	$201,578,182
3	Pearl Harbor	2001	$198,542,554
4	Lincoln	2012	$182,207,973
5	Pretty Woman	1990	$178,406,268
6	The Help	2011	$169,708,112
7	Wild Hogs	2007	$168,273,550
8	Three Men and a Baby	1987	$167,780,960
9	The Proposal	2009	$163,958,031
10	The Waterboy	1998	$161,491,646
11	Who Framed Roger Rabbit	1988	$154,112,492
12	Sister Act	1992	$139,605,150
13	Ransom	1996	$136,492,681
14	Bringing Down the House	2003	$132,716,677
15	Sweet Home Alabama	2002	$127,223,418
16	Good Morning, Vietnam	1987	$123,922,370
17	The Village	2004	$114,197,520
18	Enemy of the State	1998	$111,549,836
19	Phenomenon	1996	$104,636,382
20	Dick Tracy	1990	$103,738,726
21	Gone in 60 Seconds	2000	$101,648,571
22	Con Air	1997	$101,117,573
23	Gnomeo & Juliet	2011	$99,967,670
24	Dead Poets Society	1989	$95,860,116
25	Unbreakable	2000	$95,011,339

Highest-grossing Touchstone films worldwide
Rank	Title	Year	Box office gross
1	Armageddon	1998	$553,709,788
2	Pretty Woman	1990	$463,406,268
3	Pearl Harbor	2001	$449,220,945
4	Signs	2002	$408,247,917
5	Who Framed Roger Rabbit	1988	$351,500,000
6	The Proposal	2009	$317,375,031
7	Ransom	1996	$309,492,681
8	Real Steel	2011	$299,268,508
9	Lincoln	2012	$275,293,450
10	The Village	2004	$256,697,520
11	Wild Hogs	2007	$253,625,427
12	Enemy of the State	1998	$250,649,836
13	Unbreakable	2000	$248,118,121
14	Gone in 60 Seconds	2000	$237,202,299
15	Dead Poets Society	1989	$235,860,116
16	Sister Act	1992	$231,605,150
17	Con Air	1997	$224,012,234
18	Flightplan	2005	$223,387,299
19	The Help	2011	$216,639,112
20	King Arthur	2004	$203,567,857
21	Need for Speed	2014	$203,277,636
22	Gnomeo & Juliet	2011	$193,967,670
23	The Waterboy	1998	$185,991,646
24	Sweet Home Alabama	2002	$180,622,424
25	War Horse	2011	$177,584,879

== Related units ==
=== Touchstone Television ===
Touchstone Television served as Touchstone Pictures' counterpart label for television programming, producing television series including The Golden Girls, Blossom, Home Improvement, Ellen, My Wife and Kids, Scrubs, Monk, Lost, Desperate Housewives, Grey's Anatomy, and Criminal Minds. In 2007, the company was renamed ABC Studios as part of a move by Disney to re-align its studios around core brands such as ABC.

On August 10, 2020, Disney announced that it would revive the Touchstone Television brand as a renaming of Fox 21 Television Studios as part of its phase-out of the "Fox" brand from the studios it acquired from 21st Century Fox. At the same time, the existing ABC Studios merged with the previous iteration of ABC Signature Studios to form ABC Signature.

However, on December 1, 2020, Disney announced the revived Touchstone Television label would be folded into 20th Television. Subsequently, on October 1, 2024, Disney announced that ABC Signature would also be folded into 20th Television.

=== Touchstone Records ===
Touchstone Records was an imprint issued by Buena Vista Records.

=== Touchstone Interactive ===
Touchstone Interactive
- Industry: Video games
- Founded: 2007; 19 years ago
- Founder: Richard Berger
- Defunct: 2008; 18 years ago
- Parent: Disney Interactive Studios

By the end of 2007, Disney's video game subsidiary Buena Vista Games had begun to produce material under its own short-lived Touchstone imprint. As is the case with its motion picture and television counterparts, Touchstone Interactive merely acted as a brand label of Disney Interactive and not its own entity. The only titles it released were a European release of Anno 1701: Dawn of Discovery in 2007, and the Turok video game in 2008.

=== Touchmark Comics ===
In the early 1990s, after having pulled their comic licenses from Gladstone Publishing and begun to create comics based on Disney properties themselves through the Disney Comics label, the company additionally considered an expansion into the burgeoning adult comics market (the expansion also included Hollywood Comics, modeled after Hollywood Pictures, and Vista Comics, offering stories based on Disney's superhero and adventure films). Former DC Comics editor Art Young led the nascent effort, which was aided by his contacts within the British and American comic markets. The new label was dubbed Touchmark Comics, echoing the Touchstone brand used for films and television. Proposed titles included Enigma by Peter Milligan and Sebastian O by Grant Morrison. The brand got as far as a promotional booklet given out at the 1991 San Diego Comic-Con.

Before the idea could progress further, however, the so-called "Disney Implosion" (the result of poor sales and aggressive overexpansion) forced the company to cut back on its comic book ambitions, and Touchmark was scrapped. Young subsequently returned to DC and helped launch the Vertigo imprint in 1993, using many of the intended projects from Touchmark.
