= Sister Act (musical) =

2006 musical by Alan Menken and Glenn Slater

- A Divine Musical Comedy
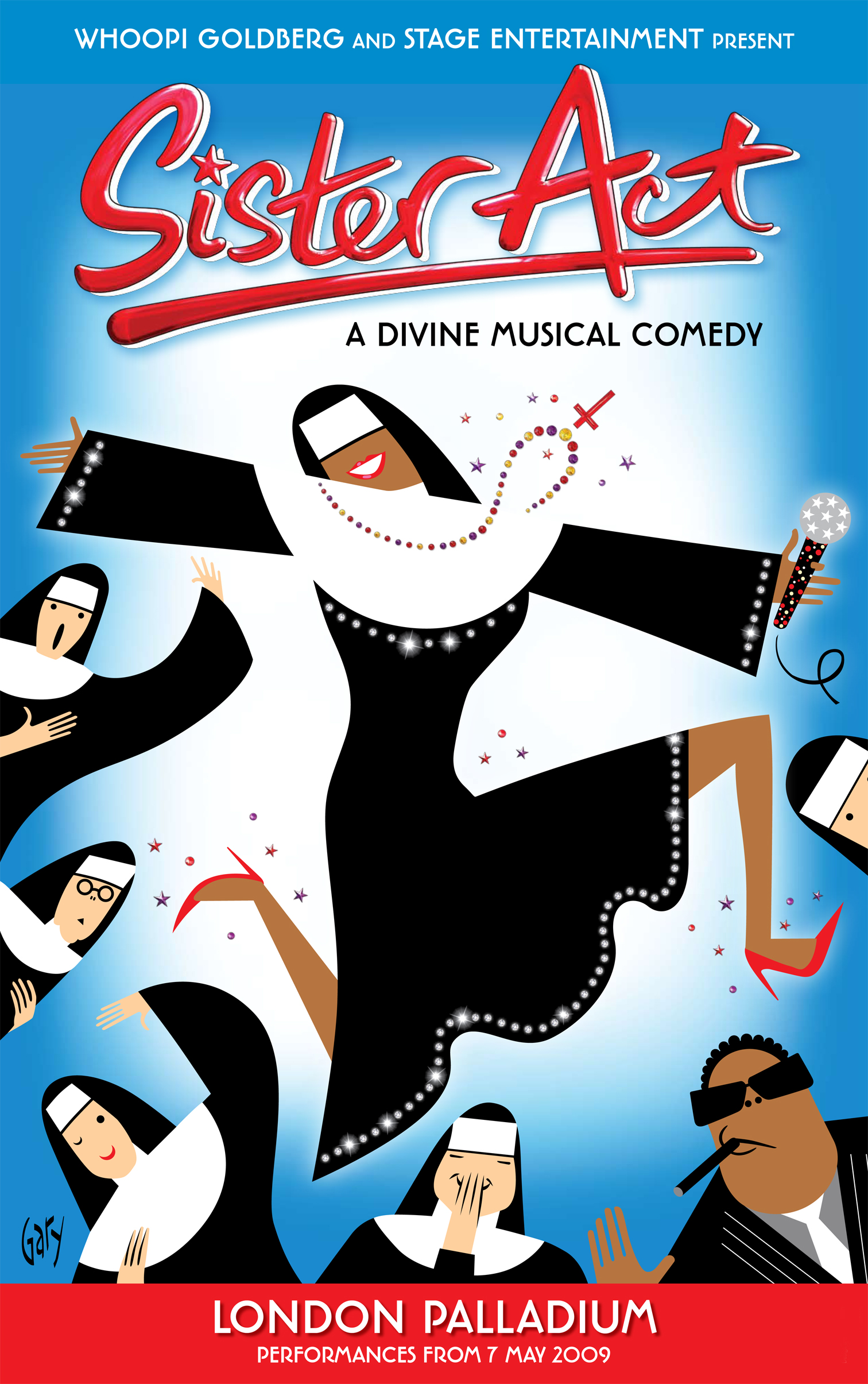
- Poster for the West End production
- Music: Alan Menken
- Lyrics: Glenn Slater
- Book: Cheri Steinkellner; Bill Steinkellner
- Basis: Sister Act by Joseph Howard
- Premiere: October 24, 2006: Pasadena Playhouse
- Productions: 2006 Pasadena; 2007 Atlanta; 2009 West End; 2011 Broadway; 2011 UK tour 2012 North American tour 2014 US tour 2016 UK tour 2022 UK tour 2024 West End revival

Sister Act is a musical based on the 1992 film of the same name with music by Alan Menken, lyrics by Glenn Slater, book by Bill and Cheri Steinkellner, and additional material by Douglas Carter Beane. After having a regional premiere in 2006, in Pasadena, California, the original West End production opened on June 2, 2009, at the London Palladium, starring Patina Miller. Subsequent productions have been seen on Broadway and in many countries around the world. The Broadway musical is produced by Whoopi Goldberg and Stage Entertainment in association with The Shubert Organization and Disney Theatrical Productions.

== Synopsis ==
=== West End ===
Act 1

In Philadelphia, the Mother Superior declares that the convent is in need (Prologue) before Deloris Van Cartier, crowned 'Lady Fabulous' of 1978, is seen performing in the night club run by her gangster boyfriend Curtis Shank ("Take Me to Heaven"). Deloris is overjoyed as she believes her boyfriend is going to introduce her to a record producer on that day (her birthday), although she soon learns that this is not to be. Hurt and frustrated, Deloris goes to her backup singers KT and LaRosa, about her dreams of stardom and fame ("Fabulous, Baby!"). She decides to break up with Shank and head out of Philadelphia to go fulfill her dreams on her own. However she gets to Shank just in time to see him and his crew made up of nephew TJ, Bones, and Dinero, shoot someone who they believe has "squealed" about them to the cops. Horrified, Deloris runs away and Shank orders his men to get her and bring her back. Deloris runs to a police station and tells the desk chief, Eddie, about what happened. The two recognize each other as old friends from school with Deloris calling him "Sweaty Eddie". Eddie decides that Deloris needs to go into the witness protection program and sends her to the place he believes Shank will never find her - a convent called The Holy Order of the Little Sisters of Our Mother of Perpetual Faith.

Deloris is disappointed by this idea as she learns from the Mother Superior that contact with the outside world is limited, and that she cannot smoke, drink, or wear any of her less than appropriate clothing ("Here Within These Walls"). Deloris joins the other nuns for dinner and after several comedic interactions with the overly perky Sister Mary Patrick, Deloris discovers how the other nuns got their "calling" from the Lord ("How I Got the Calling"). They then ask Deloris to share her story with them and she lies.

Meanwhile, back in his nightclub, Shank is frustrated that he cannot find Deloris anywhere. He tells his goons how he will not stop until he finds and kills Deloris ("When I Find My Baby"). Back at the convent Deloris is bored by the simple life of the nuns and decides to hit the town. She goes across the street to a slinky bar, and is followed by Sister Mary Lazarus, Sister Mary Patrick, and Sister Mary Robert. When the three nuns arrive they are shocked to find Sister Mary Clarence (Deloris' undercover name) drinking and dancing, however they assume that she is attempting to save the lost souls in the bar. Deloris goes along with this idea and gets the whole bar dancing ("Do the Sacred Mass"). However, the joyful mood is quickly destroyed when Deloris recognises Shank's boys entering the bar. She tries to hide herself as they ask people in the bar if they've seen Deloris. Suddenly there is a fight in the bar which has to be broken up by Eddie and the Mother Superior, who orders the nuns to go back to the convent. She then confronts Deloris telling her that she must conform to the life of the nuns. Eddie agrees, telling Deloris that Shank has upped the price on her head, so she needs to be careful. Deloris storms back to the convent after being informed that she has to wake up at 5 a.m. and join the choir. Eddie, now alone with only the drunks and homeless on the street, sings of his desire to be cool, to let go, and impress Deloris ("I Could Be That Guy").

The following morning Deloris attends the choir practice and loudly admits that the choir sounds terrible. This prompts the Mother superior to let Deloris lead the choir. Deloris does so and teaches the nuns how to sing on key and on time. She also manages to break the quiet and timid Sister Mary Robert out of her shell ("Raise Your Voice"). That Sunday, the choir perform an up-tempo hymn ("Take Me to Heaven (Reprise)") which to the struggling church's surprise brings in more people and more donations. The Mother Superior, however, is horrified how the simple traditional choir she knew has changed and become modern. The news of the choir soon spreads with photographers and news reporters coming in to get the story behind the latest sensation - this wonderful nontraditional choir.

Act 2

Over the coming weeks, the choir has become incredibly successful and the money from donations has paid for the church to be remodelled and fixed ("Sunday Morning Fever"). However, the newfound fame comes at a price. Shank and his goons spot Deloris with the choir in the newspaper. Shank orders his boys to get into the convent and bring Deloris to him. TJ, Bones, and Dinero discuss how they will do this ("Lady in the Long Black Dress"). Meanwhile, back at the church, Monsignor Howard has some terrific news: the choir has been asked to perform a special concert in front of the Pope. The choir are overjoyed but nervous and that night they ask Deloris to pray for their success ("Bless Our Show"). Deloris is also looking forward to the occasion, although the Mother Superior calls her over and tells her that Shank's men have just come looking for her and she must leave quickly. The other nuns overhear and Deloris is forced to tell them the truth about who she really is and that she cannot perform with them. Deloris quickly runs off to get her things followed by Sister Mary Robert while the other nuns disappointedly go back to their rooms. Alone in Deloris' room, the Mother Superior expresses joy that life can go back to being as it was. However it is evident that she, along with the other nuns, have developed a love for Sister Mary Clarence and her modern if somewhat unorthodox ways ("Here Within These Walls (Reprise)").

As Deloris prepares to leave Sister Mary Robert begs to come with her, claiming that she has been inspired to become a stronger person and go after the things she wants ("The Life I Never Led"). Deloris tells her that she doesn't need her to do that, and that she can do it all herself if she really wants to. Deloris runs from the convent and stays at Eddie's house for the night. While there she initially is overjoyed that the following day she will testify against Shank and his boys and then go back to pursuing the career she's dreamed of ("Fabulous, Baby! (Reprise)"). Guilty for abandoning her sisters when they needed her, she reflects on her life and realises that the choices she is making will leave her with nothing but fame and money, and when the lights go out she will be alone. She decides to return to the convent and sing with her sisters ("Sister Act").

Meanwhile, Shank thinks up a new way to get into the convent ("When I Find My Baby (Reprise)"). Dressed as nuns, Shank and his boys sneak into the convent; they find and chase Deloris. Sister Mary Patrick, who has seen what has happened, informs the other nuns who insist they must go and help Deloris. The Mother Superior, however, is adamant that they stay and call the police, prompting an outburst from Sister Mary Robert who tells her that she won't be quiet and take orders blindly anymore; that she is going to help Deloris ("The Life I Never Led (Reprise)"). The other nuns agree and all of them go running through the convent looking for Deloris. It all comes down to a final confrontation in which Shank, armed and dangerous, tells Deloris to get on her knees and beg for her life. However, all the sisters and nuns stand in front of her telling Shank that they will have to go through them first ("Sister Act (Reprise)"). Shank is about to start firing at the nuns when Eddie comes in and fights Shank off. He arrests Shank and his boys and then asks Deloris out on a date which she accepts. The Mother Superior and Deloris come to a truce and accept that perhaps they are not so different after all. The show ends with all the nuns and eventually the entire cast performing for the Pope ("Spread the Love Around").

=== Broadway ===
Act 1

On Christmas Eve, Deloris Van Cartier is performing for her gangster boyfriend Curtis Jackson in the night club he owns ("Take Me to Heaven"). Deloris is overjoyed as she believes her boyfriend is going to introduce her to a record producer on that day, although she soon learns that this is not to be. Jackson tells her he cannot join her for Christmas Day, but gives her a coat, which she discovers belonged to his wife. Hurt and frustrated, Deloris sings to her backup singers, Michelle and Tina, about her dreams of stardom and fame ("Fabulous, Baby!"). She decides to break up with Jackson to fulfill her dreams on her own, but gets to him just in time to see him and his crew shoot Ernie, who they believe has "squealed" about them to the cops.

Horrified, Deloris runs to a police station and tells the desk chief, Eddie, about what happened. Eddie decides that Deloris needs to go into the witness protection program and sends her to the place he believes Jackson will never find her - a convent. When she arrives, Deloris is upset to learn from the Mother Superior that contact with the outside world is limited, and that she cannot smoke, drink, or wear any of her own clothing ("Here Within These Walls"). Deloris, introduced as "Sister Mary Clarence," joins the other nuns for dinner and discovers just how much is limited when she is a nun ("It’s Good to Be A Nun"). Deloris asks them about what they are missing, and the Mother superior makes Deloris go on a fast.

Back in his nightclub, Jackson is frustrated that he cannot find Deloris anywhere. He tells his "crew," Joey, TJ, and Pablo, how he will not stop until he finds and kills Deloris ("When I Find My Baby"). Deloris, hungry from the fast, leaves the convent and goes to a bar across the street, where Joey, TJ, and Pablo are eating. She is followed by two nuns, Sister Mary Patrick and Sister Mary Robert, who realize what life is like outside the convent. Joey almost recognizes Deloris when he gives her money for the jukebox, but dismisses it. When a drag queen enters in a similar outfit to Deloris' opening costume, Joey, TJ, and Pablo try to stop her and get into a fight, giving Deloris, Sister Mary Patrick, and Sister Mary Robert a chance to escape.

At the convent, Eddie confronts Deloris, telling her that she needs to be more careful, and the Mother Superior informs her that she join the choir the following day. Deloris storms off, and Eddie, now alone with only the drunks and homeless on the street, sings of his desire to be cool, to let go, and impress Deloris ("I Could Be That Guy").

The following morning Deloris attends the choir practice and, upon realizing how bad they are, offers to help them. She replaces Sister Mary Lazarus, an older and crankier nun, as their leader, and teaches the nuns how to sing in key and in time ("Raise Your Voice"). That Sunday, the choir perform an up-tempo hymn ("Take Me to Heaven (Reprise)") which brings in more people and more donations but leaves the Mother Superior disgusted.

Act 2

The Mother Superior wants to get rid of Deloris, but Monsignor O’Hara tells her that the men who were planning to buy the church love the choir, and have given their money to improve and keep the church. Over the coming weeks, the choir has become incredibly successful and the money from donations has paid for the church to be remodeled and fixed ("Sunday Morning Fever"). Monsignor O’Hara has some terrific news: the choir has been asked to perform a special concert in front of the Pope. However, Jackson and his goons spot Deloris with the choir on the television. Jackson orders his boys to get into the convent and bring Deloris to him. TJ, Joey, and Pablo discuss how they will do this ("Lady in the Long Black Dress").

That night, the Mother Superior asks God why He has given her the challenge that is Deloris ("Haven’t Got A Prayer"), and shortly after, receives a call from Eddie. Meanwhile, Deloris is approached by the Nuns before they go to sleep, asking her to lead them praying for their show for the Pope, which is the following day ("Bless Our Show"). The Mother superior arrives and tells Deloris that the court date for Jackson has moved up to the next day and she must leave immediately. The other nuns overhear and Deloris is forced to tell them the truth about who she really is and that she cannot perform with them.

As Deloris prepares to leave, Sister Mary Robert begs to come with her, claiming that she has been inspired to become a stronger person and go after the things she wants ("The Life I Never Led"). Deloris, staying at Eddie's house for the night, is initially overjoyed that she will be able to go back to pursuing the career she's dreamed of after testifying against Jackson ("Fabulous, Baby! (Reprise)"). However, she realizes that her sisters are more important than any fame or money, and decides to return to the convent to sing with them ("Sister Act").

Meanwhile, Jackson thinks up a new way to get into the convent, giving Joey, TJ, and Pablo nun costumes ("When I Find My Baby (Reprise)"). Deloris interrupts a choir rehearsal and is told by the Mother Superior that she is endangering the lives of the nuns and that she must leave. Sister Mary Robert stands with Deloris ("The Life I Never Led (Reprise)"), but is interrupted by Curtis and his men breaking into the church. The nuns scatter and are able to take down Joey, TJ, and Pablo, but Jackson enters and traps Sister Mary Robert at gunpoint.

Deloris begs Jackson to kill her instead, but the Mother Superior and all the other nuns stand between them ("Sister Act (Reprise)"). Jackson is about to start firing at the nuns when Eddie enters and arrests Jackson and his boys. He and Deloris share a kiss. The Mother Superior and Deloris come to a truce and accept that perhaps they are not so different after all, and the entire company performs for the Pope ("Spread the Love Around").

== Productions ==
=== Original productions in Pasadena and Atlanta ===
The musical premiered at the Pasadena Playhouse in Pasadena, California on October 24, 2006, and closed on December 23, 2006. It broke records, grossing $1,085,929 to become the highest grossing show ever at the venue. Patina Miller, who would later go on to play Deloris when the show opened in London, was in the ensemble and understudied the role of Deloris, which was originated in the musical by Dawnn Lewis.

The musical was directed by Peter Schneider, developed by Schneider and Michael Reno, choreographed by Marguerite Derricks, with set design by David Potts, costumes by Garry Lennon, lighting by Donald Holder, and sound by Carl Casella and Dominick Sack.

Charles McNulty of the Los Angeles Times wrote that the musical has "Broadway blockbuster written all over it," and Laurence Vittes described it as "hugely entertaining... likely to become a classic" in The Hollywood Reporter. Jonas Schwartz of Theatremania.com was less enthusiastic, saying it "suffers from a bit of an identity crisis."

The production then moved to the Alliance Theatre in Atlanta, Georgia, where it ran from January 17 to February 25, 2007. The cast included Dawnn Lewis as Deloris, Elizabeth Ward Land as the Mother Superior, Harrison White as Curtis, and Beth Malone as Sister Mary Robert.

Curt Holman, writing for the Atlanta-based website CreativeLoafing.com, described it as "a whiplash-inducing experience of genuinely clever and exuberant flourishes alternating with cringe-inducing embarrassments.... The weakest parts of Sister Act tend to be the most faithful moments to the film, which makes you wonder what Menken, Slater and the production's delightful design team could have done with original material."

=== Original London production ===
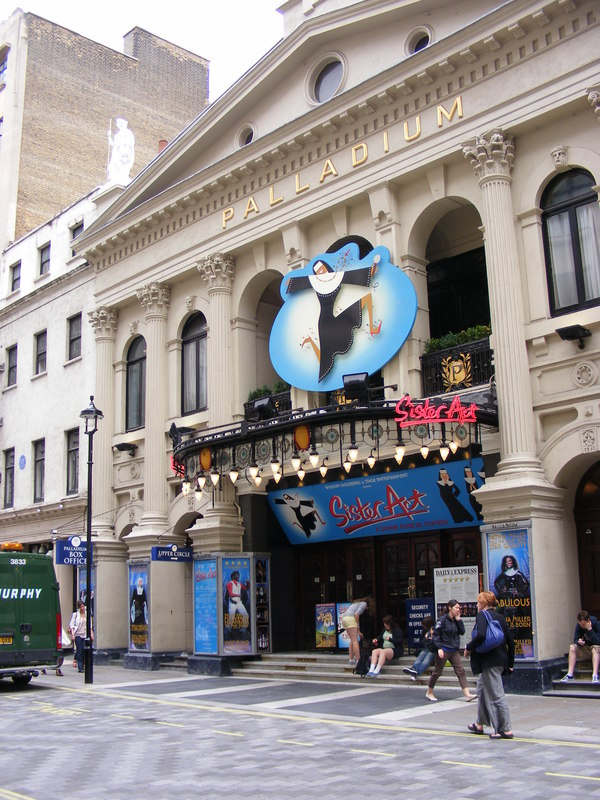
Sister Act at the London Palladium

Sister Act opened in the West End at the London Palladium on June 2, 2009, following previews from May 7. The production was directed by Peter Schneider and choreographed by Anthony Van Laast, with set design by Klara Zieglerova, costumes by Lez Brotherston and lighting by Natasha Katz. Following a year-long search, Patina Miller, who understudied the role of Deloris at Pasadena Playhouse was cast as the principal star, alongside Sheila Hancock as the Mother Superior, Ian Lavender as Monsignor Howard, Chris Jarman as Shank, Ako Mitchell as Eddie, Katie Rowley Jones as Sister Mary Robert, Claire Greenway as Sister Mary Patrick and Julia Sutton (later replaced by Jacqueline Clarke) as Sister Mary Lazarus. It was announced on April 29, 2010, that pop singer Simon Webbe of Blue fame would join the cast as Shank on May 31, 2010, and that the production would close on January 1, 2011. It was then announced the show would close on October 30, 2010, to make way for Andrew Lloyd Webber's new musical production of The Wizard of Oz. Chris Jarman took a planned break from the show from May, during which time Webbe played the role of Shank, and Sheila Hancock left on July 31 due to other contractual commitments. All cast members (with the exception of Simon Webbe, who left on August 28) stayed in the show until it closed. Whoopi Goldberg joined the cast as the Mother Superior for a limited engagement that was supposed to last from August 10–31, 2010, but she left the cast on August 27 due to her mother suffering a stroke. Goldberg was then succeeded by Sally Dexter. However, Goldberg returned to the cast for five performances on October 22, 23, and 25. The show closed as announced on October 30, 2010.

=== Original Broadway production ===
A newly revised adaptation of the show opened on Broadway at the Broadway Theatre on April 20, 2011, after previews beginning March 24, 2011. Jerry Zaks was the new director (Zaks had previously worked with composer Alan Menken on the 2003 Broadway production of Little Shop of Horrors) with Douglas Carter Beane rewriting the book. Patina Miller, who originated the role of Deloris in the West End production, reprised the role, making her Broadway debut. The original cast featured Victoria Clark (the Mother Superior), Fred Applegate (Monsignor), Sarah Bolt (Sister Mary Patrick), Chester Gregory (Eddie), Kingsley Leggs (Curtis), Marla Mindelle (Sister Mary Robert) and Audrie Neenan (Sister Mary Lazarus). On October 12, 2011, Clark left the production for unknown reasons. Her understudy, Jennifer Allen played the role after her departure. Carolee Carmello took over the role of the Mother Superior on November 19, 2011. Raven-Symoné replaced Miller as Deloris on March 27, 2012. The show received multiple Tony Award nominations for the 2011 season, including for Best Musical, Best Actress in a Musical (Miller) and Best Featured Actress in a Musical (Clark). The production closed on August 26, 2012, after 28 previews and 561 performances.

=== Subsequent productions ===
In 2010 Stage Entertainment produced the first international adaptation in Germany.

The first UK touring production opened on October 4, 2011, at the Manchester Opera House, with Cynthia Erivo as Deloris Van Cartier, Denise Black as the Mother Superior, Julie Atherton as Sister Mary Robert, and Michael Starke as Monsignor O'Hara. The tour played its final performance on October 20, 2012.

A new non-replica UK tour officially opened on August 11, 2016, running to September 3, 2017. Directed and choreographed by Craig Revel Horwood, the tour starred Alexandra Burke as Deloris Van Cartier, Jon Robyns as Eddie and Rosemary Ashe as Sister Mary Lazarus.

The first national North American tour debuted on October 2, 2012, at the Ed Mirvish Theatre in Toronto, Canada and closed on June 29, 2014, at the Majestic Theatre in San Antonio, Texas. The cast included Ta'Rea Campbell as Deloris Van Cartier and Hollis Resnik as the Mother Superior (later replaced by Lynne Wintersteller). A second national tour (non-equity) ran from 2014 to 2015.

On May 9, 2017, an international tour started at the Marina Bay Sands in Singapore and visited Philippines, China, Japan, and South Korea, closing January 21, 2018 at the Blue Square Interpark Hall in Seoul. The cast was led by Dené Hill as Deloris Van Cartier.

On October 23, 2019, it was announced that the musical would run from July 29, 2020, at the Hammersmith Apollo in London for 39 performances with Jennifer Saunders in the role of the Mother Superior and Whoopi Goldberg as Deloris Van Cartier. The production was delayed twice due to the COVID-19 pandemic and finally played from July 19 to August 28, 2022, with Goldberg no longer involved. Full casting was announced on March 18, 2022 where it was confirmed that Beverley Knight would play the role of Van Cartier.

A third UK and Ireland tour was expected to start on April 21, 2020, at the Leicester Curve Theatre but was also delayed and started on June 27, 2022 at the Manchester Palace Theatre, playing its final performance on October 5, 2024 at the Liverpool Empire Theatre.

A Danish production opened on September 21, 2023, at Det Ny Teater in Copenhagen, with Julie Steincke as Deloris Van Cartier.

An Asian non-replica tour produced by EMK Productions launched in November 2023, starring Nicole Vanessa Ortiz as Deloris Van Cartier.

A West End revival played a limited season from March 15 to August 31, 2024 at the Dominion Theatre, with Beverley Knight (March 15-June 8) and Alexandra Burke (June 10-August 31) sharing the role of Deloris Van Cartier, and Ruth Jones making her West End debut as the Mother Superior (March 15-August 3).

== Major casts ==
| Character | Pasadena | Atlanta | West End | Broadway | First UK Tour | First US Tour | Second US Tour | Second UK Tour | Manchester | London | Third UK Tour | West End |
| Character | 2006 | 2007 | 2009 | 2011 | | 2012 | 2014 | 2016 | 2022 | | | 2024 |
|---|---|---|---|---|---|---|---|---|---|---|---|---|
| Deloris Van Cartier | Dawnn Lewis | Dawnn Lewis | Patina Miller | Patina Miller | Cynthia Erivo | Ta'Rea Campbell | Kerissa Arrington | Alexandra Burke | Sandra Marvin | Beverley Knight | Sandra Marvin | Beverley Knight |
| Mother Superior | Elizabeth Ward Land | Elizabeth Ward Land | Sheila Hancock | Victoria Clark | Denise Black | Hollis Resnik | Maggie Clennon Reberg | Karen Mann | Jennifer Saunders | Jennifer Saunders | Lesley Joseph | Ruth Jones |
| Curtis Jackson/Shank | Harrison White | Harrison White | Chris Jarman | Kingsley Leggs | Cavin Cornwall | Kingsley Leggs | Kolby Kindle | Aaron Lee Lambert | Jeremy Secomb | Jeremy Secomb | Jeremy Secomb | Lemar |
| Lt. Eddie Souther | David Jennings | David Jennings | Ako Mitchell | Chester Gregory | Edward Baruwa | E. Clayton Cornelious | Lamont O'Neal | Jon Robyns | Clive Rowe | Clive Rowe | Clive Rowe | Clive Rowe |
| Sister Mary Robert | Beth Malone | Beth Malone | Katie Rowley Jones | Marla Mindelle | Julie Atherton | Lael Van Keuren | Emily Kay Shrader | Sarah Goggin | Lizzie Bea | Lizzie Bea | Lizzie Bea | Lizzie Bea |
| Sister Mary Patrick | Amy K. Murray | Amy K. Murray | Claire Greenway | Sarah Bolt | Laurie Scarth | Florrie Bagel | Sarah Michelle Cuc | Susannah Van Den Berg | Keala Settle | Keala Settle | Catherine Millson | Alison Jiear |
| Sister Mary Lazarus | Audrie Neenan | Audrie Neenan | Julia Sutton | Audrie J. Neenan | Jacqueline Clarke | Diane J. Findlay | Nancy Evans | Rosemary Ashe | Lesley Joseph | Lesley Joseph | Anne Smith | Lesley Joseph |
| Monsignor O'Hara/Howard | Henry Polic II | Henry Polic II | Ian Lavender | Fred Applegate | Michael Starke | Richard Pruitt | Gordon Gray | Tim Maxwell-Clarke | Graham Mcduff | Graham Mcduff | Graham Mcduff | Carl Mullaney |
| Joey/Bones | Danny Stiles | Danny Stiles | Nicolas Colicos | John Treacy Egan | Daniel Stockton | Todd A. Horman | F. Tyler Burnet | Samuel Morgan-Grahame | Tom Hopcroft | Tom Hopcroft | Tom Hopcroft | Tom Hopcroft |
| TJ | Melvin Abston | Melvin Abston | Thomas Goodridge | Demond Green | Tyrone Huntley | Charles Thomas | Lawrence Dandridge | Sandy Grigelis | Bradley Judge | Bradley Judge | Bradley Judge | Bradley Judge |
| Pablo/Dinero | Dan Domenech | Dan Domenech | Ivan De Freitas | Caesar Samayoa | Gavin Alex | Ernie Pruneda | Nicholas Alexander Rodríguez | Ricky Rojas | Damian Buhagiar | Damian Buhagiar | Damian Buhagiar | Damian Buhagiar |

=== Notable replacements ===
==== West End ====
- Mother Superior: Whoopi Goldberg, Sally Dexter
- Curtis Shank: Simon Webbe

==== Broadway ====
- Deloris van Cartier: Raven-Symoné
- Mother Superior: Carolee Carmello

==== First US Tour ====
- Mother Superior: Lynne Wintersteller
- Eddie Souther: Chester Gregory

==== Third UK Tour ====
- Mother Superior: Sue Cleaver, Wendi Peters

==== West End (2024) ====
- Deloris van Cartier: Alexandra Burke
- Mother Superior: Lesley Joseph
- Eddie Souther: Lee Mead

== Musical numbers ==
West End

Act I

- "Take Me to Heaven" – Deloris, KT, LaRosa & Backups
- "Fabulous, Baby!" – Deloris, KT & LaRosa
- "Here Within These Walls" – Mother Superior & Nuns
- "How I Got the Calling" – Deloris, Mary Patrick, Mary Lazarus, Mary Robert & Nuns
- "When I Find My Baby" – Shank, TJ, Bones & Dinero
- "Do the Sacred Mass" – Deloris, Mary Patrick, Mary Lazarus, Mary Robert & Barflies
- "I Could Be That Guy" – Eddie & Transients
- "Raise Your Voice" – Deloris, Mary Patrick, Mary Lazarus, Mary Robert & Nuns
- "Take Me to Heaven" (Reprise) – Monsignor Howard, Deloris, Mother Superior, Mary Patrick, Mary Lazarus, Mary Robert, Nuns & Photographers

Act II

- "Sunday Morning Fever" – Monsignor Howard, Deloris, Mother Superior, Eddie, TJ, Bones, Dinero, Nuns & Barflies
- "Lady in the Long Black Dress" – TJ, Bones & Dinero
- "Bless Our Show" – Deloris, Mary Patrick, Mary Lazarus, Mary Robert & Nuns
- "Here Within These Walls" (Reprise) – Mother Superior
- "The Life I Never Led" – Mary Robert
- "Fabulous, Baby!" (Reprise) – Deloris, Backups & Nuns
- "Sister Act" – Deloris
- "When I Find My Baby" (Reprise) – Shank
- "The Life I Never Led" (Reprise) – Mary Robert
- "Sister Act" (Reprise) – Deloris, Mother Superior, Mary Patrick, Mary Lazarus, Mary Robert & Nuns
- "Spread the Love Around" – Mother Superior, Deloris, Mary Patrick, Mary Lazarus, Mary Robert, Nuns & Altar Boy

Broadway

Act I

- "Take Me to Heaven" – Deloris, Michelle & Tina
- "Fabulous, Baby!" – Deloris, Michelle & Tina
- "Here Within These Walls" – Mother Superior & Deloris
- "It's Good to Be a Nun" – Deloris, Mary Patrick, Mary Robert, Mary Lazarus & Nuns
- "When I Find My Baby" – Curtis, Joey, Pablo & TJ
- "I Could Be That Guy" – Eddie & Homeless
- "Raise Your Voice" – Deloris, Mary Patrick, Mary Robert, Mary Lazarus & Nuns
- "Take Me to Heaven" (Reprise) – Deloris, Mary Patrick, Mary Robert, Mary Lazarus & Nuns

Act II

- "Sunday Morning Fever" – Deloris, Mother Superior, Monsignor O'Hara, Eddie, Mary Patrick, Mary Robert, Mary Lazarus, Nuns & Workers
- "Lady in the Long Black Dress" – Joey, Pablo & TJ
- "Haven't Got a Prayer" – Mother Superior
- "Bless Our Show" – Deloris, Mary Patrick, Mary Robert, Mary Lazarus & Nuns
- "The Life I Never Led" – Mary Robert
- "Fabulous, Baby!" (Reprise) – Deloris, Eddie, Nuns & Fantasy Dancers
- "Sister Act" – Deloris
- "When I Find My Baby" (Reprise) – Curtis
- "The Life I Never Led" (Reprise) – Mary Robert
- "Sister Act" (Reprise) – Deloris, Mother Superior, Mary Patrick, Mary Robert, Mary Lazarus & Nuns
- "Spread the Love Around" – The Company

== Critical response ==
=== West End ===
Critical opinion of the West End production has been mixed. Ian Shuttleworth of the Financial Times thought although the plot is filled with "great holes," "It's not a brainless show; Glenn Slater's lyrics are often enjoyably sharp. It's just that whenever the choice arises between creative and commercial, commercial wins out every time."

Charles Spencer in The Telegraph wrote Sister Act "proves more enjoyable on stage than it did on film" and "the cheers and standing ovation at the end were both genuine and deserved." He added, "The book, by Cheers writers Cheri and Bill Steinkellner, is strong, funny and touching. And the disco-inspired score by Disney favourite Alan Menken, with neat lyrics by Glenn Slater, is a cracker. Frankly, what's not to like, especially when you've got a chorus line of jiving nuns singing their hearts out ecstatically?"

While Michael Billington of The Guardian thought Alan Menken's music "has a pounding effectiveness," he rated the musical only two out of five stars, calling it "noisily aggressive" and "a show that feels less like a personally driven work of art than a commercial exploitation of an existing franchise." He continued, "What was originally a fairytale fantasy . . . makes little sense in its new, vulgarised incarnation. In the movie, the music arose naturally from the story: there was even a certain wit about seeing a group of wimpled warblers turned into a cohesive unit. But here, long before the heroine has got to work on their larynxes, they are leaping about the stage like showbiz pros telling us How I Got the Calling. In order to pad out a slight story, every key member of the cast also has to be given a number. As a result, the plot grinds to a halt while we hear about the macho fantasies of a sweaty cop, or the hoodlums weary us with their own wet dreams."

In the Evening Standard, Fiona Mountford rated it four out of five stars and stated, "Whether or not divine intervention is involved, it's a wimple-wibbling, habit-forming triumph."

The Times critic, Benedict Nightingale rated the show three out of five stars, observing that "a rather sweet, sentimental film has been hyped up, coarsened, given what — were the Palladium flown to Times Square — we'd call the big, brash Broadway treatment . . . There's less deft comedy, but much more music, most of it indebted to the 1970s, where the action is now set. That lets Alan Menken, the composer, have a lot of catchy fun with period rock and disco."

David Benedict of Variety cited its "slow start" and "clunky storytelling" but thought "the cumulative effect is shamelessly and irresistibly entertaining."

=== Broadway ===
The Broadway production received mostly positive reviews.

Mark Kennedy of The Associated Press wrote in his review, "This is a musical that hits all the right spots, achieving something close to Broadway grace. It helps that the musical has great original tunes by songwriter Alan Menken and lyricist Glenn Slater that skitters from Motown, to soul and funk, to disco and even a little jokey Barry White. Menken and Slater, who also teamed up for The Little Mermaid, know perfectly how to switch up the mood and tempo.

Elysa Gardner of USA Today gave the show three and a half out of four stars and said, "Sister Act: A Divine Musical Comedy may be less giddily profane, and thought-provoking, than The Book of Mormon, but it has its own distinct and surprising charms. Composer Alan Menken and lyricist Glenn Slater provide original tunes that nod cheekily, but with genuine affection, to that pop era while also propelling the story with a style and exuberance specific to well-crafted musical theater."

Elisabeth Vincentelli of the New York Post also gave the show three and a half out of four stars and wrote, "Big, glitzy numbers are the toast of Broadway musicals. The only thing better? Big, glitzy numbers . . . with nuns! "Sister Act" has plenty of both—and it's one of the season's happiest surprises. Menken evokes the lush, funky sound of Philly soul without falling into mere pastiche: "When I Find My Baby" starts off like bedroom R&B before the lyrics take a hilarious turn. "Take Me to Heaven" and "Spread the Love Around" bloom into full-throttle disco epics, the latter building up to an ecstatic finale.

Thom Geier of Entertainment Weekly gave the show a "B+" and wrote, "It's been a season of ill-conceived or just plain disappointing stage musicals based on movies...Who'd have guessed that the latest iteration of Broadway's recycling trend, Sister Act...would be such a lark? It helps that the show boasts a genuine star turn by newcomer Patina Miller as aspiring singer Deloris Van Cartier. While Sister Act relies on all-new music, thankfully the score is by gifted tunesmith Alan Menken (Little Shop of Horrors, Beauty and the Beast) and his longtime lyricist, Glenn Slater. There are some real melodic standouts here, boosted by the decision to re-set the show in 1977 Philadelphia."

Charles Isherwood of the New York Times gave the show a mixed review and wrote, "I wish I could report that the singing nuns from the Church of Philly Soul are giving those perky Mormons in Africa a run for their money in the unholy hilarity department. But when the jubilant choral numbers subside, as inevitably they must, "Sister Act" slumps back into bland musical-theater grooves and mostly lacks the light of invigorating inspiration. Mr. Menken, who wrote the lustrous period-pop score for "Little Shop of Horrors" (with the lyricist Howard Ashman), is a skillful interpreter of the Philadelphia sound." He did, however, praise Miller's performance, writing she "has a radiant presence and a strong voice with a tangy timbre. As Deloris Van Cartier, a would-be disco diva in 1970s Philly who goes on the lam when the bullets start flying, she truly comes into her own when Deloris sheds her purse full of wisecracks.

Steven Suskin of Variety gave the show an unfavorable review: "New tuner has various assets that place it comfortably in the feel-good entertainment category, and might have launched it to the top last season or even three months ago. But timing is everything. "Sister Act" comes in on the heels of a handful of musicals, including another disco-beat film adaptation (Priscilla Queen of the Desert), and comparisons are not favorable. The Broadway version of 'Sister Act' is glossy, but seems like a worn set of tires repatched too often."

== Awards and nominations ==
=== Original London production ===
| Year | Award Ceremony | Category | Nominee | Result | Ref. |
|---|---|---|---|---|---|
| 2010 | Laurence Olivier Award | Best New Musical | | Nominated | |
| 2010 | Laurence Olivier Award | Best Actress in a Musical | Patina Miller | Nominated | |
| 2010 | Laurence Olivier Award | Best Performance in a Supporting Role in a Musical | Sheila Hancock | Nominated | |
| 2010 | Laurence Olivier Award | Best Theatre Choreographer | Anthony Van Laast | Nominated | |

=== Original Broadway production ===
| Year | Award Ceremony | Category | Nominee | Result | Ref. |
|---|---|---|---|---|---|
| 2011 | Tony Award | Best Musical | | Nominated | |
| 2011 | Tony Award | Best Book of a Musical | Cheri Steinkellner, Bill Steinkellner, and Douglas Carter Beane | Nominated | |
| 2011 | Tony Award | Best Original Score | Alan Menken and Glenn Slater | Nominated | |
| 2011 | Tony Award | Best Performance by a Leading Actress in a Musical | Patina Miller | Nominated | |
| 2011 | Tony Award | Best Performance by a Featured Actress in a Musical | Victoria Clark | Nominated | |
| 2011 | Drama Desk Award | Outstanding Musical | | Nominated | |
| 2011 | Drama Desk Award | Outstanding Actress in a Musical | Patina Miller | Nominated | |
| 2011 | Drama Desk Award | Outstanding Featured Actress in a Musical | Victoria Clark | Nominated | |
| 2011 | Drama Desk Award | Outstanding Music | Alan Menken | Nominated | |
| 2011 | Drama Desk Award | Outstanding Lyrics | Glenn Slater | Nominated | |
| 2011 | Outer Critics Circle Award | Outstanding New Broadway Musical | | Nominated | |
| 2011 | Outer Critics Circle Award | Outstanding New Score (Broadway or Off-Broadway) | Alan Menken and Glenn Slater | Nominated | |
| 2011 | Outer Critics Circle Award | Outstanding Director of a Musical | Jerry Zaks | Nominated | |
| 2011 | Outer Critics Circle Award | Outstanding Actress in a Musical | Patina Miller | Nominated | |
| 2011 | Outer Critics Circle Award | Outstanding Actress in a Musical | Victoria Clark | Nominated | |
| 2011 | Outer Critics Circle Award | Outstanding Featured Actor in a Musical | Chester Gregory | Nominated | |
| 2011 | Outer Critics Circle Award | Outstanding Featured Actress in a Musical | Marla Mindelle | Nominated | |
| 2011 | Outer Critics Circle Award | Outstanding Costume Design | Lez Brotherston | Nominated | |
| 2011 | Outer Critics Circle Award | Outstanding Lighting Design | Natasha Katz | Nominated | |

=== 2022 London Revival ===
| Year | Award Ceremony | Category | Nominee | Result | Ref. |
|---|---|---|---|---|---|
| 2023 | Laurence Olivier Award | Best Musical Revival | | Nominated | |
| 2023 | Laurence Olivier Award | Best Actor in a Supporting Role in a Musical | Clive Rowe | Nominated | |

== Sister Act Nun Run ==
The Sister Act Nuns Run was first held in May 2009, just before the opening of the West End musical. When the team from Sister Act got together with the team from Barnardos it was decided a Nun Run would be a great way to promote the new musical as well as raise money for a great cause.

Nearly 1000 people dressed up as nuns to run the streets of London, and altogether they raised over £30,000. Following this success it was decided that this 4 mile run would be an annual event.

In late 2009 it was announced that the 2010 run was again to take place in May, but this time taking a different route, passing some of London's greatest landmarks such as The Tower of London, Tate Modern, and St. Paul's Cathedral.

To link the run with Sister Act the Musical (other than the fact everyone is dressed as nuns), some of the cast as well as Barnardo's Children's Choir give performances at the start line. This helps highlight the link between Barnardo's and the show contributes to the event, which is organized as a charity event rather than for competitive runners.

The 2010 run sets this as an annual event which the organizers hope will grow year after year.

The 2011 run took place in September 2011 to coincide with the UK national tour.
