= Caroline Keiff =

British theatre performer (born 1981)

- Born: 12 June 1981 (age 45); London
- Occupation: Actress
- Years active: 2002–present

Caroline Keiff is a British theatre performer, best known for her portrayal of Nessarose in Wicked. She was member of the original London cast and performed on the show's opening night of 27 September 2006. She performed in the ensemble and understudied the role of Nessarose. From July 2007, she began to understudy Glinda. She then replaced Katie Rowley Jones in the lead role of Nessarose on 9 June 2008, while continuing to understudy Glinda. She departed on 9 May 2009, after almost three years in the show, and was succeeded by actress Natalie Anderson.

She also appeared in Legally Blonde The Musical as Vivienne Kensington. She was an original London cast member and performed on the show's opening night of 13 January 2010. Keiff played her final performance on 23 October 2010 and was replaced by Siobhan Dillon. On 6 September 2011 she returned to the role for a one-off performance to cover Dillon who was sick, as both other understudies were unavailable.

== Biography ==
Keiff is originally from Brentwood, in Essex, attending St Martin's School. After appearing in a local production of The Sound of Music at the age of nine, she participated in many local amateur musical productions before going to the Guildford School of Acting, graduating with a First Class BA (Hons).

== Theatre credits ==
- The Far Pavilions as Alice, u/s Belinda (Shaftesbury Theatre)
- Guys and Dolls as Sarah Brown (Courtyard Theatre)
- Little Shop of Horrors as Chiffon (Jersey Opera House)
- Hedda Gabler as Thea Elvsted (Norwich Playhouse)
- Cabaret as Sally Bowles (Yvonne Arnaud Theatre)
- Snow White and the Seven Dwarfs (Yvonne Arnaud Theatre)
- 42nd Street as Anytime Annie (Octagon Theatre, Yeovil)
- Summer Holiday (UK Tour)
- Songs for a New World (Guildford Playhouse)
- Beauty and the Beast as Belle (Theatre Royal, Bury St Edmunds)
- Dick Whittington as Alice Fitzwarren (Perth Theatre)
- Mother Goose as Jill (Perth Theatre)
- Wicked as Ensemble, u/s Nessarose, u/s Glinda (Apollo Victoria Theatre)
- Wicked as Nessarose, u/s Glinda (Apollo Victoria Theatre)
- The Rise and Fall of Little Voice (Sheringham Theatre)
- Legally Blonde as Vivienne Kensington (Savoy Theatre)
- The Secret Garden as Lily / Rose (Birmingham Rep Theatre)
- Carmen as Carmen (Stephen Joseph Theatre, Scarborough & The New Vic Theatre, Stoke)
