= Kim Powers =

American writer

Kim Powers is an American writer. His memoir The History of Swimming: A Memoir was a finalist for the Lambda Literary Award for Gay Biography, and his television writing has brought him two Emmys, a Peabody Award, and three Edward R. Murrow Awards. In 2007, Out named him one of their "Out 100," a list of the "top 100 most influential gays or lesbians in the country."

== Early life ==
Powers was born in Texas but currently lives in New York City and Asbury Park, New Jersey with his spouse, Jess Goldstein.

He received an undergraduate degree from Austin College and a Master of Fine Arts from Yale School of Drama.

== Career ==
Powers worked at ABC News from 2008 to 2020, writing for Good Morning America and Primetime. He was also a staff writer for AMC's The Lot, producer for PBS's Great Performances, as well as executive developer for other film and television projects.

His coverage of 9/11 won him an Emmy and a Peabody Award, and while writing for 20/20, his team won three consecutive Edward R. Murrow Awards.

== Selected works ==
=== The History of Swimming (2006) ===
The History of Swimming: A Memoir, published August 13, 2006 by Da Capo Press, is "an examination of the unique relationship shared by twins, and a coming-of-age story of a gay man in the era of AIDS."

Kirkus Reviews provided a starred review, calling the book "a powerful nod to familial bonding, written with verve and genuine affection."

The book received positive reviews from Booklist and The New York Times Book Review. Booklist called The History of Swimming "haunting."

Publishers Weekly provided a mixed review, saying the "uneven writing distracts from the story." However, they noted, "Powers's strength in relating his own personal struggles within the context of his twin's holds this unique memoir together."

Discussing the book, Powers was interviewed on 20/20 with Diane Sawyer, as well as with the Princeton Theological Seminary.

In 2007, the book was a finalist for the Lambda Literary Award for Gay Biography.

=== Dig Two Graves (2015) ===
Dig Two Graves was published December 4, 2015 by Gallery Books. The book received positive reviews from Booklist, School Library Journal, Publishers Weekly, and Kirkus Reviews.

== Publications ==
- The History of Swimming: A Memoir (2006)
- Capote in Kansas: A Ghost Story (2007)
- Dig Two Graves (2015)
- Rules for Being Dead (2020)

== Filmography ==
=== Actor ===
- Finding North (1998)

=== Producer ===
- 20/20 (2018)
- The Lot (1999)

=== Writer ===
- The Year: 2020 (2020)
- What Would You Do? (2020)
- 20/20 (2008, 2010, 2017)
- The Year: 2019 (2019)
- Countdown to the Oscars: 15 Movies That Changed American Cinema (2015)
- 25 Years of Sexy: People Magazine's Sexiest Man Alive! (2010)
- The Barbara Walters Summer Special (2008–2009)
- Fallen Idol (2005)
- Primetime Live: Brad Pitt's Journey to Africa (2005)
- My Big Wild You're-Not-Gonna-Believe This Wedding (2003)
- The Lot (1999)
- Finding North (1998)
