= Andrea Robinson (singer) =

American singer and actress

- Occupations: Actress; singer
- Years active: 1978–present

Andrea Robinson is an American singer and actress. She has been a chorus member and singing voice for other actresses in many films (animated and live action). She also was the opening act for Burt Bacharach. Her most prominent job as a singing voice of another actress is Sister Mary Robert (Wendy Makkena) in Sister Act. Her most prominent role in animation is the singing voice of Queen Athena in The Little Mermaid: Ariel's Beginning.

== Filmography/Soundtrack ==
- American Hot Wax (1978) – Girls Backstage
- Yogi's First Christmas (1980) (TV) (voice) – Singer
- Parent Trap 2 – Singer "Nothin' At All" (1986)
- Falcon Crest – Singer- on camera (2 episodes, 1987)
- Crazy Moon (1987) – Hearing Impaired Teenager
- Riding Bean (1989) (performer: "Bad Girl")
- Sister Act (1992) (voice) – Sister Mary Robert (singing)
- Sister Act 2: Back in the Habit (1993) (voice) – Sister Mary Robert (singing)
- The Princess and the Cobbler (1993) (voice) – Pop vocalist ("Am I Feeling Love?" with Arnold McCuller) (re-edited versions)
- The Pebble and the Penguin (1995) (performer: "Now and Forever")
- Disney Sing-Along Songs Colors of The Wind (1995) (performer: "Can You Feel The Love Tonight" with Arnold McCuller) Uncredited
- Cats Don't Dance (1997) (performer: "Nothing Gonna Stop Us Now")
- MGM Sing-Alongs: Searching for Your Dreams (1997) (performer: "Now and Forever")
- Beauty and the Beast: The Enchanted Christmas (1997) (uncredited) – Chorus
- Star Trek: Deep Space Nine – season 7, episode 15 – Badda Bing Badda Bang (1999) – Blonde
- The Tigger Movie (2000) (performer: "Your Heart Will Lead You Home")
- The Little Mermaid: Ariel's Beginning (2008) (performer: "Athena's Song")
- Sister Act 3 (TBA) (voice) – Sister Mary Robert (singing)
