= Jess Goldstein =

American costume designer

Jess Goldstein is an American costume designer. He has designed over 30 Broadway shows, including Jersey Boys, Take Me Out and Proof. He received a Tony Award for Best Costume Design for his work on the play The Rivals, in 2005.

He teaches at the Yale School of Drama. He is married to Kim Powers.
