= Finding North =

- DVD cover
- Directed by: Tanya Wexler
- Written by: Kim Powers
- Produced by: Stephen Dyer; Steven A. Jones
- Starring: Wendy Makkena; John Benjamin Hickey
- Cinematography: Michael Barrett
- Edited by: Thom Zimny
- Music by: Café Noir
- Distributed by: Cowboy Booking International
- Release date: January 10, 1998 (Sundance Film Festival)
- Running time: 95 minutes
- Country: United States
- Language: English

Finding North is a 1998 gay-themed independent comedy-drama film. Written by Kim Powers and directed by Tanya Wexler, the film stars Wendy Makkena and John Benjamin Hickey.

== Plot ==
Finding North tells the story of Rhonda (Makkena), a bank teller who's depressed upon turning 30, and Travis (Hickey), a gay man who's recently lost his lover to AIDS and grown suicidal. Travis receives an audio tape recorded by his lover, Bobby, before his death which sends him on a scavenger hunt of sorts to Bobby's home town in Texas. Through a series of mishaps, Rhonda ends up accompanying him on his journey. Together they follow Bobby's instructions as best they can, collecting items that represent Bobby's past, despite the many changes to the town in the years since Bobby left. Ultimately they end up at the grave site Bobby's parents had prepared for him decades earlier. They bury the collected items at Bobby's instruction and together start to try "finding north" (an expression of Bobby's; "when things hit rock bottom, sure as hell can't get any further south, might as well start finding north").

== Cast ==
- Wendy Makkena as Rhonda Portelli
- John Benjamin Hickey as Travis Furlong
- Jonathan Walker as Voice of Bobby
- Anne Bobby as Debi
- Rebecca Creskoff as Gina
- Angela Pietropinto as Mrs. Portelli
- Freddie Roman as Mr. Portelli
- Molly McClure as Aunt Bonnie
- Jay Michaelson as Bud
- Yusef Bulos as Taxi Driver
- Garrett Moran as Stripper
- Steven Jones as Funeral Director
- Lynn Metrik as Bank Manager
- Phyllis Cicero as Janice
- Spiro Malas as The Waiter
- Amy Zimmerman as Ticket Agent
- Jonah Marsh as Car Rental Agent
- Bo Barron as Counter Boy
- Cherami Leigh as Gretchen
- Matt Whitton as Young Bobby
- Jody Napolotano as Young Don Franklin
- Gail Cronauer as Mrs. Penn
- R. Bruce Elliott as T.V. Salesman
- Kermit Key as Geezer 1
- Richard Rogers as Geezer 2
- Russ Marker as Geezer 3
- T.J. Morehouse as Drugstore Clerk
- Mary Sheldon as Ellen
- Westin Self as Younger Bobby
- Norman Bennett as Farmer McDonald
- Marisa Perez as Baby Sitter
- Jesse Plemons as Hobo
- Sara Proctor as Princess
- Harrison Lindley as Cowboy
- Bruce Stewart as Cowboy (uncredited)

== Awards and nominations ==
Verzaubert - International Gay & Lesbian Film Festival Rosebud Award - Best Film (nominated)

== DVD release ==
Finding North was released on Region 1 DVD on March 7, 2000.
