= Gene Greytak =

Broker and Actor

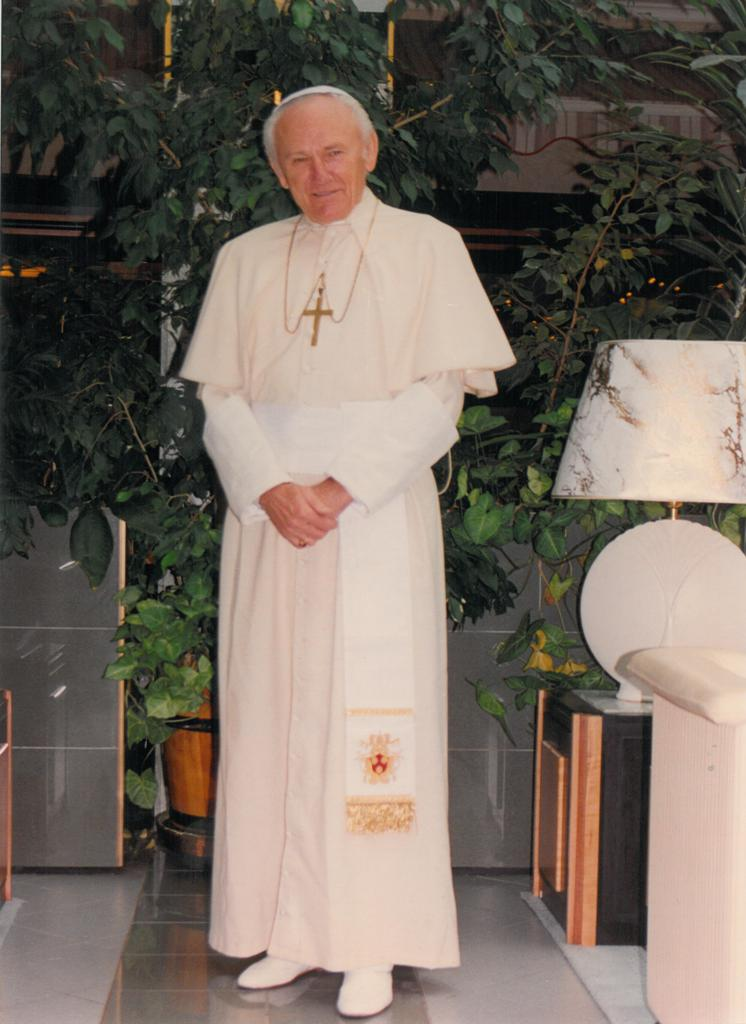
- Greytak as Pope John Paul II in 1993
- Born: Eugene Edward Greytak; November 14, 1925; Trumbull, Connecticut, United States
- Died: February 28, 2010 (aged 84); Tustin, California, United States
- Occupations: impersonator, actor
- Spouse: Dorothy Greytak (c. 1947-2010 his death)

Eugene Edward Greytak (November 14, 1925 – February 28, 2010) was an American real estate broker who made a career as an actor by impersonating Pope John Paul II, to whom he bore a significant resemblance.

Greytak was a Catholic, and had at least the tacit permission of the Archdiocese of Los Angeles to impersonate the pope.

== Filmography ==
=== Film and television ===
Year	Title	Role	Notes
1988	Night Court	The Pope	Episode: "Another Day in the Life"
1988	ALF	Pope John Paul II	2 episodes
1989	Just the Ten of Us	Pope	Episode: "Rock n' Roll Fantasy"
1990	One Night Stand	Pope John Paul II	Episode: "Dennis Wolfberg"
1990	Repossessed	The Pope	
1991	Hot Shots!	Pope John Paul II	
1991	The Golden Girls	The Pope	Episode: "The Pope's Ring"
1992	Sister Act	The Pope	
1993	Murphy Brown	Pope John Paul II	Episode: "The World According to Avery"
1994	Naked Gun 33 1/3: The Final Insult	Pope	
1995	Picket Fences	Pope John Paul II	Episode: "Witness for the Prosecution"
1997	Everybody Loves Raymond	The Pope	Episode: "Neighbors"
1998	The Wayans Bros.	Pope	Episode: "Recipe for Success"
1998	Just the Ticket	Pope	
1999	Ally McBeal	Pope	Episode: "Sex, Lies and Politics"
