= Tyrone Huntley =

British actor (born 1989)

- Born: March 1989 (age 37); Lincoln, England
- Education: Mountview Academy of Theatre Arts
- Occupation: Actor

Tyrone Huntley (born March 1989) is a British actor, best known for his work in musical theatre.

== Career ==
Early theatre roles included TJ in the UK tour of Sister Act, Doctor in the original London cast of The Book of Mormon and Gator in the original London cast of Memphis.

In summer 2016 he played the role of Judas in Jesus Christ Superstar at the Regent's Park Open Air Theatre. He received great acclaim for his performance and was nominated for both the Whatsonstage Award for Best Supporting Actor in a Musical, and the Laurence Olivier Award for Best Actor in a Musical. He reprised the role in summer 2017.

From November 2016 to June 2017 he played C.C. White in Dreamgirls as part of the original London cast. Huntley left the production in June 2017 to return to his award-winning performance in Jesus Christ Superstar.

In 2019 he directed Ain't Misbehavin' at Southwark Playhouse, a musical revue of the life of Fats Waller. The Guardian described it as 'an immensely likable romp through the songs of Fats Waller that is an escapist slice of 1920s Harlem"

Huntley was cast as Barnaby in the 2020 West End revival of Hello, Dolly! which was to star Imelda Staunton in the title role. The run was cancelled due to the outbreak of COVID-19. He subsequently returned to the role of Judas in a socially distanced concert version of Jesus Christ Superstar at Regent's Park Open Air Theatre, sharing the role with Ricardo Afonso.

On December 2, 2021, Huntley began reprising the role of Judas in the North American tour of Jesus Christ Superstar following the arrest of previous Judas performer, James D. Beeks, for his involvement in the 2021 United States Capitol attack.

In 2023, Huntley took part in A Small Light, a Disney + miniseries based on the life of Miep Gies, the Dutch woman who risked her life to shelter Anne Frank's family from the Nazis for more than two years during World War II. Then in June 2024 through to the November, Huntley played the role of Barnaby in the West End revival of Hello, Dolly, which was originally cancelled in 2020 due to the COVID-19 pandemic.

Huntley returned to Jesus Christ Superstar in 2025, where he was cast as Simon in an all-star production at the Hollywood Bowl, which starred Adam Lambert and Cynthia Erivo. This was followed by him being cast as Judas alongside Sam Ryder and Jesus in the West End revival cast, a production that also featured the likes of Jesse Tyler Ferguson, Richard Armitage and Julian Clary..

== Filmography ==
Year	Title	Role	Notes
2020	Red, White and Blue	Leee John	Part of Small Axe anthology
2023	A Small Light	A singer	Miniseries TV

== Theatre credits ==
Year	Title	Role	Theatre	Location	Notes
2011	Sister Act	T.J	—N/a	UK National Tour	
2012	Angel City	Lanx	Edinburgh Fringe	Edinburgh	
2014	The Book of Mormon	The Doctor / Ensemble	Prince of Wales Theatre	West End	
2014-15	Memphis	Gator	Shaftesbury Theatre	West End	
2016	Jesus Christ Superstar	Judas	Regent's Park Open Air Theatre	London	
2016-17	Dreamgirls	C.C. White	Savoy Theatre	West End	
2017	Jesus Christ Superstar	Judas	Regent's Park Open Air Theatre	London	
2018	A Midsummer Night's Dream	Lysander	Watermill Theatre	Bagnor, Berkshire	
2018	Angry	Him	Southwark Playhouse	Off-West End	
2018	21 Chump Street	Justin Laboy	Courtyard Theatre	Off-West End	
2019	Ain't Misbehavin'	Director / Off Stage Swing	Southwark Playhouse	Off-West End	Director
2019	Cinderella	Prince Sebastian	The Other Palace	Off-West End	Preview Workshop
2020	Jesus Christ Superstar	Judas	Regent's Park Open Air Theatre	London	Shared the role with Ricardo Afonso
2021-22	Jesus Christ Superstar	Judas	—N/a	North American tour	
2024	Hello, Dolly!	Barnaby	London Palladium	West End	
2025	Jesus Christ Superstar	Simon Zealotes	Hollywood Bowl	Los Angeles	
2026-27	Jesus Christ Superstar	Judas Iscariot	London Palladium	West End	

=== Awards and nominations ===
Year	Award Ceremony	Category	Production	Result	Ref.
2016	Evening Standard Theatre Awards	Emerging Talent	Jesus Christ Superstar	Won	
2017	Whatsonstage.com Awards	Best Supporting Actor in a Musical	Jesus Christ Superstar	Nominated	
2017	Laurence Olivier Awards	Best Actor in a Musical	Jesus Christ Superstar	Nominated	
2019	Ian Charleson Awards	Commendation	A Midsummer Night's Dream	Nominated	
2019	The Stage Debut Awards	Best Director	Ain't Misbehavin'	Nominated	
