= Wendy Makkena =

American actress

- Born: Wendy Rosenberg Makkena; October 4, 1958 (age 68); Manhattan, New York, U.S.
- Education: Juilliard School
- Occupation: Actress
- Years active: 1982–present
- Spouse: Bob Krakower (m. 1997)
- Children: 1
- Mother: Diana K. Rosenberg

Wendy Rosenberg Makkena (/məˈkɛnə/ mə-KEH-nə; born October 4, 1958) is an American actress best known for playing Sister Mary Robert in the film Sister Act (1992) and its sequel Sister Act 2: Back in the Habit (1993) and numerous other roles in film and television. She has appeared regularly on stage since the 1980s. Her other film credits include Air Bud (1997), State of Play (2009), and A Beautiful Day in the Neighborhood (2019).

== Early life ==
Makkena was born in Manhattan, New York City, and attended the Juilliard School. Her mother, Diana K. Rosenberg, was an astrologer specializing in various fields therein including Western and Indian astrology.

== Career ==
In 1987, she made her Broadway debut in a production of Pygmalion starring Peter O'Toole. She later appeared in Lend Me a Tenor and Side Man. In 1988, she made her film debut appearing in Eight Men Out.

In 1992, Makkena had a supporting role opposite Whoopi Goldberg in the musical comedy film Sister Act as the shy but talented singing nun Sister Mary Robert, a role she reprised in Sister Act 2: Back in the Habit the following year. In both films, singer Andrea Robinson provided the actual vocals. In 1994, she co-starred opposite Christopher Lloyd in the comedy film Camp Nowhere, and in 1997 appeared in Air Bud. In 1998, she played a leading role in the LGBT-related independent comedy-drama Finding North. On television, she starred in the short-lived CBS sitcom A League of Their Own in 1993 and later had recurring roles on NYPD Blue, Judging Amy and NCIS. She also had regular roles on the short-lived The Job (2001–02), Oliver Beene (2003–04), Listen Up (2004–05) and The Mob Doctor (2012–13).

== Personal life ==
Makkena has been married to Bob Krakower, an acting coach, since 1997 and they have a child together.

== Filmography ==
=== Film ===
Key
†	Denotes works that have not yet been released

Year	Title	Role	Notes
1988	Eight Men Out	Kate Jackson	
1992	Sister Act	Sister Mary Robert	
1993	Sister Act 2: Back in the Habit	Sister Mary Robert	
1994	Camp Nowhere	Dr. Celeste Dunbar	
1995	Napoleon	Napoleon's Mom	
1995	The Whiskey Heir	Maggie	Short film
1997	The People	Jean Leary	
1997	Air Bud	Jackie Framm	
1998	Finding North	Rhonda Portelli	
1999	4 a.m.: Open All Night	Woman	Short film
2004	Noise	Del	
2009	State of Play	Greer Thornton	
2017	The Discovery	Mom	
2018	Wanderland	Sandy Tanner	
2019	The Tomorrow Man	Beverly St. Michaels	
2019	Fair Market Value	Jessica	
2019	A Beautiful Day in the Neighborhood	Dorothy Vogel	
2021	Spiked	Margaret	
2024	Sunday Strips	Mrs. Tomas	Short film
2025	Whispers of Freedom	Karin Gueffroy	Short film
TBA	Sister Act 3 †	Sister Mary Robert	

=== Television ===
Year	Title	Role	Notes
1986	Santa Barbara	Katie Timmons	TV series
1989	Dream Street	Harry's Ex-Wife	Episode: "True Love"
1991	Monsters	Maggie Price	Episode: "Desirable Alien"
1991	Dead and Alive: The Race for Gus Farace	Brenda	TV movie
1991	Law & Order	Officer Nicki Sandoval	Episode: "A Death in the Family"
1992	Black Magic	Sally Rowe	TV movie
1993	Class of '96	Margaret Parsons	Episode: "The Accused"
1993	A League of Their Own	Mae Mordabito	6 episodes
1994	NYPD Blue	Det. Sharon LaSalle	3 episodes
1994	Touched by an Angel	Robin Dunwoody	Episode: "The Heart of the Matter"
1995	Serving in Silence: The Margarethe Cammermeyer Story	Mary Newcombe	TV movie
1995	Strange Luck	Louise Brooks	Episode: "The Box"
1996	Death Benefit	Wynn Burkholder	TV movie
1996	On Seventh Avenue	Nadine Jacobs	TV movie
1997	Lies He Told	Patty	TV movie
1997	C-16: FBI	Melanie Harmon	Episode: "Orange Kid"
1997	Dellaventura		Episode: "Fathers"
1998	Trinity		Episodes: "No Secrets", "Hang Man Down"
1999–2000	Judging Amy	Susie Nixon	8 episodes
2001–2002	The Job	Karen McNeil	6 episodes
2002	Law & Order	Janet Weston	Episode: "Born Again"
2002	Philly	Amanda Royce	Episode: "San Diego Padre"
2003–2004	Oliver Beene	Charlotte Caraline Beene	24 episodes
2004–2005	Listen Up	Dana Kleinman	18 episodes
2006	Ghost Whisperer	Jean Godfrey	Episode: "A Grave Matter"
2007	House	Dr. Julie Whitner	Episode: "Needle in a Haystack"
2007	CSI: Crime Scene Investigation	Doris Babinkian	Episode: "Ending Happy"
2007	The Nine	Suzanne	Episode: "Confessions"; Episode: "Man of the Year"
2007	Chuck	National Intelligence Director	Episode: "Chuck Versus the Intersect"
2009	Law & Order: Special Victims Unit	Ellen Van Kuren	Episode: "Transitions"
2009	Desperate Housewives	Fran Schulman	Episode: "Marry Me a Little"
2009	Without a Trace	Jubilee	Episode: "True"
2009–2010	Numb3rs	Kath Berry	Episodes: "Shadow Markets", "Growin' Up"
2010	The Deep End	Judge Joan Anderson	Episode: "An Innocent Man"
2010	Miami Medical	Didi	Episode: "What Lies Beneath"
2011	Melissa & Joey	Suzanne Reback	Episode: "Going the Distance?"
2011, 2012; 2014	NCIS	Dr. Rachel Cranston	4 episodes
2012–2013	The Mob Doctor	Daniella Devlin	13 episodes
2014	Alpha House	Molly P. Andresun	2 episodes
2015	Rizzoli & Isles	IAB Agent Hitchcock	Episode: "The Platform"
2018	The Last O.G.	Krystal	Episode: "Swipe Right"
2019	Bull	Sherri Gibson	Episode: "Security Fraud"
2023	Rabbit Hole	Debra	
2026	Best Medicine	Susan Carlisle	

== Stage ==
Year	Title	Role(s)	Venue	Ref.
1987	Pygmalion	Teamaid	Plymouth Theatre, Broadway	
1988	The Birthday Party	Lulu	Classic Stage Company, Off-Broadway	
1988	The Debutante Ball	Bliss White	New York Stage and Film, New York	
1989	The Loman Family Picnic	Marsha	Manhattan Theatre Club Stage II, Off-Broadway	
1989	Mountain Language	Young Woman	Classic Stage Company, Off-Broadway	
1989	The Birthday Party	Lulu	Classic Stage Company, Off-Broadway	
1989	Lend Me A Tenor	Maggie (replacement)	Royale Theatre, Broadway	
1990	Prin	Melanie	City Center Stage I, Off-Broadway	
1991	The American Plan	Lili	Manhattan Theatre Club, Off-Broadway	
1996	The Shawl	Stella	Jewish Repertory Theatre, Off-Broadway	
1997	The Water Children	Megan	Playwrights Horizons, Off-Broadway	
1998	The Water Children	Megan	The Matrix Theatre Company, Los Angeles	
1998	Side Man	Terry	Criterion Center Stage Right, Off-Broadway	
1998	Side Man	Terry	John Golden Theatre, Broadway	
2007	Harm's Way	Journalist	Hayworth Theatre, Los Angeles	
2008	Harm's Way	Journalist	45th Street Theatre, Off-Broadway	
2013	Bronx Bombers	Carmen	Primary Stages, Off-Broadway	
