= Ako Mitchell =

American actor and filmmaker

- Born: Ako Mitchell
- Occupations: Actor, filmmaker

Ako Mitchell is an American actor and filmmaker. He directed and co-wrote the short film "I'm in the corner with the bluebells", part of the international shorts competition at the 2014 Toronto International Film Festival. Mitchell was nominated for the 2014 Offie for "Best Actor in a Play" ("Klook" in Klook’s Last Stand at London's Park Theatre). In the West End production Fences he portrayed the brother of British actor Lenny Henry. Mitchell has also worked at London's Donmar Warehouse and played opposite Patina Miller in Sister Act at the London Palladium.

== Career ==
Mitchell co-produced the documentary film 500 Years Later, a winner at the Pan-African Film Festival, Black Berlin International Cinema and Harlem International Film Festival.

In December 2017 he played "Nicely-Nicely Johnson" in Guys and Dolls at the Royal Exchange, Manchester. The production was directed by Michael Buffong.

On 9 December 2020, he played "Papa Who" in NBC's live production of Dr. Seuss' The Grinch Musical! alongside Matthew Morrison, Denis O'Hare, Booboo Stewart and Amelia Minto, who played The Grinch, Old Max, Young Max and Cindy Lou Who, respectively.

== Acting credits ==
Stage

Title	Role	Theatre
The Little Prince	Pilot	Savoy Theatre - West End
Spelling Bee	Mitch	Donmar Warehouse
The Lion King	Mufasa	Lyceum Theatre - West End
Ragtime	Coalhouse Walker Jr.	Charing Cross Theatre
The Wild Party	Eddie	The Other Palace
Bonnie & Clyde	Preacher	Arts Theatre
Chess	The Arbiter	Theatre Royal, Drury Lane - West End
The Light in the Piazza	Roy Johnson	Alexandra Palace Theatre
Mean Girls	Principal Duvall	Savoy Theatre - West End

Film

Year	Title	Role
2012	Lake Placid: The Final Chapter	Dennis
2022	Doctor Strange in the Multiverse of Madness	Charlie

Television

Year	Title	Role
2018	Hilda	Wood Man
