= Chester Gregory =

American actor and singer

- Born: Chester Gregory Jr. December 10, 1972 (age 53); Gary, Indiana, United States
- Other name: C.H.E.S.S.
- Occupations: Actor, singer, songwriter
- Years active: 1996–present
- Spouse: Kimberly Hébert Gregory (divorced)
- Children: 1

Chester Gregory, also known as C.H.E.S.S. (born December 10, 1972), is an American actor, singer, and songwriter from Gary, Indiana. His breakthrough came with his portrayal of Jackie Wilson in The Jackie Wilson Story, which led to his Broadway debut as Seaweed in Hairspray. Gregory's other credits include principal roles in Tarzan, Cry-Baby, Dreamgirls and Sister Act. Gregory produced and starred in a look into the life of Jackie Wilson in The Eve of Jackie. Gregory has received numerous awards including the Joseph Jefferson and NAACP Theatre Award.

Aside from acting, Gregory worked on numerous albums and mixtapes before releasing In Search of High Love.

He has been awarded the key to two cities: The key to his hometown the City of Gary, Indiana, and the Key to the City of East Chicago, Indiana.

He has also been awarded Honorary State Representative for the state of Indiana.

== Early life and education ==
Chester Gregory was born in Gary, Indiana on December 10, 1972, to steel mill worker Chester Gregory Sr. and school teacher Edith Gregory. Growing up in the same hometown as Michael Jackson inspired Gregory to become an artist.

After years of performing in local talent shows and workshops for young performers, Gregory auditioned for the Emerson School for Visual and Performing Arts. His first two attempts were unsuccessful, but he was accepted on his third by the time he reached high school.

He progressed to Columbia College Chicago, where he majored in Musical Theatre. Shortly before graduating with a Bachelor of Fine Arts degree, Gregory earned the leading role as Jesus in Jesus Christ Superstar. The production was co-directed by David Cromer.

After graduating, Gregory began teaching acting classes and directing several productions at East Chicago Central High School and Indiana University Northwest.

== Career ==
=== Acting career ===
Theatre

The Jackie Wilson Story culminated at New York's Apollo Theater and received rave reviews from the New York Times. In 2003, Gregory met and performed for the legendary "King of Pop," Michael Jackson, who gave Gregory a standing ovation. That same week, Gregory made his Broadway debut as Seaweed in the Tony Award-winning musical Hairspray. He remained in the cast for two and a half years, then moved on to originate and star in other principal roles on Broadway including Tarzan (Terk), Cry-Baby (Dupree), Sister Act (Eddie Souther) and Motown: The Musical (Berry Gordy). He also performed internationally while touring with Motown: the Musical, Dreamgirls, and Sister Act. Other work includes August Wilson’s Fences and Two Trains Running.

Television/Film

Gregory's television and film work include roles in Revival! produced by Harry Lennix, Ish, The Testing Camera, and American Dreams and Films produced by Todrick Hall. He has also appeared on The Daily Show (Comedy Central), The View (ABC) and David Tutera’s CELEBrations with Kym Whitley.

Current/Future Work

In the spring of 2013, Gregory created, produced and starred in the one-man show, The Eve of Jackie, which premiered in New York to sold out audiences at 54 Below and at Chicago's Black Ensemble Theatre. That summer his production was selected to headline The National Black Theatre Festival. To date, Gregory continues to perform The Eve of Jackie to sold out audiences across the country.

In 2015, Gregory founded a workshop titled “Manifest Your Inner Shine”. That same year he received his honorary doctorate degree from his alma mater, Columbia College, and had the honor of giving the commencement address. The following year Gregory founded Lucid Life, an organization and production company that provides workshops and master classes to high school students, college students, and artists who seek professional development. He has also led acting and singing workshops at Donda's House and other schools and organizations throughout New York, Florida, and the Chicago area.

=== Recording career ===
Gregory, who records under his artist name CHΞSS, has spent much of his career in the studio. He has released several albums and worked with music legends such as Phil Collins, Marc Shaiman, Henry Krieger and Artie Butler. Dr. Gregory worked with PJ Morton and Eric Roberson for his album In Search of High Love. Other collaborations include Ledisi, Keyon Harrold, Dot Da Genius, MaliMusic, 88-Keys, 9th Wonder, The Pocket Queen, Cory Henry, and Chance The Rapper. Gregory has a new project titled RETRO(GRADE) under his artist name, CHΞSS.

== Stage credits ==
Year	Title	Role	Theater	Notes
2003	Hairspray	Seaweed	Neil Simon Theatre	Broadway Debut
2006	Tarzan	Terk	Richard Rodgers Theatre	
2008	Shrek the Musical	Donkey	5th Avenue Theatre	Seattle Pre-Broadway Try-out
2008	Cry Baby	Dupree	Marquis Theatre	
2008	Grand Theft Auto IV	The Crowd of Liberty City (voice)		
2009	Dreamgirls	James "Thunder" Early	Various	(National Tour)
2011	Sister Act	Eddie Souther	Broadway Theatre	Reprised the role on the 2012 National Tour
2014	Motown: The Musical	Berry Gordy	Nederlander Theatre	Replacement Barry on the original National Tour Reprised the role on Broadway in 2016 and again on the second National Tour
