= Fred Applegate (actor) =

American actor, singer and dancer

- Born: February 20, 1953 (age 73)
- Occupations: Actor; singer; dancer

Frederick Applegate (born February 20, 1953) is an American actor, singer and dancer.

== Early life and education ==
Applegate grew up in Maplewood, New Jersey, and South Orange, New Jersey. He attended Columbia High School and was on the original Ultimate (Frisbee) team. He graduated from Northwestern University.

== Career ==
=== Stage ===
Applegate played Cogsworth in the national tour of Beauty and the Beast. He originated the roles of Inspector Kemp and The Blind Hermit in the Broadway musical Young Frankenstein (2007). He originated the role of the Monsignor in the Broadway production of Sister Act (2011) and the role of Father Jack O'Brien in The Last Ship, which premiered on Broadway in October 2014.

Other Broadway credits include M. Dindon/M. Renaud in La Cage aux Folles (2010), Max Bialystock in The Producers (replacement, 2003; in the West End production in 2005) and as Franz Leibkind in the first national tour. He also played Max Detweiler in The Sound of Music. (1998).

Applegate appeared Off-Broadway at Lincoln Center's Mitzi Newhouse Theater in the musical Happiness in 2009, directed and choreographed by Susan Stroman. Applegate played the role of "Panisse" in the Encores! staged concert of Fanny in February 2010. He participated in a reading of a new musical, Presto Change-O in December 2014, directed by Marc Bruni, as a presentation of the Barrington Stage Company Musical Theatre Lab. He appeared in the national tour of Anything Goes, as "Moonface Martin", which started in October 2012.

Applegate has played the role of the Wizard in the Broadway production Wicked, played the role of Constable Joe in the Broadway musical Tuck Everlasting, and also played the role of Uncle Patrick Carney in the Broadway play The Ferryman.

Applegate was a member of the resident acting company of the Guthrie Theatre for three years.

In 2022, he played Arvide Abernathy in Guys and Dolls at the Kennedy Center.

=== Voice, television and film ===
Applegate's voice can be recognized as the narrator of documentaries for PBS, National Geographic, Disney, Bravo, and A&E. In 2000, he narrated the AMC documentary The Unknown Peter Sellers. He has guest starred in over 150 episodes of television including Seinfeld, Cosby, Growing Pains, FM, Malcolm in the Middle, ER, Murphy Brown, Newhart, Will & Grace and many others. He portrayed the Pointy-Haired Boss in the 1997 live-action pitch pilot of Dilbert, which was not picked up for series. His film credits include Georgia Rule, Stuart Saves His Family (1995), and The Producers.
