= Chris Jarman =

British stage and television actor

Chris Jarman is a British stage and television actor. He is the voice-over for E4's Tattoo Fixers. He is also known for providing the voice of The Mechanic in Thunderbirds Are Go. Jarman played Doctor Dillamond, and understudied the role of the Wizard of Oz, in the West End production of the musical Wicked from July 2018 to July 2019. As of March 2025, he is starring as Hades in the West End's Hadestown.

== Work ==
Stage (selected)
Production	Role	Location
Harry Potter and the Cursed Child	Rubeus Hagrid / The Sorting Hat	West End (Palace Theatre)
The Book of Mormon	General	West End (Prince of Wales Theatre)
The Comedy of Errors	Antipholus of Ephesus	Royal National Theatre
Sister Act	Shank	West End (London Palladium)
Gone With The Wind	Big Sam	West End (New London Theatre)
The Tempest	Adrian	Royal Shakespeare Theatre and West End (Novello Theatre)
Antony and Cleopatra	Eros / Soothsayer	Swan Theatre and West End (Novello Theatre)
Julius Caesar	Metellus Cimber	Royal Shakespeare Theatre
Wicked	Doctor Dillamond / understudy Wizard	West End (Apollo Victoria Theatre)
Once on This Island	Tonton Julian	Regent's Park Open Air Theatre
Hadestown	Hades	West End (Lyric Theatre)
Film and TV
Year	Title	Role
2020	The Lady of Heaven	Bilal
2016–2020	Thunderbirds Are Go	The Mechanic (voice) and other voices
2011	Johnny English Reborn	Michael Tembe
2011	Doctor Who	Dancer
2009	Sand Serpents	Sgt. Wilson
2008	The Journey Home	Sugar Daddy
2004	Churchill: The Hollywood Years	U.S. Marine
2004	Spartacus	Nordo
1998	Pirates	Pirate
