= Katie Rowley Jones =

British musical theatre actress (born 1978)

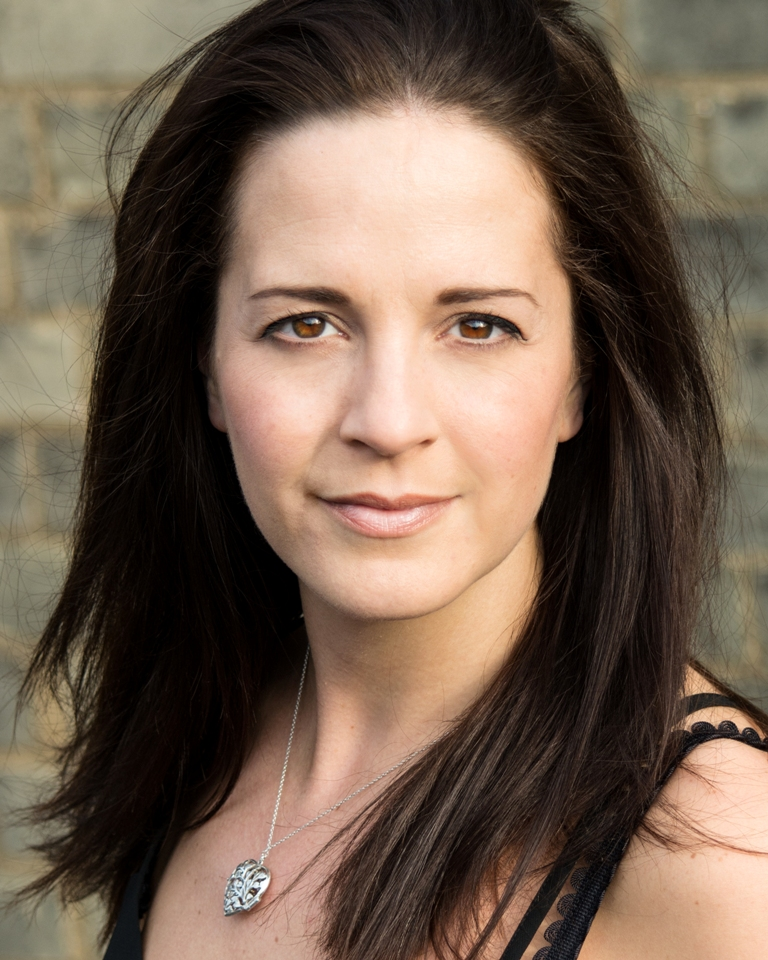
- Katie Rowley Jones
- Born: 1978 (age 46–47); Cambridge, England
- Education: University of Nottingham; Guildford School of Acting
- Occupation: Musical theatre actress
- Spouse: Christopher Adams
- Children: 1

Katie Rowley Jones (born c. 1978) is a British musical theatre actress, best known for originating the role of Nessarose in the West End production of Wicked.

== Early life and education ==
Katie Rowley Jones was born in Cambridge, and is one of four sisters. She received a B.A. (Hons) degree in law from the University of Nottingham. She did not begin her professional training until the age of 22, when she went on to study musical theatre at the Guildford School of Acting (GSA). She attended Bedford High School for Girls and then went to Hills Road Sixth Form College in Cambridge.

== Career ==
Rowley Jones is best known for creating the role of Nessarose in the London production of Wicked. Performances began on 27 September 2006, following previews from 7 September. After at least two years with the company, she played her final performance on 7 June 2008, and was replaced by her understudy, Caroline Keiff.

She also originated the role of Sister Mary Robert in the London production of Sister Act. Performances of the show began on 2 June 2009, following previews from 7 May. The show closed on 30 October 2010.

Rowley Jones later returned to the London production of Wicked, taking over the role she originated, Nessarose, from Lillie Flynn. She began her new contract on 29 October 2012, and was also the second understudy for Elphaba. Her first Elphaba performance took place on 7 August 2013. She continued to perform in the show for the next cast change in November 2013 and continued on for her third consecutive contract beginning in October 2014. It was announced on 17 July 2015 that she would continue on for her fourth year in the role. As of November 2013, she no longer covers Elphaba. She stayed with the show as Nessarose until 28 January 2017, when Sarah McNicolas replaced her.

== Theatre credits ==
- Grease as Sandy
- The Rocky Horror Show as Janet (30th Anniversary Production)
- Whistle Down the Wind as Swallow (UK Tour)
- Beauty and the Beast as Belle (UK Tour)
- Wicked as Nessarose (2006-2008/2012-2017, Original London Production)
- Sister Act as Sister Mary Robert (2009-2010, Original London Production)
- Snow White and the Seven Dwarfs as Snow White (Winter 2010, Gordon Craig Theatre, Stevenage)

== Recognition ==
- Daily Express wrote "There is also a touching and noteworthy performance by Katie Rowley Jones as the novitiate Sister Mary Robert. She exudes an uncertainty about becoming a nun, having never experienced much of life and the song she sings, The Life I Never Led, is truly moving." Daily Telegraph wrote "Among the support, Katie Rowley Jones makes a sweet novice."
