= Lynne Wintersteller =

American actress

Lynne Wintersteller is an American actress best known for her work in the theatre. A gifted soprano, she has appeared in several musicals including starring in the original production of Maltby and Shire's off-Broadway musical Closer Than Ever in 1989 at the Cherry Lane Theatre. A critical success, Closer than Ever ran for 312 performances and a CD recording was made on the RCA Victor label. For her performance in the production she was nominated for a Drama Desk Award for Outstanding Actress in a Musical. Wintersteller also starred as Mother Jones in Cheryl E. Kemeny's "Mother Jones and the Children's Crusade" at the New York Musical Festival in 2014.

Wintersteller's other off-Broadway credits include Sadie in Isaiah Sheffer's The Rise of David Levinsky at the John Houseman Theatre in 1987 and Amy in Melissa Manchester's I Sent a Letter to My Love at Primary Stages in 1995. She made her Broadway debut in the original 1993 production of Rodgers and Hammerstein's A Grand Night for Singing which was produced by the Roundabout Theatre Company. The production garnered a Tony Award nomination for Best Musical. In 2005 she appeared as Diane de Poitiers in Beth Blatt's The Mistress Cycle at The Lion at Theater Row.

Wintersteller has also been active in theatre throughout the United States. She portrayed Grace Farrell in both the First & Fourth National Tours of Charles Strouse's Annie, Sarah in the national tour of Stephen Sondheim's Company and recently Mother Superior in "Sister Act". She has also appeared in regional theatre productions at such theatres as the Pittsburgh Public Theatre, the Kennedy Center, the St. Louis Repertory, the Walnut Street Theatre, the Alley Theatre, the Goodspeed Opera House, and Syracuse Stage to name just a few.

Wintersteller is a graduate of the University of Maryland, College Park ( BA Theatre Arts Degree, 1978) and Ohio State University (MFA).
