= Julia Sutton (actress) =

English actress (1938–2026)

Julia Sutton (7 December 1938 – 30 March 2026) was an English actress and singer.

== Life and career ==
Sutton appeared in the film Half a Sixpence, the second series of Albert and Victoria, Upstairs, Downstairs, Dixon of Dock Green, and Father Brown.

She appeared on stage as Nancy in Oliver!, Mme. Dindon in La Cage aux Folles, Hortense in Martin Guerre (1995), as The Bird Woman in Mary Poppins (2004–05), and as Sister Mary Lazarus in Sister Act the Musical at the London Palladium.

Sutton also appeared in a number of other BBC productions, including the TV musical Pickwick in 1969, and in the dystopian drama 1990 as a Non-Citizen in a 1977 episode of the same name. Sutton made many appearances on BBC TV's The Good Old Days. She continued her acting work in adverts, pantomimes and West End productions.

She married dancer Don Vernon and they had four children: Kate-Alice Woodbridge (also a West End performer), Harvey, Nicholas, and Stuart Woodbridge. Sutton died on 30 March 2026, at the age of 87.
