= Audrie J. Neenan =

American actress

Audrie J. Neenan (born October 28, 1950) is an American actress. She is best known on screen for her role as the raucous, abrasive female rapist Ray Parkins in the 1983 action film Sudden Impact and for playing judges in the TV series Law & Order and Law & Order: Special Victims Unit as Lois Preston. Many of her roles have been portrayals of intimidating female figures such as judges, policewomen and mouthy waitresses.

== Early years ==
Born in Cedar Rapids, Iowa, Neenan has a brother and four sisters. Her mother and aunt performed in vaudeville as the Sunshine Sisters with their brother as their pianist. Her desire to be an actress was ignited when at age 9 she watched her sister act in The Diary of Anne Frank. When she was in the seventh grade she moved with her family to Harrisburg, Pennsylvania, after her father bought a McDonald's franchise there. She worked in that business and acted in school plays. She graduated from Bishop McDevitt High School in Harrisburg, then attended Barat College for Women in Lake Forest, Illinois, and acted there.

== Career ==
Neenan appeared as a waitress in Funny Farm (1988) and as a policewoman in See No Evil, Hear No Evil (1989). In 2006, Neenan had a small role as a bar waitress in Martin Scorsese's The Departed. In 2008, she appeared in the John Patrick Shanley-directed sexual abuse drama Doubt, starring Meryl Streep and Philip Seymour Hoffman.

Neenan has appeared in various TV shows such as Not Necessarily the News, Friends, Lois & Clark: The New Adventures of Superman, Ally McBeal, The Cosby Show, and The Tonight Show Starring Johnny Carson. She has also worked as a stage actress and made her Broadway debut opposite Faye Dunaway in William Alfred's The Curse of an Aching Heart and appeared at The Apollo and the Chicago Shakespeare Festival.

== Selected filmography ==
- Towing (1978) - Irate Lady
- Somewhere in Time (1980) - Maid in Play (1912)
- Sudden Impact (1983) - Ray Parkins
- Love at Stake (1987) - Mrs. Babcock
- Funny Farm (1988) - Ivy
- See No Evil, Hear No Evil (1989) - Policewoman and Marilyn
- Wedding Band (1989) - Judy
- Slippery Slope (2006) - Floozy
- The Departed (2006) - Woman at Bar #2
- Ghost Town (2008) - Admitting Nurse
- Doubt (2008) - Sister Raymond
- BuzzKill (2012) - Waitress
- Shelter (2014) - Shelter Worker 2
- Crashing (2017) - Mrs Rita Holmes, Pete's mom
- Puzzle (2018) - Aunt Emily
