= Billy Crystal filmography =

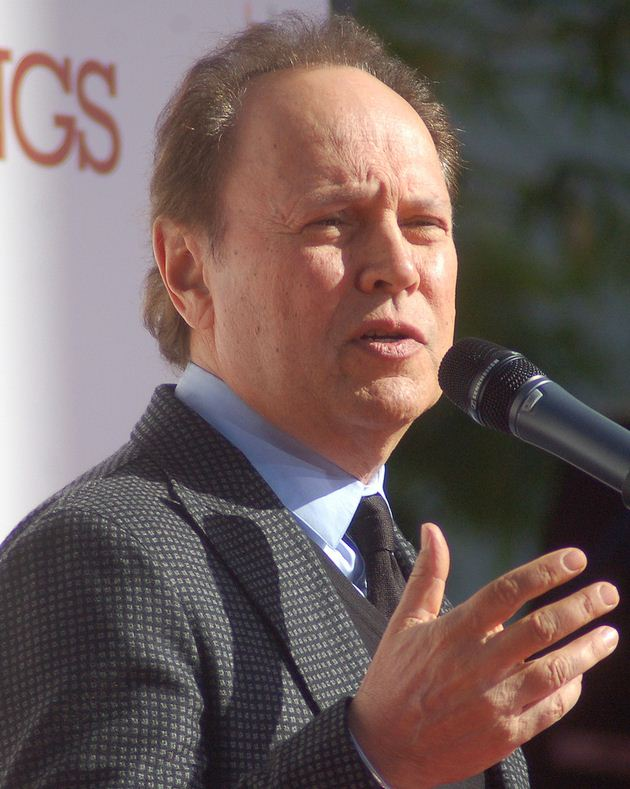
- Crystal in January 2013
- Film: 36
- Television series: 58
- Theatre: 2

Billy Crystal is an American actor, comedian, singer, writer, producer, director and television host.

== Career ==
Crystal started his career in the 1970s for playing Jodie Dallas on the ABC sitcom Soap and became a Hollywood film star during the late 1980s and 1990s, appearing in the critical and box office successes When Harry Met Sally... (1989), City Slickers (1991), and Analyze This (1999) and providing the voice of Mike in the Monsters, Inc. franchise. He has hosted the Academy Awards nine times from 1990 through the 84th Academy Awards in 2012.

== Film ==
Year	Title	Role	Notes
1978	Rabbit Test	Lionel Carpenter	
1984	This Is Spinal Tap	Morty The Mime	
1986	Running Scared	Danny Constanzo	
1987	The Princess Bride	Miracle Max	
1987	Throw Momma from the Train	Larry Donner	
1988	Memories of Me	Abbie Polin	Also writer and producer
1989	When Harry Met Sally...	Harry Burns	
1991	City Slickers	Mitch Robbins	Also executive producer
1992	Horton Hatches the Egg	Narrator	Voice
1992	Mr. Saturday Night	Buddy Young Jr.	Also director, writer, and producer
1994	City Slickers II: The Legend of Curly's Gold	Mitch Robbins	Also writer and producer
1995	Forget Paris	Mickey Gordon	Also director, writer, and producer
1996	Hamlet	First Gravedigger	
1997	Fathers' Day	Jack Lawrence	
1997	Deconstructing Harry	Larry	
1998	My Giant	Sam 'Sammy' Kamin	Also writer and producer
1999	Get Bruce	Himself	Documentary film
1999	Analyze This	Dr. Ben Sobel	Also executive producer
2000	The Adventures of Rocky and Bullwinkle	Mattress Salesman	Uncredited
2001	America's Sweethearts	Lee Phillips	Also writer and producer
2001	Monsters, Inc.	Mike Wazowski	Voice
2002	Mike's New Car	Mike Wazowski	Voice; short film
2002	Analyze That	Dr. Ben Sobel	Also executive producer
2004	Howl's Moving Castle	Calcifer the Fire-Demon	Voice; English dub
2006	Cars	Mike Wazowski Car	Voice; cameo
2007	Mr. Warmth: The Don Rickles Project	Himself (interviewee)	Documentary film
2010	Tooth Fairy	Jerry	Uncredited
2010	I'm Still Here	Himself	
2012	Small Apartments	Burt Walnut	
2012	Parental Guidance	Artie Decker	Also producer
2013	Monsters University	Mike Wazowski	Voice
2014	Party Central	Mike Wazowski	Voice; short film
2016	The Comedian	Himself	
2018	Untogether	David	
2019	Standing Up, Falling Down	Marty	Also executive producer
2021	Here Today	Charlie Burnz	Also director, writer, and producer

== Television ==
Year	Title	Role	Notes
1976	All in the Family	Al Bender	Episode: "New Year's Wedding"
1976	The Dean Martin Celebrity Roast	Himself	Episode: "Muhammad Ali Roast"
1977	The Midnight Special	Himself	Television special
1977	SST: Death Flight	David	Television film
1977–1981	Soap	Jodie Dallas	73 episodes
1978	The Love Boat	Newton Weames	Episode: "Mike & Ike; The Witness; Kissing Bandit"
1979	Breaking Up Is Hard to Do	Danny Doyle	Television film
1980	Enola Gay: The Men, the Mission, the Atomic Bomb	Lt. Jacob "Jake" Beser	Television film
1980	Animalympics	Rugs Turkell / Joey Gongolong / Art Antica	Voices; television film
1981	Darkroom	Paddy	Episode: "Make-Up"
1982	The Billy Crystal Comedy Hour	Himself (host)	5 episodes; also writer
1984	Billy Crystal: A Comic's Line	Himself	Television special
1984	Saturday Night Live	Himself (host)	2 episodes
1984–1985	Saturday Night Live	Various	18 episodes; also writer
1985	Simon & Simon	Ben Crane	Episode: "Quint Is Out"
1985	Faerie Tale Theatre	Larry Pig	Episode: "The Three Little Pigs"
1986–1988	Sesame Street	Ricky	2 episodes
1986	Comic Relief	Himself (host)	Benefit show
1986	Billy Crystal: Don't Get Me Started	Himself	Stand-up special
1987	Billy Crystal: Don't Get Me Started – The Lost Minutes	Himself	Short
1987	Comic Relief '87	Himself (host)	Benefit show
1987	29th Annual Grammy Awards	Himself (host)	Television special
1988	30th Annual Grammy Awards	Himself (host)	Television special
1989	31st Annual Grammy Awards	Himself (host)	Television special
1989	Comic Relief III	Himself (host)	Benefit show
1989	Billy Crystal: Midnight Train to Moscow	Himself	Stand-up special
1990	62nd Academy Awards	Himself (host)	Television special
1991	63rd Academy Awards	Himself (host)	Television special
1991	Comic Relief IV	Himself (host)	Benefit show
1992	64th Academy Awards	Himself (host)	Television special
1992	Comic Relief V	Himself (host)	Benefit show
1992	The Larry Sanders Show	Himself	Episode: "Talk Show"
1993	65th Academy Awards	Himself (host)	Television special
1994	The Critic	Gary Grossman	Voice; Episode: "L.A. Jay"
1994	In Search of Dr. Seuss	The Voice of America	Voice; television film
1994	Comic Relief VI	Himself (host)	Benefit show
1995	Comic Relief VII	Himself (host)	Benefit show
1995	Frasier	Jack	Voice; Episode: "Leapin' Lizards"
1996	Muppets Tonight	Himself	Episode: "Billy Crystal"
1997	Friends	Tim	Episode: "The One with the Ultimate Fighting Champion"
1997	69th Academy Awards	Himself (host)	Television special
1998	70th Academy Awards	Himself (host)	Television special
1998	Comic Relief VIII	Himself (host)	Benefit show
2000	72nd Academy Awards	Himself (host)	Television special
2001	61*	None	Television film; director and executive producer
2002	The Bernie Mac Show	Himself	Episode: "Secrets and Lies"
2002	Liberty's Kids	John Adams	Voice; 6 episodes
2004	76th Academy Awards	Himself (host)	Television special
2005	59th Tony Awards	Himself (presenter)	Television special
2006	Comic Relief 2006	Himself (host)	Benefit show
2011	83rd Academy Awards	Himself (presenter)	Tribute to Bob Hope
2012	84th Academy Awards	Himself (host)	Television special
2013–2014	Web Therapy	Garreth Pink	3 episodes
2014	700 Sundays	Himself	Television special, HBO
2015	The Comedians	Billy Crystal	13 episodes; also writer and executive producer
2017	Modern Family	Himself	Episode: "Brushes with Celebrity"
2021–2024	Monsters at Work	Mike Wazowski	Voice; 20 episodes
2021	Never Have I Ever	Himself	Episode: "...been a perfect girl"
2023	Jimmy Kimmel Live!	Double Admiral Crystal	Episode: "Cate Blanchett/Patrick Mahomes/Dave Franco"
2024	Before	Eli	Miniseries; also executive producer
2025	97th Academy Awards	Himself (presenter)	Presented Best Picture with Meg Ryan
2026	98th Academy Awards	Himself	Tribute to Rob Reiner

== Theatre ==
Year	Title	Role	Venue	Ref
2004–05	700 Sundays	Himself	Broadhurst Theater, Broadway	
2013–14	700 Sundays	Himself	Imperial Theatre, Broadway	
2021	Mr. Saturday Night	Buddy Young, Jr.	Goodman Theater, Chicago	
2022	Mr. Saturday Night	Buddy Young, Jr.	Nederlander Theater, Broadway	
2023	Gutenberg! The Musical!	Producer (Only night only)	James Earl Jones Theater, Broadway	
2026	860	Himself	Imperial Theatre, Broadway	
