= List of awards and nominations received by Billy Crystal =

Billy Crystal awards and nominations
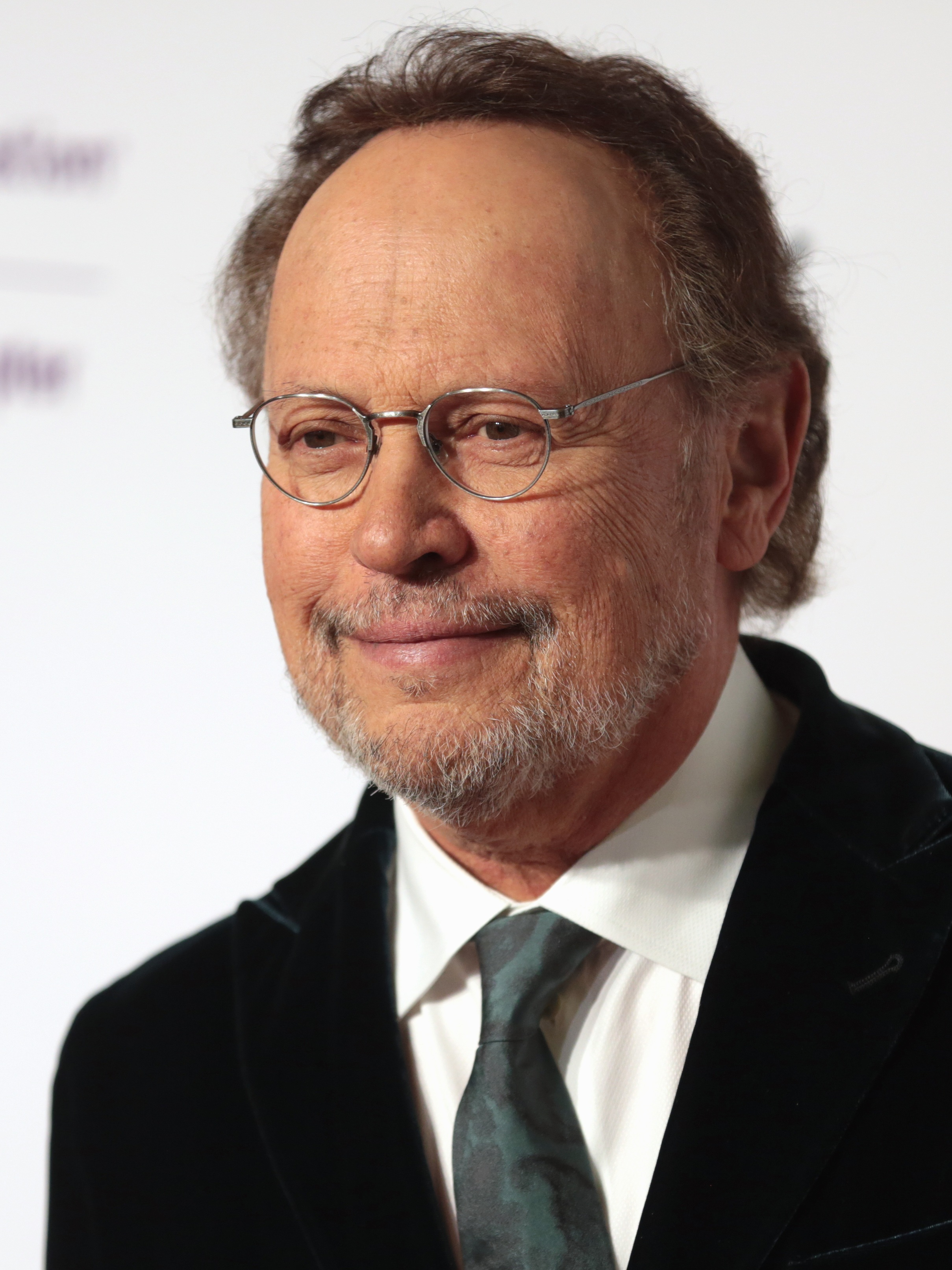
- Crystal in 2018
Awards and nominations
Award	Wins	Nominations
Emmy Awards	6	21
Grammy Awards	0	2
Golden Globes	0	3
Tony Awards	1	3

Totals (Note: Certain award groups do not simply award one winner. They acknowledge several different recipients, have runners-up, and have third place. Since this is a specific recognition and is different from losing an award, runner-up mentions are considered wins in this award tally. For simplification and to avoid errors, each award in this list has been presumed to have had a prior nomination.)
- Wins: 7
- Nominations: 29

The following is a list of awards and nominations received by Billy Crystal.

Billy Crystal is an American stand-up comedian, actor, writer, and director. He has received several awards including five Primetime Emmy Awards, a Tony Award, and a Drama Desk Award as well as nominations for three Golden Globe Award and two Grammy Award.

Crystal won his first Primetime Emmy Award in 1989 for his hosting abilities of the 31st Grammy Awards. He won his second Emmy in 1991 for hosting, and writing the material at the 63rd Academy Awards. For his work on television, Crystal has received several awards and nominations. Among them are 21 Emmy Award nominations, with six wins. For his work on film, he received three Golden Globe Award for Best Actor in a Motion Picture – Musical or Comedy nominations for his performances as the lead in the romantic comedy When Harry Met Sally (1989), a man on the verge of a midlife crisis in the comedy City Slickers (1991), and borscht belt comic in Mr. Saturday Night (1992).

For his work on stage, he won the Tony Award for Best Special Theatrical Event for his one man show 700 Sundays (2005). He received further Tony-nominations for Best Actor in a Musical and Tony Award for Best Book of a Musical for the Broadway musical Mr. Saturday Night (2022). He received two Grammy Award nominations for his comedy album, You Look Marvelous in 1987, and his Spoken Word Album, Still Foolin' Em in 2013.

Over his career, Crystal has received several honors including a star on the Hollywood Walk of Fame in 1991, the Mark Twain Prize for American Humor in 2007, the Critics' Choice Lifetime Achievement Award in 2021, and the Kennedy Center Honors in 2023.

== Major Associations ==
=== Emmy Awards ===
Year	Category	Nominated work	Result	Ref.
Primetime Emmy Awards
1985	Individual Performance in a Variety or Music Program	Saturday Night Live	Nominated	
1987	Individual Performance in a Variety or Music Program	29th Annual Grammy Awards	Nominated	
1988	Individual Performance in a Variety or Music Program	An All-Star Toast to the Improv	Nominated	
1988	Individual Performance in a Variety or Music Program	30th Annual Grammy Awards	Nominated	
1989	Individual Performance in a Variety or Music Program	31st Annual Grammy Awards	Won	
1990	Outstanding Variety, Music, or Comedy Special	Midnight Train to Moscow	Nominated	
1990	Individual Performance in a Variety or Music Program	Midnight Train to Moscow	Nominated	
1990	Outstanding Writing in a Variety or Music Program	Midnight Train to Moscow	Won	
1991	Individual Performance in a Variety or Music Program	63rd Academy Awards	Won	
1991	Outstanding Writing in a Variety or Music Program	63rd Academy Awards	Won	
1992	Individual Performance in a Variety or Music Program	64th Academy Awards	Nominated	
1992	Writing in a Variety or Music Program	64th Academy Awards	Won	
1993	Individual Performance in a Variety or Music Program	65th Academy Awards	Nominated	
1996	Individual Performance in a Variety or Music Program	Comic Relief VII	Nominated	
1997	Individual Performance in a Variety or Music Program	69th Academy Awards	Nominated	
1998	Individual Performance in a Variety or Music Program	70th Academy Awards	Won	
2000	Individual Performance in a Variety or Music Program	72nd Academy Awards	Nominated	
2001	Outstanding Television Movie	61*	Nominated	
2001	Outstanding Directing for a Miniseries, Movie or Special	61*	Nominated	
2004	Individual Performance in a Variety or Music Program	76th Academy Awards	Nominated	
2012	Outstanding Special Class Program	84th Academy Awards	Nominated	
2012	Outstanding Writing for a Variety Special	84th Academy Awards	Nominated	
2014	Outstanding Variety Special	700 Sundays	Nominated	
2014	Outstanding Writing for a Variety Special	700 Sundays	Nominated	

=== Golden Globe Awards ===
Year	Category	Nominated work	Result	Ref.
1990	Best Actor – Motion Picture Musical or Comedy	When Harry Met Sally...	Nominated	
1992	Best Actor – Motion Picture Musical or Comedy	City Slickers	Nominated	
1993	Best Actor – Motion Picture Musical or Comedy	Mr. Saturday Night	Nominated	

=== Grammy Awards ===
Year	Category	Nominated work	Result	Ref.
1986	Best Comedy Album	You Look Marvelous	Nominated	
2014	Best Spoken Word Album	Still Foolin' Em	Nominated	
2023	Best Musical Theater Album	Mr. Saturday Night	Nominated	

=== Tony Awards ===
Year	Category	Nominated work	Result	Ref.
2005	Best Special Theatrical Event	700 Sundays	Won	
2022	Best Actor in a Musical	Mr. Saturday Night	Nominated	
2022	Best Book of a Musical	Mr. Saturday Night	Nominated	

== Other theatre awards ==
Organizations	Year	Category	Work	Result	Ref.
Drama Desk Awards	2005	Outstanding Solo Performance	700 Sundays	Won	
Drama Desk Awards	2022	Outstanding Actor in a Musical	Mr. Saturday Night	Nominated	
Drama Desk Awards	2022	Outstanding Book of a Musical	Mr. Saturday Night	Nominated	
Drama League Award	2022	Contribution to Theatre		Won	
Drama League Award	2022	Distinguished Performance	Mr. Saturday Night	Nominated	
Outer Critics Circle Awards	2005	Outstanding Solo Performance	700 Sundays	Won	
Outer Critics Circle Awards	2022	Outstanding Book of a Musical	Mr. Saturday Night	Nominated	

== Miscellaneous Awards ==
Organizations	Year	Category	Work	Result	Ref.
American Comedy Awards	1988	Funniest Supporting Male	The Princess Bride	Nominated	
American Comedy Awards	1990	Funniest Actor	When Harry Met Sally...	Won	
American Comedy Awards	1990	Funniest Male in a TV Special	Midnight Train to Moscow	Nominated	
American Comedy Awards	1992	Funniest Actor	City Slickers	Won	
American Comedy Awards	1992	Funniest Male in a TV Special	63rd Academy Awards	Won	
American Comedy Awards	1993	American Comedy Awards	Creative Achievement Award	Won	
American Comedy Awards	1993	Funniest Male in a TV Special	64th Academy Awards	Won	
American Comedy Awards	1994	Funniest Male in a TV Special	65th Academy Awards	Won	
American Comedy Awards	1999	Funniest Male in a TV Special	70th Academy Awards	Won	
American Comedy Awards	2000	Funniest Male in a TV Special	Saturday Night Live 25th Anniversary Special	Nominated	
American Comedy Awards	2001	Funniest Male in a TV Special	72nd Academy Awards	Nominated	
Annie Award	2014	Voice Acting in a Feature Production	Monsters University	Nominated	
Blockbuster Entertainment Award	2000	Favorite Comedy Team	Analyze This (with Robert De Niro)	Won	
CableACE Awards	1984	Writing a Comedy or Music Program	Billy Crystal: A Comic's Line	Nominated	
CableACE Awards	1987	Comedy Special	Don't Get Me Started – The Billy Crystal Special	Nominated	
CableACE Awards	1987	Directing a Comedy Special	Don't Get Me Started – The Billy Crystal Special	Nominated	
CableACE Awards	1987	Writing a Comedy Special	Don't Get Me Started – The Billy Crystal Special	Won	
CableACE Awards	1987	Performance in a Comedy Special	Don't Get Me Started – The Billy Crystal Special	Nominated	
CableACE Awards	1988	Directing a Comedy Special	Don't Get Me Started – The Lost Minutes	Won	
CableACE Awards	1988	Writing a Comedy Special	Don't Get Me Started – The Lost Minutes	Nominated	
CableACE Awards	1988	Performance in a Comedy Special	Don't Get Me Started – The Lost Minutes	Nominated	
CableACE Awards	1989	Actor in a Comedy Series	An All-Star Toast to the Improv	Won	
CableACE Awards	1993	Comedy Series	Sessions	Nominated	
CableACE Awards	1993	Entertainment Host	Comic Relief V	Won	
CableACE Awards	1995	Entertainment Host	Comic Relief VI	Won	
Directors Guild of America Award	2002	Directing – Television Film	61*	Nominated	
Golden Apple Award	1989	Male Star of the Year	Himself	Won	
Hasty Pudding Awards	2000	Man of the Year	Himself	Won	
Kids' Choice Awards	2002	Voice From an Animated Movie	Monsters, Inc.	Nominated	
Kids' Choice Awards	2014	Voice from an Animated Movie	Monsters University	Nominated	
MTV Movie Award	1992	Best Comedic Performance	City Slickers	Won	
Television Critics Association	1990	Achievement in Movies, Miniseries, & Specials	62nd Academy Awards	Nominated	
Television Critics Association	1991	Achievement in Movies, Miniseries, & Specials	63rd Academy Awards	Nominated	
Television Critics Association	1992	Achievement in Movies, Miniseries, & Specials	64th Academy Awards	Won	
ShoWest Convention	1991	Comedy Star of the Decade	Himself	Won	
UK Film Festival	2019	Best Actor	Standing Up, Falling Down	Won	
US Comedy Arts Festival	2001	AFI Star Award	Himself	Won	
World Soundtrack Award	2002	Best Original Song	Monsters, Inc. for "If I Didn't Have You"	Won	

== Honorary awards ==
Organizations	Year	Award	Result	Ref.
Women in Film Crystal + Lucy Awards	1991	Norma Zarky Humanitarian award	Received	
Hollywood Walk of Fame	1991	Motion Picture Star	Received	
GLAAD	2005	Excellence in Media Award	Won	
Mark Twain Prize for American Humor	2007	Statue	Received	
Disney Legends	2013	Statue	Received	
Critics' Choice Awards	2021	Lifetime Achievement Award	Received	
Kennedy Center Honors	2023	Medal	Received	
