= Kent Beyda =

American film editor

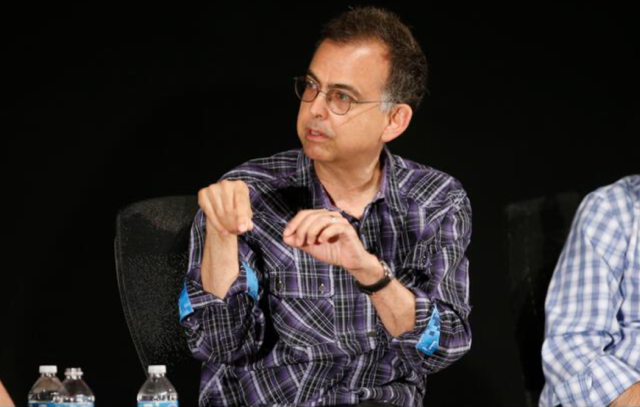
- Beyda in 2014
- Occupation: Film editor

Kent Beyda is an American film editor.

== Life and career ==
Beyda worked as an assistant editor on John Cassavetes' Opening Night (1977), Allan Arkush's Rock 'n' Roll High School (1979), and Joe Dante's The Howling (1981). He then moved into editing on the Julie Corman-produced Saturday the 14th (1981). On that film Beyda met his wife Nancy who was at that time working as Corman's assistant. He went on to do a series of music videos for Rod Stewart, Elvis Costello, Dokken, Bette Midler and Mick Jagger, Aldo Nova, Barbra Streisand, and Arkush's follow-up to Rock 'n' Roll High School called Get Crazy (1983). He then edited the mockumentary This Is Spinal Tap (1984).

Beyda's first film for a major studio was Fright Night (1985), a horror comedy for Columbia Pictures. Next he edited Out of Bounds (1986), directed by Richard Tuggle for Columbia. Beyda went on to edit Innerspace (1987) produced by Steven Spielberg and directed by Joe Dante, X: The Unheard Music (1986), a documentary about the Los Angeles punk group X, Alien Nation (1988), Fear (1990) starring Ally Sheedy, Spielberg and Dante's Gremlins 2: The New Batch (1990), True Identity (1991), Billy Crystal's directorial debut Mr. Saturday Night (1992), Spielberg and Brian Levant's The Flintstones (1994), Crystal's Forget Paris (1995), Jingle All the Way (1996) with Arnold Schwarzenegger, The Out-of-Towners (1999) with Steve Martin and Goldie Hawn, The Flintstones in Viva Rock Vegas (2000), Big Momma's House (2000), Scooby-Doo (2002), Scooby-Doo 2: Monsters Unleashed (2004), S. Darko (2009), Jonah Hex (2010), Yogi Bear (2010), and Parental Guidance (2012).

As a consultant, Beyda has participated in the films George of the Jungle (1997), Dude, Where's My Car? (2000), Robots (2005), Idiocracy (2006), Fantastic Four (2005), Horton Hears a Who! (2008), and Despicable Me (2010). He has worked on location in New York, Paris, San Francisco, Atlanta, Vancouver, Australia, and New Zealand. He is a member of American Cinema Editors and the Academy of Motion Picture Arts and Sciences.

In September 2009, Beyda took part in "Editing for Animation", the second part of the Academy's Perspectives in Editing series. The event featured a panel of five current leading animation editors, Beyda, John Carnochan, Kevin Nolting, Nancy Frazen, and Lois Freeman-Fox.

== Filmography ==
Year	Title
1981	Saturday the 14th
1983	Get Crazy
1984	This Is Spinal Tap
1985	Fright Night
1986	X: The Unheard Music
1986	Out of Bounds
1987	Innerspace
1988	Alien Nation
1990	Gremlins 2: The New Batch
1990	Fear
1991	True Identity
1992	Mr. Saturday Night
1994	The Flintstones
1995	Forget Paris
1996	Jingle All the Way
1999	The Out-of-Towners
2000	The Flintstones in Viva Rock Vegas
2000	Big Momma's House
2002	Scooby-Doo
2004	Scooby-Doo 2: Monsters Unleashed
2009	S. Darko
2010	Jonah Hex
2010	Yogi Bear
2012	Parental Guidance
2014	700 Sundays
2016	The Angry Birds Movie
2018	Dear Dictator
2019	The Angry Birds Movie 2
2021	Here Today
