= NOTW =

NOTW may refer to:

- News of the World (disambiguation)
- Not of this World (disambiguation)
- The Name of the Wind, a 2007 fantasy novel by Patrick Rothfuss
