= News of the World (disambiguation) =

News of the World was a British tabloid newspaper. It may also refer to:

== Arts and entertainment ==
- News of the World (album), an album by Queen, 1977
  - News of the World Tour, a tour by Queen
- News of the World (novel), a 2016 novel by Paulette Jiles
  - News of the World (film), a 2020 film based on the novel by Paulette Jiles
- "News of the World" (song), a song by The Jam, 1978
- "News of the World", a song by the Wildhearts from Earth vs the Wildhearts, 1993

== Sports ==
- News of the World Match Play, a golf tournament
- News of the World Snooker Tournament, a snooker tournament
- News of the World Darts Championship, a darts competition
- 1964 News of the World Trophy, a motor race

== See also ==
- World News (disambiguation)
