= Temple Emanu-El (Long Beach, New York) =

Reform synagogue in New York, US

Temple Emanu-El of Long Beach
- Location on Long Island, New York

Religion
- Affiliation: Reform Judaism
- Ecclesiastical or organizational status: Synagogue
- Leadership: Rabbi Jack Zanerhaft

Location
- Location: 455 Neptune Boulevard, Long Beach, Nassau County, New York
- Country: United States
- Interactive map of Temple Emanu-El of Long Beach
- Coordinates: 40°35′23″N 73°38′50″W

Architecture
- Established: (as a congregation)

Website
- templeemanuellongbeach.org

Temple Emanu-El of Long Beach is a Reform synagogue located at 455 Neptune Boulevard, in Long Beach, Nassau County, New York, in the United States.

== Notable members ==
- Billy Crystal, celebrated his Bar Mitzvah at the synagogue
