= Billy Crystal =

American comedian and actor (born 1948)

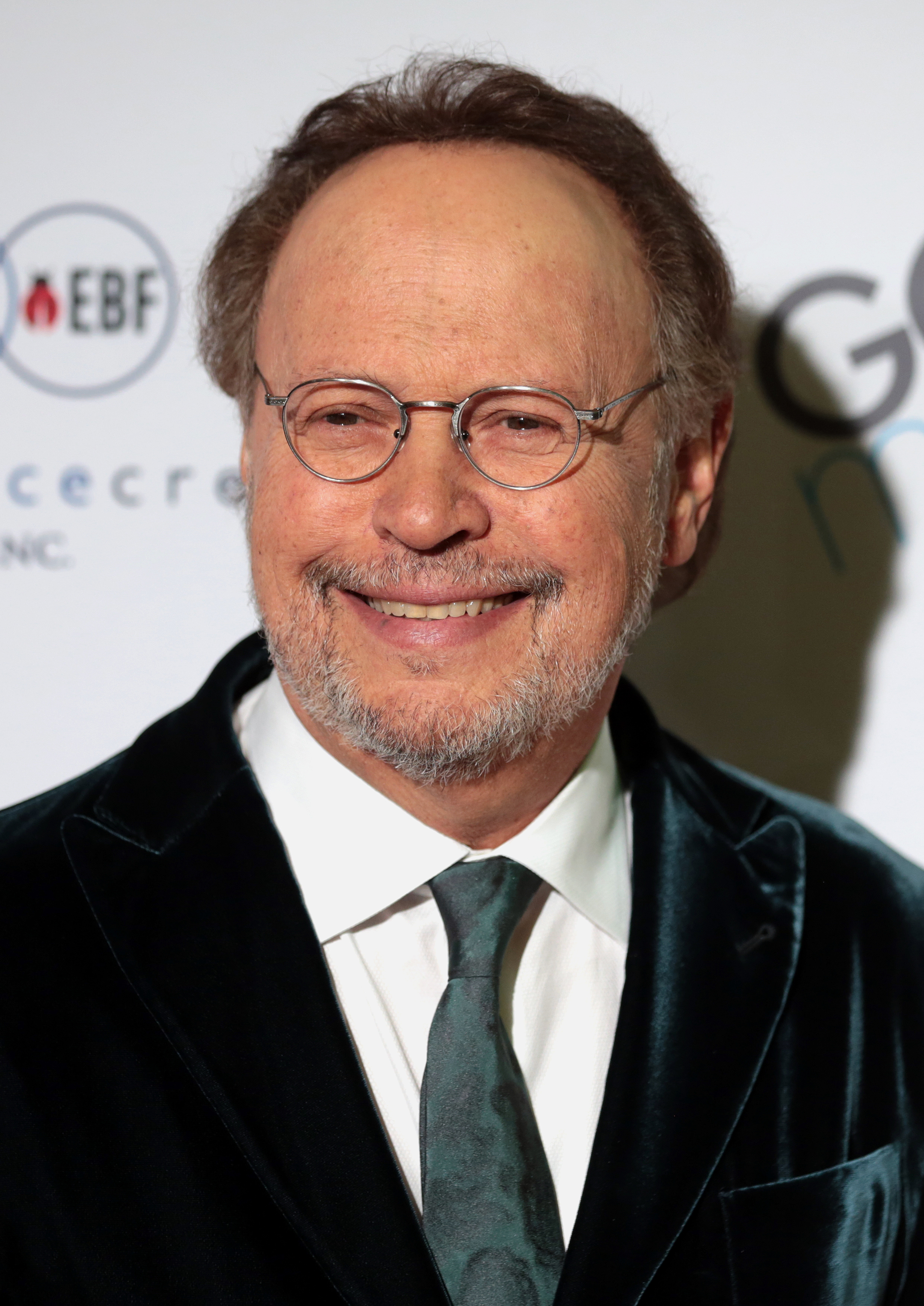
- Crystal in 2018
- Born: William Edward Crystal; March 14, 1948 (age 78); New York City, U.S.
- Education: New York University (BFA)
- Occupations: Comedian; actor; filmmaker
- Spouse: Janice Goldfinger (m. 1970)
- Children: 2, including Jennifer Crystal

Comedy career
- Years active: 1969–present
- Medium: Stand-up; film; television; theatre; books
- Genres: Observational comedy; musical comedy; sketch comedy; surreal humor; sarcasm; satire
- Subjects: American culture; American politics; current events; pop culture; everyday life; social awkwardness; human sexuality

William Edward Crystal (born March 14, 1948) is an American comedian, actor, and filmmaker. He is known as a stand-up comedian and for his film and stage roles. Crystal has received numerous accolades, including six Primetime Emmy Awards and a Tony Award as well as nominations for three Grammy Awards and three Golden Globe Awards. He was honored with a star on the Hollywood Walk of Fame in 1991, the Mark Twain Prize for American Humor in 2007, the Critics' Choice Lifetime Achievement Award in 2022, and the Kennedy Center Honors in 2023.

Crystal gained prominence for television roles as Jodie Dallas on the ABC sitcom Soap from 1977 to 1981 and as a cast member and frequent host of Saturday Night Live from 1984 to 1985. Crystal then became known for his roles in films such as Running Scared (1986), Throw Momma from the Train (1987), The Princess Bride (1987), When Harry Met Sally... (1989), City Slickers (1991), Forget Paris (1995), Father's Day (1997), Analyze This (1999), its sequel Analyze That (2002), and Parental Guidance (2012). Crystal is the voice of Mike Wazowski in Pixar's Monsters, Inc. franchise. He has hosted the Academy Awards nine times, beginning in 1990 and most recently in 2012.

Crystal made his Broadway debut in his one man show 700 Sundays in 2004, for which he won the Tony Award for Best Special Theatrical Event. Crystal returned to the show again in 2014 which was filmed by HBO and received a Primetime Emmy Award for Outstanding Variety Special nomination. He wrote and starred in the Broadway musical Mr. Saturday Night based on his film of the same name in 2022, for which he was Tony-nominated for Best Actor in a Musical and Best Book of a Musical. He has written five books including his memoir Still Foolin' 'Em (2013).

== Early life and education ==
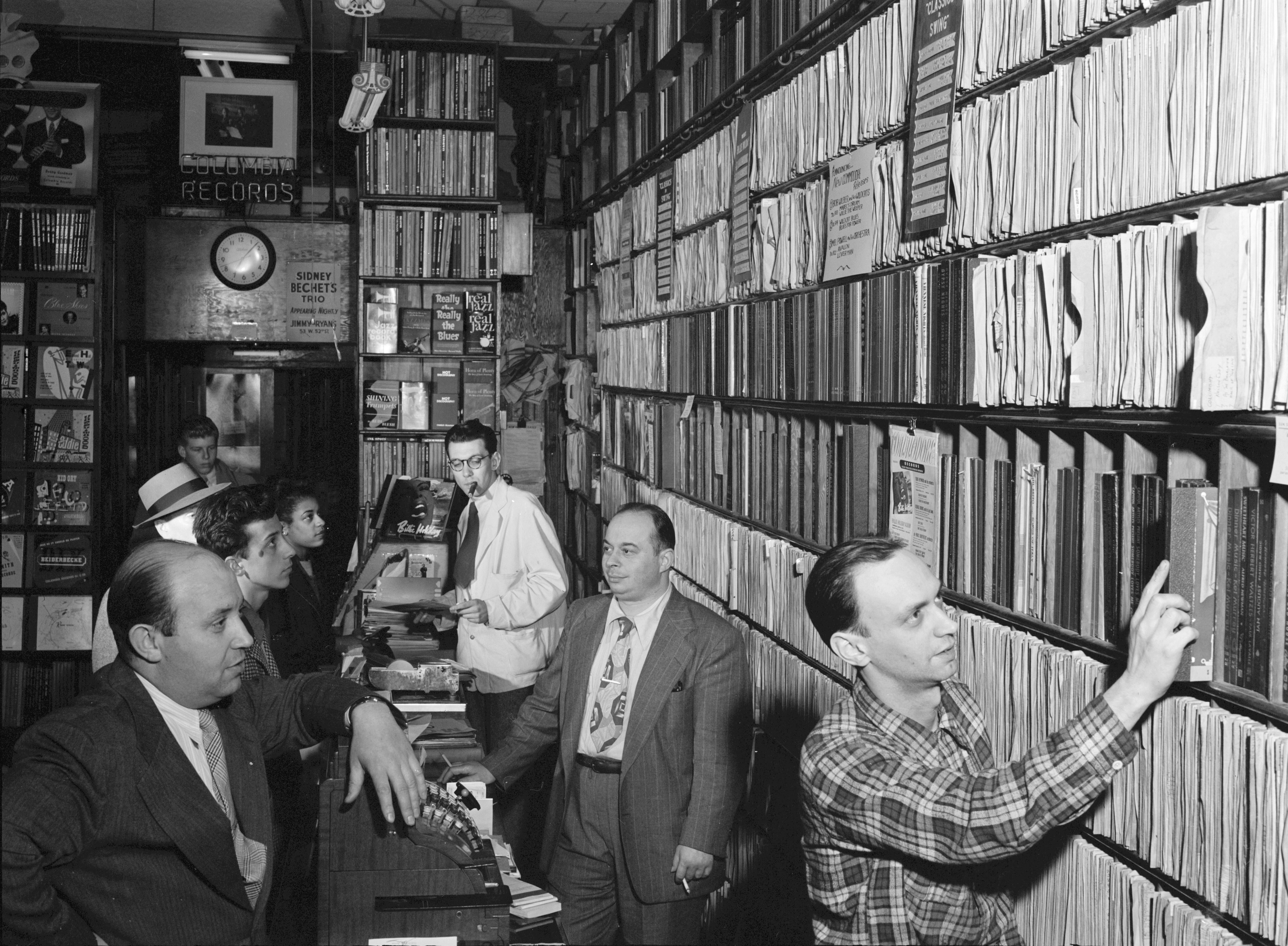
Jack Crystal (right) with Milt Gabler, Herbie Hill and Lou Blum at the Commodore Music Shop (1947)

William Edward Crystal was born at Doctors Hospital on the Upper East Side of Manhattan, and initially raised in the Bronx. As a toddler, he moved with his family to 549 East Park Avenue in Long Beach, New York, on Long Island. Crystal and his older brothers Joel, who later became an art teacher, and Richard, nicknamed Rip, were the sons of Helen (née Gabler), a housewife, and Jack Crystal, who owned and operated the Commodore Music Store, founded by Crystal's grandfather, Julius Gabler. Crystal's father was also a jazz promoter, a producer, and an executive for an affiliated jazz record label, Commodore Records, founded by Crystal's uncle, musician and songwriter Milt Gabler.

Crystal is Jewish (his ancestors emigrated from Austria, Russia, and Lithuania), and he grew up attending Temple Emanu-El in Long Beach, where he had his bar mitzvah. The three young brothers would entertain by reprising comedy routines from the likes of Bob Newhart, Rich Little and Sid Caesar records their father would bring home. Jazz artists such as Arvell Shaw, Pee Wee Russell, Eddie Condon, and Billie Holiday were often guests in the home. With the decline of Dixieland jazz and the rise of discount record stores, in 1963, Crystal's father lost his business and died later that year at the age of 54 after having a heart attack. His mother died in 2001.

After graduating from Long Beach High School in 1965, Crystal attended Marshall University in Huntington, West Virginia, on a baseball scholarship. Crystal never played baseball at Marshall because the program was suspended during his first year. Crystal did not return to Marshall as a sophomore, instead deciding to stay in New York to be close to his future wife. He studied acting at HB Studio. Crystal attended Nassau Community College with her and later transferred to New York University, where he was a film and television directing major. Crystal graduated from NYU in 1970 with a BFA from its then School of Fine Arts. One of his instructors was Martin Scorsese, while Oliver Stone and Christopher Guest were among his classmates.

== Career ==
=== 1969–1985: Stand-up, Soap, and SNL ===
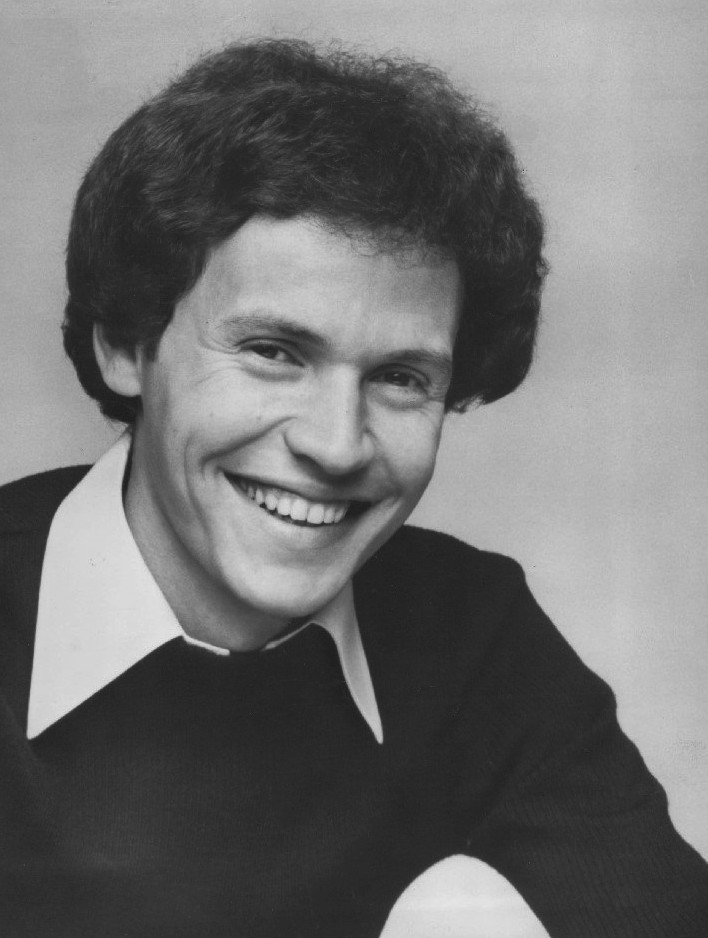
Crystal in 1977

In 1969, Crystal joined various improv troupes. He spent over four years in a comedy improv group with two friends. They played colleges and coffee houses and Crystal worked as a substitute teacher on Long Island. Crystal later became a solo act and performed regularly at The Improv and Catch a Rising Star. In 1976, he appeared on The Tonight Show Starring Johnny Carson and on an episode of All in the Family. Crystal was on the dais for the Dean Martin celebrity roast of Muhammad Ali in 1976, where he performed impressions of both Ali and sportscaster Howard Cosell. This began a lifelong friendship between Ali and Crystal.

Crystal was scheduled to appear on the first episode of NBC Saturday Night on October 11, 1975 (the show was renamed Saturday Night Live on March 26, 1977), but his sketch was cut. Crystal did perform on episode 17 of that first season, doing a monologue of an old jazz man capped by the line "Can you dig it? I knew that you could." Host Ron Nessen introduced him as "Bill Crystal." Crystal made a guest appearance on "The Love Boat" Season 2 Episode 5, which aired on October 20, 1978. He also made game show appearances such as The Hollywood Squares, All Star Secrets and The $20,000 Pyramid. To this day, Crystal holds the Pyramid franchise's record for getting his contestant partner to the top of the pyramid in the winner's circle in the fastest time: 26 seconds.

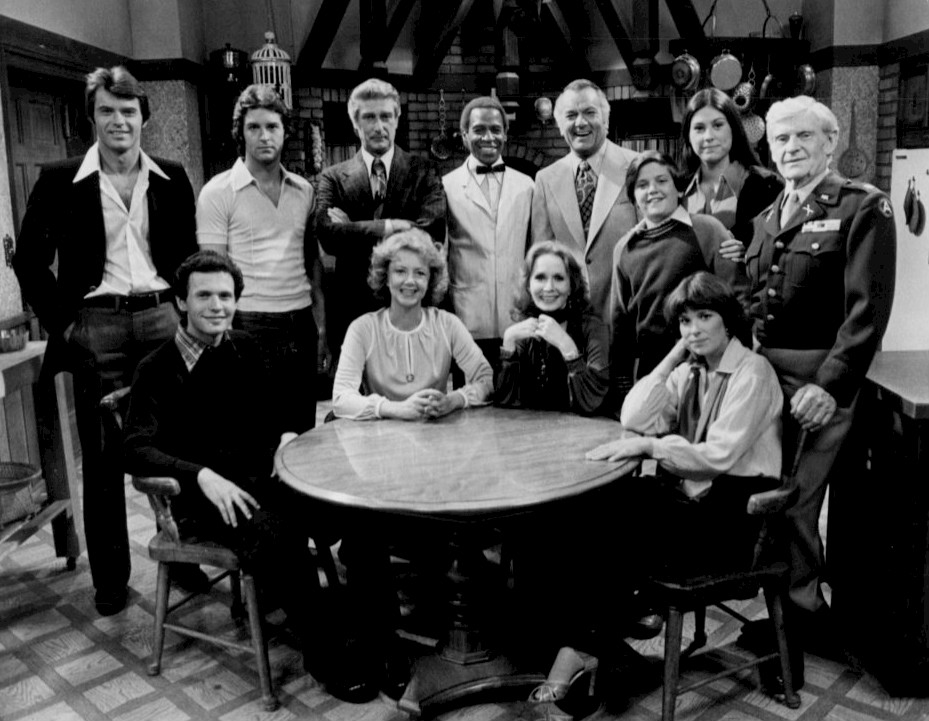
Cast of Soap (1977). Back row, L-R: Robert Urich, Ted Wass, Richard Mulligan, Robert Guillaume, Robert Mandan, Jimmy Baio, Diana Canova, Arthur Peterson Jr. Seated: Billy Crystal, Cathryn Damon, Katherine Helmond, Jennifer Salt.

Crystal's earliest prominent role was as Jodie Dallas on Soap, one of the first unambiguously gay characters in the cast of an American television series. He continued in the role during the series's entire 1977–1981 run.

In 1982, Crystal hosted his own variety show, The Billy Crystal Comedy Hour on NBC. When Crystal arrived to shoot the fifth episode, he learned it had been canceled after only the first two aired. After hosting Saturday Night Live twice, on March 17, 1984, and the show's ninth season finale on May 5, Crystal joined the regular cast for the 1984–85 season. His most famous recurring sketch was his parody of Fernando Lamas, a smarmy talk-show host whose catchphrase, "You look... mahvelous!", became a media sensation, including ads for Diet Pepsi. Also in the 1980s, Crystal starred in an episode of Shelley Duvall's Faerie Tale Theatre as the smartest of the three little pigs.

Crystal's first film role was in Joan Rivers's 1978 film Rabbit Test, the story of the "world's first pregnant man." Crystal appeared briefly in the Rob Reiner "rockumentary" This Is Spinal Tap (1984) as Morty The Mime, a waiter dressed as a mime at one of Spinal Tap's parties. He shared the scene with a then-unknown, non-speaking Dana Carvey, stating famously that "Mime is money."

=== 1986–1999: Oscar host and leading man status ===
Due to the success of Crystal's standup and SNL career, in 1985, he released an album of his stand-up material titled Mahvelous!. The title track You Look Marvelous, written by Crystal and Paul Shaffer, had an accompanying music video that debuted on MTV. Both the song and video features Crystal in character as his SNL persona of talk show host Fernando Lamas. The video features Lamas cruising around in what was at the time the world's longest stretch limousine, built by custom-coach designer and builder Vini Bergeman, surrounded by models in bikinis. The single peaked at No. 58 on the Billboard Hot 100 in the US and No. 17 in Canada. The album was nominated for a Grammy Award for Best Comedy Recording at the 1986 Grammy Awards. He later starred in the action comedy Running Scared (1986) opposite Gregory Hines. Film critic of the Chicago Sun-Times Roger Ebert praised the two for their on-screen chemistry writing, "But Crystal and Hines...don't need a plot because they have so much good dialogue and such a great screen relationship."

During this time, Crystal hosted the Academy Awards broadcast a total of nine times, from 1990, 1991, 1992, 1993, 1997, 1998, 2000, 2004 and 2012. His hosting was critically praised, resulting in two Primetime Emmy Award wins for hosting and writing the 63rd Academy Awards and an Emmy win for writing the 64th Academy Awards. San Francisco Chronicle columnist John Carman raved about Crystal's performance for the 70th Academy Awards writing, "It was the best Oscar show in two decades...Crystal was back in razor form." The Seattle Times television editor Kay McFadden praised Crystal commenting that "he possesses nearly impeccable timing and judgment."

Crystal reunited with director Rob Reiner in The Princess Bride (1987), in a comedic supporting role as "Miracle Max." Reiner got Crystal to accept the part by saying, "How would you like to play Mel Brooks?" Reiner also allowed Crystal to ad-lib, and his parting shot, "Have fun storming the castle!" is a frequently quoted line. Critic Roger Ebert described Crystal as a highlight of the film writing "the funniest sequences in the film stars Billy Crystal and Carol Kane, both unrecogizable behind makeup, as an ancient wizard and crone who specialize in bringing the dead back to life." Reiner directed Crystal for a third time in the romantic comedy When Harry Met Sally... (1989). Crystal starred alongside Meg Ryan, Bruno Kirby and Carrie Fisher in a script written by Nora Ephron. The Hollywood Reporter praised the film and Crystal's performance writing, "Crystal's lustrous, deeply-shaded performance is certain to win him legions of new fans; indeed, his prowess as a comic reaches its deepest human dimension here." Crystal was nominated for the Golden Globe Award for Best Actor – Motion Picture Musical or Comedy losing to Morgan Freeman in Driving Miss Daisy (1989). The film has since become an iconic classic for the genre and is Crystal's most celebrated film. In 2019, the BBC named the film the greatest romantic comedy of all time.

In 1991, Crystal created and produced the HBO six-part comedy miniseries Sessions starring Michael McKean and Elliott Gould. The Los Angeles Times praised the project describing it as "swankily written, elegantly staged and perfectly cast." Crystal then starred in the award-winning buddy comedy City Slickers (1991), which proved very successful both commercially and critically and for which Crystal was nominated for his second Golden Globe. The film was followed by a sequel, which was less successful. The name of his company is Face Productions. Entertainment Weekly praised Crystal's performance writing, "It's also the first movie ever to do the talented Billy Crystal justice...he's far more pleasureful to watch in this sort of dramatic-comedy role than, say, Robin Williams, because his comfy, urban-shlemiel personality helps ground the jokes." Following the significant success of these films, Crystal wrote, directed, and starred in Mr. Saturday Night (1992) and Forget Paris (1995). In the former, Crystal played a serious role in aging makeup, as an egotistical comedian who reflects back on his career.

In 1992, Crystal narrated Dr. Seuss Video Classics: Horton Hatches the Egg. He was originally asked to voice Buzz Lightyear in Toy Story (1995) but turned it down, a decision he later regretted due to the popularity of the series. Crystal later had supporting roles in Kenneth Branagh's William Shakespeare epic Hamlet (1996), and Woody Allen's critically acclaimed comedy ensemble film Deconstructing Harry (1997). Crystal starred opposite Robin Williams in Father's Day (1997) and both comedians had an unscripted cameo in the third season of Friends (1997). He also had success alongside Robert De Niro in Harold Ramis's mobster comedy Analyze This (1999). In 1996, Crystal was the guest star of the third episode of Muppets Tonight and hosted three Grammy Awards Telecasts: the 29th Grammys; the 30th Grammys; and the 31st Grammys. Crystal was a guest on the first and the last episode of The Tonight Show with Jay Leno, which concluded February 6, 2014, after 22 seasons on the air.

=== 2000–2014: Later film work and Broadway debut ===
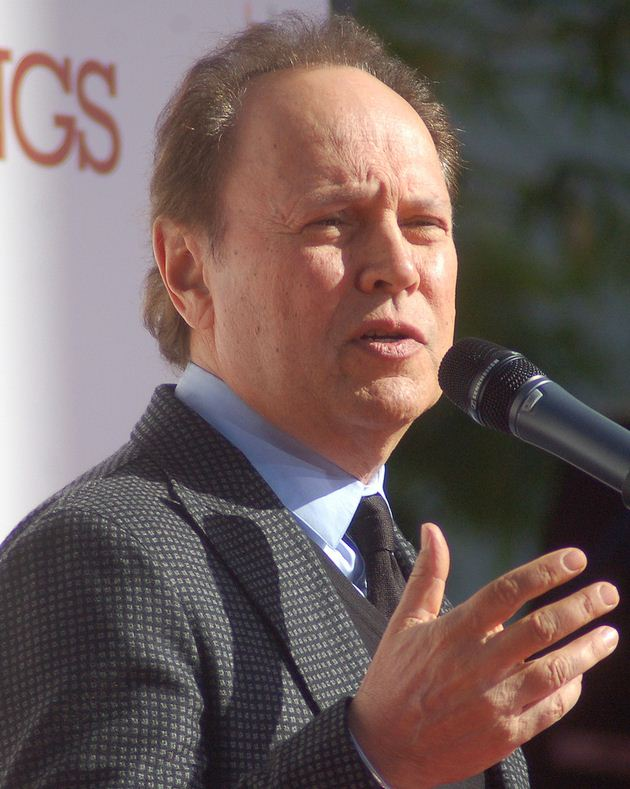
Crystal at the 2013 TCL Chinese Theatre

Crystal directed the made-for-television movie 61* (2001) based on Roger Maris's and Mickey Mantle's race to break Babe Ruth's single-season home run record in 1961. This earned Crystal an Primetime Emmy Award nomination for Outstanding Directing for a Miniseries, Movie or a Special. More recent performances include roles in America's Sweethearts (2001), the sequel Analyze That (2002), and Parental Guidance (2012). Crystal later went on to provide the voice of Mike Wazowski in the blockbuster Pixar film Monsters, Inc. (2001), Cars (2006), during the epilogue in the end credits as a car version of the character, and to reprise his voice role in the prequel film, Monsters University (2013) and the television series Monsters at Work (2021–2024). Crystal also provided the voice of Calcifer in the English version of Hayao Miyazaki's Howl's Moving Castle (2004). He won the 2005 Tony Award for Best Special Theatrical Event for 700 Sundays, a two-act, one-man play, which Crystal conceived and wrote about his parents and his childhood growing up on Long Island. Crystal toured throughout the US with the show in 2006 and then Australia in 2007. Following the initial success of the play, he wrote the book 700 Sundays for Warner Books, which was published on October 31, 2005. In conjunction with the book and the play that also paid tribute to his uncle Milt Gabler, Crystal produced two CD compilations: Billy Crystal Presents: The Milt Gabler Story, which featured his uncle's most influential recordings from Billie Holiday's "Strange Fruit" to "Rock Around the Clock" by Bill Haley & His Comets; and Billy Remembers Billie featuring Crystal's favorite Holiday recordings.

Crystal returned as the host for the 2012 Oscar ceremony, after Eddie Murphy resigned from hosting. His nine times is second only to Bob Hope's 19 in most ceremonies hosted. At the 83rd Academy Awards ceremony in 2011, Crystal appeared as a presenter for a digitally inserted Bob Hope and before doing so was given a standing ovation. The ceremony's hosts were James Franco and Anne Hathaway who received largely negative reviews, with film critic Roger Ebert writing that "when Crystal came onstage about two hours into the show, he got the first laughs of the broadcast". Crystal's hosting gigs have regularly included an introductory video segment in which he comedically inserts himself into scenes of that year's nominees in addition to a song following his opening monologue. In 2013, Crystal released his autobiographical memoir Still Foolin' Em. The audiobook version was nominated for a Grammy Award for Best Spoken Word Album at the 2014 Grammy Awards. In the fall of 2013, Crystal brought the show, 700 Sundays back to Broadway for a two-month run at the Imperial Theatre. HBO filmed the January 3–4, 2014 performances for a special, which debuted on their network on April 19, 2014, entitled Billy Crystal: 700 Sundays. The televised special received three Primetime Emmy Award nominations including Outstanding Variety Special, and Outstanding Writing for a Variety Special.

In 2014, Crystal paid tribute to his close friend Robin Williams at the 66th Primetime Emmy Awards. In his tribute, Crystal talked about their friendship, saying, "As genius as he was on stage, he was the greatest friend you could ever imagine. Supportive. Protective. Loving. It's very hard to talk about him in the past because he was so present in all of our lives. For almost 40 years, he was the brightest star in the comedy galaxy… [His] beautiful light will continue to shine on us forever. And the glow will be so bright, it'll warm your heart. It'll make your eyes glisten. And you'll think to yourselves: Robin Williams. What a concept." Crystal stated that paying tribute to Williams so publicly and so soon after Williams had died was one of "the hardest things I've had to do" and that "I was really worried that I wasn't going to get through it." Crystal soon after appeared on The View where he and Whoopi Goldberg shared stories about Williams, reminiscing about their friendship, and their collaborations together on Comic Relief.

=== 2015–present: Return to Broadway ===
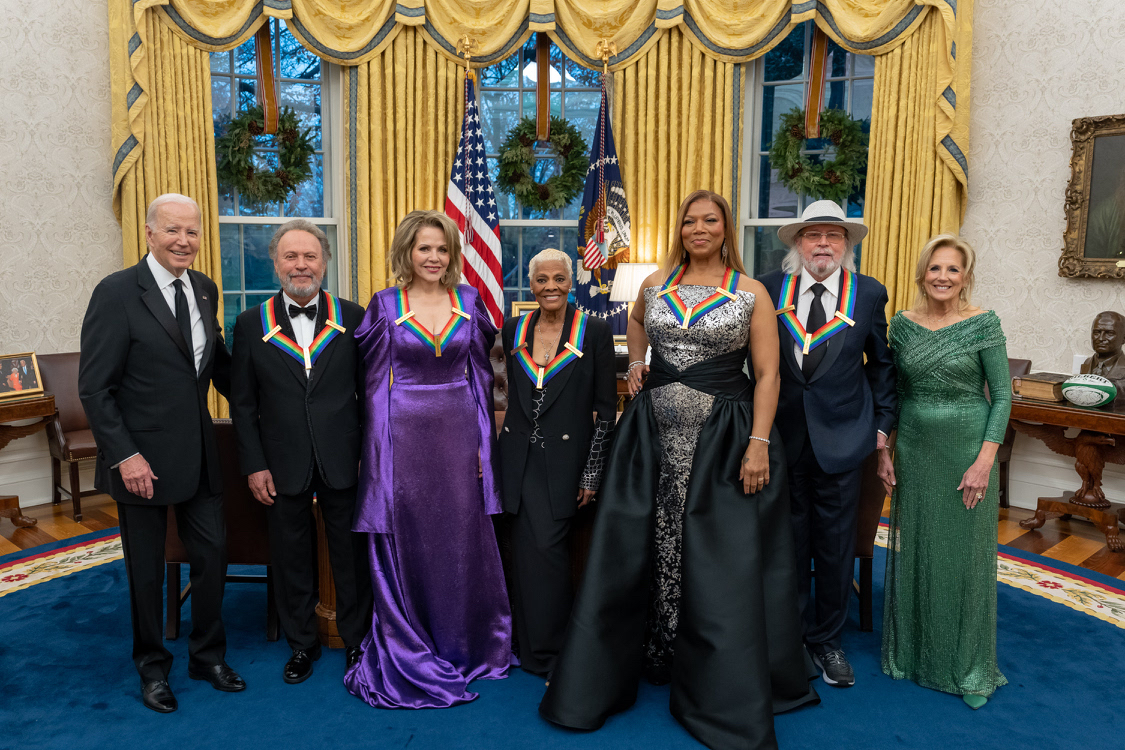
President Joe Biden, Crystal, Renée Fleming, Dionne Warrick, Queen Latifah, Barry Gibb, and Jill Biden in 2023

In 2015, Crystal co-starred alongside Josh Gad on the FX comedy series The Comedians, which ran for just one season before being canceled. His series received mixed reviews with many critics noting the chemistry developed further as the series went on. The series was compared to backstage shows such as The Larry Sanders Show and 30 Rock. Kate Kulzick of The A.V. Club wrote "The odd-couple pairing of Crystal and Gad works well, with their generational divide providing many of the show's early highlights...The friendly rapport that develops between the fictionalized Billy and Josh allows them to relax a bit and get to know each other better".

In 2016, Crystal gave one of the eulogies for Muhammad Ali at his funeral. In his remembrance of Ali, Crystal talked about his admiration for Ali as a boxer, and humanitarian. He also shared stories of their unlikely friendship after Crystal did a series of impersonations of him. Crystal stated of Ali's legacy, "Only once in a thousand years or so, do we get to hear a Mozart, or see a Picasso, or read a Shakespeare. Ali was one of them. And yet, at his heart, he was still a kid from Louisville who ran with the gods and walked with the crippled and smiled at the foolishness of it all."

In the fall of 2021, Crystal reprised the role of Buddy Young Jr., in a theatrical musical staging of Mr. Saturday Night at the Barrington Stage Company in Pittsfield, MA. In 2022, Crystal adapted his 1992 movie Mr. Saturday Night into a Broadway musical with the same name. Crystal stars in the musical reprising his role from the film alongside David Paymer. The production began previews on Broadway at the Nederlander Theatre on March 29, 2022, prior to officially opening on April 27. Crystal earned the Drama League Award for Contribution to the Theater Award for "his extraordinary work on stages across the country and commitment to mentorship in the field." Crystal performed a number with the ensemble from his musical at the 75th Tony Awards. Crystal also performed what he described as Yiddish scat singing. Crystal went into the crowd teaching Lin-Manuel Miranda and Samuel L. Jackson as well as the rest of the audience. The New York Times praised Crystal on his bit, describing it as a highlight of the telecast writing, "one of the few moments that broke through...is when [Crystal] brought it out into the audience, and threw it up to the balcony, he showed how precision, delivery and command of a room can make even the oldest, silliest material impossibly compelling."

In 2023, Crystal was celebrated by the Kennedy Center Honors. Tributes came from Rob Reiner, Meg Ryan, Whoopi Goldberg, Robert De Niro, Jay Leno, and Bob Costas. Lin-Manuel Miranda and Marc Shaiman did a tribute to Crystal's "Oscar Medleys" to the tunes of "Too Marvelous for Words", "It Had to Be You" (the theme from When Harry Met Sally...), and "My Favorite Things" from The Sound of Music. Crystal attended the 97th Academy Awards where he served as a presenter for Best Picture with his When Harry met Sally... co-star Meg Ryan.

He is set to return to Broadway in October 2026 in 860, an autobiographical one-man show about his experience losing his home in the 2025 Palisades fire. The production is set to be directed by Scott Ellis at the Imperial Theatre.

== Acting credits and accolades ==
Crystal has received numerous accolades including six Primetime Emmy Awards for Outstanding Individual Performance in a Variety or Music Program as the host of the 31st Annual Grammy Awards (1989), 63rd Academy Awards (1991), and 70th Academy Awards (1998) and the Outstanding Writing for a Variety Series for writing his comedy special Midnight Train to Moscow (1990), and the 63rd Academy Awards and 64th Academy Awards (1992). For his Broadway debut, his one man show 700 Sundays (2005), Crystal won the Tony Award for Best Special Theatrical Event, and the Drama Desk Award. He received further Tony nominations for Best Actor in a Musical and Best Book of a Musical for Mr. Saturday Night (2022).

Crystal received nominations for three Grammy Awards for Best Comedy Album for You Look Marvelous (1986), Best Spoken Word Album for Still Foolin' Em (2014), and Best Musical Theatre Album for Mr. Saturday Night (2023). He also received three Golden Globe Award nominations for Best Actor in a Motion Picture Musical or Comedy for his performances in the romantic comedy When Harry Met Sally... (1989), the western comedy City Slickers (1991), and Crystal's directorial debut Mr. Saturday Night (1992).

Crystal has also received numerous honors including a star on the Hollywood Walk of Fame in 1991, and was awarded with the Mark Twain Prize for American Humor in 2007 where he was honored by Robin Williams, Whoopi Goldberg, Robert De Niro, Martin Short, and Rob Reiner at the John F. Kennedy Center for the Performing Arts in Washington, D.C. Crystal was made one of the Disney Legends in 2013 and also received the Critics' Choice Lifetime Achievement Award in 2022 and the Kennedy Center Honors in 2023.

== Discography ==
=== Albums ===
- Mahvelous!, (A&M Records, 1985) [#65 US]

=== Singles ===
- "You Look Marvelous", (A&M Records, 1985) [#58 US]
- "I Hate When That Happens", (A&M Records, 1985)
- "The Christmas Song", (A&M Records, 1985)

== Published works ==
- Crystal, Billy (1986). Absolutely Mahvelous. New York: Perigee Trade. ISBN 0-399-51246-2.
- Crystal, Billy (2004). I Already Know I Love You. New York: HarperCollins. ISBN 0-06-059391-1.
- Crystal, Billy (2005). 700 Sundays. New York: Warner Books. ISBN 0-446-57867-3.
- Crystal, Billy (2006). Grandpa's Little One. New York: HarperCollins. ISBN 978-0-06-078173-6.
- Crystal, Billy (2013). Still Foolin' 'Em: Where I've Been, Where I'm Going, and Where the Hell Are My Keys?. New York: Henry Holt and Co. ISBN 978-0-8050-9820-4.

== Personal life ==
On June 4, 1970, Crystal married his high school sweetheart, Janice Goldfinger. Crystal has long credited his parents, "who always looked like they loved being together", with setting an example for his own marriage. They have two daughters: actress Jennifer and Lindsay, a producer, and are grandparents. They lived in the Pacific Palisades neighborhood of Los Angeles, California. In January 2025, their home was destroyed in the Palisades Fire.

Crystal received an honorary Doctor of Fine Arts degree from New York University in 2016 and spoke at the commencement at Yankee Stadium.

=== Philanthropy ===
In 1986, Crystal started hosting Comic Relief on HBO with Robin Williams and Whoopi Goldberg. Founded by Bob Zmuda, Comic Relief raises money for homeless people in the United States.

On September 6, 2005, on The Tonight Show with Jay Leno, Crystal and Jay Leno were the first celebrities to sign a Harley-Davidson motorcycle to be auctioned off for Gulf Coast relief.

Crystal has participated in the Simon Wiesenthal Center Museum of Tolerance in Los Angeles. His personal history is featured in the "Finding Our Families, Finding Ourselves" exhibit in the genealogy wing of the museum.

=== Political views ===
Crystal is a supporter of the Democratic Party and has appeared in advertisements on behalf of the party.

Crystal was an outspoken critic of Donald Trump during the latter's 2016 presidential campaign. Crystal supported Hillary Clinton in the 2016 election.

=== Sports ===
On March 12, 2008, Crystal signed a one-day minor league contract to play with the New York Yankees, and he was invited to the team's major league spring training. Crystal wore uniform number 60 in honor of his upcoming 60th birthday. On March 13, in a spring training game against the Pittsburgh Pirates, Crystal led off as the designated hitter. He managed to make contact, fouling a fastball up the first base line, but was eventually struck out by Pirates pitcher Paul Maholm on six pitches and was later replaced in the batting order by Johnny Damon. Crystal was released on March 14, his 60th birthday.

Crystal's boyhood idol was Yankee Hall of Fame legend Mickey Mantle, who had signed a program for him when Crystal attended a game where Mantle had hit a home run. Years later on The Dinah Shore Show, in one of his first television appearances, Crystal met Mantle in person and had Mantle re-sign the same program. Crystal would be good friends with Mantle until Mantle's death in 1995. He and Bob Costas together wrote the eulogy Costas read at Mantle's funeral, and George Steinbrenner then invited Crystal to emcee the unveiling of Mantle's monument at Yankee Stadium. In his 2013 memoir Still Foolin' 'Em, Crystal said that after the ceremony, near the Yankees clubhouse, he was punched in the stomach by Joe DiMaggio, who was angry at Crystal for not having introduced him to the crowd as the "Greatest living player."

Crystal also was well known for his impressions of Yankees Hall of Famer turned broadcaster Phil Rizzuto. Rizzuto, known for his quirks calling games, did not travel to Anaheim, California, in 1996 to call the game for WPIX. Instead, Crystal joined the broadcasters in the booth and pretended to be Rizzuto for a few minutes during the August 31 game.

In City Slickers, Crystal wore a New York Mets baseball cap. In the 1986 film Running Scared, his character is an avid Chicago Cubs fan, wearing a Cubs jersey in several scenes. In the 2012 film Parental Guidance, Crystal's character is the announcer for the Fresno Grizzlies, a Minor League Baseball team, who aspires to announce for their Major League affiliate, the San Francisco Giants.

Crystal appeared in Ken Burns's 1994 documentary Baseball, telling personal stories about his life-long love of baseball, including meeting Casey Stengel as a child and Ted Williams as an adult.

Crystal is also a longtime Los Angeles Clippers fan and season ticket holder.
