= Not of this World =

Not of this World may refer to:

- Not of this World (film), a 1999 Italian film
- Not of this World (Petra album), 1983
- Not of This World (Dash Rip Rock album), 1990
- Not of This World, a 2001 album by Pendragon
- "Not of This World", a song by Danzig, from the 1988 album Danzig

== See also ==
- NOTW (disambiguation)
