= Parental Guidance (film) =

2012 film by Andy Fickman

- Theatrical release poster
- Directed by: Andy Fickman
- Written by: Lisa Addario; Joe Syracuse
- Produced by: Billy Crystal; Peter Chernin; Dylan Clark
- Starring: Billy Crystal; Bette Midler; Marisa Tomei; Tom Everett Scott; Bailee Madison
- Cinematography: Dean Semler
- Edited by: Kent Beyda
- Music by: Marc Shaiman
- Production companies: Walden Media; Chernin Entertainment; Face Productions; Dune Entertainment
- Distributed by: 20th Century Fox
- Release date: December 25, 2012
- Running time: 105 minutes
- Country: United States
- Language: English
- Budget: $25 million
- Box office: $119.8 million

Parental Guidance is a 2012 American family comedy film directed by Andy Fickman and written by Lisa Addario and Joe Syracuse. It stars Billy Crystal, Bette Midler, Marisa Tomei, and Tom Everett Scott, and follows a couple who are asked to look after their grandchildren by their skeptical daughter, while she and her husband are out of town.

This was the final 20th Century Fox film to be financed by Dune Entertainment as part of a deal with the studio; shortly after, the company merged with RatPac Entertainment and struck a financing deal with Warner Bros. It was theatrically released on December 25, 2012, to negative reviews from critics but was a commercial success, grossing $119.8 million from a $25 million budget.

== Plot ==
Artie Decker is fired from his job as a sports commentator for the minor league Fresno Grizzlies, due to his old-fashioned personality and lack of social media savvy. His daughter, web developer Alice, calls him and his wife Diane, asking them to come to Atlanta to babysit her children while she and her husband Phil attend an entrepreneur convention in South Carolina. Artie and Diane conflict with Phil and Alice's helicopter parenting and learn of their grandchildren's various problems - the eldest daughter Harper is an overachiever, the middle son Turner has a stutter, and the youngest son Barker has an imaginary friend, Carl the Kangaroo.

The grandparents attempt to bond with the children at a Chinese restaurant, but Artie accidentally upsets Barker, ending the night in chaos. The next morning, Alice finds herself unable to part with her children, so Phil attends the convention in her stead while their boss gives her an assignment to redesign the website for the X Games. Artie uses this to arrange an interview for the role of sports commentator. In an attempt to win over his grandchildren, he breaks several of the rules Alice has set for them, letting them watch horror movies and eat sweets, to Alice's chagrin. Despite this, she agrees to join Phil in South Carolina after Diane tells her that she and Artie will never be good grandparents if she never gives them a chance.

At Harper's violin practice, her tutor Dr. Schveer berates her, leading Diane to threaten Schveer. Artie allows Barker to skip a playdate in order to take him to the skate park where his interview is being held. However, Barker escapes from his supervision, nearly getting run over by Tony Hawk while Hawk is skateboarding, and the incident is broadcast on the news. He returns to learn that Turner got into a fight with his bully at school after Artie had tried to teach him a lesson about confidence. Artie shows Turner the Shot Heard 'Round the World event during a discussion. Meanwhile, Phil and Alice witness the news broadcast of the skate park incident and return home. The tension comes to a head when Alice discovers Diane has allowed Harper to attend a party the night before a violin recital and Barker claims Carl has been hit and killed by a car.

Alice eventually reconciles with Artie and Diane, and, sensing that Harper has lost her passion for music, allows her to withdraw from the recital. Turner takes her place on stage and overcomes his stutter by reciting the commentary from Shot Heard 'Round the World. Afterward, Artie and Diane successfully reconnect with their grandchildren, and Artie takes up a new job as a commentator for an Atlanta Little League Baseball team alongside Turner.

== Cast ==
- Billy Crystal as Artie Decker
- Bette Midler as Diane Decker, Artie's wife
- Marisa Tomei as Alice Decker-Simmons, Artie & Diane's daughter
- Tom Everett Scott as Phil Simmons, Alice's husband and Artie & Diane's son-in-law
- Bailee Madison as Harper Simmons, Alice & Phil's daughter and Artie & Diane's granddaughter
- Joshua Rush as Turner Simmons, Alice & Phil's first son and Artie & Diane's grandson
- Kyle Harrison Breitkopf as Barker Simmons, Alice & Phil's second son and Artie & Diane's grandson
- Jennifer Crystal Foley as Cassandra
- Rhoda Griffis as Dr. Schveer
- Gedde Watanabe as Mr. Cheng
- Tony Hawk as himself
- Steve Levy as himself
- Linda Cohn as herself

== Release ==
The film was released Christmas Day 2012, in the United States and Canada and on Boxing Day 2012, in Australia, the United Kingdom, and Ireland. Its international release spans from December 19, 2012, to July 11, 2013, with the first 2013 release on January 3, 2013, in the Dominican Republic, Venezuela, and Singapore.

=== Home media ===
The film was released on DVD and Blu-ray on March 26, 2013, from 20th Century Fox Home Entertainment.

== Reception ==
=== Box office ===
The film grossed $77.3 million in the United States and Canada, and $42.5 million in other territories, for a worldwide total of $119.8 million.

Despite receiving negative reviews from critics, the film performed better than expected at the box office. In its opening weekend the film made $14.55 million from 3,367 theaters (a six-day total of $29.3 million), finishing in fourth behind holdover The Hobbit: An Unexpected Journey and fellow new releases Django Unchained and Les Misérables.

=== Critical response ===
On the review aggregator website Rotten Tomatoes, 18% of 89 critics' reviews are positive, with an average rating of 4/10. The website's consensus reads: "Parental Guidance is sweet but milquetoast, an inoffensive trifle that's blandly predictable." Metacritic, which uses a weighted average, assigned the film a score of 36 out of 100, based on 20 critics, indicating "generally unfavorable" reviews. Audiences surveyed by CinemaScore gave the film an average grade of "A–" on an A+ to F scale.

=== Accolades ===
Award	Category	Recipient(s)	Result
2013 Young Artist Awards	Best Performance in a Feature Film - Supporting Young Actor Ten and Under	Kyle Harrison Breitkopf	Nominated
2013 Young Artist Awards	Best Performance in a Feature Film - Supporting Young Actor Ten and Under	Joshua Rush	Nominated
2013 Young Artist Awards	Best Performance in a Feature Film - Young Ensemble Cast	Kyle Harrison Breitkopf, Bailee Madison, Joshua Rush	Nominated
