= World News =

World News may refer to one of the following sources that covers international news:

- ABC World News Tonight, a television news program that airs on American television network ABC
- BBC World News, the former name of international news and current affairs television channel BBC News (international TV channel)
- CNN World News, a television news program that airs on CNN International
- ITN World News, a television news program that originated in the United Kingdom, and aired during the late-eighties and most of the nineties
- Roanoke World-News, a former newspaper in the U.S. state of Virginia
- SBS World News, a television news program that airs on the Australian network SBS
  - SBS World News Channel, a defunct Australian television channel
- Sky World News, a television news program that airs on Sky News
- World News by Don Lee Broadcasting, on W6XAO (now KCBS-TV; 1938–1948)
- World News Now, an overnight news program that airs on American television network ABC
- World News Network, an internet news aggregation service
- World News Connection, a defunct American compilation of current international news translated into English
- World Magazine
- The World In News, an Indonesian world news program

== See also ==
- World news
- Worldwide Television News, part of Associated Press Television News
