= Forget Paris =

1995 film by Billy Crystall

- Theatrical release poster
- Directed by: Billy Crystal
- Written by: Billy Crystal; Lowell Ganz; Babaloo Mandel
- Produced by: Billy Crystal
- Starring: Billy Crystal; Debra Winger; Joe Mantegna; Julie Kavner; Richard Masur; Cathy Moriarty
- Cinematography: Don Burgess
- Edited by: Kent Beyda
- Music by: Marc Shaiman
- Production companies: Columbia Pictures; Castle Rock Entertainment
- Distributed by: Sony Pictures Releasing
- Release date: May 19, 1995
- Running time: 101 minutes
- Country: United States
- Language: English
- Budget: $21 million
- Box office: $56 million

Forget Paris is a 1995 American romantic comedy film produced, co-written, and directed by Billy Crystal. The film stars Crystal as an NBA referee and Debra Winger as an American airline executive based in Paris who meet under unusual circumstances and fall in love, though their relationship faces several setbacks.

It also stars Joe Mantegna, Julie Kavner, Richard Masur, and Cathy Moriarty. A number of professional basketball players, present and past, appear as themselves.

== Plot ==
At a restaurant in New York City, Andy prepares to introduce his friends to his fiancée, Liz. As the couple waits for the rest of the party to arrive, he tells her the story of how his friends Mickey and Ellen came to fall in love. As each of Andy's friends arrive, more of the story is unfolded.

Mickey Gordon is a National Basketball Association (NBA) referee who honors his recently deceased father's wishes by burying him with his World War II Army platoon in France, of which he was the sole survivor. The plans are delayed when the airline misplaces the casket.

Ellen Andrews, an airline executive from Wichita working in Paris, assists Mickey in locating and retrieving the casket. She surprises him by attending the burial so he will not be alone. Mickey rides back to Paris with Ellen, and they get to know each other along the way. He decides to delay his return trip to the United States to spend time with Ellen. They fall in love, but Mickey is forced to return for the beginning of the NBA season.

Mickey's loneliness leads him to lose his temper during a nationally televised game. Suspended by the NBA for a week, he returns to Paris to see Ellen. He learns Ellen is married but separated, and is unsure if she and her husband will get back together. While Mickey is in Charlotte refereeing a game, Ellen arrives, revealing that she has obtained a divorce. Having quit her job in France, she marries him. After a honeymoon period spent on the road during the NBA season, the couple settles in the San Fernando Valley outside Mickey's hometown of Los Angeles.

When the next basketball season begins, Ellen takes an entry-level customer service job with American Airlines, while Mickey travels with the NBA. Hating her new job and only seeing him a few days each month, Ellen becomes lonely and depressed. She asks Mickey to quit his job; he compromises by taking a one-year leave of absence and briefly working as a car salesman. Ellen gets promoted, climbing the corporate ladder, leaving Mickey at home to tend to her rather senile father, Arthur.

Mickey, unhappy at home with Arthur, decides to return early to the NBA. He comes home from a road trip to find Ellen gone. Before he can read her note, she arrives and explains that she had simply returned to Kansas to deliver Arthur to her siblings so they can be alone to repair their marriage.

Ellen tells Mickey she has been offered a transfer to Dallas. He refuses to move away from California, so she takes the airline's other offer of a transfer to Paris. Now separated, they are seemingly content in their original arrangements: Mickey traveling with the NBA, and Ellen working for an airline in Paris. It is obvious to everyone that they miss each other.

At the restaurant, Andy's friends have caught Liz up to date with the latest development coming four months prior. A basketball fan enters the restaurant and informs the group of an odd occurrence during the traditional singing of "The Star-Spangled Banner" prior to that night's New York Knicks game at Madison Square Garden. Mickey decides to abandon his job and immediately return to Paris to find Ellen.

Before Mickey can cross the basketball court, he spots Ellen in the arena. They meet and reconcile at mid-court, and as the arena lights come on after the anthem, the entire crowd sees them kiss.

Mickey and Ellen arrive at the restaurant together and re-tell Liz the story of their relationship.

== Cast ==
- Billy Crystal as Mickey Gordon
- Debra Winger as Ellen Andrews Gordon
- Joe Mantegna as Andy
- Cynthia Stevenson as Liz
- Richard Masur as Craig
- Julie Kavner as Lucy
- William Hickey as Arthur Andrews
- Robert Costanzo as waiter
- John Spencer as Jack Garrett
- Tom Wright as Tommy
- Cathy Moriarty as Lois Garrett
- Johnny Williams as Lou
- Clint Howard as exterminator
- Dan Castellaneta as man test-driving the Subaru car (uncredited)

=== As themselves ===
- Marv Albert
- Bill Walton
- Charles Barkley
- David Robinson
- Dan Majerle
- Kevin Johnson
- Paul Westphal
- Sean Elliott
- Patrick Ewing
- Tim Hardaway
- Kareem Abdul-Jabbar
- Bill Laimbeer
- Reggie Miller
- Chris Mullin
- Charles Oakley
- Kurt Rambis
- John Starks
- Isiah Thomas
- Spud Webb
- Marques Johnson
- Rush Limbaugh
- David Sanborn

=== NBA cameos ===
During scenes in which Mickey is working as a referee, several professional basketball players play themselves.

David Robinson and the San Antonio Spurs play Charles Barkley, Dan Majerle and the Phoenix Suns in a crucial game of the Western Conference Finals. Also in this scene is Kevin Johnson and the Suns coach at the time, Paul Westphal.

Mickey also officiates a Los Angeles Lakers–Detroit Pistons game during Kareem Abdul-Jabbar's final season. Having a "bad day", Mickey throws Kareem out of the game for no apparent reason, then does the same to Detroit Pistons stars Isiah Thomas and Bill Laimbeer, then eventually the entire roster of both teams.

Also seen are Reggie Miller, Tim Hardaway, Patrick Ewing, John Starks, Chris Mullin, Spud Webb (to whom Mickey says, "You're the only one I can talk to,"—both Webb and Billy Crystal are 5'7" tall), Kurt Rambis, Charles Oakley, Horace Grant, Dennis Rodman, Sean Elliott, Marques Johnson and, while Mickey was watching a game at home on his couch, Michael Jordan on television.

NBA broadcasters Marv Albert and Bill Walton also appear.

== Reception ==
=== Box office ===
Forget Paris grossed $33.2 million in the United States and Canada and $56 million worldwide.

=== Critical response ===
On the review aggregator website Rotten Tomatoes, the film holds an approval rating of 53% based on 30 reviews, with an average rating of 5.7/10. The website's critics consensus reads: "In addition to its titular exhortation, Forget Paris also forgets to offer rom-com fans enough romance or comedy to fill a feature worth remembering." Audiences surveyed by CinemaScore gave the film an average grade of B on a scale of A to F.

Roger Ebert of the Chicago Sun-Times gave it 3.5/4, and wrote: "By all rights, the movie should be a pale imitation of its betters, but sometimes lightning does strike twice, and this is a wonderful film, filled with romantic moments that ring true, and with great big laughs."

Kim Newman of Empire gave it three out of five, and wrote: "Towards the end you wish they'd just get it over with, but this film usually overcomes even the most cynical viewer's resistance."

Owen Gleiberman of Entertainment Weekly gave it a grade C− and called it "a romantic comedy made up entirely of yuppie signifiers". Gleiberman continued: "Forget Paris bounces along with bright, cheery proficiency, and there are a few laughs in it, but it’s the kind of skin-crawling comedy in which cliches are used to convey "meaningful" experience."

== See also ==
- List of basketball films
