= Mr. Saturday Night (musical) =

2022 stage musical

- Broadway promotional poster
- Music: Jason Robert Brown
- Lyrics: Amanda Green
- Book: Billy Crystal; Lowell Ganz; Babaloo Mandel
- Basis: Mr. Saturday Night by Billy Crystal
- Premiere: October 16, 2021: Barrington Stage Company
- Productions: 2021 Barrington Stage; 2022 Broadway

Mr. Saturday Night is a musical with music by Jason Robert Brown, lyrics by Amanda Green, and a book by Billy Crystal, Lowell Ganz, and Babaloo Mandel, based on the 1992 film. The musical follows comedian Buddy Young, Jr, decades past his prime, as he attempts a second chance at fame and his family. It premiered at Barrington Stage Company in October 2021. The musical moved to Broadway opening on April 27, 2022, at the Nederlander Theatre.

The Broadway production received positive reviews by critics, praising the book and music of the musical, being nominated for five Tony Awards, including for Best Musical. The performances of Billy Crystal and Shoshana Bean were positively reviewed, and the two were nominated for Tony Awards. The show's cast recording received a nomination for a Grammy Award for Best Musical Theater Album.

== Production history ==
The musical had its world premiere at Barrington Stage Company on October 22, 2021, for a limited run until October 30.

The production began previews on Broadway at the Nederlander Theatre on March 29, 2022, prior to officially opening on April 27. On July 17, 2022, the production announced its closing for September 4, 2022, after 28 previews and 116 performances.

== Musical numbers ==
=== Barrington Stage (2021) ===
==== Act I ====
- "Mr. Saturday Night" – Buddy's Singers
- "A Little Joy" – Buddy
- "The Living Room" – Abie & Stan
- "There’s a Chance" – Susan
- "That Guy" – Buddy
- "At Farber’s" – Farber & Ensemble
- "Until Now" – Buddy, Elaine & Stan
- "Timing" – Buddy, Howie, Will & Ronnie
- "What If I Said?" – Annie
- "Unbelievable" – Full Company

==== Act II ====
- "Maybe It Starts With Me" – Susan
- "Tahiti" – Elaine
- "My Wonderful Pain" – Elaine & Buddy
- "Broken" – Stan
- "Any Man But Me" – Buddy
- "Stick Around" – Susan, Elaine, Buddy, Annie & Company

=== Broadway (2022) ===
==== Act I ====
- "We're Live" – Bobby, Joey, & Lorraine
- "A Little Joy" – Buddy
- "There's a Chance" – Susan
- "I Still Got It" – Buddy & Stan
- "At Farber's" – Farber, Ramon, & Rebekah
- "Buddy's First Act" – Buddy, Elaine, & Stan
- "Until Now" – Buddy, Elaine, & Stan
- "Timing" – Buddy, Bobby, Joey, & Lorraine
- "What If I Said?" – Annie
- "Unbelievable" – Full Company

==== Act II ====
- "What's Playin' at the Movies" – Bobby, Joey, & Lorraine
- "Maybe It Starts With Me" – Susan
- "Tahiti" – Elaine
- "My Wonderful Pain" – Elaine & Buddy
- "Broken" – Stan
- "Any Man But Me" – Buddy
- "Stick Around" – Susan, Elaine, Buddy, Annie, & Company

== Cast and characters ==
Character	Barrington Stage	Broadway
Character	2021	2022
Buddy Young, Jr.	Billy Crystal	Billy Crystal
Elaine Young	Randy Graff	Randy Graff
Stan Yankelman	David Paymer	David Paymer
Susan Young	Alysha Umphress	Shoshana Bean
Annie Wells	Chasten Harmon	Chasten Harmon
Joey/Farber/Dr. Jeff/Elderly Actor & Others	Jordan Gelber	Jordan Gelber
Bobby/Mr. Jacovitti/Ramon/Larry Myereson & Others	Brian Gonzales	Brian Gonzales
Lorraine/NBC Page/Lucille/Karen & Others	Mylinda Hull	Mylinda Hull

== Reception ==
The play officially opened on April 27, 2022 with many in the industry attending opening night including Steve Martin, Martin Short, Tina Fey, Jimmy Fallon, Bryan Cranston, and Alex Borstein.

The show was met with positive reviews from critics particularly for Crystal's lively performance. The New York Times praised Crystal's performance, writing, "Crystal is utterly in his element performing live...It's a pleasure to watch." Critic Adam Feldman of Time Out wrote, "By Broadway standards, Mr. Saturday is a modest little show... But it delivers exactly what it promises: Crystal, completely in his element, with a crowd that is more than happy to buy what he’s selling". Variety called it "the funniest show on Broadway in years, if not the most likable." Peter Marks of The Washington Post described the show as "a slender but agreeable Broadway musical" in which the jokes "are old-school funny, polished and impeccably timed".

== Awards and nominations ==
Year	Award	Category	Nominee(s)	Result
2022	Drama Desk Awards			
2022	Drama Desk Awards	Outstanding Actor in a Musical	Billy Crystal	Nominated
2022	Drama Desk Awards	Outstanding Book of a Musical	Billy Crystal, Lowell Ganz, and Babaloo Mandel	Nominated
2022	Drama Desk Awards	Outstanding Lyrics	Amanda Green	Nominated
2022	Drama League Award	Outstanding Broadway or Off-Broadway Musical		Nominated
2022	Drama League Award	Distinguished Performer Award	Billy Crystal	Nominated
2022	Drama League Award	Distinguished Performer Award	Shoshana Bean	Nominated
2022	Outer Critics Circle Award	Outstanding New Broadway Musical		Nominated
2022	Outer Critics Circle Award	Outstanding Featured Actress in a Musical	Shoshana Bean	Nominated
2022	Outer Critics Circle Award	Outstanding Book of a Musical	Billy Crystal, Lowell Ganz, and Babaloo Mandel	Nominated
2022	Outer Critics Circle Award	Outstanding Projection Design	Jeff Sugg	Nominated
2022	Tony Awards	Best Musical		Nominated
2022	Tony Awards	Best Book of a Musical	Billy Crystal, Lowell Ganz, and Babaloo Mandel	Nominated
2022	Tony Awards	Best Original Score	Jason Robert Brown and Amanda Green	Nominated
2022	Tony Awards	Best Actor in a Musical	Billy Crystal	Nominated
2022	Tony Awards	Best Featured Actress in a Musical	Shoshana Bean	Nominated
2023	Grammy Awards	Best Musical Theater Album	Mr. Saturday Night	Nominated
