= World news =

News or journalism covering events in foreign countries

World news or international news or even foreign coverage is the news media jargon for news from abroad, about a country or a global subject. For journalism, it is a branch that deals with news either sent by foreign correspondents or news agencies, or – more recently – information that is gathered or researched through distance communication technologies, such as telephone, satellite TV or the internet.

Although in most of the English-speaking world this field is not usually regarded as a specific specialization for journalists, it is so in nearly all the world. Particularly in the United States, there is a blurred distinction between world news and "national" news when they include directly the national government or national institutions, such as wars in which the US are involved or summits of multilateral organizations in which the US are a member.

At the birth of modern journalism, most news were foreign, as registered by the courants of the 17th century in West and Central Europe, such as the Daily Courant (England), the Nieuwe Tijudinger (Antwerp), the Relation (Strasbourg), the Avisa Relation oder Zeitung (Wolfenbüttel) and the Courante Uyt Italien, Duytsland & C. (Amsterdam). Since these papers were aimed at bankers and merchants, they brought mostly news from other markets, which usually meant other nations. In any case, it is worthy to remark that nation-states were still incipient in 17th-century Europe.

From the 19th century on, with newspapers already established in Europe, the United States and a few other countries, innovations in telecommunications such as the telegraph made news from abroad easier to be spread. The first news agencies were then founded, like AFP (France), Reuters (UK), Wolff (currently DPA, Germany) and the AP (US).

War journalism is one of the best known subfields of world news (although war coverage can be national for the media of belligerent countries themselves).

== Foreign correspondents ==
There are essentially two types of reporters who do foreign reporting: the foreign correspondent (full-time reporter employed by a news source) and the special envoy (sent abroad to cover a specific subject, temporarily stationed in a location).

The correspondent is a reporter based in a foreign city (often the capital of a country) covering a region, a country or sometimes even an entire continent. He or she regularly files stories to the news editor. He/she gathers materials for these stories from local officials, members of the community, and the local media, as well as from events he/she directly witnesses. Correspondents typically stay in touch with the local community and maintain contacts with other journalists and correspondents in order to identify strategic sources in the government, among diplomats, members of the military and other organizations on the ground who may provide important information.

The number of foreign correspondents has dropped significantly over the past 20 years or more. Often, a media company is either uninterested or unable to afford to support a single correspondent, such as in many developing countries. In some places, they cannot obtain visas due to political constraints, or otherwise dangerous conditions prohibit a media company from stationing a reporter there. In recent years, the drop in foreign correspondents has been due to cutbacks within media companies (often, but not always, a result of economics alone). Among English language newspapers, only eight daily newspapers have full-time correspondents in more than ten foreign stations, four from the US, three from the UK and one from India:

35 – Wall Street Journal (US): Baghdad, Bangkok, Beijing, Beirut, Berlin, Brussels, Buenos Aires, Dubai, Frankfurt, Hong Kong, Istanbul, Jakarta, Jerusalem, Johannesburg, Kabul, Kuala Lumpur, Lagos, London, Manila, Mexico City, Moscow, Mumbai, New Delhi, Paris, Prague, Rio de Janeiro, Rome, São Paulo, Seoul, Shanghai, Singapore, Taipei, Tokyo, Toronto, Zurich

24 – New York Times (US): Baghdad, Beijing, Beirut, Berlin, Cairo, Caracas, Dakar, Hong Kong, Islamabad, Jakarta, Jerusalem, Johannesburg, Kabul, London, Mexico City, Moscow, Mumbai, Nairobi, New Delhi, Paris, Rome, São Paulo, Shanghai, Tokyo

19 – Financial Times (UK): Beijing, Berlin, Bombay, Brussels, Dubai, Frankfurt, Hong Kong, Jakarta, Jerusalem, Moscow, Mumbai, New Delhi, New York, Paris, Taipei, Tokyo, Shanghai, Sydney, Washington

17 – Washington Post (US): Baghdad, Beijing, Berlin, Bogotá, Cairo, Islamabad, Jerusalem, Kabul, London, Mexico City, Moscow, Nairobi, New Delhi, Paris, Shanghai, Tehran, Tokyo

15 – The Guardian (UK): Accra, Bangkok, Beijing, Berlin, Brussels, Kabul, Islamabad, Jerusalem, Los Angeles, Madrid, New York, Paris, Rome, Tehran, Tokyo

13 – The Daily Telegraph (UK): Beijing, Brussels, Jerusalem, Kabul, Los Angeles, Moscow, Nairobi, New Delhi, New York, Paris, Shanghai, Sydney, Washington

13 – Los Angeles Times (US): Baghdad, Beijing, Beirut, Cairo, Islamabad, Jerusalem, Johannesburg, Kabul, London, Mexico City, Moscow, New Delhi, Seoul

12 – The Hindu (India): Addis Ababa, Beijing, Colombo, Dhaka, Dubai, Islamabad, Kathmandu, London, Moscow, Paris, Singapore, Washington

When reporters working abroad have no permanent labor contract with media outlets, they are called stringers. Since they have no salary, stringers usually produce material for several different companies at once.

== News agencies ==
A news agency is an organization of journalists established to supply news reports to news organizations: newspapers, magazines, and radio and television broadcasters. Such an agency may also be referred to as a wire service, newswire or news service. The bulk of major news agency services contains foreign news.

The major news agencies generally prepare hard news stories and feature articles that can be used by other news organizations with little or no modification, and then sell them to other news organizations. They provide these articles in bulk electronically through wire services (originally they used telegraphy; today they frequently use the Internet). Corporations, individuals, analysts and intelligence agencies may also subscribe.

== See also ==
- World News (disambiguation)
- Global news flow
