= David Paymer =

American actor and director (born 1954)

- Born: David Emmanuel Paymer; August 30, 1954 (age 72); Oceanside, New York, U.S.
- Education: University of Michigan
- Occupations: Actor, director, comedian
- Years active: 1979–present
- Spouse: Liz Georges (m. 1988)
- Children: 2

David Emmanuel Paymer (born August 30, 1954) is an American actor and television director. He is known for his character actor roles on stage and screen. He has received nominations for an Academy Award, a Golden Globe Awards, a Grammy Award, and two Screen Actors Guild Awards.

Paymer was nominated for an Academy Award for Best Supporting Actor for playing a caring brother and exhausted agent in the showbiz drama Mr. Saturday Night (1992). He is also known for his comedic roles in: Airplane II: The Sequel (1982), Crazy People (1990), City Slickers (1991), Get Shorty (1995), The American President (1995), Carpool (1996), State and Main (2000), and In Good Company (2004) as well as dramatic roles in Quiz Show (1994), Searching for Bobby Fischer (1993), Nixon (1995), Amistad (1997), The Hurricane (1999), Ocean's Thirteen (2007) and Jack Ryan: Shadow Recruit (2014).

== Early life and education ==
Paymer was born in Oceanside, New York on August 30, 1954. He is the son of Sylvia, a travel agent, and Marvin Paymer, a pianist and musical director who originally worked in the scrap metal business. They divorced in 1973. Paymer is Jewish. He has a brother, Steve. His mother was born in Belgium and left for the United States to escape the Nazi occupation.

Paymer graduated from the University of Michigan with a Bachelor of Arts in theater and psychology.

== Career ==
Paymer played a cab driver in his film debut The In-Laws. He has appeared in over 90 films in his career. He has also appeared in many popular television shows, including: Taxi, Happy Days, L.A. Law, Cheers, Ghost Whisperer, Law & Order: Special Victims Unit, Entourage, Diff'rent Strokes, The Good Wife, and Family Ties. He has had recurring roles on Cheers, Murphy Brown, and The Larry Sanders Show. He has also appeared in such films as: Amistad, City Hall, RFK and Into the West. He received an Academy Award nomination for Mr. Saturday Night. His voice-over work includes Sheldon in the Kids' WB cartoon series Channel Umptee-3, and neurotic Welsh Terrier Mel in Balto 3: Wings of Change.

Paymer has directed episodes of several popular television series, including: Gilmore Girls, Grey's Anatomy, One Tree Hill, Melrose Place, Everwood, Brothers & Sisters and Bunheads.

== Personal life ==
He is married to Liz Georges. They have two children, including singer Jules Paymer.

== Filmography ==
=== Film ===
Year	Title	Role	Notes
1979	The In-Laws	Cab Driver	
1982	Airplane II: The Sequel	Court Photographer	
1984	Best Defense	Kurly	
1984	Irreconcilable Differences	Alan Sluiser	
1985	Perfect	Managing Editor	
1986	Howard the Duck	Larry	
1986	Night of the Creeps	Young scientist	
1987	No Way Out	David	
1988	Rock 'n' Roll Mom	Boris	
1989	No Holds Barred	Unger	
1990	Crazy People	George	
1991	City Slickers	Ira Shalowitz	
1992	Mr. Saturday Night	Stan Young	
1993	Searching for Bobby Fischer	Kalev	
1993	Heart and Souls	Hal the driver	
1994	City Slickers II: The Legend of Curly's Gold	Ira Shalowitz	
1994	In Search of Dr. Seuss	Ad Man	
1994	Quiz Show	Dan Enright	
1995	Get Shorty	Leo Devoe	
1995	The American President	Leon Kodak	
1995	Nixon	Ron Ziegler	
1996	Unforgettable	Curtis Avery	
1996	City Hall	Abe Goodman	
1996	Carpool	Daniel Miller	
1997	The 6^{th} Man	Coach Pederson	
1997	Gang Related	Elliot Goff	
1997	Amistad	John Forsyth	
1998	The Lesser Evil	George	
1998	Outside Ozona	Alan Defaux	
1998	Mighty Joe Young	Dr. Harry Ruben	
1999	Payback	Arthur Stegman	
1999	Chill Factor	Dr. Richard Long	
1999	Mumford	Dr. Ernest Delbanco	
1999	The Hurricane	Myron Bedlock	
2000	State and Main	Marty Rossen	
2000	Bait	Agent Wooly	
2000	Bounce	Prosecuting Attorney Mandel	Uncredited
2000	Enemies of Laughter	Paul Halpern	
2001	Focus	Mr. Finkelstein	
2001	Bartleby	The Boss	
2002	The Burial Society	Morry Zimmer	
2003	Alex & Emma	John Shaw	
2004	In Good Company	Morty	
2004	Spartan	TV News Anchor	Uncredited
2004	Balto III: Wings of Change	Mel (voice)	Direct-to-video
2005	Checking Out	Ted Applebaum	
2005	Marilyn Hotchkiss' Ballroom Dancing & Charm School	Rafael Horowitz	
2005	My Suicidal Sweetheart	Max, Sr.	
2005	School of Life	Matt Warner	
2007	Resurrecting the Champ	Whitley	
2007	Ocean's Thirteen	V.U.P.	
2008	Redbelt	Richard	
2009	Drag Me to Hell	Mr. Jacks	
2011	Twixt	Sam Malkin	
2012	The Five-Year Engagement	Pete Solomon	
2014	Jack Ryan: Shadow Recruit	Dixon Lewis	
2014	Two-Bit Waltz	The Lawyer	
2016	The Pickle Recipe	Uncle Morty	
2017	Lemon	Dr. Gold	
2018	Accident Man	Milton	
2019	The Sunlit Night	Levi	
2019	Where'd You Go, Bernadette	Jay Ross	
2020	Horse Girl	Doctor	
2020	Bad Therapy	Dr. Edward Kingsley	
2024	Bad Shabbos	Richard	

=== Television ===
Year	Title	Role	Notes
1979	ABC Afterschool Special	Ralph	Episode: "Make Believe Marriage"
1980	Barney Miller	Felix Morrissey	Episode: "Guns"
1980	Lou Grant	Roy	Episode: "Nightside"
1981	Happy Days	Dwayne	Episode: "If You Knew Rosa"
1981	House Calls	Johnny Vance	Episode: "No Balls, One Strike"
1981	This House Possessed	Pasternak	Television film
1981	Hart to Hart	Orderly	Episode: "Hart of Darkness"
1982	Cagney & Lacey	Vinnie	Episode: "You Call This Plain Clothes?"
1982	Open All Night	Punker	Episode: "Sitting Ducks"
1982	Taxi	Ned	Episode: "Alex the Gofer"
1982	Fame	The Salesman	Episode: "The Sell-Out"
1983	The Greatest American Hero	The Gatekeeper	Episode: "Wizards and Warlocks"
1983	Grace Kelly	Jay Kanter	Television film
1983	Gloria	Robber	Episode: "Gloria on the Couch"
1983	The Powers of Matthew Star	Dr. Benson	Episode: "Matthew Star D.O.A."
1983	The Jeffersons	David	Episode: "I Do, I Don't"
1984	Hill Street Blues	Attorney Michael Shapiro	Episode: "The Other Side of Oneness"
1984	Her Life as a Man	Ted	Television film
1984–1986	The Paper Chase	Myslesky	6 episodes
1984–1988	Cagney & Lacey	Todd Feldberg	10 episodes
1985	Scarecrow and Mrs. King	Dr. Fronan	Episode: "DOA: Delirious on Arrival"
1985	Hardcastle and McCormick	Patrick Burke	Episode: "The Yankee Clipper"
1985	Family Ties	Larry Harris	Episodes 58 & 66 "Oh Donna" & "Cold Storage"
1985	Cheers	Reporter	Episode: "King of the Hill"
1985	Love, Mary	David Lewis	Television film
1986	Diff'rent Strokes	Mr. Wallace	2 episodes
1986	Moonlighting	Camille's PR	Episode: "Camille"
1986	Cheers	Phil Schumacher	2 episodes
1986	Pleasures	Stanley	Television film
1986–1987	Downtown	Captain David Kiner	14 episodes
1987	21 Jump Street	Mike Ferris	Episode: "16 Blown to 35"
1987	Rags to Riches	Arnie	Episode: "Born to Ride"
1987	My Sister Sam	Bob	Episode: "And They Said It Would Never Last"
1987	Private Eye	Archie Hammond	Episode: "Blue Hotel"
1987	It's Garry Shandling's Show	Richard Kimble	Episode: "The Fugitive"
1988	St. Elsewhere	Mr. Bickle	2 episodes
1988	Simon & Simon	Brian Sadler	Episode: "Ain't Gonna Get It from Me, Jack"
1988	Walt Disney's Wonderful World of Color	Boris	Episode: "Rock 'n Roll Mom"
1988	Who's the Boss?	Jack	Episode: "A Jack Story"
1988	A Year in the Life	Defense Attorney	Episode: "Fathers and Other Strangers""
1988	Walt Disney's Wonderful World of Color	Mr. Oliphant	Episode: "The Absent-Minded Professor"
1988	Duet	Andy	Episode: "One Man Out"
1989	Matlock	Lenny Marcus	Episode: "The Prisoner: Part 1"
1989	Hooperman	Leonard	Episode: "The Sure Thing"
1990	L.A. Law	Joey Paul	Episode: "Whatever Happened to Hannah?"
1990	Mancuso, F.B.I.	Lloyd	Episode: "Adamant Five"
1990	Cop Rock	Homeless Man	Episode: "Oli of Ol' Lay"
1990–1991	Murphy Brown	Dr. Bishop	2 episodes
1991	Jake and the Fatman	Henry Stocker	Episode: "I'm Gonna Live Til I Die"
1991	Equal Justice	Stuey	Episode: "Sleeping with the Enemy"
1991–1992	The Commish	Arnie Metzger	10 episodes
1992–1998	The Larry Sanders Show	Norman Litkey	6 episodes
1993	Tales from the Crypt	Andy Conway	Episode: "Two for the Show"
1994	Cagney & Lacey: The Return	Feldberg	Television film
1994–1995	Aaahh!!! Real Monsters	Murray (voice)	2 episodes
1995	Cagney & Lacey: Together Again	Feldberg	Television film
1995	Santo Bugito	The Professor, Centipede, Biker Bug (voices)	Episode: "My Name Is Revenge"
1996	Crime of the Century	David Wilentz	Television film
1997–1998	Channel Umptee-3	Sheldon S. Cargo (voice)	13 episodes
1998	The New Batman Adventures	Frank (voice)	Episode: "Torch Song"
1998	Godzilla: The Series	Dean Whitehead (voice)	Episode: "Talkin' Trash"
1998	The Wild Thornberrys	Finch, Iguana (voices)	2 episodes
1998	Pinky, Elmyra & the Brain	Shad Equippo (voice)	2 episodes
1999	Dash and Lilly	Arthur Kober	Television film
2000	Rocket Power	Director (voice)	Episode: "The Wrath of Don"
2000	For Love or Country: The Arturo Sandoval Story	Embassy Interviewer	Television film
2000	Partners	Bob	Television film
2001	Night Visions	Jim Osgoode	Episode: "Neighborhood Watch"
2002	Without a Trace	Mr. Freedman	Episode: "Birthday Boy"
2002	Justice League	Chancellor (voice)	Episode: "War World"
2002	Joe and Max	Joe Jacobs	Television film
2002	RFK	Dick Goodwin	Television film
2003–2004	Line of Fire	Jonah Malloy	13 episodes
2004	Static Shock	Mason Andrews (voice)	Episode: "Hoop Squad"
2004	Century City	Miller Sisto	Episode: "Pilot"
2004	Jack & Bobby	Adam Chasen	2 episodes
2005	School of Life	Matt Warner	Television film
2005	Into the West	Daniel Royer	Episode: "Ghost Dance"
2005	Warm Springs	Louis Howe	Television film
2006	Entourage	Sammy Kane	Episode: "I Wanna Be Sedated"
2006	Ghost Whisperer	Adam Godfrey	Episode: "A Grave Matter"
2007	Brothers & Sisters	Donald Dudley	Episode: "All in the Family"
2008	October Road	Dr. Dough Levy	Episode: "Dancing Days Are Here Again"; also directed 4 episodes
2008	My Name Is Earl	Clark Clark	Episode: "Monkeys Take a Bath"
2009–2016	The Good Wife	Judge Richard Cuesta	9 episodes
2010	Law & Order: Special Victims Unit	Dr. Stephen Elroy	Episode: "Ace"
2011	The Mentalist	James Panzer	Episode: "Blinking Red Light"
2013–2014	Perception	Rueben Bauer	4 episodes
2017	Pure Genius	Douglas Prescott	Episode: "Hero Worship"
2017	There's... Johnny!	Dr. Neuberger	Episode: "Take Me to Church"
2017–2018	I'm Dying Up Here	Ernie Falk	5 episodes
2017–2022	The Marvelous Mrs. Maisel	Harry Drake	5 episodes
2018	The Conners	Gary	Episode: "There Won't Be Blood"
2019	Brooklyn Nine-Nine	Dr. William Tate	Episode: "The Therapist"
2019	On Becoming a God in Central Florida	Buck Bridges	2 episodes
2019	Room 104	Robert	Episode: "Night Shift"
2020	Star Trek: Picard	Dr. Benayoun	Episode: "Maps and Legends"
2020	Briarpatch	Jimmy Jr.	3 episodes
2020–2023	Dave	Don	11 episodes
2021	The Morning Show	Hannah's Father	Episode: "Ghosts"
2022	Minx	Myron	Episode: "You happened to me"
2024	St. Denis Medical	Bob	Episode: "Ho-Ho-Hollo"
2026	Adults	Sandy Adler	Episode: "Vote for Paul Baker"

=== Theater ===
Year	Title	Role	Venue	Ref.
1978	Grease	Sonny Latierri	Broadhurst Theater, Broadway	
1999	The Odd Couple	Felix Ungar	L.A. Theatre Works	
2008	Two Unrelated Plays by David Mamet	Pelargon	Mark Taper Forum, Los Angeles	
2020	The Christopher Boy's Communion	Mr. Stone	Odyssey Theatre, Los Angeles	
2021	Mr. Saturday Night	Stan Yankelman		Barrington Stage Company
2022	Mr. Saturday Night	Stan Yankelman	Nederlander Theater, Broadway	

== Directorial credits ==
Year	Title	Notes
2004–2005	Everwood	4 episodes
2004–2006	One Tree Hill	2 episodes
2005	Jack & Bobby	Episode: "Stand by Me"
2005	Inconceivable	Episode: "Face Your Demon Semen" (unaired)
2006	Windfall	Episode: "Crash Into You"
2006	Grey's Anatomy	Episode: "Break on Through"
2006	Pepper Dennis	Episode: "Dennis, Bulgari, Big Losers at ACoRNS"
2006, 2010	Medium	2 episodes
2007	Brothers & Sisters	Episode: "All in the Family"
2007	What About Brian	Episode: "What About the Exes..."
2007	Gilmore Girls	Episode: "Will You Be My Lorelai Gilmore?"
2007	Heartland	Episode: "Domino Effect"
2007	Side Order of Life	Episode: "Coming Out"
2007–2009	Brothers & Sisters	4 episodes
2008	The Unit	Episode: "Inquisition"
2008–2009	Privileged	4 episodes
2009	Melrose Place	Episode: "June"
2009–2012	Make It or Break It	7 episodes
2010	Men of a Certain Age	Episode: "Powerless"
2010	Life Unexpected	Episode: "Bride Unbridled"
2010	Hellcats	Episode: "Nobody Loves Me But My Mother"
2010	No Ordinary Family	Episode: "No Ordinary Visitors"
2011	90210	Episode: "The Enchanted Donkey"
2011–2015	Hart of Dixie	11 episodes
2011–2015	Switched at Birth	6 episodes
2012–2013	Bunheads	2 episodes
2013	The Carrie Diaries	Episode: "Endgame"
2013	Mistresses	Episode: "A Kiss Is Just a Kiss?"
2013	The Mentalist	Episode: "Red and Itchy"
2013	The Fosters	Episode: "Vigil"
2013	Franklin & Bash	Episode: "Shoot to Thrill"
2016	Recovery Road	Episode: "My Loose Thread"
2016	Lucifer	Episode: "Favorite Son"

== Awards and nominations ==
Year	Association	Category	Work	Result	Ref.
1992	Academy Awards	Best Supporting Actor	Mr. Saturday Night	Nominated	
1992	Golden Globe Awards	Best Supporting Actor – Motion Picture	Mr. Saturday Night	Nominated	
1995	Screen Actors Guild Awards	Outstanding Cast in a Motion Picture	Get Shorty	Nominated	
1995	Screen Actors Guild Awards	Outstanding Cast in a Motion Picture	Nixon	Nominated	
2000	Florida Film Critics Circle	Best Cast	State and Main	Won	
2000	National Board of Review	Best Cast	State and Main	Won	
2000	Online Film Critics Society	Best Cast	State and Main	Won	
1993	CableACE Awards	Actor in a Dramatic Series	Tales from the Crypt	Nominated	
1996	Golden Globe Awards	Best Supporting Actor – Series, Miniseries or Television Film	Crime of the Century	Nominated	
2003	Satellite Award	Best Actor – Television Series Drama	Line of Fire	Nominated	
2023	Grammy Awards	Best Musical Theater Album	Mr. Saturday Night	Nominated	
