= Mike Wazowski =

Fictional protagonist of Monsters, Inc.

- Monsters, Inc. character
- First appearance: Monsters, Inc. (2001)
- Created by: Pete Docter; Jill Culton; Jeff Pidgeon; Ralph Eggleston
- Voiced by: Billy Crystal (films, Monsters at Work, shorts); Carlos Alazraqui (video games, rides and commercials); Noah Johnston (young; Monsters University)

In-universe information
- Full name: Michael Wazowski
- Species: Green sphere-shaped cyclops
- Gender: Male
- Title(s): Senior Co-President of Monsters, Incorporated, Chief Executive Vice-Deputy Administrative Director of Comedy Resources Management (S.C.P.O.M.I.C.E-V.D.A.D.O.C.R.M.) (Monsters at Work)
- Occupation: Scare assistant (Monsters, Inc., excluding epilogue); Co-CEO of Monsters, Inc. (Monsters at Work onward, including Monsters, Inc.'s epilogue); Jokester (coterminous with co-CEO role)
- Family: Mrs. Wazowski (Mother); Russell (Cousin)
- Significant other: Celia Mae

Michael "Mike" Wazowski is a fictional character who appears in the Disney/Pixar's Monsters Inc. franchise, and one of the main protagonists of the series, alongside Sulley. He is a green one-eyed round monster with two arms, legs, and small horns. He is primarily voiced by Billy Crystal in the film series, shorts, and the Disney+ series.

== Conception and creation ==
In early versions of the film, Mike had not yet been added. Later on in development when he was added, his early designs consisted of no arms and his size was smaller with a more hostile attitude. Billy Crystal, having regretted turning down the part of Buzz Lightyear in Toy Story (1995) years prior, immediately accepted the role of Mike. Crystal later stated in an interview that he would not have been right as Buzz and admitted that Mike was rather the perfect role for him instead. He was named after Mike Oznowicz, who was the father of director and Muppet performer Frank Oz.

== Appearances ==
=== Monsters University ===
During a class field trip to the energy factory Monsters, Inc., a young Mike gets inspired to become a professional scarer. In his later years, he gets accepted into the titular college's scare program, where he becomes acquainted with classmate James P. Sullivan and his new roommate, Randall Boggs. Wazowski initially dislikes Sullivan for his cocky personality and slacker attitude, but takes a liking towards Boggs.

During their final scare exam, a feud between Wazowski and Sullivan results in both monsters being expelled from the program. However, Wazowski works out a deal with the Dean to re-enroll in the program on the stipulation that he wins the Scare Games. To compete, he joins Oozma Kappa and reluctantly accepts Sullivan as the final teammate.

Wazowski and Sullivan begin to form a friendship as they compete together. During the final scare-simulator exam, Sullivan rigs the child dummy to maximize its sensitivity, allowing any minor movement to trigger a top score. This makes Wazowski appear to win the scare games by delivering a record breaking score, much to the shock of everyone there. Wazowski is initially overjoyed by this, but upon discovering Sulley's actions, is distraught and later breaks into the door-lab to unsuccessfully collect a human child's scream. To his heartbreak, he finds out that he is not scary. In order to get back through the deactivated door, both monsters work together to scare adults into activating the door from their side, although the doors in the room along with the canisters are destroyed in the process. These actions result in both of them getting expelled from school, although Dean Hardscrabble wishes them well after they both surprised her with the door-breaking maneuver. The two then apply as workers in the Monsters, Inc. mailroom. They advance through the ranks until Sullivan becomes a scarer, with Wazowski as his assistant.

=== Monsters, Inc. ===
Mike runs Sulley's station on the scare floor and they are best friends and roommates. Mike is in a relationship with Celia Mae at this time. Additionally, Mike helps Sulley in his mission to save Boo. While Sulley bonds with Boo, Mike desperately wants her gone. Randall finds out his involvement from the glimpse of him near Boo in a newspaper and Mike makes a deal with him to return Boo. However, this makes Sulley suspicious and Mike tries to prove him wrong. Randall ends up abducting Mike for the scream extractor. At the last second, Mike is saved from the extractor by Sulley and after he and Sulley foil Randall's plot, they report Waternoose's involvement in the scheme to the CDA.

=== Monsters at Work ===
Following the arrest of Waternoose, Mike and Sulley are put in charge of Monsters, Inc. He works as a Jokester and trains former scarers to be Jokesters.

== Reception ==
Mike's character has been generally well received by critics and audiences. Rolling Stone considers him the 8th best Pixar character, going on to state "It's weird to think of a lumpy green thing as an everyman, but Billy Crystal's voice helps make Mike a monster of the people." Additionally, Victoria Robertson from Screen Rant listed him as the 7th best Pixar character, stating "perhaps it's the little quirks that make him so great, his skittishness, despite the fact that he's a monster, or his comical and romantic qualities that shine throughout the film, but whatever it is, Wazowski made a name for himself." Crystal considers Mike to be his favorite role, citing him as "fast and edgy; speedy and nuts; aggressive and romantic… and positive."

=== Legacy ===
Mike has appeared in a wide variety of various internet memes. One such example is the face-swap meme, where Sulley's face is photoshopped onto Mike, as well as "Mike Wazowski explaining things" where Mike is shown complaining to Sulley and Roz about the games in the rec room, taken from a cutscene in the 2001 Disney Interactive game Monsters Inc. Rec Room Arcade. Mike and Sulley were planned to be featured in the convention hall scenes in Chip 'n Dale: Rescue Rangers, but they were replaced with He-Man and Skeletor.

== In other media ==
=== Other films ===
Mike made a cameo appearance at the end of the credits of Finding Nemo (2003), diving on the seabed.

=== Video games ===
As one of the main characters of the Monsters, Inc. franchise, Mike has regular appearances in the video games of the franchise, usually as a playable character.

He also made appearances in other Disney crossover video games, such as the Disney Infinity series (2013-2015), where as with the other playable characters in the game a tie-in figure for him was also released, Kingdom Hearts III (2019), appearing as one of Sora's party members, and Disney Mirrorverse (2022), where he is depicted wearing combat armor.
