= City Slickers =

1991 film directed by Ron Underwood

- Theatrical release poster by John Alvin
- Directed by: Ron Underwood
- Written by: Lowell Ganz; Babaloo Mandel
- Produced by: Irby Smith
- Starring: Billy Crystal; Daniel Stern; Bruno Kirby; Patricia Wettig; Helen Slater; Jack Palance
- Cinematography: Dean Semler
- Edited by: O. Nicholas Brown
- Music by: Marc Shaiman
- Production companies: Castle Rock Entertainment; Face Productions; Nelson Entertainment
- Distributed by: Columbia Pictures
- Release date: June 7, 1991
- Running time: 114 minutes
- Country: United States
- Language: English
- Budget: $26 million
- Box office: $179 million

City Slickers is a 1991 American Western comedy film directed by Ron Underwood and starring Billy Crystal, Daniel Stern, Bruno Kirby and Jack Palance, with supporting roles by Patricia Wettig, Helen Slater, Noble Willingham and Jake Gyllenhaal making his acting debut.

The film's screenplay was written by Lowell Ganz and Babaloo Mandel, and it was shot in New York City, New Mexico, Durango, Colorado, and Spain. City Slickers was released by Columbia Pictures on June 7, 1991. The film received positive reviews from critics and grossed $179 million against a $26 million budget. For his performance, Palance won the Academy Award for Best Supporting Actor.

A sequel titled The Legend of Curly's Gold was released in 1994 with the same cast, with the exception of Kirby, who was replaced by Jon Lovitz in a different role.

== Plot ==
In Pamplona, Spain, middle-aged friends Mitch Robbins, Ed Furrilo and Phil Berquist participate in the running of the bulls. As they fly back in the airplane, Mitch tells Ed he is getting fed up with their road trips. A year later, back home in New York City, Mitch realizes he and his friends use adventure trips as escapism from their boring lives, since he is disillusioned with his radio advertising sales job, Phil is trapped in a loveless marriage to his shrewish wife Arlene while managing a supermarket owned by his father-in-law who bullies him, and Ed is a successful and outgoing sporting goods salesman who recently married Kim, a significantly younger woman, but is unwilling to fully settle down.

At Mitch's 39th birthday party, Phil and Ed give Mitch a trip for all three to go on a two-week cattle drive from New Mexico to Colorado. Phil's 20-year-old employee Nancy unexpectedly arrives at the party and announces she tested positive in a pregnancy test, causing Arlene to walk out after a fight. Mitch's wife, Barbara, insists he go on the cattle drive to find his smile again.

In New Mexico, the trio meet ranch owner Clay Stone and their fellow cattle drivers: brothers and ice cream company founders Barry and Ira Shalowitz, young and attractive Bonnie Rayburn, father-son dentists Ben and Steve Jessup, ranch hands Jeff and T.R., and Cookie the cook. Mitch confronts Jeff and T.R. when they begin sexually harassing Bonnie. Trail boss Curly intervenes, though he also humiliates Mitch.

During the drive, Mitch accidentally causes a stampede which destroys the camp. While searching for stray cows, Mitch discovers Curly has a kind and wise nature beneath his gruff exterior. Curly encourages Mitch to discover the "one thing" in his life that is most important to him. Along the way, Mitch helps deliver a calf from a dying cow. Mitch names the calf Norman. Shortly after, Curly suffers a fatal heart attack, leaving the drive under Jeff and T.R.'s control. Cookie gets drunk and inadvertently sends the chuck wagon over a cliff, breaking his legs in the process.

After the Jessups leave to take Cookie to a nearby town (being more qualified because of their medical training in dentistry), Jeff and T.R. become intoxicated with Cookie's secret stash. A fight ensues when they threaten to kill Norman and assault Mitch. Phil and Ed intervene, and Phil holds Jeff at gunpoint, which unleashes his pent-up emotions. Soon after, Jeff and T.R. abandon the group. Bonnie and the Shalowitzes continue on to the Colorado ranch, while Ed and Phil remain behind to finish the drive. Mitch also leaves but soon returns to rejoin his friends.

After braving a heavy storm, the trio drives the herd to Colorado. When Norman nearly drowns as the herd crosses a river, Mitch acts to save him. Both are swept down current, but Phil and Ed rescue them. They safely reach the Colorado ranch. When Stone offers to reimburse everyone's fee, the Jessups prefer returning the herd to New Mexico. However, Clay reveals he is selling the herd to a meat-packing company. Mitch, Phil, and Ed initially believe they saved the cattle for nothing, but decide to use their experience to help re-evaluate their lives.

The men return to New York City. Mitch, a happier man, reunites with Barbara and their two children Holly and Danny; he has also brought Norman home as a pet(he'll later put him in a petting zoo). Phil, having learned earlier Nancy was not pregnant, begins a relationship with Bonnie. Ed intends to start a family with Kim. Mitch is ready to restart his life with a new stance.

== Cast ==
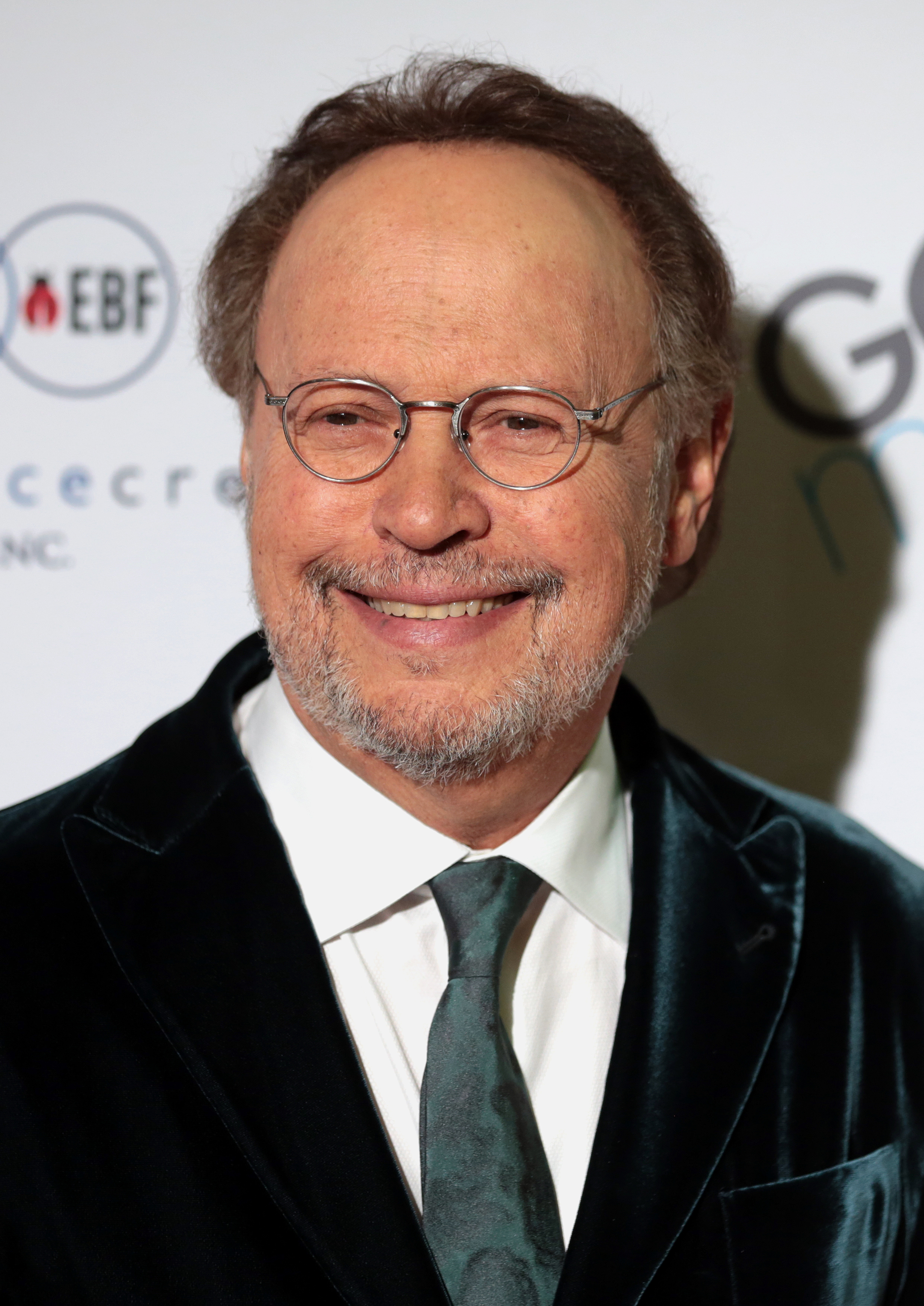
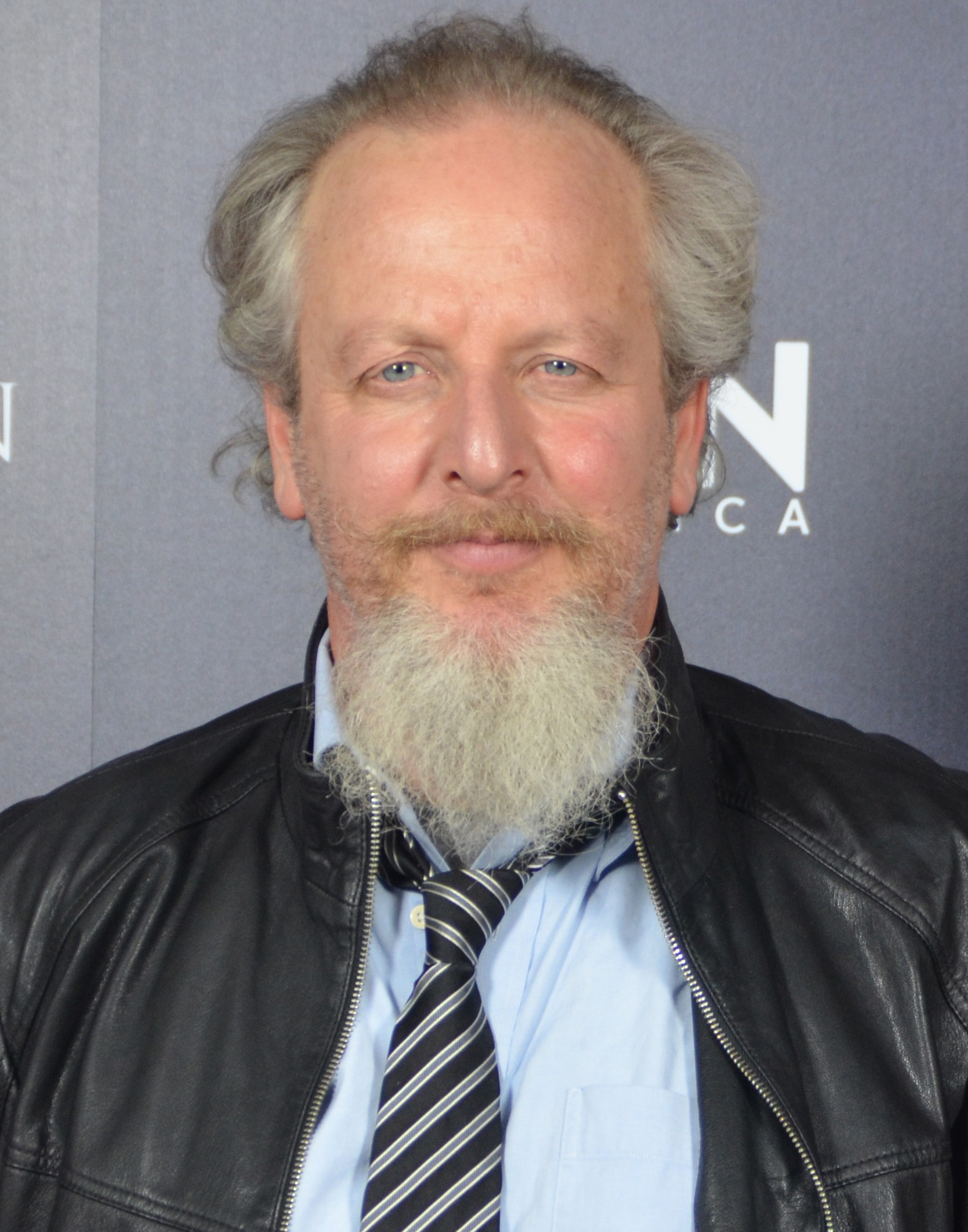
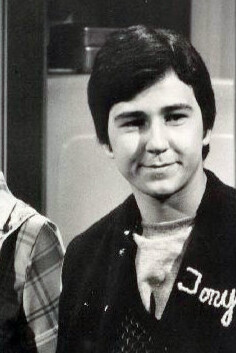
(L to R) Billy Crystal (pictured in 2018), Daniel Stern (2014) and Bruno Kirby (1972)
- Billy Crystal as Mitch Robbins, a radio station sales executive.
- Daniel Stern as Phil Berquist, a supermarket manager.
- Bruno Kirby as Ed Furillo, a sporting goods salesman.
- Patricia Wettig as Barbara Robbins, Mitch's wife.
- Helen Slater as Bonnie Rayburn, a fellow cattle driver.
- Jack Palance as Curly Washburn, the leader of the cattle drive.

The cast also includes Jayne Meadows and Alan Charof as Mitch's parents, and Lindsay Crystal and Jake Gyllenhaal as his children Holly and Danny Robbins. Jeffrey Tambor appears as Mitch's supervisor Lou; Walker Brandt plays Ed's newlywed wife Kim Furillo; Karla Tamburrelli appears as Phil's wife Arlene Berquist, and Noble Willingham and Molly McClure plays dude ranch owner Clay Stone and his wife Millie. Yeardley Smith has a cameo role as Phil's employee Nancy.

Curly's fellow cattle drivers include Bill Henderson and Phill Lewis as father-and-son dentists Ben and Steve Jessup, Josh Mostel and David Paymer as sibling entrepreneurs Barry and Ira Shalowitz, Kyle Secor and Dean Hallo as ranch hands Jeff and T.R. and Tracey Walter as Cookie the cook.

== Production ==
The film's plot, which consists of inexperienced cowboys battling villains as they press on with their cattle drive after the death of their leader Curly Washburn (Jack Palance), was conceived to be similar to John Wayne's The Cowboys, although that was a Western drama as opposed to a comedy.

In his 2013 memoir, Still Foolin' Em, Billy Crystal writes of how the casting of the film came about. "Palance," he says, "was the first choice from the beginning, but had a commitment to make another film." He wrote that he contacted Charles Bronson about the part, only to be rudely rebuffed because the character dies. Palance got out of his other obligation to join the cast. Rick Moranis, originally cast as Phil Berquist, had to leave the production due to his wife Ann Belsky's illness. Daniel Stern was a late replacement in the role. The film was also the debut of actor Jake Gyllenhaal.

== Reception ==
=== Critical response ===
On Rotten Tomatoes, City Slickers received an 85% rating based on 136 reviews. The site's critical consensus reads, "With a supremely talented cast and just enough midlife drama to add weight to its wildly silly overtones, City Slickers uses universal themes to earn big laughs." On Metacritic the film has a weighted average score of 70 out of 100, based on reviews from 25 critics. Audiences surveyed by CinemaScore gave the film an average grade of "A" on a scale of A+ to F.

Roger Ebert of the Chicago Sun-Times gave the film three and a half out of four, and wrote: "City Slickers comes packaged as one kind of movie—a slapstick comedy about white-collar guys on a dude ranch—and it delivers on that level while surprising me by being much more ambitious, and successful, than I expected. This is the proverbial comedy with the heart of truth, the tear in the eye along with the belly laugh. It's funny, and it adds up to something." On At the Movies, Ebert's colleague Gene Siskel praised the film as well-written and heartfelt, echoing Ebert's "thumbs up," but regretted the lone female character on the cattle drive (Bonnie) was underutilized in offering insight into the main characters' difficulties with women. Jeff Menell of The Hollywood Reporter said the film "provides plenty of laughs and several one-liners that will be repeatedly heard throughout the coming months."

=== Awards and honors ===
Jack Palance, for his role as Curly, won the 1992 Academy Award for Best Supporting Actor, which was the only Oscar nomination the film received. His acceptance speech for the award is best remembered for his demonstration of one-armed push-ups, which he claimed convinced studio insurance agents that he was healthy enough to work on the film.

Billy Crystal was the 64th Academy Awards host, and used the humorous incident for several jokes throughout the evening. Later that night, Palance placed the Oscar on Crystal's shoulder and said, "Billy Crystal ... who thought it would be you?" Crystal added in his book, "We had a glass of champagne together, and I could only imagine what Charles Bronson was thinking as he went to sleep that night." The next year's 65th Academy Awards opened with Palance appearing to drag in a giant Academy Award, with Crystal (again the host) riding on the opposite end.

Award	Category	Nominee(s)	Result	Ref.
Academy Awards	Best Supporting Actor	Jack Palance	Won	
American Comedy Awards	Funniest Actor in a Motion Picture (Leading Role)	Billy Crystal	Won	
American Comedy Awards	Funniest Supporting Actor in a Motion Picture	Bruno Kirby	Nominated	
American Comedy Awards	Funniest Supporting Actor in a Motion Picture	Jack Palance	Won	
American Comedy Awards	Funniest Supporting Actor in a Motion Picture	Daniel Stern	Nominated	
Artios Awards	Outstanding Achievement in Feature Film Casting – Comedy	Pam Dixon	Nominated	
ASCAP Film and Television Music Awards	Top Box Office Films	Marc Shaiman	Won	
Chicago Film Critics Association Awards	Best Supporting Actor	Jack Palance	Nominated	
Genesis Awards	Best Feature Film		Won	
Golden Globe Awards	Best Motion Picture – Musical or Comedy		Nominated	
Golden Globe Awards	Best Actor in a Motion Picture – Musical or Comedy	Billy Crystal	Nominated	
Golden Globe Awards	Best Supporting Actor – Motion Picture	Jack Palance	Won	
MTV Movie Awards	Best Comedic Performance	Billy Crystal	Won	
People's Choice Awards	Favorite Comedy Motion Picture		Won	

The film is also recognized by American Film Institute in these lists:

- 2000: AFI's 100 Years...100 Laughs – #86
- 2005: AFI's 100 Years...100 Movie Quotes:
  - Mitch Robbins: "Hi, Curly, kill anyone today?"

Curly: "Day ain't over yet."
– Nominated

- 2005: AFI's 100 Years of Film Scores – Nominated

The film is ranked No. 73 on Bravo's "100 Funniest Movies".

== In popular culture ==
- The Billy Crystal episode of Muppets Tonight featured a parody entitled "City Schtickers", with Kermit the Frog (Steve Whitmire) and Fozzie Bear (Frank Oz) in Bruno Kirby and Daniel Stern's roles.
- Funny or Die produced a mash-up short that combined the film with the 2016 HBO series Westworld that featured Crystal and Stern.
