= 700 Sundays (film) =

- Promotional poster
- Based on: 700 Sundays by Billy Crystal
- Written by: Billy Crystal; Alan Zweibel
- Directed by: Des McAnuff
- Starring: Billy Crystal
- Country of origin: United States
- Original language: English

Original release
- Network: HBO
- Release: April 19, 2014

700 Sundays is a 2014 stand-up comedy concert film also known as Billy Crystal: 700 Sundays which was directed by Des McAnuff and starred Billy Crystal. It is based on Crystal's book 700 Sundays and the 2005 Broadway one man show for which Crystal earned a Special Tony Award. In 2013, a 54-performance revival was staged at the Imperial Theatre. HBO filmed the January 3–4, 2014 performances, 700 Sundays debuted on the network on April 19, 2014. The special received three Primetime Emmy Award nominations.

== Summary ==
The basis of the show from the title refers to the number of Sundays shared by Billy and his father, Jack Crystal, who died when Billy was 15. In the show, Crystal discusses his early childhood living in Brooklyn and the relationships he had with his parents and elderly Jewish relatives. His father owned the record label, Commodore Records which produced the music of Jazz legends such as Billie Holiday, Louis Armstrong, and Hot Lips Page.

== Production and release ==
Crystal performed this on Broadway at the Imperial Theatre and was filmed by HBO. The show ran on Broadway in 2005 earning Crystal a Special Tony Award.

The special was released on HBO April 19, 2014.

== Awards and nominations ==
Year	Award	Category	Nominated work	Result	Ref.
2014	Primetime Emmy Awards	Outstanding Variety Special	Billy Crystal: 700 Sundays	Nominated	
2014	Primetime Emmy Awards	Outstanding Writing for a Variety Special	Billy Crystal: 700 Sundays	Nominated	
2014	Primetime Emmy Awards	Outstanding Picture Editing for a Variety Special	Billy Crystal: 700 Sundays	Nominated	
2014	Directors Guild of America Award	Outstanding Directing for a Variety Special	Des McAnuff	Nominated	
