= 700 Sundays =

Autobiography by Billy Crystal

- Author: Billy Crystal
- Language: English
- Subject: Autobiography
- Publication place: United States
- Media type: Print (hardcover)
- Pages: 192 pp
- ISBN: 978-0-446-57867-7

700 Sundays is an autobiography written by Billy Crystal. The title refers to the number of Sundays shared by Billy and his father, Jack Crystal, who died when Billy was 15.

== Broadway ==
Crystal's stage adaptation was originally produced in 2004 as a "Page To Stage" production at La Jolla Playhouse. Opening on a Sunday in December 2004 at the Broadhurst Theatre, the one-man show won the 2005 Tony Award for Special Theatrical Event.

In 2013, a 54-performance revival was staged at the Imperial Theatre. HBO filmed the January 3–4, 2014 performances; the filmed version of 700 Sundays debuted on the network on April 19, 2014.
