= Mr. Saturday Night =

1992 film by Billy Crystal

- Theatrical release poster
- Directed by: Billy Crystal
- Written by: Billy Crystal; Babaloo Mandel; Lowell Ganz
- Produced by: Billy Crystal
- Starring: Billy Crystal; David Paymer; Julie Warner; Helen Hunt; Ron Silver
- Cinematography: Donald Peterman
- Edited by: Kent Beyda
- Music by: Marc Shaiman
- Production companies: Castle Rock Entertainment; New Line Cinema; Face Productions
- Distributed by: Columbia Pictures
- Release date: September 23, 1992
- Running time: 119 minutes
- Country: United States
- Language: English
- Budget: $43 million
- Box office: $23 million

Mr. Saturday Night is a 1992 American comedy-drama film that marked the directorial debut of its star, Billy Crystal.

It focuses on the rise and fall of Buddy Young Jr., a stand-up comedian. Crystal produced and co-wrote the screenplay with the writing duo Babaloo Mandel and Lowell Ganz. It was filmed from November 1991 to March 1992. The film was produced by Castle Rock Entertainment, New Line Cinema, and Face Productions, and distributed by Columbia Pictures. It premiered on September 23, 1992. David Paymer was nominated for the Academy Award for Best Supporting Actor for this film.

== Plot ==
Stand-up comedian Buddy Young Jr. becomes a television star with the help of his brother, agent and manager, Stan, but alienates many of those closest to him once his career began to fade.

Through a series of flashbacks, the brothers are seen during childhood entertaining their family in the living room. Buddy cultivates a career as a comic in the primarily Jewish resorts of the Catskills, where he meets his future wife, Elaine.

As Buddy's fame grows, so does his ego. He hits the big time with his own Saturday night television show. But despite the warnings of his brother, Buddy uses offensive material on the air, costing him his show and causing his career to suffer, officially ending when his stand-up act is scheduled right after the first appearance of The Beatles on The Ed Sullivan Show, causing his act to be ignored and cut short. Furious over being snubbed, he goes into an offensive tirade and quits.

As an older man, long past his prime, Buddy is estranged from Stan as well as from his daughter, Susan. A chance at redemption comes when a young agent named Annie Wells finds him work and even gets Buddy a shot at a role in a top director's new film. Buddy nevertheless gives in to his own self-destructive nature, continuing to hurt his relationships with his family.

Eventually Buddy realizes how he has hurt his family and mends the relationships by giving the money Stan gave him from their mother's estate to his daughter Susan and performing at retirement homes and got the act right. The story ends with his brother giving him a painting he made of the two of them as children in their parents living room where they used to entertain the family on Shabbat.

== Cast ==
- Billy Crystal as Buddy Young Jr.
- David Paymer as Stan Young
- Julie Warner as Elaine Young
- Helen Hunt as Annie Wells
- Jerry Orbach as Phil Gussman
- Ron Silver as Larry Meyerson
- Mary Mara as Susan Young

=== Cameos ===
Comedians Jerry Lewis, Carl Ballantine, Slappy White, and Jackie Gayle appear in the New York Friars' Club scene.

== Production ==
=== Development ===
Billy Crystal first originated the character of Buddy Young Jr. for a 1984 HBO special, A Comic’s Line. On a 1985 episode of Saturday Night Live, he made an appearance as the character during a Weekend Update segment. "One night, the producer said, 'Johnny Cash, June Cash and Waylon Jennings are in the audience tonight — what if I put them near the Weekend Update desk?' I did [Buddy] live and I was like Don Rickles, I just had funny interplay with them. I had no idea what I was going to say. Live! And it was really funny. And then I knew I had something."

The opening title sequence was designed by Elaine Makatura Bass and Saul Bass.

== Reception ==
=== Critical reception ===
Mr. Saturday Night received mixed reviews from critics. It holds a 59% rating on Rotten Tomatoes based on 29 reviews with the consensus stating: "Billy Crystal's flawed directorial debut can't seem to decide whether it wants the viewer to love its protagonist or hate him, but it features fine work from Crystal and his co-stars". Audiences polled by CinemaScore gave the film an average grade of "A−" on an A+ to F scale.

=== Box office ===
Mr. Saturday Night was a box office bomb in the United States and Canada, grossing $13.3 million, less than a third of its budget. It grossed $23 million worldwide.

=== Awards and nominations ===
At the 65th Academy Awards, David Paymer was nominated for Best Supporting Actor (the film's only nomination). Billy Crystal also hosted the ceremony, and during his traditional Best Picture medley, he jokingly included the movie in the list, adding, "I just wanted to see how it feels, so sue me."

Award	Category	Nominee(s)	Result	Ref.
Academy Awards	Best Supporting Actor	David Paymer	Nominated	
American Comedy Awards	Funniest Actor in a Motion Picture (Leading Role)	Billy Crystal	Nominated	
Artios Awards	Outstanding Achievement in Feature Film Casting – Comedy	Pam Dixon	Nominated	
Chicago Film Critics Association Awards	Most Promising Actress	Julie Warner	Nominated	
Golden Globe Awards	Best Actor in a Motion Picture – Musical or Comedy	Billy Crystal	Nominated	
Golden Globe Awards	Best Supporting Actor – Motion Picture	David Paymer	Nominated	
Political Film Society Awards	Peace		Nominated	
Young Artist Awards	Best Young Actor Co-Starring in a Motion Picture	Jason Marsden	Nominated	

== Home media ==
The film was released twice on DVD, the first time on December 8, 1998, by PolyGram Video, and again on June 4, 2002, by MGM Home Entertainment.

== Stage adaptation ==
In 2021, the film was adapted into a Broadway musical, opening at the Nederlander Theatre in spring of 2022. Previews began on March 29, with the show opening on April 27. Crystal reprised his role as Buddy Young Jr., thirty years after creating the role on screen. Crystal, Ganz, and Mandel penned the book, reuniting the original screenplay team, and featured a score with music by Jason Robert Brown and lyrics by Amanda Green. Paymer also reprised his role as Stan. The Broadway cast also featured Randy Graff as Elaine, Shoshana Bean as Susan, and Chasten Harmon as Annie. The musical was directed by John Rando and choreographed by Ellenore Scott. At the 2022 Tony Awards, the musical was nominated for five awards, including Best Musical, Best Score, Best Book, Best Actor in a Musical for Crystal, and Best Featured Actress in a Musical for Bean. On July 17, 2022, the production announced its closing for September 4, 2022, after 28 previews and 116 performances.

== See also ==
- List of American films of 1992
- The Comic
