= A League of Their Own (1993 TV series) =

American television sitcom that aired on CBS

- Genre: Sitcom
- Created by: Lowell Ganz; Babaloo Mandel
- Directed by: Penny Marshall; Ted Bessell; Tom Hanks; Harvey Miller
- Starring: Sam McMurray; Carey Lowell; Christine Elise; Tracy Nelson; Megan Cavanagh; Tracy Reiner; Wendy Makkena; Katie Rich
- Composers: Jerry Abbott; Dick Marx
- Country of origin: United States
- Original language: English
- No. of seasons: 1
- No. of episodes: 6 (1 unaired)

Production
- Executive producers: Penny Marshall; Lowell Ganz; Babaloo Mandel; Elliot Abbott
- Running time: 30 minutes
- Production companies: Parkway Productions; TriStar Television

Original release
- Network: CBS
- Release: April 10 – August 13, 1993

A League of Their Own is an American television sitcom that aired on CBS from April 10 to 24, 1993, with two additional episodes aired on August 13, 1993; one episode out of the six produced went unaired. It was based on the 1992 movie of the same name and starred Sam McMurray. Only Megan Cavanagh, Tracy Reiner, Garry Marshall, Jon Lovitz, Pauline Brailsford and Freddie Simpson reprised their roles from the movie. David L. Lander, who was in the film, appears in one episode playing a different character.

== Premise ==
Jimmy Dugan is the coach of a team of female baseball players during World War II.

== Cast ==
- Sam McMurray as Coach Jimmy Dugan
- Carey Lowell as Dottie Hinson
- Christine Elise as Kit Keller
- Tracy Nelson as Evelyn Gardner
- Megan Cavanagh as Marla Hooch
- Tracy Reiner as Betty Horn
- Wendy Makkena as Mae Mordabito
- Katie Rich as Doris Murphy

== Episodes ==
No.	Title	Directed by	Written by	Original release date
1	"Dottie's Back"	Penny Marshall	Lowell Ganz & Babaloo Mandel	April 10, 1993
Dottie comes back to her team after her husband is called back into service.
2	"The Fat Boys of Summer"	Ted Bessell	Lowell Ganz & Babaloo Mandel	April 17, 1993
The girls challenge Jimmy's old teammates to a match.
3	"The Monkey's Curse"	Tom Hanks	Doug McIntyre	April 24, 1993
The team gets a chimpanzee as a new mascot.
4	"Drinking Problems"	Harvey Miller	Barry Rubinowitz	August 13, 1993
Jimmy and Dottie go on a date together after Jimmy is dumped and Dottie's husband forgets their anniversary.
5	"Marathon"	Ted Bessell	Alan Eisenstock & Larry Mintz	August 13, 1993
The team gets entered into a dance marathon.
6	"Shortstop"	Jeffrey Ganz	Alan Eisenstock & Larry Mintz	Unaired
Jimmy hires a new shortstop based on her looks.

== Home media ==
On June 16, 2020, the episodes "Dottie's Back", "Marathon", and the unaired episode "Shortstop" were released as bonuses on the 4K Ultra HD Blu-ray release of the 1992 film; as part of the Columbia Classics 4K Ultra HD Blu-ray Collection Volume 1.

== Reboot ==
On August 6, 2020, Amazon Prime Video gave a series order to reboot the television series.
