= Parenthood (1990 TV series) =

1990 American television series

- Genre: Sitcom
- Directed by: Alan Myerson; Betty Thomas; Allan Arkush; Matia Karrell
- Starring: Ed Begley Jr. Jayne Atkinson; Max Elliott Slade; William Windom; Sheila MacRae; Mary Jackson; Ken Ober; Susan Gayle Norman; Ivyann Schwan; Maryedith Burrell; David Arquette; Bess Meyer; Leonardo DiCaprio; Thora Birch; Zachary LaVoy
- Opening theme: "I Love to See You Smile" performed by Randy Newman
- Composer: Mason Daring
- Country of origin: United States
- Original language: English
- No. of seasons: 1
- No. of episodes: 12

Production
- Executive producers: Ron Howard; David Tyron King
- Producer: Sascha Schneider
- Editors: Joanne D'Antonio; Briana London
- Camera setup: Single-camera
- Running time: 30 minutes
- Production companies: Imagine Television; Universal Television

Original release
- Network: NBC
- Release: August 20, 1990 – August 11, 1991

Related
- Parenthood (1989 film); Parenthood (2010–2015)

Parenthood is an American sitcom television series based on the 1989 film. Executive produced by Ron Howard (who also co-wrote and directed the film), the series was produced by Imagine Television and Universal Television and aired for one season on NBC from August 20, 1990, to August 11, 1991.

Parenthood was one of many failed movie-to-TV adaptations in the 1990–91 season, also including Baby Talk on ABC's TGIF (a follow-up to Look Who's Talking), Ferris Bueller on NBC and Uncle Buck on CBS.

== Synopsis ==
The series delivered seriocomic vignettes on rearing children, revolving around four generations of a middle-class California family, the Buckmans (the movie took place in St. Louis, Missouri). The Huffners of the film were renamed the Merricks on the TV series.

The pilot episode was considered by USA Today and the New York Post as the best movie-to-TV spin-off since M*A*S*H. However, ratings for the series were low and Parenthood was canceled after 12 episodes.

The series is notable for featuring a number of people who at the time were unheard of but later became famous. One of the writers on the show was Joss Whedon. The cast featured Leonardo DiCaprio, David Arquette, and Thora Birch (billed simply as "Thora" here).

== Cast and characters ==
- Ed Begley Jr. as Gil Buckman (portrayed by Steve Martin in the film)
- Jayne Atkinson as Karen Buckman (portrayed by Mary Steenburgen in the film)
- Max Elliott Slade as Kevin Buckman (portrayed by Jasen Fisher in the film. He also portrayed Young Gil in the film)
- William Windom as Frank Buckman (portrayed by Jason Robards in the film)
- Sheila MacRae as Marilyn Buckman (portrayed by Eileen Ryan in the film)
- Mary Jackson as Great Grandma Greenwell (portrayed by Helen Shaw in the film)
- Ken Ober as Nathan Merrick (portrayed by Rick Moranis in the film)
- Susan Gayle Norman as Susan Buckman Merrick (portrayed by Harley Jane Kozak in the film)
- Ivyann Schwan as Patty Merrick (reprising her role from the film)
- Maryedith Burrell as Helen Buckman Lampkin (portrayed by Dianne Wiest in the film)
- David Arquette as Tod Hawks (portrayed by Keanu Reeves in the film)
- Bess Meyer as Julie Lampkin Hawks (portrayed by Martha Plimpton in the film)
- Leonardo DiCaprio as Garry Lampkin (portrayed by Joaquin Phoenix in the film)
- Thora Birch as Taylor Buckman (portrayed by Alisan Porter in the film)
- Zachary LaVoy as Justin Buckman (reprising his role from the film)
- Alex Burrall as Cool Buckman (reprising his role from the film)

== Episodes ==
No.	Title	Directed by	Written by	Original release date	Prod. code
1	"Pilot"	Allan Arkush	Lowell Ganz, Babaloo Mandel	August 20, 1990	101
2	"My Dad Can Beat Up Your BMW"	Allan Arkush	David Tyron King	September 22, 1990	102
3	"The Plague"	Alan Myerson	Joss Whedon	September 29, 1990	103
4	"I Never Invested for My Father"	Betty Thomas	David Tyron King	October 6, 1990	104
5	"Love Stinks"	Allan Arkush	Russ Woody	October 13, 1990	105
6	"Cars & Cards"	Alan Myerson	Glen Merzer	October 20, 1990	106
7	"Hollow Halloween"	Allan Arkush	Jerry Lacy	October 27, 1990	107
8	"Small Surprises"	Matia Karrell	Joss Whedon	November 3, 1990	108
9	"Take My Parents, Please"	Allan Arkush	Russ Woody	November 10, 1990	109
10	"Thanksgiving with a T that Rhymes with B that Stands for Basketball"	Betty Thomas	David Tyron King	November 17, 1990	110
11	"Gil vs. the Deck"	Matia Karrell	Allison M. Gibson	December 16, 1990	111
12	"Fun for Kids"	Allan Arkush	David Tyron King, Joss Whedon	August 11, 1991	112

== Syndication ==
The show was featured on the now-defunct cable network Trio in 2005 as part of their "Brilliant But Cancelled" series of shows that were canceled before their time.

== New series ==
A new television adaptation of the movie premiered on NBC in March 2010 and ran until January 2015. Craig T. Nelson and Bonnie Bedelia played the parental roles, joined by Peter Krause, Lauren Graham, Erika Christensen, Dax Shepard and Monica Potter.
