= 11th Youth in Film Awards =

1990 US media awards ceremony

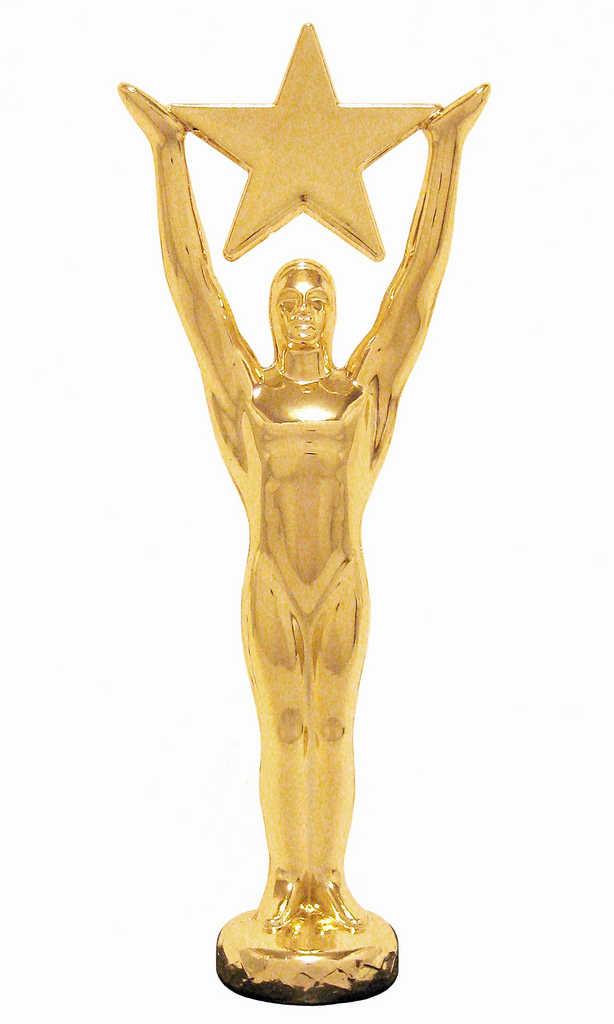
- Awarded for: Achievement in the 1988—1989 season
- Date: March or April 1990 (exact date unknown)
- Site: Hollywood, California
- Hosted by: Sean Astin

The 11th Youth in Film Awards ceremony (now known as the Young Artist Award), presented by the Youth in Film Association, honored outstanding youth performers under the age of 21 in the fields of film and television for the 1988–1989 season, and took place in the spring of 1990 in Hollywood, California.

Established in 1978 by long-standing Hollywood Foreign Press Association member, Maureen Dragone, the Youth in Film Association was the first organization to establish an awards ceremony specifically set to recognize and award the contributions of performers under the age of 21 in the fields of film, television, theater and music.

== Categories ==
★ Bold indicates the winner in each category.

== Best Young Performer in a Motion Picture ==
=== Best Young Actor Starring in a Motion Picture ===
★ Sean Astin – Staying Together (Hemdale Film Corporation) as Duncan McDermott

- Kirk Cameron – Listen to Me (Columbia Pictures) as Tucker Muldowney
- Joel Carlson – Communion (New Line Cinema) as Andrew Strieber
- Keith Coogan – Cheetah (Walt Disney Pictures) as Ted Johnson
- Cory Danziger – The 'Burbs (Universal Studios) as Dave Peterson
- Joshua Miller – Teen Witch (M.G.M.) as Richie Miller
- Leaf Phoenix – Parenthood (Universal Pictures) as Garry
- Jared Rushton – Honey, I Shrunk the Kids (Walt Disney Pictures) as Ronald "Ron" Thompson
- Fred Savage – The Wizard (Universal Pictures) as Corey Woods
- Ben Savage – Little Monsters (Vestron Pictures) as Eric Stevenson

=== Best Young Actress Starring in a Motion Picture ===
★ Winona Ryder – Great Balls of Fire! (Orion Pictures) as Myra Gale Brown

- Blaze Berdahl – Pet Sematary (Paramount Pictures) as Ellen "Ellie" Creed
- Rebecca Harrell – Prancer (Orion Pictures) as Jessica Riggs
- Jenny Lewis – The Wizard (Universal Pictures) as Haley Brooks
- Robyn Lively – Teen Witch (M.G.M.) as Louise Miller
- Sarah Polley – The Adventures of Baron Munchausen (Columbia Pictures) as Sally Salt

=== Best Young Actor Supporting Role in a Motion Picture ===
★ Hugh O'Conor – My Left Foot (Miramax Films) as Young Christy Brown

- Kevin Dillon – Immediate Family (Columbia Pictures) as Sam
- Luke Edwards – The Wizard (Universal Pictures) as Jimmy "The Wizard" Woods
- Jasen Fisher – Parenthood (Universal Pictures) as Kevin
- Lukas Haas – Music Box (TriStar Pictures) as Mikey Talbot
- Ethan Hawke – Dad (Universal Pictures) as Billy Tremont
- Jermaine Hopkins – Lean on Me (Warner Bros) as Thomas Sams
- Gabriel Damon – Tequila Sunrise (Warner Bros) as Cody McKussic
- Whitby Hertford – A Nightmare on Elm Street 5: The Dream Child (New Line Cinema) as Jacob Johnson

=== Best Young Actress Supporting Role in a Motion Picture ===
★ Gaby Hoffmann – Field of Dreams (Universal Studios) as Karin Kinsella

- Ariana Richards – Prancer (Orion Pictures) as Carol Wetherby
- Sarah Rowland Doroff – Three Fugitives (Touchstone Pictures) as Megan "Meg" Perry
- Karen Malina White – Lean on Me (Warner Bros) as Kaneesha Carter
- Amy O'Neill – Honey, I Shrunk the Kids (Walt Disney Pictures) as Amy Szalinski
- Kala Savage – Little Monsters (Vestron Pictures) as Little Monster

== Best Young Performer in a TV Movie, Pilot or Special ==
=== Best Young Actor Starring in a TV Movie, Pilot or Special ===
★ Brian Austin Green – Adventures in Babysitting (Walt Disney Television) as Daryl Coopersmith

- Brian Bonsall – Do You Know the Muffin Man? (CBS) as Teddy Dollison
- Kevin Dillon – When He's Not a Stranger (CBS) as Rick
- Cory Danziger – Married to the Mob (Orion Pictures) as Nick Russo
- Stephen Dorff – Do You Know the Muffin Man? as Sandy Dollison (CBS)
- Brandon Quintin Adams – Polly (NBC) as Jimmy Bean
- Corin Nemec – I Know My First Name Is Steven (NBC) as Steven Stayner/Dennis Parnell
- Jacob Vargas – Hard Time on Planet Earth (CBS) as Billy
- Joey Lawrence – Adventures in Babysitting (Walt Disney Television) as Brad Anderson
- Lantz Landry – No Place Like Home (CBS) as David Cooper

=== Best Young Actress Starring in a TV Movie, Pilot or Special ===
★ Juliet Sorcey – Taken Away (CBS) as Abby Monroe

- Annabeth Gish – When He's Not a Stranger (CBS) as Lyn McKenna
- Amy Lynne – Private Affairs (CBS) as Lindy
- Keshia Knight Pulliam – Polly (NBC) as Polly
- Emily Schulman – Caddie Woodlawn (Churchill Films) as Caddie Woodlawn

== Best Young Performer in a Television Series ==
=== Best Young Actor Starring in a Television Series ===
★ Neil Patrick Harris – Doogie Howser, M.D. (ABC) as Dr. Douglas "Doogie" Howser

- Danny Ponce – The Hogan Family (ABC) as Willie Hogan
- Darius McCrary – Family Matters (ABC) as Edward "Eddie" Winslow
- Vonni Ribisi – My Two Dads (NBC) as Cory Kupkus
- David Faustino – Married... with Children (FOX) as Bud Bundy
- Fred Savage – The Wonder Years (ABC) as Kevin Arnold
- Matthew Newmark – Paradise (CBS) as Joseph Carroll
- Jason Hervey – The Wonder Years (ABC) as Wayne Arnold
- Jeremy Licht – The Hogan Family (NBC) as Mark Hogan
- Jeremy Miller – Growing Pains (ABC) as Benjamin Hubert Horatio Humphrey "Ben" Seaver
- Danny Pintauro – Who's the Boss? (ABC) as Jonathan Bower

=== Best Young Actress Starring in a Television Series ===
★ Jodie Sweetin – Full House (ABC) as Stephanie Tanner

- Candace Cameron – Full House (ABC) as D.J. Tanner
- Alyson Hannigan – Free Spirit (ABC) as Jessie Harper
- Chelsea Hertford – Major Dad (CBS) as Casey Cooper MacGillis
- Staci Keanan – My Two Dads (NBC) as Nicole Bradford
- Lisa Rieffel – Ann Jillian (NBC) as Lucy McNeil
- Danica McKellar – The Wonder Years (ABC) as Gwendolyn "Winnie" Cooper
- Jenny Beck – Paradise (CBS) as Claire Carroll

=== Best Young Actor Supporting Role in a Television Series ===
★ Malcolm-Jamal Warner – The Cosby Show (NBC) as Theodore Huxtable

- Brandon Call – Baywatch (NBC) as Hobie Buchannon
- Kevin Telles – Life Goes On (ABC) as Pederson
- Luke Rossi – Thirtysomething (ABC) as Ethan Weston
- Paul Scherrer – Free Spirit as (ABC) as Robb Harper
- Harley Cross – Sister Kate (NBC) as Eugene Colodner
- Tommy Puett – Life Goes On (ABC) as Tyler Benchfield
- Jeff Bollow – Ann Jillian (NBC) as Jeff
- Jason Priestley – Sister Kate (NBC) as Tod Mahaffey
- Michael Faustino – HeartBeat (ABC) as Nicky Rosetti

=== Best Young Actress Supporting Role in a Television Series ===
★ Andrea Barber – Full House (ABC) as Kimmy Gibbler

- Amy Hathaway – My Two Dads (NBC) as Shelby Haskell
- Sara Gilbert – Roseanne (ABC) as Darlene Conner
- Lauren Woodland – Alien Nation (FOX) as Emily Francisco
- Tempestt Bledsoe – The Cosby Show (NBC) as Vanessa Huxtable
- Kellie Martin – Life Goes On (ABC) as Rebecca "Becca" Thatcher
- Lecy Goranson – Roseanne (ABC) as Becky Conner-Healy
- Heidi Zeigler – Just the Ten of Us (ABC) as Sherry Lubbock

=== Best Young Actor Guest Starring in a Television Series ===
★ Randy Josselyn – Family Matters (ABC) as Rodney Beckett

- Mark Ballou – Paradise (CBS) as Bo Ivey
- Michael John Burns – Paradise (CBS) as Tommy
- Justin Burnette – Who's the Boss? (ABC) as Brandon
- Scott Ferguson – Mancuso, F.B.I. (NBC)
- Jason Horst – It's Garry Shandling's Show (Showtime) as Steve
- Cuba Gooding, Jr. – MacGyver (ABC) as Billy Colton
- Kenny Morrison – Growing Pains (ABC) as Vito Paducci
- Ryan Bollman – Life Goes On (ABC) as Lester Fitchman
- John Chaidez – General Hospital (ABC)
- Michael Bacall – Doogie Howser, M.D. (ABC) as Kevin Walters
- Michael Bays – Life Goes On (ABC) as Vincent Shenck
- Brandon Stewart – The Judge (Syn.)
- Bobby Jacoby – The Wonder Years (ABC) as Walter
- Joshua Miller – The Wonder Years (ABC) as Larry Beeman

=== Best Young Actress Guest Starring in a Television Series ===
★ Solaz – The Judge (Syn.)

- Mayim Bialik – Empty Nest (NBC) as Laurie Kincaid
- Deonca Brown – Superior Court (Warner Bros. Television)
- Holly Fields – MacGyver (ABC) as Jennifer Reiner/Crystal
- Karen Lundy – Midnight Caller (NBC) as Molly Rayfield
- Crystal McKellar – Paradise (CBS) as Kathleen
- Juliet Sorcey- Wolf (CBS) as Carrie

=== Best Young Actor in an Off-Prime Time Family Series ===
★ Scott Nemes – It's Garry Shandling's Show (Showtime) as Grant Schumaker

- Dustin Diamond – Saved by the Bell (NBC) as Samuel "Screech" Powers
- Alexander Polinsky – Charles in Charge (Syndication) as Adam Powell
- Jason Marsden – The Munsters Today (Syndication) as Edward "Eddie" Wolfgang Munster
- Will Nipper – The New Lassie (Syndication) as Will McCullough
- Jerry O'Connell – My Secret Identity (CTV) as Andrew Clements
- Kevin Osgood – MMC (Disney Channel) as Self
- Damon Pampolina – MMC (Disney Channel) as Self
- John Snee – The New Leave It to Beaver (WTBS) as Oliver "Ollie" Cleaver
- Wil Wheaton – Star Trek: The Next Generation (Syndication) as Wesley Crusher

=== Best Young Actress in an Off-Prime Time Family Series ===
★ Lark Voorhies – Saved by the Bell (NBC) as Lisa Turtle

- Tiffany Brissette – Small Wonder (FOX TV) as Victoria "Vicki" Ann Smith-Lawson
- Wendy Cox – The New Lassie (Syndication) as Megan McCullough
- Josie Davis – Charles in Charge (Syndication) as Sarah Powell
- Nicole Eggert – Charles in Charge (Syndication) as Jamie Powell
- Maureen Flannigan – Out of This World (Syndication) as Evie Ethel Garland
- Hilary Van Dyke – The Munsters Today (Syndication) as Marilyn Munster

=== Best Young Actor in a Daytime Drama ===
★ R. J. Williams – General Hospital (ABC) as Rowdy

- Michael Bays – Days of Our Lives (NBC) as Julio Ramirez
- Justin Gocke – Santa Barbara (NBC) as Brandon Capwell
- Ryan Brennan – Days of Our Lives (NBC) as Max Brady

=== Best Young Actress in a Daytime Drama ===
★ Ashley Peldon – Guiding Light (CBS) as Marah Lewis

- Kimberly McCullough – General Hospital (ABC) as Robin Scorpio
- Christie Clark – Days of Our Lives (NBC) as Carrie Brady
- Mindy Clarke – Days of Our Lives (NBC) as Faith Taylor
- Julie Condra – Santa Barbara (NBC) as Emily DiNapoli Hughes

== Best Young Performer Under 9 Years of Age ==
=== Outstanding Performance by an Actor Under 9 Years of Age ===
★ Brian Bonsall – Family Ties (NBC) as Andrew "Andy" Keaton

- Michael Patrick Carter – Paradise (CBS) as George Carroll
- Miko Hughes – Pet Sematary (Paramount Pictures) as Gage Creed
- Zachary LaVoy – Parenthood (Universal Pictures) as Justin Buckman
- Tony T. Johnson – Amen (NBC) as Chris

=== Outstanding Performance by an Actress Under 9 Years of Age ===
★ Mary-Kate and Ashley Olsen – Full House (ABC) as Michelle Tanner

- Nicole Alysia – Sidewalk Stories (Island Pictures) as Child
- Brighton Hertford – General Hospital (ABC) as Barbara Jean 'B.J.' Jones
- Raven-Symoné – The Cosby Show (NBC) as Olivia Kendall
- Thora – Day by Day (NBC) as Molly

== Best Young Ensemble Cast ==
=== Outstanding Young Ensemble Cast ===
★ A Mother's Courage: The Mary Thomas Story (NBC) – Garland Spencer as Isaiah Thomas (Middle School), A.J. Johnson as Ruby Thomas, Leon as Michael Thomas, T. C. Carson, Dwain Perry, Nathaniel Barnes as Mark Thomas, Robert Bady, Shamon Ricks as Jojo and Larry O. Williams as Isaiah Thomas (High School)

- Homeroom (ABC) – Billy Dee Willis as Donald, Daphne Lyn Jones as Lisa Forest, Trent Cameron as Sam and Jahary Bennett as Devon
- Kids Incorporated (Disney) – Love Hewitt, Sean O'Riordan, Stacy Ferguson, Kenny Ford, Devyn Puett and Richard Shoff
- Saved by the Bell (NBC) – Mark-Paul Gosselaar as Zachary "Zack" Morris, Mario Lopez as Albert Clifford "A.C." Slater, Dustin Diamond as Samuel "Screech" Powers, Tiffani-Amber Thiessen as Kelly Kapowski, Elizabeth Berkley as Jessica "Jessie" Spano and Lark Voorhies as Lisa Turtle
- Degrassi Junior High (CBC Television) – Dayo Ade as Bryant Lester "B.L.T." Thomas, Sara Ballingall as Melanie Brodie, Stefan Brogren as Archie "Snake" Simpson, Michael Carry as Simon Dexter, Christopher Charlesworth as Scott "Scooter" Webster, Amanda Cook as Lorraine "L.D." Delacorte, Irene Courakos as Alexa Pappadopoulos, Angela Deiseach as Erica Farrell, Anais Granofsky as Lucy Fernandez, Rebecca Haines as Kathleen Mead, Neil Hope as Derek "Wheels" Wheeler, Cathy Keenan as Liz O'Rourke, Pat Mastroianni as Joey Jeremiah, Maureen McKay as Michelle Accette, Stacie Mistysyn as Caitlin Ryan, Bill Parrott as Shane McKay, Siluck Saysanasy as Yick Yu, Amanda Stepto as Christine "Spike" Nelson and Duncan Waugh as Arthur Kobalewscuy
- The Wonder Years (ABC) – Fred Savage as Kevin Arnold, Josh Saviano as Paul Joshua Pfeiffer, Danica McKellar as Gwendolyn "Winnie" Cooper, Jason Hervey as Wayne Arnold, and Michael Tricario as Randy Mitchell

== Best Family Television Entertainment ==
=== Best Family TV Movie Pilot or Special ===
★ I Know My First Name Is Steven (NBC)

- Free to Be... A Family (Landmark)
- CBS Schoolbreak Special – Frog Girl: The Jenifer Graham Story (CBS)
- No Place Like Home (Orion Television)
- When He's Not a Stranger (CBS)

=== Best New Television Series ===
★ Major Dad (CBS)

- Ann Jillian (NBC)
- Baywatch (NBC)
- Doogie Howser, M.D. (ABC)
- Family Matters (ABC)
- Free Spirit (ABC)
- Life Goes On (ABC)
- Sister Kate (NBC)

=== Best Off-Prime Time Family Series ===
★ Out of This World

- Charles in Charge (Syn.)
- The New Lassie (Syn.)
- The Munsters Today (Syn.)
- The New Leave It to Beaver (TBS)
- Saved by the Bell (NBC)
- Star Trek: The Next Generation (Syn.)
- Superboy (Syn.)
- My Secret Identity (CTV/Syn.)

== Best Family Motion Picture Entertainment ==
=== Best Family Motion Picture: Adventure or Cartoon ===
★ The Little Mermaid (Disney)

- All Dogs Go to Heaven (MGM – UA)
- The Adventures of Milo and Otis (Columbia)
- Babar: The Movie (New Line Cinema)
- The Bear (Tri – Star)

=== Best Family Motion Picture: Musical or Fantasy ===
★ Back to the Future Part II (Universal)

- The Adventures of Baron von Munchausen (Columbia)
- The Abyss (20th Century Fox)
- Batman (Warner Bros.)

=== Best Family Motion Picture: Comedy ===
★ Parenthood (Universal)

- Ghostbusters II (Columbia)
- Honey, I Shrunk the Kids (Buena Vista)
- Look Who's Talking (Tri-Star)
- The Wizard (Universal)
- Turner & Hooch (Buena Vista)

=== Best Motion Picture: Drama ===
★ Dead Poets Society (Touchstone)

- Dad (Universal)
- Immediate Family (Columbia)
- Lean on Me (Warner Bros.)
- My Left Foot (Miramax)
- Indiana Jones and the Last Crusade (Paramount)

== Youth In Film's Special Awards ==
=== Former Child Star – Life Achievement Award ===
★ Jon Provost – Lassie as Timmy Martin/Timmy Claussen

★ Margaret O'Brien – Journey for Margaret as Margaret White

=== The Michael Landon Award ===
==== Outstanding Contribution to Youth through Television ====
★ Donna Metroff, Producer – WonderWorks PBS

=== The Jackie Coogan Award ===
==== Outstanding Contribution to Youth through Motion Pictures ====
★ Norman Twain, Producer – Lean on Me

=== Inspiration to Youth ===
★ Christopher Burke – Life Goes On as Charles "Corky" Thatcher

=== Best Young Actor Under 9 Appearing in a Foreign Film ===
★ Salvatore Cascio (Italy) – Cinema Paradiso as Salvatore Di Vita

=== Outstanding Young Actor in a Foreign Film ===
★ Max Rennie (England) – When the Whales Came as Daniel Pender

=== Outstanding Young Actress in a Foreign Film ===
★ Helen Pearce (England) – When the Whales Came as Gracie Jenkins

=== Best Foreign Film ===
★ When the Whales Came (England)
