= Zachary LaVoy =

American former child actor

- Born: Zachary LaVoy; Illinois, United States
- Occupation: Former child actor
- Years active: 1989–1991
- Known for: Parenthood (1989 film and 1990–1991 TV series)
- Notable work: Parenthood

Zachary LaVoy (sometimes credited as La Voy) is an American former child actor; best known for portraying Justin Buckman in both the 1989 film Parenthood and its NBC 1990 television spin-off of the same name.

== Career ==
LaVoy was born in Illinois. He first starred in Ron Howard's 1989 film Parenthood as Steve Martin and Mary Steenburgen's youngest son Justin Buckman. His subsequent appearance on The Tonight Show with Johnny Carson at age 3 became a retrospect highlight for the show. Director Ron Howard recalled how he would keep the three-year-old's energy level high by holding him upside down during takes; which ended up becoming the defining image for the Parenthood poster. After appearing on ABC's Who's the Boss, LaVoy reprised his role of Justin Buckman on the NBC television sitcom spinoff produced by Howard; which aired from August 20, 1990, to August 11, 1991.

In 1990, LaVoy was nominated for a Young Artist Award (then Youth in Films Award) for Outstanding Performance by an Actor Under Nine Years of Age. The award went to his co-star Leaf Phoenix.

LaVoy retired from acting in 1991. In 2012, he appeared as himself in a YouTube documentary parody entitled: Child Actors: Hollywood's Punching Bags; which detailed the rise and fall of his acting career from "hitting rock bottom, redemption via Spaghetti Monster and living in his mother's basement."

In a 2013 interview, LaVoy commented: "I have never really been recognized because as I've grown up. Obviously I've gotten bigger; and I'm not that cute little cherub anymore. Looking at Jasen Fisher, looking at Ivy, looking at Alisan Porter, they all look the same. I think with me – I don't think I look the same. But apparently everyone says I do; so who am I to argue?"

== Filmography ==
Year	Title	Role	Notes
1989	Parenthood	Justin	Film
1991	Who's the Boss	Patrick	TV series
1990-1991	Parenthood	Justin Buckman	TV series

== YouTube ==
Year	Title	Role	Notes
2013	Mr. Mendo's Hack Attack	The Cinema Snob	YouTube series
2016	Nostalgia Critic	as Zachary LaVoy	YouTube series
2016	Jesus, Bro!	as Zachary LaVoy	YouTube series
2021	Another Cinema Snob Movie	as Zachary LaVoy	YouTube series
