= The Lowbrow Reader =

The Lowbrow Reader is a comedy zine from New York City. It was established in 2001 by its editor, Jay Ruttenberg, and designer, Matthew Berube. In 2012, Drag City published a Lowbrow Reader book anthology, The Lowbrow Reader Reader.

The Lowbrow Reader first published in New York in 2001, spotlighting comedians often considered “lowbrow,” including Adam Sandler, Joan Rivers, Gilbert Gottfried, and Mo'Nique. Writing in the New York Times, Dwight Garner called the publication, “a smart little journal about what’s sometimes perceived as dumb humor.” Contributors to the zine have included David Berman, Shelley Berman, Drew Friedman, Gilbert Gottfried, Neil Hagerty, Lee Hazlewood, Amy Heckerling, Rick Moranis, Taylor Negron, Gilbert Rogin, and George Saunders. Its coverage of Rogin, by Jay Jennings, led to the reissues of Rogins’s two novels.

The Lowbrow Reader’s book anthology, The Lowbrow Reader Reader, was published in 2012 by Drag City, featuring work from the first eight issues. The book received praise from the New York Times, Entertainment Weekly, Politico, the Chicago Tribune, and Vulture.

The Lowbrow Reader’s live events have featured performances by Wyatt Cenac, the Fiery Furnaces, Adam Green, and John Mulaney.
