= Nick Coppola =

American film and television producer

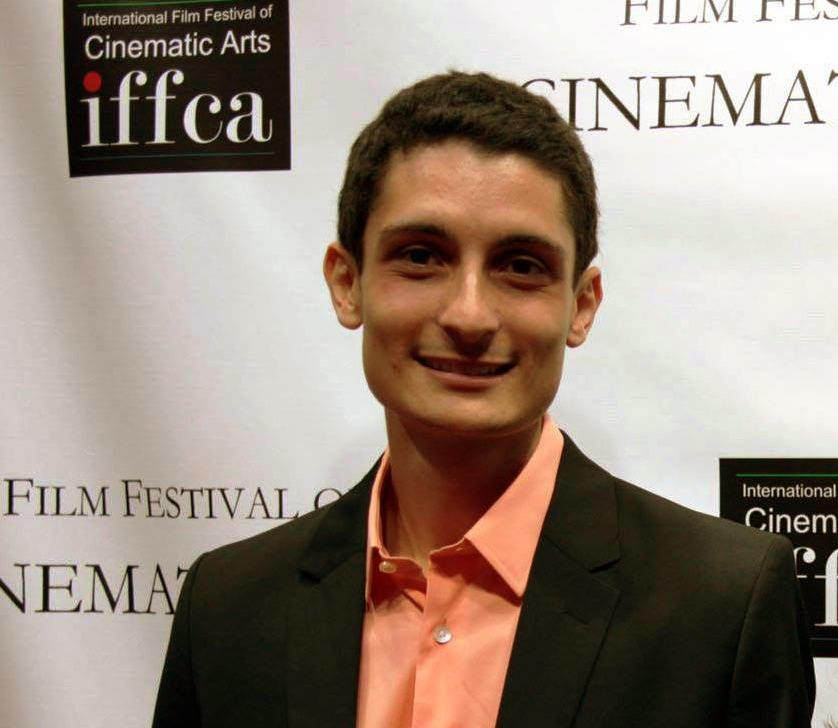
- Born: 1994 (age 31–32); Long Branch, New Jersey
- Occupation: Film/Television producer
- Years active: 2012-present

Nick Coppola is an American film and television producer. He is best known for his short-subject film Mirror. His most recent collaborations on films have won awards at SXSW, 21st Savannah International Film Festival, WorldFest Houston Film Festival along with a nomination for a Golden Space Needle at the 45th Seattle International Film Festival.

Nick Coppola was born in Long Branch, New Jersey. Beginning at the early age of 18, after graduating high school, he found great interest in cinema after working on a Cinemax production. He later pursued his studies at The Los Angeles Film School in Hollywood. He quickly began learning under Michèle Ohayon and Matia Karrell early in his career. He enjoys producing and occasionally directing.
