= Scuba Duba =

1967 off-Broadway comedy play

- Written by: Bruce Jay Friedman
- Original language: English
- Genre: Comedy

Premiere
- Date premiered: October 10, 1967
- Place premiered: New Theatre, New York

Scuba Duba is a 1967 comedy play from Bruce Jay Friedman which was a success off-Broadway starring Jerry Orbach, Judd Hirsch, Conrad Bain and Cleavon Little in a production that ran for 692 performances.

The play was profiled in the William Goldman book The Season: A Candid Look at Broadway.

Although the play did not run on Broadway, it had a second well received run in 1971 at the Studio Arena Theater in Buffalo starring F. Murray Abraham, John Newton, and Eve McVeagh.

== Original production ==
The show premiered on October 10, 1967, at the New Theatre in New York City. The setting for the play is a cháteau in the South of France (designed by set designer Peter Larkin) where an American family of three is visiting. The show can be summarized as a tense comedy as the husband discovers that his wife has left him for skin-diver there, and he and his daughter are dealing with the issue.

== Film version ==
In 1968, Warner Brothers-Seven Arts paid Bruce Jay Friedman $150,000 upfront for the film rights, along five percent of gross revenue after the film recoups 2.7 times the cost of the film negative (film production costs). Although there was an agreement for the film rights, Warner Brothers-Seven Arts never made the film. However, several of thestories by Bruce Jay Friedman would later became a variety of motion pictures, one example being Splash (1984).
