= Lydia Rapoport =

American social worker and educator

- Born: March 8, 1923; Vienna, Austria
- Died: September 6, 1971 (aged 48); New York City, U.S.
- Education: Hunter College (BA); Smith College School for Social Work
- Occupations: Social worker; educator
- Employer: University of California, Berkeley
- Known for: Contributions to crisis theory; development of crisis intervention models

Lydia Rapoport (March 8, 1923 – September 6, 1971) was an American social worker and educator. Her contribution to crisis theory shaped treatment methodologies.

== Early life and education ==
Lydia Rappoport (Note: Lydia changed the spelling of her last name from Rappoport to Rapoport.) was born in Vienna, Austria on March 8, 1923, to Eugenia Margulies and Samuel Rappoport. Her father emigrated to New York City in 1928, in part due to "increased antisemitism and resurgent German nationalism." Lydia stayed in Vienna with her mother and brother in Vienna while he finished high school, staying until 1932.

Rapoport attended public schools in New York City. At the age of 19 she earned a bachelor's degree in sociology from Hunter College, where she was Phi Beta Kappa. Following an accelerated graduate course, she earned her master's degree from the Smith College School for Social Work at 21 in 1944. She studied at the Harvard School of Public Health in 1959-1960 under Eric Lindemann and Gerald Caplan.

After doing casework, working with children and at the Michael Reese Hospital in Chicago, Rapoport earned a certificate in child therapy from the Chicago Institute of Psychoanalysis. She was an intake supervisor at the Child Guidance Clinic of the University of Chicago and a supervisor at the Jewish Children's Bureau. As a counselor at the Institute for Juvenile Research, she diagnosed and treated children with emotional issues. Rapoport won a Fulbright scholarship in 1952 and continued her studies at the London School of Economics.

== Career ==
Rapoport moved to California to be near her brother, in 1954. She began her associates with University of California, Berkeley as a field supervisor for their students before becoming a faculty member a year later and full professor in 1969. In 1969, she established the Community Mental Health Training Program at their School of Social Welfare. She became an inter-regional adviser on family welfare and family planning for the United Nations in January 1971.

Her work is "an integral part of the foundation of current crisis intervention and crisis-oriented brief therapy. She identified the goals of crisis intervention: relief of symptoms, restoration of precrisis functioning, understanding of precipitants, and identification of remedial measures. This model continues in use today."

Rapoport died on September 6, 1971, in New York City of acute bacterial endocarditis.

== Publications ==
- Working with Families in Crisis: An Exploration in Preventive Intervention
