= A League of Their Own =

1992 film by Penny Marshall

- Theatrical release poster
- Directed by: Penny Marshall
- Screenplay by: Lowell Ganz; Babaloo Mandel
- Story by: Kelly Candaele; Kim Wilson
- Produced by: Elliot Abbott; Robert Greenhut
- Starring: Tom Hanks; Geena Davis; Madonna; Lori Petty; Rosie O'Donnell; David Strathairn; Garry Marshall; Bill Pullman
- Cinematography: Miroslav Ondříček
- Edited by: George Bowers
- Music by: Hans Zimmer
- Production company: Parkway Productions
- Distributed by: Columbia Pictures
- Release date: July 1, 1992
- Running time: 128 minutes
- Country: United States
- Language: English
- Budget: $40 million
- Box office: $132.4 million

A League of Their Own is a 1992 American sports comedy drama film directed by Penny Marshall that tells a fictionalized account of the real-life All-American Girls Professional Baseball League (AAGPBL). It stars Tom Hanks, Geena Davis, Madonna, Lori Petty, Rosie O'Donnell, Jon Lovitz, David Strathairn, Garry Marshall, and Bill Pullman and was written by Lowell Ganz and Babaloo Mandel from a story by Kelly Candaele and Kim Wilson.

A League of Their Own was released by Columbia Pictures on July 1, 1992. It was a critical and commercial success, grossing $132.4 million worldwide and garnering acclaim for Marshall's direction and the performances of its ensemble cast. In 2012, the Library of Congress selected it for preservation in the United States National Film Registry as "culturally, historically, or aesthetically significant."

== Plot ==
In 1988, Dottie Hinson attends the opening of the All-American Girls Professional Baseball League exhibit at the Baseball Hall of Fame. She sees many former teammates and friends playing a game, prompting a flashback to 1943.

With World War II threatening to shut down Major League Baseball (MLB), Chicago Cubs owner Walter Harvey persuades his fellow owners to bankroll a women's league. Ira Lowenstein is put in charge. Scout Ernie Capadino attends an industrial-league softball game in Oregon and likes what he sees in Dottie, the catcher for a local dairy. She is not interested and is happy with her life, waiting for her husband Bob to return from the war. Her younger sister, Kit Keller, however, is desperate to escape and make something of herself. Capadino is unimpressed by Kit's batting and refuses to watch her pitch but agrees to take her along if she changes Dottie's mind. Dottie agrees for her sister's sake.

Dottie and Kit travel to Harvey Field (a fictionalized Wrigley Field) in Chicago for tryouts; en route, they force Capadino to accept homely second baseman Marla Hooch. They meet taxi dancer Mae "All-the-Way-Mae" Mordabito, her best friend, bouncer Doris Murphy, soft-spoken right fielder Evelyn Gardner, illiterate left fielder Shirley Baker, pitcher/shortstop and former Miss Georgia beauty queen Ellen Sue Gotlander, left field/relief pitcher Betty "Spaghetti" Horn, first baseman Helen Haley and Alice "Skeeter" Gaspers. They and five others constitute the Rockford Peaches, while 48 others make up the Racine Belles, the Kenosha Comets and the South Bend Blue Sox.

The Peaches are managed by former star Cubs slugger Jimmy Dugan, a cynical alcoholic. He initially treats the whole concept as a joke, forcing Dottie to take over as on-field leader. Dugan is also abrasive toward his players. The team travels with Evelyn's spoiled, bratty son Stillwell and team chaperone Miss Cuthburt. With a Life magazine photographer in the stands, Lowenstein begs the players to do something spectacular, as the league has attracted little attention. Dottie obliges, catching a popped-up ball behind home plate while doing a split. The resulting photograph makes the magazine cover. A publicity campaign draws more people to the ballgames, but the owners remain unconvinced.

The teammates bond. Marla marries a man named Nelson whom she met on a raucous roadhouse outing and leaves the team for the rest of the season, Mae teaches Shirley to read, and Evelyn writes a team song. Lowenstein promotes Dottie as the face of the league, making Kit resentful. Their sibling rivalry intensifies, resulting in Kit's trade to the Racine Belles.

The Peaches end the season with the league's best record, qualifying for the World Series. Betty receives a telegram, informing her that her husband was killed in action in the Pacific Theater. Grief-stricken, she leaves the team. That evening, Dottie receives a surprise when Bob shows up, having been wounded and discharged from the Army. Jimmy discovers that Dottie is going home with Bob. Unable to persuade her to play in the World Series, he tells her she will regret her decision.

The Peaches face the Belles in the World Series, which goes the full seven games. Dottie rejoins the Peaches for the seventh game, while Kit is the starting pitcher for the Belles. With the Belles leading by a run in the top of the ninth, Dottie drives in the go-ahead run. Kit is distraught, but gets a second chance when she comes to bat with two outs in the bottom of the ninth. She gets a hit and, ignoring the third base coach's sign to stop, collides with Dottie at the plate and causes her to drop the ball, thus scoring the winning run.

The sellout crowd convinces Harvey to give Lowenstein the owners' support. After the game, the sisters reconcile before Dottie leaves with Bob.

Back in the present at Cooperstown, Dottie is reunited with the other players – including Kit – Capadino and Lowenstein, and reveals that Bob died the previous winter. She also discovers that Jimmy died a year earlier, in 1987, and she meets a grown up Stillwell, who tells her that Evelyn died a couple years earlier. The surviving Peaches sing Evelyn's team song and pose for a photo. During the closing credits, they play baseball once again at Doubleday Field.

== Cast ==
=== Rockford Peaches ===
- Tom Hanks as Jimmy Dugan (manager)
- Geena Davis as Dorothy "Dottie" Hinson (#8, catcher/assistant manager)
  - Lynn Cartwright as Older Dottie
- Madonna as "All the Way" Mae Mordabito (#5, center field)
  - Eunice Anderson as Older Mae
- Lori Petty as Kit Keller (#23, pitcher)
  - Kathleen Butler as Older Kit
- Rosie O'Donnell as Doris Murphy (#22, third base)
  - Vera Johnson as Older Doris
- Anne Ramsay as Helen Haley (#15, first base)
  - Barbara Pilavin as Older Helen
- Megan Cavanagh as Marla Hooch (#32, second base)
  - Patricia Wilson as Older Marla
- Freddie Simpson as Ellen Sue Gotlander (#1, shortstop/pitcher)
  - Eugenia McLin as Older Ellen Sue
- Tracy Reiner as Betty "Spaghetti" Horn (#7, left field/relief pitcher)
  - Betty Miller as Older Betty
- Bitty Schram as Evelyn Gardner (#17, right field), mother of Stillwell "Angel" Gardner
- Renée Coleman (credited as Renee Coleman) – Alice "Skeeter" Gaspers (#18, left field/center field/catcher)
  - Shirley Burkovich as Older Alice
- Ann Cusack as Shirley Baker (#11, left field)
  - Barbara Erwin as Older Shirley
- Robin Knight as Linda "Beans" Babbitt (shortstop)
- Patti Pelton as Marbleann Wilkinson (second base)
- Kelli Simpkins as Beverly Dixon (#4, outfield)
- Connie Pounds-Taylor as Connie Calhoun (Outfield)

=== Others ===
- Jon Lovitz as Ernie Capadino, AAGPBL scout
- David Strathairn as Ira Lowenstein, AAGPBL general manager
  - Marvin Einhorn as Older Ira
- Garry Marshall as Walter Harvey, candy bar mogul and AAGPBL founder (based on Philip K. Wrigley)
- Julie Croteau as Helen Haley on the field (baseball double for Anne Ramsay)
- Bill Pullman as Bob Hinson, Dottie's husband
- Téa Leoni as Racine first base
- David L. Lander as the Game Announcer
- Janet Jones as Racine pitcher
- Don S. Davis as Charlie Collins, Racine manager
- Eddie Jones as Dave Hooch, Marla's father
- Justin Scheller as Stillwell Gardner, Evelyn's son
  - Mark Holton as Older Stillwell
- Pauline Brailsford as Miss Cuthburt, Rockford chaperone
- Alan Wilder as Nelson
- Rae Allen as Ma Keller
- DeLisa Chinn-Tyler in an uncredited role as the Black woman who threw the ball back to Dottie.

== Production ==
=== Development ===
Director Penny Marshall was inspired by the 1987 television documentary A League of their Own, about the All American Girls Professional Baseball League. She had never heard of the league, and contacted the film's creators, Kelly Candaele and Kim Wilson, to collaborate with the screenwriters, Babaloo Mandel and Lowell Ganz, on producing a screenplay for 20th Century Fox. Fox eventually passed on the script and Marshall signed with Sony Pictures, which was eager to produce it.

=== Casting ===
On MLB Network's Costas at the Movies in 2013, director Penny Marshall talked about her initial interest in Demi Moore for the part of Dottie Hinson: "Demi Moore, I liked, but by the time we came around, she was pregnant." Debra Winger was then cast as Dottie and spent three months training with the Chicago Cubs in preparation. However, she dropped out of the production four weeks before the start of principal photography, later saying that the casting of Madonna was the reason for her decision. Marshall chose Geena Davis to replace Winger.

USC assistant baseball coach Bill Hughes was the film's technical adviser and put the film's ensemble cast through baseball camp three months before filming.

=== Filming ===
Principal photography began July 10, 1991. Filming the game scenes involved many physical mishaps among the actors: Anne Ramsay broke her nose with a baseball mitt while trying to catch a ball, and the large bruise seen on Renée Coleman's thigh at one point in the movie was real. Discussing the skirts they wore playing in the film, Geena Davis said on MLB Network's Costas at the Movies in 2013, "Some of our real cast, from sliding into home, had ripped the skin off their legs. It was nutty." In a 2021 interview, Petty claimed to have broken her foot during filming, but reiterated her enjoyment of the shoot and the understanding of the film's importance at the time.

The tryout scene, at a fictional Major League Baseball stadium in Chicago called Harvey Field, was filmed at the Chicago Cubs' home stadium, Wrigley Field. The Rockford Peaches' home games were filmed at League Stadium in Huntingburg, Indiana, and the championship game against Racine was filmed at Bosse Field in Evansville, Indiana. Additional games were filmed at Jay Littleton Ball Park in Ontario, California. The house where the Rockford Peaches lived is in Henderson, Kentucky; in addition to interior shots, the exterior of the house is visible both when one of the team members weds and drives off with her husband and when Dottie is leaving with her husband. Railroad depot and onboard train scenes were filmed at the Illinois Railway Museum in Union, Illinois. The interior scenes for the raucous dance at the 'Suds Bucket' were filmed at FitzGerald's Nightclub in Berwyn, Illinois, while the exterior shots for the 'Suds Bucket' were filmed at the Hornville Tavern near Evansville, Indiana. The final week of shooting was during late October 1991 in Cooperstown, New York, where 65 original AAGPBL members appeared in scenes recreating the induction of the league into the Baseball Hall of Fame in 1988.

Due to the length of the schedule, the cast entertained themselves by putting on an elaborate amateur production, Jesus Christ Superstar Goes Hawaiian.

=== Soundtrack ===
The A League of Their Own soundtrack was released on CD and cassette tape by Columbia Records on June 30, 1992. The album peaked at #159 on the US Billboard 200 albums chart on July 25, 1992. Although Madonna contributed "This Used to Be My Playground" to the film, featured over the closing credits, her recording was not included on the soundtrack album for contractual reasons.

== Reception ==
=== Box office ===
A League of Their Own was released on July 1, 1992, and grossed $13.2 million in its first weekend, finishing second at the box office behind Batman Returns. In its second weekend it dropped just 15%, making $11.5 million and finishing first. It ended up a commercial success, making $107.5 million in the United States and Canada, but only $24.9 million in other territories, for a worldwide total of $132.4 million against a production budget of $40 million.

=== Critical response ===
A League of Their Own was well received by critics, who praised the cast. On review aggregator Rotten Tomatoes, it holds an approval rating of 82% based on 82 reviews, with an average score of 7/10. The website's critical consensus reads: "Sentimental and light, but still thoroughly charming, A League of Their Own is buoyed by solid performances from a wonderful cast." On Metacritic, the film received a weighted average score of 69 based on 21 reviews, indicating "generally favorable" reviews. Audiences polled by CinemaScore gave the film an average grade of "A−" on an A+ to F scale.

Vincent Canby of The New York Times wrote: "Though big of budget, A League of Their Own is one of the year's most cheerful, most relaxed, most easily enjoyable comedies. It's a serious film that's lighter than air, a very funny movie that manages to score a few points for feminism in passing." Roger Ebert of the Chicago Sun-Times gave it three out of four stars, and wrote: "The movie has a real bittersweet charm. The baseball sequences, we've seen before. What's fresh are the personalities of the players, the gradual unfolding of their coach, and the way this early chapter of women's liberation fit into the hidebound traditions of professional baseball."

=== Accolades ===
On December 19, 2012, it was announced that A League of Their Own would be preserved in the United States National Film Registry.

Jimmy Dugan's (Tom Hanks) remark to Evelyn Gardner (Bitty Schram), "There's no crying in baseball!", was ranked 54th on the American Film Institute's 2005 list AFI's 100 Years...100 Movie Quotes.

== Home media ==
A League of Their Own was released as a 20th Anniversary Edition Blu-ray on October 16, 2012.

== AAGPBL reunions ==
Forty-seven former AAGPBL players reunited in New York to celebrate the film and the real women who inspired it. Events included a trip to Cooperstown for a special program at the National Baseball Hall of Fame, reminiscent of the film's final scene depicting AAGPBL players and family meeting to honor the Women's Professional Baseball League. The reunion wrapped up with a game of softball held at Alliance Bank Stadium in nearby Syracuse.

Former players also made an appearance at Bosse Field in Evansville, Indiana on June 6, 2012, where many of the film's game scenes were filmed. Bosse Field still retains many of the Racine Belles themes from the movie. The event included an outdoor screening of the film, and a display of cars featured in the film. In addition to Bosse Field, the production used Huntingburg, Indiana's League Stadium, another Southwestern Indiana field older than Bosse, that was renovated for it.

== Spinoffs ==
A short-lived series of the same title based on the film aired on CBS in April 1993, with Garry Marshall, Megan Cavanagh, Tracy Reiner, Freddie Simpson and Jon Lovitz reprising their roles. Carey Lowell took over Geena Davis's role. Only five of the six episodes made were broadcast.

On August 6, 2020, Amazon Video ordered a reboot series with the same title as the movie. The series debuted on August 12, 2022, on Amazon. The series was renewed in March 2023 for a four-episode final season, but in August 2023, Amazon announced that the second season would be scrapped due to delays caused by the WGA strike.

== See also ==
- Women in baseball
- List of baseball films
