= Parenthood (film) =

1989 film by Ron Howard

- Theatrical release poster
- Directed by: Ron Howard
- Screenplay by: Lowell Ganz; Babaloo Mandel
- Story by: Lowell Ganz; Babaloo Mandel; Ron Howard
- Produced by: Brian Grazer
- Starring: Steve Martin; Tom Hulce; Rick Moranis; Martha Plimpton; Keanu Reeves; Jason Robards; Mary Steenburgen; Dianne Wiest
- Cinematography: Donald McAlpine
- Edited by: Daniel P. Hanley; Mike Hill
- Music by: Randy Newman
- Production company: Imagine Entertainment
- Distributed by: Universal Pictures
- Release date: August 2, 1989
- Running time: 124 minutes
- Country: United States
- Language: English
- Budget: $20 million
- Box office: $126 million

Parenthood is a 1989 American coming-of-age comedy-drama film with an ensemble cast that includes Steve Martin, Tom Hulce, Rick Moranis, Martha Plimpton, Keanu Reeves, Jason Robards, Mary Steenburgen, and Dianne Wiest.

The film was directed by Ron Howard, who assisted in developing the story with screenwriters Lowell Ganz and Babaloo Mandel. Much of it is based on the family and parenting experiences of Howard, Ganz, Mandel, and producer Brian Grazer, who have at least 17 children among the four of them. Principal photography was filmed in and around Orlando, Florida with some scenes filmed at the University of Florida. Parenthood was released by Universal Pictures on August 2, 1989. The film received critical acclaim and grossed $126 million against a $20 million budget. It was nominated for two Academy Awards: Dianne Wiest for Best Supporting Actress and Randy Newman for Best Song for "I Love to See You Smile".

The film was adapted into NBC television series in 1990 and 2010. While the first series was canceled after one season, the second series ran for six seasons.

== Plot ==
The plot centers on the four Buckman siblings: Gil, Helen, Larry, and Susan.

Gil Buckman, a St. Louis sales executive, is trying to balance his family and his career. When he finds out that his eldest son, Kevin, has emotional problems and needs psychological counseling and that his two younger children, Taylor and Justin, both have issues as well, he begins to blame himself and questions his abilities as a father. When his wife, Karen, becomes pregnant with their fourth child, he is unsure whether he can handle it.

Gil is also frustrated and fearful that the financial burdens of another child and office politics at work are turning him into the detached workaholic he despised in his own father, Frank. Humbled by family and work issues, Gil opens up to Frank about his doubts as a parent. Frank tells him that he worries too much, and they have a reconciliation of sorts with Frank telling Gil that worry for one's children never ends. Gil is finally able to accept the life he has chosen after his elderly grandmother tells him the story of her first experience riding a roller coaster when she was young; she was amazed at all of the different emotions she experienced compared to the merry-go-round, which was simple and bland.

Gil's sister Helen is a divorced bank manager and mother of two, Julie and Garry. Her wealthy dentist ex-husband wants nothing to do with their kids beyond his small child support payments, preferring to spend more time with his new family. Garry, who has just entered puberty, is quiet and withdrawn and likes to be alone in his room with a mysterious paper bag. At first, Helen worries that it contains drugs or alcohol, but later discovers that it actually contains pornography as Garry has discovered masturbation. Garry wants to stay with his father for a while, but his father refuses. Infuriated, Garry demolishes his office.

Julie is still in high school but is not interested in her education. She and her boyfriend, Tod Higgins, get married, she becomes pregnant, and Tod moves into Helen's house. Helen asks Tod to talk with Garry, believing he would be more comfortable confiding in another male. Tod reassures Garry that his obsession with girls and sex/masturbation is normal for a boy his age, to Garry's relief. This also increases Helen's respect for Tod, especially when Tod reveals his own past involving his abusive father and his determination not to follow the same path. Eventually, she supports Tod and Julie's relationship to the extent that when Julie wants to break up with Tod, Helen orders her to face her fears and work on their relationship. Helen also starts dating Garry's science teacher, George Bowman—giving Garry a stable father figure.

Susan, Gil and Helen's younger sister, is a middle school teacher married to scientist and researcher Nathan Huffner. They have a precocious daughter, Patty. Susan wants more children, but Nathan is more interested in Patty's cognitive development. Susan lashes out by eating junk food and compromises her diaphragm as a plan to get pregnant against Nathan's wishes. She eventually gets so frustrated that she leaves Nathan. To win Susan back, he comes to one of her classes and serenades her. Nathan promises that he will try to change and she agrees to move back home.

Fourth-born Larry is the black sheep of the family, but also Frank's favorite. Rather than settle into a career, he has drifted through life trying to cash in on get-rich-quick schemes. Larry has recently shown up along with his biracial son, Cool (the result of a brief affair with a Las Vegas showgirl), asking to borrow money from Frank. It soon becomes apparent that he needs it to pay off gambling debts or he will be killed. Though Frank is disillusioned by his son, he still loves him and tries to help. Frank refuses to bail him out completely, but offers to teach him the family business so he can take over for Frank (who would have to put off retirement to pay off the debt). However, Larry instead suggests another get-rich-quick scheme which involves him going to Chile. Frank agrees to look after Cool, knowing that Larry will most likely never return.

Some time later, the family reunites at the hospital when Helen gives birth to a baby girl. Frank holds Cool, who is shown to be thriving. Tod and Julie are together, raising their son. Susan is visibly pregnant. Gil and Karen are now the parents of four.

== Cast ==
- Steve Martin as Gil
  - Max Elliott Slade as young Gil
- Mary Steenburgen as Karen
- Dianne Wiest as Helen
- Jason Robards as Frank
  - Richard Kuhlman as young Frank
- Rick Moranis as Nathan
- Tom Hulce as Larry
- Martha Plimpton as Julie
- Keanu Reeves as Tod
- Harley Jane Kozak as Susan
- Dennis Dugan as David Brodsky
- Joaquin Phoenix as Garry (credited as Leaf Phoenix)
- Eileen Ryan as Marilyn
- Helen Shaw as Grandma
- Jasen Fisher as Kevin
- Paul Linke as George Bowman
- Alisan Porter as Taylor
- Zachary LaVoy as Justin
- Ivyann Schwan as Patty
- Alex Burrall as Cool
- Clint Howard as Lou
- Isabel Cooley as Barbara Rice

== Release ==
=== Box office ===
The film opened at #1 in its opening weekend, earning $10 million. It eventually grossed over $100 million domestically and $126 million worldwide.

=== Critical reception ===
On review aggregator Rotten Tomatoes, the film holds an approval rating of 92% based on 60 reviews, with an average score of 7.50/10. The website's critical consensus reads: "Bolstered by a delightful cast, Parenthood is a funny and thoughtfully crafted look at the best and worst moments of family life that resonates broadly". On Metacritic, the film received a score of 82 based on 17 reviews. Audiences polled by CinemaScore gave the film an average grade of "A" on an A+ to F scale.

Chris Dafoe of The Globe and Mail thought the scenes were "well-written, funny, and often poignant", yet noted its "haphazard structure can sometimes make [it] seem glib and insensitive." He disliked how the finale became "a hymn to fecundity", describing that aspect as "a little troubling." Dafoe wrote that the film overall was "a charming, amusing piece of work. It doesn't say anything new - but it says the old things with enough wit and eloquence." Jay Carr of The Boston Globe wrote that the film was "gritty, filled with surprising stabs of feeling." He praised Martin as "muted, admirably assenting in the film's refusal to pretend that the suddenly responsive dad's attentions are [perfect]", noting "Wiest is wonderful at registering soft strength." Carr liked how "its all-star acting team ignites, as in the scenes between Wiest and Plimpton, or Robards and Hulce." He thought it had "wary celebratoriness" and messiness that was "at once the film's liability and its biggest asset." Julie Salamon of The Wall Street Journal noted how "the nuclear family" was becoming a "favourite fantasy object" in movies. She liked how the film used "sentimentality and wryness distributed in satisfying proportions" and had "so much affection for all [the] characters." Roger Ebert of the Chicago Sun-Times thought the film was "a delicate balancing act between comedy and truth" as "each hides in the other so successfully" and "more concerned with character than punch lines." He liked the "wise" screenplay, specifically when Tom Hulce's character asks his dad for "the freedom to keep on losing." Ebert praised its "many moments of accurate observation."

=== Accolades ===
Award	Category	Nominee(s)	Result	Ref.
Academy Awards	Best Supporting Actress	Dianne Wiest	Nominated	
Academy Awards	Best Original Song	"I Love to See You Smile"; Music and Lyrics by Randy Newman	Nominated	
American Comedy Awards	Funniest Actor in a Motion Picture (Leading Role)	Steve Martin	Nominated	
American Comedy Awards	Funniest Supporting Actor in a Motion Picture	Rick Moranis	Won	
American Comedy Awards	Funniest Supporting Actress in a Motion Picture	Dianne Wiest	Nominated	
Artios Awards	Outstanding Achievement in Feature Film Casting – Comedy	Jane Jenkins and Janet Hirshenson	Won	
ASCAP Film and Television Music Awards	Top Box Office Films	Randy Newman	Won	
Golden Globe Awards	Best Actor in a Motion Picture – Musical or Comedy	Steve Martin	Nominated	
Golden Globe Awards	Best Supporting Actress – Motion Picture	Dianne Wiest	Nominated	
Golden Globe Awards	Best Original Song – Motion Picture	"I Love to See You Smile"; Music and Lyrics by Randy Newman	Nominated	
Grammy Awards	Best Song Written Specifically for a Motion Picture or Television	"I Love to See You Smile" – Randy Newman	Nominated	
Tokyo International Film Festival	Tokyo Grand Prix	Ron Howard	Nominated	
Young Artist Awards	Best Family Motion Picture – Comedy		Won	
Young Artist Awards	Best Young Actor Starring in a Motion Picture	Leaf Phoenix	Nominated	
Young Artist Awards	Best Young Actor Supporting Role in a Motion Picture	Jasen Fisher	Nominated	
Young Artist Awards	Outstanding Performance by an Actor Under 9 Years of Age	Zachary La Voy	Nominated	

- It was also nominated by the American Film Institute for their 100 Years...100 Laughs series.

== Television adaptations ==
The film was adapted twice to TV: as a 1990 series and again in 2010.

=== 1990 series ===
Parenthood was one of several failed movie-to-TV adaptations in the 1990–91 season, also including Baby Talk on ABC's TGIF (a follow-up to Look Who's Talking), Ferris Bueller on NBC and Uncle Buck on CBS. It ran for 12 episodes and was not renewed for a second season.

=== 2010 series ===
A new television adaptation loosely based on the film began to air in 2010. Craig T. Nelson and Bonnie Bedelia play the parents, joined by Peter Krause, Mae Whitman, Erika Christensen, Dax Shepard, Lauren Graham and Monica Potter. It ran for six seasons and ended in January 2015.
