= Smith College School for Social Work =

- Type: Private
- Established: 1918
- Parent institution: Smith College
- Dean: Marianne Yoshioka
- Location: Northampton, Massachusetts, United States
- Campus: Urban
- Website: smith.edu/ssw

Smith College School for Social Work is the graduate school for social work of Smith College.

== History ==
Smith College School for Social Work originated from an emergency course given in the Summer of 1918-1919 to prepare social workers for service in military hospitals treating soldiers with "shell shock" returning from the First World War. Civilian psychiatric hospitals were already using social workers to assist physicians in obtaining patients’ social histories. It was considered a necessary ingredient for sound diagnosis, and to aid the patients in their "social adjustment" back to their communities after release from care. The Smith College course was the first formal training program for social workers to become trained as "psychiatric social workers", specializing in social psychiatry.

The program was created by E. E. Southard, director of the Boston Psychopathic Hospital, who was planning an emergency training course at the hospital, as well as Smith College president William Allan Nielson, who was looking for ways to use College facilities and equipment to aid in the war effort. With financial support from the Permanent Charity Fund of Boston and the National Committee for Mental Hygiene, which Southard headed, the training course began in July of 1918 with sixty-three students.

The course became a permanent program in 1919. F. Stuart Chapin, Smith College professor of sociology, was appointed the first director. Mary C. Jarrett, who was chief of social services at Boston Psychopathic Hospital, and one of the founders of the emergency trainings held in 1918, was appointed as the associate director. The newly established Smith College Training School for Social Work had four training courses: medical social work, psychiatric social work, community service, and an advanced course in child welfare for individuals already engaged in social work with children. Classes in psychology and sociology were required of all students. The eight-week didactic program was held on the Smith College campus with clinical demonstrations taking place in the Northampton State Hospital for the Insane. Students then went on to six months of practical training in hospitals and social agencies in Boston, Philadelphia, New York, and Baltimore. They would then return to Smith College for a second eight-week didactic program the following summer.

While the term "psychiatric social work" has since been replaced in the social work lexicon with "clinical social work", the SCSSW continues to train social workers specializing in the provision of mental health-focused practice. The SCSSW single focus is on clinical social work.

== Studies in Clinical Social Work: Transforming Practice, Education and Research ==
Studies in Clinical Social Work: Transforming Practice, Education and Research (formerly Smith College Studies in Social Work) is an in-house scholarly journal featuring articles on topics of relevance to clinical social work was inaugurated in 1930 and remains in publication today.

== Rankings and reputation ==
As of 2025, the school is ranked 20th in the U.S. News & World Report ranking of graduate programs in social work.

== Notable alumni ==
- Bertha Reynolds, AB 1908, MSS 1919
- Lydia Rapoport
- Caitlin Ryan, MSW 1982

== See also ==
List of social work schools
