= Greedy (film) =

1994 film by Jonathan Lynn

- Theatrical release poster
- Directed by: Jonathan Lynn
- Written by: Lowell Ganz; Babaloo Mandel
- Produced by: Brian Grazer
- Starring: Michael J. Fox; Kirk Douglas; Nancy Travis; Olivia d'Abo; Phil Hartman; Ed Begley Jr.; Colleen Camp
- Cinematography: Gabriel Beristain
- Edited by: Tony Lombardo
- Music by: Randy Edelman
- Production company: Imagine Entertainment
- Distributed by: Universal Pictures
- Release date: March 4, 1994
- Running time: 113 minutes
- Country: United States
- Language: English
- Budget: $25 million
- Box office: $13,137,484

Greedy is a 1994 American comedy film directed by Jonathan Lynn and written by Lowell Ganz and Babaloo Mandel, and stars Michael J. Fox, Kirk Douglas, Nancy Travis, Olivia d'Abo, Phil Hartman, Ed Begley Jr., and Colleen Camp. It tells the story about an elderly wheelchair-using scrap metal tycoon whose younger relatives compete to get the inheritance when he dies as the tycoon's grand-nephew and girlfriend get caught in the struggle.

The original music score was composed by Randy Edelman. Upon its release, the movie received a mixed reception from critics.

== Plot ==
Joe McTeague is a wealthy, wheelchair-using scrap-metal tycoon who has to put up with his niece Patti, his nephews Carl, Frank, and Glen, and their respective spouses Ed, Nora, Tina, and Muriel. They named their kids after their uncle and continually suck up to him and try to outdo each other in order to inherit his $25 million fortune when he dies. With their attempts constantly failing and irritable Uncle Joe showing a decided interest in his new sexy "nurse" Molly Richardson, Frank decides to hire a private detective named Laura to bring in their cousin Daniel (who turned his back on the family years ago because of their greed and selfishness), believing if they can make up, Uncle Joe will thaw towards them.

Instead of finding Daniel, Laura finds his son Danny of whom Uncle Joe had always been especially fond. A professional bowler, Danny left the family with his father, but he accepts the cousins' invitation to return — after blowing his big moment by rolling a gutter ball in a big tournament and finding out that he has a pre-arthritic condition developing in his wrist.

Danny's television sports producer and girlfriend Robin encourages him to ask Uncle Joe for a loan of $300,000 to invest in a bowling alley. Joe says he will lend the money only if Danny sides with him against his own father. Danny is offended and leaves with his girlfriend, much to the annoyance of the other relatives. They confront Molly later on and she realizes just how conniving and desperate they are for Uncle Joe's fortune.

Uncle Joe asks Danny to visit him at his scrapyard, to apologize for trying to bribe him, but the old man calls a number to place a shipping order to a company he finds out has been closed for 25 years. Realizing that his relatives could declare him incompetent and throw him in a retirement home, he tells Danny that he plans to hand his fortune over to Molly. Danny realizes how much he'd like to inherit his fortune and tells him not to rush into anything.

Danny moves in with Uncle Joe and starts competing for his money, even so far as to sing a Jimmy Durante song that Joe loved him to perform as a little kid. But Molly has other ideas and decides to use her "assets" to outdo Danny and have sex with the elderly gentleman, if only to keep the relatives from getting his money. But after her successful attempt to get Joe in the bedroom, they are interrupted by Danny's father Daniel and he and Danny engage in a heated argument, in which Danny chooses Uncle Joe over him. Molly feels disgusted with herself for almost having sex with Joe and tells Danny she has to leave, but not before Danny promises to look after Joe. However, Danny tells Robin that he'd actually hired an actor to play his "so-called" father, to win favor with his Uncle, and she feels he's become too greedy and leaves him.

At Joe's attorney's office, Danny is ready to inherit Joe's fortune when his relatives arrive with his real father (who only refers to his cousins as "these gerbils"). Danny admits that he's become as bad as the rest of the family. However it soon becomes apparent that Uncle Joe is not only bankrupt, having lost his estimated $25 million fortune, but that he is actually $95,000 in debt. After a big scene that involves Frank fighting Danny, the relatives leave and Joe tells Danny that he was simply "playing them" to find out who actually loved him. Danny tells him "nobody loves you" and leaves to make up with Robin.

When Danny asks Joe's butler Douglas where Uncle Joe is, Douglas says that he doesn't know. Danny has a change of heart and realizes that no matter what Joe did to trick them, he's still family and loves him. He also tells Robin about it after getting her attention with holding a "He was broke" sign at a sporting event she was covering. Danny makes up with her.

With Joe's ill health, bankruptcy, and homelessness, Danny and Robin decide to let Joe stay with them in their apartment. But Joe gives them another surprise and reveals that he still has a fortune and that out of his family he had to find out "who really loves me." Then he tells Danny and Robin to look out the window where they see Molly and Douglas standing outside across the street next to Joe's Rolls Royce. He suggests they stay with him saying "whatever I own, you own." Danny accepts on the condition that all of the lies and the games stop. Uncle Joe agrees and finishes his final lie by calmly getting up out of his wheelchair and walking out of the apartment whilst a shocked Danny and Robin watch.

== Cast ==
- Michael J. Fox as Daniel "Danny" McTeague, Jr., a professional bowler and Joe's grand-nephew.
- Kirk Douglas as Joe McTeague, an aging wheelchair-using scrap metal tycoon worth over $25 million.
- Nancy Travis as Robin, Danny's girlfriend, a television sports producer.
- Olivia d'Abo as Molly Richardson, Joe's sexy nurse.
- Phil Hartman as Frank McTeague, Joe's nephew and Danny's uncle.
- Ed Begley Jr. as Carl McTeague, Joe's nephew and Danny's uncle.
- Colleen Camp as Patti McTeague-Ault, Joe's niece and Danny's aunt.
- Jere Burns as Glen McTeague, Joe's nephew and Danny's uncle.
- Bob Balaban as Ed Ault, Patti's husband and Danny's uncle.
- Joyce Hyser as Muriel McTeague, Glen's wife and Danny's aunt.
- Mary Ellen Trainor as Nora McTeague, Carl's wife and Danny's aunt.
- Siobhan Fallon as Tina McTeague, Frank's wife and Danny's aunt.
- Kevin McCarthy as Barlett, Joe's lawyer.
- Khandi Alexander as Laura, a private investigator hired by Frank to look for Danny Sr.
- Jonathan Lynn (the film's director) as Douglas, Joe's butler.
- Francis X. McCarthy as Daniel "Danny" McTeague, Danny's father and Joe's cousin.
- Tom Mason as an actor Danny Jr. hired to play his father.
- Austin Pendleton as Hotel Clerk
- Adam Hendershott as Joseph "Joe" McTeague, Carl and Nora's 9-year-old son.
- Eric Lloyd as Jonas "Joe" McTeague, Carl and Nora's 7-year-old son.
- Kirsten Dunst as Jolene Ault, Patti and Ed's daughter.
- Lisa Bradley as Joette Ault, Patti and Ed's daughter.
- Sean Babb as Dennis McTeague, Frank and Tina's son.
- Vince Morton as Uncle Vince at the Piano, a relative of Joe who plays the piano
- John Lafayette as Wayne, Robin's Assistant Producer
- Chris Schenkel as himself

== Production ==
In January 1993, it was reported that Babaloo Mandel and Lowell Ganz were developing Greed for Imagine Entertainment, a comedy about members of an extended family vying for the wealthy uncle's inheritance. The premise for the film took inspiration from Martin Chuzzlewit by Charles Dickens while the name of Kirk Douglas' character of Joe McTeague was a reference to McTeague by Frank Norris which had served as the basis for the 1924 Erich von Stroheim film Greed. In April of that year, it was announced that Universal Pictures had fast tracked development of Greed with Michael J. Fox set to star and Jonathan Lynn to direct. By August, the film had been retitled Greedy.

== Release ==
=== Box office ===
The movie debuted at No. 2 at the box office behind Ace Ventura: Pet Detective.

=== Reception ===
On Rotten Tomatoes, 32% of 19 reviews were positive, with an average rating of 4.70/10 rating. Audiences polled by CinemaScore gave the film a grade "B+" on scale of A to F.

Roger Ebert of the Chicago Sun-Times gave it 2 out of 4 and wrote: "The movie has a promising first act, and then makes the mistake of taking its silly story seriously, with dreadful results: The last two-thirds of this movie plays like a sitcom without the laugh track—or the laughs." Kevin Thomas of the Los Angeles Times wrote that "Kirk Douglas is so good in Greedy that you’re tempted to forgive this wildly uneven satire its overkill script and often ponderous direction." In her review for The New York Times, Janet Maslin wrote that Fox "once again displays deft timing and all the sprightly energy his role demands," and that he and Douglas "work well together even when the material shows its maudlin side." In a largely positive review for The Washington Post, Roger Piantadosi wrote that the film "kind of sneaks up on you. Before you realize what's happening, you might even find yourself recommending it to strangers."

The 1997 Indian Malayalam-language family drama film, Katha Nayakan, is reported to have been inspired by this movie.
