= Behind the Red Door (film) =

2003 film by Matia Karrell

- Behind the Red Door Poster
- Directed by: Matia Karrell
- Written by: Matia Karrell; C.W. Cressler
- Produced by: Kjehl Rasmussen; Matia Karrell; Jeff Geoffray
- Starring: Kyra Sedgwick; Kiefer Sutherland; Stockard Channing
- Cinematography: Robert Elswit
- Edited by: Barry Farrell
- Music by: David Fleury
- Production companies: Blue Rider Pictures; Praxis Entertainment
- Distributed by: Columbia Pictures
- Release date: January 12, 2003
- Running time: 105 minutes
- Countries: United States; Japan; Finland; Spain

Behind the Red Door is a 2003 drama film directed by Matia Karrell. The lead characters in the movie are Kyra Sedgwick, Kiefer Sutherland and Stockard Channing. The film depicts the relationship between a sister and her brother, who is suffering from the fatal disease AIDS.

== Plot ==
Natalie Haddad (Kyra Sedgwick) is a talented photographer living in New York City who is undergoing a financial crisis. Her friend Julia (Stockard Channing) finds for her a two-day job in Boston for US$20,000, which Natalie has to accept. Upon her arrival at Boston, she finds that her arrogant gay brother Roy (Kiefer Sutherland), a successful designer, had hired her. Their relationship was broken 10 years earlier and since then they had not seen each other. When Natalie finishes her assignment, her brother Roy asks her to stay for the next day, as he has organised a birthday party for himself. After the birthday party, Roy tells her that he is suffering from AIDS. Although Roy is insufferably snobbish and manipulative, he manages to exert a curious control over Natalie, forcing her to confront several disturbing, long-suppressed memories of her past (shown in black-and-white flashbacks). She agrees to stay with him and in due course of time their fraternal relationship develops again.

== Cast ==
- Kyra Sedgwick as Natalie Haddad
- Kiefer Sutherland as Roy Haddad
- Stockard Channing as Julia
- Chuck Shamata as Father of Natalie and Roy
- Hannah Lochner as Young Natalie Haddad
- Corey Staden as Young Roy Haddad
- Phillip Craig as Detective Kinzer
- Jason Carter as Sonny
- Laura Press as Michelle

== Release and reception ==
The film was initially broadcast on the Showtime network as part of "a multiyear initiative" by Viacom, Showtime's parent, "to address HIV/AIDS issues." The film received mostly positive reviews from critics. Rotten Tomatoes rated its freshness at 78%.

Jerry Weinstein of Culturevulture.net said: "The awkward set-up finally gives way to a portrait of a family of two, who are at last there for one another." Weinstein praised Sedgwick and Sutherland's portrayal of sister and brother, saying, "Although Behind the Red Door is in parts a schematic, more than a nuanced drama, both Kyra Sedgwick and Kiefer Sutherland portray sister and brother with dignity." He also praised the portrayal of a gay man suffering from AIDS and expressed hope that Viacom's corporate "synergy" might "be leveraged in such a fashion that it can make a positive difference, fostering dialogue and promoting understanding".

Multichannel News liked the film, calling it "[a]n elegant little Showtime telefilm . . . saddled with a truly unfortunate name". Houston Chronicle critic Ann Hodges said that it "comes close, at times, to sentimental melodrama, but it recovers" and "builds to a two-hanky ending." In a brief review, the Chicago Tribune noted the "sensitive performances" by Sedgwick and Sutherland, but found the murder subplot to be "unnecessary".

On the other hand, The New York Times critic Anita Gates wrote a mainly negative review, concluding that despite the director's evident personal connection to the material (her own brother had died of AIDS), the film "is undermined by simplistic dialog and one-note direction" as well as by what Gates found to be the unpleasant personalities of the main characters.
