= Caitlin Ryan =

Caitlin Ryan may refer to:

- Caitlin Regal (née Ryan), New Zealand canoeist
- Caitlin Ryan (social worker), American social worker and researcher
- Caitlin Ryan (Degrassi), a character in the Canadian drama franchise Degrassi
- Caitlin Ryan, a character in the British soap opera Coronation Street
