= Josh Alan Friedman =

American novelist

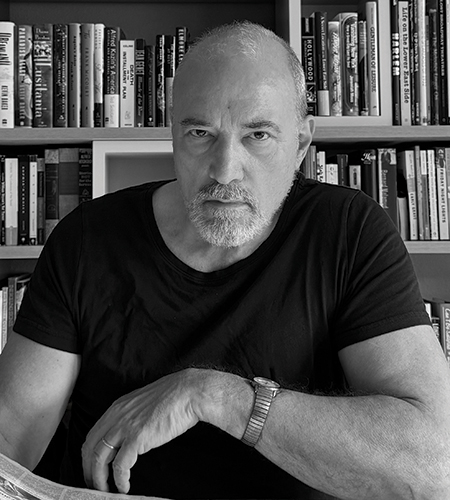
- Occupations: Musician, writer
- Relatives: Bruce Jay Friedman (father) Drew Friedman (brother) Chloe Friedman (daughter)
- Writing career
- Pen name: John Alan
- Period: 1976–present

Josh Alan Friedman is an American musician, writer, editor and journalist, who has worked in New York and Dallas. He is known for his 1986 collection Tales of Times Square and his comics collaborations with his brother, artist Drew Friedman. Many of these are compiled in the books Any Similarity to Persons Living or Dead is Purely Coincidental and Warts and All. Friedman is also a musician and songwriter, recording and performing under the name Josh Alan.

== Music career ==
Though Friedman began playing guitar at 9, a pitching injury at 14 cost him the use of his right arm for two years. "I figured if I ever had the honor of being able to play again, no one's going to pull me away from it." His time as a student with journeyman jazz guitarist Joe Monk in particular left a deep impression on the young musician.

Friedman spent his last five years in New York working as a guitarist with the busy show band City Limits, featuring Richard Lanham, former vocalist for The Drifters.

Following his move to Dallas in 1987, Friedman began recording and performing as a solo artist in earnest. He also recorded and performed extensively with Sara Hickman, and produced Dallas' KERA 90.1 Sound Sessions. Billed as "Josh Alan", he barnstormed the state of Texas for 30 years, rocking whole arenas with his Guild D-40 and earning three Dallas Observer Music Awards for Best Acoustic Act. He was noted for his live use of acoustic feedback, the Maestro Echoplex and surf instrumentals, as well as an acoustic medley of Black exploitation movie soundtracks.

He has released six albums: Famous & Poor, The Worst! (a musical based on the life and career of "Worst Director of All Time" Ed Wood), Blacks 'n' Jews (the title of which was also used for a documentary on Friedman's life), Josh Alan Band, Sixty, Goddammit, and Acoustic Instrumentals.

Josh Alan has recorded and/or played with Sara Hickman, Keb' Mo', Kinky Friedman, Bugs Henderson, Phoebe Legere, and was a perennial opener in Texas for dozens of rock and blues acts, including Johnny Winter, Clarence "Gatemouth" Brown, War, Huey Lewis and the News, Bad Company, Mitch Ryder, Michael Nesmith and Wanda Jackson.

== Writing career ==
Friedman's first published work was for Screw magazine. He continued to write for the magazine for several years, eventually holding the position of Senior Editor through 1982. He covered the Times Square beat for Screw during a perilous time when few, if any writers, ventured there. He also worked as a producer on Screw's cable television show, Midnight Blue. Several of Friedman's Screw pieces would eventually serve as the foundation for his 1986 collection, Tales of Times Square, documenting "pre-Disney" Times Square. Additionally, "Meeting Groucho", Friedman's childhood reminiscence of a memorable dinner with comedian Groucho Marx, was published in New York Magazine as "A Memory of Groucho" in August 1978.

Concurrently, Friedman worked as a stringer for Soho News, contributing celebrity profiles, notably of legendary songwriter Doc Pomus. Pomus became a friend and mentor, and Friedman credits Pomus with teaching him to be a songwriter "without him knowing it. Just by hanging around him, I felt like he taught me how to write songs…that's what turned me from being a frustrated songwriter into a songwriter."

During this period, Friedman's comix collaborations with brother Drew were gaining momentum. Beginning with a parody of The Andy Griffith Show, first published in School of Visual Arts instructor Harvey Kurtzman's student publication, Kar-tunz' (later reprinted in RAW magazine), the Friedmans developed a following for their parodies and dissections of obscure pop culture figures. Their comics had a discernible influence on SCTV.

Much of their work as a team was collected in the books Any Similarity to Persons Living or Dead is Purely Coincidental (1985) and Warts and All (1990). Warts and All included an effusive introduction by Kurt Vonnegut, and the book won a comics industry Harvey Award in 1991.

Friedman served as Managing Editor of High Times magazine in 1983, and as Contributing Editor to National Lampoon in the 1980s.

In 2001, Josh co-edited Now Dig This: The Unspeakable Writings of Terry Southern in collaboration with Nile Southern.

In 2005, Feral House published When Sex Was Dirty.

In 2006, I, Goldstein: My Screwed Life (with Al Goldstein) was released by Thunder's Mouth Press.

In 2007, Feral House reissued Tales of Times Square in an expanded edition.

In 2008, Tell the Truth Until They Bleed: Coming Clean in the Dirty World of Blues and Rock 'n' Roll was published by Backbeat Books. The book's opening section, a profile of songwriter Jerry Leiber, evolved from an ill-fated collaboration between Friedman and Leiber on Leiber's autobiography.

In 2010, his autobiographical novel Black Cracker was published by Wyatt Doyle Books. The same year, Friedman provided the introduction to Michael H. Price's biography of Mantan Moreland, Mantan the Funnyman

In 2012, Fantagraphics Books reprinted Any Similarity to Persons Living or Dead is Purely Coincidental, including new material from both Friedmans unique to that edition.

In 2018, Friedman launched BlackCracker.fm, a new website and online archive. It features 35 episodes of his legacy podcast from 2018, Tales of Times Square…The Tapes, and from 2019, Tales of…My Dead Heroes. Reprints, photographs, unpublished material and new work are also posted.

In 2026, his novel All Roads Lead to Great Neck will be published by Wyatt Doyle Books.

== Selected bibliography ==
=== Non-fiction ===
- Tell the Truth Until They Bleed (Revised edition). Los Angeles: Wyatt Doyle Books/New Texture, 2015
- Tell the Truth Until They Bleed. New York: Backbeat Books/Hal Leonard, 2008
- Tales of Times Square (Expanded edition). Los Angeles: Feral House, 2007
- I, Goldstein (with Al Goldstein). New York: Thunder's Mouth Press, 2006
- When Sex Was Dirty. Los Angeles: Feral House, 2005
- Tales of Times Square. Los Angeles: Feral House, 1993
- Tales of Times Square. New York: Delacorte Press, 1986

=== Fiction ===
- All Roads Lead to Great Neck. Philadelphia: Wyatt Doyle Books/New Texture, 2026. (Forthcoming)
- Weasels Ripped My Flesh! (Expanded edition) (co-editor with Robert Deis and Wyatt Doyle). Philadelphia: New Texture, 2024.
- Weasels Ripped My Flesh! (co-editor with Robert Deis and Wyatt Doyle). Los Angeles: New Texture, 2013.
- Black Cracker: An Autobiographical Novel. Los Angeles: Wyatt Doyle Books/New Texture, 2010.
- Now Dig This: The Unspeakable Writings of Terry Southern (co-editor with Nile Southern). New York: Grove Press, 2001.
- Warts and All (with Drew Friedman). New York: Penguin, 1990.
- Any Similarity to Persons Living Or Dead Is Purely Coincidental (with Drew Friedman). Agoura, CA: Fantagraphics, 1985.

== Discography ==
=== Albums ===
Year	Album	US	Label
1991	Famous & Poor	—	Four Dots
1994	The Worst!	—	Black Cracker/Gorse
1997	Blacks 'n' Jews	—	Black Cracker
2001	Josh Alan Band	—	TopCat
2016	Sixty, Goddammit	—	Black Cracker/New Texture
2025	Acoustic Instrumentals	—	Black Cracker

=== Singles ===
Year	Single	US	Label
1988	"Thanksgiving at McDonald's in Times Square"	—	Alternative Music

== Filmography ==
Paul Stone's unfinished adaptation of Tales of Times Square and Kevin Page's documentary on Josh Alan's life, Blacks and Jews, have played film festivals.

== See also ==
Bruce Jay Friedman

Drew Friedman

Times Square

Texas Blues

Screw Magazine

Al Goldstein

Terry Southern
