= Drew Friedman: Vermeer of the Borscht Belt =

Drew Friedman: Vermeer of the Borscht Belt is a 2024 documentary film about the cartoonist and illustrator Drew Friedman.
