= Bruce Jay Friedman =

American novelist, screenwriter, and playwright (1930–2020)

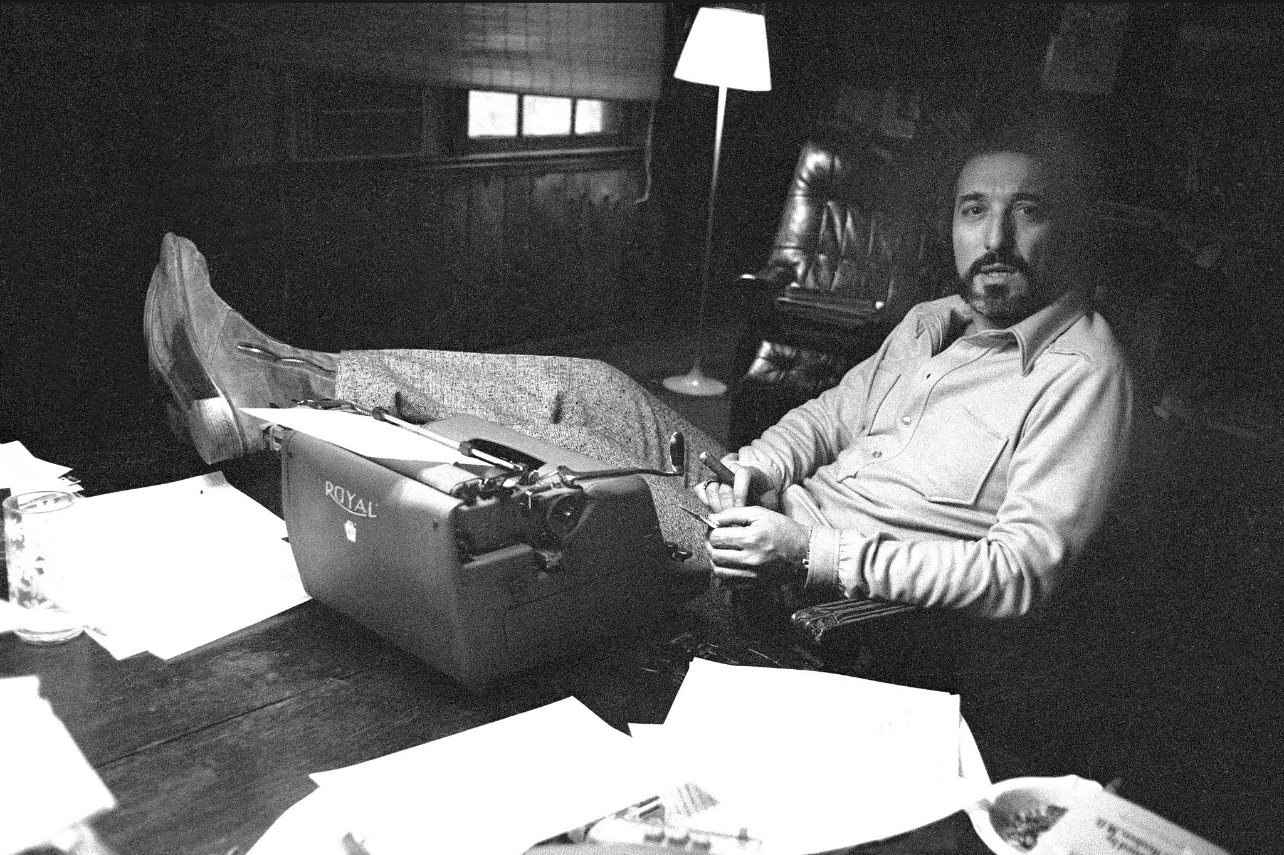
- Friedman in 1970
- Born: April 26, 1930; The Bronx, New York City, U.S.
- Died: June 3, 2020 (aged 90); Brooklyn, New York City, U.S
- Education: University of Missouri (BA)
- Occupations: Novelist; screenwriter; playwright; actor
- Spouses: Ginger Howard (m. 1954; div. 1978) Patricia O'Donohue (m. 1983)
- Children: 4, including Josh Alan and Drew Friedman

Bruce Jay Friedman (April 26, 1930 – June 3, 2020) was an American novelist, screenwriter, playwright, and actor. He was noted for his versatility of writing in both literature and pop culture. He was also a trailblazer in the style of modern American black humor. The themes he wrote about reflected the major changes taking place in society during the 1960s and 1970s. Many of his stories were inspired by the events of his personal life.

== Early life ==
Friedman was born in New York City on April 26, 1930, and was raised in The Bronx, together with his sister, Dollie. His father, Irving, worked at a company selling women's apparel; his mother, Mollie (Liebowitz), was a regular theatergoer. His family was Jewish. Friedman attended DeWitt Clinton High School before studying journalism at the University of Missouri, having applied unsuccessfully to Columbia University. He subsequently joined the United States Air Force and wrote for the military publication Air Training. One of his commanding officers there made him a gift of The Catcher in the Rye, Of Time and the River, and From Here to Eternity. After reading the books in approximately a single weekend, it spurred him on to become a writer.

== Career ==
After he finished his two-year stint in the military, Friedman went back to The Bronx. He wrote his first short story titled "Wonderful Golden Rule Days", which he sold to The New Yorker. He was later employed by Magazine Management Company in 1954, working for many of the era's famous men's magazines. Friedman ended up as an executive editor in charge of the magazines Men (not the present magazine of the same title), Male, and Man's World.

Friedman published Stern, the first of his eight novels, in 1962 to reviews that noted the author's use of comedy. Writing in The Press Democrat, Isabelle Hoover said of the author: "His style is swift-moving, his story humorous and at the same time serious. The pages of his short book are generously sprinkled with sex and the ubiquitous four letter words of modern writers. But essentially Stern is a novel about spiritual conflict." Ron Martin began his review in The Detroit Free Press: "It is said that when Bruce Jay Friedman was graduated from DeWitt Clinton High School in New York City, he was voted the second funniest fellow in his class. It is a safe bet that Friedman is now ready to go to the head of the class."

Stern was followed shortly by A Mother's Kisses (1964) and his first play, Scuba Duba (1967). The success of these three works led to his being named "The Hottest Writer of the Year" by The New York Times Magazine in 1968. He switched his focus to writing screenplays after the 1970s. He wrote the script for Stir Crazy in 1980, which wound up being the third-highest-grossing film in the U.S. that year. Four years later, he composed the first draft of Splash. It received an Academy Award nomination for Best Original Screenplay, which Friedman shared with Brian Grazer, Lowell Ganz, and Babaloo Mandel.

Friedman wrote several novels throughout the 1980s and 1990s that garnered "respectful reviews". However, critics were of the opinion that they lacked the same level of inventiveness as his previous works. In 1988, he appeared in Woody Allen's film Another Woman. He would go on to feature in two other films directed by Allen during the following decade: Husbands and Wives (1992) and Celebrity (1998). Friedman's collection of short fiction, Three Balconies, appeared in September 2008, from Biblioasis, who also published his 2011 memoir Lucky Bruce. A collection of four plays (Scuba Duba, Steambath, Sardines and The Trial), titled 3.1 Plays, was published in January 2012.

=== Style ===
Friedman was an early writer of modern American black humor, together with his peers Joseph Heller (also a close friend of his), Stanley Elkin, and Thomas Pynchon. The style was given this name in part because of the 1965 anthology by the same name that he edited. When asked about the origin of the term by Newsday in 1995, he revealed, "I don't really know if I invented [it]". He was described by The New York Times as a "deadpan prose stylist" who was a "savage social satirist". The themes of his writings reflected the social cataclysm that took place during the 1960s and 1970s. He utilized his experiences from that time to touch upon race and gender relations. He also made use of other experiences from his personal life to base his writings on. For instance, the crowded Brooklyn apartment setting in A Mother's Kisses was similar to the three-room apartment in the Bronx where he was raised, while the main character's rejection by Columbia University mirrored his own failed attempt at applying to that institution. The plot of his short story "A Change of Plan", in which a man falls in love with another woman at the hotel pool during his honeymoon in Florida, reflected how Friedman's own honeymoon unfolded in the aforementioned state.

Friedman was noted for his versatility of writing novels, short stories, plays, in addition to being a screenwriter and magazine editor. He frequently discussed how conflicted he felt in composing screenplays for profit and for pleasure, as opposed to his "higher calling" of authoring novels. He summed up his attitude towards the former as, "Take the money, scribble a bit, and enjoy the room service".

== Personal life and death ==
Friedman married Ginger Howard in 1954. Together, they had three sons: Josh, Kipp and Drew. They divorced in 1978, after their marriage "crumbled like an old graham cracker". Five years later, he married Patricia O'Donohue. They remained married until his death, and had one daughter, Molly.

Friedman once got into a quarrel with fellow writer Norman Mailer at the latter's house party. It turned physical when Mailer headbutted him and Mailer's wife egged him on to "kill the bastard". Although Friedman eventually prevailed in the fistfight, he had to receive a tetanus shot after Mailer bit him in the neck.

Friedman died on June 3, 2020, at his home in Brooklyn. He was 90, and had had neuropathy in the years leading up to his death. According to his wife, Patricia, he was hospitalized one month before his death due to an infection that was not related to COVID-19.

== Novels ==
- Stern (1962)
- A Mother's Kisses (1964)
- The Dick (1970)
- About Harry Towns (1974)
- Tokyo Woes (1985)
- The Current Climate (1989)
- A Father's Kisses (1996)
- Violencia!: A Musical Novel (2002)

== Short fiction ==
- Black Humor (1965) (editor)
- Black Angels: Stories (1966)
- Far from the City of Class (1963)
- Let's Hear It for a Beautiful Guy (1984)
- The Collected Short Fiction of Bruce Jay Friedman (1995)
- Sexual Pensees (with Andre Barbe) (2006)
- Three Balconies: Stories and a Novella (2008)

== Filmography ==
- The Heartbreak Kid (1972) (screenplay by Neil Simon; based on Friedman's short story "A Change of Plan")
- The Ted Bessell Show (1973) (TV)
- Fore Play (1975) (story)
- Stir Crazy (1980) (screenplay)
- Doctor Detroit (1983) (screenplay with Robert Boris and Carl Gottlieb)
- Splash (1984) (screenplay with Brian Grazer, Lowell Ganz and Babaloo Mandel)
- The Lonely Guy (1984) (screenplay by Neil Simon, Ed. Weinberger and Stan Daniels; based on Friedman's book The Lonely Guy's Book of Life)
- Brazzaville Teen-Ager (2013) (screenplay with Michael Cera; based on Friedman's 60s short story)

== Plays ==
- Scuba Duba (1967)
- Steambath (1970)
- Have You Spoken to Any Jews Lately? (1995)
- 3.1 Plays (2012)

== Non-fiction ==
- The Rascal's Guide (editor and contributor) (1959)
- The Lonely Guy's Book of Life (1978)
- Even the Rhinos Were Nymphos (2000)
- The Slightly Older Guy (2001)
- Lucky Bruce: A Literary Memoir (2011)
