= Ivyann Schwan =

American actress)

- Occupation: Actress
- Years active: 1989–2000
- Children: 1

Ivyann Schwan is an American retired actress. She has starred in the movies Parenthood and Problem Child 2. She has appeared in various TV shows such as Bill Nye the Science Guy and The Jenny Jones Show. Schwan has been on stage in such productions as Miracle on 34th Street and The Sound of Music.

== Personal life ==
Schwan's mother, Donna, served as her manager during her child acting career and was also deeply religious, so much so that she turned down an audition for her daughter for the role of Claudia in the film Interview with the Vampire (which eventually went to Kirsten Dunst).

In a 2012 interview, Schwan revealed that she had become a mother.

== Filmography ==
- Parenthood – Patty (1989)
- Problem Child 2 – Trixie Young (1991)

== Television ==
No.	Show	Role	Channel	Year
1.	Entertainment Tonight	Herself	Syndicated	
2.	Live with Regis & Kathie Lee	Herself	WABC-TV	
3.	Parenthood	Patty Merrick	NBC	1990–1991
4.	The Jenny Jones Show	Herself	First-run Syndication	1991
5.	Bill Nye the Science Guy	Herself	PBS	1993–1995
6.	Fudge	Wendy	ABC (season 1) CBS (season 2)	1995–1997

== Stage performance ==
- The Sound of Music

== Albums ==
- Daisies (2000)
