= Drew Friedman (cartoonist) =

American cartoonist

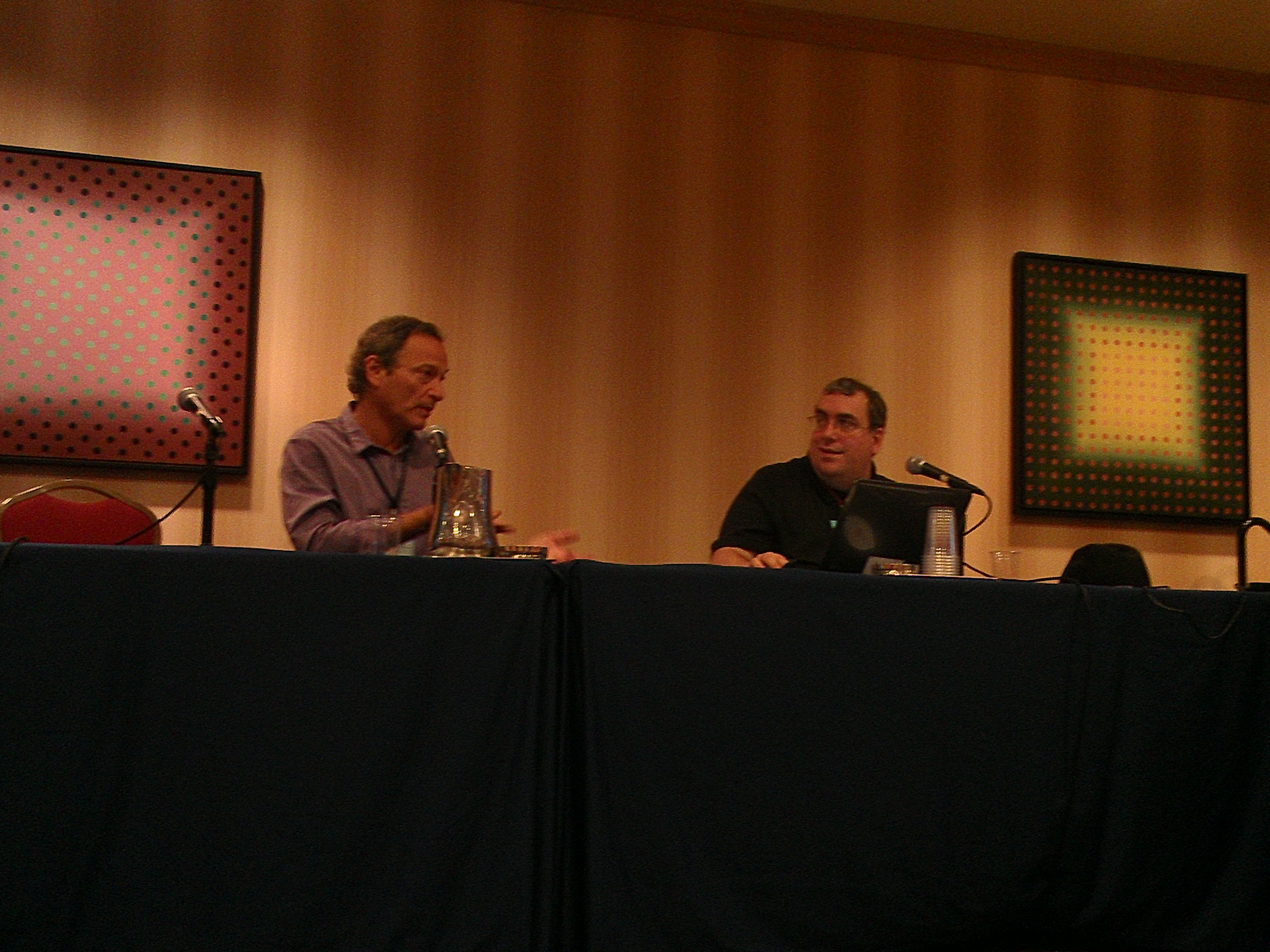
- Friedman (left) with Rob Clough in 2014
- Occupations: Cartoonist, illustrator
- Known for: Cartooning, painting, illustration
- Relatives: Josh Alan Friedman (brother); Bruce Jay Friedman (father)

Drew Friedman is an American cartoonist and illustrator who first gained renown for his humorous artwork and "stippling"-like style of caricature, employing thousands of pen-marks to simulate the look of a photograph. In the mid-1990s, he switched to painting.

Friedman's work has appeared in such periodicals as Entertainment Weekly, Newsweek, Time, The New York Times, The Wall Street Journal, The New Yorker, The New Republic, The New York Observer, Esquire, RAW, Rolling Stone, The Village Voice, Mineshaft, and Mad. His works have been anthologized in seven collections, and he has illustrated a number of books, including Howard Stern's Private Parts and Miss America, as well as books of portraits released under his own name.

== Biography ==
Since the 1990s, Friedman has provided caricature illustrations for mainstream publications. However, he first attracted public attention in the 1980s producing morbid alternative comics stories, sometimes working solo, sometimes with his brother Josh Alan Friedman scripting the panels. These stories portrayed celebrities and character actors of yesteryear in seedy, absurd, tragi-comic situations. The brothers also wrote stories about talk-show host Joe Franklin, including one strip, written by Drew, for Heavy Metal, "The Incredible Shrinking Joe Franklin", that prompted Franklin to sue the artist for $40 million. The suit was later dismissed. Novelist Kurt Vonnegut Jr. compared his work to Goya's.

The Friedman brothers were first published in RAW Magazine. Working with and without his brother, Drew's comics were published in Heavy Metal, Weirdo, High Times, National Lampoon and other comics anthologies from the 1980s into the early 1990s. The brothers published two collections, Any Similarity to Persons Living or Dead is Purely Coincidental and Warts and All. In a Comics Journal interview, Drew Friedman lamented that he and his brother had failed to earn a living creating work that was time- and labor-intensive yet earned little. Josh gave up comics to become a journalist and a musician.

Beginning in 1986, Drew illustrated a monthly feature, "Private Lives of Public Figures," for Spy; these illustrations were compiled in a book published by St. Martin's Press in 1992. He also provided illustrations for Howard Stern's two best-selling books, Private Parts and Miss America. Friedman served as comics editor for the National Lampoon in 1991, introducing the works of Daniel Clowes and Chris Ware to a wider audience. Since 1994, he has provided regular front-page illustrations for The New York Observer.

In 2006, Friedman published Old Jewish Comedians (Fantagraphics Books), a collection of portraits of famous and forgotten Jewish comics of film and TV in their old age, about which Steven Heller, in The New York Times Book Review, wrote: "A festival of drawing virtuosity and fabulous craggy faces... Friedman might very well be the Vermeer of the Borscht Belt." A sequel, More Old Jewish Comedians (Fantagraphics Books), was published in 2008. A collection of newer work, The Fun Never Stops! was published by Fantagraphics in 2007.

Describing his illustration style in 2017, Friedman said it might not appeal to "people who find warts, pimples, wrinkles, flop-sweat, jowls, boils, rosacea, nose hairs, ear hairs, drool, baggy eyes, gin blossoms, moles, liver spots, neck waddles, nasal labia folds, crinkles, furrows, creases, puss, pustules, bumps, lumps, yellowing and/or rotting teeth, missing teeth, gums, dentures, saliva, double chins, triple chins, blotches, scars, lumps, zits, five o'clock shadows, folds, bulbous noses, craters, chapped lips, man-boobs, goiters, pock marks, whiteheads, blackheads, rashes, nose leakages, emasculations, calluses, scabs, balding/bald heads, nodules, freckles, protuberances, welts, carbuncles, papules, festers, and Shemp distasteful," adding, "Liver spots are my Ninas."

While continuing to accept commercial assignments, Friedman began working as a portrait fine artist. "It helps if I'm passionate about the subject I'm drawing," he said in a 2015 interview. "As I get older I have less patience to draw someone or something I have no connection to or don't really like, or hate, even a politician. I just don't like the idea of staring into the face of someone I detest for several days drawing him or her. It's unsettling."

Friedman was one of the artists photographed in his studio for The Artist Within: Book 2: Behind the Lines by photographer Greg Preston, published in 2017.

Friedman's portrait of Barack Obama appeared on the cover of the New Yorker on January, 26, 2009. Friedman's 2019 book All The Presidents featured portraits of 45 United States presidents.

Friedman is the subject of the 2024 documentary film Drew Friedman: Vermeer of the Borscht Belt.

== Education ==
Friedman attended New York's School of Visual Arts from 1978 to 1981. While there, he took classes from (among others) Will Eisner, Harvey Kurtzman, Edward Sorel, Art Spiegelman, Stan Mack and Arnold Roth. During his tenure at SVA, Friedman edited both Eisner and Kurtzman's year-end magazines of student work (Will Eisner's Gallery of New Comics and Kartunz, respectively) Friedman's classmates at SVA included Mark Newgarden, Mike Carlin and Kaz.

He is the son of author/satirist Bruce Jay Friedman.

== Awards ==
Friedman was recognized for his work with the National Cartoonists Society's Newspaper Illustration Award for 2000, and he was nominated again in 2002 and 2007. That organization also awarded Friedman their Magazine Illustration Award for 2000. In 2014, Friedman was awarded the Inkpot Award.

== Bibliography ==
- Any Similarity to Persons Living or Dead is Purely Coincidental (with Josh Alan Friedman) (Fantagraphics Books, 1997)
- Warts and All (with Josh Alan Friedman) (Fantagraphics Books, 1997)
- Old Jewish Comedians (Fantagraphics Books, 2006)
- The Fun Never Stops (Fantagraphics Books, 2007)
- More Old Jewish Comedians (Fantagraphics Books, 2008)
- Too Soon? Famous/Infamous Faces 1995-2010 (Fantagraphics Books, 2010)
- Drew Friedman's Sideshow Freaks (Blast Books, 2011)
- Even More Old Jewish Comedians (Fantagraphics Books, 2011)
- Heroes of the Comics (Fantagraphics Books, 2014)
- More Heroes of the Comics (Fantagraphics Books, 2016)
- Drew Friedman's Chosen people (Fantagraphics Books, 2017)
- All the Presidents (Fantagraphics Books, 2019)
- Maverix and Lunatix: Icons of Underground Comics (Fantagraphics Books, 2022)
- Schtick Figures: The Cool, the Comical, the Crazy (Fantagraphics Books, July 2024)
