= Splash (film) =

1984 film by Ron Howard

- Theatrical release poster
- Directed by: Ron Howard
- Screenplay by: Lowell Ganz; Babaloo Mandel; Bruce Jay Friedman
- Story by: Bruce Jay Friedman; Brian Grazer
- Produced by: Brian Grazer
- Starring: Tom Hanks; Daryl Hannah; Eugene Levy; John Candy
- Cinematography: Donald Peterman
- Edited by: Daniel P. Hanley; Mike Hill
- Music by: Lee Holdridge
- Production company: Touchstone Films
- Distributed by: Buena Vista Distribution Co.
- Release date: March 9, 1984
- Running time: 110 minutes
- Country: United States
- Language: English
- Budget: $11 million
- Box office: $69.8 million

Splash is a 1984 American romantic fantasy comedy film directed by Ron Howard, from a screenplay by Lowell Ganz, Babaloo Mandel, and Bruce Jay Friedman, and a story by Friedman and producer Brian Grazer. The film stars Tom Hanks, Daryl Hannah, John Candy, and Eugene Levy. Its plot involves a prosperous and hardworking young man who falls in love with a mysterious woman who is secretly a mermaid. The film was nominated for an Academy Award for Best Original Screenplay.

It is notable for being the first film released by Touchstone Pictures, a film label created by Walt Disney Studios that same year in an effort to release films targeted at adult audiences, with mature content not appropriate for the studio's flagship Walt Disney Pictures banner. Splash was critically and commercially successful, earning over $69 million on an $11 million budget, making it the tenth-highest-grossing film of 1984, and received praise for the acting, humor, and chemistry between Hanks and Hannah.

== Plot ==
In 1964, eight-year-old Allen Bauer and his family are taking a boat tour at Cape Cod, Massachusetts. Allen is fascinated by something below the surface and jumps overboard, even though he cannot swim. In the ocean, he encounters a young girl, and when they hold hands, he inexplicably is able to breathe underwater. However, Allen is pulled back to the surface, and the two are separated. Since no one else saw the girl, he comes to believe that the encounter was a near-death hallucination. After the boat pulls away, the young girl is revealed to be a mermaid.

Twenty years later, Allen, now 28, is the co-owner of a fruit and vegetable business in New York City with his womanizing older brother, Freddie. Throughout the years, Allen's relationships have failed as he subconsciously seeks the connection he shared with the mermaid. Depressed after his latest breakup, Allen returns to Cape Cod, where he encounters eccentric scientist Walter Kornbluth on a diving expedition. When his motorboat restarts, Allen falls into the sea and is knocked unconscious; his wallet drops onto the coral below. He wakes up on a beach in the presence of a beautiful, naked young woman who is unable to talk. After kissing Allen, the woman dives into the sea, where she transforms into a mermaid. While swimming underwater, she is sighted by Kornbluth.

The mermaid finds Allen's wallet and uses a sunken ship's charts to locate New York. She comes ashore naked at the Statue of Liberty and is arrested for indecent exposure. Using information from the wallet, the police contact Allen, and she is released into his care. The mermaid learns how to speak English from watching television and is eager to explore the city. Unable to say her real name in human language, she selects "Madison" from a Madison Avenue sign. Despite Madison's occasionally outlandish behavior, she and Allen fall in love. He proposes to her, and they plan to marry.

Meanwhile, after seeing a supermarket tabloid headline about the beautiful naked woman at the Statue of Liberty, Kornbluth realizes that the woman in question is the mermaid he encountered. He pursues the couple, soaking Madison with a hose and unmasking her identity. Madison is seized by government agents and taken to a secret lab, headed by Kornbluth's cold-hearted rival, Dr. Ross, for examination. As she withers away in captivity, Kornbluth learns that the scientists are planning to dissect her, causing him to regret his actions.

Allen is shocked by Madison's secret and initially rejects her, but when he voices his disillusionment to his brother, Freddie berates him, reminding him how happy he was with her. Realizing that he still loves Madison, Allen confronts Kornbluth, who agrees to help rescue her. Kornbluth, accompanied by Allen and Freddie impersonating Swedish scientists, enters the lab and smuggles Madison outside. Freddie stays behind to be arrested in Allen's place, while Kornbluth tries to stop military troops from catching the couple.

As they make it to New York Harbor, Madison tells Allen that he can survive underwater as long as he is with her, prompting him to realize that she was the girl he had met underwater as a child. She warns him that if he comes to live in the sea, he will never be able to return to land. Madison dives into the water as the troops close in on them. When they attempt to arrest Allen, he jumps in after her and she kisses him, gifting him the ability to swim and breathe underwater. Allen discards his jacket as the couple swims toward what appears to be an underwater kingdom.

== Cast ==
- Tom Hanks as Allen Bauer
  - David Kreps as young Allen Bauer
- Daryl Hannah as Madison
  - Shayla MacKarvich as young Madison
- Eugene Levy as Dr. Walter Kornbluth
- John Candy as Freddie Bauer
  - Jason Late as young Freddie Bauer
- Dody Goodman as Mrs. Stimler
- Shecky Greene as Mr. Buyrite
- Richard B. Shull as Dr. Ross
- Bobby Di Cicco as Jerry
- Howard Morris as Dr. Zidell
- Tony DiBenedetto as Tim, the doorman
- Patrick Cronin as Michaelson
- Charles Walker as Michaelson's partner
- David Knell as Claude
- Jeff Doucette as Junior
- Royce D. Applegate as Buckwalter
- Tony Longo as Augie
- Nora Denney as Ms. Stein
- Charles Macaulay as the President
- Joe Grifasi as Manny
- Lee Delano as Sergeant Lelandowski
- Migdia Varela as Wanda
- Than Wyenn as Mr. Ambrose
- Eileen Saki as Dr. Fujimoto
- Jodi Long as a reporter
- Bill Smitrovich as Ralph Bauer
- Nancy Raffa as Mary Bauer

Screenwriters Lowell Ganz and Babaloo Mandel both make cameo appearances in the film. Ganz plays Stan, the tour guide, in the scene set at the Statue of Liberty. Mandel plays Rudy, the man in charge of ice skate rentals who tackles Hanks' character when he tries to run out with his skates still on. Director Ron Howard's father, actor Rance Howard, can be seen early in the film as Mr. McCullough, an unhappy customer screaming at Allen about his cherries. Howard's brother Clint Howard appears as a wedding guest, identified by Candy's character as the bride's brother and yelled at by Hanks.

== Production ==
The film was initially set up at United Artists, but Brian Grazer decided to take the film elsewhere and took it to The Ladd Company, but Alan Ladd Jr. eventually passed on it. According to the documentary on the Splash: 20th Anniversary Edition DVD in 2004, Grazer had pitched the film to numerous studios but was turned down repeatedly until Walt Disney Productions, then headed by Ron W. Miller, agreed to produce the film. The key to the proposal's success was that Grazer changed the premise description from the idea of a mermaid adjusting to life in New York City to that about a love story about an ordinary man in New York City meeting a mermaid. An issue at the time of production was the competition between Splash and another announced (but untitled) mermaid film from Warner Bros. that had lined up Warren Beatty as its star. Director Ron Howard promised the studio that Splash would be filmed more quickly and cheaply than the other film, which eventually fell through. Howard turned down directing Footloose and Mr. Mom to direct Splash.

Several established actors such as Chevy Chase, Dudley Moore, Bill Murray and John Travolta were considered for the lead role before the producers decided on the then lesser-known Tom Hanks. Hanks was cast because Lowell Ganz and Babaloo Mandel believed that he would be great as an "every man" character. According to Howard, the studio would not give him a green light. Murray turned down the part as he wanted to move away from comedies and do serious films instead. Steve Guttenberg also auditioned for the role. Michael Keaton was offered the role, but he declined so he could star in Mr. Mom instead. Before Daryl Hannah was cast as Madison, the role had been previously turned down by P.J. Soles, Tatum O'Neal, Michelle Pfeiffer, Julia Louis-Dreyfus, Melanie Griffith, Diane Lane, Kathleen Turner, and Sharon Stone. Lane was insecure about the nudity required for the role and chose to do Streets of Fire and The Cotton Club instead.

Principal photography, which ran from March 1 to June 30, 1983, took place in Los Angeles, New York City, and Gorda Cay, an isle in the Bahamas since purchased by Disney and renamed Castaway Cay. Donald Peterman served as the film's cinematographer, with Jon Fauer serving as camera operator for the film's New York scenes.

Hannah's mermaid tail was designed and created by Academy Award-winning visual effects artist Robert Short. The tail was fully functional. Hannah swam with the mermaid tail so fast that her safety team could not keep pace with her. According to the DVD documentary, Hannah had been swimming "mermaid" style with her legs bound together since she was a child, due to her fascination with Hans Christian Andersen's "The Little Mermaid" story. However, the exceptionally detailed film tail was difficult to remove. For the sake of efficiency, Hannah at first kept it on while the cast had lunch. In the documentary included on the 20th-anniversary Splash DVD, Hanks recalled how the other cast members would drop French fries over the side of the tank to her as though she were a trained sea mammal, because she could not leave the water while her legs were "shrink-wrapped".

== Release ==
=== Box office ===
Produced on a $11 million budget, Splash grossed $6,174,059 on its opening weekend and finished its run with a gross of $69.8 million in the United States and Canada, making it the tenth highest-grossing film of 1984.

== Reception ==
=== Critical response ===
The film was well received by critics and is considered to be one of the best films of 1984. On the review aggregator website Rotten Tomatoes, the film holds an approval rating of 91% based on 44 reviews, with an average rating of 6.9/10. The website's critics consensus reads, "A perfectly light, warmly funny romantic comedy that's kept afloat by Ron Howard's unobtrusive direction and charming performances from Tom Hanks and Daryl Hannah." Metacritic, which uses a weighted average, assigned the film a score of 71 out of 100, based on 15 critics, indicating "generally favorable reviews".

One of the film's few negative reviews came from Roger Ebert of the Chicago Sun-Times, who gave the film 1.5 stars out of 4 and thought the film's biggest failing was casting then-unknown Hanks as the lead rather than the established comedy actor John Candy: "They should have made Candy the lover, and Hanks the brother. Then we'd be on the side of this big lunk who suddenly has a mermaid drop into his life." Colin Greenland of Imagine magazine stated that "Splash is an adult film that has the grace to treat fantasy with sensitivity and a sense of humour."

Duane Byrge of The Hollywood Reporter wrote in his review: "Splash, the story of a lovelorn bachelor who falls in love with a mermaid, deserves high marks both for technical verisimilitude and artistic merit. It's a rambunctious comedy, coming from director Ron Howard who, with his previous, wacky Night Shift, unarguably shows that beneath that Opie Taylor/Richie Cunningham persona, there's a wild and crazy spirit." Janet Maslin of The New York Times wrote in her review: "Splash could have been shorter, but it probably couldn't have been much sweeter. Only purists will quibble with the blissfully happy ending, which has the lovers swimming through a shimmering underwater paradise that is supposed to be the bottom of the East River."

=== Accolades ===
Award	Year	Category	Recipient(s)	Result	Ref.
Youth in Film Awards	1984	Best Family Motion Picture – Musical or Comedy	Splash	Nominated	
Academy Awards	1985	Best Original Screenplay	Lowell Ganz, Babaloo Mandel, Bruce Jay Friedman, and Brian Grazer	Nominated	
Golden Globe Awards	1985	Best Motion Picture – Musical or Comedy	Splash	Nominated	
National Society of Film Critics	1985	Best Screenplay	Lowell Ganz, Babaloo Mandel, and Bruce Jay Friedman	Won	
Saturn Awards	1985	Best Fantasy Film	Splash	Nominated	
Saturn Awards	1985	Best Actress	Daryl Hannah	Won	
Saturn Awards	1985	Best Supporting Actor	John Candy	Nominated	
Saturn Awards	1985	Best Director	Ron Howard	Nominated	
Saturn Awards	1985	Best Make-up	Robert J. Schiffer	Nominated	
Writers Guild of America Awards	1985	Best Screenplay Written Directly for the Screenplay	Lowell Ganz, Babaloo Mandel, and Bruce Jay Friedman	Nominated	

== Soundtrack releases ==
A soundtrack album of Lee Holdridge's music for the film was released on both vinyl LP and cassette in the United Kingdom by Cherry Lane Records Ltd in 1984, with the music re-recorded by the Royal Philharmonic Orchestra conducted by the composer and the love theme song covered by Kira McClelland. Both have been out of print for many years. The catalogue numbers for these releases were PIPLP 710 and ZCPIP 710 respectively. In 2000, the original music was released on a 26-track CD in the United States by Super Tracks Music Group. The back cover states that this product is "For Promotional Use Only" and that it has been "Manufactured for the composer...". Although this release is very hard to find brand new and may in fact be out of print, it is still obtainable from certain film soundtrack specialist retailers and also occasionally used from certain online stores. This CD has every track that the LP and cassette have but has a considerably longer running length due to the 12 extra tracks. These extra tracks include more of the original music from the film, the theme song (by Lee Holdridge and Will Jennings) sung by Rita Coolidge and alternate versions of some of the tracks which appear on the LP and Cassette. The catalogue number for this release is LH CD – 02.

=== Cherry Lane album track listing ===
1. "Love Came for Me (Love Theme)" (2:34)
2. "Madison in Bloomingdale's" (1:37)
3. "Mermaid on the Beach" (2:32)
4. "Underwater" (2:20)
5. "Reflection" (1:03)
6. "Rainy Night" (2:40)
7. "Face to Face" (1:25)
8. "Escape and Chase" (2:54)
9. "Madison and Allen" (3:04)
10. "Moonlit Night" (2:56)
11. "Daydream" (0:55)
12. "Raid on a Museum" (0:50)
13. "The Leap to Freedom" (3:35)
14. "Return Home" (1:23)
15. "Love Came for Me (Vocal)" (3:20)
16. "Love Came for Me (Solo Piano)" (1:46)

=== Super Tracks album track listing ===
1. "Main Title" (1:51)
2. "First Meeting" (1:33)
3. "The Boat/Mermaid on the Beach" (2:34)
4. "Underwater – Version No. 1" (1:29)
5. "Underwater – Version No. 2" (1:25)
6. "Daydream" (0:57)
7. "Madison at Bloomingdale's" (1:09)
8. "In the Bar" (2:12)
9. "Late at Night" (2:35)
10. "Watching TV" (1:24)
11. "I Love You" (1:41)
12. "Rainy Night" (2:38)
13. "All Wet" (1:07)
14. "Sneak Attack" (1:03)
15. "Raid on a Museum" (0:43)
16. "Reunion" (1:21)
17. "Escape and Chase" (2:55)
18. "The Leap for Freedom" (2:20)
19. "Return Home" (2:14)
20. "Love Came for Me (Love Theme) – Rita Coolidge" (4:30)
21. "End Title" (3:07)
22. "Rainy Night – Version No. 2" (2:37)
23. "Escape and Chase – Film Version" (2:54)
24. "The Leap for Freedom – Film Version" (2:20)
25. "Love Came for Me – Solo Sax Version" (2:36)
26. "Love Came for Me – Solo Guitar Version" (3:48)

== Impact and legacy ==
The film's title served as inspiration for the name of Disney's theme park ride Splash Mountain. While the studio was coming out with the film, the Disney Imagineers were working on the ride, which was originally intended to be called Zip-a-Dee River Run. However, the studio executives requested that the ride be called Splash Mountain in order to promote the film, after their previous request for the Imagineers to include Hannah's mermaid character in the ride was declined.

Steven Levitt and Stephen Dubner's book Freakonomics (2006) credits the film with popularizing the name Madison for girls, as does Steven Pinker's The Stuff of Thought (2007). In the film, Hannah's character takes her name from Madison Avenue (itself named after President James Madison) after walking past a road sign. Hanks' character comments that "Madison's not a name" as, at the time, it was an extremely rare first name for a woman. However, in the years since the film was released in theaters and re-released on VHS and then DVD, the name's popularity has skyrocketed.

According to the Social Security Administration, the name Madison was the 216th most popular name in the United States for girls in 1990, the 29th most popular name for girls in 1995, and the third most popular name for girls in 2000. In 2005, the name cracked the top 50 most popular girls' names in the United Kingdom, and articles in British newspapers credit the film for the popularization. In a 2014 interview, Hannah commented on the name's popularity:

It's funny because no one understands the irony, because the whole point of me choosing that name was because it [was such a] silly name ... Obviously everyone knew it as the name of the street. No one really saw it as a first name and that was a joke. And now, of course it's not funny at all. It's just like, 'Oh, what a beautiful name!' ... It was funny at the time and now it's not even ironic.

=== Spin-offs ===
- Splash, Too (directed by Greg Antonacci), is a television film released in 1988 starring Todd Waring as Allen Bauer, Amy Yasbeck as Madison, and Donovan Scott as Freddie Bauer. One member of the original cast, Dody Goodman, the Bauers' office assistant Mrs. Stimler, reprises her role.
- A novelization of the film, written by Ian Marter (under the pen name Ian Don), was published by Target Books in the United Kingdom.

== Remake ==
In June 2016, producer Brian Grazer announced that he was working on a remake of Splash, although this version would be told from the point of view of the mermaid, which was more in line with earlier drafts of the original film. Jillian Bell and Channing Tatum were set to star as a human and a merman, respectively. Tatum was also set to produce the remake through his production company, Free Association, along with Reid Carolin and Peter Kieran, while Howard and Grazer will also produce from Imagine Entertainment with Anna Culp as the executive producer and Marja-Lewis Ryan writing. As of January 2019, the project was still in development. In February 2023, it was reported that Sarah Rothschild would write the script.

== See also ==
- Laal Paree
- Mermaids in popular culture
- Sahasa Veerudu Sagara Kanya
