= Pauline Brailsford =

English actress, teacher

- Born: Pauline Alethea Brailsford; 7 December 1928 (age 97); Ecclesall, South Yorkshire, England
- Occupation: Actress
- Years active: 1952–1996
- Spouse: John Homi
- Children: 2

Pauline Alethea Brailsford (born 7 December 1928) is an English retired actress and director.

Her best-known film performance was A League of Their Own as the team's chaperone Miss Cuthburt, for which she shared a 1993 MTV Movie Award nomination with Tom Hanks for Best Kiss. She taught theatre studies at Columbia College in Chicago, and she was the artistic director of the Body Politic theatre company in Chicago in the 1980s and early 1990s.

== Filmography ==
- Chicago Story (1981, TV)
- Vital Signs (1986, TV)
- Under the Biltmore Clock (TV, 1986)
- Big Shots (1987)
- A League of Their Own (1992)
- Murder, She Wrote (1 episode, 1993)
- Coach (1 episode, 1994)
- To Sir, with Love II (TV series, 1 episode, 1996)
