= Matia Karrell =

American film director

- Born: Boston, Massachusetts, U.S.
- Education: Harvard University, Brooklyn Academy of Music
- Occupations: Film/television director, producer, screenwriter
- Years active: 1987–present

Matia Anne Karrell is an American film and television director, producer, and screenwriter. She is best known for directing the 1988 short film Cadillac Dreams, which was nominated for an Academy Award for Best Short Film.

== Career ==
Karrell is a native of Boston, Massachusetts, born of Lebanese parents. She had aspirations to pursue a career as a dancer, attending the dance program at Harvard University. She then moved to New York City, where she trained under dancers Hanya Holm and Martha Graham. She performed at the Brooklyn Academy of Music (BAM) with renowned theater director, visual artist, and playwright Robert Wilson, in The Dollar Value of Man.

Karrell eventually left choreography and dance to pursue interests in the film industry. She worked as an electrician in her earlier films such as Without Warning (1980), The Howling (1981), China Lake (1983), and Dreamscape (1984). She then moved on to assistant director in Breakin' (1984), Making the Grade (1984), Critters, (1986) Matewan (1987) and Far North (1988). She was Spike Lee's Production Manager in his film School Daze (1988). In 1988, Karrell wrote, directed, and produced the live-action short film Cadillac Dreams, which was nominated for an Academy Award for Best Short Film and a Gold Hugo at the Chicago International Film Festival.

Karrell collaborated as a writer and producer with British director and producer Mike Newell at Dogstar Films, on developing "The Story of V". In 2002, she directed, co-wrote, and co-produced the full length feature film Behind the Red Door starring Kiefer Sutherland, Kyra Sedgwick and Stockard Channing, which took First Prize for Best Feature Film Screenplay at the Rhode Island International Film Festival and was a finalist in the PEN Center USA Literary Awards.

Among Karrell's long list of other film credits are Once Upon a Wedding (2005) starring Esai Morales and A Martinez, The Tub (2009) starring Melora Hardin and Dedee Pfeiffer, Finding Sahara (2014), Lilly and James (2016), Safety (2018), and The Tale (2018) starring Laura Dern, Ellen Burstyn and Elizabeth Debicki.

Karrell also worked on episodic television, directing episodes of The Wonder Years, Doogie Howser, M.D., Parenthood, Sweet Valley High, The West Wing, American Heiress and Army Wives.

Recently, Karrell collaborated with directors Luann Barry, Marty Elcan, Liz Hinlein, and Paige Morrow Kimball, on Cal State University Northridge (CSUN) gender and women’s studies professor, Dianne Bartlow's film, Making LA Happen. The film was produced "with the goal of turning gender stereotypes on their head and normalizing women in top-level government jobs.". The film was well-received and earned the 2017 Radio, Television/Cable International CINDY Silver Award.

Karrell has received a number of prestigious fellowships including the Fulbright, John Wells Directing Fellowship, American Film Institute (AFI) Women Director's Fellowship, and the Disney-ABC Directing Fellowship, and is a member of the Directors Guild of America, Writers Guild of America, Women in Film and Television International, American Film Institute, Alliance of Women Directors, and GreenLight Women.

She is a professor in the Graduate Directing Film Program at the ArtCenter College of Design in Pasadena, CA, and is the Owner/Founder of THE RED DOOR FILMS, based in Los Angeles.
