= Caitlin Ryan (social worker) =

American clinical social worker

Caitlin Ryan is a clinical social worker who is considered a pioneer in research related to LGBTQ health and mental health.

Ryan is the director of the Family Acceptance Project (FAP), "a research, intervention, education and policy initiative that works to prevent health and mental health risks for LGBTQ children and youth" based out of the Marian Wright Edelman Institute at San Francisco State University.

Ryan has been called "an LGBT family whisperer. ... (Her) evidence-based family intervention model has turned the world of LGBT healthcare on its head. It embraces not only disapproving families, but also cultures and faith traditions that are inhospitable to LGBT kids. Overcoming these rifts is crucial to the physical and mental health of LGBT youth, and it can be done, Ryan argues, without asking the family to disregard their religious or cultural values."

== Education ==
Ryan's undergraduate work was done at Hunter College with a concentration in human sexuality. She continued her education to obtain a master's degree in clinical social work from Smith College School for Social Work, and a doctorate in public policy with a focus on health policy from Virginia Commonwealth University.

She spent the 1970s organizing among the community of LGBTQ health care providers before she decided to return to school for her MSW. She had problems finding a program that would accept her, despite her credentials because she was an "out lesbian." Smith was the only school that accepted her. As part of her training, she was sent to Atlanta and worked for AID Atlanta. She arrived in 1980, at the beginning of the AIDS epidemic. She started out as a volunteer, rose to vice president and when she graduated in 1982, their first executive director.

== Research ==
Ryan and Rafael Diaz began a study in 2002 to evaluate the health effects, both mental and physical, on children whose parents rejected them or tried to "fix" them. The results of their study were published in The Journal of Pediatrics and showed that those children "are more than 8 times as likely to attempt suicide, nearly 6 times as likely to report high levels of depression and more than 3 times as likely to use illegal drugs and be at high risk for HIV and STDs."

== Publications ==
- A Practitioner’s Resource Guide: Helping Families to Support Their LGBT Children. Published by the Substance Abuse and Mental Health Services Administration, HHS
- "School Bullying, Violence Against Lesbian, Gay, Bisexual & Transgender Youth Linked With Risk for Suicide, HIV and STDs in Young Adulthood"
- "How Do I Know If My Child Is Transgender?"
