= Lowell Ganz =

American screenwriter (born 1948)

- Born: August 31, 1948 (age 77); New York City, New York, U.S.
- Occupations: Writer, producer
- Years active: 1973–present
- Spouse: Jeanne Russo (m. 1976)
- Children: 3

Lowell Ganz (born August 31, 1948) is an American writer and producer. He is the long-time writing partner of Babaloo Mandel and has written for television, film, and theatre.

Ganz grew up in a Jewish family in Queens, New York, attending Martin Van Buren High School in Queens Village. He dropped out of college and moved to Los Angeles, California to pursue a career writing for sitcoms, starting with The Odd Couple. From there, he moved on to writing for the TV series Happy Days and created two of its spin-off series, Laverne & Shirley and Joanie Loves Chachi.

In 1982, Ganz and Mandel teamed up with Happy Days actors Ron Howard and Henry Winkler to make their first film, the low-budget comedy Night Shift, which was also actor Michael Keaton's first film; Howard signed on because he wanted to start directing while Winkler wanted to move away from his image as the Fonz. Ganz's second film outing, Splash, made stars of Tom Hanks and Daryl Hannah and earned him an Academy Award nomination for Best Original Screenplay.

Ganz and Mandel went on to write several other films, four more of which were also directed by Howard, and one of which had Penny Marshall, who starred in Laverne and Shirley, as director. Four of their films have featured Billy Crystal, three have featured Michael Keaton, two have featured Tom Hanks, and two are about baseball. Ganz and Mandel are also widely used as Hollywood script doctors, known for their reliability and fast turnaround time.

Ganz lives in Los Angeles with his wife of more than 45 years. They have three children.

== Screenwriting credits (in collaboration with Babaloo Mandel) ==
- Night Shift (1982)
- Splash (with Bruce Jay Friedman, 1984) - Oscar nomination for Best Original Screenplay
- Spies Like Us (with Dan Aykroyd, 1985)
- Gung Ho (1986)
- Vibes (1988)
- Parenthood (with Ron Howard, 1989)
- City Slickers (1991)
- Mr. Saturday Night (with Billy Crystal, 1992)
- A League of Their Own (1992)
- Greedy (1994)
- City Slickers II: The Legend of Curly's Gold (with Billy Crystal, 1994)
- Forget Paris (with Billy Crystal, 1995)
- Multiplicity (with Chris Miller and Mary Hale, 1996)
- Father's Day
- EDtv (1999)
- Where the Heart Is (2000)
- Robots (with David Lindsay-Abaire, 2005)
- Fever Pitch (2005) (adapted from the Nick Hornby book)
- Tooth Fairy (with Joshua Sternin, Jennifer Ventimilia and Randi Mayem Singer, 2010)

== Selected television credits ==
- Hiller and Diller - co-creator, writer, executive producer
- Joanie Loves Chachi - creator, writer, and producer
- Laverne and Shirley - co-creator, writer, and producer
- Busting Loose - co-creator, writer, and executive producer
- Happy Days - writer and supervising producer
- The Odd Couple - writer
