= Babaloo Mandel =

American screenwriter (born 1949)

- Born: Marc Alan Mandel; October 13, 1949 (age 76); New York City, New York, U.S.
- Occupations: Writer, producer
- Years active: 1973–present
- Spouse: Denise Madelyn Horn (m. 1974)
- Children: 6

Marc Alan "Babaloo" Mandel (born October 13, 1949) is an American writer and producer. He first wrote episodic television comedy, then transitioned to writing feature films and theatre. He and long-time writing partner Lowell Ganz wrote numerous high-profile films including Splash (1984), Parenthood (1989), City Slickers (1991), and A League of Their Own (1992).

== Biography ==
Mandel was born in New York City. His father was a taxi driver. He attended Queens College, City University of New York, before leaving for Hollywood in 1972.

At Queens College, Mandel met Lowell Ganz, who nicknamed him "Babaloo", after the character Ba-ba-lu Mandel in Philip Roth's novel Portnoy's Complaint. In 2006, Mandel and Ganz were featured in The Dialogue interview series. In the 90-minute interview with producer Michael De Luca, they discussed their 40-year partnership as it evolved from television to feature films.

Both men worked on the television series Happy Days, Mandel as a creative consultant, Ganz as supervising producer. As a result of that connection, they were offered their first big break, the movie Night Shift, by series star Ron Howard and his friend, producer Brian Grazer. Howard directed Night Shift, and it was Grazer's first feature film as producer. The writing duo later teamed up again with Howard on Splash, for which Mandel, Ganz, and Bruce Jay Friedman won the National Society of Film Critics Award for Best Screenplay. Mandel, Ganz, Friedman, and Grazer were also nominated for the Academy Award for Best Original Screenplay.

The pair also wrote for the television series Laverne & Shirley. They were the screenwriters for the 1992 sports movie A League of Their Own, directed by Penny Marshall.

He married Denise Madelyn Horn in 1974. They have six children, including a set of triplets.

The Online Archive of California houses the Lowell Ganz & Babaloo Mandel Collection of material related to their writing careers.

== Screenwriting credits (in Collaboration with Lowell Ganz) ==
- Night Shift (1982)
- Splash (with Bruce Jay Friedman, 1984) - Oscar nomination for Best Original Screenplay
- Spies Like Us (with Dan Aykroyd, 1985)
- Gung Ho (1986)
- Vibes (1988)
- Parenthood (with Ron Howard, 1989)
- City Slickers (1991)
- Mr. Saturday Night (with Billy Crystal, 1992)
- A League of Their Own (1992)
- Greedy (1994)
- City Slickers II: The Legend of Curly's Gold (with Billy Crystal, 1994)
- Forget Paris (1995, with Billy Crystal)
- Multiplicity (with Chris Miller and Mary Hale, 1996)
- Fathers' Day (1997)
- EDtv (1999)
- Where the Heart Is (2000)
- Robots (with David Lindsay-Abaire, 2005)
- Fever Pitch (2005) (adapted from the Nick Hornby book)
- Tooth Fairy (with Joshua Sternin, Jennifer Ventimilia and Randi Mayem Singer, 2010)

== Partial television credits ==
- Busting Loose (1977)
- Laverne & Shirley (1977–78)
- Happy Days (1981)
