= Jasen Fisher =

American actor (born 1980)

- Born: May 8, 1980 (age 46); Chicago, Illinois, U.S.
- Education: William Fremd High School (1998)
- Occupation: Actor
- Years active: 1989–1991

Jasen Lee Fisher (born May 8, 1980) is an American former child actor.

== Career ==
Fisher made his first film appearance in Parenthood (1989) as Kevin Buckman alongside Steve Martin and Rick Moranis, receiving a nomination for a Young Artist Award as a supporting actor. He portrayed the main character of Luke in The Witches (1990) alongside Rowan Atkinson and Anjelica Huston, for which he was nominated for the Saturn Award for Best Performance by a Younger Actor.

At the age of 11, he portrayed Ace (one of the Lost Boys) in the film Hook (1991) alongside Robin Williams and Julia Roberts, for which the cast received the Outstanding Young Ensemble Cast – Feature Film award at the 1991–92 Youth in Film Awards. He has had no further screen credits since.

== Personal life ==
Fisher attended William Fremd High School in Palatine, Illinois, graduating in the Class of 1998.

== Filmography ==
Year	Title	Role	Notes
1989	Parenthood	Kevin Buckman	
1990	The Witches	Luke	Nominated – Saturn Award for Best Performance by a Younger Actor
1991	Hook	Ace	
