= 3 Ninjas =

1992 American film franchise

- Years: 1992–1998

Films and television
- Films: 3 Ninjas; 3 Ninjas Kick Back; 3 Ninjas Knuckle Up; 3 Ninjas: High Noon at Mega Mountain

3 Ninjas
- Directed by: Jon Turteltaub (1); Charles T. Kanganis (2); Simon S. Sheen (3); Sean McNamara (4)
- Written by: 3 Ninjas; Kenny Kim; Edward Emanuel; 3 Ninjas Kick Back; Sang-ok Shin; Mark Saltzman; 3 Ninjas Knuckle Up; Alex S. Kim; 3 Ninjas: High Noon at Mega Mountain; Sean McNamara; Jeff Phillipsee
- Produced by: Martha Chang; James Kang
- Starring: Victor Wong
- Cinematography: Richard Michalak (1); Christopher Faloona (2); Eugene Shluglet (3); Blake T. Evans (4)
- Edited by: David Rennie (1); David Rennie; Jeffrey Reiner (2); Pam Choules (3); Annamaria Szanto (4)
- Music by: Richard Marvin (1 & 2); Gary Stevan Scott (3); John Coda (4)
- Production companies: Touchstone Pictures (1); Sheen Productions (2-4)
- Distributed by: Buena Vista Pictures (1); TriStar Pictures (2-4)
- Release dates: August 7, 1992 (3 Ninjas); May 6, 1994 (Kick Back); April 7, 1995 (Knuckle Up); April 10, 1998 (High Noon)
- Running time: 355 minutes
- Country: United States
- Language: English
- Budget: $26.5 million (first two films)
- Box office: $41.6 million

3 Ninjas is a series of action comedy family films about the adventures of three young brothers who are trained by their Japanese grandfather in the art of ninjutsu. Victor Wong is the only cast member to appear in all four films.

== Characters ==
=== Main characters ===
Mori "Shintarō" Tanaka — portrayed by Victor Wong in all 4 films.

- Grandfather and sensei to Rocky, Colt, and Tum-Tum. A veteran ninja originally from Japan. As a youth, he learned ninjutsu from his father and won a tournament in which he was awarded a special dagger. Upon immigrating to the United States, he met his wife and they had a daughter, Jessica. Around that time, he was training pupils in ninjutsu and went into business with one of his students, Hugo Snyder, but ended their partnership upon realizing Snyder's true intentions and criminal activities. He resides at his cabin in the woods in the outskirts of town.

Samuel "Rocky" Douglas Jr. — portrayed by Michael Treanor (3 Ninjas and 3 Ninjas Knuckle Up), Sean Fox (3 Ninjas Kick Back), and Mathew Botuchis (3 Ninjas: High Noon at Mega Mountain)

- Born 1979 and 1983, the eldest brother. Grandpa gives him the ninja name "Rocky" because he is as strong as granite and is a level-headed leader, but at times, is a real womanizer. His trademark color is green.

Jeffrey "Colt" Douglas — portrayed by Max Elliott Slade (3 Ninjas, 3 Ninjas Kick Back and 3 Ninjas Knuckle Up). Michael O'Laskey II (3 Ninjas: High Noon at Mega Mountain)

- Born 1980 and 1983, the middle child. Grandpa gave him the ninja name "Colt" because he is "fast and free like the young wild horse". He is known for his shorter temper and sharp tongue. His trademark color is blue.

Michael "Tum-Tum" Douglas-portrayed by Chad Power (3 Ninjas and 3 Ninjas Knuckle Up), Evan Bonifant (3 Ninjas Kick Back), and James Paul Roeske II (3 Ninjas: High Noon at Mega Mountain)

- Born 1984 and 1989, the youngest brother. Grandpa gave him the ninja name "Tum-Tum" because his energy begins with his stomach. Known for his large appetite and fondness for sweets, especially carrying around jelly beans. His trademark colors have been yellow, orange, and red.

=== Supporting characters ===
Samuel "Sam" Douglas Sr. — portrayed by Alan McRae (3 Ninjas and 3 Ninjas Kick Back and 3 Ninjas: High Noon at Mega Mountain)

- A hardened FBI agent who married Jessica Tanaka, Mori's daughter, and fathered 3 boys, Samuel, Jeffrey, and Michael. Sam tolerates his sons spending time with their grandfather, but has a dislike for karate and other ninja tactics. Has a personal grudge with Hugo Snyder, a former student and business partner to Mori, and was determined to take him down. He also coaches the boys baseball team, the Dragons.

Jessica Tanaka-Douglas — portrayed by Margarita Franco (3 Ninjas and 3 Ninjas Kick Back and 3 Ninjas: High Noon at Mega Mountain)

- Mori's daughter who is married to FBI Agent Sam Douglas. She is the mother of Rocky, Colt, and Tum-Tum. While Sam disapproves of their sons being trained in ninjutsu, she encourages them to learn from her father. She referred to her father as "Special".

Emily — portrayed by Kate Sargeant (3 Ninjas)

- The Douglas boys neighbor and Rocky's childhood friend who seemingly had a crush on him. Colt and Tum-Tum give Rocky a hard time over her using the phrase "Rocky Loves Emily".

=== Antagonists ===
Hugo Snyder — portrayed by Rand Kingsley (3 Ninjas)

- An egotistic arms dealer whom Mori trained in ninjutsu and was in business with for a time. Their ties were cut short after Mori learned of his activities. He had a deal set up with an Islamic war criminal in the form of a missiles sale, and Mori's son-in-law, FBI Agent Sam Douglas, was hell-bent on taking him down. He failed to convince Mori to train his men and keep Sam off of his back, so he resorted to kidnapping Rocky, Colt, and Tum-Tum, aware that Mori also trained them, in order to hold some leverage on Agent Douglas. He owns a ship in the Harbor called the "Berth 6" where he runs his operations, trained his men, and held the boys captive. He later faced off with Tanaka in combat in which he had the upper hand but was defeated after Mori jammed Tum-Tums jelly beans into his mouth. Snyder refused to concede defeat as he drew an assault rifle on Mori and the Douglas boys, but was shot and wounded as Agent Douglas and the FBI took down the ninjas on the ship.

Mr. Nigel Brown — portrayed by Joel Swetow (3 Ninjas)

- Snyder's timid and flimsy consigliere. Unlike the rest of Snyder's boys, he is no fighter nor is he trained in ninjutsu. He is also Snyder's personal whipping boy while suited in body gear and training equipment whenever Snyder trains. He hires his surfer punk nephew, Fester, and his two buddies to kidnap Rocky, Colt, and Tum-Tum. When his nephew fails to do the job properly, he oversees Rushmore and Snyder's ninjas in capturing them. He is all around a pencil pusher and a coward who will run if cornered. He was arrested by the FBI along with the rest of Snyder's men but received an injury on his head after attempting to flee from Mori.

Rushmore — portrayed by Professor Toru Tanaka (3 Ninjas)

- Not much is known about Rushmore, except he is a personal strongman and enforcer working for Hugo Snyder. When Fester and his crew failed to capturing Rocky, Colt, and Tum-Tum, he personally stepped in to see the job done. He has immense strength in which he lacks weakness. The Douglas boys, remembering their training with practice dummy, lit up his eyes, incapacitating him.

== Films ==
=== 3 Ninjas (1992) ===
Each summer, Samuel, Jeffrey and Michael, three suburban California brothers, visit their grandfather Mori Tanaka's cabin in the desert to train to become ninjas. On their last day of summer vacation, the boys receive "ninja names": Samuel is Rocky because of his strength and levelheaded mentality, Jeffrey is Colt because of his speed and temper like a young wild horse, and Michael is Tum Tum due to his energy coming from his gluttony. They witness a confrontation between their grandfather and Hugo Snyder, ex-student/partner of Tanaka and a criminal who is being pursued by the boys' father, FBI agent Sam Douglas. Snyder plans to kidnap the boys with the help of his assistant Mr. Brown, who employs his irresponsible nephew Fester, and his friends Hammer and Marcus to abduct them. After a failed attempt at kidnapping foiled by the three boys outsmarting the three men while their parents are out, Mr. Brown and heavyweight fighter "Rushmore" appear and they easily capture the trio, leaving a note with Rocky's girlfriend Emily, telling Sam that Snyder has kidnapped his children in retaliation for his constant attempts to arrest him. Mori arrives at the house and Sam reluctantly agrees to give him one hour to rescue the children. Mori tracks the children to a ship at the docks where Snyder is training an army of ninjas and begins searching for the boys and Snyder. Meanwhile, the boys escape their containment cell using the training bestowed upon them by their Grandfather and begin fighting their way out of the ship, leading up to a final confrontation between Snyder and Mori. Mori wins, despite Snyder's foul play and Sam ambushes the ship with a slew of FBI agents, wounding Snyder and foiling his evil organization.

=== 3 Ninjas Kick Back (1994) ===
Rocky, Colt and Tum Tum are torn between seeing a championship baseball game through to the end or going to Japan to deliver a golden dagger to their grandfather; they choose the latter. On the way to Japan, they meet Miyo, a girl who Rocky is very fond of. When Koga gets the dagger and sword, he tries to open the cave of gold. Koga and Mori become friends and Miyo gets the dagger. During their Japanese adventure, the kids learn important skills and life lessons which help them win the final baseball game of their season, with Colt hitting a home run. A poor sport on the opposing team picks on them; Darren attempts to attack Miyo but ends up getting knocked unconscious during one of the final scenes.

=== 3 Ninjas Knuckle Up (1995) ===
Rocky, Colt and Tum Tum must battle an evil, wealthy toxic waste dumper in order to save a local Indigenous tribe and their friend Jo. The 3 Ninjas must help find Jo's father and find a secret disk that contains evidence that could stop the toxic landfill that is destroying the Indian community. However, the town is owned by the wealthy toxic waste dumper, and he controls the police and the mayor. The 3 Ninjas must fight a motorcycle gang and renegade cowboys, retrieve the secret disk and expose the wealthy baron of his misdeeds.

=== 3 Ninjas: High Noon at Mega Mountain (1998) ===
Rocky, Colt and Tum Tum - along with their neighbor friend, computer whiz Amanda - are visiting Mega Mountain amusement park when it is invaded by an army of ninjas led by master criminal Mary Ann "Medusa" Rogers. The boys have to thwart Medusa's vicious plans and liberate Mega Mountain.

== Cast and crew ==
=== Cast ===
List of 3 Ninjas characters, with their performers in each film
Character	3 Ninjas (1992)	3 Ninjas Kick Back (1994)	3 Ninjas Knuckle Up (1995)	3 Ninjas: High Noon at Mega Mountain (1998)
Mori Tanaka	Victor Wong	Victor Wong	Victor Wong	Victor Wong
Samuel "Rocky" Douglas Jr.	Michael Treanor	Sean Fox	Michael Treanor	Mathew Botuchis
Jeffrey "Colt" Douglas	Max Elliott Slade	Max Elliott Slade	Max Elliott Slade	Michael O'Laskey II
Michael "Tum Tum" Douglas	Chad Power	J. Evan Bonifant	Chad Power	James Paul "JP" Roeske II
Samuel Douglas Sr.	Alan McRae	Alan McRae		
Jessica Douglas	Margarita Franco	Margarita Franco		
Darren	Scott Caudill		Scott Caudill	
Emily	Kate Sargeant			
Hugo Snyder	Rand Kingsley			
Rushmore	Professor Toru Tanaka			
Mr. Nigel Brown	Joel Swetow			
Jo		Crystle Lightning		
Charlie		Donald L. Shanks		
Jack Harding		Charles Napier		
J.J.		Patrick Kilpatrick		
Jimmy		Donal Logue		
Eddy		Scott MacDonald		
Miyo			Caroline Junko King	
Koga			Sab Shimono	
"Glam"			Dustin Nguyen	
"Slam"			Angelo Tiffe	
Vinnie			Jason Schombing	
Ishikawa			Masashi "Killer Khan" Ozawa	
Dave Dragon				Hulk Hogan
Medusa				Loni Anderson
Lothar Zogg				Jim Varney
C.J.				Dwayne Carrington
Carl				Kirk Baily
Buelow				Travis McKenna
Zed				Brendan O'Brian
Jennifer				Lindsay Felton
Amanda				Chelsey Earlywine

== Reception ==
=== Box office performance ===
The first 3 Ninjas film was a box office success and was the only entry in the franchise to be released by Disney, through its Touchstone Pictures label. The rights to the franchise were subsequently acquired by Tristar Pictures, which released the three sequels, all of which were box office bombs. The first film developed a cult following and was released on DVD on June 3, 2003.

Film	Release date	Budget	Gross
3 Ninjas	August 7, 1992	$6.5 million	$29,000,301
3 Ninjas Kick Back	May 6, 1994	$20 million	$11,798,854
3 Ninjas Knuckle Up	April 7, 1995	—N/a	$413,479
3 Ninjas: High Noon at Mega Mountain	April 10, 1998	—N/a	$375,805
Total		$26.5 million	$41,588,439

=== Critical response ===
Film	Rotten Tomatoes
3 Ninjas	32% (22 reviews)
3 Ninjas Kick Back	15% (13 reviews)
3 Ninjas Knuckle Up	N/A (3 reviews)
3 Ninjas: High Noon at Mega Mountain	0% (6 reviews)
