= Endless Bummer =

Endless Bummer may refer to:

- "Endless Bummer", a 2008 album by Sloppy Seconds
- Endless Bummer, a 2009 American comedy film directed by Sam Pillsbury
- "Endless Bummer", a 1999 episode of season 2 of Johnny Bravo
- "Endless Bummer", a 2007 episode of season 2 of Tom and Jerry Tales
- "Endless Bummer", a 2016 song by Weezer from Weezer (White Album)
