= 3 Ninjas (film) =

1992 film by Jon Turteltaub

- Theatrical release poster
- Directed by: Jon Turteltaub
- Screenplay by: Edward Emanuel
- Story by: Kenny Kim
- Produced by: Martha Chang; Shunji Hirano; James Kang; Jason Ing; Yuriko Matsubara
- Starring: Victor Wong; Michael Treanor; Max Elliott Slade; Chad Power
- Cinematography: Richard Michalak
- Edited by: David Rennie
- Music by: Richard Marvin
- Production company: Touchstone Pictures
- Distributed by: Buena Vista Pictures Distribution
- Release date: August 7, 1992
- Running time: 84 minutes; 96 minutes (international version)
- Country: United States
- Language: English
- Budget: $2.5 million
- Box office: $29 million

3 Ninjas is a 1992 American martial arts comedy film directed by Jon Turteltaub and starring Victor Wong, Michael Treanor, Max Elliott Slade and Chad Power. It was the only 3 Ninjas film released by Touchstone Pictures, while the others were released by TriStar Pictures. The film is about three young brothers who learn martial arts from their Japanese grandfather. The film was released on August 7, 1992, and was preceded by the Bonkers D. Bobcat short Petal to the Metal (the pilot short of Raw Toonage) in theaters.

Despite receiving generally negative reviews from critics, it was a box office success grossing $29 million against a $2.5 million production budget. It spawned three less-successful sequels 3 Ninjas Kick Back, 3 Ninjas Knuckle Up, and 3 Ninjas: High Noon at Mega Mountain.

== Plot ==
Every summer, the Douglas brothers, 12-year-old Samuel, 11-year-old Jeffrey, and 6-year-old Michael, visit their grandfather, Mori Tanaka, at his cabin. Mori trains his grandsons in the art of ninjutsu. As the summer comes to an end, Mori bestows on each of them a new "ninja" name based on their personalities: Samuel being 'Rocky', Jeffrey being 'Colt', and Michael being 'Tum-Tum'.

The boys' father, Sam Douglas, is an FBI agent who stages a sting operation to entrap a master criminal named Hugo Snyder in the sale of warheads. Snyder evades the trap with his ninja henchmen, flees by helicopter, and later visits Mori, his former business partner. Mori is tested by Snyder's ninjas and defeats them with his grandsons' help. Face to face, Snyder fails to persuade Mori to train his men and threatens Mori's family if he does not tell Sam, his son-in-law, to cease pursuing him.

When the boys return home, they find their father unenthusiastic about what they learned during their visit and more annoyed by their new names. Emily, a friend of Rocky's, compliments his new name and agrees to ride with them to school the next day.

Snyder develops a plan to kidnap the brothers and use them as leverage against Sam to complete his missile sale. Snyder's consigliere, Nigel Brown, contacts his irresponsible nephew, Fester, a petty criminal surf punk, as well as his buddies, Hammer and Marcus, to kidnap the brothers, but their plans are put on hold due to the FBI's presence. The next day, Fester and his friends follow the brothers to school, but are sidetracked by a fender-bender involving a police car.

Emily becomes separated from the brothers and encounters a group of bullies who steal her bike. At recess, the brothers challenge the bullies to a two-on-two basketball game, giving the bullies a 9-point head start. Despite the bullies' dirty tactics, the brothers score ten consecutive points and win back Emily's bike. Meanwhile, Mori conducts recon on Snyder and his associates, tracking them to a ship, Berth 6, in the harbor.

That night, Colt learns that Snyder and Mori are old friends. Fester and his friends break into the house under the cover of a fake pizza order and subdue the boys' babysitter. Believing it to be a home invasion, the brothers suit up in their ninja gis and masks and fight back using their surroundings and numerous household items. After regrouping in the boys' bedroom, Fester uses Rocky's homemade phone to call Emily over and take her hostage, but the boys outsmart and defeat Fester's group, even spiking their soda with a laxative. After the babysitter is freed, the brothers are overpowered by Snyder's bodyguard, Rushmore, and taken captive aboard Snyder's ship, where they soon learn that their grandfather was Snyder's sensei. The brothers escape, putting the ship on high alert, and manage to subdue Rushmore and many of Snyder's ninjas, while Mori infiltrates the ship to rescue them.

Snyder confronts Mori in the ship dojo and challenges him to a fight for the brothers' freedom. Due to his youth and speed, and a hidden pepper bomb, Snyder gains the upper hand and is prepared to deliver the finishing blow, until Mori gags Snyder with some of Tum-Tum's jelly beans and finally defeats him. Enraged, Snyder grabs a gun from one of his subordinates and attempts to shoot Mori and the boys, but is suddenly shot in the shoulder by Sam, who arrives with his backup to arrest Snyder, Brown, and their henchmen. Sam tells his sons that he will let them continue to visit their grandfather every summer and takes the rest of the night off from work to get pizza with the family, including Mori, who hates pizza.

== Cast ==
- Victor Wong as Grandpa Mori Tanaka, the Douglas brothers grandfather who trained the boys in Ninjitsu
- Michael Treanor as Samuel "Rocky" Douglas Jr., the oldest of the Douglas brothers
- Max Elliott Slade as Jeffrey "Colt" Douglas, the middle of the Douglas brothers
- Chad Power as Michael "Tum-Tum" Douglas, the youngest of the Douglas brothers
- Rand Kingsley as Hugo Snyder, an arms dealer who was a former business partner and student to Mori
- Alan McRae as Samuel Douglas Sr., the Douglas boys father who is an FBI agent
- Margarita Franco as Jessica Tanaka-Douglas, the Douglas boys mother and Mori's daughter
- Kate Sargeant as Emily, a neighbor to the Douglas boys and Rocky's crush
- Joel Swetow as Mr. Nigel Brown, Snyder's consigliere
- Professor Toru Tanaka as Rushmore, Snyder's enforcer
- Patrick Labyorteaux as Fester, Brown's nephew and leader of a trio of surfer punks hired to abduct the Douglas boys
- Race Nelson as Marcus, member of Festers crew
- D.J. Harder as "Hammer", member of Festers crew
- Clifton Powell as FBI Agent Jerry Kurl, Sam's partner
- Scott Caudill as Darren, the leader of a pack of bullies known to steal bicycles
- Baha Jackson as Bully

== Production ==
South Korean filmmaker Shin Sang-ok and his wife Choi Eun-hee moved to Los Angeles in 1989 after living under the protection of the Central Intelligence Agency for the past three years following his escape from North Korea. Shin got the idea for 3 Ninjas after repeatedly watching Home Alone and developed a desire to do something similar and incorporate martial arts. Shin, who had taken the anglicized name Simon Sheen developed the story with his writing partner Kenny Kim before writing the first draft in Korean before translating it to English. An additional rewrite was performed by Edward Emanuel to tailor the film for American audiences. Over 100 children from various martial arts competitions auditioned for the lead roles in the film before Michael Treanor, Max Elliott Slade, and Chad Power were cast, and along with Victor Wong underwent several weeks worth of training in Tai chi and usage of martial arts weapons. Walt Disney Pictures acquired distribution rights to the film for $2 million and retitled it from 3 Ninja Kids to 3 Ninjas. Jon Turteltaub recalled his time working on the film positively and became friends with Shin during production, however Turtletaub did note some eccentricities such as their first meeting where he was discussing the script with Shin through a translator with Turtletaub inquiring if Shin had fallen asleep only to be corrected by the translator that Shin was thinking.

== Release ==
=== International version ===
The international cut of the film features a number of small parts of scenes that were cut from the film for its American release, most likely to ensure a PG rating. Among the cut scenes are (not all-inclusive): extra footage of Snyder's escape in which he discovers the money during the sting to be a fake while confronting two FBI agents whom he promptly defeats; a scene in which Fester fires a gun in the convenience store while Hammer and Marcus tie up the clerk behind the counter; a scene in which Fester gets the Douglas family address from Brown; additional footage of Grandpa trailing Snyder to his ship hideout; numerous small portions of the scene where the kidnappers invade the Douglas household, including Colt beating them after covering them under a tarp in the room being renovated; a scene of Fester asking his uncle (Brown) if he can be paid; extra sarcastic dialogue while the boys are locked up in Snyder's ship; and an extended scene in which the boys are reunited with Grandpa. Additionally, in the international version, the boys lose the basketball challenge and their bikes, so the film ends with a scene in which Rocky fights one of the bullies to get them back. The international cut is available on Vudu and can be purchased on Prime Video.

== Reception ==
=== Box office ===
The film opened at the box office in the #4 position, and by the end of its 6-week run in theaters grossed US$29,000,301 domestically. Considering that the film was budgeted at $2.5 million, it was a huge financial success, and turned out to be the most profitable film of the year in terms of cost-to-gross ratio.

=== Critical response ===
On Rotten Tomatoes the film has a 35% rating, based on 23 reviews. The site's consensus reads: "3 Ninjas might be exciting enough for younger action enthusiasts, but they deserve better -- and there's no shortage of superior options to choose from".

Stephen Holden of The New York Times said that "the film can't seem to make up its mind whether it wants to be a comedy, a fantasy or an adventure film" and that "beneath all the excitement, the message that 3 Ninjas conveys is anything but reassuring". It did attain a favorable response from Kevin Thomas of the Los Angeles Times, who said that "although their attention may wander, parents can be grateful that there's some substance as well as fun in this Disney release, for martial arts is presented as a matter of defense rather than aggression, emphasizing that it is a matter of mind and spirit as well as body and requiring resourcefulness and discipline". It spawned three less-successful sequels 3 Ninjas Kick Back, 3 Ninjas Knuckle Up, and 3 Ninjas: High Noon at Mega Mountain.

== Sequel ==
A sequel titled 3 Ninjas Kick Back was released on May 6, 1994.
