= Ed Lauter =

American actor (1938–2013)

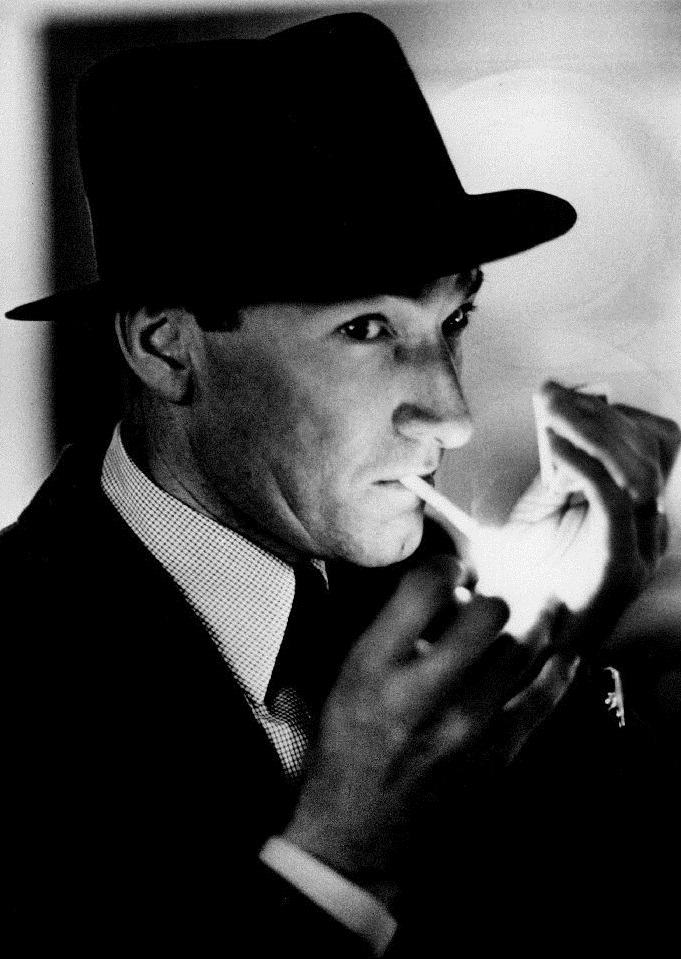
- Lauter in 1975
- Born: Edward Matthew Lauter Jr. October 30, 1938; Long Beach, New York, U.S.
- Died: October 16, 2013 (aged 74); Los Angeles, California, U.S.
- Resting place: Westwood Village Memorial Park
- Education: C.W. Post College (B.A. 1961)
- Occupations: Actor; comedian
- Years active: 1968–2013
- Spouses: Wanda "Future" Fulton (m. 1964; died 1972) Jennifer Holmes (m. 1978; div. 1984) Marnie Melissa Savion (m. 1989; div. 1995) Mia Roberts (m. 2006)
- Children: 4

Edward Matthew Lauter Jr. (/ˈlɔːtər/ LAW-tər; October 30, 1938 – October 16, 2013) was an American actor. He appeared in more than 200 film and television productions in a career that spanned over 40 years, often in character roles as police officers, military men, and other "heavies".

== Early life and education ==
Lauter was born and raised in Long Beach, New York, the son of Edward Matthew Lauter and Sally Lee, a 1920s Broadway actress and dancer. He was of German and Irish descent.

After graduating from high school, he majored in English Literature in college and received a B.A. degree in 1961 from the C.W. Post campus of Long Island University. While in college, he played basketball. Lauter served for two years in the U.S. Army.

== Career ==
Prior to his acting career, Lauter was a stand-up comedian. Lauter's first acting role was a small part in the Broadway production of The Great White Hope in 1968. His screen acting debut was in a 1971 episode of the television series Mannix. His first theatrical film role was in the Western Dirty Little Billy in 1972.

As a character actor, Lauter was known for his 6'2" height and balding looks. He starred with Bruce Dern, Barbara Harris, Karen Black, and William Devane in Alfred Hitchcock's final film, Family Plot. Hitchcock was impressed by Lauter and asked him to play a major role in the romantic espionage thriller he planned as his next film; the director's failing health and eventual death in 1980 meant that The Short Night never went into production.

Lauter appeared in many films, including half a dozen in 1972 alone. Among his most prominent film roles were The Longest Yard (1974), Breakheart Pass (1975), King Kong (1976), Magic (1978), Death Hunt (1981), Timerider (1982), Cujo (1983), Death Wish 3 (1985), My Blue Heaven (1990), The Rocketeer (1991), Seraphim Falls (2006), and The Artist (2011).

Lauter's television appearances included the role as the villain sheriff Martin Stillman in How the West Was Won TV series, and guest-performances on The New Land, Psych, The X-Files (as Mulder's childhood hero, Gemini astronaut Col. Marcus Aurelius Belt in the season 1 episode "Space"), The Streets of San Francisco (on the series debut episode), Kojak, The A-Team, Miami Vice (season 3 episode 6 Shadow in the Dark), Magnum, P.I. (episode Operation Silent Night), Booker, Charmed, Highlander: The Series, Law & Order, Star Trek: The Next Generation (as Lt. Cmdr. Albert in the season 5 episode "The First Duty"), The Equalizer, The Waltons, and ER (with a recurring role as Fire Captain Dannaker).

== Personal life ==
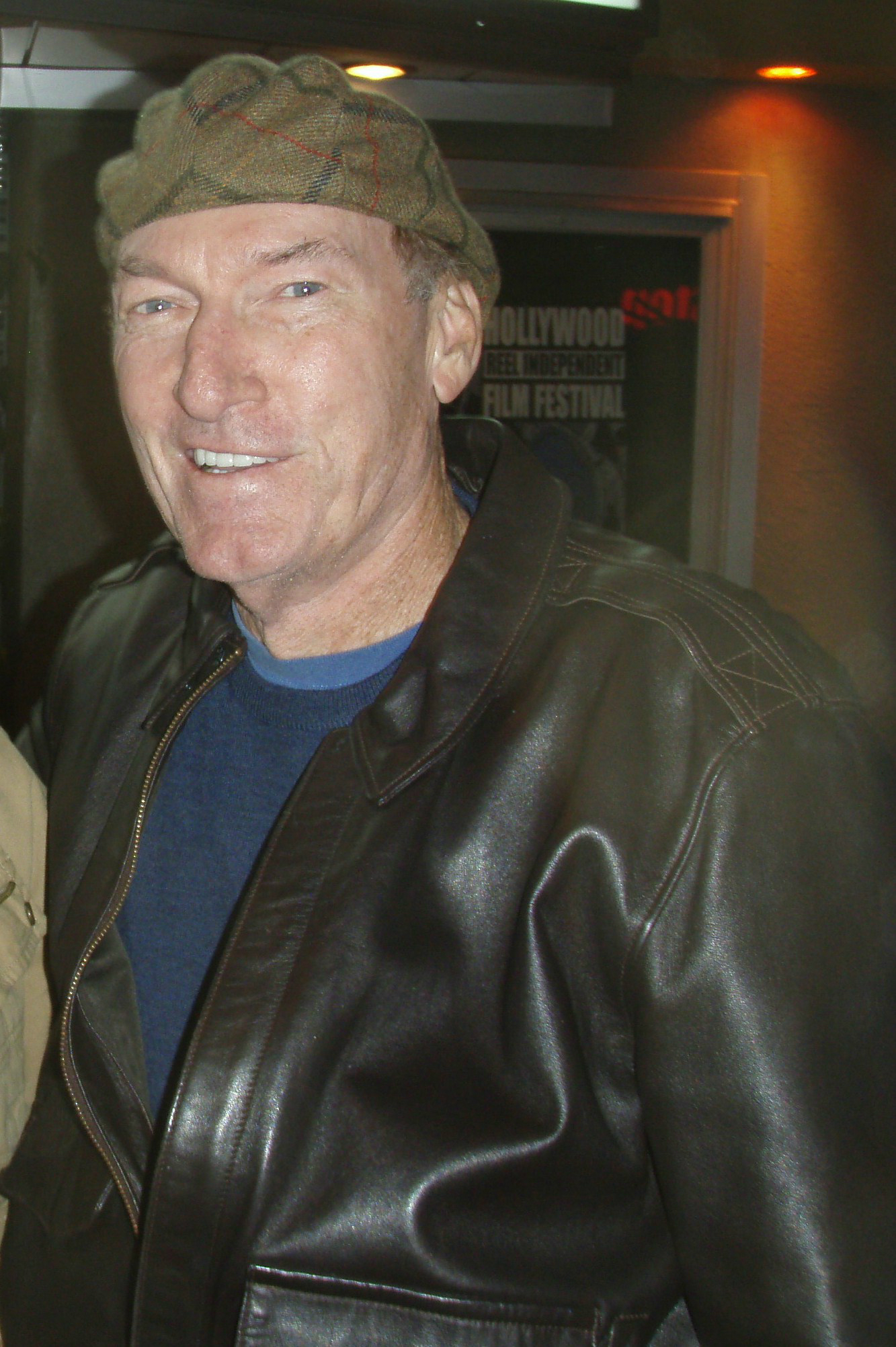
Ed Lauter, 2011

Lauter was married four times; his last wife was Mia Roberts. He had four children from previous marriages.

=== Death ===
On October 16, 2013, Lauter died of mesothelioma, at the age of 74 at his home in West Hollywood.

He had continued to work until a few months before his death, completing roles in several films still to be released after his death.

== Filmography ==
=== Film ===
Year	Title	Role	Notes
1972	The Magnificent Seven Ride!	Scott Elliot	
1972	The New Centurions	Galloway	
1972	Hickey & Boggs	Ted	
1972	Bad Company	Orin	
1972	Dirty Little Billy	Tyler	
1972	Rage	Simpson	
1973	Lolly-Madonna XXX	Hawk Feather	
1973	The Last American Hero	Burton Colt	
1973	Executive Action	Team A Operations Chief	
1974	The Midnight Man	Leroy	
1974	The Longest Yard	Captain Wilhelm Knauer	
1975	Satan's Triangle	Strickland	
1975	French Connection II	General Brian	
1975	Breakheart Pass	Major Claremont	
1976	Family Plot	Joseph Maloney	
1976	King Kong	First Mate Carnahan	
1977	The White Buffalo	Tom Custer	
1977	The Chicken Chronicles	Mr. Nastase	
1978	Loose Shoes	Sheriff Bob	
1978	Magic	Duke	
1981	Death Hunt	Hazel	
1981	The Amateur	Anderson	
1982	Timerider: The Adventure of Lyle Swann	Padre Quinn	
1983	Eureka	Charles Perkins	
1983	Cujo	Joe Camber	
1983	The Big Score	Parks	
1984	Lassiter	"Smoke"	
1984	Finders Keepers	Josef Sirola	
1984	Nickel Mountain	W.D. Freund	
1985	Girls Just Want to Have Fun	Colonel Robert Glenn	
1985	Real Genius	David Decker	
1985	Death Wish 3	Police Chief Richard Shriker	
1986	Youngblood	Murray Chadwick	
1986	Raw Deal	Detective Baker	
1986	3:15	Moran	
1987	Revenge of the Nerds II: Nerds in Paradise	"Buzz"	
1989	Gleaming the Cube	Mr. Kelly	
1989	Tennessee Waltz	Unknown	
1989	Fat Man and Little Boy	Whitney Ashbridge	
1989	Born on the Fourth of July	Legion Commander	
1990	My Blue Heaven	Robert Underwood	
1991	The Rocketeer	FBI Agent Fitch	
1992	Judgement	Dallas Hale	
1992	School Ties	Alan Greene	
1993	Extreme Justice	Captain Shafer	
1993	True Romance	Captain Quiggle	Uncredited
1993	Under Investigation	Captain Maguire	
1994	Wagons East	John Slade	
1994	Trial by Jury	John Boyle	
1995	Leaving Las Vegas	Mobster #3	
1995	Girl in the Cadillac	Ben Wilmer	
1995	Digital Man	General Roberts	
1995	Breach of Trust	Colin Kreuger	
1996	Rattled	Murray Hendershot	
1996	Raven Hawk	Sheriff Daggert	
1996	Mulholland Falls	Detective Earl	
1996	Coyote Summer	Mitchell Foster	
1996	Mercenary	Jack Cochran	
1996	The Sweeper	Donald Molls	
1997	Top of the World	Mel Ridgefield	
1997	Allie & Me	Detective Frank Richards	
1997	Under Wraps	Mr. Kubat	
1999	Out in Fifty	Ed Walker	
1999	Night of Terror	Father Connelly	
2000	Farewell, My Love	Sergei Karpov	
2000	Python	Pilot	
2000	Thirteen Days	General Marshall Carter	
2000	Civility	Detective Erickson	
2001	Knight Club	Fire Marshall	
2001	Not Another Teen Movie	The Coach	
2002	Go for Broke	Warden Lessen	
2003	Gentleman B.	Harry Koslow	
2003	Seabiscuit	Charles Strub	
2003	Nobody Knows Anything	Gun Expert	
2003	The Librarians	John Strong	
2004	Starship Troopers 2: Hero of the Federation	General Jack Gordon Shepherd	
2004	Art Heist	Victor Boyd	
2005	Into the Fire	Captain Dave Cutler	
2005	The Longest Yard	Duane	
2005	Venice Underground	Captain John Sullivan	
2005	Brothers in Arms	Mayor Crawley	
2005	Purple Heart	Civilian	
2006	The Lost	Ed Anderson	
2006	Love Hollywood Style	Lawrence	
2006	Talladega Nights: The Ballad of Ricky Bobby	John Hanafin	Scenes deleted
2006	Seraphim Falls	Parsons	
2007	The Number 23	Father Sebastian	
2007	A Modern Twain Story: The Prince and the Pauper	Pop	
2008	Camille	Sheriff Steiner	
2008	The American Standards	Harry	
2008	Something's Wrong in Kansas	Amos	
2009	Expecting a Miracle	Walter Enright	
2009	Godspeed	Mitch	
2011	The Frankenstein Syndrome	Dr. Walton	
2011	The Artist	Peppy's Butler	
2012	The Fitzgerald Family Christmas	Jim Fitzgerald	
2012	Trouble with the Curve	Max	
2014	The Town That Dreaded Sundown	Sheriff Underwood	Posthumous release
2016	Chief Zabu	Skip Keisel	Final film role, Posthumous release

=== Television ===
Year	Title	Role	Notes
1971	Mannix	Sergeant	Episode: "The Man Outside"
1971–72	Longstreet	Uniformed Officer / Detective	2 episodes
1972	Cannon	Deputy	Episode: "A Flight of Hawks"
1972	Ironside	Newton	Episode: "The Countdown"
1972–73	The Streets of San Francisco	Dr. Joseph Ford	2 episodes
1973	Class of '63	Dave McKay	Television film
1974	The Waltons	Hyder Rudge	Episode: "The Car"
1974	The Migrants	Mr. Barlow	Television film
1974	Kojak	Floyd	Episode: "Mojo"
1974	The New Land	Unknown	Episode: "The Word Is: Growth"
1974	The Godchild	Crees	Television film
1975	Satan's Triangle	Strickland	Television film
1975	Baretta	Ed Borgue	Episode: "Woman in the Harbor"
1975	Last Hours Before Morning	Bud Delaney	Television film
1976	Police Story	Ralph Coleman / Joseph Kinsella	2 episodes
1977	Charlie's Angels	Lieutenant Howard Fine	Episode: "The Blue Angels"
1977	The Rockford Files	Joseph Bloomberg	Episode: "The Dog and Pony Show"
1978	How the West Was Won	Martin Stillman	5 episodes
1978	The Clone Master	Bender	Television film
1978	Greatest Heroes of the Bible	Ularat	2 episodes
1979	The Jericho Mile	Jerry Beloit	Television film
1979	Love's Savage Fury	Sergeant Weed	Television film
1979	Undercover with the KKK	Raleigh Porter	Television film
1979	The Misadventures of Sheriff Lobo	Captain John Sebastian Cain	3 episodes
1979–80	B. J. and the Bear	Captain John Sebastian Cain	5 episodes
1980	Hawaii Five-O	Jonas Halloran	Episode: "The Golden Noose"
1980	The Boy Who Drank Too Much	Gus Carpenter	Television film
1980	Guyana Tragedy: The Story of Jim Jones	Jim Jones Sr.	Miniseries
1980	Alcatraz: The Whole Shocking Story	Frank Morris	Television film
1981	A Nero Wolfe Mystery	Clay Baylor	Episode: "Sweet Revenge"
1982	In the Custody of Strangers	Judge Halloran	Television film
1982	Rooster	Jack Claggert	Television film
1983	Simon & Simon	Colonel Lawrence Grayson	Episode: "What's in a Gnome?"
1983	St. Elsewhere	Stan Morgen	Episode: "Working"
1983	Hardcastle and McCormick	Rick Vetromile	2 episodes
1983	Manimal	Colonel Hunt	Episode: "Manimal"
1983	Magnum, P.I.	Captain Quintin	Episode: "Operation: Silent Night"
1983–84	The A-Team	Major Douglas Kyle, Sheriff Hank Thompson	2 episodes
1984	The Seduction of Gina	Carl	Television film
1984	CBS Schoolbreak Special	Buddy Evans	Episode: "Dead Wrong: The John Evans Story"
1984	The Three Wishes of Billy Grier	Mr. Grier	Television film
1984	Automan	Michael Hagedorn	Episode: "Murder, Take One"
1984	The Yellow Rose	Cal Everett	Episode: "Land of the Free"
1984	Crazy Like a Fox	Emmett Laszlo	Episode: "Pilot"
1984	The Cartier Affair	Lyndon Dean	Television film
1985	Our Family Honor	Ray Wilfong	Episode: "End of the Line"
1986	The Defiant Ones	Sheriff Leroy Doyle	Television film
1986	The Last Days of Patton	Lieutenant Colonel Dr. Paul S. Hill	Television film
1986	Screen Two	Jerry Tyler	Episode: "Double Image"
1986	Miami Vice	Captain Cahill	Episode: "Shadow in the Dark"
1986	The Thanksgiving Promise	Coach Gruniger	Television film 1986 Firefighter B.C. Thompson
1987	Ohara	Vanders	Episode: "Will"
1987	Murder, She Wrote	Sheriff Orville Yates	Episode: "The Cemetery Vote"
1987	The Equalizer	Walter Rowan	Episode: "A Place to Stay"
1988	The Equalizer	Robert Nichols	Episode: "No Place Like Home"
1989	Booker	Kendall	Episode: "High Rise"
1990	Father Dowling Mysteries	Rex Burnham	Episode: "The Confidence Mystery"
1990	Monsters	Malcolm	Episode: "Malcolm"
1990	Kojak: Flowers for Matty	Police Armorer	Television film
1991	Golden Years	General Louis Crewes	Miniseries
1992	Star Trek: The Next Generation	Lieutenant Commander Albert	Episode: "The First Duty"
1992	Calendar Girl, Cop, Killer? The Bambi Bembenek Story	Lieutenant Driscoll	Television film
1993	Renegade	Jack Barnell	Episode: "Partners"
1993	Homicide: Life on the Street	Gruszynski	Episode: "And the Rockets' Dead Glare"
1993	Murder So Sweet	Glen Emory	Television film
1993	The Return of Ironside	Chief Bell	Television film
1993	The X-Files	Lieutenant Colonel Marcus Aurelius Belt	Episode: "Space"
1994	Secret Sins of the Father	Arnold Carter	Television film
1994	Birdland	Captain John Swede	Episode: "Plan B"
1994	Highlander: The Series	Avery Hoskins	Episode: "Bless the Child"
1995	The Tuskegee Airmen	General Stevenson	Television film
1996	Kung Fu: The Legend Continues	Paladin	Episode: "Circle of Light"
1996	Raven Hawk	Sheriff Daggert	Television film
1997	Married to a Stranger	Harry, Megan's Father	Television film
1997	Walker, Texas Ranger	Silas Bedoe	2 episodes
1997	Under Wraps	Kubat	Television film
1998	Millennium	Warden Kellard	Episode: "In Arcadia Ego"
1998	A Bright Shining Lie	General Weyand	Television film
1998	Dollar for the Dead	Jacob Colby	Television film
1998	ER	Fire Captain Dannaker	6 episodes
1999	The Magnificent Seven	Hank Conley	Episode: "Vendetta"
2000	Law & Order	Defense Counsel	Episode: "Entitled"
2001	Charmed	Sutter	Episode: "The Good, the Bad and the Cursed"
2002	CSI: Crime Scene Investigation	Barclay Tobin	Episode: "Cats in the Cradle..."
2004	JAG	General Hughes	Episode: "Whole New Ball Game"
2005	Into the Fire	Captain Dave Cutler	Television film
2005	NYPD Blue	Jerry Rasmussen	Episode: "Old Man Quiver"
2008	Cold Case	Shep "Mack" McAvoy '08	Episode: "One Small Step"
2008	Chocolate News	Jack Cagney	Episode: "#1.5"
2008	Grey's Anatomy	Timothy Miller	Episode: "These Ties That Bind"
2009	Expecting a Miracle	Walter Enright	Television film
2009–10	Psych	Deputy Commissioner Ed Dykstra	2 episodes
2011	Carnal Innocence	Austin Hatinger	Television film
2012–13	Shameless	Dick Healey	4 episodes
2013	The Office	Sam Stone Sr.	Episode "Suit Warehouse"
