= The Sweeper =

1996 film by Joseph Merhi

- Directed by: Joseph Merhi
- Written by: Jacobsen Hart (story); William Applegate Jr. Heather Ferreira (as Karen McCoy)
- Produced by: Joseph Merhi; Richard Pepin; Marta Merrifield (co-producer); Jeff Fahey (associate)
- Starring: C. Thomas Howell; Ed Lauter; Kristen Dalton; Janet Gunn; Jeff Fahey
- Cinematography: Ken Blakey
- Edited by: David Kern; Scott Riddle; Rick Roberts
- Music by: Alex Wilkinson
- Production company: PM Entertainment Group
- Distributed by: PM Entertainment Group
- Release date: June 25, 1996; (U.S.)
- Running time: 90 minutes
- Country: United States
- Language: English

The Sweeper is a 1996 American action film produced and directed by Joseph Merhi, starring C. Thomas Howell, Ed Lauter, Kristen Dalton, Janet Gunn and Jeff Fahey. Howell plays a cop haunted by the early loss of his father (Fahey), whose unhinged behavior makes him a prime recruit for the vigilante unit assembled by a hardline LAPD veteran (Lauter).

== Plot ==
Teenager Mark is the son of police officer Trevor Goddard who, against the objections of his partner, allows his son to accompany him on patrol, as he wants him to one day join him on the force. During an altercation with some criminals loitering on a pier, one of the thugs recognizes the senior Goddard and warns him that word is out on the street that somebody wants him dead. Later at his house, contract killers barge in, looking to murder the entire family. Trevor and his wife are killed, and the leader of death squad hunts Mark down to the bathroom, where he taunts him, handing him a gun and daring him to avenge his parents. However, Mark can't muster the strength to pull the trigger and the gunman shoots him.

Mark is left for dead but survives and is nursed back to health thanks to the support of his grandmother and his crush Melissa. 15 years later, Mark is a grown man, and has indeed enrolled into the police to honor his father's wishes. However, he remains haunted by memories of his parents' violent death and is routinely castigated by his superiors for using excessive force, having been involved in the deaths of nine suspects. As a consequence of his obsession with police work, he is also estranged from Melissa, with whom he has had a son named Danny.

Following his latest misconduct, which saw him beat a child molester after he had already been incapacitated, Mark drinks his problems away at a bar. He is picked up by a female patron who takes him home. There, it is revealed that the seduction was a ploy orchestrated by fellow officer Donald Molls. Molls introduces Goddard to Justice Incorporated, a secret police fellowship which uses extrajudicial methods to fight crime, and sees him as a potential candidate. Mark joins the group, enticed by the prospect of getting his revenge on the criminal underworld that destroyed his family, and by the charms of Molls' right-hand woman and top executioner, Rachel Gill.

== Cast ==
- C. Thomas Howell as Mark Goddard
- Ed Lauter as Donald Molls
- Kristen Dalton as Rachel Gill
- Janet Gunn as Melissa
- Jeff Fahey as Trevor Goddard
- Felton Perry as Foster
- Max Elliott Slade as Young Mark
- Cynda Williams as Diane
- Kathrin Lautner as Amy
- John Saint Ryan as Richman
- Jim O'Malley as Sean
- Jon Ingrassia as Marsh

== Production ==
The film was shot in the Los Angeles metropolitan area during parts of July and August 1995. Although getting second billing, Jeff Fahey only makes a short appearance in the film's prologue as the hero's ill-fated father. He took the job as a favor to producer/director Joe Merhi, to whom he had been introduced by his agent, and with whom he was then in talks to produce an ensemble dramatic comedy written by his friend Robert Downey Sr. (which was eventually made without Fahey or Merhi's involvement as Hugo Pool)

According to cinematographer and PM Entertainment regular Ken Blackey, the film marked yet another step up for the company, which aimed to stay current with the new intensity brought to Hollywood by directors such as John Woo. As such, the featured set pieces—all done without CGI—were more complex, such as the propane-fueled night chase and the climax featuring both a massive truck explosion and a mid-air plane fight. For these sequences, as many as nine different cameras were used. Roughly half would be mounted on or inside vehicles, while the other half would be small Eyemos protected by steel boxes and integrated into the decor to get close-ups of the destruction.

== Release ==
PM Entertainment released The Sweeper domestically on VHS on June 25, 1996.

== Reception ==
The Sweeper received mixed to negative reviews. TV Guide was broadly dismissive, writing: "There is little to distinguish The Sweeper from the other action video product put out by [...] PM Entertainment Group. They generally include a bounty of drawn-out car chases, one gratuitous sex scene, and loads of gunplay. The Sweeper is no exception." The publication was also irked by Howell's "brooding and petulant" hero. Ballantine Books' Video Movie Guide was slightly more amenable, writing that "C. Thomas Howell fares well in this derivative crime-thriller." Entertainment Weekly was moderately positive, writing that although C. Thomas Howell "shrug[ged] through his role", the film boasted "a series of explosions-and-flying-bodies set pieces that are refreshingly old-fashioned given Hollywood’s current love affair with computer F/X."
