= 1995 Stinkers Bad Movie Awards =

Award ceremony presented by the Stinkers Bad Movie Awards in 1995

18th Stinkers Bad Movie Awards
- Date: 1996

Highlights
- Worst Film: Showgirls
- Most awards: Ace Ventura: When Nature Calls (2)
- Most nominations: Ace Ventura: When Nature Calls (5)

The 18th Stinkers Bad Movie Awards were released by the Hastings Bad Cinema Society in 1996 to honour the worst films the film industry had to offer in 1995. When asked about their picks for the five worst movies of the 1990s, founders Mike Lancaster and Ray Wright both selected It's Pat for their lists. Lancaster also included Kids. While It's Pat received three nominations (one of which was a win), Kids got only a mere dishonourable mention for Worst Picture.

Listed below are the different categories, with their respective winners and nominees, including Worst Picture and its dishonourable mentions — films that were considered for Worst Picture but ultimately failed to make the final ballot (30 in total). The most notable change this year is swapping out Worst Resurrection of a TV Show temporarily for Most Painfully Unfunny Comedy. Both categories would appear next year, along with all the other categories listed below. All winners are highlighted.

== Winners and Nominees ==
=== Worst Picture ===
Film	Production company(s)
Showgirls	MGM, United Artists
Ace Ventura: When Nature Calls	Warner Bros.
Casper	Universal Pictures
It's Pat	Touchstone Pictures
Waterworld	Universal Pictures

==== Dishonourable Mentions ====
- Assassins (Warner Bros.)
- Clueless (Paramount)
- Congo (Paramount)
- Cutthroat Island (MGM/UA)
- Destiny Turns on the Radio (Savoy)
- Dr. Jekyll and Ms. Hyde (Savoy)
- Fair Game (Warner Bros.)
- First Knight (Sony)
- Four Rooms (Miramax)
- Jade (Paramount)
- Jerky Boys: The Movie (Touchstone, Caravan)
- Johnny Mnemonic (Sony)
- Judge Dredd (Hollywood)
- Jury Duty (Sony)
- Kids (Shining Excalibur)
- Mallrats (Gramercy)
- Man of the House (Disney)
- Mortal Kombat (New Line)
- Operation Dumbo Drop (Disney)
- Safe (Sony)
- The Scarlet Letter (Hollywood)
- Something to Talk About (Warner Bros.)
- Species (MGM)
- Stuart Saves His Family (Paramount)
- Tank Girl (United Artists)
- To Wong Foo, Thanks For Everything, Julie Newmar (Universal)
- Tommy Boy (Paramount)
- Under Siege 2: Dark Territory (Warner Bros.)
- Vampire in Brooklyn (Paramount)
- Village of the Damned (Universal)

=== Other Categories ===
Worst Actor: Sylvester Stallone for Assassins and Judge Dredd; Jim Carrey for Ace Ventura: When Nature Calls; Chevy Chase for Man of the House; Kevin Costner for Waterworld; Kyle MacLachlan for Showgirls	Worst Actress: Julia Sweeney for It's Pat; Elizabeth Berkley for Showgirls; Cindy Crawford for Fair Game; Natasha Henstridge for Species; Demi Moore for The Scarlet Letter
Most Painfully Unfunny Comedy: Ace Ventura: When Nature Calls (Warner Bros.); Dr. Jekyll and Ms. Hyde (Savoy); It's Pat (Touchstone); Jury Duty (Sony); Stuart Saves His Family (Paramount)	Worst Sequel: Ace Ventura: When Nature Calls (Warner Bros.); Batman Forever (Warner Bros.); Free Willy 2: The Adventure Home (Warner Bros.); Halloween 6: The Curse of Michael Myers (Dimension); 3 Ninjas Knuckle Up (Sony)
The Sequel Nobody Was Clamoring For: Halloween: The Curse of Michael Myers (Dimension); Ace Ventura: When Nature Calls (Warner Bros.); Free Willy 2: The Adventure Home (Warner Bros.); Grumpier Old Men (Warner Bros.); 3 Ninjas Knuckle Up (Sony)	The Founders Award – What Were They Thinking and Why?: Johnny Mnemonic (Sony)
