= The Frankenstein Syndrome =

- Film poster
- Directed by: Sean Tretta
- Written by: Sean Tretta
- Based on: Frankenstein by Mary Shelley
- Produced by: Dustin Lowry; Tiffany Shepis; Noah Todd; Sean Tretta
- Starring: Ed Lauter; Louis Mandylor; Tiffany Shepis; Scott Anthony Leet
- Cinematography: Eve Cohen
- Edited by: Eric Weston; Sean Tretta
- Music by: Lawrence Shragge
- Release dates: April 10, 2010 (Phoenix Film Festival); July 5, 2011
- Running time: 90 minutes
- Country: United States
- Language: English

The Frankenstein Syndrome (originally titled The Prometheus Project) is a 2010 American science fiction-horror film written and directed by Sean Tretta. Scott Anthony Leet stars as a murdered security guard who is reanimated by a research institute in the tradition of Mary Shelley's novel Frankenstein. It showed in film festivals in 2010 and then was released directly to DVD.

== Plot ==
Researchers are conducting secret and illegal experiments with stem cells. They accidentally discover a serum derived from these stem cells that is capable of reviving dead cellular tissue. When a security guard named David Doyle threatens to sue the research company and wishes to leave the project, he is promptly murdered and used as a test subject.

David returns to life but, in the style of The Reanimator, David is not the same man he once was. Not only are his personality and memory changed, but he is seen to have acquired psychic and telekinetic powers, as well as increased strength and aggression. David begins to act out against the researchers, who all at once are his captors, murderers, and creators.

== Cast ==
- Ed Lauter as Dr. Walton
- Louis Mandylor as Marcus
- Tiffany Shepis as Elizabeth Barnes
- Scott Anthony Leet as David Doyle
- Maya Stojan as Dr. Walton's Nurse

== Production ==
Dread Central reported that it was in post-production in March 2010.

== Release ==
American World Pictures purchased the film in October 2010 and retitled it to The Frankenstein Syndrome. MTI Home Video released it on July 5, 2011.

== Reception ==
Darryl Loomis of DVD Verdict wrote, "The Frankenstein Syndrome isn't a great film, but for those into both Mary Shelley's beautiful novel and independent horror, you can do a whole lot worse than this." Bill Gibron of PopMatters rated it 7/10 stars and wrote, "While some of the subplots and a few of the asides don't add up to much and the payoff promises something the movie might not be willing to breach, this is still a bold, audacious statement."
