= 3 Ninjas Knuckle Up =

- Theatrical release poster
- Directed by: Shin Sang-ok
- Written by: Alex S. Kim
- Produced by: Martha Chang; James Kang
- Starring: Victor Wong; Charles Napier; Michael Treanor; Max Elliott Slade; Chad Power; Vincent Schiavelli
- Cinematography: Eugene Shluglet
- Edited by: Pam Choules
- Music by: Gary Stevan Scott
- Production company: Sheen Productions
- Distributed by: TriStar Pictures
- Release date: March 10, 1995
- Running time: 88 minutes
- Country: United States
- Language: English
- Box office: $407,618 (U.S.) (sub-total)

3 Ninjas Knuckle Up is a 1995 American martial arts comedy film and a sequel to 3 Ninjas and 3 Ninjas Kick Back. The film was directed by Shin Sang-ok, using the pseudonym "Simon Sheen". The film was shot in 1992, the same year the first film was released, but was not released in the United States until 1995.

== Plot ==
14-year-old Rocky, 13-year-old Colt, and 8-year-old Tum Tum defend "Truth, Justice and the American Way", once more - this time, protecting a Native American village and the rest of society against a company that causes toxic waste.

During a summer, the boys are staying with Grandpa Mori when they witness the Native Americans protesting against the waste industry and the fight soon breaks out while Mori and the boys are ordered to drive away by the authorities. The next day, the boys encounter the same group of men led by J.J. harassing a girl named Jo from the protest, at the pizza parlor, after she demands they tell her about her father's whereabouts. After Jo is thrown to the floor in front of the horrified customers, Colt helps her up before he, Tum-Tum and Rocky step in to protect her by fighting the men with their martial arts techniques and are cheered on by the admiring Jo and the amazed customers. After fending off the men, they are praised by the customers and other kids as heroes, which gives them big heads. However, the boys are put to work by Mori and the owner of the pizza parlor to work off damages from their fight. Mori tries to teach them a lesson in humility, but the reference of a flower blooming goes over their heads. Jo comes to the boys later at the pizza parlor and explains that the men are under the employ of Jack Harding, an industrialist who is illegally dumping toxic contents into the Native American reserve. Without proof, they can do nothing. Jo's father Charlie had gone to investigate, but he has not returned. Colt, who is seemingly attracted to Jo, agrees that they will help and find her father. The boys follows the men to sneak into Jack's waste management and overheard his conversation with the Mayor about corruption and find Charlie imprisoned. The boys manage to fight off the some of Jack's men and escape, which they report to Jo. That night, they mount an escape plan for her father, which is successful after they fight them and escape through the sewer with Colt and Rocky dodges Jack's men that sets up a trap with fires. They spend the night celebrating with the tribe and getting thanks for helping them. During the dance, Jack and his men attack them once again until the boys and Native Americans fight them off with the help of Mori, who is suspicious about his grandsons' activities.

Charlie and his family prepares and appeals for a court date with significant evidence to put Jack out of business. Soon, Jack arranges to have Jo kidnapped by the Bikers and convince her father to falsify his evidence, which he has no other choice for her safety.

The Douglas boys get the information to find where Jo is being held hostage, drive out to rescue her and return before the court case is dismissed and all of Charlie's hard work accounts for nothing at all. After fighting through a small band of armed bikers at the abandoned town, they find Jo and return her to the court house. The boys arrive and fight off Jack's men and the corrupt deputies as Jo arrives to the courtroom just before her father is about to turn the real evidence over to Jack. Charlie punches Jack, admits his mistake and hands the real evidence to the EPA representative who resolves the case and finally shuts down the company producing the landfill.

As the boys leave the court, Jo and her family look around for the 'heroes' of the day, but they are nowhere to be found. Returning to Mori's home, Rocky, Colt and Tum-Tum realize the point of Mori's earlier lesson: that a flower is content to bloom quietly, without clamoring for attention. Grandpa Mori and the boys somersault into the air in victory.

== Cast ==
- Victor Wong as Mori Tanaka, maternal grandfather and mentor to Rocky, Colt and Tum Tum.
- Charles Napier as Jack Harding, a wealthy but evil manager of a waste disposal company.
- Michael Treanor as Samuel 'Rocky' Douglas Jr, the oldest of the three brothers.
- Max Elliott Slade as Jeffrey 'Colt' Douglas, the middle child of the three brothers.
- Chad Power as Michael 'Tum-Tum' Douglas, the youngest of the three brothers.
- Crystle Lightning as Jo, a young Native American girl and friend of the three ninjas.
- Patrick Kilpatrick as J.J., Jack's right-hand man.
- Vincent Schiavelli as The Mayor
- Donald L. Shanks as Charlie, Jo’s father.
- Sheldon Peters Wolfchild as Lee
- Nickolas G. Ramus as Chief Roundcreek
- Donal Logue as Jimmy
- Scott MacDonald as Eddy
- Selina Jayne as Jo's Mother
- Don Stark as The Sheriff
- Dennis Holahan as Dean Thompson

== Production ==
Production began on 3 Ninjas Knuckle Up on June 29, 1993. The film was actually shot right after the original 3 Ninjas, 80% of the film was completed but production was haulted due to distribution complications, causing the film to be shelved for two years. 1994 production started again and final key shots were filmed. Proof is shown of this throughout the film and some of the main characters looked drastically older in some scenes. As shown when 3 Ninjas character Rocky has appearing and disappearing braces on his teeth.

== Release ==
3 Ninjas Knuckle Up was theatrically released on March 10, 1995, followed by a home video release on July 25, 1995. Despite being filmed prior to 3 Ninjas Kick Back, the film ultimately ended up coming out after Kick Back as the third entry in the series.

== Reception ==
=== Critical response ===
The film received mostly negative reviews.

On Metacritic, 3 Ninjas Knuckle Up holds 39 out of a 100 based on 6 critics, indicating "generally unfavorable" reviews.

=== Accolades ===
The film was nominated for Worst Sequel and The Sequel Nobody Was Clamoring For at the 1995 Stinkers Bad Movie Awards, but lost to Ace Ventura: When Nature Calls and Halloween: The Curse of Michael Myers, respectively.

Despite negativity, Michael Sauter of Entertainment Weekly gave the film a "B−" grade.

== Sequel ==
A fourth sequel titled 3 Ninjas: High Noon at Mega Mountain was released on April 10, 1998.
