= 3 Ninjas: High Noon at Mega Mountain =

- Theatrical release poster
- Directed by: Sean McNamara
- Written by: Sean McNamara; Jeff Phillips
- Produced by: Arthur Leeds; Shin Sang-ok
- Starring: Hulk Hogan; Loni Anderson; Victor Wong; Mathew Botuchis; Michael J. O'Laskey II; James Paul Roeske ll; Jim Varney
- Cinematography: Blake T. Evans
- Edited by: Annamaria Szanto
- Music by: John Coda
- Production companies: TriStar Pictures; Sheen Productions
- Distributed by: Sony Pictures Releasing
- Release date: April 10, 1998
- Running time: 93 minutes
- Country: United States
- Language: English
- Box office: $ 375,805 (U.S.)

3 Ninjas: High Noon at Mega Mountain is a 1998 American martial arts film. It is the fourth and final installment in the 3 Ninjas franchise.

The film is directed by Sean McNamara. None of the original child actors from the previous films, such as Michael Treanor, Max Elliott Slade and Chad Power, returned for this installment because they had gotten older. Victor Wong is the only cast member to appear in all four films. It is also his final film before his death in 2001. It was filmed in Denver, Colorado at Elitch Gardens Theme Park.

== Plot ==
During their summer vacation with their grandfather Mori, 15-year-old Rocky, 14-year-old Colt, and 9-year-old Tum-Tum undertake a test on a pitch-black obstacle course. Although they complete the course, they fail to master using their other senses to compensate for lack of sight. That night, Mori overhears Rocky and Colt planning not to return the following year due to growing older, which leaves Tum-Tum feeling alone. Mori becomes deeply saddened by this.

Back home, Tum-Tum becomes depressed upon learning his favorite TV show, Dave Dragon & the Star Force 5, is being canceled. The next day, the siblings meet their new neighbor Amanda when she accidentally collides her remote-controlled helicopter into their window breaking it. To make amends, Jessica invites Amanda for breakfast and later to Tum-Tum’s birthday party at Mega Mountain, an amusement park modeled after Six Flags.

At Mega Mountain, Rocky spends time with his girlfriend Jennifer and her friends Veronica, Eric, and Doyle, while Tum-Tum persuades Colt and Amanda to watch a show with him. Amid the fun, master criminal Mary Ann "Medusa" Rogers and her henchmen stealthily seize control of the park, disabling rides, holding guests hostage, and converting the command center into their base. Medusa demands a $10 million ransom from park owner Harry Jacobson for the patrons’ safety.

Tum-Tum and Colt attempt to get an autograph from Dave Dragon but instead witness him being captured by the assailants. Rocky rejoins his brothers and Amanda after spotting his bros being chased by the assailants on the park’s surveillance monitors. Together, they wake up and inform Dave about the takeover, and he goes off alone to confront the mercenaries. The group retrieves a radio dropped by the assailants to contact emergency services, prompting police and fire units to respond. Medusa’s men ambush the police, forcing the FBI to intervene.

In retaliation, Medusa orders her sidekick C.J. to accelerate the Avalanche ride dangerously. Using Amanda’s laptop skills and their ninja abilities, the kids rescue trapped riders, fight off Medusa’s henchmen and override the ride controls. To stop the children’s interference, Medusa dispatches her bumbling nephews Carl, Buelow, and Zed—to capture them, but they are defeated by the brothers using carnival game props and park rides.

Meanwhile, Dave sneaks into the command center but is captured. The SWAT team attempts to storm the park but is thwarted by electrical traps set by Medusa’s mercenaries. Amanda hacks into the park’s systems to lock down rides while fending off C.J.’s attempts to regain control. Medusa activates the Zinger roller coaster’s emergency brake, stopping it mid-inversion. Dave attacks Medusa but is subdued and imprisoned with the other hostages at the coaster’s base.

Spotting Rocky and Jennifer on ride monitors, Medusa’s nephews capture and tie Jennifer under the Zinger loop. Rocky ventures alone to rescue her but is confronted by Medusa’s second-in-command, Lothar Zogg. After an altercation atop the roller coaster loop, Rocky uses a yo-yo to trip Lothar, sending him crashing into authorities outside. Rocky frees Jennifer just as Medusa releases the coaster to crush them.

Park owner Jacobson arrives by helicopter with ransom money, but Amanda shreds the last bag with her remote helicopter, scattering cash over the park. Medusa captures Amanda and escapes underground with remaining funds. Dave fights Medusa’s ninjas but is knocked unconscious. The boys battle remaining henchmen until Medusa shoots the lights in the underground into darkness, instructing her ninjas in using night vision goggles to gain advantage.

Recalling Mori’s advice to rely on their other senses, the boys overcome the darkness and defeat Medusa’s ninjas, rescuing Amanda, who is handcuffed next to a bomb. Unable to disarm it due to power failure, they attach the bomb taped to oxygen tanks and send it as a makeshift torpedo, with the help of Dave’s strength, toward Medusa’s escaping ship. The bomb detonates on impact, destroying the ship.

Police arrive and apprehend Medusa, who accepts defeat. Celebrated as heroes, the boys reunite with their family but credit Dave Dragon as the true hero. The media announces plans to revive Dave’s show in honor of his bravery. Rocky and Colt decide to continue their training and invite Amanda to join them next year, which she happily accepts. The film and the series ends with a joyous celebration of Tum-Tum’s birthday.

== Cast ==
- Hulk Hogan as Dave Dragon
- Loni Anderson as Mary Ann "Medusa" Rogers, a leader of her terrorist group
- Victor Wong as Grandpa Mori Tanaka, Rocky, Colt & Tum-Tum's maternal grandfather
- Mathew Botuchis as Samuel "Rocky" Douglas Jr., Colt & Tum-Tum's older brother
- Michael O'Laskey II as Jeffrey "Colt" Douglas, Rocky & Tum-Tum's middle brother
- J.P. Roeske II as Michael "Tum-Tum" Douglas, Rocky & Colt's younger brother
- Alan McRae as FBI Agent Sam Douglas, Rocky, Colt & Tum-Tum's father
- Margarita Franco as Jessica Douglas, Rocky, Colt & Tum-Tum's mother
- Jim Varney as Lothar Zogg, Medusa's right-hand man
- Lindsay Felton as Jennifer
- Chelsey Earlywine as Amanda
- Kirk Baily as Carl, one of Medusa's dimwitted nephews
- Travis McKenna as Buelow, one of Medusa's dimwitted nephews
- Brendan O'Brien as Zed, one of Medusa's dimwitted nephews
- Emily Roeske as Little Girl
- Dwayne Carrington as C.J., Medusa's Jamaican sidekick
- Pat Mahoney as Harry Jacobson

== Production ==
Filming began in 1996. Hulk Hogan, wrestling in World Championship Wrestling (WCW) at the time, wore a wig for the film, which resulted in him having a different hairstyle than his traditional bald look. As a result, he is seen in Halloween Havoc ’96 with a similar hairstyle as he had in the film. Elitch Gardens Theme Park, the park at which it was filmed, underwent a complete remodel, with all the signs for the park and rides being changed and renamed for the film. However, there are a few times when the real ones are seen in the background.

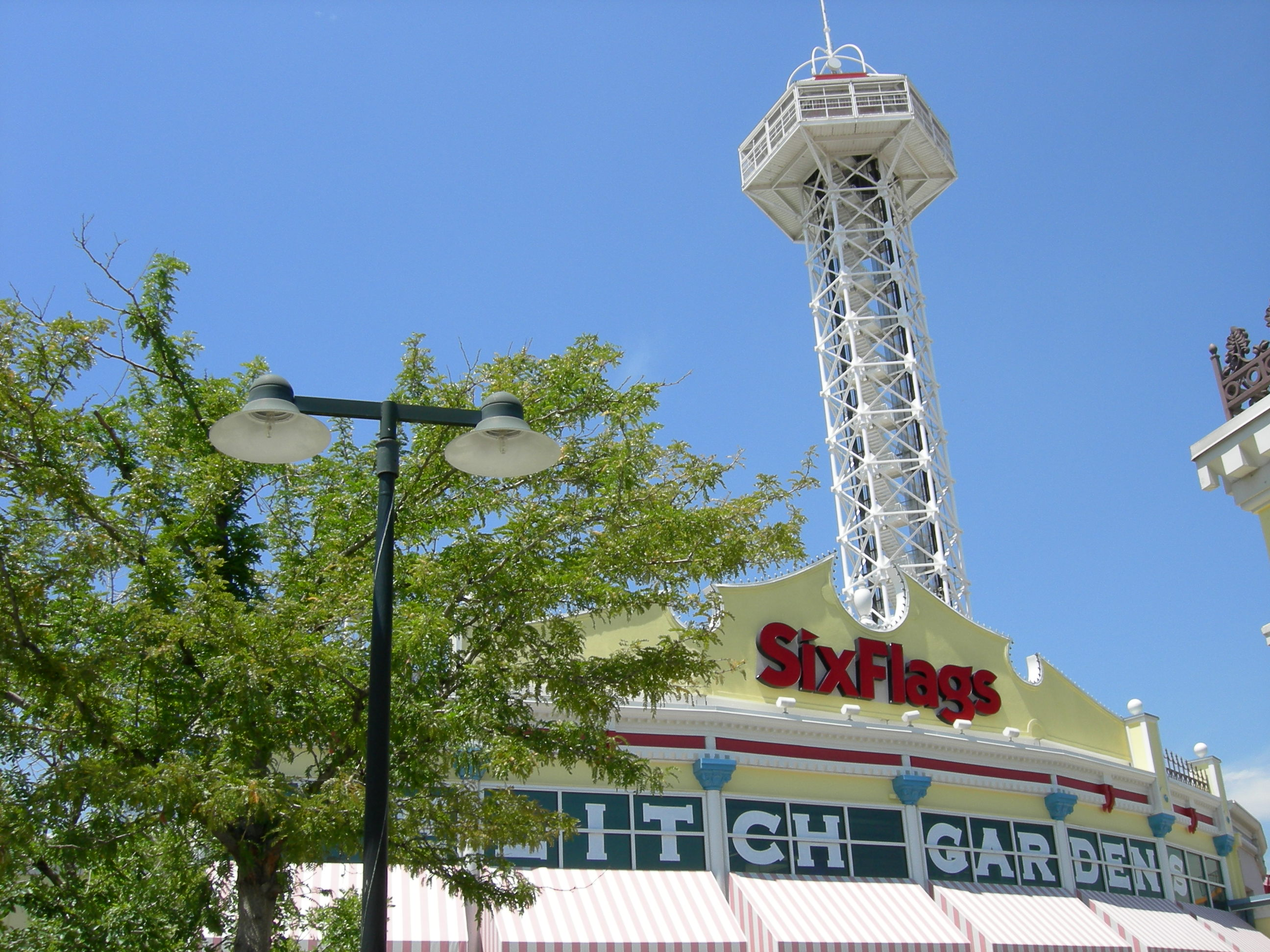
Elitch Gardens Theme Park the park that was filmed during the movie.

== Release ==
3 Ninjas: High Noon at Mega Mountain was theatrically released on April 10, 1998 followed by a home video release on September 1, 1998.

== Reception ==
=== Critical response ===
The film had universally negative reviews and is generally considered to be the worst of the four in the series. On the review aggregator website Rotten Tomatoes, 0% of 7 critics' reviews are positive, with an average rating of 2.6/10. Metacritic, which uses a weighted average, assigned the film a score of 44 out of 100, based on 7 critics, indicating "mixed or average" reviews.

Joe Leydon of Variety wrote: "Only small children with limited attention spans will be impressed by the lackluster kung-foolishness". Anita Gates of The New York Times says "things are sad when Hulk Hogan gives the most touching performance in the film". Gates calls the film "interminably boring" but concedes it is possible young children might enjoy it.

=== Legacy ===
The film was later released in a trilogy set along with the second and third films in the franchise, and has since seen a nostalgic revival. Simon of "The Mighty 90s" called it "the most 90s movie you can watch", also stating it had the most complex and impressive fight scenes of the franchise.
