= Victor Wong (actor, born 1927) =

American actor and journalist (1927-2001)

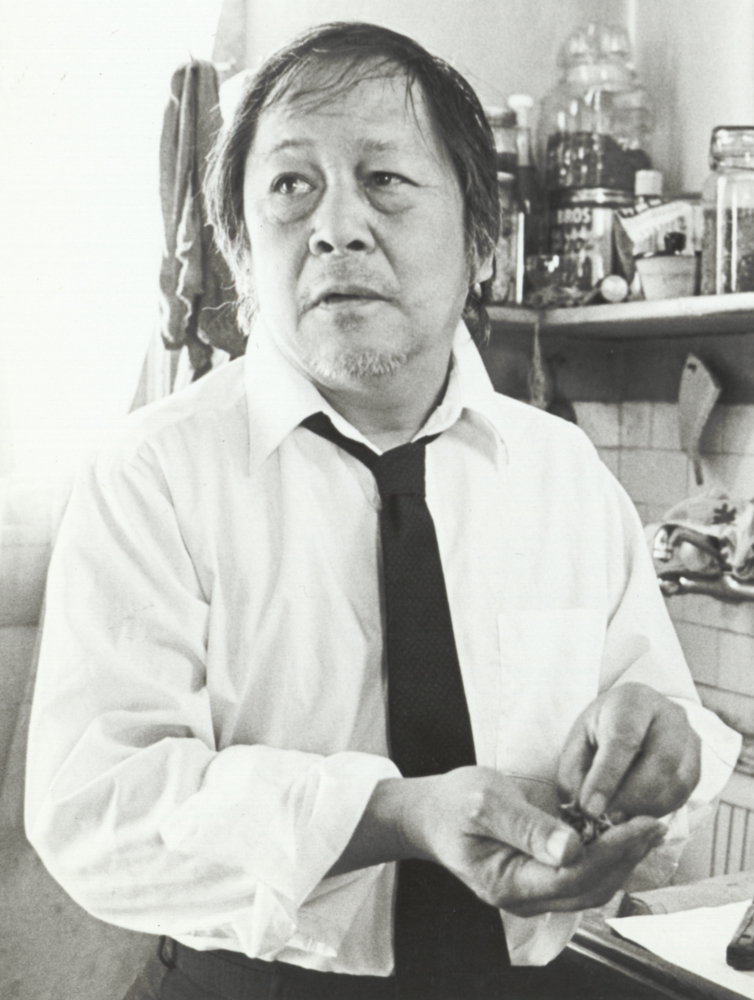
- Wong in 1983
- Born: Victor Gee Keung Wong; July 30, 1927; San Francisco, California, U.S.
- Died: September 12, 2001 (aged 74); Locke, California, U.S.
- Education: UC Berkeley; University of Chicago; San Francisco Art Institute
- Occupations: Actor; Journalist; Artist
- Years active: 1968–1998
- Spouses: Olive Thurman; Robin Goodfellow; Carol Freeland; Dawn Rose (m. 19??; his death)
- Children: 5, including Lyon Wong

Chinese name
- Traditional Chinese: 黃自強
- Simplified Chinese: 黄自強
Transcriptions
Standard Mandarin
- Hanyu Pinyin: Huáng Zìqiáng
Yue: Cantonese
- Jyutping: Wong4 Zi6koeng4

Victor Gee Keung Wong (July 30, 1927 – September 12, 2001) was an American actor, artist, and journalist.

He appeared in supporting roles in films throughout the 1980s and 1990s, including Chinese sorcerer Egg Shen in John Carpenter's cult film Big Trouble in Little China, royal adviser Chen Bao Shen in the Best Picture–winning The Last Emperor (1987), rural storekeeper Walter Chang in the comedy horror film Tremors (1990), and Grandpa Mori in the 3 Ninjas tetralogy (1992–1998). He also played several starring roles for independent filmmaker Wayne Wang, who described him as his "alter ego".

Earlier in his career, Wong worked for KQED as an on-air reporter and later a pioneering photojournalist. His association with Mark Rothko, whom he met during his studies at the San Francisco Art Institute, saw him interact with several luminaries of the Beat Generation, including Jack Kerouac, who fictionalized him as "Arthur Ma" in his novel Big Sur.

== Early life and education ==
Wong was born in San Francisco to Chinese parents and lived in Chinatown near the Stockton Street Tunnel. His father, Sare King Wong, was born and raised in Guangdong province, and later moved to Shanghai as a news journalist. His mother Alice was a devout Christian who took the family to the First Chinese Baptist Church every week. Wong was one of five children; his siblings were Sarah Wong Lum, Zeppelin Wong, and twins Shirley Wong Frentzel and Betty Wong Brown. Sare King Wong's grandfather had founded the Young China newspaper with Dr. Sun Yat-sen. Victor Wong was fluent with both English and Cantonese, which helped lead his acting career to Hong Kong.

Wong and his family moved to Courtland, California when he was two years old after his father took a job as teacher and principal at a school for the children of local Chinese laborers. The family would move back to Chinatown within three years and his father was active in local politics. He would live in Sacramento, California for much of his adult life.

Wong studied political science and journalism at the University of California, Berkeley and theology at the University of Chicago under Paul Tillich, Reinhold Niebuhr and Martin Buber. In Chicago, Wong joined The Second City comedy troupe and stayed with Langston Hughes. Wong returned to San Francisco for the summer, taking part in a theatre production and never returning to Chicago; he resumed his studies at the San Francisco Art Institute under Mark Rothko, earning a master's degree in 1962.

== Journalism ==
Although he had acted in and staged productions with his first wife, Olive, who he had met after his return from Chicago, Wong was inspired by the assassination of John F. Kennedy to pursue a career in journalism, landing an on-air role for KQED's Newsroom, where he won a Regional Emmy, from 1968 until 1974, when he was stricken with Bell's palsy.

During his tenure on Newsroom, Wong is credited with inventing the photojournalistic essay, covering stories with his still camera and returning to narrate them in the studio. The palsy would give him his later distinctive appearance, but at the time, he felt his roles had diminished because he wasn't "pretty looking".

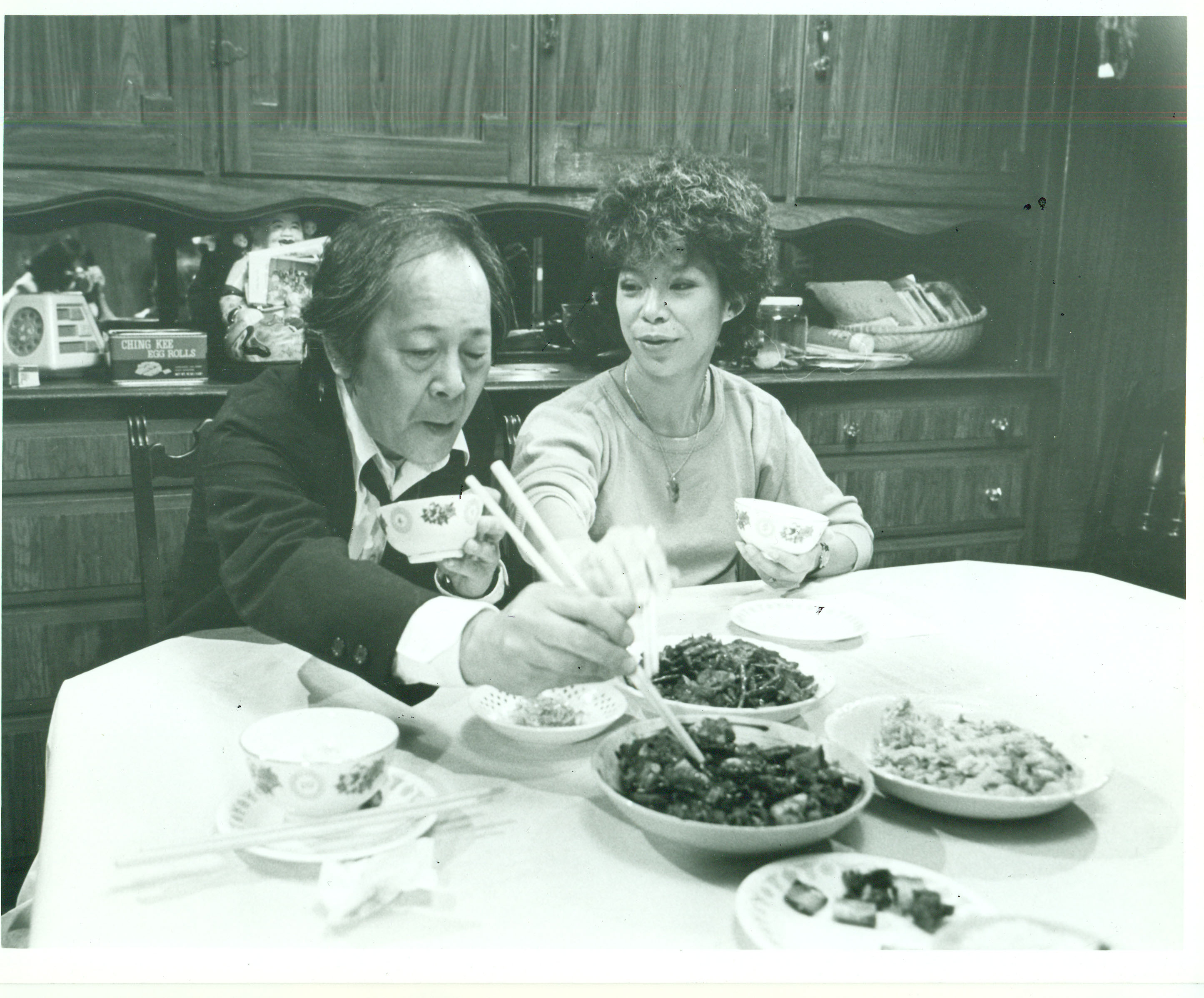
Wong with Laureen Chew in Dim Sum: A Little Bit of Heart.

== Acting career ==
After his news career ended, Wong turned to acting, starting in the local Asian American theatre and later landing larger roles on the stages of New York City. In October 1980, Wong made his Asian American Theater Company (AATC) debut in San Francisco by appearing in their production of Paper Angels by Genny Lim. He was on Social Security Disability Insurance at the time due to his palsy. In New York, he acted in the plays Family Devotions and Sound and Beauty, written by David Henry Hwang.

His stage work led to television work and eventually, into movies; his film debut was in 1984's Dim Sum: A Little Bit of Heart, directed by Wayne Wang. In between film roles, Wong lived in Sacramento, California, where he supported the local performing arts. In 1986 he was the Old Man in the movie hit The Golden Child alongside Eddie Murphy. In 1992, he acted in the Hong Kong film, Cageman (笼民). He later starred as Grandpa Mori in the 3 Ninjas franchise, and the cult-classics, Big Trouble in Little China and Tremors.

He worked closely with director Wayne Wang. The independent filmmaker and fellow San Franciscan first cast him in the lead role of his 1985 film Dim Sum: A Little Bit of Heart, and went on to include him in Eat a Bowl of Tea and Life Is Cheap... But Toilet Paper Is Expensive (both 1989), and The Joy Luck Club (1993). Wang later called Wong his role model for living life.

I felt that Victor was my alter ego for a few years ... Victor was very experimental and had this innocent child-like quality that is a part of me. I felt very close to him.

— Wayne Wang, quoted in Asian Week, 2001

He retired from acting in 1998 after suffering two strokes. Wong returned to art, and held a solo exhibition at the B. Sakata Garo gallery in Sacramento.

== Association with the Beat Generation ==
In the 1950s, while studying art under Mark Rothko, Victor Wong had his first art exhibition at the City Lights Bookstore. During this time, Wong befriended Lawrence Ferlinghetti. He illustrated Oranges, Dick McBride's first collection of poetry, which was handset and printed at the Bread and Wine Mission in 1960. He met Jack Kerouac in the early 1960s, who chronicled their meeting in his novel Big Sur (1962). In the novel, Wong is characterised as "Arthur Ma".

== Personal life ==
Wong was married four times: to Olive Thurman Wong (daughter of civil rights activist Howard Thurman), Carol Freeland, Robin Goodfellow, and Dawn Rose. He had two daughters, Emily and Heather, and three sons, Anton, Lyon, and Duncan. His children Emily and Anton were from his first marriage to Olive Thurman.

His son, musician Lyon Wong, died in 1986 after being attacked by a young man while walking home in Sacramento. Wong was asked to film the prologue scene for Big Trouble in Little China shortly after Lyon's wake; after shooting the scene, Wong suffered his first stroke. At approximately the same time, Wong met and befriended Dawn Rose, who was an artist in Locke; they married in 1998 and together they purchased a former restaurant and store completed in 1913 in Walnut Grove, planning to open an art gallery and teahouse there in 2001.

== Death ==
On September 11, 2001, Wong and his wife Dawn Rose spent the day trying to get news of their sons who were in New York City during the September 11 attacks (who were found to be unharmed). After Rose went to sleep, Wong stayed up to continue following the news of the September 11 attacks. He died of a heart attack at some point during the early hours of September 12, 2001. He was 74.

== Filmography ==
=== Film ===
| Year | Title | Role | Director | Notes |
|---|---|---|---|---|
| 1982 | Nightsongs | Fung Leung | Marva Nabili | |
| 1985 | Dim Sum: A Little Bit of Heart | Uncle Tam | Wayne Wang | |
| 1985 | Year of the Dragon | Harry Yung | Michael Cimino | |
| 1986 | Big Trouble in Little China | Egg Shen | John Carpenter | |
| 1986 | Shanghai Surprise | Ho Chong | Jim Goddard | |
| 1986 | The Golden Child | The Old Man | Michael Ritchie | |
| 1987 | The Last Emperor | Chen Pao Shen | Bernardo Bertolucci | |
| 1987 | Prince of Darkness | Howard Birack | John Carpenter | |
| 1989 | Eat a Bowl of Tea | Wah Gay | Wayne Wang | |
| 1989 | Life Is Cheap... But Toilet Paper Is Expensive | Blind Man | Wayne Wang | |
| 1989 | Fatal Vacation | Grandpa | Eric Tsang | |
| 1990 | Solo | Frank | Susan Inouye | Short film |
| 1990 | Tremors | Walter Chang | Ron Underwood | |
| 1991 | Mystery Date | Janitor | Jonathan Wacks | |
| 1992 | 3 Ninjas | Grandpa Mori | Jon Turteltaub | |
| 1992 | Cageman | Sissy | Jacob Cheung | |
| 1993 | The Ice Runner | Fyodor | Barry Samson | |
| 1993 | The Joy Luck Club | Old Chong | Wayne Wang | |
| 1994 | 3 Ninjas Kick Back | Grandpa Mori | Charles T. Kanganis | |
| 1994 | Ching hat yi! | Johnny | Tang Wing-Yiu | |
| 1995 | 3 Ninjas Knuckle Up | Grandpa Mori | Shin Sang-ok | |
| 1995 | The Stars Fell on Henrietta | Henry Nakai | James Keach | |
| 1995 | Da mao xian jia | Uncle Nine | Ringo Lam | |
| 1995 | Jade | Mr. Wong | William Friedkin | |
| 1996 | The Devil Takes a Holiday | Chi Chi | Leon Corcos | |
| 1996 | Paper Dragons | Master Chang | Adolfo Swaya | |
| 1997 | Seven Years in Tibet | Amban | Jean-Jacques Annaud | |
| 1997 | My America ... or Honk if You Love Buddha | Himself | Renee Tajima-Peña | Documentary |
| 1998 | 3 Ninjas: High Noon at Mega Mountain | Grandpa Mori | Sean McNamara | |

=== Television ===
| Year | Title | Role | Notes |
|---|---|---|---|
| 1975–1976 | Search for Tomorrow | Chang | |
| 1984–1985 | American Playhouse | Fung Leung / Chin Gung | Episodes: "Nightsongs" & "Paper Angels" |
| 1988 | Beauty and the Beast | Dr. Wong | Episode: "China Moon" |
| 1989 | A Fine Romance | Lon Mo Wah | Episode: "The Tomas Crown Affair" |
| 1990 | Forbidden Nights | Ho | TV movie |
| 1990 | Legacy | Larry Chow | TV movie |
| 1990 | Midnight Caller | Phil Wong | Episode: "Language Barrier" |
| 1994 | Due South | Coo | Episode: "Chinatown" |
| 1996 | Poltergeist: The Legacy | Lee Tzin-Soong | Episode: "Fox Spirit" |
