= 3 Ninjas Kick Back =

American film directed by Charles T. Kanganis

- Theatrical release poster
- Directed by: Charles T. Kanganis
- Written by: Sang-ok Shin; Mark Saltzman
- Produced by: Martha Chang; James Kang; Arthur Leeds
- Starring: Victor Wong; Max Elliott Slade; Sean Fox; Evan Bonifant; Dustin Nguyen; Sab Shimono
- Cinematography: Christopher Faloona
- Edited by: Jeffrey Reiner; David Rennie
- Music by: Richard Marvin
- Production companies: Sheen Productions; Leeds/Ben-Ami Productions, Inc.
- Distributed by: TriStar Pictures
- Release date: May 6, 1994
- Running time: 93 minutes
- Country: United States
- Language: English
- Budget: $20 million
- Box office: $11,798,854 (Domestic)

3 Ninjas Kick Back is a 1994 American martial arts film directed by Charles T. Kanganis. It is a sequel to the film 3 Ninjas. Despite being released as the second installment of the franchise, Kick Back is chronologically the third installment of the 3 Ninjas series. Originally the other sequel 3 Ninjas Knuckle Up was shot back-to-back with the first film and with the original cast, but due to distribution issues it was released in 1995. Max Elliott Slade is the only actor to reprise his role from the previous film as Jeffrey "Colt" Douglas, one of the three main characters. The film has a continuity error in which Mori's last name changes from Tanaka to Shintaro for no apparent reason.

It is the only film in the series to receive a video game adaptation.

== Plot ==
The three titular ninjas of the story, 13-year-old "Rocky", 12-year-old "Colt", and 7-year-old "Tum-Tum" are brothers experiencing the pressures of growing up. They frequently spend time training in the ninja arts with their grandfather, Mori Shintaro (Mori Tanaka in the previous film). Mori plans a trip for the four of them to Japan to take them to a martial arts tournament of which he was the champion fifty years ago. Only Tum-Tum seems interested in going, and even then, only out of interest in seeing sumo wrestlers due to how much food they get to eat. Mori tells the boys he hopes to return a dagger awarded to him at the tournament when he defeated a boy named Koga, so that it may be presented to the new winner. In Japan, a man later revealed to be Koga breaks into a museum and steals a sword before escaping via hang glider. At a baseball game, Rocky seems too focused on a cute girl to pitch properly, Tum-Tum causes constant breaks due to getting snacks, and Colt's temper causes a fight with the opposing team that causes the umpire to suspend the game for a week, driving a nail into the boys' plans to travel.

Meanwhile, back at Mori's cabin, a trio of thugs led by Koga's nephew, Glam, try to break into the house to steal the dagger. The boys manage to drive them off and dismiss it as an ordinary robbery attempt. Mori leaves for Japan alone, but the boys' father, Sam, accidentally gives him Tum-Tum's bag. Once he arrives in Japan, Mori's taxi is rear-ended by Glam and his friends, who steal his bag. After hearing from Mori at the hospital, the boys discover the bag mix-up and realize that they have the dagger. They arrange a trip with Mori's credit card and meet him in Japan. He instructs the boys to give the dagger to the Grand Master of the tournament. Glam and his friends record the conversation and deliver it to Koga, who punishes them for not retrieving the dagger. At the tournament, Colt steals a gi from an injured competitor where he loses to his female opponent, a girl named Miyo Shikigawa. She helps them deliver the dagger to the Grand Master, and allows the boys to stay with her and her mother. She has a love of baseball where she is a good power hitter, but is not very good at catching. The boys offer to train her in baseball if she trains them in martial arts. Rocky becomes fond of Miyo. The two almost kiss but they are distracted by Colt and Tum-Tum.

Koga attempts to trap the boys and retrieve the dagger himself by masquerading as the Grand Master, but the boys and Miyo catch onto his scheme and flee. They face several adversaries before they are finally captured. Meanwhile, Mori is kidnapped from the hospital by Ishikawa after fleeing Glam and the others. Koga forces Mori to tell him the location of the Cave of Gold, an urban legend which the sword and dagger are the keys to open. Fearing the safety for his grandsons, Mori agrees to aid Koga. Soon after, the children come up with a plan and escape Koga's fortress on hang gliders, arriving at the cave shortly after the adults. Inside, Koga and Mori realize the legend is true after they encounter walls and monuments of gold within. While the two battle each other, the boys and Miyo drop in on them and Koga pulls a gun. Using Mori's lesson on focus, Colt throws a ball bearing into the muzzle of the gun, causing it to backfire and start a cave-in. The group flees the cave, and Koga, now realizing the price of his greed, apologizes and leaves the group unharmed. Rocky realizes that they are a day ahead of America and that they can still make it home by the championship game.

At the game, the boys overcome their flaws. Down by two in the 9th inning, an opposing batter gets a hit off Rocky's pitch, until a new player, Miyo, catches the ball. In the bottom of the inning, Colt focuses and hits a home run, allowing all three boys to score and win the game. Members of the opposing team confront them after the game, and Darren, the team captain and the bicycle thief from the previous film, picks Miyo to fight for ruining his home run, which she politely agrees. Darren screams as she gets ready to attack him. The screen cuts to black as the fight begins.

== Cast ==
- Victor Wong as Mori "Shintarō" Tanaka, maternal grandfather and sensei to Rocky, Colt, and Tum-Tum.
- Max Elliott Slade as Jeffrey "Colt" Douglas, the middle child of the brothers.
- Sean Fox as Samuel "Rocky" Douglas Jr., the oldest of the three brothers.
- Evan Bonifant as Michael "Tum-Tum" Douglas, the youngest of the three brothers.
- Caroline Junko King as Miyo Shikigawa, a young Japanese martial artist who helps the brothers return the dagger.
- Dustin Nguyen as "Glam", Koga's wannabe rockstar nephew.
- Alan McRae as Sam Douglas Sr., father to Rocky, Colt, and Tum-Tum and an FBI Agent.
- Margarita Franco as Jessica Tanaka-Douglas, mother to Rocky, Colt, and Tum-Tum, Sam's wife and Mori's daughter.
- Jason Schombing as Vinnie, Glam's bandmate.
- Angelo Tiffe as "Slam", Glam's bandmate.
- Sab Shimono as Koga, Mori's arch enemy.
- Masashi "Killer Khan" Ozawa as Ishikawa, Koga's bodyguard.
- Scott Caudill as Darren, a known school bully and captain of the opposing baseball team.
- Shunichiro Yunoki as Grand Master
- Don Stark as Umpire

== Production ==
Shooting on the film began on May 17, 1993 and continued until July 21, 1993.

== Release ==
3 Ninjas Kick Back was theatrically released on May 6, 1994 followed by a home video release on September 21, 1994. Despite filming after 3 Ninjas Knuckle Up, the film was ultimately released as the second entry in the series while Knuckle Up would be released as the third.

== Reception ==
=== Box office ===
The film opened in the #3 position on opening weekend with a total of US$3,556,310. By the end of its 4-week run, the movie grossed $11,798,854 domestically.

=== Critical response ===
The film had a mostly negative reaction. On Rotten Tomatoes the film has an approval rating of 13% based on reviews from 15 critics. Scott Weinberg of eFilmCritic.com gave it 1 out of 5, saying it was "even worse than the original ... which was pretty dire to begin with". On Metacritic, the film has a score of 39 out of 100 based on 14 reviews, indicating "generally unfavorable" reviews.

== Sequel ==
A sequel titled 3 Ninjas Knuckle Up was released on March 10, 1995.

== Other media ==
=== Comic book ===
In 1994, NOW Comics published a three-part comic book adaptation of the movie, which was written by Clint McElroy.

=== Video game ===
In 1994, Sony Imagesoft published a video game adaption for the Sega Genesis, SNES, and Sega CD platforms.
