= Stuart Saves His Family =

- Theatrical release poster
- Directed by: Harold Ramis
- Written by: Al Franken
- Produced by: Trevor Albert; Lorne Michaels; C.O. Erickson; Dinah Minot; Whitney White
- Starring: Al Franken; Laura San Giacomo; Vincent D'Onofrio; Shirley Knight; Harris Yulin
- Cinematography: Lauro Escorel
- Edited by: Craig Herring; Pembroke Herring
- Music by: Marc Shaiman
- Production companies: Constellation Films; Broadway Video
- Distributed by: Paramount Pictures
- Release date: April 12, 1995
- Running time: 99 minutes
- Country: United States
- Language: English
- Budget: $12 million
- Box office: $912,082

Stuart Saves His Family is a 1995 American comedy film directed by Harold Ramis based on a series of Saturday Night Live sketches from the early to mid-1990s. The film follows the adventures of would-be self-help guru Stuart Smalley, a creation of comedian Al Franken, as he attempts to save both his deeply troubled family and his low-rated public-access television show. Some of the plot is inspired by Franken's book, I'm Good Enough, I'm Smart Enough, and Doggone It, People Like Me!: Daily Affirmations by Stuart Smalley.

The film was produced by Lorne Michaels. Co-stars include Laura San Giacomo, Vincent D'Onofrio, Shirley Knight, Lesley Boone and Harris Yulin. Julia Sweeney, Joe Flaherty, Robin Duke, Richard Riehle, future AEW ring announcer Justin Roberts and Kurt Fuller have cameo roles.

== Plot ==
Stuart Smalley is a Chicago resident who participates in several twelve-step programs and hosts Daily Affirmation, a self-help program on a public-access television station. After station manager Roz Weinstock moves the program from midday to an overnight time slot, Stuart loses his temper during a broadcast and insults her. Roz immediately cancels the show. Stuart attempts to make amends, but she dismisses his apology and reads him several hostile letters from viewers. Humiliated, Stuart isolates himself and returns to compulsive eating until his friends from his recovery groups intervene. Soon afterward, his sister, Jodie, calls to tell him that their aunt Paula has died.

Stuart returns to Minneapolis for the funeral and reunites with his family. His domineering father is an alcoholic, while his mother minimizes his behavior and attempts to manage the family through cooking and domestic work. Stuart’s older brother, Donnie, lives with their parents, drinks heavily and uses marijuana. Jodie struggles with compulsive overeating and rejects Stuart’s encouragement to return to treatment. Stuart recalls that Paula helped care for the children when they were young and provided some stability in their home.

At the cemetery, Stuart’s cousin Ray produces a court order preventing Paula from being buried in the Smalley family plot because of a dispute over ownership. Stuart’s father becomes violent and is arrested after confronting a police officer. The family relocates the burial to another cemetery. Stuart then returns to Chicago, hoping to resume his recovery and rebuild his career.

Jodie later informs Stuart that Donnie is suing her over Paula’s estate. Paula left the family a house worth approximately $60,000 and appointed Jodie as executor, but the sale cannot proceed because part of the house extends onto a neighboring property. Jodie had negotiated a $3,000 payment to the neighbor, Orville Egeberg, for an easement, but the family’s continuing arguments have prevented an agreement. Although Stuart’s friend and sponsor Julia warns him that he cannot rescue his relatives, he returns to Minneapolis and allows the family to appoint him executor.

Stuart meets Egeberg and attempts to negotiate a price lower than the previously discussed $3,000. Offended, Egeberg raises his demand to $10,000, and Stuart learns that his counteroffer has invalidated the earlier arrangement. Donnie and their father pressure Stuart to deny that the conversation occurred. The conflict worsens when members of the family obtain photocopies of Stuart’s private journal, in which he has recorded critical observations about them. Feeling betrayed and blamed for the estate’s problems, Stuart leaves Minneapolis.

Back in Chicago, Julia encourages Stuart to submit an episode of Daily Affirmation to the Health Cable Network. Because Stuart never kept recordings of the program, he returns to the public-access station and asks Roz for a tape. Roz demands $400, but Stuart secretly makes a copy when Mea, a timid station employee, Mea, leaves the tape unguarded. Roz discovers them and fires Mea. Stuart submits the recording, and the network offers him a paid series of twenty programs. He feature Mea as a guest on his first episode. Although the taping is initially awkward, it is successful, and the network hires Stuart to regularly film new episodes.

Stuart is then subpoenaed in the dispute over Paula’s house. Egeberg has died, and his nephew now demands $20,000 for the easement. Stuart’s father and Donnie have already denied under oath that the $10,000 agreement existed, and they pressure Stuart to support their account. Donnie promises to surrender his share of the estate to Jodie to support her son if Stuart lies. In court, however, Stuart tells the truth, resulting in a family meltdown. The Smalleys lose the case, and Stuart’s father and Donnie are convicted of perjury and sentenced to community service. Impressed by Stuart’s honesty, Egeberg’s nephew agrees to provide the easement for $10,000. Stuart concludes that he cannot change his relatives and is responsible only for his own actions.

While Stuart continues producing his television program, Jodie calls with another family emergency. During a hunting trip, Stuart’s intoxicated father mistook Donnie for a deer and shot him. Donnie survives, and Stuart returns to Minneapolis to visit him in the hospital. Their mother continues making excuses for her husband, but Donnie refuses whiskey that his father attempts to bring him and promises to stop drinking and using drugs. He apologizes to Stuart and admits that his hostility has partly resulted from jealousy of Stuart’s efforts to improve his life.

Stuart, Donnie and Jodie arrange a formal intervention with an addiction counselor. Their mother reluctantly participates, while each sibling describes the damage their father’s alcoholism has caused. Jodie recalls his drunken conduct at her weddings, Stuart explains that his father has never acknowledged his accomplishments, and Donnie admits that he has followed his father’s example and become an alcoholic himself. Stuart’s father mocks their statements and refuses to accept treatment. When presented with a choice between entering a rehabilitation facility and facing jail for shooting Donnie, he chooses jail and walks out. Their mother is unable to confront him.

Afterward, Stuart recognizes that his recurring fantasy of rescuing his helpless father has prevented him from accepting reality. At Christmas, he tells the audience of Daily Affirmation that his parents are no longer speaking to him and that he has decided not to return home. Although his family will never resemble the idealized families seen in holiday images, he accepts that recovery requires gradual progress rather than perfection. He celebrates Christmas with Julia, Mea and his friends from the recovery community. Donnie, having committed himself to sobriety, unexpectedly arrives at the studio party, and Stuart proudly introduces him as his brother.

== Cast ==
- Al Franken as Stuart Smalley
- Laura San Giacomo as Julia
- Vincent D'Onofrio as Donnie Smalley
- Shirley Knight as Mrs. Smalley
- Lesley Boone as Jodie Smalley
- Harris Yulin as Dad
- Kurt Fuller as Von Arks
- Julia Sweeney as Mea C.
- Joe Flaherty as Cousin Ray
- Robin Duke as Cousin Denise
- Camille Saviola as Roz Weinstock

== Production ==
Al Franken created and played the character Stuart Smalley in Saturday Night Live sketches; in 1992 Franken wrote a book, in character as Stuart, titled I'm Good Enough, I'm Smart Enough, and Doggone It, People Like Me!: Daily Affirmations by Stuart Smalley. After reading the book, Harold Ramis approached Franken about developing it into a movie. According to Franken, Ramis was largely responsible for making the movie happen.

== Reception ==
The film was a failure at the box office, earning only $912,082. This followed the box-office failures of other SNL-adaptations. Shortly after the movie left the theaters, Saturday Night Live featured a "Daily Affirmations with Stuart Smalley" sketch that parodied the poor box office returns. Stuart was depressed and bitter throughout the entire segment and lambasted the audience for choosing other movies (such as Dumb and Dumber and Bad Boys) over his.

In a 1999 appearance on The Howard Stern Show, Franken stated that he was "very proud" of the movie. However, in his 2003 book 'Oh, the Things I Know! A Guide to Success, or Failing That, Happiness, Franken mentioned his depression following the film's failure.

=== Critical response ===
On Rotten Tomatoes the film has an approval rating of 33% based on reviews from 27 critics. On Metacritic it has a weighted average score of 54% based on reviews from 16 critics. It received a nomination for Most Painfully Unfunny Comedy at the 1995 Stinkers Bad Movie Awards, which it lost to Ace Ventura: When Nature Calls.

Siskel & Ebert each gave the film a "thumbs up" rating, with Siskel calling it "smart and hip" and Ebert saying that "it has more courage than a lot of serious films."

== Home media ==
Stuart Saves His Family was released on VHS in October 1995; it was released on DVD on April 17, 2001. In 2007, the film was packaged with two other Lorne Michaels productions, Wayne's World and Coneheads, to be sold as a "triple feature". In 2013, Warner Bros. acquired the management of Paramount's DVD library, and added Stuart Saves His Family to their Warner Archive Collection.
