= 3 Ninjas Kick Back (video game) =

1994 video game

- North American SNES box art
- Developer(s): Malibu Interactive
- Publisher(s): Psygnosis (Genesis); Sony Imagesoft (SNES/Sega CD)
- Platform(s): Super NES, Genesis, Sega CD
- Release: SNES: NA: November 19, 1994; Genesis: NA: 1994; Sega CD: NA: 1994
- Genre(s): Beat 'em up, platform
- Mode(s): Single-player, multiplayer

3 Ninjas Kick Back is a beat 'em up platform game for the Sega Genesis, Super Nintendo Entertainment System, and Sega CD. It was released in 1994 and was developed by Malibu Interactive. The Genesis version was published by Psygnosis while the SNES and Sega CD versions were published by Sony Imagesoft. The Sega CD version was released exclusively in a bundle pack with another game Hook and was not released separately.

The game is based on the film of the same name.

== Plot ==
The master samurai competed in a ninja tournament fifty years ago for a magical dagger and an ancient samurai sword thought to be the key to opening a hidden cave full of treasure. After winning the tournament and rightfully gaining the dagger, it was stolen by the master's archrival, Koga. Though the master searched far and wide, he never found any trace of Koga or the dagger. Now, too old to continue searching, the master sends his three young apprentices, the young ninja brothers, Rocky, Colt, and Tum-Tum, to assist him in retrieving the prized dagger.

Once it has been restored to its rightful owner, the dagger shall once again be passed along to younger generations, through the winners of the ninja tournament.

== Gameplay ==
Colt fighting in The Woods zone.

There is an initial character screen, where one of the three brothers must be chosen as the main character. The game itself is a very standard side scrolling platform game. Each of the characters has their own unique weapon. Rocky has a bo, Colt uses a katana, and Tum-tum wields twin sai. Enemies consist of rebel ninjas working for Koga, wild animals such as dogs and bats, and hazards such as moving boulders and spikes.

There are several levels to the game, each one made up of smaller zones. The game progresses by running the character through each zone, and arriving at the other end. Each level has a minor boss, with the character having to defeat Koga as the final boss. Upon retrieval of the dagger, the character rejoins the master in Japan, returning to him his stolen dagger.

== Reception ==
Reviewing the SNES version, Tommy Glide of GamePro called the game a "below-average platform adventure", citing the last-generation character graphics and sometimes troublesome controls, though he did praise the sound effects and the two-player cooperative gameplay and acknowledged that "fans of the film might like it".
