= Joel Swetow =

American actor

- Born: December 30, 1951 (age 74); New York City, U.S.
- Occupation: Actor
- Years active: 1989–present

Joel Swetow (born December 30, 1951) is an American actor.

== Select filmography ==
=== Film ===
Year	Title	Role	Notes
1991	Prison Stories: Women on the Inside	Counselor D'Amico	Television film
1992	3 Ninjas	Mr. Nigel Brown	
1995	Lord of Illusions	Valentin	
1998	The Warlord: Battle for the Galaxy	Shahklan	Television film
2002	The President's Man: A Line in the Sand	Abdul Rashid	Television film
2003	Return to the Batcave: The Misadventures of Adam and Burt	Casting Director	Television film
2005	Rent	Mr. Cohen	
2010	Alice in Wonderland	Man with Large Belly in Red Queen Court	
2012	The Lorax	1st Marketing Guy	Voice
2018	The Grinch	Additional voices	

=== Television ===
Year	Title	Role	Notes
1993	Star Trek: Deep Space Nine	Gul Jasad	Episode: "Emissary"
1994	Star Trek: The Next Generation	Yog	Episode: "Firstborn"
2002	Stargate SG-1	First Chancellor Valis of Kelowna on Langara	Episode: "Shadow Play"
2002–2005	Charmed	Avatar Alpha	10 Episodes
2003	Alias	Jens	Episode: "Second Double"
2005	Star Trek: Enterprise	Andorian Ambassador Thoris	Episode: "Terra Prime"
2007	Burn Notice	Eli Zamar	Episode "Family Business"
2007	Days of Our Lives	Dr. Granger	5 Episodes
2010	Lego Hero Factory	Rotor / Meltdown	Voice, 3 episodes
2014	Selfie	Keynote Speaker	Episode: "Here's This Guy"
2016	Mad Dogs	Abram	2 Episodes
2016	Swedish Dicks	Oscar	Episode: "Tale of the Tape"
2016	2 Broke Girls	Father Kozac	Episode: "And the Godmama Drama"
2017	Rosewood	Zavier Salvas	Episode: "Asphyxiation & Aces"
2017	The Orville	Krill Captain	Episode: "Old Wounds"
2017	The Brave	Ambassador Dimitri Grombyko	Episode: "Stealth"
2018–2020	Kidding	Rabbi Michael Epstein	5 Episodes
2019	Bunk'd	Pa Gordon	Episode: "Lone Wolf"
2019	Silicon Valley	Rod Morgenstern	Episode: "Exit Event"
2019–2021	Young Justice	Richard Swift / Shade	Voice, 2 episodes
2020	Lucifer	Nils Schuhmann (Opera singer)	Episode: "Mojo"
2022	American Horror Stories	Mr. Hendricks	Episode: "Aura"

=== Videogames ===
Year	Title	Role	Notes
1994	Off-World Interceptor	Colonel Fancy	
2000	Star Trek: Armada	Additional voices	Credited as Joel Sweton
2000	Star Trek: Invasion	Cardassian Commander / Borg	
2000	Star Trek: Voyager – Elite Force	Unseen Alien / Borg	
2001	Star Trek: Armada II	Additional voices	
2009	Infamous	Male Pedestrian	
2011	Dead or Alive: Dimensions	Tengu	English dub
2013	Grand Theft Auto V	The Local Population	
2019	Call of Duty: Modern Warfare	The Wolf	

=== Audio books ===
Year	Title	Role	Note
2015	Rain of the Ghosts	Bernie Cohen	Opposite his real life wife Deborah Strang as Maude Cohen
