= Endless Bummer (film) =

National Lampoon Presents Endless Bummer
- DVD cover
- Directed by: Sam Pillsbury
- Written by: John Drury and John F. Sullivan
- Produced by: Steven Siebert
- Starring: Jim Piddock
- Cinematography: Chris Moseley
- Music by: Jay Ferguson
- Production company: Lighthouse Entertainment
- Release date: June 28, 2009 (US)
- Country: United States
- Language: English

National Lampoon Presents Endless Bummer aka Surf Party is an American 2009 comedy film directed by Sam Pillsbury, starring Jim Piddock and Khan Chittenden. The plot involves a group of teens and a veteran surfer, who take a road trip from Ventura, California to the San Fernando Valley, in order to track down a prized stolen surfboard.

== Cast ==
- Jim Piddock as Mr. Newell
- Ray Santiago as Lardo
- Khan Chittenden as J.D.
- Vanessa Angel as Brenda
- Colton James as "Sparky"
- Allison Scagliotti as Iris
- Caitlin Wachs as Anne
- Jane Leeves as Liv
- Matthew Lillard as Mike Mooney
- Jules Bruff as Carol
- James J. Thomas as Richard
- Joan Jett as Del
- Richmond Arquette as Harry
- Kathleen Wilhoite as Peggy
- Kenny Laguna as Mr. Canadianedas
- Sara Downing as Ginger Mooney
- Andrew Caldwell as Kenny
- James Remar as Sam Kramer
- Lee Ving as Hot Rod Guy
- Debbie DeLisi as Hot Rod Girl
- Scott Caudill as Creepy Guy #1
- Jeff Staron as Creepy Guy #2
- Shayne Lamas as Volleyball Bikini Girl
- Gabriel Jarret as Gabe
- Affion Crockett as "Coco"
