= Richard Marvin (composer) =

American score composer

Richard Marvin is an American film composer, who is known for composing scores for television shows and motion picture films.

Rick is best known for his soundtrack collaboration for the 2000 film U-571 and the 2009 sci-fi film Surrogates.

He is also known for composing the music for the 2006-2009 CBS Paramount Television logo.

== Filmography ==
- Flight of Black Angel (1991) (TV movie)
- 3 Ninjas (1992)
- 3 Ninjas Kick Back (1994)
- The Legend of Galgameth (1996)
- Balloon Farm (1999)
- U-571 (2000)
- Six Feet Under (2001) (TV series)
- The Battle of Shaker Heights (2003)
- In Treatment (2008) (TV series)
- The Narrows (2008)
- Surrogates (2009)
- Grimm (2011) (TV Series)
- Lincoln Rhyme: Hunt for the Bone Collector (2020) (TV Series)
