= Scooter Page =

American actor and musician

- Born: Scott Caudill; San Pedro, California, U.S.
- Origin: Los Angeles, California, U.S.
- Genres: Pop, rock, dance, alternative, soul
- Occupations: Musician, singer-songwriter, actor
- Instruments: Vocals; piano; guitar; bass guitar
- Years active: 1992–present

Scooter Page (born Scott Caudill), is an American actor, musician and songwriter from San Pedro, California.

== Early life ==
Page was born and raised in San Pedro, California. Page attended San Pedro High School. Since he was young, Scooter has enjoyed writing songs and stories. At age 15, he made his acting debut as one of the Newsies Dancers in Disney's Newsies (1992). This led to roles in 3 Ninjas (1992) as well as 3 Ninjas Kick Back (1994) and a steady career in film and television.

== Acting career ==
Page, whose film and TV work is credited by his birth name, Scott Caudill, has appeared in various films and television shows since his first appearance in Disney's Newsies (1992). Later that year, he was cast as Daren in 3 Ninjas and its 1994 sequel, 3 Ninjas Kick Back. In 2002, he appeared as Blaine in Wishcraft, a supernatural thriller, in which he co-starred with Meatloaf, who became a close on-set friend and adviser. Page is also known for his roles in Peaceful Warrior (2006) and National Lampoon's Endless Bummer (2009).

In addition to his film career, Page has appeared in guest roles on numerous television shows including CSI: Crime Scene Investigation ("Sounds of Silence" – 2001), The Mentalist ("Rose-Colored Glasses" – 2010), Bones ("The Devil in the Detail" – 2010), Saving Grace ("You Think I'm Gonna Eat My Gun?" – 2010), and many more. In 2004, he landed a recurring role on CBS's The Young and the Restless (Episode #1.7815, #1.7816 – 2004) as "D." Then, in 2007, he was cast as Dwayne/Duane, the biker in TeenNick’s Beyond the Break ("Vin, Lose, or Draw" – 2006, "Fiji Open" – 2007).

== Dancing career ==
In 1999, Page was part of the dance team that performed “Wild, Wild West” with Will Smith and Dru Hill at the MTV Movie Awards. Page performed again with Smith at KIIS FM's 1999 Wango Tango concert held at Dodger Stadium. He was also featured in several music videos, including Carlos Santana's "Maria Maria" (1999), which featured Wyclef Jean, Billy Crawford's "Mary Lopez" (1999), and Nobody's Angel’s "Wanna Dance" (1999).

== Music career ==
In 1999, Page released his first album, Point In Time, under the pseudonym Jesic, a contraction of Jesus and music. Shortly after the release of his first album, Page went on to release his second studio EP, 4 Now 6 Later, which was independently released in 2002. Here2Hear, released in 2011, was the last album that Page released using this pseudonym. The albums released during this time were a mix of R&B and pop styles with rock influence consisting of uplifting lyrics inspired by Page's Christian-based world view.

In 2014, Page dropped the Jesic pseudonym and opted to go by Scooter Page. Along with the change in name, the sound of his music shifted towards a pop/rock sound with more personal lyrics inspired by life experiences. The first album created using his new name was Evolution To Better Days and was released in 2014. It was recorded at Hemispheres Recording Studio in Nashville, Tennessee, and featured Page and James Lugo as Co-Producers. Lugo is best known for his engineering work with artists such as The Smashing Pumpkins, Snoop Dogg, Bruce Springsteen, and Rod Stewart. The album's first single, "I Miss Home (Not)," was released under the TMG/LRT record label distributed by Universal Music Group and was featured on Vevo Video.

Page's latest album, 4224, was released in 2019. In a feature article published by Buzz Music, 4224 is described as featuring “heavy instrumentals filled with enough emotion while still remaining gritty, alternative rock. With elements of classic rock mixed with contemporary rhythms and a powerful sound, 4224 is an intense album.”

The album includes singles "If You Were Me" and "King of the Night" and features Page, Ricko Baird, and James Lugo in the writer credits. The singles help to further express Page's artistry, executing dynamic shifts in both sound and melody.

In support of Page's latest album, he has performed in clubs around the LA area with such acts as The Red Jumpsuit Apparatus, Drake Bell, and Alien Ant Farm.

== Style and influence ==
Page's music crosses the boundaries of many different genres but overall is considered alternative pop/rock soul. He is influenced by a wide range of musical acts including Prince, Jack White, Fall Out Boy, Marvin Gaye, Eminem, Aerosmith, and Snoop Dogg. These inspirations are made clear by the energy he brings to his live performances which have been cited as contagious and irreplaceable- an experience in itself.

In order to gain songwriting inspiration, Page pulls from the genres of music he listened to while growing up including R&B, hip hop, rock and dance.

== Other work ==
Page formed his production company, Marbleized Corporation, in 2016 in order to manage his writing, acting, recordings, and production projects.

In the summer of 2016, Page began work on his first novel, The Longshore Entertainer, a fictional story based on the juxtaposition of his own experiences as a dock worker and an entertainer.

== Filmography ==
=== Film ===
Year	Title	Role	Director
1992	Newsies	Newsies Dancer	Kenny Ortega
1992	3 Ninjas	Bully	Jon Turtletaub
1994	3 Ninjas Kick Back	Darren the Bully	Charles T. Kanganis
2002	Wishcraft	Blaine	Richard Wenk
2006	Peaceful Warrior	Thug #1	Victor Salva
2009	Endless Bummer	Creepy Guy #1	Sam Pillsbury

=== Television ===
Year	Title	Episode	Role
1999	Shasta McNasty	S1, E3: "Adult Education"	Bully
2001	CSI: Crime Scene Investigation	S1, E20: "Sounds of Silence"	Paul Arrington
2001	Any Day Now	S4, E1: "Don't Forget to Take Out Your Teeth"	Max
2002	Judging Amy	S3, E13: "The Cook of the Money Pot"	Benny
2004	The Young and the Restless	#1.7815	D
2004	The Young and the Restless	#1.7816	D
2004	Cold Case	S1, E16: "Volunteers"	Elliot Karp
2005	Close to Home	S1, E8: "Under Threat"	Michael Hale
2005	Sleeper Cell	S1, E1: "Al Faitha"	Teen #3
2006	Beyond the Break	S1, E7: "Vin, Lose, or Draw"	Duane the Biker
2007	Beyond the Break	S2, E4: "Fiji Open"	Dwayne
2010	The Mentalist	S2, E11: "Rose-Colored Glasses"	Stu McAlpine
2010	Bones	S5, E14: "The Devil in the Detail"	Gabe Turner
2010	Saving Grace	S3, E17: "You Think I'm Gonna Eat My Gun?"	Craig Hoffstadt

== Discography ==
=== Albums ===
Pseudonym	Year	Title
Jesic	1999	Point In Time
	2002	4 Now 6 Later
	2011	Here2Hear
Scooter Page	2014	Evolution to Better Days
	2019	4224
	2021	DANCAPAGELECTROLAND

=== Singles ===
Pseudonym	Year	Title	Album
Scooter Page	2013	"I Miss Home (Not!)"	Evolution to Better Days
	2013	"The Day"	Evolution to Better Days
	2018	"If You Were Me"	4224
	2018	"King of the Night"	4224
	2019	"King of the Night (Kahlid Woods Remix)"	Non-Album single
	2020	"Music Mood"	DANCAPAGELECTROLAND
	2020	"You're Me"	DANCAPAGELECTROLAND
	2020	"Love With You"	DANCAPAGELECTROLAND
