= David Rennie (film editor) =

American film editor

- Born: Buffalo, New York, U.S.
- Occupation: Film editor

David Rennie (born in Buffalo, New York) is an American film editor with more than 12 film credits since 1992. Rennie has been elected to membership in the American Cinema Editors.

== Selected filmography ==
Editor
Year	Film	Director	Notes
1992	3 Ninjas	Jon Turteltaub	Second collaboration with Jon Turteltaub
1994	3 Ninjas Kick Back	Charles T. Kanganis	
1997	Home Alone 3	Raja Gosnell	
1999	Office Space	Mike Judge	First collaboration with Mike Judge
2000	The Kid	Jon Turteltaub	Fifth collaboration with Jon Turteltaub
2002	The Sweetest Thing	Roger Kumble	
2002	The New Guy	Ed Decter	
2006	Idiocracy	Mike Judge	Second collaboration with Mike Judge
2006	Tenacious D in The Pick of Destiny	Liam Lynch	
2007	National Treasure: Book of Secrets	Jon Turteltaub	Sixth collaboration with Jon Turteltaub
2009	Race to Witch Mountain	Andy Fickman	First collaboration with Andy Fickman
2010	You Again	Andy Fickman	Second collaboration with Andy Fickman
2012	Journey 2: The Mysterious Island	Brad Peyton	
2013	Last Vegas	Jon Turteltaub	Seventh collaboration with Jon Turteltaub
2014	22 Jump Street	Phil Lord; Christopher Miller	
2015	Masterminds	Jared Hess	
2016	Keeping Up with the Joneses	Greg Mottola	
2018	Gringo	Nash Edgerton	
2018	Goosebumps 2: Haunted Halloween	Ari Sandel	
2020	Downhill	Nat Faxon; Jim Rash	
2021	Home Sweet Home Alone	Dan Mazer	
2023	Strays	Josh Greenbaum	
2023	Dashing Through the Snow	Tim Story	

Editorial department
Year	Film	Director	Role	Notes
1989	Think Big	Jon Turteltaub	Assistant editor	First collaboration with Jon Turteltaub
1991	Blood and Concrete	Jeffrey Reiner	Assistant editor	First collaboration with Jeffrey Reiner
1991	Rock 'n' Roll High School Forever	Deborah Brock	Second assistant editor	
1992	Where the Day Takes You	Marc Rocco	Assistant editor	First collaboration with Marc Rocco
1993	Trouble Bound	Jeffrey Reiner	Assistant editor	Second collaboration with Jeffrey Reiner
1995	Murder in the First	Marc Rocco	Assistant editor	Second collaboration with Marc Rocco
1995	While You Were Sleeping	Jon Turteltaub	First assistant editor	Third collaboration with Jon Turteltaub
1996	Two If by Sea	Bill Bennett	First assistant editor	
1996	Phenomenon	Jon Turteltaub	Associate editor	Fourth collaboration with Jon Turteltaub
1997	Volcano	Mick Jackson	Assistant editor	
1997	Titanic	James Cameron	Assistant editor	
1999	The Other Sister	Garry Marshall	First assistant editor	
2007	Skills like This	Monty Miranda	Consulting editor	

Sound department
Year	Film	Director	Role
1991	Blood and Concrete	Jeffrey Reiner	Assistant sound editor

Documentaries

Thanks
Year	Film	Director	Role
1993	Theremin: An Electronic Odyssey	Steven M. Martin	Special thanks

TV movies

Editor
Year	Film	Director
1999	Evolution's Child	Jeffrey Reiner

TV series

Editor
Year	Title	Notes
2000	The Huntress	1 episode
2002−05	American Dreams	61 episodes
