= Max Elliott Slade =

American former child actor (born 1980)

- Born: Max Slade; July 4, 1980 (age 45); Pasadena, California, U.S.
- Years active: 1989–2008; 2019

Max Elliott Slade (born July 4, 1980) is an American former child actor who starred in 3 Ninjas, 3 Ninjas Kick Back, and 3 Ninjas Knuckle Up as the character named Jeffrey Douglas, later nicknamed Colt by his grandfather Mori Tanaka. He was the middle child of the Douglas family in the films. He was featured as Jay Lovell in Apollo 13, young Mark Goddard in The Sweeper, and young Gil Buckman in Parenthood.

Slade earned a brown belt in Gosoku-ryū karate at age 11.

Slade began his acting career in 1989 playing Young Gil Buckman in Parenthood. In 1990, he played Kevin Buckman in twelve episodes of Parenthood. In 1991, he played Willy in the made-for-TV film To the Moon, Alice. In 1992, he played Jeffrey Colt Douglas in 3 Ninjas; he reprised the role in 3 Ninjas Kick Back and 3 Ninjas Knuckle Up, which were released in 1994 and 1995 respectively. Though the latter was released last, it was the second film of the series to be made and is the second chronologically. In 1995, he played Jay Lovell in Apollo 13. Afterwards, he played Mark in the direct-to-TV film The Sweeper.

== Filmography ==
=== Film ===
Year	Title	Role	Notes
1989	Parenthood	Young Gil Buckman	
1992	3 Ninjas	Jeffrey "Colt" Douglas	
1994	3 Ninjas Kick Back	Jeffrey "Colt" Douglas	
1995	3 Ninjas Knuckle Up	Jeffrey "Colt" Douglas	Filmed in 1992, but not released until 1995
1995	Apollo 13	James "Jay" Lovell	
1996	The Sweeper	Young Mark	Direct-to-Video Release
2008	Frost/Nixon	Camera Operator (Smith crew)	Uncredited
2019	We Are Love	Bobby	Short film

=== Television ===
Year	Title	Role	Notes
1990	Parenthood	Kevin Buckman	12 episodes
1991	To the Moon, Alice	Willy	TV movie
