= List of films about automobiles =

The following is a list of films about automobiles, whose plots focus on, or prominently feature, cars and other automobiles.

== List of films ==
- The First Auto (1927), about the transition from horses to cars for transportation, and the rift it causes in a family.
- The Crowd Roars (1932), James Cagney stars as a race care driver in this 1st sound car racing film.
- Death Drives Through (1935), the protagonist is a race-car driver.
- Dodsworth (1936), the protagonist owns a car factory.
- The Magnificent Ambersons (1942), the protagonist forbids his mother from marrying an automobile tycoon.
- Buck Privates Come Home (1947), two ex-soldiers help a young race-car driver.
- The Big Wheel (1949), the protagonist is a race-car driver.
- To Please a Lady (1950), the protagonist is a race-car driver.
- Susie the Little Blue Coupe (1952), short animated film by Walt Disney Productions, which charts the life of an anthropomorphic blue coupe.
- The Yellow Rolls-Royce (1964), charts three generations of owners of a Rolls-Royce Phantom II.
- The Great Race (1965), comedy loosely based on the 1908 New York to Paris Race.
- What on Earth! (1966), short animated mockumentary in which Martians mistake automobiles as Earth's dominant species.
- Chitty Chitty Bang Bang (1968), musical film about a magical car.
- The Love Bug (1968), a comedy film about an anthropomorphic 1963 Volkswagen Beetle racecar named Herbie.
- Monte Carlo or Bust! (1969), comedy based on the Monte Carlo Rally in the 1920s.
- Ma chi t'ha dato la patente? (1970), Italian comedy about a driving school.
- Le Mans (1971), action film about a fictional running of the 24 Hours of Le Mans race.
- Vanishing Point (1971), action road film prominently featuring a Dodge Challenger.
- Duel (1971), thriller film directed by Steven Spielberg of a road rage chase featuring a Peterbilt 281 tanker truck and a 1971 Plymouth Valiant.
- Killdozer (1974), made-for-TV horror movie based on a short story of the same name by Theodore Sturgeon.
- Gone in 60 Seconds (1974), a film about an insurance agent who is also a professional car thief who must steal 48 vehicles over the course of five days.
- Herbie Rides Again (1974), second film in the Herbie series.
- Race with the Devil (1975), occult thriller film that blends the car chase and horror genres.
- The Car (1977), about an anthropomorphic customized 1971 Lincoln Continental Mark III.
- Smokey and the Bandit (1977), about two bootleggers running liquor from Texarkana to Atlanta in a 1977 Pontiac Firebird Trans Am and 1973/4 Kenworth W900A.
- Herbie Goes to Monte Carlo (1977), third film in the Herbie series, centered on a race between Paris and Monte Carlo.
- Corvette Summer (1978), about a teenager and his stolen Corvette Stingray.
- Mad Max (1979), an Australian film franchise about a police office named Max and his Ford Falcon XB police car called the Pursuit Special aka the V8 Interceptor.
- The Hearse (1980), a horror movie about a possessed hearse.
- Herbie Goes Bananas (1980), fourth film in the Herbie series.
- The Devil at Your Heels (1981), documentary about daredevil Ken Carter's attempt to jump a rocket-powered car over the Saint Lawrence River.
- Goodbye Pork Pie (1981), a New Zealand comedy film featuring a yellow Mini Cooper as well as many other vehicles as the centrepiece of the plot, featuring many stunt and driving action sequences.
- Christine (1983), directed by John Carpenter, about a sentient 1958 Plymouth Fury, based on the novel by Stephen King.
- Nightmares (1983), a film consisting of four separate story segments; the third, "The Benediction", features a traveling priest (played by Lance Henriksen) attacked on the highway by a demonic pickup truck
- Dionysos (1984), a French film about a factory attempting to build the world's first car.
- Back to the Future (1985), a franchise about a teenage boy named Marty McFly and a scientist named Doc Brown going on an adventure in their time machine made out of a 1981 DMC DeLorean.
- Maximum Overdrive (1986), a horror film based on the short story "Trucks" by Stephen King, where semi-trucks and other inanimate objects come to life and start killing people.
- The Wraith (1986), starring Charlie Sheen, who plays a man murdered by a gang of car thieves who gets revenge upon his killers by returning as a phantom car and driver set out to eliminate them.
- Tucker: The Man and His Dream (1988), a film about the development of the Tucker automobile.
- Pink Cadillac (1989), about a bounty hunter and a group of white supremacists chasing a woman in a pink Cadillac.
- Wheels of Terror (1990), a 1990 made-for-TV film about a mysterious car with an unseen driver terrorizing a small Arizona community.
- Coupe de Ville (1990) A dying father has his three very different sons drive a 1954 Cadillac de Ville convertible home as a gift to their mother, teaching the boys the meaning of family and love.
- Crash (1996), directed by David Cronenberg, about a group of people who find sexual pleasure in car crashes.
- Trucks (1997), a made-for-TV remake film based on the short story of the same name by Stephen King.
- The Love Bug (1997), fifth film in the Herbie series, made for TV as a remake/continuation of the 1968 film The Love Bug.
- Black Dog (1998), an action film starring Patrick Swayze, Randy Travis and Meat Loaf about a trucker and ex-con who is manipulated into transporting illegal firearms. Similar to The Fast and the Furious (2001), but with semi trucks.
- Gone in 60 Seconds (2000), remake of the 1974 film about car thieves.
- The Fast and the Furious (2001), a franchise of films about street racing and car heists; the first film was released in 2001.
- The Magnificent Ambersons (2002), remake of the 1942 film.
- The Transporter (2002), about a driver for hire – a mercenary "transporter" who will deliver anything, anywhere – no questions asked – for the right price. The car used in the movie was a BMW.
- 2 Fast 2 Furious (2003), sequel of The Fast and the Furious (2001).
- Transporter 2 (2005), sequel of The Transporter (2002), with the same concept but the car used in the movie is the new Audi A8 W12.
- Herbie: Fully Loaded (2005), sixth film in the Herbie series.
- Cars (2006), animated film by Pixar.
- The Fast and the Furious: Tokyo Drift (2006), third part of the series; shot in Tokyo and Los Angeles; most of the races are on the Tokyo streets.
- Death Proof (2007), directed by Quentin Tarantino, about a stuntman and his killer car.
- Speed Racer (2008), directed by The Wachowskis, about the eponymous racecar driver participating in fantastic races. Based on the 1960s manga and anime series of the same name.
- Death Race (2008), with star Jason Statham, remake of Death Race 2000 (1975).
- Gran Torino (2008), about a young man who conspires to steal his neighbor's Ford Gran Torino.
- Dolan's Cadillac (2009), based on the Stephen King story, about a schoolteacher whose wife is murdered by a man in a bulletproof Cadillac.
- Fast & Furious (2009), serves as a connection from the first film into a present-day setting, with main members of the original cast reprising their roles.
- Road Kill (2010), an Australian supernatural thriller about a group of teenagers who are menaced by a driverless road train in the harsh Australian outback.
- Cars 2 (2011), animated children's film by Pixar.
- Death Race 2 (2011), prequel to Death Race (2008).
- Drive (2011), an action film about a stunt performer who also works as a getaway driver.
- Fast Five (2011), follows Dominic Toretto (Vin Diesel), Brian O'Conner (Paul Walker), and Mia Toretto (Jordana Brewster) as they plan a heist to steal $100 million from a corrupt businessman.
- Death Race 3: Inferno (2013), sequel to Death Race 2 (2010) and prequel to Death Race (2008).
- Super Hybrid (2011), science fiction thriller film about a malicious shape-shifting sentient car that devours its victims by tricking them into its cab.
- Fast & Furious 6 (2013), the sixth installment in The Fast and the Furious.
- Need for Speed (2014), stars Aaron Paul as street racer Tobey Marshall, who sets off to race cross-country, as a way of avenging his friend's death at the hands of a rival racer (Dominic Cooper).
- Furious 7 (2015), the first installment in the franchise to take place after Tokyo Drift. The film also marks the final film appearance of Paul Walker, who died in a car accident.
- Mad Max: Fury Road (2015), set in a future desert wasteland where gasoline and water are scarce commodities.
- Monster Trucks (2016), about a mysterious creature who takes control of a pickup truck that was built in a junkyard.
- The Fate of the Furious (2017), when a mysterious woman seduces Dom into the world of terrorism and a betrayal of those closest to him, the crew face trials that will test them as never before.
- Cars 3 (2017), animated children's film by Pixar, scheduled for release on 16 June 2017.
- Baby Driver (2017), a young getaway driver finds himself taking part in a heist doomed to fail.
- Bumblebee (2018), about a robot superhero that can transform into a 1967 Volkswagen Beetle.
- Ford v Ferrari (2019), action drama film about the building and racing of the Ford GT40 for the 1966 edition of 24 Hours of Le Mans.
- Lamborghini: The Man Behind the Legend (2022), the story of Ferruccio Lamborghini trying to get his untested car prepped for a victory at the upcoming Geneva Grand Prix.

== In television ==
- "A Thing about Machines", 1960 episode of The Twilight Zone
- "You Drive", 1964 episode of The Twilight Zone in which the car of a hit-and-run driver hounds him to confession.
- My Mother the Car, 1965 television sitcom series.
- Knight Rider, a franchise begun in 1982, featuring an artificially intelligent third generation Pontiac Firebird Trans Am named KITT (Knight Industries Two Thousand). Several episodes also feature an evil version of KITT named KARR (Knight Automated Roving Robot).
- "The Honking", 2000 Futurama episode in which the robot character, Bender, is possessed by a were-virus, transforming him into a murderous car every night at midnight. The curse can only be lifted by destroying the originator of the virus, a project-Satan car located at the "Anti-Chrysler" building. The car that hits Bender is a 1958 Plymouth, just like the one in Christine.
- "Route 666", a 2006 Supernatural episode about a driverless black Dodge utiline truck in Cape Girardeau, Missouri killing everyone related to its owner's past.
- "Christrina", a Grojband episode in which Kin's dream-catching camera messes up and releases Trina's soul from her body and into her car, bringing her car to life. Trina becomes angry about this and goes on a rampage destroying everything in her car body.
