= Herbie (franchise) =

Disney media franchise about a sentient 1963 Volkswagen Beetle

- Official home video release, boxset collection artwork. The design is based on Herbie: Fully Loaded
- Created by: Bill Walsh; Don DaGradi
- Original work: The Love Bug (1968)
- Owner: The Walt Disney Company
- Years: 1968–2005
- Based on: "Car, Boy, Girl" by Gordon Buford

The Herbie franchise consists of American sports adventure comedy theatrical feature films, one television film, a television series, and other multimedia releases. The overall story centers around the titular Herbie, a sentient anthropomorphic 1963 Volkswagen Beetle with a mind of his own and capable of driving himself. The vehicle is oftentimes a legitimate contender, though the underdog contestant in competitive races, but to a greater degree assists his human owners in bettering their lives.

The first film, notable for being the final live-action film produced under the supervision by Walt Disney prior to his death, was released in 1969. Based on a story titled "Car, Boy, Girl", the feature proved to be a critical and financial success for Walt Disney Productions. Upon its release, the movie was the second-highest-grossing film for the company, second only to Mary Poppins (1964). Its performance placed it fourth highest on box office returns, and spawned a franchise. Each of the subsequent releases were successes in their own right, but none received as much universal praise as the original.

The second film was met with generally positive reception from critics. The third film was met with mixed reception, while the fourth film was met with mixed to negative reviews and is often classified as the weakest Herbie film. The television series was panned by critics, resulting in a cancellation following five episodes, with reviews calling it "domesticated", "mild", and "boring". The fifth film was met with negative reviews, citing its inferiority to the original. The sixth film was met with mixed reception, and garnered the highest box-office returns out of all of the installments. Though the film was criticized for various aspects including the plot, it was seen as a return to form for the franchise.

== Origin ==
In 1961, a short story titled "Car, Boy, Girl" was written by Gordon Buford. In an interview with a United States publication for Volkswagen owners titled Small World Magazine, Buford stated that the idea for his story came from growing up on a Colorado farm, where he witnessed how his parents treated their vehicles with a similar manner as they did their horses. As the story was not published, it is believed that it was presented directly to Walt Disney and had its film rights purchased by Walt Disney Productions shortly thereafter. The Love Bug was the last live-action film produced by Disney before Walt Disney's death.

== Films ==
Film	U.S. release date	Director	Screenwriter(s)	Story by	Producer(s)
The Love Bug	March 13, 1969	Robert Stevenson	Bill Walsh and Don DaGradi	Bill Walsh and Don DaGradi	Bill Walsh
Herbie Rides Again	June 6, 1974	Robert Stevenson	Bill Walsh	Bill Walsh	Bill Walsh
Herbie Goes to Monte Carlo	June 24, 1977	Vincent McEveety	Arthur Alsberg & Don Nelson	Arthur Alsberg & Don Nelson	Ron Miller
Herbie Goes Bananas	June 25, 1980	Vincent McEveety	Don Tait	Don Tait	Ron Miller
The Love Bug	November 30, 1997	Peyton Reed	Ryan Rowe	Ryan Rowe	Joan Van Horn and Irwin Marcus
Herbie: Fully Loaded	June 22, 2005	Angela Robinson	Thomas Lennon & Robert Ben Garant and Alfred Gough & Miles Millar	Thomas Lennon & Robert Ben Garant and Mark Perez	Robert Simonds

=== The Love Bug (1968) ===
Has-been professional race car driver Jim Douglas and his philosophical mechanic Tennessee Steinmetz find themselves in possession of a white Volkswagen Beetle that seems to have a mind and spirit of its own. Naming the car Herbie, Jim and Tennessee become the talk of the California racing circuit. Sports-car dealer and circuit contestant Peter Thorndyke tries to use his assistant to come between the friends and their car.

=== Herbie Rides Again (1974) ===
Alonzo P. Hawk is a mean-spirited property developer who has bought several blocks of land in the downtown district in order to build a gigantic shopping mall. There is one problem however; an elderly widow named Mrs. Steinmetz who won't sell the one remaining lot that Hawk needs to proceed with his scheme. So he resorts to all manner of chicanery, legal or otherwise, to get it. After they discover Alonzo's plans, it's up to Herbie to save the day and save Mrs. Steinmetz's home.

=== Herbie Goes to Monte Carlo (1977) ===
Jim Douglas, reunited with Herbie, finds himself once again hitting the roads in a race car event. This time, Jim and Herbie, along with goofy mechanic Wheely Applegate compete in a French competition. Also involved in the automotive adventure are Quincey and Max, a pair of jewel thieves, and Diane Darcy, the beautiful woman who drives Giselle, a sporty female car and Herbie's love interest.

=== Herbie Goes Bananas (1980) ===
Jim's nephew, Pete and his friend D.J., board a cruise ship called the Sun Princess to Panama to enter Herbie in the Brazil Grand Primero. Unknown to them, a young pickpocket named Paco has stowed away in Herbie's trunk, as a trio of gold counterfeiters pursue the youngster in an attempt to retrieve the location of a source of ancient Inca gold.

=== The Love Bug (1997) ===
Herbie, the inimitable VW Beetle is destined for the scrap heap, until down-on-his-luck mechanic Hank Cooper takes him over and gives him a new lease of life, much to the fury of his previous owner, who builds a menacing, evil, black Beetle to challenge Herbie and Hank to a one-on-one race.

Released as a made-for-television movie, as a part of The Magical World of Walt Disney, this installment was marketed as a remake. Events of the film reveal it is in fact a sequel to the previous films.

=== Herbie: Fully Loaded (2005) ===
Maggie Peyton wants to become a NASCAR driver but her overprotective father, Ray Peyton Sr. won't hear of it. A former racer himself, Ray wants Maggie to take a lucrative television sportscasting job and leave the dangers of driving to her crash-prone brother. When Ray Sr. takes Maggie to a junkyard to pick out a car, she has no idea that the little Volkswagen Beetle, named Herbie, she takes home will change her life.

== Television ==
Official promotional poster for the short-lived television series.

=== Live-action ===
==== Herbie, the Love Bug (1982) ====
A television series based on, and a continuation of, the film series was developed and released from March 17 – April 14, 1982. The series was released as a mid-season replacement to a cancelled show, and was given the 8:00 P.M. time slot. Developed and executive produced by William Robert Yates, the television show was written by Arthur Alsberg, Don Nelson, and Don Tait. The production was produced by Walt Disney Productions, and distributed by Buena Vista Television. The series, which aired on the Columbia Broadcasting System, did not receive a second season.

Episodes

Nº	Title	U.S. airdate	Director	Written by	Producers
1	"Herbie the Matchmaker"	March 17, 1982	Charles S. Dubin	Arthur Alsberg & Don Nelson	William Robert Yates and Kevin Corcoran
2	"Herbie to the Rescue"	March 24, 1982	Vincent McEveety	Arthur Alsberg & Don Nelson	William Robert Yates and Kevin Corcoran
3	"My House is Your House"	March 31, 1982	Bill Bixby	Don Tait	William Robert Yates and Kevin Corcoran
4	"Herbie, the Best Man"	April 7, 1982	Vincent McEveety	Arthur Alsberg & Don Nelson	William Robert Yates and Kevin Corcoran
5	"Calling Dr. Herbie"	April 14, 1982	Bill Bixby	Arthur Alsberg & Don Nelson	William Robert Yates and Kevin Corcoran

Jim Douglas, a former racing driver, owns and runs a driving school, along with his sentient VW Beetle, Herbie. Jim stumbles upon an attempted bank robbery, and with Herbie's help rescues a hostage. Later, the driving school is closed down after Herbie interferes with a motor vehicle inspection. Jim begins a relationship with a divorcee named Susan MacLane. Together with her daughter and two sons, Jim and Susan begin to build a family unit, to the disdain and envy of her ex-boyfriend/fiancé Randy.

When the pair become engaged, Randy attempts to sabotage the relationship. Jim's ex-girlfriend shows up to his bachelor party, while Randy kidnaps Herbie and replaces him with a look-alike vehicle. After his plans to ruin the wedding are stopped, with the assistance of Herbie, Jim and Susan are married. Together, they sell her vehicle and purchase a family-sized station wagon. Herbie joyfully gains a larger family, with the new additions of Susan, Julie, Robbie, and Matthew.

==== Featured appearances ====
- In 1990, Herbie made an appearance in the second season of the 1980s/90s revival of The Mickey Mouse Club. The character appears briefly in a spoof skit titled, "Herbie the Love Can of Cream of Mushroom Soup".
- One of the versions of Herbie, that appeared in the Disney Parade, also briefly appears in the comedy skit titled "Clown College". The character is redesigned as a clown car for the routine.

=== Animation ===
- Herbie has a brief appearance in the House of Mouse season 2 episode titled "Max's New Car". The character appears with other Disney vehicles. Herbie encourages Max Goof to talk to his father about buying a car.
- Herbie has a brief cameo in The Simpsons season 11 episode titled "Beyond Blunderdome". Released in 1999, the character appears alongside various other famous vehicles in the Movie Car Museum. Though the appearance was originally produced by 20th Century Fox Television, through acquisition of 21st Century Fox by The Walt Disney Company in 2019, the cameo is currently distributed by the latter company's subsidiary, 20th Television.
- Herbie has a brief appearance in the American Dad! season 13 episode titled "Stan Smith as Keanu Reeves as Stanny Utah in Point Breakers". Released in 2016, the character helps Stan escape from a collaborative attack from poachers and wolves. Similar to The Simpsons, American Dad! was originally produced by Fox, before the company was purchased by The Walt Disney Company. The show is currently distributed by its parent-company, Disney.

== Main cast and characters ==
List indicators

This section includes characters who will appear or have appeared in the franchise in main roles.

- An empty grey cell indicates the character was not in the film, or that the character's official presence has not yet been confirmed.
- ^{Y} indicates a younger version of the character.

Character	Film series						Television series
Character	The Love Bug	Herbie Rides Again	Herbie Goes to Monte Carlo	Herbie Goes Bananas	The Love Bug	Herbie: Fully Loaded	Herbie, the Love Bug
Herbie	Appeared	Appeared	Appeared	Appeared	Appeared	Appeared	Appeared
Jim Douglas	Dean Jones		Dean Jones		Dean Jones		Dean Jones
Tennessee Steinmetz	Buddy Hackett						
Carole Bennet-Douglas	Michele Lee						
Peter Thorndyke	David Tomlinson						
Havershaw	Joe Flynn						
Mrs. "Grandma" Steinmetz		Helen Hayes					
Willoughby Whitfield		Ken Berry					
Nicole Harris-Whitefield		Stefanie Powers					
Alonzo Hawk		Keenan Wynn					
Wheely Applegate			Don Knotts				
Giselle			Appeared			Flashback	
Diane Darcy			Julie Sommars				
Bruno Von Stickle			Eric Braeden				
Claude Gilbert			Mike Kulcsar				
Inspector Bouchet			Jacques Marin				
Detective Fontenoy			Xavier Saint-Macary				
Pete Stancheck				Stephen W. Burns			
Davy "D.J." Johns				Charles Martin Smith			
Paco				Joaquin Garay III			
Melissa Trends				Elyssa Davalos			
Aunt Louise Trends				Cloris Leachman			
Prindle				John Vernon			
Quinn				Alex Rocco			
Shepard				Richard Jaeckel			
Hank Cooper					Bruce Campbell		
Roddy Martel					Kevin J. O'Connor		
Alex Davis					Alexandra Wentworth		
Horace					Appeared		
Simon Moore III					John Hannah		
Rupert					Dana Gould		
Dr. Gustav Stumpfel					Harold Gould		
Dr. Gustav Stumpfel					Peter Spears^{Y}		
Maggie Peyton						Lindsay Lohan	
Ray Peyton, Sr.						Michael Keaton	
Ray Peyton, Jr.						Breckin Meyer	
Kevin						Justin Long	
Trip Murphy						Matt Dillon	
Crash						Jimmi Simpson	
Susan MacLane-Douglas							Patricia Harty
Julie MacLane							Claudia Wells
Robbie MacLane							Douglas Emerson
Matthew MacLane							Nicky Katt
Bo Phillips							Richard Paul
Randy Bigelow							Larry Linville

== Additional crew and production details ==
Film	Crew/Detail					
Film	Composer(s)	Cinematographer(s)	Editor(s)	Production companies	Distributing company	Running time
The Love Bug	George Bruns	Edward Colman	Cotton Warburton	Walt Disney Productions	Buena Vista Distribution	1hr 48mins
Herbie Rides Again	George Bruns	Frank Phillips	Cotton Warburton	Walt Disney Productions	Buena Vista Distribution	1hr 28mins
Herbie Goes to Monte Carlo	Frank De Vol	Frank Phillips	Cotton Warburton	Walt Disney Productions	Buena Vista Distribution	1hr 44mins
Herbie Goes Bananas	Frank De Vol	Gordon D. Brenner	Leonard J. South	Walt Disney Productions	Buena Vista Distribution	1hr 38mins
Herbie, the Love Bug	Frank De Vol & Tom Worrall	Jack A. Whitman Jr. & Jack Swain	Gordon Brenner, Marsh Hendry & Ron Honthaner	Walt Disney Productions	Buena Vista Television, Columbia Broadcasting System	2hrs 40mins
The Love Bug	Shirley Walker	Russ Alsobrook	Chip Masamitsu	Walt Disney Television	Disney–ABC Domestic Television	1hr 28mins
Herbie: Fully Loaded	Mark Mothersbaugh	Greg Gardiner	Wendy Greene Bricmont	Walt Disney Pictures, Robert Simonds Productions	Buena Vista Pictures	1hr 40mins

== Reception ==
=== Box office performance ===
Film	Box office gross				Box office ranking		Ref.
Film	North America	Other territories	Worldwide	Adjusted for inflation	All-time North America	All-time worldwide	Ref.
The Love Bug	$51,264,000	Information unavailable	$51,264,000	$450,071,869	#1,733	#2,757	
Herbie Rides Again	$38,229,000	Information unavailable	$38,229,000	$249,571,913	#2,689	#3,778	
Herbie Goes to Monte Carlo	$29,000,000	Information unavailable	$29,000,000	$152,305,777	#2,944	#4,092	
Herbie Goes Bananas	$18,000,000	Information unavailable	$18,000,000	$69,969,068	#4,004	#5,426	
Herbie: Fully Loaded	$66,023,816	$78,123,000	$144,146,816	$237,624,884	#1,263	#1,225	
Totals	$201,516,816	$78,123,000	$279,639,816	$1,159,543,510			

=== Critical response ===
Film	Rotten Tomatoes	Metacritic
The Love Bug	76% (17 reviews)	48/100 (7 reviews)
Herbie Rides Again	80% (5 reviews)	49/100 (5 reviews)
Herbie Goes to Monte Carlo	60% (10 reviews)	38/100 (4 reviews)
Herbie Goes Bananas	40% (5 reviews)	55/100 (4 reviews)
Herbie, the Love Bug	—N/a	—N/a (0 reviews)
The Love Bug	—N/a (2 reviews)	—N/a
Herbie: Fully Loaded	40% (144 reviews)	47/100 (31 reviews)

Audience survey company CinemaScore polled opening weekend audiences for Herbie: Fully Loaded and they gave the film a grade "A" on scale of A to F. The other films in the series were not polled upon their release by CinemaScore.

== Related films ==
Keenan Wynn appears as the primary antagonist in Herbie Rides Again (1974), named Alonzo P. Hawk. Wynn previously portrayed the same character in The Absent-Minded Professor (1961) and Son of Flubber (1963). Hawk is a villainous, dishonest, and scheming businessman character in each respective film.

Film	U.S. release date	Director	Screenwriter(s)	Story by	Producer(s)
The Absent-Minded Professor	March 16, 1961	Robert Stevenson	Bill Walsh	Bill Walsh	Walt Disney
Son of Flubber	January 16, 1963	Robert Stevenson	Bill Walsh & Don DaGradi	Bill Walsh & Don DaGradi	Walt Disney

== In other media ==
=== Themepark events and attractions ===
- Love Bug Day: An event held at Disneyland to celebrate the financial successes of the first and second films, which took place on two separate days in 1969 and 1974.
  - March 23, 1969 – The event had two main parts. In the first portion park visitors met in the parking lot, where they presented their own custom decorated VW Beetles in a competition to win a new one. During the second part of the occasion, the vehicles paraded from Main Street, U.S.A. town square, to the It's a Small World ride. Dean Jones greeted the contestants, and awarded car keys to the winner.
  - June 30, 1974 – The second "Love Bug Day" followed a similar series of events, while this time Helen Hayes was the film star to welcome and award the guests. This second occurrence featured as a part of the aired "Herbie Day at Disneyland" television special.
- Disney's All-Star Movies Resort: After previously appearing in various Disney Park parades, including Disney on Parade at Hong Kong Disneyland, the character now features at a hotel in Walt Disney World. Herbie is featured prominently in the Love Bug-themed section of the resort called Winner's Circle.
- Lights, Motors, Action!: Extreme Stunt Show (2005–2011): Herbie featured during the half-time show at Disney theme parks from the time the attraction opened on May 25, 2005. In 2011 the sequence was replaced with Lightning McQueen. The show was later cancelled on April 2, 2016, and replaced by Star Wars: Galaxy's Edge.

=== Productions ===
- Disney on Parade (1969–1973): In 1968, the concept was conceived by Thomas Sarnoff and presented to his brother, Robert Sarnoff. Robert had served as President of National Broadcasting Company (NBC) and CEO of Radio Corporation of America (RCA), the prior of which was the network which had aired The Wonderful World of Disney. In developing the stage show, Walt Disney Productions worked with NBC to create a partnership subsidiary company called Nawal Productions. Four seasons of the show traveled, as separate editions. After the financial success of a trial run in Long Beach in 1969, the show evolved and thrived with the addition of producer/director Michel "Mr. G" Grilikhes. The first edition's run at Madison Square Garden made a record in advanced ticket sales with $400,000.00 total; while a run in Salt Lake City booked a total of 77,255 people in nine days (equivalent of 38% of the city's population). It later toured Europe, Australia, Asia and Latin America, earning $64 million worldwide. Herbie featured during the last three years, in the comedy acts:
  - "Goofy and the Love Bug" (1970–'71): The comedy comedic short, centered around Goofy working in an autobody shop, who comes into contact and contends with Herbie.
  - "Three's a Family" (1972–'73): Goofy once again meets Herbie. The plot featured the latter falling in love with a pink VW, and the pair have their own little Bug of their own.
  - "The Used Car Lot" (1973–'74). During the comedic skit, Goofy visits a used car lot and can't decide if he prefers a Ford Model T or Herbie.
- Walt Disney's World on Ice: In 1979, Mattel approached The Walt Disney Company to collaborate on an ice show centered around the latter's properties. The traveling show was developed by Irvin & Kenneth Feld Productions. The first series of shows debuted in 1981, while Herbie featured throughout the performances. The show eventually evolved into Disney on Ice, with Herbie featuring in various shows.
- Herbie and Friends Tour: In joint-commemoration of the 50th Anniversary of the franchise and Volkswagen Group of America, Walt Disney Pictures in collaboration with VW America sponsored a roadtrip tour, featuring Herbie and various classic VWs. The trek included 25 VW dealership stops, impromptu mini-car shows, as well as promotional stays for the Herbie Fully Loaded film. Starting in San Francisco, California and ended New York City, the event lasted from May 13–31, 2005.

=== Marketing ===
Herbie appears in Disneyland's 50th Anniversary television commercial, where he is driven by Mickey Mouse and Goofy as they take a roadtrip get to Disneyland.

=== Video games ===
- Disney's Herbie: Fully Loaded (2005): A racing game developed by Climax Handheld Games, published by Disney Interactive Studios and Buena Vista Games as a Game Boy Advance exclusive release. The game is based loosely based on the 2005 film Herbie: Fully Loaded and features stills from the movie as in-game cut scenes. The player takes the role of Herbie throughout a series of races, though should they fail to place first in any race, they are shown a Game Over screen and booted to the menu to start over. The game was met with mixed reception, while its 3D graphics were widely praised.
- Disney's Herbie: Rescue Rally (2007): A racing game developed by Climax Handheld games, and published by Disney Interactive Studios as a Nintendo DS exclusive release. The game is based on the Herbie film series. It earned a positive critical reception with IGN stating: "...Herbie Rescue Rally is a good game. For a system that is seriously lacking in solid racing titles, it's refreshing to find one that is at least worth playing."
