= Herbie Rescue Rally =

2007 video game

- Developer: Climax Handheld Games
- Publisher: Disney Interactive Studios
- Platform: Nintendo DS
- Release: NA: April 2, 2007; EU: June 21, 2007; AU: July 26, 2007
- Genre: Racing
- Modes: Single-player, multiplayer

Disney's Herbie Rescue Rally is a racing video game for the Nintendo DS, developed by Climax Handheld Games and published by Disney Interactive Studios. It is based on Disney's Herbie film series.

== Overview ==
Despite the game releasing two years after Disney's Herbie: Fully Loaded film and its tie-in videogame, Rescue Rally features a new plot with different characters. Herbie and Louise Noble must win back her family's animal sanctuary from Edward Vile by competing in a cross state race and winning one million dollars.

Similar to other racing videogames such as Mario Kart, the gameplay consists of driving into speedboosts and power-ups. The game contains four racetracks, a Story mode, as well as a Multiplayer mode via Multi-Card Play.

== Reception ==
IGN gave the game a 7.3/10, stating that "it feels weird to say that Herbie Rescue Rally is a good game. For a system that is seriously lacking in solid racing titles, it's refreshing to find one that is at least worth playing."
