= Susie the Little Blue Coupe =

1952 film by Clyde Geronimi

- Title card
- Directed by: Clyde Geronimi
- Story by: Bill Peet (story & adaptation); Don DaGradi (adaptation)
- Produced by: Walt Disney
- Starring: Stan Freberg; Clark Lagerstrom; Bob Jackman
- Narrated by: Sterling Holloway
- Music by: Paul J. Smith (Note: Not to be confused with the animator of the same name.)
- Animation by: Bob Carlson; Ollie Johnston; Hal King; Cliff Nordberg; George Rowley (effects)
- Layouts by: Hugh Hennesy; Don Griffith
- Backgrounds by: Ralph Hulett
- Production company: Walt Disney Productions
- Distributed by: RKO Radio Pictures
- Release date: June 6, 1952
- Running time: 7:36
- Country: United States
- Language: English

Susie the Little Blue Coupe is an animated short film produced by Walt Disney Productions and originally released by RKO Radio Pictures on June 6, 1952. The eight-minute film was directed by Clyde Geronimi and based on an original short-story by Bill Peet. The story was adapted for the screen by Peet and Don DaGradi.

== Plot ==
A screenshot of the titular character, Susie.

Susie is a small blue coupe on display in a dealer showroom. She eventually is bought by a well-to-do man who is instantly smitten with her. Thrust into high society, she finds herself surrounded by much larger, faster and more luxurious cars, but eventually makes do. Her owner treats the car well but neglects to maintain her, and after years of wear and tear, the car stops running properly; the man, informed by his mechanic that Susie will need a massive overhaul, abandons her for a new vehicle. At a used car lot, Susie is purchased again, but the new owner, a cigar-smoking drunk who lives in a seedier part of town, does not treat the car with the same fondness as the first owner and leaves her on the curbside at night.

One night, the coupe is stolen by a sinister stranger, chased by the police and crashed; presumed "dead", she is sent to a junkyard. Susie is sad and broken down, but she shows stirrings of life, even in her wrecked state. A young man notices and buys her at a bargain price. With the help of his friends, the young man completely restores and revives Susie as a brand new hot rod. An overjoyed and like-new Susie rides off.

== Home media ==
The DVD release of The Love Bug featured this short as a special feature. The Adventures of Ichabod and Mr. Toad DVD also features the short as a bonus episode on the DVD's trivia section.

It also appeared on the It's A Small World of Fun Vol. 2 DVD.

== Legacy ==
Susie made cameo appearances in the House of Mouse episode, "Max's New Car" and in the 2023 animated short film Once Upon a Studio.

The film's method of anthropomorphizing the cars, using the windshield for the eyes and eyelids, served as a stylistic inspiration for Disney and Pixar's Cars franchise.

== Copyright status ==
The full short (no audio).

While the animated film's copyright was not renewed, the music within it was. Effectively, this means that the film's images are public domain, but the short in full will not enter the public domain until 2048 under current United States copyright law.

== See also ==
- One Cab's Family - a 1952 Metro Goldwyn Mayer cartoon short similar in content
