= The Love Bug (1997 film) =

1997 television film directed by Peyton Reed

- VHS cover
- Genre: Adventure; Comedy
- Based on: The Love Bug by: Bill Walsh; Don DaGradi; Gordon Buford
- Teleplay by: Ryan Rowe
- Directed by: Peyton Reed
- Starring: Bruce Campbell; John Hannah; Alexandra Wentworth; Kevin J. O'Connor; Dana Gould; Harold Gould
- Music by: Shirley Walker
- Country of origin: United States
- Original language: English

Production
- Executive producers: George Zaloom; Les Mayfield
- Producers: Joan Van Horn; Irwin Marcus
- Cinematography: Russ Alsobrook
- Editor: Chip Masamitsu
- Running time: 88 minutes
- Production companies: Zaloom/Mayfield Productions; Walt Disney Television

Original release
- Network: ABC
- Release: November 30, 1997

Related
- Herbie Goes Bananas (1980); Herbie: Fully Loaded (2005)

The Love Bug is a 1997 American adventure comedy television film directed by Peyton Reed and written by Ryan Rowe. The fifth installment in the Herbie film series, the film is part remake and part sequel, in that the events of the original 1968 The Love Bug film are repeated while the storyline plots to follow Herbie Goes Bananas (1980). It premiered on ABC in the anthology television series The Wonderful World of Disney on November 30, 1997. The film stars Bruce Campbell and includes a special appearance by Dean Jones, star of the original The Love Bug, tying it to the previous films, while introducing an evil, black Volkswagen Beetle named Horace, the Hate Bug, giving the film a much darker tone than the other films.

The film marks the first appearance of Herbie in fifteen years, following the television series Herbie, the Love Bug (1982), which ran for five episodes.

The Love Bug was followed by the theatrically released Herbie: Fully Loaded (2005).

== Plot ==
The narrator, Jim Douglas, tells the story of Herbie the Volkswagen Beetle, and their adventures together. Cutting to the present-day, Herbie is now owned by an egotistic race car driver and car dealer named Simon Moore III, who does not treat Herbie very well. During a race, Simon insults and calls Herbie a piece of junk, which causes Herbie to rebel against him, and they end up in last place. Simon is not pleased, and throws out Herbie in a junkyard.

Meanwhile, Hank Cooper, himself an ex-racing driver and former rival of Moore's, now makes a living as a small-town mechanic who works in a local garage. His boss, Chuck, enters Hank into a junk-car race, where drivers select a jalopy and attempt to repair and race it. Hank ends up getting "last choice" and is forced to choose the only car left, the broken-down Herbie.

Assisted by his "spiritually enlightened" but goofy artist friend Roddy, Hank manages to get Herbie started just before he is towed off the track. In appreciation of Hank's kindness, Herbie manages to win the one-lap race, restoring Hank's confidence in his racing ability. The judges of the race – Donny Shotz, an auto customizer; Alex, an automotive journalist whom Hank used to date; and Moore himself – are astonished, and Alex challenges Hank to prove that he didn't use any tricks during the race. Hank takes Alex for a ride, showing off Herbie's speed, and their relationship is re-kindled – with Herbie driving them to an isolated area and locking his doors (as he did with Jim and Carole Bennett in the first movie).

Meanwhile, Roddy tells Hank that he believes Herbie is special, but Hank shows resentment toward Herbie, still bitter at the outcome of his failed racing career. Roddy takes Herbie to an automotive art show, where Alex and Hank continue talking about their relationship, and Herbie, much to Hank's annoyance. Simon also sees Herbie at the show and attempts to discover why the car that failed him took Hank to victory. He discovers that Herbie was built by a German engineer named Dr. Gustav Stumpfel shortly after World War II, where a photograph of his wife fell into the vat of metal used to create Herbie, giving him life.

Simon asks Dr. Stumpfel to repeat the process to build another car, resulting in the creation of another, black Volkswagen Beetle, using the "ingredients" of a picture of Simon, along with Herbie's stolen key. He names the car Horace, the Hate Bug — Herbie's evil counterpart.

Simon orders Horace to find Herbie and destroy him, which Horace does, leaving Herbie a heap of crushed metal. Hank, now convinced Herbie is alive after previously refusing to believe Roddy, catches up with Herbie, but is too late to save him. Hank, Roddy, and Alex give Herbie a funeral, where Jim Douglas arrives with Dr. Stumpfel. After examining Herbie's remains, Dr. Stumpfel informs them that he can be rebuilt, provided they use all of Herbie's original parts. Hank gets Donny Shotz to reshape and repaint Herbie's sheet metal while Hank, Roddy, Alex, and Jim all work together to rebuild Herbie.

Jim reminisces with Alex and Hank about his ownership of Herbie, including how he first met Carole, and Alex and Hank realize that Herbie was also doing the same thing for them. When they have finished, Hank gives Jim the honor of trying to start Herbie, which Jim accepts. Herbie starts on the first try and sounds his horn, assuring them he is still the same car they have come to know and love.

Meanwhile, Simon discovers that Herbie has been rebuilt, and challenges Hank to a one-on-one race between Horace and Herbie. Although Simon makes every attempt to sabotage the race, including the use of grenades, Herbie comes through to win even after being cut in half by Horace's laser beam. Furious, Horace tries to destroy Herbie again by ramming him off a cliff, but misses and ends up falling into a ravine, destroying himself. Simon and his partner Rupert are then arrested for illegally detonating explosives, driving an unregistered devil car and illegally dumping it.

The film ends with Hank and Alex driving off for a date in Herbie after finishing up on a magazine article and photoshoot about the little car.

== Cast ==
- Bruce Campbell as Hank Cooper
- John Hannah as Simon Moore III
- Alexandra Wentworth as Alex Davis
- Kevin J. O'Connor as Roddy Martel
- Dana Gould as Rupert
- Harold Gould as Dr. Gustav Stumpfel
- Micky Dolenz as Donny Shotz
- Dean Jones as Jim Douglas
- Clarence Williams III as Chuck
- Jeff Garlin as Highway Patrolman

== Home media ==
The film was released on VHS format throughout the United States and Canada. So far, it is the only film of the Herbie franchise to not be publicly released on DVD or Blu-Ray.
