= Beyond Blunderdome =

- The Simpsons episode
- Episode no.: Season 11; Episode 1
- Directed by: Steven Dean Moore
- Written by: Mike Scully
- Production code: AABF23
- Original air date: September 26, 1999

Guest appearances
- Mel Gibson as himself; Jack Burns as Edward Christian

Episode features
- Chalkboard gag: "Fridays are not 'pants optional'"
- Couch gag: The crudely drawn Simpsons family from the Tracey Ullman Show shorts are on the couch. The Simpsons (as they are currently drawn) come in. All ten of them scream and run away.
- Commentary: Mike Scully; Ian Maxtone-Graham; George Meyer; Ron Hauge; Matt Selman; Steven Dean Moore

Episode chronology
← Previous "Thirty Minutes over Tokyo"	Next → "Brother's Little Helper"
- The Simpsons season 11

"Beyond Blunderdome" is the eleventh season premiere of the American animated television series The Simpsons. It originally aired on the Fox Network in the United States on September 26, 1999 and was watched in around 8.1 million homes during the broadcast. In the episode, the Simpsons are given free tickets to a preview screening of Mel Gibson's new film, a remake of Mr. Smith Goes to Washington. Gibson laments his current non-violent role and wants someone to give him criticism. When Homer sees Gibson talking with Marge, he gives him a brutal review, leading Gibson to believe that Homer is the only man brave enough to give suggestions. As a result, he hires him to create a better ending. However, when the ending proves to be too controversial, Gibson and Homer end up on the run from studio executives with the film.

The episode was written by then-showrunner Mike Scully and directed by Steven Dean Moore. The story was a parody of the film industry and its practice with test screenings and overly violent films. It featured several references to various films as well as other popular culture. Gibson guest starred as himself, and Jack Burns voiced a film studio executive named Edward Christian. Since airing, the episode has received generally mixed reviews from critics, but Gibson was praised for his performance. It was released on the DVD collection The Simpsons Film Festival in 2002, and The Simpsons – The Complete Eleventh Season in 2008.

== Plot ==
Homer test drives (and destroys) a new electric car so that he can get a free gift, which turns out to be—to his disappointment—free tickets to a preview screening of the new Mel Gibson film, a remake of Mr. Smith Goes to Washington. Homer is also disconcerted to discover that Marge thinks Mel is very attractive. At the screening, which Gibson attends unannounced, the audience members are given comment cards to fill in. Homer, incensed by Mel's apparent flirting with Marge, makes the only critical comment; Gibson thinks Homer is the only person brave enough to tell the truth.

Gibson invites Homer and his family to come with him to Hollywood to improve the film. Homer and Gibson work together while the rest of the family explores Hollywood, but Homer's ideas are not useful, and Gibson begins to wonder whether he made a mistake. However, he is enthusiastic when Homer tells him his ideas for the famous "filibuster" scene at the end. The next day, they show the producers the new ending, in which Mr. Smith slaughters not only the President but also every member of the United States Congress in a mindless action movie sequence. The producers are horrified at this, saying that the film was meant to be the studio's prestige picture. They attempt to burn the new ending, but Homer and Gibson, determined to save their film, run away with it.

They meet up with the rest of the family at a car museum, where they steal a replica of the main villain's car from The Road Warrior and engage in a car chase through the streets of Hollywood, with the film executives on their trail. Homer, taking an idea he believes to be from Braveheart, moons the executives along with Gibson so that they will stop their car out of disgust. Homer and Gibson then attend the film's premiere in Springfield, but at the end the entire audience walks out disgusted, and Jimmy Stewart's granddaughter threatens to sue them. Homer then tries to apologize to Gibson, who does not blame him, concluding there is no place for violence-lovers like themselves in Hollywood; however, after Homer suggests too many more worthless film ideas, Gibson kicks him out of his limousine.

== Production and themes ==
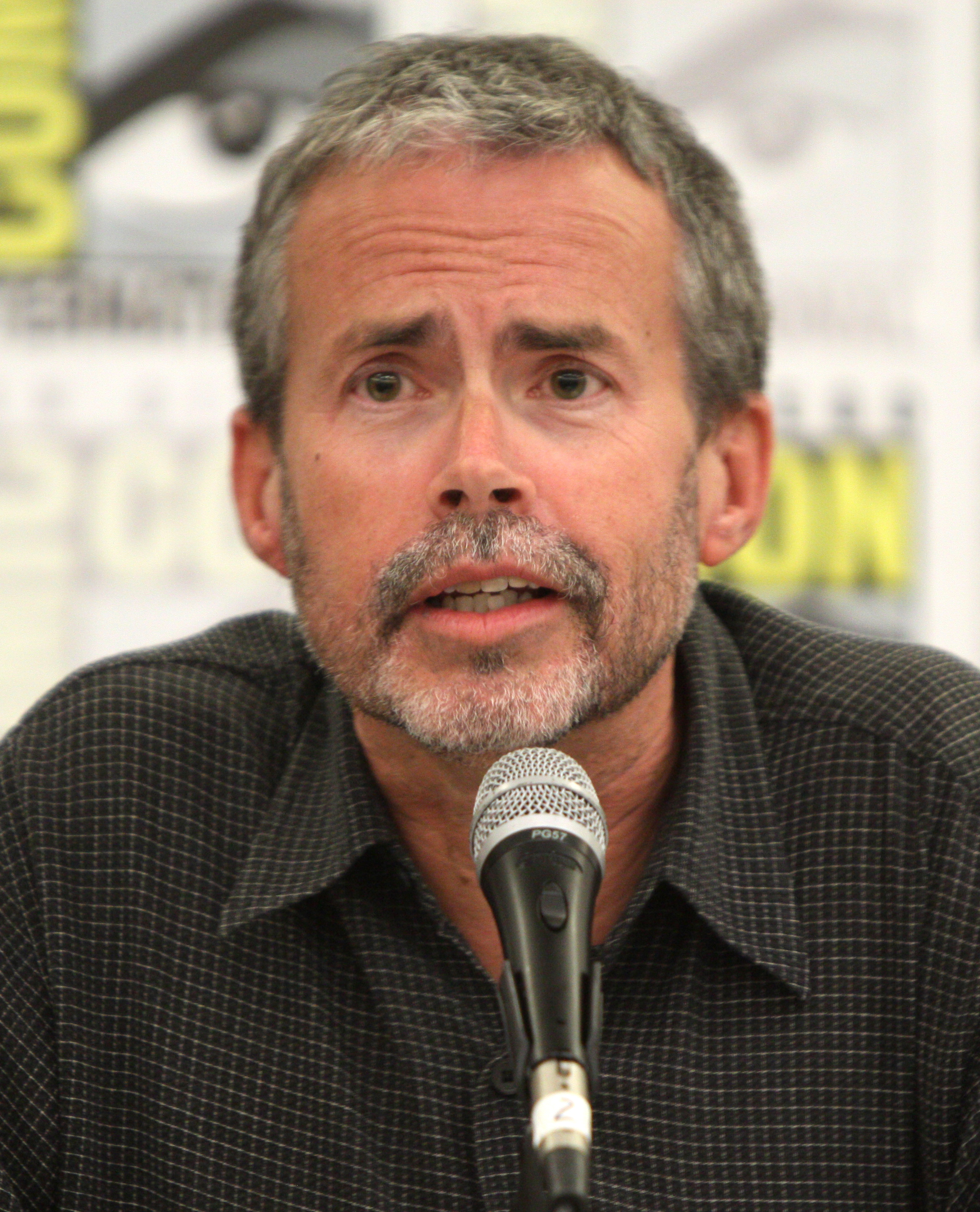
Mike Scully wrote the episode as well as being showrunner for the eleventh season of The Simpsons

"Beyond Blunderdome" was written by then-showrunner Mike Scully and directed by Steven Dean Moore, airing as part of the eleventh season of The Simpsons (1999–2000). It was Scully's first writing credit since he took over as showrunner for the show. In comparison with other episode scripts, the staff writers did not change much of the original writing. The plot revolves around Mel Gibson doing a remake of the 1939 film Mr. Smith Goes to Washington. Karma Waltonen and Denise Du Vernay analysed the episode and wrote in the book The Simpsons in the Classroom: Embiggening the Learning Experience with the Wisdom of Springfield that "the episode is able to critique the practice of test screening, violence in film, and one of movies' favorite standards – the car chase", calling it "a ridiculous parody of an action-film violence orgy". Staff writer Tom Gammill came up with the idea for the violent version of Mr. Smith Goes to Washington, and Gibson throwing his Senator badge away at the end of the film, is a reference to the ending of the film Dirty Harry from 1971. The idea for the set piece with electric cars at the beginning of the episode came from Kevin Nealon, who was a friend of former showrunner David Mirkin. One day, he came by and demonstrated his electric car for the writing staff.

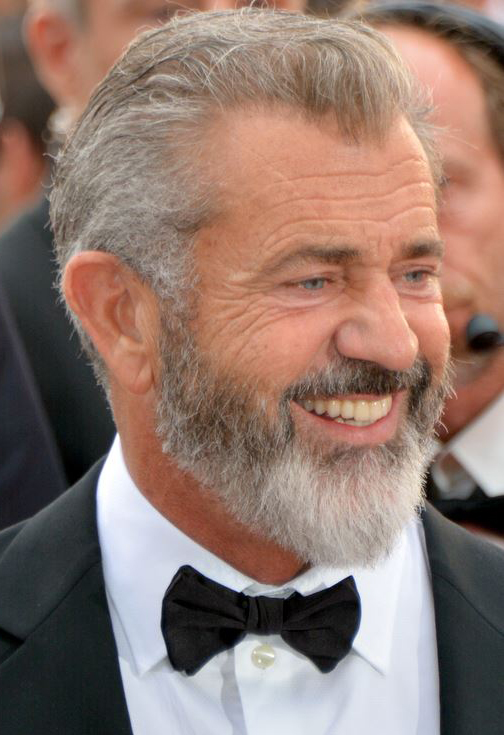
Mel Gibson appeared as himself in the episode

The episode featured Mel Gibson as a guest voice. Scully had previously met him while writing jokes for a school fundraiser along with his wife Julie Thacker. Gibson and Daniel Stern were the hosts and needed jokes for the event. It turned out that Gibson was a fan of the show and watched it with his children. With that knowledge, it did not take Scully long to invite him to do a part. Gibson was willing to do the job and even came in on three separate occasions to do retakes – mostly because he knew his children would be watching. Unlike most guest voices, Gibson recorded the show along with the cast. On one occasion, it turned out that a joke written for Gibson actually did happen in real life. The writing staff wanted Gibson to say that he would urinate behind a dumpster, because it sounded like it would not be a classy thing to do for a movie star. He had, however, already done that during a couple of film premieres because he can feel trapped in a public toilet with a lot of fans. Gibson was surprised the writers knew about the story, but it turned out to be a coincidence. Otherwise, the episode frequently references films Gibson appeared in. After the studio cart crashes, Gibson says to Homer, "I'm getting too old for this crap," a reference to a line said by Danny Glover's character Roger Murtaugh to Gibson's character Martin Riggs in the Lethal Weapon film series. A poster for his film Braveheart is on the wall in the editing room and the Road Warrior car from the 1981 film Mad Max 2 is also featured. In addition to Gibson, Jack Burns guest starred in the episode, voicing a film studio executive named Edward Christian. His frequent use of the terms "Huh?" and "You know what I mean?" is a reference to a comedy routine performed by Burns and Avery Schreiber. The episode also features John Travolta, in whose private jet Gibson flies to Springfield, but his voice was imitated by Dan Castellaneta.

== Cultural references ==
The Elec-Taurus car used the name of the Ford Taurus though its design and concept is more similar to the General Motors EV1 an electric car that was leased by General Motors between 1996 and 1999 in select U.S. markets.

In the episode, there are many references to popular culture. The title to the episode is a reference to the film Mad Max Beyond Thunderdome. The character Rainier Wolfcastle is seen filming Saving Irene Ryan, which is a reference to the 1998 film Saving Private Ryan, with The Beverly Hillbillies actress Irene Ryan. Homer says, "You had me at 'hello'," a quote from the film Jerry Maguire (1996), when Gibson asks for his help on his film. The airport is called "George Kennedy Airport", which is a reference to actor George Kennedy, and his role in the film Airport (1970) and its three sequels; Airport 1975 (1974), Airport '77 (1977) and The Concorde ... Airport '79 (1979).

When Homer asked Gibson to drive, He said to him. "I'm tired of running away. Did Braveheart run away? Did Payback run away? Did Ransom run away? It's time we showed those suits what we're made of."

When Homer and Gibson are being hunted by the executives they enter a car museum. The museum features the Batmobile from the television series Batman, General Lee from the series The Dukes of Hazzard, Herbie the Love Bug from the 1968 film The Love Bug and later films, the Monkeemobile from the series The Monkees, the Munster Koach from the series The Munsters, and the car from the series The Flintstones.

At one point, Marge notices Robert Downey Jr. shooting at the police and thinking he's filming a new action movie before Bart points out that he doesn't see any cameras, alluding to how, at the time the episode was made, Downey was repeatedly in trouble with the law. Both Nine Months and the Brown Derby were alluded to during the tour. Anne Heche and Ellen DeGeneres also make a cameo, where they declared their lesbianism, alluding to DeGeneres coming out a few years earlier. Marge also briefly expresses disgust when the tour guide mentions an infamous spot involving Hugh Grant prior to her making clear she's referring to the filming of Nine Months, indirectly referencing Grant's scandal involving Divine Brown at Sunset Boulevard.

== Release and reception ==
The episode originally aired on the Fox network in the United States on September 26, 1999, as the premiere of the eleventh season of The Simpsons. In its original broadcast, "Beyond Blunderdome" finished 48th in the ratings for the week of September 20–26, 1999, with a Nielsen rating of 8.0—equivalent to approximately 8.1 million viewing households. It was the highest-rated show on the Fox network that week, beating shows such as Futurama and King of the Hill. In comparison, the previous season premiere episode, "Lard of the Dance", drew a Nielsen rating of 7.2 points with 7.1 million households watching. The episode had a lower rating than the overall rating for the entire eleventh season, which averaged 8.2 million households. On March 12, 2002, the episode was released in the United States on a DVD collection titled The Simpsons Film Festival, along with the episodes "Itchy & Scratchy: The Movie" (season four), "22 Short Films About Springfield" season seven) and "A Star Is Burns" (season six). On October 7, 2008, "Beyond Blunderdome" was released on DVD as part of the box set The Simpsons – The Complete Eleventh Season. Staff members Scully, George Meyer, Ron Hauge, Matt Selman and Moore participated in the DVD audio commentary. The episode had an alternate ending in which Apu suggests that they sell the failed film to India, since the people of India love violent, action-packed American films. This ending was included on the eleventh season DVD set.

Since airing, the episode has received generally mixed reception from critics. The day after the premiere, Mark Lorando of The Times-Picayune wrote that while it was "not the laugh riot The Simpsons have spoiled us to expect – our appetite for showbiz parodies is waning – the episode did have its moments." He further added that he especially liked "the sign posted outside the movie studio gate: 'No Artistic Integrity Beyond This Point.'" While reviewing the eleventh season of The Simpsons, DVD Movie Guide's Colin Jacobson commented on the episode, writing that "Gibson actually does a good job here, and it’s amusing to see Homer’s terrible movie ideas. This isn’t classic Simpsons, but it starts the season on a pretty good note." However, an article in Salon magazine from 2000 points to "Beyond Blunderdome" as the greatest precursor to that Homer would be more predominant as "Jerkass Homer" in the Scully era as showrunner, a Homer who "is not only dumb, but [has also become] disgusting and semi-sociopathic. This is the Homer who, in the season opener ['Beyond Blunderdome'], showed Marge's wedding ring to Mel Gibson and stated, 'This is a symbol that as per our marriage, she's my property and I own her.'" Gibson's performance has generally been praised. Simon Crerar of The Times listed his performance as one of the thirty-three funniest cameos in the history of the show. Similarly, Total Film's Nathan Ditum ranked Gibson's performance as the seventh best guest appearance in the show's history in a list of twenty people, calling it "Another ace self-effacing appearance from a Hollywood high-flyer".

Ford reportedly pulled advertising from the premiere of the episode yet did not give a reason as to why they did so. The ad instead aired during that night's episode of King of the Hill.
