= Kellison =

Kellison is a surname. It may refer to the following notable people:

- Daniel Kellison (born 1964), American television and film producer
- James Frank "Jim" Kellison (November 23, 1932), American car manufacturer (Kellison, Kelmark Engineering, Stallion)
- John Kellison (1886–1971), American football player, athletic director, and college sports coach
- Matthew Kellison (c. 1560–1642), English Roman Catholic theologian and controversialist
