= The Love Bug =

1968 film directed by Robert Stevenson

- Theatrical release poster
- Directed by: Robert Stevenson
- Screenplay by: Bill Walsh; Don DaGradi
- Based on: "Car, Boy, Girl" by Gordon Buford
- Produced by: Bill Walsh
- Starring: Dean Jones; Michele Lee; David Tomlinson; Buddy Hackett
- Cinematography: Edward Colman
- Edited by: Cotton Warburton
- Music by: George Bruns
- Production company: Walt Disney Productions
- Distributed by: Buena Vista Distribution
- Release dates: December 24, 1968 (limited); March 13, 1969 (wide)
- Running time: 108 minutes
- Country: United States
- Language: English
- Budget: $5 million
- Box office: $51.2 million

The Love Bug is a 1968 American sports adventure comedy film directed by Robert Stevenson from a screenplay by Bill Walsh and Don DaGradi, based on the story "Car, Boy, Girl" by Gordon Buford. It is the first installment in the Herbie film series.

The film follows the adventures of a sentient Volkswagen Beetle named Herbie, Herbie's driver, Jim Douglas (Dean Jones), and Jim's love interest, mechanic Carole Bennett (Michele Lee). It also features Buddy Hackett as Jim's enlightened, kind-hearted friend, Tennessee Steinmetz, who creates "art" from used car parts. English actor David Tomlinson portrays the villainous Peter Thorndyke, the owner of an automobile showroom and an SCCA national champion who sells Herbie to Jim and eventually becomes his racing rival.

The Love Bug was originally given a limited release on December 24, 1968, and was later widely released on March 13, 1969 by Walt Disney Productions. It received positive reviews from critics, and received $51.2 million against a budget of $5 million. The film was followed by a sequel titled Herbie Rides Again (1974).

== Plot ==
Dean Jones in The Love Bug

Jim Douglas, once a prominent race car driver, is now relegated to participating in demolition derbies. Residing in a converted firehouse overlooking San Francisco Bay, Jim lives with his friend Tennessee Steinmetz, an eccentric mechanic and sculptor whose artistic creations repurpose discarded automobile components.

Jim’s fortunes shift when he visits a European car dealership, where he encounters Carole Bennett, a mechanic and sales associate, as well as Peter Thorndyke, the British proprietor of the establishment. During this visit, Jim notices a peculiar Volkswagen Beetle—a vehicle Thorndyke openly abuses after it is returned to the showroom under mysterious circumstances. Lacking the financial means to procure a vehicle, Jim departs, only to find that the Beetle follows him home. This leads to a police intervention on charges of grand theft, forcing Jim to reluctantly agree to a lease-purchase arrangement for the car.

Initially, Jim is frustrated with the Beetle, whose idiosyncratic behaviour includes avoiding highways and orchestrating encounters with Carole, suspecting Thorndyke of duping him with a malfunctioning vehicle. Tennessee discerns that the car possesses sentience although Jim sceptically dismisses Tennessee's claims. Endearing himself to the Beetle, Tennessee christens the car "Herbie".

Jim decides to enter Herbie into racing, giving the car racing stripes and adding the number '53'. In their debut race, Herbie delivers an unexpected victory, much to Thorndyke's surprise and Carole's delight. Thorndyke then offers to clear the payments in exchange to sell Herbie back to him. Jim is forced to compete directly with Thorndyke at Riverside, Herbie scores another impressive victory, overtaking his rival at the finish line. Jim, Tennessee, and Herbie becoming the talk of the California racing circuit, while once-champion Thorndyke suffers increasingly humiliating defeats. Desperate to discover the secret of Herbie's success, Thorndyke, on the eve of another important race, convinces Carole to take Jim for a ride in the best car in the showroom (an Apollo GT), then sneaks into his rival's house, gets Tennessee drunk on his own Irish coffee, and sabotages Herbie's performance in the race by pouring it into Herbie's gas tank. Disillusioned, Jim decides to replace Herbie with a new Lamborghini, a decision that alienates Carole who had just quit her promising job alongside Thorndyke (learning of his sabotage scheme), and Tennessee.

Feeling betrayed, Herbie reacts by vandalizing the Lamborghini and fleeing. After narrowly escaping being torn apart in Thorndyke's workshop, his escapades culminate in an attempt to throw himself from the Golden Gate Bridge, prompting Jim to intervene. At the police station, Tang Wu, a racing enthusiast and local businessman whose property Herbie also damaged, agrees to an offer from Jim to drop charges in exchange for ownership of Herbie on condition that Jim and Tennessee may race Herbie in the prestigious El Dorado Road race, with the agreement that if Jim wins the race, Mr. Wu will sell Herbie back to him for one dollar.

The El Dorado race, a two-day event traversing the Sierra Nevada, becomes the stage for Thorndyke's underhanded tactics. Despite these obstacles, Jim, Carole, and Tennessee persevere, although the first leg of the race leaves Herbie in a battered state, limping across the finish line using a makeshift wagon wheel. Overnight, Herbie refuses to start, and Jim admits to Mr. Wu that Herbie is in no condition to continue the race. Thorndyke suddenly appears, revealing that he made a separate bet with Mr. Wu that should Herbie drop out of the race, Thorndyke would take possession of Herbie and have him crushed. After Thorndyke assaults Jim, Herbie restarts, chasing Thorndyke away.

On the second leg, Herbie overcomes numerous challenges to close the gap on Thorndyke and take the lead heading into the final stages of the race. As they near the finish line, Herbie splits in two due to mechanical strain, his rear half, carrying Tennessee and the engine, crossing the finish line first, while his front half, with Jim and Carole aboard, follows closely, securing both first and third place.

Wu assumes control of Thorndyke's dealership, appoints Tennessee as his assistant, and relegates Thorndyke to the mechanics' workshop alongside his accomplice Havershaw. Rebuilt, Herbie serves as the wedding vehicle for Jim and Carole's departure, whisking the newlyweds away on their honeymoon.

== Cast ==
- Dean Jones as James "Jim" Douglas, a racing driver and Herbie's owner
- Michele Lee as Carole Bennett, a mechanic and Jim's love interest and wife at the end of the movie
- David Tomlinson as Peter Thorndyke, the evil owner of the car shop
- Buddy Hackett as Tennessee Steinmetz, Jim's friend and roommate
- Joe Flynn as Havershaw, Thorndyke's right-hand man
- Benson Fong as Tang Wu, Jim's friend and team supporter
- Joe E. Ross as Detective
- Barry Kelley as Police Sergeant
- Iris Adrian as Carhop
- Gary Owens as Announcer
- Chick Hearn as Announcer
- Andy Granatelli as Association President
- Ned Glass as Toll Booth Attendant
- Robert Foulk as Bice
- Gil Lamb as Policeman at Park
- Nicole Jaffe as Girl in Dune-Buggy
- Wally Boag as Flabbergasted Driver
- Peter Renaday as Policeman on Bridge
- Pedro Gonzalez Gonzalez as Mexican Driver
- Dale Van Sickel as Driver
- Fred Stromsoe as Driver
- Herbie as Himself, Jim's VW beetle sentient racing car

== Production notes ==
=== Story and development ===
Dean Jones credited the film's success to the fact that it was the last live-action film produced by Walt Disney Productions under Walt Disney's involvement, released just two years after his death in 1966. Although Jones tried to pitch him a serious, straightforward film project concerning the story of the first sports car ever brought to the United States, Walt suggested a different car story for him, which was "Car, Boy, Girl", a story written in 1961 by Gordon Buford.

Car, Boy, Girl; The Magic Volksy; The Runaway Wagen; Beetlebomb; Wonderbeetle; Bugboom and Thunderbug were among the original development titles considered for the film before the title was finalized as The Love Bug.

Herbie competes in the Monterey Grand Prix, which, except for 1963, was not a sports car race. The actual sports car race held at Monterey was the Monterey Sports Car Championships. The 1968 Monterey Grand Prix was in fact a Can Am Series race and did not feature production cars.

Peter Thorndyke's yellow "Special" is actually a 1965 Apollo GT, a rare sports car sold by International Motorcars of Oakland, California. It used an Italian-built body and chassis from Intermeccanica paired with a small-block Buick V8 engine that was installed in Oakland. This car exists today, is in the hands of a private collector, and has been restored as it was seen in the film with its yellow paint and number 14 logo.

=== "Herbie" ===
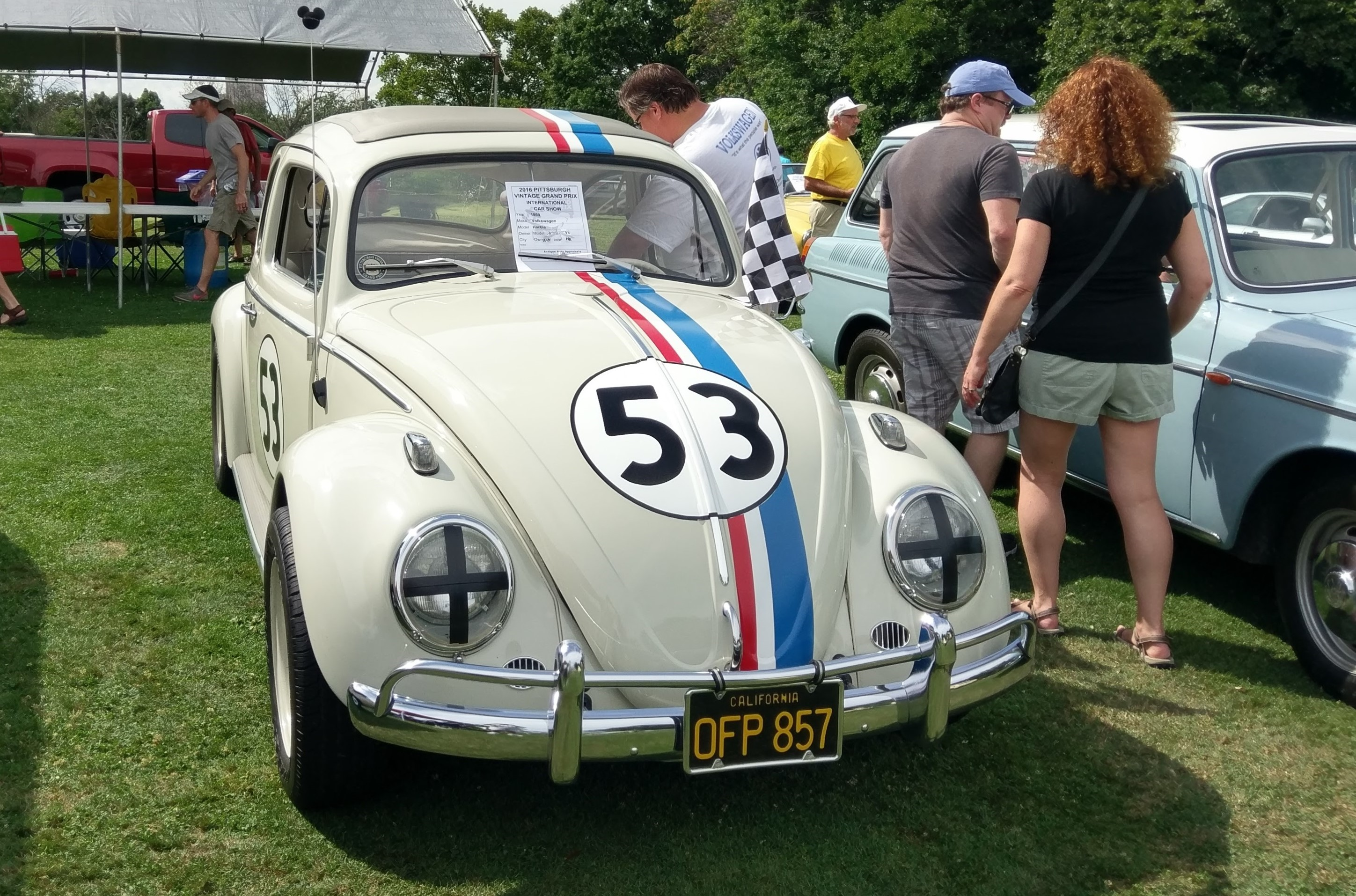
One of the original cars used during the filming of The Love Bug

Before the film entered production, the titular car was not specified as a Volkswagen Beetle, and Disney set up a casting call for a dozen cars to audition. In the lineup, there were a few Toyotas, a TVR, a handful of Volvos, an MG and a pearl white Volkswagen Beetle. The Volkswagen Beetle was chosen as it was the only one that elicited the crew to reach out and pet it.

The Volkswagen brand name, logo or shield does not feature anywhere in the film, as the automaker did not permit Disney to use the name. The only logos can be briefly seen in at least two places, however. The first instance is on the brake pedals during the first scene where Herbie takes control with Jim inside (on the freeway when Herbie runs into Thorndyke's Rolls-Royce), and it is shown in all the future scenes when Jim is braking. The second instance is on the ignition key, when Jim tries to shut down the braking Herbie. The subsequent films, however, do promote the Volkswagen name (as sales of the Beetle were down when the sequels were produced). The VW "Wolfsburg" castle emblem on the steering wheel hub is also seen throughout the car's interior shots. Within the script, the car was only ever referred to as "Herbie", "the little car" or "the Bug"—the latter, although a common nickname for the Beetle, was not trademarked by Volkswagen at the time of filming. Volkswagen was nervous of many of the scenes that showed Herbie apparently falling apart or malfunctioning - and thus carefully scrutinized the script of the film ensuring that it did not show the car in a negative light - allegedly sending teams of lawyers to the Disney studios on a regular basis to oversee the production.

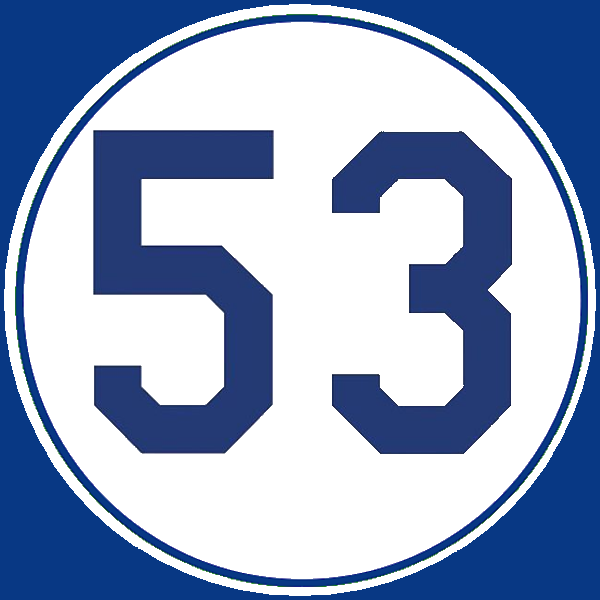
Donald Drysdale's number 53 was retired by the Los Angeles Dodgers in 1984.

The car was later given the name "Herbie" from one of Buddy Hackett's skits about a ski instructor named Klaus, who speaks with a German accent as he introduces his fellow ski instructors, who are named Hans, Fritz, Wilhelm, and Sandor. At the end of the skit, Hackett would say "If you ain't got a Herbie (pronounced "hoy-bee"), I ain't going."

Herbie's trademark "53" racing number was chosen by producer Bill Walsh, who was a fan of Los Angeles Dodgers baseball player Don Drysdale (Drysdale's jersey number, later retired by the team, was 53).

Walsh also gave Herbie his trademark red, white and blue racing stripes presumably for the more patriotic color and came up with the film's gags such as Herbie squirting oil and opening the doors by himself.

Benson Fong, who played Mr. Wu, said that when he and the others were dragged along the dirt by Herbie, it was like being pulled by 40 horses. The 1961–1965 Volkswagen Beetles actually were rated by the SAE at 40 horsepower (30 kW) in factory configuration (though only 34 horsepower (25 kW) by the European DIN system which measured engine output as installed in the car with cooling fan and exhaust system attached).

Herbie has his own cast billing in the closing credits, the only time this was done in the entire series of films.

Today, only a handful of the original Herbie cars are known to exist. Car #10 was recovered from a warehouse in Pennsylvania and has been preserved—still sporting its original paint from the film.

=== Deleted scenes ===
The bonuses on the DVD provide two deleted scenes named "Used Car Lot" and "Playground".

A scene shot but not included in the final cut of the film, featured Jim calling at a used car lot prior to his visiting Thorndyke's auto showroom. This missing sequence has long since been lost, and all that remains is the script and a single black and white photograph of Jim talking with the salesman at the lot.

An unfilmed scene at the end of the story that was scripted and storyboarded was to have shown Herbie playing with children at a nearby playground prior to taking the newly married Jim and Carole off on their honeymoon.

=== Stock footage ===
The opening scene of the demolition derby cars is stock footage from the film Fireball 500 (1966). Parts of this scene can also be found in a 1966-model year dealer promotional film by Chevrolet, titled Impact '66.

=== Shooting locations ===
Some of the racetrack scenes were shot at the Riverside International Raceway in Riverside, California. Others were filmed at Laguna Seca Raceway in Monterey, California, Willow Springs Raceway in Willow Springs, California and Paramount Ranch in Agoura Hills, California. Additional scenes depicting the El Dorado race were filmed near the San Bernardino Mountains in Big Bear City, California.

=== Cast and crew ===
Andy Granatelli, who was popular at the time as a presence at the Indianapolis 500 as well as the spokesman for STP, appears as himself as the racing association president. Announcer Gary Owens (of Rowan & Martin's Laugh-In fame) and Los Angeles Lakers play-by-play man Chick Hearn also appear as themselves.

The driving scenes were choreographed by veteran stunt man Carey Loftin. Drivers in the film billed in the opening credits include Dale Van Sickel, Reg Parton, Regina Parton, Tom Bamford, Bob Drake, Marion J. Playan, Hall Brock, Bill Hickman, Rex Ramsay, Hal Grist, Lynn Grate, Larry Schmitz, Richard Warlock, Dana Derfus, Everett Creach, Gerald Jann, Bill Couch, Ted Duncan, Robert Hoys, Gene Roscoe, Jack Mahoney, Charles Willis, Richard Brill, Roy Butterfield, Rudy Doucette, J.J. Wilson, Jim McCullough, Bud Ekins, Glenn Wilder, Gene Curtis, Robert James, John Timanus, Bob Harris, Fred Krone, Richard Ceary, Jesse Wayne, Jack Perkins, Fred Stromsoe, Ronnie Rondell, and Kim Brewer.

=== Cars featured ===
- 1956 Ferrari 250 GT Berlinetta (#14)
- 1955 OSCA MT4 Barchetta (#18)
- 1957 Chevrolet Two-Ten 2-Door Sedan (#23)
- 1959 Devin D (#47)
- 1959 Austin-Healey 3000 (#64)
- 195x Kellison J4 (#82)
- 1960 Ferrari 250 GT Berlinetta SWB (#54)
- 1963 Apollo 3500 GT (#14 "Thorndyke Special")
- 1963 Shelby Cobra 289 (#20)
- 1963 Triumph Spitfire 4 (#96)
- 1964 Jaguar XK-E (#14)
- 1965 Chevrolet Corvette Sting Ray C2 (#29)
- 1961 Balchowsky Ol' Yaller MkIV (#41)
- 1966 Lamborghini 400 GT 2+2
- 1966 Chevrolet Corvette Sting Ray C2 (#20)
- 1960 Sunbeam Alpine (#67)

=== Promotion ===
During one scene in the film, Herbie has lost one of his wheels, and Tennessee is hanging out of the passenger side door to balance him. The door opens, and there is no "53" logo on the door. This image was used heavily to promote the film.

== Reception ==
The Love Bug was the second highest-grossing film of 1969, earning over $51.2 million at the domestic box office. It received mostly positive reviews from critics, later earning a 78% "Fresh" rating from 18 critics on the review aggregator website Rotten Tomatoes. On Metacritic, the film has a weighted average score of 48 out to 100, based on 7 critics, indicating "mixed or average reviews".

Vincent Canby of The New York Times panned the film as "a long, sentimental Volkswagen commercial... which has the form of fantasy-comedy, lots of not-very-special effects and no real humor."

Variety wrote, "For sheer inventiveness of situation and the charm that such an idea projects, 'The Love Bug' rates as one of the better entries of the Disney organization."

Charles Champlin of the Los Angeles Times called it

brisk, active, bright, technically impeccable, simple-minded, full of tricky effects and free of all but the most glancing resemblances to nasty old reality. It is a formula picture, and such troubles as there are arise mainly from the fact that the formula has known much stronger ingredients (Fred MacMurray and flubber, let's say) in the past.

The Monthly Film Bulletin declared that "this very engaging mechanical fantasy is the best piece of work from the Disney studios for some time. The caper appears to have had the effect of injecting life into Robert Stevenson's usually pedestrian style, since with the exception of one glutinously sentimental episode the pace never lets up."

== Comic book adaptation ==
- Gold Key: The Love Bug (June 1969)

== Legacy ==
Four theatrical sequels followed: Herbie Rides Again (1974), Herbie Goes to Monte Carlo (1977), Herbie Goes Bananas (1980), and Herbie: Fully Loaded (2005). Some parts of the racing sequences from the film were later reused for Herbie's dream sequence in Herbie Rides Again, responding to Mrs. Steinmetz's telling Willoughby Whitfield that Herbie used to be a famous race car.

A five-episode television series, titled Herbie, the Love Bug, aired on CBS in the United States in 1982. Directed by Vincent McEveety, the series acted as a continuation of the films, with Dean Jones reprising his role as Jim Douglas. In 1997, there was a made-for-television sequel which included a Dean Jones cameo, tying it to the previous films. The most recent sequel, Herbie: Fully Loaded, was released on June 22, 2005, by Walt Disney Pictures.

At Disney's All-Star Movies Resort at Walt Disney World in Orlando, Florida, Herbie has been immortalized in the "Love Bug" buildings 6 and 7.

== Home media ==
The film was released on VHS on March 4, 1980. It was re-released on November 6, 1985, September 11, 1991, and on October 28, 1994, with Herbie Rides Again. It was soon re-released again on September 16, 1997, along with the entire Herbie the Love Bug film series. It was released on DVD for the first time on May 20, 2003. It was released again with its sequels in a four-movie collection in 2012. A 45th Anniversary Edition Blu-ray Disc was released on December 16, 2014, as a Disney Movie Club exclusive title.

== See also ==
- Superbug (1971–1978)—a knockoff series of West German films also about a sentient Volkswagen Beetle named Dudu.
- Christine (1983)—a later supernatural horror film about an anthropomorphic autumn-red, hardtop 1958 Plymouth Fury named Christine.
