= Herbie Rides Again =

1974 film directed by Robert Stevenson

- Theatrical release poster
- Directed by: Robert Stevenson
- Screenplay by: Bill Walsh
- Based on: Story by Gordon Buford
- Produced by: Bill Walsh
- Starring: Helen Hayes; Ken Berry; Stefanie Powers; Keenan Wynn; John McIntire
- Cinematography: Frank V. Phillips
- Edited by: Cotton Warburton
- Music by: George Bruns
- Production company: Walt Disney Productions
- Distributed by: Buena Vista Distribution
- Release dates: February 11, 1974 (London); June 6, 1974 (United States)
- Running time: 88 minutes
- Country: United States
- Language: English
- Box office: $38.2 million (US/Canada gross) $30.8 million (worldwide rentals)

Herbie Rides Again is a 1974 American comedy film directed by Robert Stevenson from a screenplay by Bill Walsh, based on a story by Gordon Buford. The film is the second installment in the Herbie film series and the sequel to The Love Bug (1968). It stars Helen Hayes, Stefanie Powers, Ken Berry, and Keenan Wynn reprising his villainous role as Alonzo Hawk (originated in the films The Absent-Minded Professor and Son of Flubber). The film's plot focuses on a now-retired Herbie, a sentient Volkswagen Beetle race car, helping his current custodian Mrs. Steinmetz (Hayes) to defeat a ruthless property developer who wants to demolish her home.

Herbie Rides Again received mixed to positive reviews from critics and earned $38.2 million in the US and Canada. It was followed by a second sequel titled Herbie Goes to Monte Carlo (1977).

== Plot ==
Notorious real estate magnate and demolition baron Alonzo A. Hawk is ready to build his newest office building, the 130-story Hawk Plaza in San Francisco. The only building remaining on the site is an 1892 firehouse inhabited by Mrs. Steinmetz, widow of its former owner, Fire Captain Steinmetz, and aunt of mechanic Tennessee Steinmetz. Hawk's numerous attempts at evicting Mrs. Steinmetz have been unsuccessful, and his workers are growing impatient. Hawk sends his lawyer nephew Willoughby Whitfield to Mrs. Steinmetz.

Mrs. Steinmetz takes a liking to Willoughby, and introduces him to Herbie, as well as sentient retired cable car Old No. 22 and an unnamed sentient orchestrion. Her granddaughter Nicole, who was taken in by Mrs. Steinmetz after her apartment was demolished by Hawk, punches Willoughby when she learns that he works for Hawk, but tries to make it up to him with a ride in Herbie. However, Herbie goes berserk after Willoughby insults him, taking the two to a car version of a joust tournament, which Herbie wins, and convinces Willoughby of Herbie's sentience.

Later at a restaurant on Fisherman's Wharf, Nicole shocks Willoughby by telling him all the horrible things Hawk has done. Upset, Willoughby accidentally reveals that Hawk is his uncle; an enraged Nicole hits him into the water with a lobster in response. Willoughby then reconciles with Herbie and decides to cut ties with Hawk, tries to go home in disguise, but Nicole convinces him to stay, having overheard him criticize his uncle on a payphone.

Meanwhile, Hawk decides to drive Mrs. Steinmetz out himself, starting with stealing Herbie. Hawk manages to hotwire Herbie, but Herbie retaliates by causing a series of traffic collisions and discarding Hawk at his office. Later, when Herbie takes Mrs. Steinmetz to market, they are chased by Hawk's men; Herbie makes several daring escapes, with Mrs. Steinmetz oblivious throughout.

Mrs. Steinmetz suggests to Herbie that he drive Nicole and Willoughby to the beach. Willoughby and Nicole enjoy a romantic moment at the beach, but Hawk's chauffeur bribes a man to block the only road out, prompting Herbie to surf through the bay to find an alternate route.

When they return to the firehouse after dark, every item of furniture has been removed by Hawk. The group tracks the theft to Hawk's warehouse, where they break in and recover Mrs. Steinmetz's belongings, loaded into Old No. 22. On the way home, Herbie and Old No. 22 are pursued by Hawk, and Mrs. Steinmetz meets and becomes enamored with an inebriated old-timer named Judson, who resembles her late husband.

The next morning, Mrs. Steinmetz decides to confront Hawk herself. Accompanied by Willoughby, Mrs. Steinmetz drives Herbie onto the window cleaning machine of Hawk's skyscraper to reach his office, where they overhear Hawk on the phone with demolition agent Loostgarten discussing a deal to demolish the firehouse. In response, she activates the window cleaning machine, filling the office with soap and water. Herbie chases Hawk around the office, then outside onto a ledge of the building, until Mrs. Steinmetz calms him down.

Disguising his voice to resemble his uncle's, Willoughby calls Loostgarten and misdirects him to demolish Hawk's house. Late that evening, Loostgarten telephones Hawk to confirm the demolition, waking Hawk from a nightmare; Hawk gives confirmation, but realizes too late that he has condemned his own residence, and angrily chases after Loostgarten after a portion of his house is demolished.

Hawk fakes a truce with Mrs. Steinmetz; thinking him to be sincere, Willoughby and Nicole go for dinner, while Mrs. Steinmetz invites Judson to the firehouse for a date of their own. However, Hawk arrives with heavy equipment to demolish the firehouse, prompting Herbie to search for Nicole and Willoughby. In Herbie's absence, the only means of defense is an antique fire hose, which Judson uses against Hawk's men until it bursts.

With Nicole and Willoughby on board, Herbie rounds up an army of other sentient Volkswagen Beetles from around the city, who chase after Hawk and his men, taking advantage of Hawk's fear of Herbie and causing his men to flee. Hawk is arrested after nearly getting knocked down by a police car. Willoughby and Nicole get married, and ride Herbie through an arch formed by his Volkswagen Beetle friends.

== Cast ==
- Helen Hayes as Mrs. Steinmetz
- Ken Berry as Willoughby Whitfield
- Stefanie Powers as Nicole Harris Whitfield
- John McIntire as Mr. Judson
- Keenan Wynn as Alonzo A. Hawk
- Huntz Hall as Judge
- Ivor Barry as Maxwell, Chauffeur
- Vito Scotti as Taxi Driver
- Liam Dunn as Doctor
- Elaine Devry as Millicent, Secretary
- Chuck McCann as Fred Loostgarten
- Richard X. Slattery as Traffic Commissioner
- Don Pedro Colley as Barnsdorf
- Larry J. Blake as Police Officer
- Iggie Wolfington as Lawyer, Second Team
- Jack Manning as Lawyer, First Team
- Hal Baylor as Demolition Truck Driver
- Herb Vigran as Window Washer
- Edward Ashley as Announcer At Chicken Race
- Beverly Carter as Chicken Run Queen
- Norm Grabowski as Security Guard #2
- Irwin Charone as Lawyer, Second Team
- Gail Bonney as Rich Woman In Mansion
- Burt Mustin as Rich Man In Mansion
- John Myhers as Announcer At San Francisco's Office of The President
- John Stephenson as Lawyer, Second Team
- Robert Carson as Lawyer, First Team
- Raymond Bailey as Lawyer, Second Team
- Arthur Space as Beach Caretaker
- John Hubbard as Angry Chauffeur
- Fritz Feld as Maitre d'
- Alvy Moore as Angry Taxi Driver
- Karl Lukas as Angry Construction Worker
- Paul Micale as Fisherman's Wharf Waiter
- John Zaremba as Lawyer, First Team
- Alan Carney as Judge With Cigar At Chicken Run
- Ken Sansom as Lawyer, First Team
- Maurice Marsac as French Waiter
- Hal Williams as Ticketing Police Officer

== Production notes ==
=== Casting ===
Fritz Feld, who appears as the Maitre d', and Vito Scotti, who plays the Italian cab driver, also appear in the sequel Herbie Goes Bananas as crewmen of the ship Sun Princess. Dan Tobin, Raymond Bailey, Iggie Wolfington, Robert S. Carson, and John Zaremba played some of Hawk's attorneys; Disney regular Norman Grabowski played "Security guard #2;" John Myhers played the San Francisco's Office of the President announcer; and Alan Carney played a judge at the Chicken Tournament.

While Keenan Wynn appears to be reprising his role of Alonzo Hawk from the Flubber movies, this may not technically be the case. He is called Alonzo P. Hawk in both Flubbers and Alonzo A. Hawk in Herbie, making it unclear whether the two series share a universe, or if the two Alonzo Hawks are related to each other.

=== Deleted scenes ===
The GAF View-Master reel set for the film shows a still from a deleted sequence where one of Hawk's nightmares has him about to be treated by a pair of white VW Beetle doctors, who decide to "take his carburetor out and have a look at it". As they approach Hawk, he is awakened by Loostgarten.

=== Vehicles ===
- The Herbies used for the film consisted both of 1963 and 1965 Beetles.
- The included 1965 models make for some continuity errors as the windows are larger on the 1965 cars.
- One of the VW Beetles used in the deleted nightmare sequence (see above) was first used in The Love Bug as a stunt car during the El Dorado race (also used for interior filming). Many years after Herbie Rides Again, the car's red cross, mechanical arms, and eyeball headlights were removed and restored to their former appearance.
- It is the first of the Herbie series in which Herbie is actually described as a "Volkswagen" – in the previous instalment The Love Bug – the producers were explicitly forbidden from mentioning the Volkswagen name anywhere in the film (although the logo was prominently seen). After it had been demonstrated the success of the film had probably helped, rather than hindered Beetle sales (its peak year for sales was 1971, three years after The Love Bug, the automaker lifted many of the restrictions on Walt Disney for subsequent films). By the time of Herbie Rides Again in 1974, the Beetle was being replaced by the Golf/Rabbit model in most markets around the world, and Beetle sales were declining, thus the films were instead seen as a promotion and marketing tool for the car.

=== "World's Highest Building" ===
"Hawk Plaza" is shown as a shining, twin-tower 130-story San Francisco skyscraper touted as "The World's Highest Building". Coincidentally, The Towering Inferno, released six months later, featured "The Glass Tower," a shining, single-tower 138-story San Francisco skyscraper touted as "the Tallest Building in the World". In actuality, New York's twin towers of the World Trade Center, "the Tallest Buildings in the World" had officially opened in 1973, and Chicago's 108-story Sears Tower claimed that title in May 1974, just one month before Herbie Rides Again was released.

== Release ==
Herbie Rides Again had its world premiere at the Odeon Leicester Square in London on February 11, 1974. It opened the following day to the public in London at the Dominion Theatre. It opened on June 6, 1974, in the United States.

=== Box office ===
The film grossed $38,229,000 at the United States and Canada box office, generating Disney $17,500,000 in theatrical rentals. The film earned rentals of around $13,300,000 overseas, giving worldwide rentals of almost $31 million.

=== Home media ===
Herbie Rides Again was first released on VHS on March 27, 1982.

Herbie Rides Again was first released on DVD in Region 1 on May 4, 2004, and was re-released as a 2-DVD double feature set along with Herbie Goes to Monte Carlo on April 26, 2009. On September 2, 2012, Herbie Rides Again was re-released on DVD as part of Herbie: 4-Movie Collection along with The Love Bug, Herbie Goes to Monte Carlo and Herbie Goes Bananas. The film was released on Blu-ray Disc on December 16, 2014, as a Disney Movie Club exclusive title.

== Reception ==
Vincent Canby of The New York Times wrote, "There's nothing harmful about 'Herbie Rides Again'; it's simply not very good." Variety reported, "It should prove gleeful enough for the kiddies, and at the short and sweet unspooling time of 88 minutes, painless pleasantry for adult chaperones as well." Charles Champlin of the Los Angeles Times wrote that the film "suffers from the slackening of freshness and invention which so often bedevils sequels... Still, 'Herbie Rides Again' preserves the bright, unreal feeling of that special Disney world which more and more is a world to itself." Gene Siskel gave the film two-and-a-half stars out of four and called it "a surprisingly tolerable sequel."

Herbie Rides Again presently holds a score of 80% at Rotten Tomatoes based on 6 reviews. On Metacritic, the film has a weighted average score of 49 out to 100, based on 5 critics, indicating "mixed or average" reviews.

== See also ==
- List of American films of 1974
