= Herbie =

Volkswagen Beetle, a character that is featured in several Disney motion pictures

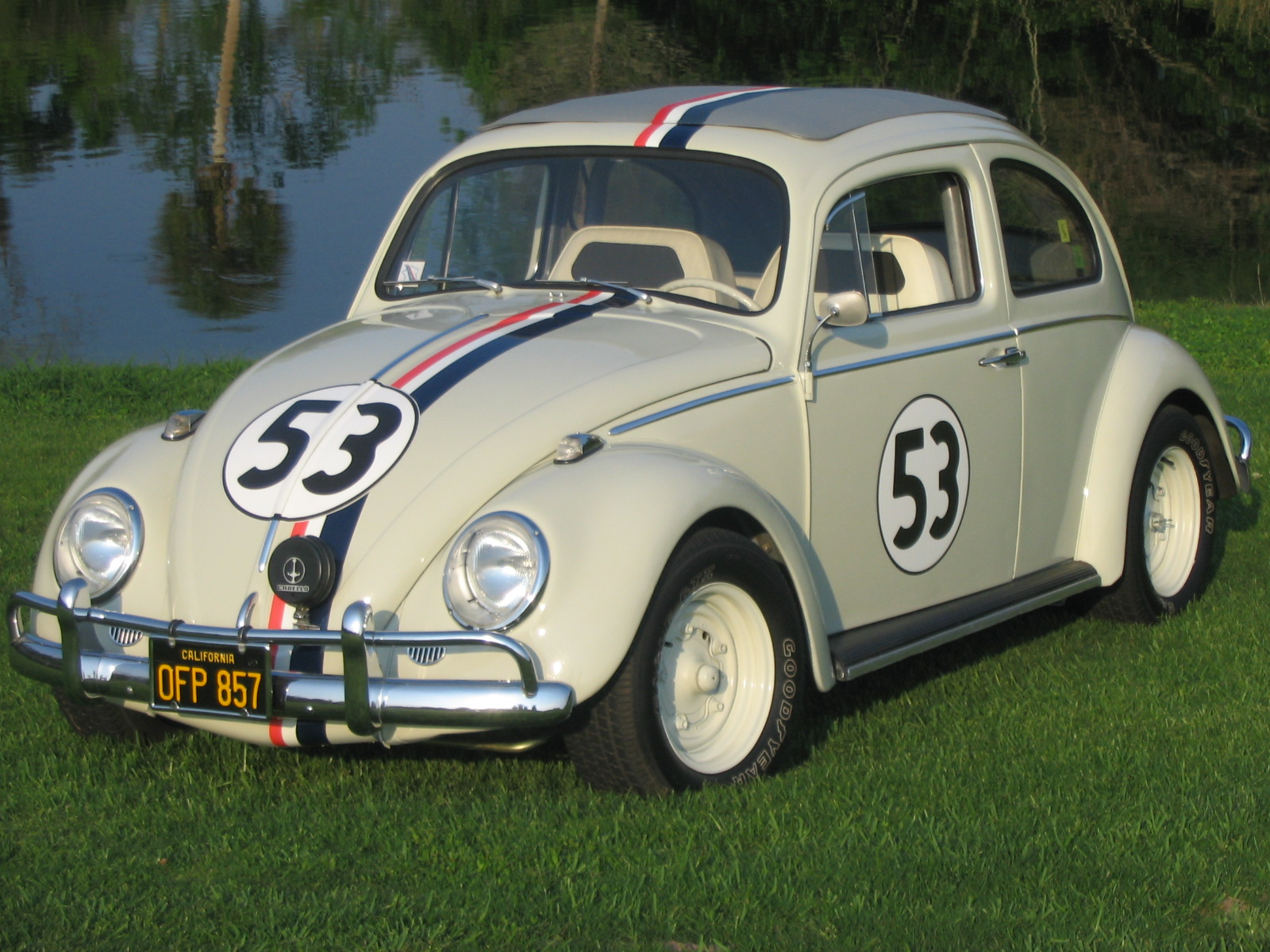
- An original Herbie used by Disney for the filming of Herbie Goes to Monte Carlo
- First appearance: The Love Bug
- Make/Model: Volkswagen Beetle

In-universe information
- Gender: Male
- Occupation: Racing car
- Nationality: German–American

Herbie, the Love Bug is a fictional sentient 1963 Volkswagen Beetle racing car that was featured in several Walt Disney motion pictures starting with The Love Bug in 1968. He has a mind of his own, being capable of driving himself and often becoming a serious contender in auto racing. Throughout most of the films he is distinguished by red, white, and blue racing stripes from the front to the back bumper, a pearl white body, a racing-style number "53" on the front luggage compartment lid, doors, engine lid, and a yellow-on-black 1963 California license plate with the registration "OFP 857".

== Fictional character biography ==
In The Love Bug (1968), Herbie is bought from the showroom of Peter Thorndyke (David Tomlinson) by San Francisco socialite Mrs. Van Luit for her upstairs maid, but is returned shortly afterward due to reliability problems. Race car driver Jim Douglas (Dean Jones) purchases the car after he is accused of stealing it. Tennessee Steinmetz (Buddy Hackett), Jim's best friend, a mechanic and his housemate, names the car "Herbie" after his uncle, a middleweight boxer whose nose was shaped like the hood of a Volkswagen Beetle. Jim notices the car's unnatural performance levels and decides to go racing with Herbie, to great success. In addition, Jim pursues a romantic relationship with Carole Bennett (Michele Lee), an assistant in Thorndyke's showroom. Carole eventually sides with Jim, Tennessee, and Herbie for the final El Dorado road race. After a race-long duel with Thorndyke, Herbie splits in two approaching the finish, but wins when the rear half (with Tennessee inside) crosses the line first. Fully repaired, Herbie takes the newlywed Jim and Carole on their honeymoon.

In Herbie Rides Again (1974), Herbie has retired from racing and has been left to Tennessee's widowed aunt, Mrs. Steinmetz (Helen Hayes). Jim has entered European racing circuits, whilst Tennessee resides in Tibet. Mrs. Steinmetz and her displaced neighbour, Nicole Harris (Stefanie Powers), try to save her house from being bulldozed by real estate developer Alonzo Hawk (Keenan Wynn) with the help of Herbie and Willoughby Whitfield (Ken Berry), Hawk's nephew.

In Herbie Goes to Monte Carlo (1977), Jim is reunited with Herbie and enters the Trans-France Race with his mechanic, Wheely Applegate (Don Knotts) in hopes of staging a career comeback. Herbie soon falls in love with a sentient Lancia Scorpion named Giselle, while Jim develops a relationship with Giselle’s driver, Diane Darcy (Julie Sommars). Herbie is also pursued by a pair of jewel thieves, Max and Quincy, who have hidden the stolen Étoile de Joie diamond in his gas tank. After rescuing Diane and Giselle from a crash into a river, Jim and Wheely drive Herbie to victory, overtaking their main rival, Bruno von Stickle (Eric Braeden), on the ceiling of the Monaco tunnel.

In Herbie Goes Bananas (1980), Jim has retired from racing and leaves Herbie to his nephew, Pete Stancheck (Stephen W. Burns), who plans to enter him in the Brazil Grand Primeo. In the interim, Herbie befriends an orphan named Paco (Joaquin Garay III) who gives the Volkswagen the nickname "Ocho" (due to the two digits in Herbie’s number "53" adding to 8). They wreak havoc on board the ship Sun Princess, prompting the overzealous Captain Blythe (Harvey Korman) to throw Herbie overboard. Herbie is rescued by Paco and disguised as a taxi, while they work to stop a gang of con artists from stealing a source of ancient Inca gold.

After returning from Mexico, Herbie is taken back by Jim, who opens a driving school in the TV series Herbie, the Love Bug. Jim meets a woman named Susan MacLane and her three kids, Julie, Matthew, and Robbie, who become friends with him and Herbie. Businessman Randy Bigelow aims to get Susan back; they had broken up during their wedding, but his schemes come to nought as Jim and Susan are married in the series finale.

Hank Cooper (Bruce Campbell) becomes the owner of Herbie in The Love Bug, the 1997 made-for-television movie. In it, it's revealed Herbie was created by a German engineer named Dr. Gustav Stumpfel. Stumpfel is duped into building Horace, an evil counterpart to Herbie, from a sample of the original metal; Herbie's key. Horace, influenced by the narcissism of his owner, Simon Moore, Hank's rival, crushes Herbie in an alleyway. Hank buries Herbie, but Jim Douglas' return sets Hank and his friends to rebuild Herbie (with the help of the repentant Dr. Stumpfel) to take on Simon and Horace in a final, one-on-one showdown race. Hank and Herbie defeat Simon and Horace, and Horace is destroyed attempting to sideswipe Herbie, falling into a ravine and exploding.

In Herbie: Fully Loaded (2005), Herbie is found in an abandoned garage and carried to Crazy Dave's junkyard where he is to be scrapped until he is bought by Maggie Peyton (Lindsay Lohan), who dreams of racing in NASCAR. Maggie quickly discovers that Herbie is sentient, upgrades his engine and bodywork, and enters various races, from a demolition derby to the final race of the Nextel Cup Series. In the end of the film, Maggie becomes a NASCAR driver and Herbie builds a relationship with his new love interest, a Volkswagen New Beetle (which is revealed to be sentient as well).

== Appearance in media ==
Herbie has been the central character of five theatrical-release films, a made-for-TV movie, and a short-lived television series.

=== Film series ===
Film	Release date	Director	Runtime	Box office gross		
Film	Release date	Director	Runtime	Domestic	Domestic adjusted	Worldwide
The Love Bug	December 24, 1968	Robert Stevenson	108 minutes	$51,264,000	$450,071,869	N/A
Herbie Rides Again	June 6, 1974	Robert Stevenson	88 minutes	$38,229,000	$249,571,913	N/A
Herbie Goes to Monte Carlo	June 24, 1977	Vincent McEveety	104 minutes	$29,000,000	$152,305,777	N/A
Herbie Goes Bananas	June 25, 1980	Vincent McEveety	98 minutes	$18,000,000	$69,969,068	N/A
The Love Bug	November 30, 1997	Peyton Reed	88 minutes	— TV film —	— TV film —	— TV film —
Herbie: Fully Loaded	June 22, 2005	Angela Robinson	100 minutes	$66,023,816	$108,839,738	$144,146,816
Total				$205,516,816	$1,030,758,364	$280,639,816+

=== Television series ===
A television series, Herbie, the Love Bug, was aired in 1982 on CBS. Dean Jones reprised his role as Jim Douglas for it. Five episodes were made.

=== Other official appearances ===
A Herbie model at Disney's All-Star Movies Resort at Walt Disney World.

- In 1990, Herbie made an appearance in the second season of the 1980s revival of The Mickey Mouse Club.
- An animated version made a brief cameo in the House of Mouse episodes "Max's New Car" and "Dining Goofy".
- Two racing video games starring Herbie were released by Disney Interactive Studios: Disney's Herbie: Fully Loaded (2005) and Herbie Rescue Rally (2007).
- Herbie used to make an appearance in the Lights, Motors, Action!: Extreme Stunt Show at Disney theme parks, but was later replaced by Lightning McQueen.
- Herbie has had numerous appearances in Disney parades, and has taken part in Disney on Ice and Disney on Parade, usually with painted-on eyes and teeth, along with a moving tongue. This Herbie model has been moved to Disney's All-Star Movies Resort at Walt Disney World and is the centerpiece of "The Love Bug" themed area.
- Herbie appears in a Disneyland 50th Anniversary TV commercial in which No. 53 is used for transportation by Mickey, Goofy, Huey, Dewey, and Louie to get to Disneyland.
- Herbie made a cameo in 2009 Boom! Studios Cars: Radiator Springs comic series as a character in the background.

=== Unofficial appearances ===
- Herbie has an unofficial appearance along with Ray Peyton, Jr. (portrayed by Fully Loaded actor Breckin Meyer) in a segment of Robot Chicken titled "Horny Robot Redux". In the segment, he is a New Beetle rather than an original one and has animated eyes and a mouth. He also appears in the Kingdom Hearts segment of a Season 11 episode.
- Herbie has a brief cameo in Episode 195 of American Dad!, "Stan Smith as Keanu Reeves as Stanny Utah in Point Breakers", in which he helps Stan Smith escape from poachers and wolves. In the episode, he has incorrect stripes and different "53" font.
- The Herbie film series spawned a knockoff series of Superbug films. A white Beetle, split in half and numbered "53", makes a cameo in the first film, even though its name is never mentioned.
- Herbie had a cameo in The Simpsons episode "Beyond Blunderdome" in the Movie Car Museum. He can also be seen in "Guess Who's Coming to Criticize Dinner" in the Planet Hype restaurant.
- Herbie makes an appearance in Forza as a paint job for the 1960s Beetle.
- Two of the liveries available for the "BF Weevil" (the Grand Theft Auto equivalent of the Beetle) in Grand Theft Auto Online are based on Herbie.
- Herbie makes appearances during a race and other scenes of the "First" music video by Lindsay Lohan, a song featured on her debut album and the Herbie: Fully Loaded soundtrack.
- A futuristic version of Herbie appears among the crashed vehicles in Futurama Comics No. 82.
- Detroit Red Wings defenseman Moritz Seider chose jersey No. 53 after watching The Love Bug with his parents the night before.

=== Future ===
In 2017, it was reported that a new Herbie series was in development at Disney XD. The plot revolved around a child named Lili or Landon Reed, "part scientist, part entrepreneur, part daredevil" who realizes, "when his or her parents go missing, that they've secretly been working on a government project: a talking car named Herbie. He is the key to helping the kid reunite with his or her parents, but a gang of criminals also wants to get its paws on the state-of-the-art vehicle." The concept of this planned series was later developed into Fast Layne without any Herbie references, making his future uncertain.

== Guises and paint schemes ==
Herbie's appearance remained consistent throughout the first four film entries as well as the 1982 television series. There were only minor, subtle changes. The 1997 TV movie and Herbie: Fully Loaded featured major overhauls in appearance, as there were different production crews working for Disney by this time.

To create the effect of Herbie driving himself, Disney concocted a detailed system of sprockets and pulleys connected to a second steering column under the front seat for a rear seat driver. There was also a second set of pedal assemblies, clutch cables and a shifter extension. In The Love Bug, the rear seat driver sat low enough to see over the windshield but still out of the view of the camera. For Herbie Rides Again and Herbie Goes to Monte Carlo, Disney installed a hood-mounted Carello fog light that concealed a small camera which allowed the rear seat driver to view the street and sit lower.

=== The Love Bug (1968) ===
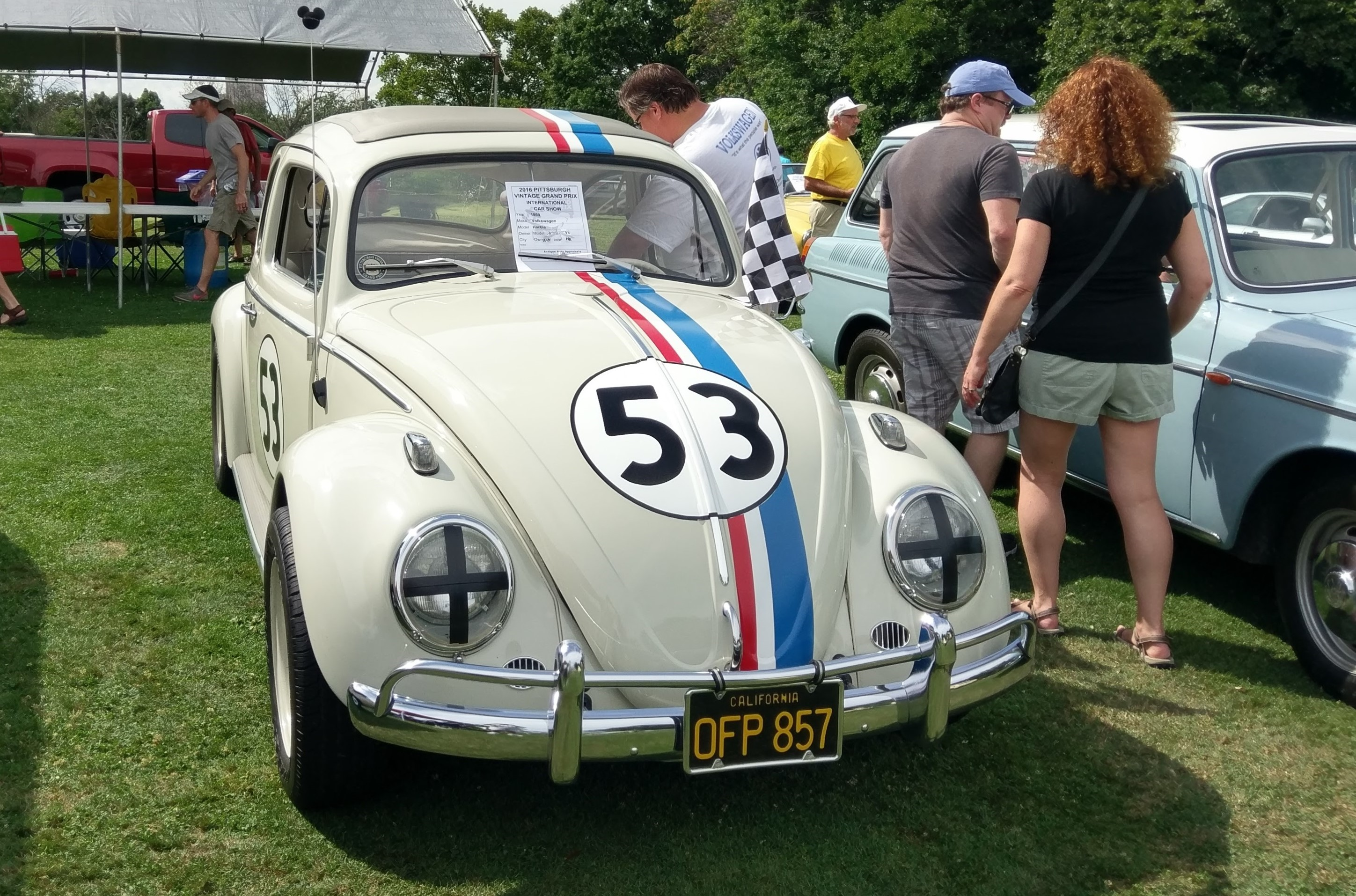
Original film car used in The Love Bug

In the original film, The Love Bug, the racing stripes differ from those in later movies; they do not cover Herbie's valances or louvers and the blue is a lighter shade. Also, Herbie features color-keyed running boards, while in later films the running boards are standard black.

During the film, depending on the scene, the wheels change from standard VW wheels (although fitted with plain hubcaps with no VW logo) to specially widened wheels on the racing Herbies. During one scene (when Tennessee is hanging out of the window), the number "53" (a.k.a. "gumball") on the passenger-side door is missing. The door is also cut along the lower edge at an angle to enable the car to tilt over to the right on two wheels.

One of the modified racing Herbies featured a Porsche 356 engine, brakes, and KONI shock absorbers. All Herbies in The Love Bug had the VW badges removed from the hood and featured plain non-VW hubcaps. The hood-mounted VW logo was replaced with a plain disc of the same diameter, colored to match the body. All VW logos were removed to avoid any trademark conflicts.

=== Herbie Rides Again (1974) ===
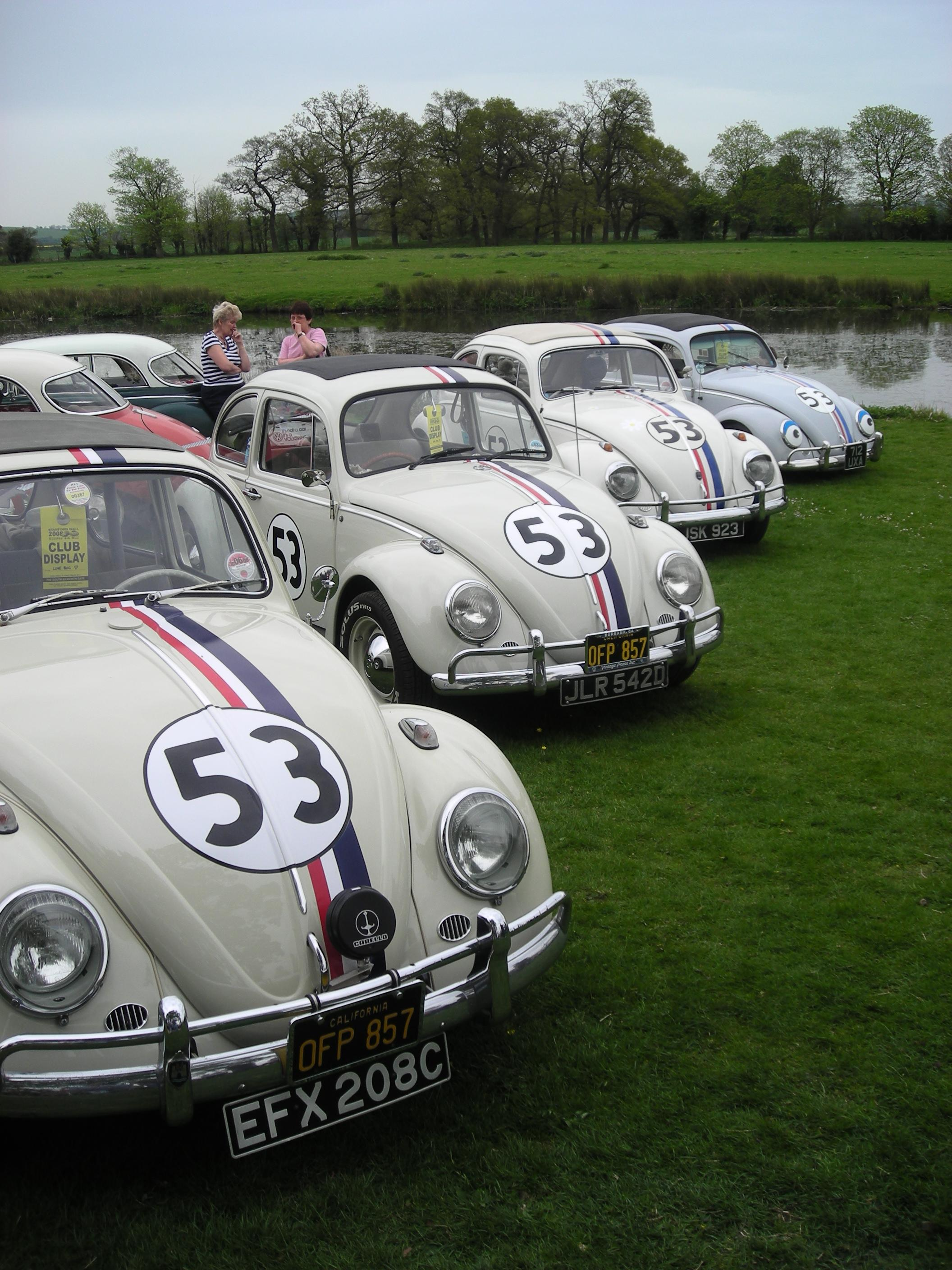
Fan-made Herbie replicas at Stamford Hall

In Herbie Rides Again, Herbie features revised racing stripes, with the original blue switched to a dark navy. In addition, they were applied over the valances and louvers, and the front hood was recycled for the 1982 television series Herbie, the Love Bug. Herbie also received a hood-mounted Carello fog light, and the running boards were now the more conventional black.

Additionally, Herbie was running on standard wheels yet again. Volkswagen also promoted the film by having a Type 1 Beetle, complete with Herbie livery, in every showroom. There are various model errors in this film, such as the later "big window" (post-1964) Beetles being used. Also of note is the "cut-n-shut" engine cover after the warehouse break-in. The Beetle used was a late model, having a more bulbous flat-bottomed lid with an earlier rounded bottom edge welded on.

After the success of The Love Bug, it was heavily endorsed by Volkswagen, which was in financial trouble at the time, when Beetle sales in North America were considerably lower than in previous decades. As such, the company insisted that the VW logos appear on Herbie. Both the hub cap VW logo and hood-mounted VW logo were reinstated at the company's request.

=== Herbie Goes to Monte Carlo (1977) ===
In Herbie Goes to Monte Carlo, Herbie is again fitted with wide racing wheels (Goodyear GT radials), and has an external fuel filler cap. Post-1967 Beetles did feature the fuel tank accessible on the right side behind the fender; the silver cap itself, however, was fake and added for the film's storyline. With the addition of the fuel filler, the antenna is now a retractable unit fitted on the front cowling, near the windshield wipers. Herbie has a roll cage again, and Monte Carlo racing stickers on his windows (one on the front window, two on the left back window, and one on the rear window). The hood-mounted Carello fog light returns with an added black cover sporting the company name. Herbie now has gray bucket seats instead of stitched seats. and an asymmetrical door mirror. There were a total of 9 VWs used in Herbie Goes to Monte Carlo. Many of them were recycled for use in Herbie Goes Bananas.

=== Herbie Goes Bananas (1980) ===
In Herbie Goes Bananas, the hood-mounted light, the grey roll cage bar, the Monte Carlo racing stickers, and the silver gas cap were removed. Herbie still had the gray bucket seats, asymmetrical door mirror and Goodyear GT Radial racing tires and rims. The sunroof was the original light gray rather than the dark gray from Monte Carlo. The rust seen on the car in the movie was painted on some of the Herbies. The car that "walks the plank" in the movie was never recovered from the sea. It was tossed overboard from the "M.N. Coromuel" ferry ship (not The Sun Princess cruise ship). The car is somewhere between La Paz and Baja California. The car thrown overboard was not a proper car and had many wooden parts.

Herbie Goes Bananas also featured the same later model door mirror as Herbie Goes to Monte Carlo. Herbie set a Guinness World Record as the first car to go through the Panama Canal during filming in 1979. The Herbie name is only mentioned three times in the film by the garage owner, other than the two times Herbie honks his horn at Paco trying to say his name when Paco couldn't understand what he was saying.

Some of these Herbie cars were recycled for Herbie, the Love Bug in 1982.

One of the actual film cars used with its flip wheel chassis in the bullfighting scenes now resides in Sydney. Another one was displayed in the Cars of the Stars Motor Museum until its closure in 2011. Since then, its location remains unknown.

Volkswagen ceased the sale of Beetles in the United States one year before the film's release.

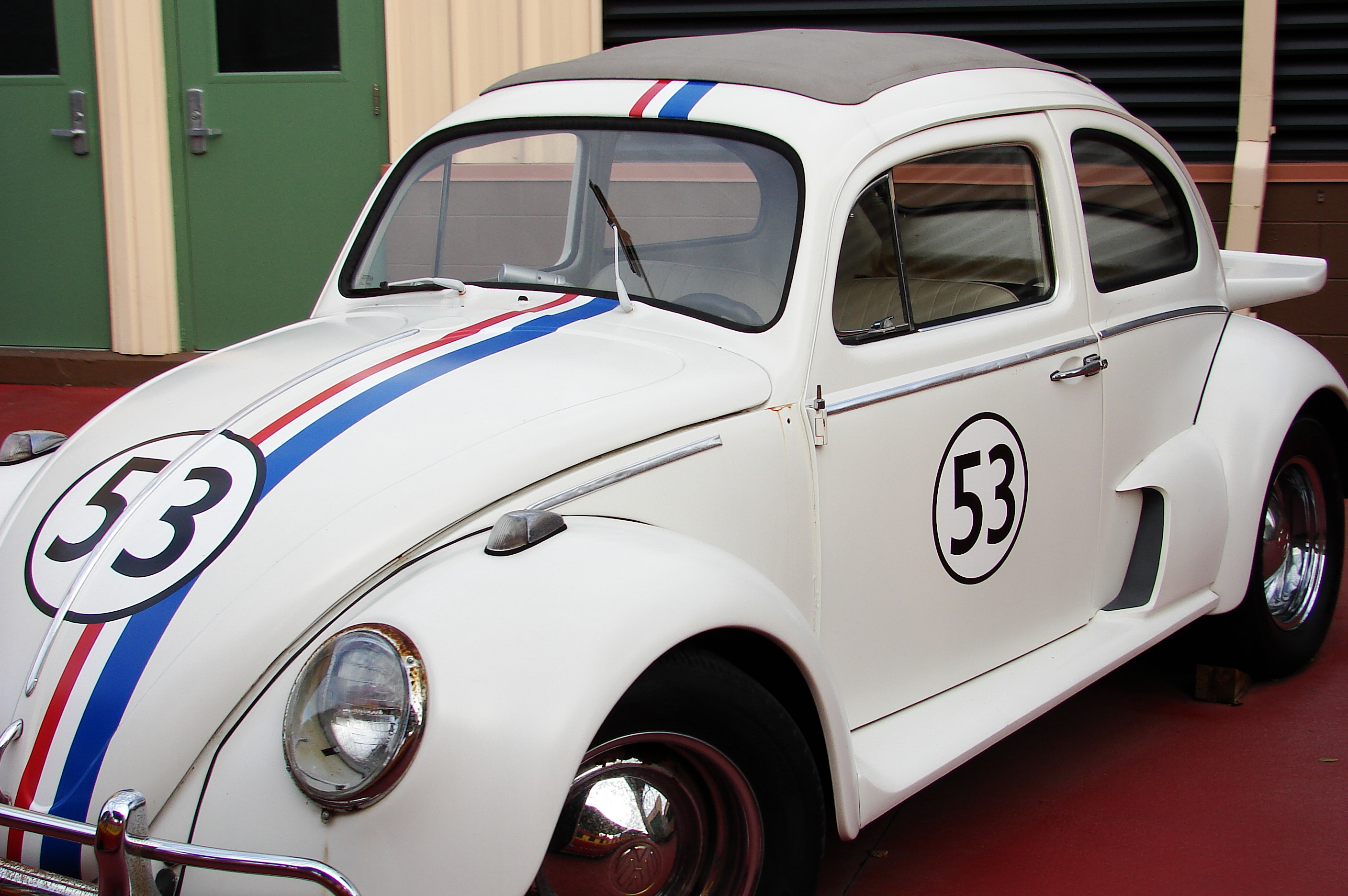
2005 Fully Loaded version of Herbie, specifically his "Street Race" look

=== The Love Bug (1997) ===
In The Love Bug television film there were some significant changes. The graphics used were copied from the 1974 Volkswagen of America decal kit, and the position on the front hood number "53" was higher up. The racing stripes were different sizes, and the shade of blue reverted to the lighter version of the original 1968 movie. The sunroof was a solid white (vs. gray) and missing the racing stripes. The wheels were standard Beetle wheels, instead of the wider Goodyear GT Radial racing tires used in Herbie Goes to Monte Carlo and Herbie Goes Bananas, and the seats were regular instead of the previous gray buckets..

=== Herbie: Fully Loaded (2005) ===
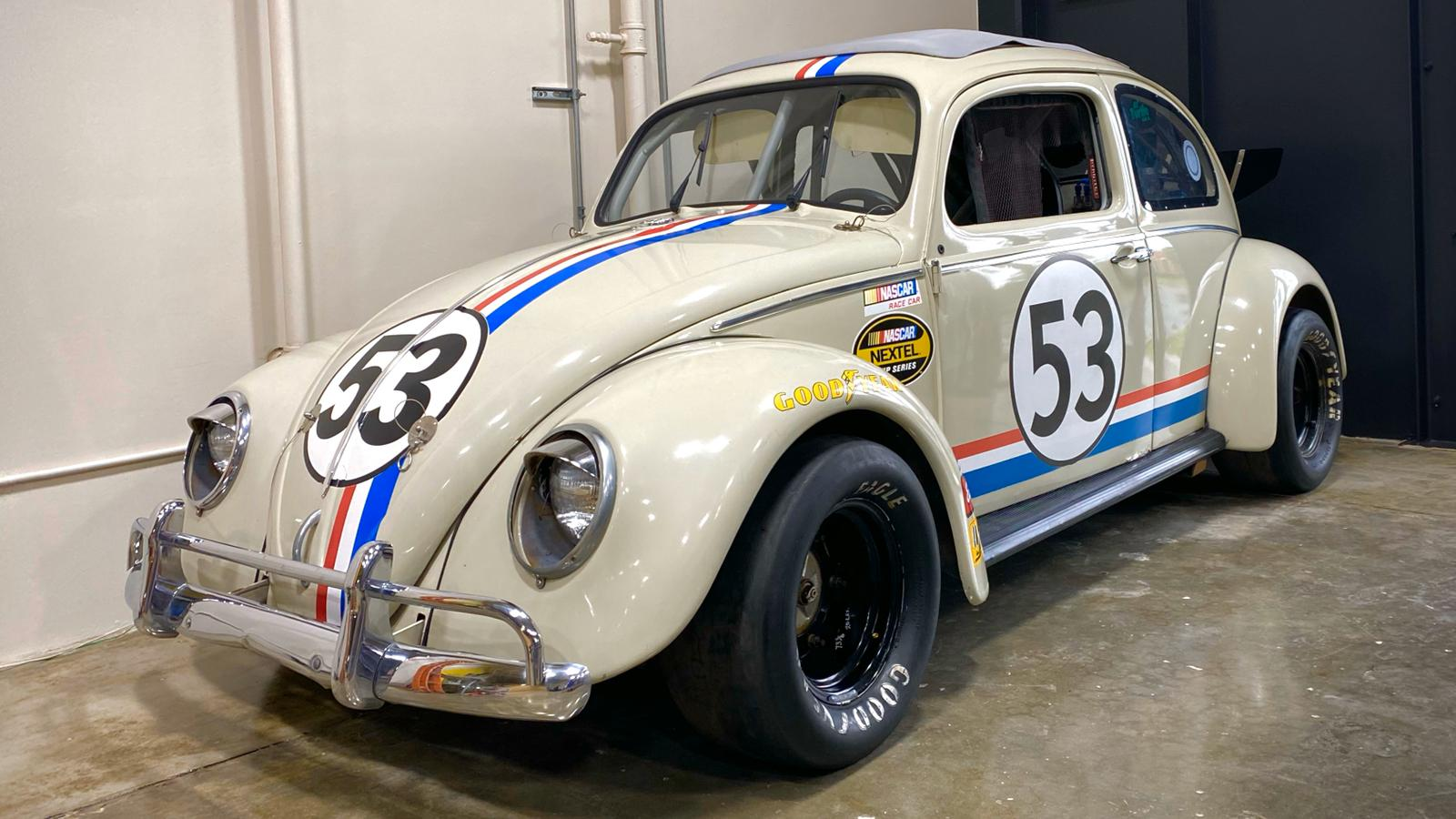
Herbie "personality car" preserved at Electric Dreams Slot Car in El Segundo, California. This car remotely moves its eyes, bumper, hood, doors, visors, and antenna – giving it human-like characteristics.

In Herbie: Fully Loaded, Herbie, who in this film seemed to be able to show emotions through anthropomorphized expressions mimicking a face, went through several "costume changes" throughout the movie, changing his style dramatically from scene to scene.

- The font of the number "53" is different, and slightly bigger and lower down on the front hood. The racing stripe is missing from the sunroof and the stripes are painted the way they were in the first four Herbie movies. The front license plate is not present.
- For the "street racer" look, Herbie has brighter white paint, a whale-tail rear spoiler, air intakes in front of the rear fenders, lowered suspension, no rear bumper, wider tires, and a windowed rear engine cover through which blue LED lighting show. A nitrous oxide system is in evidence to boost his speed during the race against Trip Murphy.
- During the demolition derby, Herbie is stripped down with no vehicle interior panels, vehicle racing seats or special street racing body parts. The sunroof cover has been removed, although the cutout remains to play important roles during the demolition derby. Herbie still retains "53" on the sides but with Targets or Bullseyes sprayed over the logos. All vehicular modifications from Herbie's Street Racer Version were dismantled and completely thrown away for good. Crash later spray paints red Bull's-eye targets on the front doors and hood.
- For the "NASCAR" look, Herbie gets a new, more off-white paint job, NASCAR sponsor decals, a different duck-tail rear spoiler, a roll cage, Goodyear Eagle NASCAR tires, wider fenders, no front turn signals, no back bumper, no passenger seat, no back seat.

More than 30 different Herbies were used during the shooting of this film. Three original cars are known to be on display: one at the Volo Auto Museum in Illinois and two in California from the NASCAR racing segment, a fully motorized version at the Peterson Automotive Museum and a "personality car" at the hobby store Electric Dreams.
