= Don DaGradi =

American screenwriter (1911-1991)

- Born: March 1, 1911; New York City, New York, United States
- Died: August 4, 1991 (aged 80); Friday Harbor, Washington, United States
- Occupation: Screenwriter

Don DaGradi (March 1, 1911 – August 4, 1991) was an American writer for Disney who started out as a layout artist on 1940s cartoons including "Der Fuehrer's Face" in 1943. He eventually moved into animated features with the film Lady and the Tramp in 1955. He also worked as a color and styling or sequence consultant on many other motion pictures for Disney. His greatest achievement was for his visual screenplay for Mary Poppins in 1964 for which he shared an Oscar nomination for Best Adapted Screenplay with Bill Walsh. Don DaGradi died August 4, 1991, in Friday Harbor, Washington. He was named a Disney Legend posthumously, only months after his death. DaGradi lived in Friday Harbor, WA with his wife Betty and two children.

In the 2013 film Saving Mr. Banks, DaGradi is portrayed by actor Bradley Whitford.

== Filmography ==
- Dumbo (1941) - production designer
- The Olympic Champ (1942) (short) - layout artist
- How to Fish (1942) (short) - layout artist
- Der Fuehrer's Face (1942) (short) - layout artist
- Victory Vehicles (1943) (short) - layout artist
- Victory Through Air Power (1943) (documentary) - art direction
- How to Be a Sailor (1944) (short) - layout artist
- The Three Caballeros (1944) - layout artist
- Duck Pimples (1945) (short) - layout artist
- Hockey Homicide (1945) (short) - layout artist
- Make Mine Music (1946) - layout artist
- Fun & Fancy Free (1947) - layout artist
- The Legend of Johnny Appleseed (1948) (short) - layout artist
- The Adventures of Ichabod and Mr. Toad (1949) - color and styling
- Cinderella (1950) - color and styling
- The Brave Engineer (1950) (short) - layout artist
- Alice in Wonderland (1951) - color and styling
- Susie the Little Blue Coupe (1952) (short) - story
- Peter Pan (1953) - color and styling
- A Story of Dogs (1954) - special art work
- Lady and the Tramp (1955) - story
- Adventures in Fantasy (1957) (TV) - layout artist
- Four Fabulous Characters (1957) (TV) - layout artist
- Sleeping Beauty (1959) - writer
- Darby O'Gill and the Little People (1959) - special art styling
- Pollyanna (1960) - sequence consultant
- Kidnapped (1960) - story sketches
- The Parent Trap (1961) - sequence consultant
- The Absent Minded Professor (1961) - sequence consultant
- Son of Flubber (1963) - writer
- Mary Poppins (1964) - writer
- Lt. Robin Crusoe, U.S.N. (1966) - writer
- Blackbeard's Ghost (1968) - writer
- The Love Bug (1968) - writer
- Scandalous John (1971) - writer
- Bedknobs and Broomsticks (1971) - writer
