= Disney's Herbie: Fully Loaded =

2005 video game

- Developer: Climax Handheld Games
- Publisher: Buena Vista Games
- Platform: Game Boy Advance
- Release: NA: June 21, 2005; EU: August 5, 2005
- Genre: Racing
- Mode: Single-player

Disney's Herbie: Fully Loaded is a racing game developed by Climax Handheld Games and published by Buena Vista Games for the Game Boy Advance. It was released in North America on June 21, 2005, and in Europe on August 5, 2005. It is loosely based on the 2005 film Herbie: Fully Loaded and features stills from the movie in the game.

== Gameplay ==
The game's story mode loosely follows the plot of the film and follows Herbie as the car races to win the championship. Stills from the movie are featured as cutscenes and allow for players to move with the progression of the movie's story. If the player fails to place first in any race, they are shown a Game Over screen and booted to the menu to start over.

There are eight different tracks in the game and there is no multiplayer mode. The player controls Herbie throughout each race. The player can collect stars on the road in order to activate tricks that boost Herbie's overall speed and slow down other racers.

== Development ==
The game was showcased at E3 2005.

== Reception ==
System	GameSpot
Game Boy Advance	5/10

Disney's Herbie: Fully Loaded received mostly mixed reception from critics, who praised the game's 3D graphics while disparaging about the poor AI for opposing racers and the lack of alternative modes. GameSpot's Frank Provo called the game a "missed opportunity" and felt that Lindsay Lohan voice samples "would have gone a long way toward pepping things up." GameZone's Anise Hollingshead felt that Herbie: Fully Loaded was "ho-hum" and felt that there "isn't much to this average game". Nintendo Power remarked that the game was "a lackluster effort at capturing the spirit of the film."

The graphics were widely praised, however. GameSpot's Frank Provo called them the game's "lone bright spot" and was impressed by the level of detail for Herbie in particular.
