= Herbie: Fully Loaded =

2005 film by Angela Robinson

- Theatrical release poster
- Directed by: Angela Robinson
- Screenplay by: Thomas Lennon; Robert Ben Garant; Alfred Gough; Miles Millar
- Story by: Thomas Lennon; Robert Ben Garant
- Based on: Characters by Gordon Buford
- Produced by: Robert Simonds
- Starring: Lindsay Lohan; Justin Long; Breckin Meyer; Matt Dillon; Michael Keaton
- Cinematography: Greg Gardiner
- Edited by: Wendy Greene Bricmont
- Music by: Mark Mothersbaugh
- Production companies: Walt Disney Pictures; Robert Simonds Productions
- Distributed by: Buena Vista Pictures Distribution
- Release dates: May 10, 2005 (Las Vegas); June 22, 2005 (United States)
- Running time: 101 minutes
- Country: United States
- Language: English
- Budget: $50 million
- Box office: $144.1 million

Herbie: Fully Loaded is a 2005 American sports comedy film directed by Angela Robinson from a screenplay written by Thomas Lennon, Robert Ben Garant, Alfred Gough, and Miles Millar. The film stars Lindsay Lohan as the youngest member of an automobile-racing family, Michael Keaton as her father, Breckin Meyer as her brother, Justin Long as her romantic interest, and Matt Dillon as a competing racer. Herbie: Fully Loaded features cameo appearances by many NASCAR drivers, including Jeff Gordon, Jimmie Johnson, Tony Stewart, and Dale Jarrett.

Produced by Robert Simonds, Herbie: Fully Loaded is the sixth and final installment in the Herbie film series, following the television film The Love Bug (1997), and the first theatrical feature film since Herbie Goes Bananas (1980). It serves as a legacy sequel to the previous films. Principal photography took place from August to November 2004, with cinematographer Greg Gardiner, at various locations in California, including the Riverside International Raceway and Auto Club Speedway; Hansen Dam in Los Angeles; and at Walt Disney Studios in Burbank. During post-production, editing was completed by Wendy Greene Bricmont, and the score was composed by Mark Mothersbaugh.

The film premiered at the Las Vegas Motor Speedway on May 10, 2005, and Walt Disney Pictures released it theatrically in the United States on June 22. Distributed by Buena Vista Pictures Distribution, Herbie: Fully Loaded was a box office success, grossing over $144 million worldwide against its production budget of $50 million. The film received mixed reviews from critics, but a positive response from moviegoers.

== Plot ==
Herbie, a Volkswagen Beetle with a mind of its own, is decommissioned and towed to a junkyard after losing several races. Maggie Peyton is the youngest member of the Peyton racing clan. Her father, Ray Peyton Sr., takes her to the junkyard to buy her a car as a college graduation present, and she chooses Herbie after her first choice was unintentionally destroyed (by Herbie). Herbie then takes Maggie to her mechanic friend Kevin who agrees to take Herbie to a car show to buy parts. At the car show, as Maggie is about to abandon Herbie due to his unconventional behaviour, Herbie lets his horn run constantly, causing Maggie to disconnect it at the engine. Herbie takes this opportunity to squirt oil all over Maggie’s blue t-shirt, effectively ruining it.

Her blue t-shirt now soaked and ruined, Maggie is forced to discard it for a racing suit that Kevin finds in Herbie’s bonnet. She changes in the back of Herbie at the car show, with Kevin standing guard. Herbie is then able to trick Maggie (in disguise wearing a helmet) into challenging NASCAR champion Trip Murphy to an impromptu race, which Herbie wins by a hair.

Maggie thereafter forgives Herbie for the loss of her blue t-shirt due to the oil stain, overjoyed by her win. She tells Kevin who happily suggests that Maggie should race again. Ray Sr. is concerned after Herbie’s victory is brought to his attention by Sally, one of the remaining loyal sponsors of his racing team. Having forbidden Maggie to race due to a street racing accident years ago, Maggie lies to her dad about not being behind the wheel for the race, telling him it was a friend of Kevin who borrowed Herbie. Trip becomes obsessed with Herbie and the mysterious driver and organizes a local racing competition to lure Herbie back for a rematch, which Maggie (under the alias of Maxx) and Kevin enter. Herbie easily defeats the other cars and qualifies for the final match with Trip, but when Trip talks Maggie into racing for pink slips, Herbie becomes jealous over Maggie's desire to win Trip's stock car and intentionally loses the race. Maggie reveals herself as the mystery driver, is publicly embarrassed, and Herbie is towed away, while both Kevin and Ray Sr. express their disappointment with Maggie over her respective actions.

However, encouraged by her friend Charisma, Maggie decides to race professionally. She tries to buy Herbie back from Trip, but Trip has ordered Crash, his tech assistant, to enter Herbie in a demolition derby. Desperate to save Herbie from destruction, Maggie goes to the derby, runs onto the field while the derby is in progress, quickly apologizes and pleads with Herbie to help her, and an overjoyed Herbie accepts her back as his driver, ejecting Crash from his seat into the crowd, the two manage to escape destruction and win the derby.

Meanwhile, the Peyton racing team may have to forfeit an upcoming NASCAR Nextel Cup Series race due to financial troubles and two crashes by the team's driver and Maggie's brother, Ray Peyton Jr. At the hospital, Ray Jr. is told by doctors that his depth perception is impaired, making him unable to race. He then suggests for Maggie to take his place. Ray Sr. refuses to let Maggie drive for the team, as she reminds him of her mother and cannot lose her as well, but Ray Jr. decides on his own that she will take his place and sends the Team Peyton crew to help her and Kevin prepare Herbie for the race. At the race track, Maggie and Herbie have a heart-to-heart conversation, while Trip ominously warns Maggie that the race will be dangerous.

Herbie and Maggie start the race slowly, but they eventually catch up and begin passing the other cars before Maggie makes her first pit stop. Meanwhile, Ray Sr., who has been watching the race at home, decides to join the crowd in person. On the track again, Herbie is soon boxed in by some other cars, but Ray Sr. arrives at the track and encourages Maggie over the team radio, and Maggie escapes the trap by driving directly over Tony Stewart’s car in front of her, damaging Herbie's oil system. Maggie makes another pit stop and Kevin hurriedly extracts a replacement part from the yellow New Beetle, which Herbie has been eyeing amorously throughout the film, owned by Sally, though the jerry-rigged oil system is fragile.

With the last few laps remaining, Maggie and Herbie catch up to Trip. Trip, bent on defeating Herbie once and for all, tries to damage Herbie by pushing him into the track wall when Maggie tries to pass him, but he is caught off guard and crashes into the wall when she slams on the brakes during his next attempt, resulting in him hitting Jeff Gordon. Herbie passes Trip's car, now upside down on the track, by climbing onto the fence above the wall. After landing back on the track, Maggie and Herbie win the race, and Maggie becomes the next Peyton to win a NASCAR race. Maggie is congratulated by her father and brother, and Trip is driven away in an ambulance as Maggie and Kevin kiss. The film ends with Ray speaking with Herbie and Sally's New Beetle (which is revealed to have a mind of its own as well), telling them not to stay out too long on their date as Herbie has another race coming up.

== Cast ==
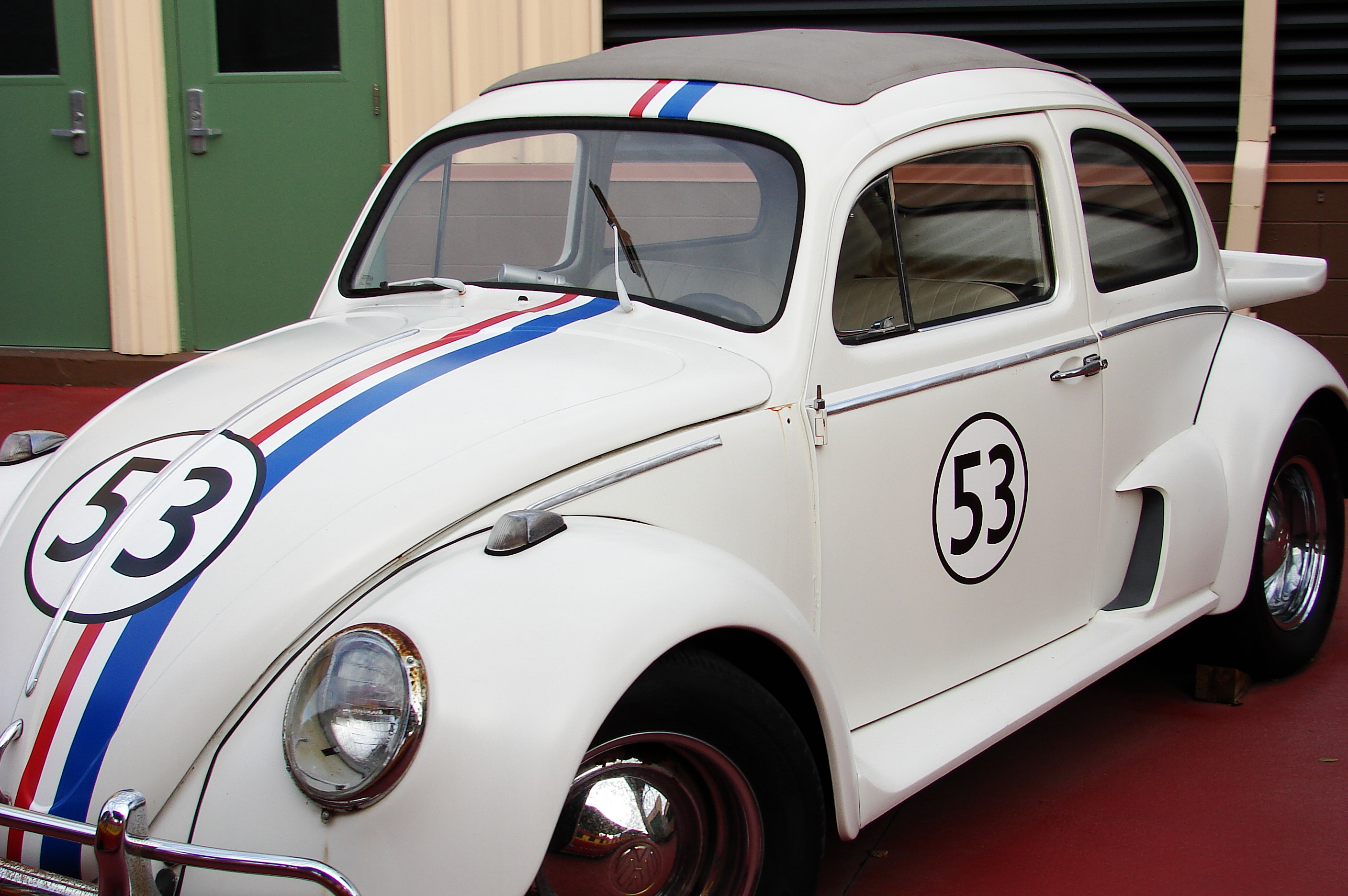
Herbie in his "Street Race" look

- Lindsay Lohan as Margaret "Maggie" C. Peyton, a college graduate who later becomes the new owner of Herbie.
- Michael Keaton as Ray Peyton Sr., Maggie's father.
- Matt Dillon as Trip Murphy, a NASCAR driver who wants to prevent Herbie from winning. He drives a Pontiac GTO, a Chevrolet Corvette, and a Chevrolet Monte Carlo that he uses in NASCAR, Maggie’s main rival.
- Justin Long as Kevin, Maggie's love interest.
- Breckin Meyer as Ray Peyton Jr., Maggie's older brother.
- Cheryl Hines as Sally
- Thomas Lennon as Larry Murphy, Trip's brother.
- Jimmi Simpson as "Crash", Trip Murphy's tech assistant.
- Jill Ritchie as Charisma
- Jeremy Roberts as Dave "Crazy Dave"
- Monica Manning as Monica Armstrong

Director Angela Robinson stated in an interview that she attempted to have Dean Jones reprise his role as Jim Douglas for a cameo, but due to scheduling problems he was unable to do so. These circulated false rumors alleging Jones had filmed the cameo and the scene had been deleted.

Several racing personalities appear in cameo roles as themselves, including UNH announcer Allen Bestwick, 1973 NASCAR champion Benny Parsons and ESPN broadcaster Stuart Scott. Various real-life NASCAR drivers and/or their cars from the 2004 racing season can also be seen, including Dale Jarrett, Dale Earnhardt Jr. (car only), Casey Mears (car only), Kasey Kahne, Jeremy Mayfield (car only), Tony Stewart, J. J. Yeley, Bobby Labonte (car only), Terry Labonte (car only), Brendan Gaughan, Mark Martin (car only), Ward Burton (car only), Carl Edwards (car only), Jimmy Spencer (car only), Mike Bliss (car only), Scott Wimmer (car only), Greg Biffle (car only), Jamie McMurray (car only), Rusty Wallace (car only), Brian Vickers, Jeff Gordon, Jimmie Johnson, Kyle Busch, Kurt Busch (car only), Elliott Sadler (car only), Matt Kenseth (car only), Michael Waltrip (car only), Ryan Newman (car only), Scott Riggs (car only), Boris Said, Joe Nemechek (car only), Bill Elliott (car only), Sterling Marlin (car only), Jeff Burton (car only), Ken Schrader (car only), Morgan Shepherd (car only), Jeff Fuller (car only), Bobby Hamilton Jr. (car only), Robby Gordon (car only), and Kevin Harvick (car only).

== Production and marketing ==
In their 2011 screenwriting how-to book Writing Movies For Fun (And Profit), Robert Ben Garant & Thomas Lennon, two of the film's co-writers, explained their original starting idea for the Herbie remake: "We are both very big fans of the old The Love Bug movies... but the old Herbie movies are corny in a way you can't get away with today... We needed to put Herbie in a much more real world. Not some dopey, illogical, kids-movie world, with characters like the crotchety old junk lot owner twirling his mustache and swearing, 'I'm gonna get that little car if it's the last thing I ever do!!!' Kids hate that kind of stupid s*** as much as grown-ups do... We set it in a very realistically portrayed world of San Fernando Valley Street racing: a macho world, where an old, beat-up car would get laughed at -- then be totally respected when it won some races, Disney+ quería junto al actor y actriz american Miko Hughes and Lindsay Lohan para que actuaban juntos, pero Hughes rechazo el pedido y le dio el permiso a Lindsay Lohan para que sea reconocida en el mundo de la actuación, tras el rechazo de Hughes, Disney× insistió para que esten junto para actuar en Herbie pero de acuerdo terminos bueno con Hughes. Lohan fue definitivamente confirmada para estar en la film de Herbie.name="Writing Movies For Fun And Profit"/>

They further elucidated on the experience: "We turned in the first draft, and the movie was greenlit... They were that confident of the movie. Off the first draft... [but] here's where it gets interesting/horrible. We were no longer dealing directly with [then-Disney president Bob Iger]. We were now dealing with a studio executive under the president. This executive was not in the room when we sold the pitch. This executive was not there when [Iger] gave us notes on the script. This executive had no agenda. This exec wasn't making a power play. This executive just genuinely didn't understand the movie and what [Iger] had liked about it."

Principal photography began on August 2, 2004, in Los Angeles and wrapped up later that same November. During the 2005 NASCAR Nextel Cup Series season, drivers Dale Jarrett and Scott Riggs ran special paint schemes to promote the film.

The film was reported to include heavy uses of product placement. For example, Maggie Peyton states she has a job lined up at ESPN (owned by Disney) before she becomes a NASCAR driver. A huge billboard for Mid America Motorworks (an aftermarket parts supplier for classic Volkswagens and other vehicles) is seen in the background of the scene where Murphy attempts to sabotage Herbie. In addition, Volkswagen provided a Volkswagen Touareg and a Volkswagen New Beetle for use in certain scenes, General Motors also provided the 2005 Chevrolet Corvette and 2005 Pontiac GTO for use in race scenes as well. (Note: The 2004 Pontiac GTO was a rebadged, third-generation Holden Monaro.)

Various race cars in the Nextel Cup Series appear during the race at the end, with action sequences being filmed during the 2004 Target House 300 Busch Series race at California Speedway on September 4, 2004, and the 2004 Pop Secret 500 Cup Series race also at California Speedway on September 5, 2004. Dale Earnhardt Jr.'s No. 8 car is seen briefly, but it has all the Budweiser logos removed and replaced with his signature to avoid advertising alcohol in a children's film. In addition, billboards can be seen in straightaway scenes, some with the NEXTEL logo on them. Also, in the scene where Maggie pretends to drive a stock car in the junkyard, Dominic Toretto's 1970 Dodge Charger from The Fast and the Furious can be seen among the cars. KITT from the classic Knight Rider series also makes a cameo in the newspaper during the opening sequence. ABC Family aired a making-of featurette titled Herbie: Fully Loaded and Retooled, hosted by Lohan, on June 21, 2005, to promote the film release.

== Reception ==
=== Box office ===
In its opening weekend, the film grossed $12,709,221 in 3,521 theaters in the United States and Canada, ranking number four at the box office. By the end of its run, Herbie: Fully Loaded grossed $66,023,816 domestically and $78,123,000 internationally, totaling $144,146,816 worldwide.

=== Critical response ===
On Rotten Tomatoes, the film has an approval rating of 40% based on 141 reviews, with an average rating of 5.3/10. The site's critics consensus states that "Herbie: Fully Loaded is a decent kids movie that is pretty undemanding for adult viewers." The film, along with Herbie Goes Bananas, which also scored a 40% rating, is the lowest rated entry in the franchise. On Metacritic, it has a weighted average score of 47 out of 100 based on 31 critics, indicating "mixed or average" reviews. Audiences surveyed by CinemaScore gave the film an average grade "A" on an A+ to F scale.

Roger Ebert gave the film a two out of four stars, stating: "The movie is pretty cornball. Little kids would probably enjoy it, but their older brothers and sisters will be rolling their eyes, and their parents will be using their iPods." William Thomas of Empire gave the film a two out of five stars and said: "Every bit as good (and bad) as Herbie Goes Bananas; but the Love Bug deserves better performances."

=== Accolades ===
Organizations	Ceremony date	Category	Recipient(s)	Result	Ref.
Teen Choice Awards	August 16, 2005	Choice Summer Movie	Herbie: Fully Loaded	Nominated	
Teen Choice Awards	August 16, 2005	Choice Comedy Movie Actress	Lindsay Lohan	Nominated	
Smash Hits Poll Winners Party	November 20, 2005	Best Movie	Herbie: Fully Loaded	Nominated	
Smash Hits Poll Winners Party	November 20, 2005	Best Movie Star	Lindsay Lohan	Nominated	
Nickelodeon Kids' Choice Awards	April 1, 2006	Favorite Movie	Herbie: Fully Loaded	Nominated	
Nickelodeon Kids' Choice Awards	April 1, 2006	Favorite Movie Actress	Lindsay Lohan	Won	
Australian Kids' Choice Awards	October 11, 2006	Fave Movie Star	Lindsay Lohan	Nominated	

== Soundtrack ==
Herbie: Fully Loaded (Original Soundtrack)

Soundtrack album by Various artists
- Released: June 21, 2005
- Length: 52:40
- Label: Hollywood

Singles from Herbie: Fully Loaded
- 1. "First" Released: May 10, 2005

The soundtrack album was released on June 21, 2005. It includes Lohan's 2004 song "First", and remakes of classic songs by Hollywood Records artists including Aly & A.J., Caleigh Peters, Ingram Hill and Josh Kelley, and big names such as Lionel Richie and Mark McGrath. The album does not, however, contain any of Mark Mothersbaugh's original score for the film.

Despite most of the songs' original recordings appearing in the film itself, the soundtrack contains remakes only on the album. For example, the Beach Boys' original recording of "Getcha Back" is used for the film's opening credits, but the Mark McGrath cover is featured on the soundtrack.

The Girls Aloud single "Long Hot Summer" was planned to be included and put the British band into the American market, but was cut from the final film.

1. Lindsay Lohan – "First"
2. Mark McGrath – "Getcha Back" – The Beach Boys cover (1985)
3. Aly & AJ – "Walking on Sunshine" – Katrina and the Waves cover (1985)
4. Caleigh Peters – "Fun, Fun, Fun" – The Beach Boys cover (1964)
5. Pilot – "Magic"
6. Josh Gracin – "Working for the Weekend" – Loverboy cover (1981)
7. The Donnas – "Roll On Down the Highway" – Bachman–Turner Overdrive cover (1974)
8. The Mooney Suzuki – "Born to Be Wild" – Steppenwolf cover (1968)
9. Ingram Hill – "More Than a Feeling" – Boston cover (1976)
10. Rooney – "Metal Guru" – T. Rex cover (1972)
11. Josh Kelley – "You Are the Woman" – Firefall cover (1976)
12. Lionel Richie – "Hello"
13. Mavin – "Welcome to My World"
14. Black Smoke Organization – Herbie: Fully Loaded remix
15. Black Smoke Organization – "Herbie vs. NASCAR"

== See also ==
- Disney's Herbie: Fully Loaded, a video game loosely based on the film
