= List of comedy films of the 1980s =

A list of comedy films released in the 1980s.

Title	Director	Cast	Country	Subgenre/Notes
1980
9 to 5	Colin Higgins	Lily Tomlin, Dolly Parton, Jane Fonda, Dabney Coleman	United States	
Airplane!	Jim Abrahams, David Zucker, Jerry Zucker	Robert Hays, Julie Hagerty, Robert Stack, Leslie Nielsen, Peter Graves, Kareem Abdul-Jabbar, Lorna Patterson, Lloyd Bridges, Ethel Merman	United States	A spoof of disaster films
Any Which Way You Can	Buddy Van Horn	Clint Eastwood, Sondra Locke, Geoffrey Lewis, William Smith, Harry Guardino, Ruth Gordon, Barry Corbin	United States	
The Blues Brothers	John Landis	John Belushi, Dan Aykroyd, James Brown, Cab Calloway, Ray Charles, Carrie Fisher, Aretha Franklin, Henry Gibson, John Candy	United States	Musical-Comedy
Caddyshack	Harold Ramis	Chevy Chase, Rodney Dangerfield, Ted Knight, Michael O'Keefe, Bill Murray, Sarah Holcomb, Scott Colomby, Cindy Morgan, Dan Resin, Henry Wilcoxon, Elaine Aiken, Albert Salmi, Ann Ryerson, Brian Doyle-Murray, Hamilton Mitchell	United States	
Cheech and Chong's Next Movie	Tommy Chong	Cheech Marin, Tommy Chong, Evelyn Guerrero, Paul Reubens, Betty Kennedy, Sy Kramer, Rikki Marin, Edie McClurg, Bob McClurg, Michael Winslow	United States	
Fatso	Anne Bancroft	Dom DeLuise, Candice Azzara, Anne Bancroft, Ron Carey, David Comfort, Bob Curtis, Richard Karron, Michael Lombard, Ralph Manza	United States	
First Family	Buck Henry	Bob Newhart, Madeline Kahn, Gilda Radner, Richard Benjamin, Bob Dishy, Harvey Korman, Fred Willard, Rip Torn, Austin Pendleton	United States	
Gilda Live	Mike Nichols	Gilda Radner	United States	
The Gods Must Be Crazy	Jamie Uys	Nǃxau ǂToma, Sandra Prinsloo, Marius Weyers, Nic de Jager, Michael Thys, Louw Verwey, Ken Gampu Simon Sabela, Paddy O'Byrne	United States	
Gorp	Joseph Ruben	Michael Lembeck, Dennis Quaid, Fran Drescher, Rosanna Arquette, Philip Casnoff, Lisa Shure, David Huddleston, Robert Trebor, Lou Wagner	United States	
Herbie Goes Bananas	Vincent McEveety	Cloris Leachman, Charles Martin Smith, Stephan W. Burns, John Vernon, Elyssa Davalos, Joaquin Garay III, Harvey Korman	United States	
Hero at Large	Martin Davidson	John Ritter, Anne Archer, Bert Convy, Kevin McCarthy, Harry Bellaver, Anita Dangler, Jane Hallaren, Leonard Harris, Rick Podell	United States	
The Hollywood Knights	Floyd Mutrux	Robert Wuhl, Tony Danza, Fran Drescher, Leigh French, Glenn Withrow, Randy Gornel, Gary Graham, Sandy Helberg, James Jeter, Stuart Pankin, P.R. Paul, Michelle Pfeiffer, Gailard Sartain	United States	
Hopscotch	Ronald Neame	Walter Matthau, Glenda Jackson, Sam Waterston, Herbert Lom, Ned Beatty, David Matthau, George Baker	United States	
How to Beat the High Cost of Living	Robert Scheerer	Susan Saint James, Jane Curtin, Jessica Lange, Dabney Coleman	United States	
In God We Trust	Vincent McEveety	Cloris Leachman, Charles Martin Smith, Stephan W. Burns, John Vernon, Elyssa Davalos, Joaquin Garay III, Harvey Korman	United States	
The Last Married Couple in America	Vincent McEveety	Cloris Leachman, Charles Martin Smith, Stephan W. Burns, John Vernon, Elyssa Davalos, Joaquin Garay III, Harvey Korman	United States	
Melvin and Howard	Jonathan Demme	Paul Le Mat, Mary Steenburgen, Pamela Reed, Jason Robards	United States	Comedy-drama
Midnight Madness	Michael Nankin	David Naughton, Debra Clinger, Eddie Deezen, Brad Wilkin, Maggie Roswell, Stephen Furst	United States	
Oh, God! Book II	Gilbert Cates	George Burns, Suzanne Pleshette, David Birney, Louanne Sirota, John Louie, Wilfrid Hyde-White, Conrad Janis, Hans Conried	United States	
Oh! Heavenly Dog	Joe Camp	Chevy Chase, Jane Seymour, Omar Sharif, Robert Morley, Stuart Germain, Alan Sues, John Stride	United States	Fantasy Comedy
Popeye	Robert Altman	Robin Williams, Shelley Duvall, Paul L. Smith, Paul Dooley, Richard Libertini, Ray Walston, Wesley Ivan Hurt	United States	
Private Benjamin	Howard Zieff	Goldie Hawn, Eileen Brennan, Armand Assante, Robert Webber, Sam Wanamaker, Barbara Barrie, Mary Kay Place, Harry Dean Stanton, Albert Brooks, Richard Herd	United States	
The Private Eyes	Lang Elliott	Tim Conway, Don Knotts, Trisha Noble	United States	
Seems Like Old Times	Jay Sandrich	Chevy Chase, Goldie Hawn, Charles Grodin, Robert Guillaume, Yvonne Wilder, Harold Gould	United States	
Serial	Bill Persky	Martin Mull, Tuesday Weld, Jennifer McAllister, Sally Kellerman, Bill Macy, Pamela Bellwood, Peter Bonerz, Christopher Lee	United States	
Smokey and the Bandit II	Hal Needham	Burt Reynolds, Sally Field, Jackie Gleason, Dom Deluise, Jerry Reed, Pat McCormick	United States	
Stardust Memories	Woody Allen	Woody Allen, Charlotte Rampling, Jessica Harper, Marie-Christine Barrault, Tony Roberts	United States	
Stir Crazy	Sidney Poitier	Gene Wilder, Richard Pryor, Georg Stanford Brown, JoBeth Williams, Miguel Ángel Suárez, Craig T. Nelson, Barry Corbin, Charles Weldon, Nicolas Coster, Joel Brooks	United States	
Used Cars	Robert Zemeckis	Kurt Russell, Gerrit Graham, Frank McRae, Deborah Harmon, Joe Flaherty, David L. Lander, Michael McKean, Harry Northup, Woodrow Parfrey, Michael Talbott	United States	
Up the Academy	Robert Downey Sr.	Wendell Brown, Tommy Citera, Ron Leibman, Harry Teinowitz, Hutch Parker, Ralph Macchio, Tom Poston, King Coleman	United States	
Where the Buffalo Roam	Art Linson	Bill Murray, Peter Boyle, Bruno Kirby, René Auberjonois, R.G. Armstrong, Mark Metcalf	United States	
Wholly Moses!	Gary Weis	Dudley Moore, Laraine Newman, James Coco, Paul Sand, Jack Gilford, Dom DeLuise, John Houseman, Madeline Kahn, David L. Lander, Richard Pryor, John Ritter	United States	
1981
...All the Marbles	Robert Aldrich	Peter Falk, Vicki Frederick, Laurene Landon, Burt Young, Tracy Reed, John Hancock, Faith Minton, Chick Hearn	United States	Comedy-Drama
All Night Long	Jean-Claude Tramont	Gene Hackman, Barbra Streisand, Diane Ladd, Dennis Quaid, Kevin Dobson	United States	Romantic Comedy
Arthur	Steve Gordon	Dudley Moore, Liza Minnelli, John Gielgud, Geraldine Fitzgerald, Jill Eikenberry, Stephen Elliott, Ted Ross, Barney Martin, Thomas Barbour, Peter Evans, Anne De Salvo	United States	
Buddy Buddy	Billy Wilder	Jack Lemmon, Walter Matthau, Paula Prentiss, Klaus Kinski, Dana Elcar, Miles Chapin, Michael Ensign, Ben Lessy, Fil Formicola, C.J. Hunt	United States	
Bustin' Loose	Oz Scott	Richard Pryor, Cicely Tyson, Robert Christian, Alphonso Alexander, Kia Cooper, Edwin de Leon, Jimmy Hughes, Edwin Kinter, Tami Luchow, Angel Ramirez, Janet Wong, Nick Dimitri, Morgan Roberts	United States	
The Cannonball Run	Hal Needham	Burt Reynolds, Dom DeLuise, Roger Moore, Farrah Fawcett, Dean Martin, Sammy Davis Jr., Adrienne Barbeau, Jamie Farr, Terry Bradshaw, Mel Tillis, Jackie Chan	United States	Action-Comedy
Carbon Copy	Michael Schultz	George Segal, Denzel Washington, Susan Saint James, Jack Warden, Dick Martin, Paul Winfield, Macon McCalman	United States	
Caveman	Carl Gottlieb	Ringo Starr, Barbara Bach, Dennis Quaid, Shelley Long, John Matuszak, Avery Schreiber, Jack Gilford, Ed Greenberg, Cork Hubbert	United States	
Chu Chu and the Philly Flash	David Lowell Rich	Alan Arkin, Carol Burnett, Jack Warden, Ruth Buzzi, Adam Arkin, Danny Aiello, Danny Glover, Sid Haig	United States	
Continental Divide	Michael Apted	John Belushi, Blair Brown	United States	Comedy-Drama
The Devil and Max Devlin	Steven Hilliard Stern	Elliott Gould, Bill Cosby, Susan Anspach, Adam Rich, Julie Budd, Sonny Shroyer, David Knell, Chuck Shamata	United States	Fantasy-Comedy
Dirty Tricks	Alvin Rakoff	Elliott Gould, Kate Jackson, Rich Little, Arthur Hill, John Juliani, Alberta Watson, Mavor Moore, Nicholas Campbell, Michael McNamara, Martin McNamara, Cindy Girling	United States	
First Monday in October	Ronald Neame	Walter Matthau, Jill Clayburgh, Barnard Hughes, Jan Sterling, James Stephens, Joshua Bryant	United States	Comedy-Drama
Four Friends	Arthur Penn	Craig Wasson, Jodi Thelen, Michael Huddleston, Jim Metzler	United States	Comedy-Drama
The Four Seasons	Alan Alda	Alan Alda, Carol Burnett, Len Cariou, Sandy Dennis, Rita Moreno, Jack Weston, Bess Armstrong	United States	Comedy-Drama
Full Moon High	Larry Cohen	Adam Arkin, Ed McMahon, Roz Kelly, Joanne Nail, Bill Kirchenbauer, Kenneth Mars	United States	Horror Comedy
Going Ape!	Jeremy Joe Kronsberg	Tony Danza, Danny DeVito, Jessica Walter, Art Metrano, Frank Sivero, Rick Hurst, Howard Mann, Joseph Maher	United States	
The Great Muppet Caper	Jim Henson	Jim Henson, Frank Oz Dave Goelz, Jerry Nelson, Richard Hunt, Steve Whitmire, Charles Grodin, Diana Rigg, John Cleese, Robert Morley, Jack Warden	United States	
Hardly Working	Jerry Lewis	Jerry Lewis, Susan Oliver, Roger C. Carmel, Harold J. Stone, Steve Franken, Buddy Lester, Leonard Stone	United States	
Heartbeeps	Allan Arkush	Andy Kaufman, Bernadette Peters, Randy Quaid, Kenneth McMillan, Christopher Guest, Melanie Mayron	United States	Sci-fi Comedy
History of the World, Part I	Mel Brooks	Mel Brooks, Dom DeLuise, Madeline Kahn, Harvey Korman, Cloris Leachman, Ron Carey, Gregory Hines, Pamela Stephenson, Spike Milligan, Shecky Greene, Sid Caesar, Mary-Margaret Humes, Orson Welles, Hugh Hefner	United States	
The Incredible Shrinking Woman	Joel Schumacher	Lily Tomlin, Charles Grodin, Ned Beatty, Henry Gibson, Elizabeth Wilson, Mark Blankfield, John Glover	United States	
Modern Problems	Ken Shapiro	Chevy Chase, Patti D'Arbanville, Mary Kay Place, Brian Doyle-Murray, Nell Carter, Dabney Coleman	United States	
Modern Romance	Albert Brooks	Albert Brooks, Kathryn Harrold, Bruno Kirby, James L. Brooks, Jane Hallaren	United States	Romantic Comedy
Neighbors	John G. Avildsen	John Belushi, Dan Aykroyd, Cathy Moriarty, Kathryn Walker, Lauren-Marie Taylor	United States	
Nice Dreams	Tommy Chong	Cheech Marin, Tommy Chong, Stacy Keach, Peter Jason, Tim Rossovich, Paul Reubens, Evelyn Guerrero, Timothy Leary	United States	
Only When I Laugh	Glenn Jordan	Marsha Mason, Kristy McNichol, James Coco, Joan Hackett, David Dukes	United States	Comedy-Drama
On the Right Track	Lee Philips	Gary Coleman, Maureen Stapleton, Norman Fell, Michael Lembeck, Lisa Eilbacher, Bill Russell, Herb Edelman, Nathan Davis	United States	
Paternity	David Steinberg	Burt Reynolds, Beverly D'Angelo, Norman Fell, Paul Dooley, Elizabeth Ashley, Lauren Hutton, Juanita Moore, Peter Billingsley	United States	
Polyester	John Waters	Divine, Tab Hunter, Edith Massey, David Samson, Mary Garlington, Ken King, Mink Stole	United States	
Porky's	Bob Clark	Dan Monahan, Mark Herrier, Wyatt Knight, Cyril O'Reilly, Roger Wilson, Tony Ganios, Scott Colomby, Chuck Mitchell, Kaki Hunter, Nancy Parsons, Alex Karras, Susan Clark, Nancy Parsons, Kim Cattrall	United States	
Private Lessons	Alan Myerson	Sylvia Kristel, Howard Hesseman, Eric Brown, Patrick Piccininni, Ed Begley Jr., Pamela Bryant, Meridith Baer	United States	
Shock Treatment	Jim Sharman	Jessica Harper, Cliff DeYoung, Patricia Quinn, Richard O'Brien, Charles Gray, Little Nell	United States	Musical-Comedy
S.O.B.	Blake Edwards	Julie Andrews, William Holden, Richard Mulligan, Stuart Margolin, Larry Hagman, Robert Vaughn, Marisa Berenson, Robert Webber, Shelley Winters, Robert Preston	United States	
So Fine	Andrew Bergman	Ryan O'Neal, Jack Warden, Mariangela Melato, Richard Kiel, Fred Gwynne, Mike Kellin, David Rounds	United States	
Stripes	Ivan Reitman	Bill Murray, Harold Ramis, Warren Oates, P. J. Soles, John Candy, John Laroquette, Judge Reinhold	United States	
Student Bodies	Mickey Rose	Kristen Riter, Matt Goldsby, G. Chambers, Joe Flood, Joe Talarowski, Mimi Weddell, Dario Jones, Carl Jacobs, Peggy Cooper, Janice E. O'Malley, Kevin Mannis	United States	Horror Comedy
They All Laughed	Peter Bogdanovich	Ben Gazzara, Audrey Hepburn, John Ritter, Colleen Camp, Patti Hansen., Dorothy Stratten, George Morfogen, Blaine Novak, Sean Hepburn Ferrer	United States	Romantic Comedy
Under the Rainbow	Steve Rash	Chevy Chase, Carrie Fisher, Eve Arden, Joseph Maher, Robert Donner, Billy Barty	United States	
Waitress!	Lloyd Kaufman	Carol Drake, Jim Harris, Carol Bevar, Renata Majer, Hunt Block	United States	
1982
48 Hrs.	Walter Hill	Nick Nolte, Eddie Murphy, Annette O'Toole, Frank McRae, James Remar, David Patrick Kelly	United States	Action-Comedy
A Little Sex	Bruce Paltrow	Tim Matheson, Kate Capshaw, Edward Herrmann, John Glover, Joan Copeland, Susanna Dalton	United States	
A Midsummer Night's Sex Comedy	Woody Allen	Woody Allen, Mia Farrow, José Ferrer, Julie Hagerty, Tony Roberts, Mary Steenburgen, Adam Redfield, Moishe Rosenfeld, Timothy Jenkins, Michael Higgins	United States	
Airplane II: The Sequel	Ken Finkleman	Robert Hays, Julie Hagerty, Peter Graves, Lloyd Bridges, Chad Everett	United States	
Author! Author!	Arthur Hiller	Al Pacino, Dyan Cannon, Tuesday Weld, Alan King, Bob Dishy, Bob Elliott, Ray Goulding, Eric Gurry	United States	
Best Friends	Norman Jewison	Burt Reynolds, Goldie Hawn, Jessica Tandy, Barnard Hughes, Audra Lindley, Keenan Wynn, Ron Silver	United States	Romantic Comedy
Cannery Row	Walter Hill	Nick Nolte, Debra Winger, Audra Lindley, John Huston	United States	Comedy-Drama
Come Back to the 5 & Dime, Jimmy Dean, Jimmy Dean	Robert Altman	Sandy Dennis, Cher, Karen Black, Sudie Bond, Mark Patton, Kathy Bates	United States	Comedy-Drama
Dead Men Don't Wear Plaid	Carl Reiner	Steve Martin, Rachel Ward, George Gaynes, Reni Santoni, Adrian Ricard	United States	Mystery Comedy
Deathtrap	Sidney Lumet	Michael Caine, Christopher Reeve, Dyan Cannon, Irene Worth, Henry Jones, Joe Silver	United States	
Diner	Barry Levinson	Steve Guttenberg, Daniel Stern, Mickey Rourke, Kevin Bacon, Timothy Daly, Ellen Barkin	United States	Comedy-Drama
Eating Raoul	Paul Bartel	Mary Woronov, Paul Bartel, Robert Beltran, Ed Begley Jr., Buck Henry, Richard Paul, Susan Saiger	United States	
Fast Times at Ridgemont High	Amy Heckerling	Sean Penn, Jennifer Jason Leigh, Judge Reinhold, Phoebe Cates, Brian Backer, Robert Romanus, Ray Walston, Forest Whitaker, Nicolas Cage	United States	
Grease 2	Patricia Birch	Maxwell Caulfield, Michelle Pfeiffer, Adrian Zmed, Lorna Luft, Didi Conn, Eve Arden, Sid Caesar, Dody Goodman, Tab Hunter	United States	Musical-Comedy
Hanky Panky	Sidney Poitier	Gene Wilder, Gilda Radner, Kathleen Quinlan, Richard Widmark, Robert Prosky, Josef Sommer, Jay O. Sanders, Pat Corley	United States	
Human Highway	Neil Young	Russell Tamblyn, Dean Stockwell, Devo, Neil Young, Dennis Hopper, Sally Kirkland, Geraldine Baron, Charlotte Stewart	United States	
It Came from Hollywood	Malcolm Leo, Andrew Solt	Dan Aykroyd, John Candy, Cheech Marin, Tommy Chong, Gilda Radner	United States	
Jekyll and Hyde... Together Again	Jerry Belson	Mark Blankfield, Bess Armstrong, Krista Errickson, Tim Thomerson, Michael McGuire	United States	
Jimmy the Kid	Gary Nelson	Gary Coleman, Paul Le Mat, Ruth Gordon, Dee Wallace, Walter Olkewicz, Don Adams	United States	
Jinxed!	Don Siegel	Bette Midler, Ken Wahl, Rip Torn, Val Avery, Jack Elam, Benson Fong	United States	
Kiss Me Goodbye	Robert Mulligan	Sally Field, James Caan, Jeff Bridges, Paul Dooley, Claire Trevor, Stephen Elliott	United States	Romantic Comedy
The Last American Virgin	Boaz Davidson	Lawrence Monoson, Diane Franklin, Steve Antin, Joe Rubbo, Louisa Moritz, Brian Peck, Kimmy Robertson	United States	
Lookin' to Get Out	Hal Ashby	Jon Voight, Ann-Margret, Burt Young, Jude Ferrese, Allen Keller, Bert Remsen, Richard Bradford	United States	
My Favorite Year	Richard Benjamin	Peter O'Toole, Jessica Harper, Joseph Bologna, Mark Linn-Baker, Bill Macy, Adolph Green	United States	
National Lampoon's Movie Madness	Bob Giraldi, Henry Jaglom	Robby Benson, Richard Widmark, Diane Lane, Candy Clark, Christopher Lloyd, Peter Riegert, Ann Dusenberry	United States	
Neil Simon's I Ought to Be in Pictures	Herbert Ross	Dinah Manoff, Walter Matthau, Ann-Margret, Lance Guest, Larry Barton, Dan Butler	United States	Comedy-Drama
Night Shift	Ron Howard	Henry Winkler, Michael Keaton, Shelley Long, Gina Hecht, Pat Corley, Bobby Di Cicco	United States	
Pandemonium	Gary Nelson	Tom Smothers, Carol Kane, Judge Reinhold, Debralee Scott, Candice Azzara, Paul Reubens	United States	
Partners	James Burrows	Ryan O'Neal, John Hurt, Kenneth McMillan, Robyn Douglass, Jay Robinson, Denise Galik	United States	
Richard Pryor: Live on the Sunset Strip	Joe Layton	Richard Pryor	United States	
Six Pack	Daniel Petrie	Kenny Rogers, Diane Lane, Erin Gray, Barry Corbin, Terry Kiser Bob Hannah	United States	Comedy-Drama
Some Kind of Hero	Michael Pressman	Richard Pryor, Margot Kidder, Ray Sharkey, Ronny Cox, Sandy Ward, Lynne Moody	United States	
Soup for One	Jonathan Kaufer	Saul Rubinek, Marcia Strassman, Gerrit Graham, Richard Libertini, Andrea Martin, Lewis J. Stadlen	United States	
Summer Lovers	Randal Kleiser	Peter Gallagher, Daryl Hannah, Valérie Quennessen, Barbara Rush, Carole Cook	United States	Comedy-Drama
Tempest	Paul Mazursky	John Cassavetes, Gena Rowlands, Susan Sarandon, Vittorio Gassman, Raúl Juliá, Molly Ringwald	United States	Comedy-Drama
They Call Me Bruce?	Elliot Hong	Johnny Yune, Margaux Hemingway, Raf Mauro, Pam Huntington, Martin Azarow, Tony Brande, Bill Capizzi, Harvey Vernon	United States	Action-Comedy
Things Are Tough All Over	Thomas K. Avildsen	Cheech Marin, Tommy Chong, Evelyn Guerrero, John Steadman, George Wallace, Rip Taylor	United States	
Tootsie	Sydney Pollack	Dustin Hoffman, Jessica Lange, Teri Garr, Dabney Coleman, Bill Murray, Charles Durning	United States	
The Toy	Richard Donner	Richard Pryor, Jackie Gleason, Scott Schwartz, Teresa Ganzel, Wilfrid Hyde-White, Ned Beatty	United States	
Trail of the Pink Panther	Blake Edwards	Joanna Lumley, Herbert Lom, Richard Mulligan, André Maranne, Capucine, Robert Loggia, Burt Kwouk, Harvey Korman	United States	
Victor/Victoria	Blake Edwards	Julie Andrews, James Garner, Robert Preston, Lesley Ann Warren, Alex Karras	United States	Musical-Comedy
The World According to Garp	George Roy Hill	Robin Williams, Mary Beth Hurt, Glenn Close, John Lithgow, Hume Cronyn, Jessica Tandy, Peter Michael Goetz, Mark Soper	United States	Comedy-Drama
Wrong Is Right	Richard Brooks	Sean Connery, Robert Conrad, George Grizzard, Hardy Krüger, Ron Moody, Leslie Nielsen, Katharine Ross, John Saxon, Henry Silva, G. D. Spradlin, Robert Webber	United States	Comedy-Thriller
Yes, Giorgio	Franklin J. Schaffner	Luciano Pavarotti, Kathryn Harrold, Eddie Albert, Paola Borboni, James Hong, Beulah Quo	United States	Musical-Comedy
Zapped!	Robert J. Rosenthal	Scott Baio, Willie Aames, Felice Schachter, Heather Thomas, Robert Mandan, Greg Bradford, Scatman Crothers	United States	
1983
A Christmas Story	Bob Clark	Peter Billingsley, Jean Shepherd, Ian Petrella, Melinda Dillon, Darren McGavin	United States	
Baby It's You	John Sayles	Rosanna Arquette, Vincent Spano, Joanna Merlin, Jack Davidson, Liane Curtis	United States	Comedy-Drama
The Big Chill	Buddy Van Horn	Tom Berenger, Glenn Close, Jeff Goldblum, William Hurt, Kevin Kline, Mary Kay Place, Meg Tilly, JoBeth Williams, Don Galloway	United States	Comedy-Drama
Bill Cosby: Himself	Bill Cosby	Bill Cosby	United States	
Can She Bake a Cherry Pie?	Henry Jaglom	Karen Black, Michael Emil, Michael Margotta, Frances Fisher	United States	
Class	Lewis John Carlino	Rob Lowe, Jacqueline Bisset, Andrew McCarthy, Cliff Robertson, John Cusack, Rodney Pearson	United States	
Cracking Up	Jerry Lewis	Jerry Lewis, Herb Edelman, Zane Buzby, Milton Berle, Foster Brooks, Dick Butkus, Sammy Davis Jr., Buddy Lester	United States	
Curse of the Pink Panther	Blake Edwards	David Niven, Robert Wagner, Herbert Lom, Joanna Lumley, Capucine, Robert Loggia, Harvey Korman, Ted Wass	United States	
D.C. Cab	Joel Schumacher	Max Gail, Mr. T, Gary Busey, José Pérez, Paul Rodriguez, Adam Baldwin, Charlie Barnett, Anne De Salvo, Bill Maher	United States	
Deal of the Century	William Friedkin	Chevy Chase, Sigourney Weaver, Gregory Hines, Vince Edwards, Wallace Shawn, Richard Libertini	United States	
Doctor Detroit	Michael Pressman	Dan Aykroyd, Howard Hesseman, George Furth, James Brown, T. K. Carter, Donna Dixon, Fran Drescher, Lydia Lei, Lynn Whitfield	United States	
Easy Money	James Signorelli	Rodney Dangerfield, Joe Pesci, Geraldine Fitzgerald, Candy Azzara, Jennifer Jason Leigh, Jeffrey Jones, Taylor Negron, Tom Noonan, Val Avery, Tom Ewell	United States	
Get Crazy	Allan Arkush	Malcolm McDowell, Allen Garfield, Daniel Stern, Gail Edwards, Ed Begley Jr., Stacey Nelkin	United States	
Going Berserk	David Steinberg	John Candy, Joe Flaherty, Eugene Levy, Alley Mills, Pat Hingle, Ann Bronston, Elizabeth Kerr, Richard Libertini, Dixie Carter, Kurtwood Smith, Ronald E. House, Ernie Hudson	United States, Canada	
The King of Comedy	Martin Scorsese	Robert De Niro, Jerry Lewis, Sandra Bernhard, Diahnne Abbott, Shelley Hack, Margo Winkler	United States	
Local Hero	Bill Forsyth	Peter Riegert, Denis Lawson, Fulton Mackay, Burt Lancaster, Norman Chancer, Peter Capaldi	United States	
Losin' It	Curtis Hanson	Tom Cruise, Shelley Long, Jackie Earle Haley, John Stockwell, John P. Navin, Jr., Henry Darrow	United States	
Lovesick	Marshall Brickman	Dudley Moore, Elizabeth McGovern, John Huston, Alec Guinness, Wallace Shawn, Ron Silver, John Huston, Christine Baranski	United States	Romantic Comedy
The Man Who Loved Women	Blake Edwards	Burt Reynolds, Julie Andrews, Kim Basinger, Marilu Henner, Cynthia Sikes, Jennifer Edwards, Sela Ward, Denise Crosby, Ellen Bauer, Tracy Vaccaro, Barry Corbin	United States	
The Man Who Wasn't There	Bruce Malmuth	Steve Guttenberg, Jeffrey Tambor, Art Hindle, Morgan Hart, Lisa Langlois, William Forsythe, Bruce Malmuth	United States	
The Man with Two Brains	Carl Reiner	Steve Martin, Kathleen Turner, Sissy Spacek, David Warner Paul Benedict, George Furth, Peter Hobbs, Earl Boen	United States	
Max Dugan Returns	Herbert Ross	Marsha Mason, Donald Sutherland, Matthew Broderick, Dody Goodman	United States	Comedy-Drama
Mr. Mom	Stan Dragoti	Michael Keaton, Teri Garr, Taliesin Jaffe, Frederick Koehler, Martin Mull, Christopher Lloyd	United States	
My Tutor	George Bowers	Caren Kaye, Matt Lattanzi, Kevin McCarthy, Bruce Bauer, Clark Brandon, Arlene Golonka, Crispin Glover	United States	
National Lampoon's Vacation	Harold Ramis	Chevy Chase, Beverly D'Angelo, Anthony Michael Hall, Dana Barron, Imogene Coca, Randy Quaid, John Candy	United States	
Porky's II: The Next Day	Bob Clark	Dan Monahan, Wyatt Knight, Mark Herrier, Roger Wilson, Cyril O'Reilly, Tony Ganios, Kaki Hunter, Scott Colomby, Nancy Parsons	United States	
Private School	Jay Sandrich	Phoebe Cates, Betsy Russell, Matthew Modine, Michael Zorek, Ray Walston, Sylvia Kristel	United States	
Reuben, Reuben	Robert Ellis Miller	Tom Conti, Kelly McGillis	United States	Comedy-Drama
Richard Pryor: Here and Now	Richard Pryor	Richard Pryor	United States	
Risky Business	Paul Brickman	Tom Cruise, Rebecca De Mornay, Joe Pantoliano, Nicholas Pryor, Janet Carroll, Richard Masur, Bronson Pinchot	United States	
Romantic Comedy	Arthur Hiller	Dudley Moore, Mary Steenburgen, Frances Sternhagen, Janet Eilber Robyn Douglass, Ron Leibman	United States	Romantic Comedy
Screwballs	Rafal Zielinski	Peter Keleghan, Lynda Speciale, Linda Shayne, Kent Deuters	Canada	
Smokey and the Bandit Part 3	Dick Lowry	Jerry Reed, Jackie Gleason, Paul Williams, Pat McCormick, Mike Henry, Colleen Camp	United States	
Spring Break	Sean S. Cunningham	David Knell, Perry Lang, Paul Land, Steve Bassett	United States	
Still Smokin	Tommy Chong	Cheech Marin, Tommy Chong, Hans Man in 't Veld	United States	
The Sting II	Jeremy Paul Kagan	Jackie Gleason, Mac Davis, Ron Rifkin, John Hancock, Teri Garr, Oliver Reed	United States	
Strange Brew	Rick Moranis, Dave Thomas	Rick Moranis, Dave Thomas, Max von Sydow, Paul Dooley, Lynne Griffin	Canada	
Stroker Ace	Burt Reynolds,	Burt Reynolds, Ned Beatty, Jim Nabors, Parker Stevenson, Loni Anderson, John Byner	United States	Action-Comedy
The Survivors	Michael Ritchie	Walter Matthau, Robin Williams, Jerry Reed, James Wainwright, Kristen Vigard, Annie McEnroe, John Goodman	United States	
To Be or Not to Be	Alan Johnson	Mel Brooks, Anne Bancroft, Tim Matheson, Charles Durning, José Ferrer, George Gaynes, Christopher Lloyd, George Wyner	United States	
Trading Places	John Landis	Dan Aykroyd, Eddie Murphy, Ralph Bellamy, Don Ameche, Denholm Elliott, Jamie Lee Curtis, Jim Belushi	United States	
Trenchcoat	Michael Tuchner	Margot Kidder, Robert Hays, David Suchet, Gila von Weitershausen, Ronald Lacey, John Justin	United States	Action Comedy
Two of a Kind	John Herzfeld	John Travolta, Olivia Newton-John Oliver Reed, Scatman Crothers, Charles Durning	United States	Comedy-Drama
Valley Girl	Martha Coolidge	Nicolas Cage, Deborah Foreman, Elizabeth Daily, Cameron Dye, Michelle Meyrink, Lee Purcell, Richard Sanders, Colleen Camp	United States	Romantic Comedy
Yellowbeard	Mel Damski	Graham Chapman, Peter Boyle, Cheech Marin, Tommy Chong, Peter Cook, Marty Feldman, Martin Hewitt, Michael Hordern, Eric Idle, Madeline Kahn, James Mason, John Cleese	United States	
Zelig	Woody Allen	Woody Allen, Mia Farrow	United States	
1984
Beverly Hills Cop	Martin Brest	Eddie Murphy, Judge Reinhold, John Ashton, Lisa Eilbacher, Ronny Cox, Steven Berkoff, Bronson Pinchot	United States	Action Comedy
Broadway Danny Rose	Woody Allen	Woody Allen, Mia Farrow, Gerald Schoenfeld, Craig Vandenburgh, Herb Reynolds, Sandy Baron, Corbett Monica, Jackie Gayle, Morty Gunty, Will Jordan, Howard Storm, Gloria Parker	United States	
Ghostbusters	Ivan Reitman	Bill Murray, Dan Aykroyd, Harold Ramis, Ernie Hudson, Sigourney Weaver, Rick Moranis, Annie Potts, William Atherton, David Margulies, Steven Tash, Jennifer Runyon, Slavitza Jovan, Michael Ensign, Alice Drummond, Jordan Charney	United States	
Johnny Dangerously	Amy Heckerling	Michael Keaton, Griffin Dunne, Joe Piscopo, Marilu Henner, Maureen Stapleton, Peter Boyle, Glynnis O'Connor, Dom DeLuise, Richard Dimitri, Danny DeVito, Ron Carey	United States	
The Lonely Guy	Arthur Hiller	Steve Martin, Charles Grodin, Judith Ivey, Steve Lawrence, Robyn Douglass, Merv Griffin	United States	
The Muppets Take Manhattan	Frank Oz	Jim Henson, Frank Oz, Dave Goelz, Steve Whitmire, Richard Hunt, Jerry Nelson, Art Carney, James Coco, Dabney Coleman, Linda Lavin, Joan Rivers, Gregory Hines	United States	
No Small Affair	Jerry Schatzberg	Jon Cryer, Demi Moore, George Wendt, Peter Frechette, E. G. Daily, Ann Wedgeworth, Jeffrey Tambor, Tim Robbins, Hamilton Camp	United States	
Oh, God! You Devil	Paul Bogart	George Burns, Ted Wass, Ron Silver, Roxanne Hart, Eugene Roche, Janet Brandt	United States	
Police Academy	Hugh Wilson	Steve Guttenberg, Kim Cattrall, Bubba Smith, Michael Winslow, George Gaynes, G. W. Bailey, Leslie Easterbrook, Donovan Scott, Andrew Rubin, David Graf, Bruce Mahler, Marion Ramsey, Brant von Hoffman, Scott Thomson	United States	
Repo Man	Alex Cox	Emilio Estevez, Harry Dean Stanton, Tracey Walter	United States	Sci-fi Comedy
Revenge of the Nerds	Jeff Kanew	Robert Carradine, Anthony Edwards, Ted McGinley, Julia Montgomery, Timothy Busfield, Andrew Cassese, Curtis Armstrong, Larry B. Scott, Brian Tochi, Michelle Meyrink, Matt Salinger, Donald Gibb, James Cromwell, David Wohl, John Goodman, Bernie Casey	United States	
Romancing the Stone	Robert Zemeckis	Kathleen Turner, Michael Douglas, Danny DeVito, Zack Norman, Alfonso Arau, Manuel Ojeda	United States	
Sixteen Candles	John Hughes	Molly Ringwald, Anthony Michael Hall, Michael Schoeffling, Carlin Glynn, Blanche Baker, Justin Henry, Haviland Morris, Gedde Watanabe, Paul Dooley	United States	
Splash	Ron Howard	Tom Hanks, Daryl Hannah, John Candy, Eugene Levy	United States	Fantasy Comedy
This is Spinal Tap	Rob Reiner	Michael McKean, Christopher Guest, Harry Shearer, Rob Reiner, Tony Hendra, Fran Drescher	United States	
Top Secret!	Jim Abrahams, David Zucker, Jerry Zucker	Val Kilmer, Lucy Gutteridge, Omar Sharif, Peter Cushing, Michael Gough	United States	
The Woman in Red	Gene Wilder	Gene Wilder, Kelly LeBrock, Gilda Radner, Charles Grodin, Joseph Bologna, Judith Ivey	United States	
1985
After Hours	Martin Scorsese	Griffin Dunne, Rosanna Arquette, Verna Bloom, Teri Garr, Linda Fiorentino, John Heard, Catherine O'Hara, Bronson Pinchot, Cheech Marin, Tommy Chong	United States	
Back to the Future	Robert Zemeckis	Michael J. Fox, Christopher Lloyd, Lea Thompson, Crispin Glover, Thomas F. Wilson, Claudia Wells, Marc McClure, Wendie Jo Sperber, George DiCenzo, Frances Lee McCain, James Tolkan, J. J. Cohen, Casey Siemaszko, Billy Zane, Harry Waters, Jr.	United States	Sc-fi Comedy
Clue	Jonathan Lynn	Tim Curry, Madeline Kahn, Christopher Lloyd, Eileen Brennan, Martin Mull, Lesley Ann Warren, Colleen Camp, Michael McKean	United States	Mystery Comedy
Fletch	Michael Ritchie	Chevy Chase, Tim Matheson, Joe Don Baker, Dana Wheeler-Nicholson, Richard Libertini, M. Emmet Walsh, George Wendt, Kenneth Mars, Geena Davis, Kareem Abdul-Jabbar	United States	
The Goonies	Richard Donner	Sean Astin, Josh Brolin, Jeff Cohen, Corey Feldman, Kerri Green, Martha Plimpton, Ke Huy Quan, John Mutuszak, Robert Davi, Joe Pantoliano, Anne Ramsey, Lupe Ontiveros, Mary Ellen Trainor, Keith Walker, Curtis Hanson	United States	
The Jewel of the Nile	Lewis Teague	Michael Douglas, Kathleen Turner, Danny DeVito, Spiros Focás, Avner Eisenberg, Hamid Fillali, Daniel Peacock, Holland Taylor, Guy Cuevas, The Flying Karamazov Brothers	United States	
Lost in America	Albert Brooks	Albert Brooks, Julie Hagerty, Michael Greene, Tom Tarpey, Garry Marshall	United States	
Once Bitten	Howard Storm	Jim Carrey, Lauren Hutton, Cleavon Little	United States	Horror Comedy
Pee-wee's Big Adventure	Tim Burton	Paul Reubens, Elizabeth Daily, Mark Holton, Diane Salinger, Judd Omen, Irving Hellman, Monte Landis, Damon Martin, David Glasser, Gregory Brown, Mark Everett, Daryl Roach, Bill Cable, Peter Looney, Starletta DuPois	United States	
The Purple Rose of Cairo	Woody Allen	Mia Farrow, Jeff Daniels, Danny Aiello, Edward Herrmann, John Wood, Deborah Rush, Zoe Caldwell, Dianne Wiest, Paul Herman, Van Johnson	United States	Fantasy Comedy
Summer Rental	Carl Reiner	John Candy, Karen Austin, Kerri Green, Joey Lawrence, Rip Torn, Richard Crenna	United States	
Teen Wolf	Rod Daniel	Michael J. Fox, James Hampton, Scott Paulin, Susan Ursitti, Jerry Levine, Jay Tarses	United States	
Weird Science	John Hughes	Ilan Mitchell-Smith, Anthony Michael Hall, Kelly LeBrock, Bill Paxton	United States	Sci-fi Fantasy Comedy
1986
Back to School	Alan Metter	Rodney Dangerfield, Burt Young, Sally Kellerman, Keith Gordon, Adrienne Barbeau, Robert Downey Jr. Sam Kinison, Ned Beatty	United States	
Crocodile Dundee	Peter Faiman	Paul Hogan, Linda Kozlowski, Mark Blum, David Gulpilil, Michael Lombard, John Meillon, Reginald VelJohnson, Terry Gill, Steve Rackman, Gerry Skilton, Caitlin Clarke	United States	
Down and Out in Beverly Hills	Paul Mazursky	Nick Nolte, Bette Midler, Richard Dreyfuss, Elizabeth Peña, Little Richard, Evan Richards, Tracy Nelson, Felton Perry	United States	
Ferris Bueller's Day Off	John Hughes	Matthew Broderick, Mia Sara, Alan Ruck, Jennifer Grey, Jeffrey Jones, Cindy Pickett, Lyman Ward, Charlie Sheen, Edie McClurg, Ben Stein	United States	
The Golden Child	Michael Ritchie	Eddie Murphy, Charles Dance, Charlotte Lewis, Victor Wong, J. L. Reate, Randall "Tex" Cobb, James Hong, Tiger Chung Lee	United States	Fantasy Comedy
Hannah and Her Sisters	Woody Allen	Mia Farrow, Carrie Fisher, Barbara Hershey, Woody Allen, Michael Caine, Lloyd Nolan, Maureen O'Sullivan, Daniel Stern, Max Von Sydow, Dianne Wiest	United States	Comedy-Drama
Little Shop of Horrors	Frank Oz	Rick Moranis, Ellen Greene, Levi Stubbs, Vincent Gardenia, Tichina Arnold, Michelle Weeks, Tisha Campbell, Steve Martin, Jim Belushi, Bill Murray, John Candy	United States	Musical-Comedy
Lucas	David Seltzer	Corey Haim, Kerri Green, Courtney Thorne-Smith, Charlie Sheen, Winona Ryder, Ciro Poppiti, Tom Hodges, Guy Boyd	United States	Comedy-Drama
Peggy Sue Got Married	Francis Ford Coppola	Kathleen Turner, Nicolas Cage, Barry Miller, Catherine Hicks, Joan Allen, Kevin J. O'Connor, Lisa Jane Persky, Jim Carrey	United States	Comedy-Drama
Ruthless People	Jim Abrahams, David Zucker, Jerry Zucker	Danny DeVito, Bette Midler, Judge Reinhold, Helen Slater, Bill Pullman, Art Evans	United States	
Short Circuit	John Badham	Tim Blaney, Ally Sheedy, Steve Guttenberg, Fisher Stevens, Austin Pendleton, G. W. Bailey	United States	Sci-fi Comedy
Something Wild	Jonathan Demme	Jeff Daniels, Melanie Griffith, Ray Liotta, Margaret Colin, Tracey Walter, Dana Preu, Jack Gilpin	United States	
Three Amigos	John Landis	Steve Martin, Chevy Chase, Martin Short, Alfonso Arau, Tony Plana, Patrice Martinez, Joe Mantegna, Phil Hartman, Jon Lovitz, Tino Insana	United States	Western Comedy
Wildcats	Michael Ritchie	Goldie Hawn, James Keach, Swoosie Kurtz, Nipsey Russell, Bruce McGill, M. Emmet Walsh, Mykelti Williamson, Nick Corri, Robyn Lively, Brandy Gold, George Wyner, Wesley Snipes, Woody Harrelson, Bruce French, Jan Hooks, Tab Thacker	United States	
Wise Guys	Brian De Palma	Joe Piscopo, Danny DeVito, Harvey Keitel, Ray Sharkey, Dan Hedaya, Lou Albano, Julie Bovasso, Patti LuPone, Antonia Rey, Mimi Cecchini, Matthew Kaye	United States	
1987
Adventures in Babysitting	Chris Columbus	Elisabeth Shue, Keith Coogan, Anthony Rapp, Maia Brewton, Penelope Ann Miller, Bradley Whitford, Calvin Levels, George Newbern, John Chandler	United States	
Baby Boom	Charles Shyer	Diane Keaton, Harold Ramis, Sam Wanamaker, Sam Shepard, James Spader, Pat Hingle, Britt Leach	United States	
Beverly Hills Cop II	Paul Mazursky	Eddie Murphy, Judge Reinhold, John Ashton, Brigitte Nielsen, Jürgen Prochnow, Ronny Cox, Allen Garfield	United States	Action Comedy
Broadcast News	James L. Brooks	Holly Hunter, Albert Brooks, William Hurt, Robert Prosky, Lois Chiles, Peter Hackes, Christian Clemenson, Jack Nicholson	United States	Comedy-Drama
Dragnet	Tom Mankiewicz	Dan Aykroyd, Tom Hanks, Christopher Plummer, Harry Morgan, Alexandra Paul, Jack O'Halloran, Elizabeth Ashley, Dabney Coleman	United States	
Ernest Goes to Camp	John Cherry	Jim Varney, Victoria Racimo, Scott Menville, Jacob Vargas, Danny Capri, Hakim Abdulsamad, Todd Loyd, Gailard Sartain, Daniel Butler John Vernon	United States	
Good Morning, Vietnam	Barry Levinson	Robin Williams, Forest Whitaker, Bruno Kirby, Tung Thanh Tran, Chintara Sukapatana, Robert Wuhl	United States	
Harry and the Hendersons	William Dear	John Lithgow, Melinda Dillon, Margaret Langrick, Joshua Rudoy, Kevin Peter Hall, Fred Newman, Lainie Kazan, Don Ameche	United States	
Hunk	Lawrence Bassoff	John Allen Nelson, Steve Levitt, James Coco, David Kurtz	United States	A Faustian comedy
Ishtar	Elaine May	Warren Beatty, Dustin Hoffman, Isabelle Adjani, Charles Grodin, Jack Weston, Fred Melamed, Tess Harper, Carol Kane	United States	
Leonard Part 6	Paul Weiland	Bill Cosby, Tom Courtenay, Joe Don Baker, Moses Gunn, Gloria Foster, Pat Colbert	United States	
Overboard	Garry Marshall	Goldie Hawn, Kurt Russell, Jeffrey Wiseman, Jared Rushton, Brian Price, Jamie Wild, Edward Herrmann, Katherine Helmond, Roddy McDowall	United States	
Planes, Trains and Automobiles	John Hughes	Steve Martin, John Candy, Laila Robins, Olivia Burnette, Matthew Lawrence, Carol Bruce, George O. Petrie, Dylan Baker, Michael McKean	United States	
The Princess Bride	Rob Reiner	Cary Elwes, Mandy Patinkin, Chris Sarandon, Christopher Guest, Wallace Shawn, André the Giant, Robin Wright, Peter Falk, Billy Crystal, Carol Kane	United States	Fantasy Comedy
Raising Arizona	Joel Coen	Nicolas Cage, Holly Hunter, T.J. Kuhn, Jr. Trey Wilson, John Goodman, william Forsythe, Sam McMurray, Frances McDormand, Randall "Tex" Cobb	United States	
Roxanne	Fred Schepisi	Steve Martin, Daryl Hannah, Shelley Duvall, Rick Rossovich, Fred Willard, Michael J. Pollard, John Kapelos, Max Alexander	United States	Romantic Comedy
The Secret of My Success	Herbert Ross	Michael J. Fox, Helen Slater, Richard Jordan, Margaret Whitton, John Pankow, Fred Gwynne, Gerry Bamman, Carol Ann Susi, Drew Snyder, Elizabeth Franz, Mercedes Ruehl, Bill Fagerbakke	United States	
Spaceballs	Mel Brooks	Mel Brooks, Rick Moranis, Bill Pullman, Daphne Zuniga, John Candy, George Wyner, Joan Rivers, Dick Van Patten, Michael Winslow, Lorene Yarnell, John Hurt, Sal Viscuso, Ronny Graham, Jim J. Bullock, Leslie Bevis	United States	A parody of Star Wars
Stakeout	John Badham	Richard Dreyfuss, Emilio Estevez, Aidan Quinn, Madeleine Stowe, Forest Whitaker, Dan Lauria, Earl Billings, Ian Tracey, Jackson Davies, Don S. Davis	United States	Action Comedy
Three Men and a Baby	Leonard Nimoy	Tom Selleck, Steve Guttenberg, Ted Danson, Michelle and Lisa Blair, Margaret Colin, Celeste Holm, Nancy Travis, Alexandra Amini, Philip Bosco, Paul Guilfoyle, Earl Hindman, Barbara Budd	United States	
Throw Momma from the Train	Danny DeVito	Danny DeVito, Billy Crystal, Anne Ramsey, Kim Greist, Kate Mulgrew, Branford Marsalis, Rob Reiner	United States	
The Witches of Eastwick	George Miller	Jack Nicholson, Cher, Susan Sarandon, Michelle Pfeiffer, Veronica Cartwright, Richard Jenkins, Carel Struycken	United States	Fantasy Comedy
1988
A Fish Called Wanda	Charles Crichton	John Cleese, Jamie Lee Curtis, Kevin Kline, Michael Palin, Maria Aitken, Tom Georgeson, Patricia Hayes	United States, United Kingdom	
Beetlejuice	Tim Burton	Michael Keaton, Alec Baldwin, Geena Davis, Winona Ryder, Catherine O'Hara, Jeffrey Jones, Robert Goulet, Dick Cavett, Annie McEnroe, Sylvia Sidney, Glenn Shadix, Patrice Martinez, Maree Cheatham	United States	
Big	Penny Marshall	Tom Hanks, David Moscow, Elizabeth Perkins, Jared Rushton, John Heard, Robert Loggia, Mercedes Ruehl, Jon Lovitz	United States	Fantasy Comedy
Bull Durham	Ron Shelton	Kevin Costner, Susan Sarandon, Tim Robbins, Trey Wilson, Robert Wuhl, William O'Leary	United States	
Coming to America	John Landis	Eddie Murphy, Arsenio Hall, Shari Headley, James Earl Jones, John Amos, Madge Sinclair, Louie Anderson, Samuel L. Jackson	United States	
Crocodile Dundee II	John Cornell	Paul Hogan, Linda Kozlowski, John Meillon, Hechter Ubarry, Juan Fernández de Alarcón, Charles S. Dutton	United States	
Dirty Rotten Scoundrels	Frank Oz	Steve Martin, Michael Caine, Glenne Headly, Anton Rodgers, Barbara Harris, Ian McDiarmid, Dana Ivey	United States	
Ernest Saves Christmas	John Cherry	Jim Varney, Douglas Seale, Noelle Parker, Oliver Clark, Gailard Sartain, Bill Byrge, Billie Bird, Robert Lesser, Buddy Douglas, Patty Maloney, Lindsey Alley	United States	
Funny Farm	George Roy Hill	Chevy Chase, Madolyn Smith, Joseph Maher, Kevin O'Morrison, Jack Gilpin, Alice Drummond, Brad Sullivan, MacIntyre Dixon, Mike Starr, Glenn Plummer	United States	
Hairspray	John Waters	Ricki Lake, Sonny Bono, Ruth Brown, Divine, Debbie Harry, Jerry Stiller, Ric Ocasek, Pia Zadora	United States	Musical-Comedy
I'm Gonna Git You Sucka	Keenan Ivory Wayans	Keenen Ivory Wayans, Bernie Casey, Antonio Fargas, Isaac Hayes, Jim Brown, Ja'net Dubois, Steve James, John Vernon, Dawnn Lewis, Kadeem Hardison, Damon Wayans, Kim Wayans, Nadia Wayans, Chris Rock, Anne-Marie Johnson, Eve Plumb, Tony Cox	United States	
Midnight Run	Martin Brest	Robert De Niro, Charles Grodin, Yaphet Kotto, John Ashton, Dennis Farina, Joe Pantoliano, Richard Foronjy	United States	
The Naked Gun: From the Files of Police Squad!	David Zucker	Leslie Nielsen, Priscilla Presley, Ricardo Montalbán, George Kennedy, O.J. Simpson, Nancy Marchand, Jeannette Charles, Raye Birk	United States	
Scrooged	Richard Donner	Bill Murray, Karen Allen, John Forsythe, Bobcat Goldthwait, David Johansen, Carol Kane, Robert Mitchum, Michael J. Pollard, Alfre Woodard	United States	
Short Circuit 2	Kenneth Johnson	Tim Blaney, Fisher Stevens, Michael McKean, Cynthia Gibb, Jack Weston, David Hemblen, Dee McCafferty	United States	Sci-fi Comedy
Twins	Ivan Reitman	Arnold Schwarzenegger, Danny DeVito, Kelly Preston, Chloe Webb, Bonnie Bartlett, Tony Jay	United States	
Who Framed Roger Rabbit	Robert Zemeckis	Bob Hoskins, Charles Fleischer, Kathleen Turner, Christopher Lloyd, Stubby Kaye, Joanna Cassidy, Alan Tilvern, Lou Hirsch, David Lander, Fred Newman, June Foray, Mel Blanc, Joe Alaskey, Wayne Allwine, Tony Anselmo, Tony Pope, Mae Questel	United States	Fantasy Comedy
Working Girl	Mike Nichols	Melanie Griffith, Harrison Ford, Sigourney Weaver, Alec Baldwin, Joan Cusack, Philip Bosco, Zach Grenier, Nora Dunn, Oliver Platt, Kevin Spacey	United States	Comedy-Drama
1989
Back to the Future Part II	Robert Zemeckis	Michael J. Fox, Christopher Lloyd, Lea Thompson, Thomas F. Wilson, Elisabeth Shue, James Tolkan, Jeffrey Weissman, Casey Siemaszko, Billy Zane, J.J. Cohen, Charles Fleischer, E. Casanova Evans, Jay Koch, Charles Gherardi, Ricky Dean Logan	United States	Sci-fi Comedy
Bill and Ted's Excellent Adventure	Stephen Herek	Alex Winter, Keanu Reeves, George Carlin, Terry Camilleri, Dan Shor, Tony Steedman, Rod Loomis, Al Leong, Jane Wiedlin	United States	
Crimes and Misdemeanors	Woody Allen	Alan Alda, Woody Allen, Martin Landau, Mia Farrow, Anjelica Huston, Jerry Orbach	United States	Comedy-Drama
The Fabulous Baker Boys	Steve Kloves	Jeff Bridges, Michelle Pfeiffer, Beau Bridges	United States	Comedy-Drama
Fletch Lives	Michael Ritchie	Chevy Chase, Hal Holbrook, Julianne Phillips, R. Lee Ermey, Richard Libertini, Cleavon Little	United States	
Ghostbusters II	Ivan Reitman	Bill Murray, Dan Aykroyd, Harold Ramis, Ernie Hudson, Sigourney Weaver, Rick Moranis, Annie Potts, Peter MacNicol, Harris Yulin, David Margulies, Kurt Fuller, Janet Margolin, Cheech Marin	United States	
Heathers	Michael Lehmann	Winona Ryder, Christian Slater, Shannen Doherty, Lisanne Falk, Kim Walker, Penelope Milford, Glenn Shadix	United States	
Honey, I Shrunk the Kids	Joe Johnston	Rick Moranis, Marcia Strassman, Amy O'Neill, Robert Oliveri, Matt Frewer, Kristine Sutherland, Thomas Wilson, Jared Rushton, Mark L. Taylor	United States	Sci-fi Comedy
Look Who's Talking	Amy Heckerling	Kirstie Alley, Bruce Willis, John Travolta, Olympia Dukakis, George Segal, Abe Vigoda	United States	
Major League	David S. Ward	Tom Berenger, Charlie Sheen, Corbin Bernsen, Wesley Snipes, Margaret Whitton, James Gammon, Rene Russo, Bob Uecker, Charles Cyphers, Chelcie Ross, Dennis Haysbert	United States	
National Lampoon's Christmas Vacation	Jeremiah S. Chechik	Chevy Chase, Beverly D'Angelo, Juliette Lewis, Johnny Galecki, Randy Quaid, John Randolph, Diane Ladd, E. G. Marshall, Doris Roberts, Miriam Flynn, Cody Burger, Ellen Hamilton, William Hickey, Mae Questel, Julia Louis-Dreyfus, Brian Doyle-Murray	United States	
Parenthood	Ron Howard	Steve Martin, Tom Hulce, Rick Moranis, Martha Plimpton, Keanu Reeves, Jason Robards, Mary Steenburgen, Dianne Wiest	United States	Comedy-Drama
Say Anything...	Cameron Crowe	John Cusack, Ione Skye, John Mahoney, Lili Taylor, Amy Brooks, Pamela Segall, Jason Gould, Loren Dean, Glenn Walker Harris Jr., Polly Platt	United States	Comedy-Drama
Steel Magnolias	Herbert Ross	Sally Field, Julia Roberts, Dolly Parton, Shirley MacLaine, Olympia Dukakis, Daryl Hannah, Tom Skerritt, Sam Shepard, Dylan McDermott, Kevin J. O'Connor	United States	Comedy-Drama
Troop Beverly Hills	Jeff Kanew	Shelley Long, Craig T. Nelson, Betty Thomas, Mary Gross, Stephanie Beacham, Audra Lindley, Edd Byrnes, Ami Foster, Carla Gugino, Kellie Martin, Emily Schulman, Tasha Scott, Jenny Lewis, David Gautreaux, Tori Spelling	United States	
Turner & Hooch	Roger Spottiswoode	Tom Hanks, Mare Winningham, Craig T. Nelson, Reginald VelJohnson, Scott Paulin, J. C. Quinn, John McIntire, David Knell, Ebbe Roe Smith	United States	
UHF	Jay Levey	"Weird Al" Yankovic, Kevin McCarthy, Michael Richards, Fran Drescher, David Bowe, Victoria Jackson	United States	
Uncle Buck	John Hughes	John Candy, Jean Louisa Kelly, Gaby Hoffmann, Macaulay Culkin, Amy Madigan, Elaine Bromka, Garrett M. Brown, Laurie Metcalf, Jay Underwood	United States	
The War of the Roses	Danny DeVito	Michael Douglas, Kathleen Turner, Danny DeVito, Dan Castellaneta, Marianne Sägebrecht, Sean Astin, G. D. Spradlin, Peter Donat	United States	
Weekend at Bernie's	Ted Kotcheff	Andrew McCarthy, Jonathan Silverman, Terry Kiser, Catherine Mary Stewart, Don Calfa	United States	
When Harry Met Sally...	Rob Reiner	Billy Crystal, Meg Ryan, Carrie Fisher, Bruno Kirby, Steven Ford, Lisa Jane Persky, Michelle Nicastro	United States	Romantic Comedy

== 1980s ==
=== 1980 ===
- Airplane!
- Animalympics
- Any Which Way You Can
- The Blues Brothers
- Bon Voyage, Charlie Brown (and Don't Come Back!!)
- Caddyshack
- Can't Stop the Music
- Cheech and Chong's Next Movie
- Fatso
- First Family
- Galaxina
- Gilda Live
- The Gods Must Be Crazy
- Gorp
- Herbie Goes Bananas
- Hero at Large
- The Hollywood Knights
- Hopscotch
- How to Beat the High Co$t of Living
- In God We Tru$t
- The Last Married Couple in America
- Little Darlings
- Melvin and Howard
- Midnight Madness
- Nine to Five
- The Nude Bomb
- Oh, God! Book II
- Oh! Heavenly Dog
- Popeye
- Pray TV
- Private Benjamin
- The Private Eyes
- Seems Like Old Times
- Serial
- Smokey and the Bandit II
- Stardust Memories
- Stir Crazy
- The Stunt Man
- Sunday Lovers
- Used Cars
- Up the Academy
- Where the Buffalo Roam
- Wholly Moses!

=== 1981 ===
- ...All the Marbles
- All Night Long
- All the Marbles
- An American Werewolf in London
- Arthur
- Buddy Buddy
- Bustin' Loose
- The Cannonball Run
- Carbon Copy
- Caveman
- Chu Chu and the Philly Flash
- Condorman
- Continental Divide
- The Devil and Max Devlin
- Dirty Tricks
- First Monday in October
- Four Friends
- The Four Seasons
- Full Moon High
- Going Ape!
- The Great Muppet Caper
- Hardly Working
- The Harlem Globetrotters on Gilligan's Island
- Heartbeeps
- History of the World, Part I
- The Incredible Shrinking Woman
- The Looney Looney Looney Bugs Bunny Movie
- Modern Problems
- Modern Romance
- My Dinner with Andre
- Neighbors
- Nice Dreams
- Only When I Laugh
- On the Right Track
- Paternity
- Polyester
- Porky's
- Private Lessons
- Shock Treatment
- S.O.B.
- So Fine
- Stripes
- Student Bodies
- Take This Job and Shove It
- They All Laughed
- Under the Rainbow
- Waitress!
- Zorro, The Gay Blade

=== 1982 ===
- 48 Hours
- A Little Sex
- A Midsummer Night's Sex Comedy
- Airplane II: The Sequel
- Annie
- Author! Author!
- Best Friends
- Bugs Bunny's 3rd Movie: 1001 Rabbit Tales
- Cannery Row
- Come Back to the 5 & Dime, Jimmy Dean, Jimmy Dean
- Creepshow
- Dead Men Don't Wear Plaid
- Deathtrap
- Diner
- Eating Raoul
- Fast Times at Ridgemont High
- Grease 2
- Hanky Panky
- Hey Good Lookin'
- Honkytonk Man
- Human Highway
- It Came From Hollywood
- Jekyll and Hyde... Together Again
- Jimmy the Kid
- Jinxed!
- The Junkman
- Kiss Me Goodbye
- The Last American Virgin
- Lookin' to Get Out
- My Favorite Year
- National Lampoon's Movie Madness
- Neil Simon's I Ought to Be in Pictures
- Night Shift
- Pandemonium
- Partners
- The Pirate Movie
- Richard Pryor: Live on the Sunset Strip
- Six Pack
- Some Kind of Hero
- Soup for One
- Summer Lovers
- Tempest
- They Call Me Bruce?
- Things Are Tough All Over
- Tootsie
- The Toy
- Trail of the Pink Panther
- Victor Victoria
- The World According to Garp
- Wrong Is Right
- Yes, Giorgio
- Young Doctors in Love
- Zapped!

=== 1983 ===
- A Christmas Story
- Baby It's You
- Better Late Than Never
- The Big Chill
- Bill Cosby: Himself
- Can She Bake a Cherry Pie?
- Class
- Cracking Up
- Curse of the Pink Panther
- Daffy Duck's Fantastic Island
- D.C. Cab
- Deal of the Century
- Doctor Detroit
- Easy Money
- Get Crazy
- Going Berserk
- The King of Comedy
- Local Hero
- Losin' It
- Lovesick
- The Man Who Loved Women
- The Man Who Wasn't There
- The Man With Two Brains
- Max Dugan Returns
- Mr. Mom
- My Tutor
- National Lampoon's Vacation
- Porky's II: The Next Day
- Private School
- Reuben, Reuben
- Richard Pryor: Here and Now
- Risky Business
- Romantic Comedy
- Screwballs
- Smokey and the Bandit Part 3
- Spring Break
- Still Smokin
- The Sting II
- Strange Brew
- Stroker Ace
- The Survivors
- To Be or Not to Be
- Trading Places
- Trenchcoat
- Twice Upon a Time
- Two of a Kind
- Valley Girl
- Yellowbeard
- Zelig

=== 1984 ===
- 16 Candles
- The Adventures of Buckaroo Banzai Across the 8th Dimension
- All of Me
- American Dreamer
- Bachelor Party
- Best Defense
- Beverly Hills Cop
- Blame It on Rio
- Broadway Danny Rose
- The Buddy System
- Cannonball Run II
- Cheech & Chong's The Corsican Brothers
- City Heat
- Crackers
- Electric Dreams
- Finders Keepers
- The Flamingo Kid
- Ghostbusters
- Grandview, U.S.A.
- Gremlins
- The Hotel New Hampshire
- Hot Dog…The Movie
- The Ice Pirates
- Irreconcilable Differences
- Johnny Dangerously
- Joy of Sex
- Kidco
- The Lonely Guy
- Lovelines
- Making the Grade
- Mass Appeal
- Meatballs Part II
- Micki + Maude
- Moscow on the Hudson
- The Muppets Take Manhattan
- Night Patrol
- No Small Affair
- Nothing Lasts Forever
- Oh, God! You Devil
- Police Academy
- Preppies
- Protocol
- Repo Man
- The Ratings Game
- Revenge of the Nerds
- Rhinestone
- Romancing the Stone
- Slapstick of Another Kind
- Splash
- Surf II
- Teachers
- This Is Spinal Tap
- Top Secret!
- The Toxic Avenger
- Unfaithfully Yours
- Up the Creek
- The Wild Life
- Where the Boys Are '84
- The Woman in Red

=== 1985 ===
- After Hours
- Back to the Future
- Bad Medicine
- Better Off Dead
- The Breakfast Club
- Breaking All the Rules
- Brewster's Millions
- Clue
- The Coca-Cola Kid
- Cocoon
- Compromising Positions
- Creator
- Desperately Seeking Susan
- European Vacation
- Fandango
- Fletch
- Fraternity Vacation
- Girls Just Want to Have Fun
- Goodbye, New York
- The Goonies
- Head Office
- Heaven Help Us
- The Heavenly Kid
- Into the Night
- The Jewel of the Nile
- Just One of the Guys
- Key Exchange
- The Last Dragon
- Lost in America
- Lust in the Dust
- The Man with One Red Shoe
- Maxie
- Mischief
- Moving Violations
- Movers & Shakers
- Murphy's Romance
- My Science Project
- Once Bitten
- Pee Wee's Big Adventure
- Police Academy 2: Their First Assignment
- Police Story
- Porky's Revenge
- Private Resort
- Prizzi's Honor
- The Purple Rose of Cairo
- Real Genius
- Remo Williams: The Adventure Begins
- Rustlers' Rhapsody
- Secret Admirer
- Sesame Street Presents: Follow That Bird
- The Slugger's Wife
- Spies Like Us
- Summer Rental
- The Sure Thing
- Teen Wolf
- Tomboy
- Transylvania 6-5000
- Turk 182
- Volunteers
- Weird Science

=== 1986 ===
- About Last Night
- April Fool's Day
- Armed and Dangerous
- Back to School
- The Best of Times
- Big Trouble in Little China
- Big Trouble
- The Boss' Wife
- Brighton Beach Memoirs
- The Class of Nuke 'Em High
- Club Paradise
- Crimes of the Heart
- Crocodile Dundee
- Down and Out in Beverly Hills
- Echo Park
- Ferris Bueller's Day Off
- A Fine Mess
- The Golden Child
- Gung Ho
- Hamburger: The Motion Picture
- Hannah and Her Sisters
- Haunted Honeymoon
- Heartburn
- Heathcliff: The Movie
- Hollywood Vice Squad
- Howard the Duck
- Jake Speed
- Jo Jo Dancer, Your Life Is Calling
- Jumpin' Jack Flash
- Last Resort
- Legal Eagles
- Little Shop of Horrors
- The Longshot
- Lucas
- Miracles
- Modern Girls
- The Money Pit
- My Chauffeur
- Night of the Creeps
- Nobody's Fool
- Nothing in Common
- Odd Jobs
- Off Beat
- One Crazy Summer
- One More Saturday Night
- Peggy Sue Got Married
- Playing for Keeps
- Police Academy 3: Back in Training
- Running Scared
- Ruthless People
- Shanghai Surprise
- She's Gotta Have It
- Short Circuit
- Something Wild
- Soul Man
- Stewardess School
- Stoogemania
- Sweet Liberty
- ¡Three Amigos!
- Tough Guys
- True Stories
- Wildcats
- Wise Guys
- Zeisters

=== 1987 ===
- Adventures in Babysitting
- The Allnighter
- Amazon Women on the Moon
- Baby Boom
- Back to the Beach
- Barfly
- * batteries not included
- Beverly Hills Cop II
- Blind Date
- Born in East L.A.
- Broadcast News
- Burglar
- Can't Buy Me Love
- Creepshow 2
- Critical Condition
- Cross My Heart
- Disorderlies
- Dragnet
- Dudes
- Eddie Murphy Raw
- Ernest Goes to Camp
- Fatal Beauty
- From the Hip
- The Garbage Pail Kids Movie
- Going Bananas
- Good Morning, Vietnam
- Harry and the Hendersons
- He's My Girl
- Hello Again
- Hot Pursuit
- Housekeeping
- Hunk
- Innerspace
- In the Mood
- Ishtar
- Leonard Part 6
- Lethal Weapon
- Like Father Like Son
- Love at Stake
- Made in Heaven
- Maid to Order
- Making Mr. Right
- Mannequin
- Meatballs III: Summer Job
- Million Dollar Mystery
- Moonstruck
- Morgan Stewart's Coming Home
- Munchies
- My Demon Lover
- Nadine
- Nice Girls Don't Explode
- Outrageous Fortune
- Overboard
- The Pick-up Artist
- Planes, Trains & Automobiles
- Police Academy 4: Citizens on Patrol
- Pretty Smart
- The Princess Bride
- Project X
- Radio Days
- Raising Arizona
- Real Men
- Rent-A-Cop
- Revenge of the Nerds II: Nerds in Paradise
- Roxanne
- The Secret of My Success
- Spaceballs
- The Squeeze
- Stakeout
- Straight to Hell
- Street Trash
- Summer School
- Surrender
- Teen Wolf Too
- The Trouble with Spies
- They Still Call Me Bruce
- Three for the Road
- Three Men and a Baby
- Three O'Clock High
- Throw Momma from the Train
- Tin Men
- The Underachievers
- Walk Like a Man
- Who's That Girl
- The Witches of Eastwick

=== 1988 ===
- 18 Again!
- A Fish Called Wanda
- Action Jackson
- And God Created Woman
- Arthur 2: On the Rocks
- Beetlejuice
- Big
- Big Business
- Big Top Pee-wee
- Biloxi Blues
- The Blue Iguana
- Bull Durham
- Caddyshack II
- Casual Sex?
- Cherry 2000
- Cocktail
- Coming to America
- Crash Course
- Crocodile Dundee II
- The Couch Trip
- Daffy Duck's Quackbusters
- Dangerous Curves
- Dead Heat
- Dirty Rotten Scoundrels
- Drowning by Numbers
- Earth Girls Are Easy
- Elvira: Mistress of the Dark
- Ernest Saves Christmas
- Feds
- For Keeps
- Funny Farm
- The Great Outdoors
- Hairspray
- Heartbreak Hotel
- High Spirits
- Hot to Trot
- I'm Gonna Git You Sucka
- Johnny Be Good
- Killer Klowns from Outer Space
- License to Drive
- Married to the Mob
- Memories of Me
- Midnight Run
- Moon over Parador
- Moving
- Mr. North
- Mystic Pizza
- My Stepmother Is an Alien
- The Naked Gun: From the Files of Police Squad!
- A New Life
- The Night Before
- Not of This Earth
- Pass the Ammo
- Plain Clothes
- Police Academy 5: Assignment Miami Beach
- The Prince of Pennsylvania
- Punchline
- Rain Man
- Red Heat
- Satisfaction
- School Daze
- Scrooged
- She's Having a Baby
- Short Circuit 2
- Some Girls
- Stars and Bars
- Sticky Fingers
- Sweet Hearts Dance
- Switching Channels
- Tapeheads
- Things Change
- The Telephone
- Twins
- Vibes
- Vice Versa
- Who Framed Roger Rabbit
- Without a Clue
- Working Girl
- You Can't Hurry Love

=== 1989 ===
- Back to the Future Part II
- Beverly Hills Brats
- The Big Picture
- Bill and Ted's Excellent Adventure
- Bloodhounds of Broadway
- Breaking In
- The Burbs
- Cannibal Women in the Avocado Jungle of Death
- Chances Are
- Checking Out
- Christmas Vacation
- C.H.U.D. II: Bud the C.H.U.D.
- Cold Feet
- Cookie
- Cousins
- Crimes and Misdemeanors
- Dad
- Disorganized Crime
- Dream a Little Dream
- The Dream Team
- The Experts
- The Fabulous Baker Boys
- Family Business
- Fletch Lives
- Ghostbusters II
- The Gods Must Be Crazy II
- Going Overboard
- Harlem Nights
- Heathers
- Her Alibi
- Homer and Eddie
- Honey, I Shrunk the Kids
- How I Got into College
- Identity Crisis
- The January Man
- K-9
- Lethal Weapon 2
- Let It Ride
- Little Monsters
- Look Who's Talking
- Loverboy
- Major League
- Meet The Feebles
- Miss Firecracker
- New York Stories
- Out Cold
- Parenthood
- Parents
- Penn & Teller Get Killed
- Pink Cadillac
- Police Academy 6: City Under Siege
- Powwow Highway
- Roger & Me (documentary)
- Rude Awakening
- Say Anything...
- Scenes from the Class Struggle in Beverly Hills
- Second Sight
- See No Evil, Hear No Evil
- See You in the Morning
- Shag
- She-Devil
- She's Out of Control
- Shocker
- Skin Deep
- Society
- Slaves of New York
- Speed Zone
- Staying Together
- Steel Magnolias
- Tango and Cash
- Teen Witch
- The Toxic Avenger Part II
- The Toxic Avenger Part III: The Last Temptation of Toxie
- Three Fugitives
- Transylvania Twist
- Traveling Man
- Troop Beverly Hills
- True Love
- Turner & Hooch
- Twister
- UHF
- Uncle Buck
- Vampire's Kiss
- The War of the Roses
- Weekend at Bernie's
- We're No Angels
- When Harry Met Sally...
- Who's Harry Crumb?
- Wicked Stepmother
- The Wizard
- Worth Winning
- Young Einstein

=== British films ===
- An American Werewolf in London (1981)
- Brazil (1985)
- Bullshot (1983)
- Clockwise (1986)
- Comfort and Joy (1984)
- Consuming Passions (1988)
- Educating Rita (1983)
- Erik the Viking (1989)
- A Fish Called Wanda (1988)
- George and Mildred (1980)
- Gregory's Girl (1980)
- High Hopes (1988)
- Invitation to the Wedding (1983)
- Jane and the Lost City (1988)
- Local Hero (1983)
- Loose Connections (1983)
- The Missionary (1983)
- Monty Python's The Meaning of Life (1983)
- Morons from Outer Space (1985)
- Personal Services (1987)
- A Private Function (1984)
- Privates on Parade (1982)
- Restless Natives (1985)
- Rising Damp (1980)
- Rita, Sue and Bob Too (1986)
- Shirley Valentine (1989)
- The Tall Guy (1989)
- Time Bandits (1981)
- Victor Victoria (1982)
- Water (1985)
- Wish You Were Here (1987)
- Withnail and I (1987)

== Comedy-horror ==
1981

- An American Werewolf in London
- Full Moon High
- The Funhouse
- Motel Hell

1982

- Basket Case
- Big Meat Eater
- Hysterical

1983

- Bloodbath at the House of Death
- Frightmare

1984

- Bloodsuckers from Outer Space
- Gremlins
- The Toxic Avenger

1985

- Mr. Vampire
- Once Bitten
- Re-Animator
- The Return of the Living Dead
- The Stuff

1986

- Blood Hook
- Class of Nuke 'Em High
- Critters
- Evil Laugh
- From Beyond
- Haunted Honeymoon
- House
- Little Shop of Horrors
- Monster in the Closet
- Night of the Creeps
- The Seventh Curse
- TerrorVision
- Vamp

1987

- Bad Taste
- A Chinese Ghost Story
- Deathrow Gameshow
- Evil Dead II
- House II: The Second Story
- I Was a Teenage Zombie
- The Monster Squad

1988

- Beetlejuice
- Curse of the Queerwolf
- Dead Heat
- Elvira: Mistress of the Dark
- High Spirits
- Hollywood Chainsaw Hookers
- Killer Klowns from Outer Space
- The Lair of the White Worm
- My Best Friend Is a Vampire
- Night of the Demons
- Return of the Living Dead Part II
- Waxwork

1989

- Cannibal Women in the Avocado Jungle of Death
- Chopper Chicks in Zombietown
- Cutting Class
- Dr.Caligari
- My Mom's a Werewolf
- Out of the Dark
- Over-sexed Rugsuckers from Mars
- The Toxic Avenger Part II
- The Toxic Avenger Part III: The Last Temptation of Toxie

== Sci-fi comedy ==
- The Adventures of Buckaroo Banzai Across the 8th Dimension (1984)
- Airplane II: The Sequel
- Back to the Future (1985)
- * batteries not included (1987)
- Bill & Ted's Excellent Adventure (1989)
- Cherry 2000 (1987)
- The Creature Wasn't Nice, aka Naked Space (1983)
- Critters (1986)
- Critters 2: The Main Course (1988)
- Earth Girls Are Easy (1988)
- Galaxina (1980)
- Ghostbusters (1984)
- Ghostbusters II (1989)
- Honey, I Shrunk the Kids (1989)
- The Ice Pirates (1984)
- The Incredible Shrinking Woman (1981)
- Innerspace (1987)
- Jekyll and Hyde... Together Again (1982)
- Killer Klowns from Outer Space (1988)
- Making Mr. Right (1987)
- The Man with Two Brains (1983)
- Morons from Outer Space (1985)
- My Science Project (1985)
- Night of the Comet (1984)
- Real Genius (1985)
- Repo Man (1984)
- Seksmisja (Poland, 1984)
- Short Circuit (1986)
- Short Circuit 2 (1988)
- Slapstick of Another Kind (1982)
- Spaceballs (1987)
- Time Bandits (1981)
- Weird Science (1985)

== Comedy-drama ==
- 48 Hrs. (1982)
- About Last Night... (1986)
- Always (1989)
- Author! Author!
- Bagdad Café (1987)
- Born in Flames (1983)
- The Breakfast Club (1985)
- Cannery Row (1982)
- The Decline of the American Empire (Le Déclin de l'empire américain) (1986)
- Driving Miss Daisy (1989)
- Fast Times at Ridgemont High
- Grandview, U.S.A. (1984)
- Hannah and Her Sisters
- Heartburn
- Jo Jo Dancer, Your Life Is Calling
- The King of Comedy
- Lucas
- Melvin and Howard (1980)
- Ménage (1986)
- Mystic Pizza
- My 20th Century (1989)
- Nothing in Common (1986)
- Oh! Heavenly Dog
- Private Benjamin (1980)
- Prizzi's Honor (1985)
- Punchline (1988)
- Samson & Sally – Song of the Whales (1984)
- Some Kind of Hero
- Steel Magnolias
- Teachers (1984)
- Working Girl (1988)

== Parody films ==
- Agent 000 and the Deadly Curves (1983)
- Airplane! (1980)
- Airplane II: The Sequel (1982)
- Amazon Women on the Moon (1987)
- Chucky and Willie Wanker's Chocolate Starfish (1984)
- Closet Cases of the Nerd Kind
- History of the World Part 1
- I'm Gonna Git You Sucka (1988)
- Johnny Dangerously 1984
- The Naked Gun: From the Files of Police Squad! (1988)
- Night of the Comet (1984)
- Spaceballs (1987)
- Top Secret! (1984)
- Traxx (1988)
- UHF (1989)
- Zapped! (1982)
