= Joaquin Garay =

Mexican-American actor and singer (1911–1990)

- Born: November 15, 1911; El Oro, Mexico
- Died: September 13, 1990 (aged 78); Los Angeles, California, U.S.
- Occupations: Actor and singer
- Known for: Voicing Panchito Pistoles
- Notable work: The Three Caballeros
- Children: 4, including Val and Joaquin III

Joaquin Garay (November 15, 1911 – September 13, 1990) was a Mexican actor and singer. He was known for voicing Panchito Pistoles in the 1944 Walt Disney film The Three Caballeros.

== Career ==
Born in El Oro, Mexico, Garay came to America at eleven months. He was a well-known radio performer in the 1940s, and opened the popular Copacabana nightclub in September 1941, which was frequented by visiting Hollywood celebrities. He hosted shows in the nightclub and performed in vaudeville, and recorded an album in the mid-40s, "A Night at Joaquin Garay's Copacabana".

Garay voiced the Mexican rooster Panchito in 1944, teaming up with Clarence Nash as Donald Duck and José Oliveira as José Carioca to sing The Three Caballeros' title song. However, after recording, Garay's speaking voice as Panchito was found to be wanting:

Garay had a fine singing voice and was technically a native of Mexico, but he had spent nearly all of his life in the United States, and to an experienced ear his accent and phrasing just did not sound convincingly Mexican. Jack Cutting, who was still the studio's resident "foreign expert", noted the problem as early as February 1944 when he heard the earliest recordings: "The Garay rendition of the song ['The Three Caballeros]' is excellent, but do not care for his handling of the narration back of 'Las Posadas'. It sounds as though he is striving too much for a Mexican accent. It seems artificial and the tone and tempo of the narration is out of keeping with the pictures and music of the sequence."

Cutting hired a Mexican actor, Felipe Turich, to be Garay's vocal coach, but for the Mexican Spanish-language version of the film, Cutting decided to simply use Turich as Panchito's speaking voice, with Garay singing. Turich also replaced Gary as Panchito in the Italian-language version of the film, but only for the speaking parts, as Panchito's singing is taken from the Mexican Spanish dub.

However, Garay returned to Disney in 1953 to voice the Narrator and the other characters in a Goofy short, For Whom the Bulls Toil.

In the 1950s, Garay appeared in the films Crisis (1950) Saddle Tramp (1950), Lightning Strikes Twice (1951), Fast Company (1953) and Latin Lovers (1953). He also had a small part in an episode of The Lucy-Desi Comedy Hour,"Lucy Goes to Mexico", in 1958. He later moved to Los Angeles.

In the 1970s, Garay appeared on television in the TV-movies Red Sky at Morning (1971) and The Gun (1974), and in the shows Sanford and Son ("Pops 'n' Pals", 1973) and Mannix ("Bird of Prey", 1975).

== Personal life ==
Garay has four children: Grammy Award-winning record producer and audio engineer Val Garay, actor and writer Ricky Garay, actress Linda Garay, and actor Joaquin Garay III who, like his father, also appeared in a Disney film, 1980's Herbie Goes Bananas.
