= Freeze Frame (1992 film) =

1992 television film by William Bindley

- Genre: Family; Thriller
- Written by: William Bindley
- Directed by: William Bindley
- Starring: Shannen Doherty
- Country of origin: United States
- Original language: English

Production
- Producer: Martin Wiley
- Cinematography: Craig Somers
- Editor: Jeffrey R. Neuman
- Running time: 78 minutes
- Production companies: Creative Edge Films Production; FilmIndiana INVESTMENT FUND I

Original release
- Release: December 28, 1992

Freeze Frame is a 1992 television film directed by William Bindley.

== Plot ==
Lindsay Scott is an intelligent student who works as a reporter for her high school in suburban Indianapolis. She uncovers a huge economic-espionage conspiracy. She reports to the authorities, but they refuse to believe her. Lindsay and her friends decide to uncover the bad guys themselves and come up with a dangerous plan.

== Cast ==
- Shannen Doherty – Lindsay Scott
- Robyn Douglass – Victoria Case
- Charles Haid – Dr. Michael Scott
- Ryan Lambert – Tripp
- Adam Carl – Brandon
