= 240-Robert =

- John Bennett Perry, Joanna Cassidy and Mark Harmon
- Genre: Drama
- Created by: Rick Rosner
- Written by: Charlene Bralver; Lew Hunter; Simon Muntner; James Schmerer; Anthony Yerkovich
- Directed by: Richard Benedict; Phil Bondelli; John Florea; Bruce Kessler; Sigmund Neufeld, Jr.; Christian I. Nyby II; Sutton Roley; Ric Rondell
- Starring: John Bennett Perry; Mark Harmon; Joanna Cassidy; Stephan Burns; Pamela Hensley
- Theme music composer: Pete Carpenter; Mike Post
- Composers: Mike Post (1.1, 1.3); Pete Carpenter (1.1, 1.3); Ken Heller; J. A. C. Redford (1.6, co-composer); Murray MacLeod (1.6); Harry Betts (1.10, 1.13) Mark Snow (2.1, 2.2, 2.3)
- Country of origin: United States
- Original language: English
- No. of seasons: 2
- No. of episodes: 16

Production
- Executive producer: Rick Rosner
- Producer: Richard M. Rosenbloom
- Editors: Dann Cahn; Mike Renaud; Randy Roberts; Jack Tucker
- Camera setup: Single-camera
- Running time: 45–48 minutes
- Production companies: Rosner Television; Filmways

Original release
- Network: ABC
- Release: August 28, 1979 – March 21, 1981

240-Robert is an American drama television series that ran on ABC from August 28, 1979, to March 21, 1981. The series title is a reference to 240-R, the call-sign designation for the Los Angeles County Sheriff's Department's search and rescue/paramedic teams.

== Synopsis ==
The series chronicles the missions of "240-Robert", a specialized unit of the Los Angeles County Sheriff's Department (LASD), that utilized four wheel drive vehicles and a helicopter. Most of the assignments were sea/air/land search and rescue operations in the extensive (over 4,000 sq mi (10,000 km^{2})) jurisdiction. The show's creator was Rick Rosner (himself an LASD reserve deputy), who created the hit series CHiPs two years earlier for NBC.

The vehicles used at that time were 1979 Ford Broncos, while the helicopter was a Hughes HA-500C (similar in design to the current MD 500).

The series was based on real life cases encountered by the LASD's Emergency Services Detail. The real life ESD is actually headquartered in East Los Angeles. Rick Rosner took artistic liberty and portrayed the headquarters as a beach-side station. The actual filming location was at a State of California ranger station located at Sycamore Cove in Ventura County, California. The series was inspired, in part, on the experiences of Officer Charles Thibaudeau of the Hermosa Beach Police Department.

== Cast ==
- John Bennett Perry as Deputy Theodore Roosevelt "Trap" Applegate III
- Mark Harmon as Deputy Dwayne "Thib" Thibideaux (episodes 1–13)
- Joanna Cassidy as Deputy Morgan Wainwright (episodes 1–13), the unit's helicopter pilot
- Stephan W. Burns as Deputy Brett Cueva (episodes 14–16), who replaced Thib
- Pamela Hensley as Deputy Sandy Harper (episodes 14–16), the new pilot of the unit

Cassidy and Hensley both had an expert helicopter pilot take over for them in the actual helicopter flight sequences; this regular stunt pilot was Charles 'Chuck' Tamburro who wore a wig to give the appearance of a female pilot.

Matthew Perry's first credited role was a small part in the show, where he played a child actor in a 1979 episode.

== Cancellation ==
Harmon and Cassidy left the series when their contracts expired after the first season. Burns and Hensley were brought in to replace them, but the second season (returning mid-season in early 1981 due to an actor's strike) only lasted three episodes before ABC cancelled it due to poor ratings.

== Episodes ==
=== Season 1 (1979) ===
No. overall	No. in season	Title	Directed by	Written by	Original release date
1	1	"The Apology"	Paul Krasny	Story by : Rick Rosner; Teleplay by : John Furia Jr.	August 28, 1979
2	2	"Stuntman"	Ric Rondell	Story by : Rudy Dochtermann & Lew Hunter; Teleplay by : Lew Hunter	September 3, 1979
3	3	"Bathysphere"	Phil Bondelli	James Schmerer	September 10, 1979
4	4	"Models"	Phil Bondelli	L. Ford Neale & John Huff	September 17, 1979
5	5	"Acting Sergeant"	Sutton Roley	Story by : Rudy Dochtermann & Simon Muntner; Teleplay by : Simon Muntner	September 24, 1979
6	6	"Bank Job"	Sigmund Neufeld, Jr.	Rudy Dochtermann	October 1, 1979
7	7	"Out of Sight"	Christian I. Nyby II	James Schmerer	October 15, 1979
8	8	"Time Bomb"	Christian I. Nyby II	Patrick Mathews	October 22, 1979
9	9	"Double Trouble"	John Florea	Simon Muntner	October 29, 1979
10	10	"Poison Air"	Sigmund Neufeld, Jr.	Story by : Peter Dixon & Anthony Yerkovich; Teleplay by : Anthony Yerkovich	November 5, 1979
11	11	"Earthquake"	Christian I. Nyby II	Charlene Bralver	November 19, 1979
12	12	"The Applicant"	Phil Bondelli	Robert Specht	November 26, 1979
13	13	"Oil and Water"	Bruce Kessler	Story by : Rudy Dochtermann & Glen Olson & Rod Baker; Teleplay by : Glen Olson & Rod Baker	December 3, 1979

=== Season 2 (1981) ===
No. overall	No. in season	Title	Directed by	Written by	Original release date
14	1	"A Cool Welcome"	Reza Badiyi	Story by : Rudy Dochtermann; Teleplay by : E. Nick Alexander and Alan Godfrey	March 7, 1981
15	2	"First Loss"	John Peyser	William F. Nolan	March 14, 1981
16	3	"Hostages"	James Sheldon	Herman Groves	March 21, 1981
