= Faith Minton =

American actress

Faith Minton is an American retired television and film actress and stuntwoman.

== Life ==
Minton portrayed "Hurricane" Rosy Spelman in the 1979 action comedy film Temporale Rosy opposite Gerard Depardieu, and "Big Mama", a wrestler in the 1981 film ...All The Marbles, with Peter Falk, Laurene Landon and Vicki Frederick.

In 1983, she appeared as the villain's henchwoman in the Italian action comedy Go for It, with Terence Hill, Bud Spencer and David Huddleston and in a supporting role in Smokey and the Bandit Part 3, alongsides Paul Williams, Colleen Camp and Jerry Reed, and opposite Jackie Gleason and Mike Henry. She later guest starred in series such as Fantasy Island, Night Court, Simon & Simon, Knight Rider, V.I.P., and Murder, She Wrote.

== Selected filmography ==
- 1978 King of the Gypsies as Gypsy (uncredited)
- 1979 Gold of the Amazons as Amazon Warrior
- 1979 The Wanderers as The Big Lady
- 1979 Temporale Rosy as Rosy "Hurricane Rosy" Spelman / Temporale Rosy
- 1980 Cheech & Chong's Next Movie as Lady Bouncer
- 1981 ...All The Marbles as "Big Mama"
- 1981 All Night Long as Holdup Woman
- 1981 Hill Street Blues as Large Hooker
- 1981 Charlie Chan and the Curse of the Dragon Queen as Stunt Performer
- 1981 Heartbeeps as Stunt Performer
- 1983 Go for It as The Vamp / La Fatalona
- 1983 Fantasy Island as Mo
- 1983 Smokey and the Bandit Part 3 as Tina
- 1983 The Man Who Wasn't There as Stunt Performer
- 1984 The New Mike Hammer as Bertha
- 1984 Night Court as Elsa Dubrinovitch
- 1985 Lust in the Dust as Stunt Performer
- 1985 Hardcastle and McCormick as Lizzie Butterfly
- 1985 Murder, She Wrote as Second Guard
- 1985 Knight Rider as Darleen
- 1986 The Naked Cage as Sheila
- 1986 Misfits of Science as Darleen
- 1986 Ruthless People as Stunt Performer
- 1986 Simon & Simon as Olga, The Shoplifter
- 1987 Jocks as Big Woman In Bar (uncredited)
- 1987 Who's That Girl? as Donovan
- 1987 Penitentiary III as Female Boxer
- 1987 Star Trek: The Next Generation as Klingon Female
- 1987 Hooperman as Biker Woman
- 1988 License to Drive as Stunt Performer
- 1988 Hero and the Terror as Stunt Performer
- 1989 Santa Barbara, as Ilsa, she tried to frame Mack for stealing jewels from people at the fitness center.
- 1989 Alien Nation as Bouncer
- 1991 Switch as Nancy, The Bouncer
- 1992 Stay Tuned as Mrs. Gorgon
- 1992 Swordsman II as the American dub version of Invisible Asia.
- 1995 The Stranger as Kyra, a member of Angel's outlaw biker gang.
- 1995 Sudden Death as Carla, one of the terrorists who took Civic Arena during a Stanley Cup Finals game.
- 1996 Set It Off as Stunt Performer
- 1997 Roseanne as Wrestler
- 1997 Unhappily Ever After as Bertha
- 1997 Spawn as Stunt Performer
- 1998 V.I.P. as Brenda "Big Brenda"
- 2001 Bubble Boy as Stunt Performer
- 2002 She Spies as Jolene
- 2005 Miss Congeniality 2: Armed and Fabulous as Housewife #1
- 2006 Sons & Daughters as Biker Chick
- 2007 Days of Our Lives as Bertha "Big Bertha" / Tessa / Jail Matron

== Stuntwork (extra) ==
- 1997 Batman & Robin
- 1986 Ruthless People
