= Hurricane Rosy =

- Directed by: Mario Monicelli
- Written by: Age & Scarpelli; Mario Monicelli
- Produced by: Alberto Grimaldi
- Starring: Gérard Depardieu; Faith Minton
- Cinematography: Tonino Delli Colli
- Edited by: Ruggero Mastroianni
- Music by: Gianfranco Plenizio
- Release date: 1980
- Countries: Italy; France

Hurricane Rosy (Italian: Temporale Rosy, French: Rosy la bourrasque) is a 1980 Italian-French comedy film written and directed by Mario Monicelli. It is loosely based on a novel by Carlo Brizzolara.

== Plot ==
Raoul, a young boxer nicknamed "Spaccadoore", is forced to interrupt a brilliant career due to a broken hand caused by a trivial bet. He is thus reduced to working in a booth where some female wrestling champions perform. Here he is fascinated by an immensely beautiful girl, unbeatable in strength exercises. This girl is Temporale Rosy, who wins a goldfish and leaves, followed by Raoul.

A few months later, in the north of France, the women's wrestling troupe, of which Rosy is a member, gives its show. There are guests of honor, "old glories" presented by the "Count". Among them, former champions of "all categories", there is Raoul, seduced again by Rosy. Mike, the troop's manager, secretly in love with her, immediately senses the attraction that the young people have for each other and conceives a strong jealousy.

Raoul and Rosy move in together, but their life together turns out to be difficult and chaotic. Raoul takes part in the wrestling show: he sits in the audience, plays the troublemaker and even climbs into the ring, but he doesn't like this role. So he finds a job at the port without Rosy knowing.

From one argument to another, the couple separates. Rosy gets engaged to Mike and Raoul goes out with a manicurist, Charlotte. During a gala evening, Mike announces his future marriage. Raoul, to force Rosy's admiration, announces that he will return to boxing. An argument breaks out between Mike and Raoul and turns into a general brawl.

Back in boxing, Raoul is practically torn to pieces by his opponent, Bill. Rosy, who attended the match, can't wait to see the man she still loves defeated. She waits for Bill at the exit of the gym, and gives him back his own. Realizing that Rosy is still in love with Raoul, Mike sacrifices himself and decides to break up with her, letting her believe that she was the one who took the initiative. They argue, Rosy leaves, but all these emotions are too strong for Mike, who has a heart attack and faints.

== Cast ==
- Gérard Depardieu as Raoul Lamarre
- Faith Minton as Rosy "Hurricane Rosy" Spelman / Temporale Rosy
- Jean Claude Levis as Kunta Kinte
- Lola García as Jeanne
- Kathleen Thompson as Trudy
- Roland Bock as Mike Fernandez
- Helga Anders as Charlotte
- Charles Bollet as Arbitro
- Gianrico Tedeschi as The Count
