= Body Rock =

1984 film directed by Marcelo Epstein

- Theatrical release poster
- Directed by: Marcelo Epstein
- Written by: Desmond Nakano; Kimberly Lynn White
- Produced by: Jeff Schechtman
- Starring: Lorenzo Lamas; Vicki Frederick; Cameron Dye; Michelle Nicastro; Ray Sharkey
- Cinematography: Robby Müller
- Edited by: Lorenzo DeStefano; Richard Halsey
- Music by: Sylvester Levay
- Production company: New World Pictures
- Distributed by: New World Pictures
- Release date: September 28, 1984
- Running time: 94 minutes
- Country: United States
- Language: English
- Box office: $1.7 million

Body Rock is a 1984 American dance drama film directed by Marcelo Epstein, and written by Desmond Nakano and Kimberly Lynn White. It stars Lorenzo Lamas as Chilly D, a young man "from the streets" with a talent for break-dancing, and co-stars Vicki Frederick, Cameron Dye, Michelle Nicastro and Ray Sharkey.

The film received mostly negative reviews from critics, but the title song, performed by Maria Vidal, became a chart success worldwide.

== Plot ==
Chilly a street dancer with a talent for break-dancing. After his dancing attracts the attention of industry professional Terrence Mitchell, he is given an opportunity to pursue a career in the entertainment industry. As he moves closer to achieving fame and success, he encounters the challenges and consequences associated with his newfound opportunities.

== Cast ==
- Lorenzo Lamas as Chester "Chilly D"
- Vicki Frederick as Claire
- Cameron Dye as "E-Z"
- Michelle Nicastro as Darlene
- Ray Sharkey as Terrence Mitchell
- Seth Kaufman as Jama
- Rene Elizondo as "Snake"
- Joseph Whipp as Donald
- Grace Zabriskie as Chilly's Mother
- Tony Ganios as Big Mac
- Carole Ita White as Unemployment Lady
- Ellen Gerstein as Secretary
- James Greene as Chilly's Friend

== Production ==
After production had wrapped, landlords of a building at 5504 Hollywood Blvd., Hollywood, Los Angeles, California, used for the shoot sued Body Rock Productions and producer Jeff Schechtman of New World Pictures for $21,810 in damages after the production had allegedly "practically demolished the premises." with the plaintiffs citing repairs plus lost rent.

== Reception ==
Body Rock received negative reviews from critics and was a failure at the box office. Lorenzo Lamas' performance was nominated for the Golden Raspberry Award for Worst Actor at the 5th Golden Raspberry Awards, but lost to Sylvester Stallone in Rhinestone. Also nominated was the song "Smooth Talker", one of two songs in the film performed by Lamas, for the Golden Raspberry Award for Worst Original Song. The other, "Fools Like Me", remains Lamas' one single to date to crack the Billboard Hot 100 chart; it peaked at number 85 in January 1985.

In his book The Official Razzie Movie Guide, John J. B. Wilson, founder of the Golden Raspberry Awards, listed the film as one of The 100 Most Enjoyably Bad Movies Ever Made.

== Music ==
The soundtrack, issued on LP in 1984, features Laura Branigan, Roberta Flack, Ashford & Simpson and others. The theme song "Body Rock", performed by Maria Vidal, peaked at number 48 on the Hot 100 in October 1984 and reached number eight on the US dance chart. The same month, Branigan's "Sharpshooter" hit #12 on Record Mirror's Hi-NRG Disco charts. A year later, in the autumn of 1985, "Body Rock" reached number 11 on the UK singles chart.

No.	Title	Writer(s)	Length
1.	"Body Rock" (Maria Vidal)	Sylvester Levay; John Bettis	3:40
2.	"Teamwork" (David Lasley)	Andy Goldmark; Bruce Roberts	3:35
3.	"Why You Wanna Break My Heart?" (Dwight Twilley)	Twilley	3:43
4.	"One Thing Leads to Another" (Roberta Flack)	Goldmark; Phil Galdston	3:58
5.	"Let Your Body Rock (Don't Stop)" (Ralph MacDonald)	MacDonald; William Salter; William Eaton	3:20
6.	"Vanishing Point" (Baxter Robertson)	Robertson	3:01
7.	"Sharpshooter" (Laura Branigan)	Mark Blatte; Larry Gottlieb	4:17
8.	"The Jungle" (Ashford & Simpson)	Nickolas Ashford; Valerie Simpson	2:53
9.	"Deliver" (Martin Briley)	Briley; Galdston	3:20
10.	"The Closest to Love" (Ashford & Simpson)	Ashford; Simpson; Galdston; Philip Rabinowitz	4:03

Bonus tracks
No.	Title	Writer(s)	Length
11.	"Do You Know Who I Am?" (Ashford & Simpson)	Ashford; Simpson	3:00
12.	"Smooth Talker" (Lorenzo Lamas)	Michael Sembello; Danny Sembello; Mark Hudson	3:31
13.	"Fools Like Me" (Lorenzo Lamas)	Levay; Goldmark; Galdston	3:00
14.	"Body Rock (Dance Mix)" (Maria Vidal)	Levay; Bettis	6:24
15.	"Body Rock (Dub Mix)" (Maria Vidal)	Levay; Bettis	4:26
16.	"Body Rock (Disco Purrfection Mix)" (Maria Vidal)	Levay; Bettis	9:51

=== Chart performance for "Body Rock" ===
Chart (1984–1985)	Peak Position
Canada Top Singles (RPM)	84
Denmark (Hitlisten)	17
Finland (Suomen virallinen lista)	23
France (SNEP)	11
Iceland (Morgunblaðið)	17
Ireland (IRMA)	7
South Africa (Springbok Radio)	5
Sweden (Sverigetopplistan)	14
Switzerland (Schweizer Hitparade)	6
UK Singles (Official Charts)	11
US Billboard Hot 100	48
West Germany (GfK)	16
Zimbabwe (ZIMA)	1
