= Fast Company (1953 film) =

1953 American comedy movie

- Directed by: John Sturges
- Written by: William Roberts; Adaptation: Don Mankiewicz; Story: Eustace Cockrell
- Produced by: Henry Berman
- Starring: Howard Keel; Polly Bergen; Nina Foch
- Cinematography: Harold Lipstein
- Edited by: Joseph Dervin
- Music by: Alberto Colombo
- Distributed by: Metro-Goldwyn-Mayer
- Release date: May 12, 1953
- Running time: 67 minutes
- Country: United States
- Language: English
- Budget: $584,000
- Box office: $523,000

Fast Company is a 1953 American comedy film directed by John Sturges and starring Howard Keel, Polly Bergen and Nina Foch. It was produced and distributed by major studio Metro-Goldwyn-Mayer.

== Plot ==
Carol Maldon leaves New York to run her recently deceased father's stable. Rick Grayton is the trainer and jockey of her horse Gay Fleet. It is an exceptional horse, but no one yet knows Gay Fleet because it is still young. Rick has been intentionally losing races to make the horse seem inferior so that he can buy it from Carol cheaply. However, he is discovered by Mercedes, a rival stable owner, who tells Rick's plan to Carol.

== Cast ==
- Polly Bergen as Carol Maldon
- Howard Keel as Rick Grayton
- Nina Foch as Mercedes Bellway
- Carol Nugent as Jigger Parkson
- Marjorie Main as Ma Parkson
- Horace McMahon as Two Pair Buford
- Iron Eyes Cody as Ben Iron Mountain
- Joaquin Garay as Manuel Morales
- Robert Burton as David Sandring

== Reception ==
According to MGM records, the film earned $392,000 in the US and Canada and $131,000 elsewhere, resulting in a loss of $275,000.

== See also ==
- List of films about horse racing
