= Robyn Douglass =

American actress

- Born: June 21, 1953 (age 72); Sendai, Japan
- Occupations: Actress, model
- Years active: 1978–1999
- Spouse(s): Rick Halprin (m. 2000; div. 200?)

Robyn Douglass (born June 21, 1953) is a retired American actress and model.

== Early life ==
The daughter of an Army doctor and hospital administrator, Robyn Douglass was born in Sendai, Japan. She began acting while attending a Catholic girls' school in Mountain View, California.

== Career ==
Douglass's known acting career spanned 21 years, from 1978 to 1999. She was featured in the films Breaking Away, Romantic Comedy, and The Lonely Guy, and she had a recurring role on the television series Galactica 1980.

=== Her Life As A Man ===
In 1984, Douglass appeared in the fact-based made-for-television comedy-drama film Her Life As A Man, an adaptation of "My Life As A Man," an article Carol Lynn Mithers had written for the Village Voice. Her character, Carly Perkins, was an aspiring female reporter who sought a sportswriting job on a national magazine whose editor was infamously chauvinistic and she disguised herself as a man, using the alias of Carl Parsons convincingly enough to be able to get the inside story she wanted.

== Legal disputes ==
Nude and erotic photos of Douglass appeared in a 1981 issue of Hustler, which led to her filing a lawsuit against the magazine. In the suit she claimed that the photos were published without her permission and portrayed her in a false light, including as a lesbian, which damaged her career as an advertising model. A jury ruled in her favor, but in 1985 the United States Court of Appeals for the Seventh Circuit reversed the judgment and ordered a new trial. The United States Supreme Court let the order stand without comment.

== Marriage ==
On December 2, 2000, Douglass married criminal defense attorney Rick Halprin, known for representing high-profile clients, including Chicago crime boss Joseph Lombardo.

In 2002, the Halprins sued Prairie Single Family Homes of Dearborn Park Association under the Civil Rights Act of 1968, claiming that the neighborhood association was allowing harassment of the couple because Halprin was Jewish. In 2004, the United States Court of Appeals for the Seventh Circuit reversed part of a lower court's dismissal of the case on narrow grounds.

Douglass divorced Halprin sometime before his death in 2013 and moved from Illinois to California, where she opened a bed-and-breakfast.

In 2020, Douglass released an audio memoir Messages for the Future: The Galactica 1980 Memoirs reflecting upon her career while commemorating the 40th anniversary of Galactica 1980, detailing her career and life, produced by Daniel Earnshaw and published by Explore Multimedia.

== Filmography ==
Film and television
Year	Title	Role	Notes
1978	The Clone Master	Gussie	Television film
1979	The Girls in the Office	Karen Heineman	Television film
1979	Breaking Away	Katherine	Feature film
1980	Tenspeed and Brown Shoe	Martha Gribb	1 episode: "Pilot: Part 1"
1980	Galactica 1980	Jamie Hamilton	Main cast (9 episodes)
1981	Trapper John, M.D.	Sheila	1 episode: "Second Sight"
1981	Golden Gate	Candy Martin	Television film
1982	Partners	Jill	Feature film
1983	Romantic Comedy	Kate Mallory	Feature film
1984	More Than Murder	Eve Warwick	Television film
1984	The Lonely Guy	Danielle	Feature film
1984	Her Life As A Man	Carly Perkins / Carl Parsons	Television film
1985-86	Stingray	Daphne Delgado	2 episodes: "Pilot" / "Orange Blossom"
1986	Lady Blue	Officer Sylvie Swenson	1 episode: "Sylvie"
1986	The New Mike Hammer	Dr. Bosnowski	1 episode: "Mike's Baby"
1987	Houston Knights	Lt. Joanne Beaumont	2 episodes: "Mirrors" / "North of the Border"
1993	Freeze Frame	Victoria Case	Television film
