= Stephan W. Burns =

American actor (1954–1990)

- Born: Stephan William Burns; November 14, 1954; Elkins Park, Pennsylvania, U.S.
- Died: February 22, 1990 (aged 35); Santa Barbara, California, U.S.
- Other names: Stephen W. Burns; Stephan Burns
- Occupation: Actor
- Years active: 1978–1987

Stephan William Burns (November 14, 1954 – February 22, 1990; also credited as Stephan W. Burns, Stephen W. Burns, and Stephan Burns) was an American actor best known for playing Pete Stancheck in Herbie Goes Bananas and Jack Cleary in the miniseries The Thorn Birds.

== Early life and career ==
Burns was born Stephan William Burns on November 14, 1954, in Elkins Park, Pennsylvania, and grew up in the small town of Chews Landing, New Jersey. As soon as he graduated high school, Burns moved to New York City to study theater. He worked odd jobs during the day to pay for his rent and the acting classes he attended at night. Auditions eventually led to an offer for the lead role in the national touring production of the Broadway hit Grease.

Burns moved to Hollywood and within six months, he was offered the role of Li'l Abner in the 1978 TV special Li'l Abner in Dogpatch Today. During his short career, Burns starred as Pete Stancheck in Walt Disney Productions' Herbie Goes Bananas and appeared on several television shows, as well as starring in the ABC series 240-Robert and The Thorn Birds miniseries. Other credits include Eight Is Enough, Heart of the City and Simon & Simon.

== Death ==
After being involved in a traffic collision in 1984, Burns received an emergency blood transfusion. The blood was contaminated, infecting him with HIV. Burns died at age 35 on February 22, 1990, in Santa Barbara, California.

== Filmography ==
Film and television
Year	Title	Role	Notes
1978	Li'l Abner in Dogpatch Today	Li'l Abner	TV movie
1979	Eight Is Enough	Dixon	Episode - "The Better Part of Valor"
1979	When She Was Bad...	Orderly	TV movie
1980	Herbie Goes Bananas	Pete Stancheck	Feature film
1981	240-Robert	Deputy Brett Cueva	Episodes: "A Cool Welcome", "First Loss", "Hostages"
1982	The Day the Bubble Burst		TV movie
1983	The Thorn Birds	Jack Cleary	TV miniseries (3 episodes)
1986	Spiker	Sonny Reston	Feature film
1987	Heart of the City	Del Ruth	Episode - "Beauty and a Couple of Beasts"
1987	Simon & Simon	David Jenner	Episode - "Walking Point"
1987	Werewolf	Brother Mark	Episode - "Let Us Prey" (final role)
