= Joaquin Garay III =

American former child actor (born 1968)

- Born: October 30, 1968 (age 57); Canoga Park, California, U.S.
- Occupation: Actor
- Known for: Playing Paco the boy in Herbie Goes Bananas (1980)
- Spouse: Brandi Ori (m. 1993)
- Children: 1
- Father: Joaquin Garay
- Relatives: Val Garay (half-brother)
- Website: www.joaquingaray3.com

Joaquin Garay III (born October 30, 1968) is a former American and Latin child actor. He is best known for playing the role of Paco in Herbie Goes Bananas.

== Biography ==
He later moved on to writing, acting and producing sketch comedy at the Improv at the Groundlings and the L.A. Connection in Los Angeles. His father was Joaquin Garay who had voiced Panchito Pistoles in The Three Caballeros (1945).
