= Partners (1982 film) =

1982 film by James Burrows

- Theatrical release poster
- Directed by: James Burrows
- Written by: Francis Veber
- Produced by: Aaron Russo; Francis Veber
- Starring: Ryan O'Neal; John Hurt; Kenneth McMillan; Robyn Douglass
- Cinematography: Victor J. Kemper
- Edited by: Danford B. Greene; Stephen Lovejoy
- Music by: Georges Delerue
- Production companies: Paramount Pictures; Aaron Russo Productions
- Distributed by: Paramount Pictures
- Release date: April 30, 1982
- Running time: 92 minutes
- Country: United States
- Language: English
- Budget: $6 million
- Box office: $6.1 million (US)

Partners is a 1982 American-Irish gay-themed buddy comedy film directed by James Burrows and starring Ryan O'Neal and John Hurt as Bob Benson and Fred Kerwin, a mismatched pair of cops.

== Plot ==
After a series of murders in Los Angeles's gay community, heterosexual police officer Sgt. Bob Benson is assigned to go undercover as half of a gay couple with Officer Fred Kerwin, a records clerk. Kerwin naively believes that he is closeted, although the entire department knows about his sexual identity. The pair discover an earlier murder and learn that both victims, Davis and Clyde Thompson, appeared in the same gay magazine. Each had received a call from a hoarse-voiced man asking them to model for him, only to turn up dead soon after. Benson models for the magazine and is approached by the same hoarse-voiced man, but when another model, Ed Petersen, turns up dead, the man is cleared as a suspect.

Benson grows close to Jill, the photographer of his shoot, and plans a weekend getaway with her. Kerwin suspects her of the murders, but his superiors put it down to jealousy. Kerwin uncovers evidence implicating Jill; but, when the police move to apprehend her, they discover her corpse. Her death unknown to Benson, he arrives for his rendezvous with Jill; and Kerwin races to his aid. The killer, a closeted man named Douglas whom Jill and Petersen were blackmailing, admits to Benson that he killed Jill, Davis and Petersen but insists that Jill killed her partner in crime Thompson. Realizing that Kerwin is outside, Douglas shoots at Kerwin who returns fire. Kerwin is wounded but Douglas is killed.

== Cast ==
- Ryan O'Neal as Sgt. Bob Benson
- John Hurt as Officer Fred Kerwin
- Kenneth McMillan as Captain Gavin Wilkins
- Robyn Douglass as Jill
- Jay Robinson as Halderstam
- Denise Galik as Clara
- Joseph R. Sicari as Walter
- Michael McGuire as Monroe
- Rick Jason as Douglas
- James Remar as Edward K. Petersen
- Jennifer Ashley as Secretary
- Darrell Larson as Al
- Tony March as Aide
- Seamon Glass as Gillis
- Steven Reisch as Counter Boy

== Production ==
Francis Veber wrote the film in Paris, with little knowledge of the gay scene in Los Angeles. Veber wanted to do it because "it seemed to me it could be amusing and I wanted to do something quite different from Cruising which seemed to me to be a really bad eye on the gay world.

The film was developed by Michael Medavoy at Orion Pictures. When he decided not to make it he sent the project to Aaron Russo, who was Bette Midler's agent. "It's a comedy," said producer Russo. "It's a comedy that comes out of real situations, out of the tradition of French farce. I felt for both characters." Russo arranged for James Burrows, then best known for directing episodes of Taxi, to direct. Burrows later wrote in his memoirs "We needed an overtly masculine character who felt out of place in the gay community."

The leading roles were originally offered to Clint Eastwood and Woody Allen. Eastwood expressed interest if Allen signed, but Allen declined. Other actors considered were Alan Arkin, James Caan and Nick Nolte. Burrows said they almost cast Sam Elliott and Peter Riegert but Barry Diller who ran Paramount "didn't think he could sell the movie with them attached." Eventually the two stars cast were Ryan O'Neal and John Hurt. Burrows thought O'Neal "would have been great as the gay cop" Fred Kerwin but was cast as the straight cop Bob Benson.

The film was one of six relatively low budgeted films rushed into production by Paramount Pictures in 1981 prior to an impending Directors Guild of America strike, with budgets between $4–8 million. Paramount were interested to see what the results would be like on films with a shortened pre-production process. The other films were Some Kind of Hero, Jekyll and Hyde... Together Again, I'm Dancing as Fast as I Can, White Dog and An Officer and a Gentleman. A seventh film, Young Lust, was "picked up" from another production company, RSO Films. Michael Eisner, the president of Paramount at the time, said that he "hated" the script. Partners was not championed within the studio by Don Simpson who lumped the film together with every other rush-job project except for An Officer and a Gentleman, which ultimately yielded a deal where Simpson agreed to get the fast tracked projects done on time and on budget as long as Eisner gave a green light to the eventual Richard Gere-Debra Winger-Louis Gossett Jr. starring blockbuster. Of all the seven films, Paramount executives were most enthusiastic about the script for Partners.

The movie was one of a number of gay-themed films being made in Hollywood at the time, the others being Making Love and Deathtrap. According to Burrows, Francis Veber "wanted it to be apparent that John's character was gay. He wanted to advance the gay rights movement, which was still taboo as a film subject in 1981. In the original script and cut of the film Hurt's character Kerwin commits suicide "because his life was so sad," said Veber. "We shot the scene but when people saw the film they had grown to like Hurt so much that by the point that the suicide came as too much of a shock, so we took it out. In France it would have been quite acceptable. I found that interesting." Burrows wrote "after the experience, I knew that feature films were not in my wheelhouse."

== Reception ==
Rex Reed, writing for the New York Post, panned the film, saying, "Hollywood's latest crime against humanity in general and homosexuals in particular is a dumb creepshow called Partners – stupid, tasteless and homophobic, this sleazy, superficial film implies that gay cops can't be trusted to work with straight cops because they might fall in love with them." Gene Siskel was also offended and later called it one of the worst films of 1982. In 1989 O'Neal was nominated for a Golden Raspberry Award as Worst Actor of the Decade for his performances in this film, Fever Pitch, So Fine and Tough Guys Don't Dance at the 10th Golden Raspberry Awards.

In his book The Celluloid Closet published in 1985, film historian and LGBT activist Vito Russo wrote that "this comedy of a straight cop and a gay cop infiltrating the gay community in order to catch a killer was insensitive to the point of slander". He criticized the stereotypes presented in the movie, stating that "John Hurt is a terrified closet case who can't even hold a gun without dropping it or raise his voice above a timid whisper", and he also questioned the casting choices, referring to Ryan O'Neil as a "world-class homophobe". When asked if the film drew any complaints from gay men during filming, John Hurt said, "They didn't like it that I was wearing a lilac-colored track suit in it. They say homosexuals do not necessarily do that. And the person who's saying this is sitting there in a pink track suit, It's a crazy world we live in."

The film was a financial failure. Head of Paramount Barry Diller later said "Partners was the essence of a badly made movie, partly because it was rushed against a date." An Vulture article noted the film's comparison in story terms to Cruising, observing "Where Cruising has been rediscovered and embraced, Partners remains defiantly and appropriately unloved, a movie that was dismissed as a tacky and offensive exploitation of retrograde stereotypes at the time of its release and whose reputation hasn’t exactly improved in the ensuing decades."

== Soundtrack ==
Partners: Music from the Motion Picture Composed and Conducted by Georges Delerue

Soundtrack album by Georges Delerue
- Released: March 20, 2014
- Recorded: 1982
- Studios: Record Plant; Evergreen
- Length: 53:04
- Label: Quartet Records
- Producer: Georges Delerue

Partners: Music from the Motion Picture Composed and Conducted by Georges Delerue is the soundtrack album from the film, released on March 20, 2014 by Spanish label Quartet Records. The album, released on limited edition CD units, contains 21 tracks composed and conducted by Georges Delerue, plus 3 bonus tracks.

Critic James Southall describes the soundtrack as "typical of [Delerue's] work on American movies at the time – light, airy, wonderfully tuneful and very enjoyable", and concluded that it was "never unappealing."

=== Track listing ===
All music arranged and conducted by Georges Delerue. All music composed by Georges Delerue, except bonus tracks.

| No. | Title | Writer(s) | Length |
|---|---|---|---|
| 1. | "Partners Theme" | | 2:14 |
| 2. | "1M2 / 1M3" | | 2:02 |
| 3. | "Meet Hardelstam" | | 1:21 |
| 4. | "3M1" | | 1:11 |
| 5. | "M51" | | 1:08 |
| 6. | "I Need Some Air" | | 1:36 |
| 7. | "The First Clue" | | 1:41 |
| 8. | "M52" | | 1:01 |
| 9. | "The Market" | | 2:01 |
| 10. | "Domestic Scene" | | 3:14 |
| 11. | "M61 / M62" | | 1:02 |
| 12. | "8M4" | | 1:48 |
| 13. | "Where’s Everyone?" | | 2:06 |
| 14. | "The Bait" | | 4:40 |
| 15. | "10M1 / 10M3" | | 1:26 |
| 16. | "Thanks Kerwin" | | 1:32 |
| 17. | "Kerwin Searches House / Close Encounters / The Invitation" | | 3:30 |
| 18. | "Kerwin’s Suspicion" | | 1:44 |
| 19. | "Find Benson / I Want The Negatives" | | 3:48 |
| 20. | "I’m No Crying" | | 1:36 |
| 21. | "Partners Theme" | | 1:08 |
| 22. | "In The Mood" (bonus track) | Andy Razaf; Joseph Garland | 3:34 |
| 23. | "Moonlight Serenade" (bonus track) | Glenn Miller; Mitchell Parish | 3:36 |
| 24. | "Tuxedo Junction" (bonus track) | Julian Dash; Buddy Feyne; Erskine Hawkins; William Johnson | 3:07 |
| Total length: | | | 53:04 |
