= Chopper Chicks in Zombietown =

1989 film

- "Chopper Chicks in Zombietown" film poster
- Directed by: Dan Hoskins
- Written by: Dan Hoskins
- Produced by: Maria Snyder
- Starring: Jamie Rose; Catherine Carlen; Lycia Naff; Vicki Frederick; Kristina Loggia; Martha Quinn; Don Calfa
- Cinematography: Tom Fraser
- Edited by: W. O. Garrett
- Music by: Daniel May
- Production companies: Mach Studios; BlondMax
- Distributed by: Troma Entertainment
- Release date: October 1989
- Running time: 86 minutes
- Country: United States
- Language: English

Chopper Chicks in Zombietown (formerly known as Chrome Hearts and Cycle Sluts Vs. the Zombie Ghouls) is a 1989 American comedy horror film written and directed by Dan Hoskins. It was released by Troma and features early roles by Billy Bob Thornton and Hal Sparks before they became famous. Former MTV veejay Martha Quinn also appears.

In the film, an evil scientist has been using zombies as a labor force for his radioactive mine, but the zombies are released by an intruder and then go on a rampage. A female motorcycle gang decides to eliminate the zombies and to rescue the town.

== Plot ==
The film is about an all-female motorcycle gang named the "Cycle Sluts", who cruise into the isolated town of Zariah, while looking for a good time. Here, an evil scientist-turned-mortician has been killing local townspeople with the aid of his long-suffering dwarf assistant and turning them into zombies to use as labor at an abandoned mine. The mine is too radioactive after underground nuclear testing to be mined by living people. Although the scientist later admits that the real reason he has been doing it is not the money, but because he is just plain mean.

The zombies escape after a curious little boy removes the lock to explore the mine, becoming the zombies' first victim. Around this point, a bus-load of blind orphans become stranded just on the outskirts of town as their ride breaks down. Luckily their bus-driver always keeps an Uzi on the bus, "for sentimental reasons".

With vague memories of life to guide them, the zombies eventually find their way back to town and begin devouring live flesh. Going against the wishes of their leader and despite some rough treatment from the locals earlier in the film, the Cycle Sluts ride to the rescue and begin killing the zombies using chainsaws, baseball bats, welding torches, a garrote and a staple gun.

In the final scene, the Cycle Sluts use fresh meat to lure the remaining zombies to the town church, which they have packed with dynamite. They are now aided by the doctor's dwarf who has decided that there are better lines of work than being a henchman. With all the undead inside and the church sealed up, the timer goes off and the church goes up in flames, zombies and all. The Cycle Sluts are rewarded with a sack full of cash and induct the dwarf and several of the blind orphans as honorary Cycle Sluts. They then ride out of town with some of the men folk in tow (their new "bitches") and throw the sack of money to the wind.

== Cast ==
- Jamie Rose as Dede
- Catherine Carlen as Rox
- Lycia Naff as T. C.
- Vicki Frederick as Jewel
- Kristina Loggia as Jojo
- Gretchen Palmer as Rusty
- Martha Quinn as Mae Clutter
- Don Calfa as Ralph Willum
- Billy Bob Thornton as Donny
- Hal Sparks as Lance
- Ed Gale as Bob Littleton
- David Dohrmann as Kenny

== Reception ==
Variety called it "a surprisingly funny B-movie spoof with a feminist edge." Stephen Holden of The New York Times wrote, "Although Mr. Hoskins's screenplay has a few amusing jokes, the movie is seriously deficient in visual and verbal energy." Kevin Thomas of the Los Angeles Times wrote, "It's a deliciously trashy title, and thankfully it's not been wasted: This is a diverting piece of deliberate schlock with a healthy share of laughs that's just right for midnight-movie fare." Writing in The Zombie Movie Encyclopedia, academic Peter Dendle said that though the film has funny moments, it is overall "forced and overdone".
