= ...All the Marbles =

1981 film by Robert Aldrich

- Theatrical release poster
- Directed by: Robert Aldrich
- Written by: Rich Eustis; Mel Frohman
- Produced by: William Aldrich
- Starring: Peter Falk; Vicki Frederick; Laurene Landon; Burt Young; Tracy Reed
- Cinematography: Joseph F. Biroc
- Edited by: Richard Lane; Irving Rosenblum
- Music by: Frank De Vol
- Production company: Metro-Goldwyn-Mayer
- Distributed by: United Artists (United States/Canada); Cinema International Corporation (International)
- Release date: October 16, 1981
- Running time: 113 minutes
- Country: United States
- Language: English
- Budget: $9.3 million or $11.5 million
- Box office: $6.5 million (North America gross); 89,679 admissions (France) or $2.2 million

...All the Marbles (reissued as The California Dolls) is a 1981 American comedy-drama film about the trials and travails of a female wrestling tag team and their manager. It was directed by Robert Aldrich (his final film) and stars Peter Falk, Vicki Frederick and Laurene Landon, as well as Burt Young. The Pittsburgh Steeler hall of famer "Mean" Joe Greene plays himself.

The film is known outside the US as The California Dolls because "All the Marbles" is an American idiom which is largely unknown in other English speaking countries.

== Plot ==
Harry is the manager of a tag team of attractive female wrestlers, Iris and Molly. On the road, they all endure a number of indignities, including bad motels, small-time crooks and a mud-wrestling match while trying to reach Reno, Nevada, for a big event at the MGM Grand Hotel.

== Cast ==
- Peter Falk as Harry
- Vicki Frederick as Iris
- Laurene Landon as Molly
- Richard Jaeckel as Dudley
- Burt Young as Eddie Cisco
- John Hancock as John "Big John"
- Faith Minton as "Big Mama"
- Chick Hearn as Himself

== Production ==
=== Development ===
Aldrich said he wanted to make the film "because nobody's done anything about women's wrestling before."

"It's purely, totally commercial," added Aldrich. "It fits in with my philosophy, which is that the process is at best a craft, not art."

Aldrich says he was brought the story by Mel Frohman "and we stole the whole psychological drive and ending from Abe Polonsky's Body and Soul (1947)", a film on which Aldrich had been an assistant director.

Aldrich said the theme of that movie "was that the biggest damage you can suffer is the loss of self-esteem and a fall from grace. The struggle to regain that esteem will fuel any plot. You don't even have to win." Aldrich says he also stole from Body and Soul for the last act of The Longest Yard.

Aldrich said that "Rocky was Body and Soul except that an Italian fighter wins, and in the original, a Jewish fighter loses. We have here two girls and a manager of questionable credentials. All three have already fallen from grace, and they struggle to redeem their self esteem. Hopefully, it will take two funny hours to happen."

Leigh Chapman did some uncredited work on the script for a week.

The film was financed by MGM who had recent appointed David Begelman head of production and revitalized its movie-making operations. The film was announced in May 1980.

=== Casting ===
The film needed a male star. "I couldn't make Sister George in this market," said Aldrich around this time. "I couldn't make Baby Jane, Attack! or The Big Knife in this market. It used to be that the script was the big thing and the actor secondary. Now it's the star. And it's got to be a big star. Get Burt Reynolds and you can shoot the telephone book."

Aldrich says his son suggested Peter Falk, best known for Columbo. "I gave him the Bette Davis speech - a great hook for any actor," said Aldrich, referring to a technique he used to get Davis to star in Whatever Happened to Baby Jane. "It goes like this: 'Peter if this isn't the best script ever written for you put it in an envelope and sent it right back. But if it is the best, then lets make it. I don't want you to hear that you don't like that speech on page 16. It's either the best or it isn't. That rarely fails. You don't always get the picture made but you always get a positive reaction. Nobody's ego can withstand that sort of flattery."

Aldrich arranged a meeting with Falk and said he told him "This picture will earn you more money than you've ever made before. Just don't try rewriting the script or changing things around like you do with your pal John Cassavetes." Peter Falk signed to star in June.

For the female leads, Aldrich said "We made the decision to take actresses and turn them into wrestlers instead of vice-versa. If we were right, it will make the picture." He auditioned women and tested 20.

Among the young unknown actresses who auditioned, but did not receive a part, was Kathleen Turner. However while Turner was in Los Angeles to audition for Marbles she also managed to secure an audition for Body Heat, which turned her into a star.

The women auditioned for the female leads were narrowed to eight and were sent to wrestling school. (Another account says 12 actors were screen tested and four sent off to wrestling school).) Aldrich reportedly told the women "the two that wrestle the best get the parts."

One of the final women who auditioned was Vicki Fredrick, who appeared on Broadway in A Chorus Line and Dancin'. She remembers "There was incredible tension," at the end. "On graduation day, each girl did a five-minute match for the heads of MGM, and Mr. Aldrich and Peter Falk. Laurene Landon [a Canadian athletic fashion model] and I got the parts, and the other two girls didn't get anything. It was a win-lose situation. When Mr. Aldrich told me he wanted me to play Iris, he also said he wanted me to put on 10 pounds. 'You have a dancer's body,' he said, 'and you have to look like a lady wrestler.'"

"We picked the two best athletes," said Aldrich. He did add that "I think the public likes to see attractive people. I know I like to see attractive people. So if you're going to have two women wrestlers, why not have them attractive?"

The wrestlers were trained by the former women's world wrestling champion Mildred Burke.

=== Shooting ===
Second unit photography began November 5, 1980. Principal photography took place from November 14 to February 24, 1981, on location in Youngstown and Akron, Ohio; Chicago; Las Vegas; Reno; and Los Angeles. The last 19 days were just filming wrestling.

The film was produced by Aldrich's son William. His daughter Adell was second unit director, and his son Kelly was transportation supervisor. "This is not a very trustworthy town," said Aldrich. "So when you do business, why not keep it in your own family?"

Frederick later recalled filming the finale in Reno with 2,500 extras. "They didn't quite know what we would be doing, and when the match started, they began screaming, and it was incredible. I forgot we were filming; it became real to me. I didn't hurt anybody, or hit them incorrectly, but I started really wanting to win. It was just like being back onstage. You hear the applause, and you think, 'Oh, good. I did well.'"

Aldrich said "I hope this is going to be a fun picture, not a Big Knife, but then I thought Emperor of the North Pole was a fun picture, but nobody saw it, so maybe I was wrong. I'm not so sure what a fun picture is anymore, just as I no longer know what fun is, at least in this town. There's no working class any more in the industry. Every grip owns two or three apartments. It's just a job now for everybody. They leave the set, go to the bank, and then go home. No fun anymore. Let's hope this one will be."

Laurene Landon was upset when Robert Aldrich told her and Vicki Frederick there was going to be a nude scene. "We figured out a way that we could get away with not showing our breasts. When we were wrestling, we kept covering our breasts with the mud, or wrestling in the mud at the other girls to cover our breasts. We thought we got away with it. Well, we got a call from Aldrich the next morning in a rage. He was very angry that we didn't show our breasts. In addition to that, they struck the mud wrestling set the night before. He said 'I know what you two tricksters are up to. We're building the set all over again because of you two.' We had to go in there again and wrestle and show our breasts so to speak. I was mortified; I was so ashamed and embarrassed," Landon said.

== Reception ==
United Artists reportedly spent $7 million to promote the film.

"I'm 63 and I've had hits every 10 years, and I just hope I can function long enough to have one in the 90s," said Aldrich.

MGM was so confident in the film that two days before the release it announced it would make a sequel, titled California Dolls Go to Japan.

=== Critical reception ===
In his October 16, 1981, review in The New York Times, the film critic Vincent Canby singled out Falk for "one of his best performances".

=== Box office ===
The film began disappointingly at the box office, only making $1.7 million in its first week, putting sequel plans on hold.

According to Laurene Landon (who portrayed California Doll Molly), while the film did not perform well at the box office in the United States, it made a healthy profit in foreign markets, and producers were planning a sequel, set primarily in Japan, when Robert Aldrich's death put a halt to the project.

=== Awards ===
The film won Japan's Hochi Film Award for Best International Picture.
