= The Lonely Guy =

1984 film by Arthur Hiller

- Directed by: Arthur Hiller
- Screenplay by: Ed. Weinberger; Stan Daniels
- Adaptation by: Neil Simon
- Based on: The Lonely Guy's Book of Life by Bruce Jay Friedman
- Produced by: Arthur Hiller
- Starring: Steve Martin; Charles Grodin; Judith Ivey; Steve Lawrence; Robyn Douglass
- Cinematography: Victor J. Kemper
- Edited by: Raja Gosnell; William H. Reynolds
- Music by: Jerry Goldsmith
- Production company: Aspen Film Society
- Distributed by: Universal Pictures
- Release date: January 27, 1984
- Running time: 90 minutes
- Country: United States
- Language: English
- Box office: $5,718,573

The Lonely Guy is a 1984 American romantic comedy film directed by Arthur Hiller and starring Steve Martin. The screenplay is credited to Ed. Weinberger and Stan Daniels (of Taxi) as well as Neil Simon (for "adaptation"), and is based on the 1978 book The Lonely Guy's Book of Life by Bruce Jay Friedman.

Martin portrays a greeting card writer who goes through a period of bad luck with women. In his despair, he writes a book titled A Guide for the Lonely Guy, which changes his life. The film also stars Charles Grodin, Judith Ivey, and Steve Lawrence and features cameo appearances from Merv Griffin, Dr. Joyce Brothers, and Loni Anderson. The theme song, "Love Comes Without Warning," was performed by the band America.

== Plot ==
When shy Larry Hubbard, a greeting card writer, finds his girlfriend Danielle in bed with another man, he is forced to begin a new life as a "lonely guy." Larry befriends fellow "lonely guy" Warren, who is considering suicide.

After going through a period of terrible luck with women, Larry meets Iris, who has dated "lonely guys" before. She gives Larry her number but he repeatedly loses it due to a few mishaps.

When Warren decides to jump off the Manhattan Bridge, Larry goes to intercept him. Upon seeing Iris on the subway, Larry uses spray paint to tell her to meet him at the bridge and they prevent Warren from jumping off, thus leading to their first date. Iris explains that she has been married six times, most of them "lonely guys" who have left her, often having a problem (e.g., gambling). Despite falling in love with Larry, Iris is unsure about going further, so she breaks it off.

At the pit of his despair, Larry writes a book titled A Guide for the Lonely Guy, which is rampantly successful and catapults him into an entirely different experience of life. He becomes rich and famous and even his relationship with Iris can begin on a new basis. Unfortunately, Iris's insecurities return, saying that Larry is now too good for her. She leaves him twice, once after they try to have sex and again when they bump into each other on a cruise, where she falls in love with another friend of Larry, Jack.

Jack and Iris get married despite Larry running through the city, over the Queensboro Bridge, asking help from a traffic cop and accidentally breaking up a wedding at another church. In a reversal of fortune, it's Larry and not Warren who wants to jump off the bridge. Warren reassures Larry that he will find someone just like he did. Wishing that a twist of fate would bring the woman he loves back to him, Iris falls into his arms from the bridge. They then meet Warren's new girlfriend, who turns out to be Dr. Joyce Brothers. Larry states that he could not believe how well things ended and the four go on a double date.

== Cast ==
- Steve Martin as Larry Hubbard
- Charles Grodin as Warren Evans
- Judith Ivey as Iris
- Steve Lawrence as Jack Fenwick
- Robyn Douglass as Danielle
- Merv Griffin as himself
- Joyce Brothers as herself
- Beau Starr as 2nd Cop
- Julie K. Payne as rental agent
- Roger Robinson as greeting card supervisor
- Nicholas Mele as maître d’
- Loni Anderson as herself (uncredited)
- Hunt Block as Louise's date

== Production ==
The restaurant scene was supposed to include a waiter with a chainsaw who would cut the table for two in half but someone forgot to bring the chainsaw.

Catherine O'Hara auditioned for the role of Iris, but didn't get the part.

The scene in which Steve Martin runs across the 59th Street Bridge to Queens was filmed on location and Martin (who was a runner in real-life) made the run. He began his run on the Manhattan side of the bridge and then ran (mid lane) to Queensboro Plaza, then branching towards Astoria. Martin ran under the elevated N/W-Train Subway line, up 31st Street, meeting with a police officer on the corner of 31st and Newtown Avenue and all the way to 28th Avenue and 31st. Although edited out of actual sequence Martin eventually enters the old church (which still stands) at 51 31st Street, Astoria — only to realize he has interrupted the wrong wedding.

== Reception ==
Roger Ebert gave the film 1.5 stars out of 4 and called it "a dreary slog through morose situations, made all the worse by Martin's deadpan delivery, his slightly off-balance sense of timing, and his ability to make you cringe with his self-debasing smarminess." Gene Siskel of the Chicago Tribune awarded 3 stars out of 4 and wrote that the film "begins with so much promise and sustains its mood of goofy gloom for so long that it is a shame to see it run out of gas at the end," explaining that the film went nowhere with the subject of Larry's fame as a best-selling author. Janet Maslin of The New York Times stated, "It tries a little bit of everything, and winds up with an air of messy desperation." Kevin Thomas of the Los Angeles Times wrote that "'The Lonely Guy' seems a movie forever in search of the right tone," with "humor that is feeble at best." Variety declared it "Steve Martin's most naturalistic and least funny film comedy to date. Inevitably, some good laughs pop up here and there, but the dead air between them lasts much longer than ever before with Martin." Pauline Kael of The New Yorker described the film as "generally likable, but it makes you feel as if you were watching television ... I had the feeling that Hiller plows through a comedy script, shooting it diligently, right on schedule, whether the gags work or not."

On Rotten Tomatoes it holds a 50% rating based on 22 reviews. On Metacritic it has a score of 45% based on reviews from 10 critics, indicating "mixed or average reviews". Audiences polled by CinemaScore gave the film an average grade of "C+" on an A+ to F scale.

== See also ==
- List of American films of 1984
