= Herbie Goes Bananas =

1980 film directed by Vincent McEveety

- Theatrical release poster by Paul Wenzel
- Directed by: Vincent McEveety
- Written by: Don Tait
- Based on: Characters by Gordon Buford
- Produced by: Ron Miller
- Starring: Cloris Leachman; Charles Martin Smith; Stephan W. Burns; John Vernon; Elyssa Davalos; Joaquin Garay III; Harvey Korman
- Cinematography: Frank V. Phillips
- Edited by: Gordon D. Brenner
- Music by: Frank De Vol
- Production company: Walt Disney Productions
- Distributed by: Buena Vista Distribution
- Release date: June 27, 1980
- Running time: 93 minutes
- Country: United States
- Language: English
- Box office: $18 million

Herbie Goes Bananas is a 1980 American adventure comedy film directed by Vincent McEveety. It is the fourth in the Herbie film series. The ensemble cast includes Cloris Leachman, Charles Martin Smith, Stephan W. Burns, John Vernon, Elyssa Davalos, Joaquin Garay III, and Harvey Korman. The plot revolves around the further adventures of Herbie, a sentient Volkswagen Beetle race car, as he befriends Paco, an orphan whose pickpocketing ways get him entangled with both Herbie's new owners and a trio of dangerous Incan gold thieves.

Herbie Goes Bananas received mixed reviews from critics, and underperformed at the box office, with domestic earnings of $18 million. It was followed by the sitcom Herbie, the Love Bug in 1982.

== Plot ==
Picking up sometime after the Trans-France Race, Pete Stancheck has inherited Herbie from his uncle, Jim Douglas, and travels to Puerto Vallarta, Mexico with his friend Davy "D.J." Johns to retrieve the car. They get directions from Paco, a comically mischievous, orphaned pickpocket to the car lot. Unable to pay the holding fee due to Paco taking their wallets, the pair quickly leave in Herbie to find him. Elsewhere, Paco pickpockets one of the members of a trio of three villains who are planning to steal gold from some forgotten Inca ruins. The trio chase Paco after realizing the film showing the location of the gold is in the stolen wallet, but Pete and DJ catch him first.

Paco hides in Herbie's hood and is consequently loaded on the Sun Princess cruise ship, bound for Rio de Janeiro, where Pete and DJ plan to enter Herbie in the Brazil Grand Prêmio. En route, they meet an anthropology student named Melissa and her extravagant, eccentric aunt Louise, who is trying to find a husband for her niece. When Herbie wreaks havoc on board, Pete pretends to court Melissa, intending that her Aunt Louise will sponsor their race.

Meanwhile, Paco is discovered by the crew and locked in the hold by Captain Blythe. Herbie (whom Paco calls "Ocho") helps Paco escape, and they ruin the ship's costume party while trying to escape the crew. Captain Blythe has his men drop Herbie into the ocean as punishment for his actions, while Pete, DJ, Melissa and Aunt Louise are ordered off at the next port, Panama. At the dock, Paco evades the ship crew and the gold thieves, who are waiting for him. Soon after, the now rusty Herbie resurfaces from the ocean at the Panama Canal, and Paco rescues Herbie as he is about to drown in a nearby inlet.

After Herbie is resuscitated, Paco and Herbie go into the taxi business. The gold thieves soon find Paco and threaten to use an acetylene torch to cut up Herbie if Paco doesn't give them the film, which Paco put in Pete's wallet by mistake. Paco manages to get Pete's wallet, but as he and Herbie escape the men they are hailed by both Louise and Blythe. Melissa quickly commandeers a dilapidated bus so she, Pete, and DJ can go after them.

Herbie tries to hide from the men at a bullfighting arena, only for them to end up in the ring. After Herbie defeats the bull, he and Paco leave without Louise and Blythe, who are soon picked up by Pete, DJ and Melissa. Later at a café, Paco is grabbed by the men and taken aboard their plane. After failing to stop it from taking off, Herbie goes to find Pete and the others, who are stuck in a small village after the bus finally broke down.

As a rainstorm hits, the men retrieve a large gold disc from the ruins, planning to melt it down so they can hire equipment to get the rest. They abandon Paco to fend for himself, but Herbie finds him. After Paco explains the thieves' plans to Pete, Herbie chases after the men, catching the gold in his trunk.

Herbie and the group travel to the next major town (using bananas as camouflage) where Blythe and Louise go to get help while the others take the disc to the local university, where they are overpowered by the men. Paco is outside selling the bananas to locals when he and Herbie see the men loading the disc into their plane. Herbie throws the bananas at them before chasing the plane and 'biting' its tail off. After Herbie wrecks the rest of the plane, the villains are defeated by Herbie and Paco and arrested by the police.

The group reunite on the Sun Princess, where Pete and DJ resume their plans to enter a repainted and restored Herbie in the Brazil Grand Prêmio, albeit with Paco as the driver (Pete conceding that Paco and Herbie have a better connection than Pete would have if he drove Herbie himself). Aunt Louise once again tries to get Blythe to notice her, but he is more interested in a passing schooner. DJ finally asks Paco why he keeps referring to Herbie as "Ocho", since that is Spanish for eight. Paco looks at Herbie's "53" and remarks that 5 + 3 = 8. After that, Pete, Davy, Aunt Louise, and Melissa have a toast for Herbie to win the Brazil Grand Prêmio, with Paco giving a thumbs up.

== Cast ==
- Cloris Leachman as Aunt Louise Trends
- Charles Martin Smith as Davy "D.J." Johns
- John Vernon as Prindle
- Stephan W. Burns as Peter "Pete" Stancheck
- Elyssa Davalos as Melissa
- Joaquin Garay III as Paco
- Harvey Korman as Captain Blythe
- Richard Jaeckel as Shepard
- Alex Rocco as Quinn
- Fritz Feld as Chief Steward
- Vito Scotti as Armando Moccia
- Jose Gonzalez Gonzalez as Garage Owner
- Ruben Moreno as Store Owner
- Tina Menard as Store Owner's Wife
- Jorge Moreno as Bus Driver
- Allan Hunt as Canal Operator #1
- Tom Scott as Canal Operator #2
- Hector Morales as Mexican General
- Iris Adrian as Loud American Wife
- Ceil Cabot as Mrs. Purkiss
- Pat Van Patten as Cigarette Guest
- Jack Perkins as Loud American
- Henry Slate as Off-Watch Officer
- Ernie Fuentes as Native
- Antonio Trevino as Pigeon Owner
- Dante D'Andre as Dr. De Moraes
- Alma Beltran as General's Wife
- Dolores Aguirre as General's Daughter #1
- Aurora Coria as General's Daughter #2
- Alex Tinne as Local #1
- Don Diamond as Local #2
- Warde Donovan as Maitre d'
- Ray Victor as Guard Attendant
- Bert Santos as Policeman #3
- Buddy Joe Hooker as Chef
- Steve Boyum as Panama Policeman
- Kenny Endoso as Mexican Policeman
- Mario Cisneros as Puetro Vallarta Policeman
- Jeff Ramsey as The Matador
- John Meier as Ship's Officer

== Music ==
The score for Herbie Goes Bananas was written by Frank De Vol. Two original songs appear in the film, both written by Frank De Vol, as well. Look at Me is played as Pete dances with Melissa at the cruise ship's costume party. After Paco rescues Herbie who resurfaced after being dropped into the sea by Captain Blythe, "I Found a New Friend" plays as the two drive through the open road of Panama. The song is reprised over the end credits.

== Reception ==
Herbie Goes Bananas was met with mixed reviews, and is widely considered to be the weakest film in the Herbie franchise. Most film critics remarked that the series felt tired, and had run its course, with Leonard Maltin commenting that there was "one amusing scene where the VW turns matador; otherwise, strictly scrap metal." Maltin (who rated the film 1½ out of 4) added that the plot dealt with its cast "encountering all sorts of 'hilarious' obstacles along the way." Phil Patton, author of the book Bug: The Strange Mutations of the World's Most Famous Automobile, observed that the Herbie franchise was "a game of diminishing returns: Herbie Goes Bananas...is filled with 'south of the border' clichés and stereotypes." The film has a 40% rating on the website Rotten Tomatoes, while on Metacritic, it has a weighted average score of 55 out of 100 based on 4 critic reviews, indicating "mixed or average" reviews.

== Cars ==
The prop Herbie dropped into the ocean was never retrieved, the car is somewhere between Laz Paz and Baja California and wasn't a proper car, as it had some wooden parts. A total of 26 VW Beetles were used, by reason of the quantity of stunts and tricks.

== Novelization ==
A paperback novelization of the film was written by Joe Claro and published by Scholastic Paperbacks in July 1980 to coincide with the film's release.

== Home media ==
Herbie Goes Bananas was released by Walt Disney Home Video through VHS in November 1984, and was re-released on November 6, 1985. It was first released on DVD in Region 1 on May 4, 2004, and re-released on DVD on September 2, 2012, as part of Herbie: 4-Movie Collection with The Love Bug, Herbie Rides Again and Herbie Goes to Monte Carlo.

On June 30, 2015, Herbie Goes Bananas was released on Blu-ray Disc as a Disney Movie Club exclusive title.
