= Vicki Frederick =

American actress (b. 1949)

Vicki Frederick (born January 2, 1949) is an American actress and dancer who has appeared in a number of musicals on Broadway plays, in films, and on popular TV shows such as Mork and Mindy and Happy Days in 1979, and Murder She Wrote in 1990.

== Life and career ==
Frederick was a protégé of Bob Fosse, dancing in the ensemble and lead roles in his Broadway productions of Pippin (1972), and Dancin' (1978).

She starred in Robert Aldrich's final film ...All the Marbles (1981), and in the 1984 rock musical film Body Rock, and had a bit part in Fosse's 1979 film All That Jazz. Frederick may be most remembered for her role as the sassy, elegant, long-haired dancer Sheila Bryant in the 1985 movie adaptation A Chorus Line.

== Films and TV ==
Film
Year	Title	Role	Notes
1979	All That Jazz	Menage Partner #1	
1980	Coast to Coast	Woman Golfer	
1981	...All the Marbles	Iris	by Robert Aldrich
1984	Body Rock	Claire	
1985	A Chorus Line	Sheila Bryant	
1986	Stewardess School	Miss Grummet	
1989	Chopper Chicks in Zombietown	Jewel	
1991	Scissors	Nancy Leahy	
1992	Chaplin	Party Guest #1	Frederick took no rolling credit for this film
Television
Year	Title	Role	Notes
1979	Happy Days	Helga	1 episode
1979	Laverne & Shirley	Helga	1 episode
1979	Mork & Mindy	Sutra	2 episodes
1990	Murder, She Wrote	Claire Hastings	1 episode
1990	Dream On	Valerie Knox	1 episode

== Broadway ==
- Minnie's Boys (1970)
- The Rothschilds (1970–1972)
- Pippin (1972)
- Tricks (1973)
- Cyrano (1973)
- The Pajama Game (1973–1974)
- A Chorus Line (Cassie) (1977)
- Dancin' (1978)
- A Chorus Line (Sheila) (1985)
