= Manta Cars =

American automobile manufacturer

Manta Mirage
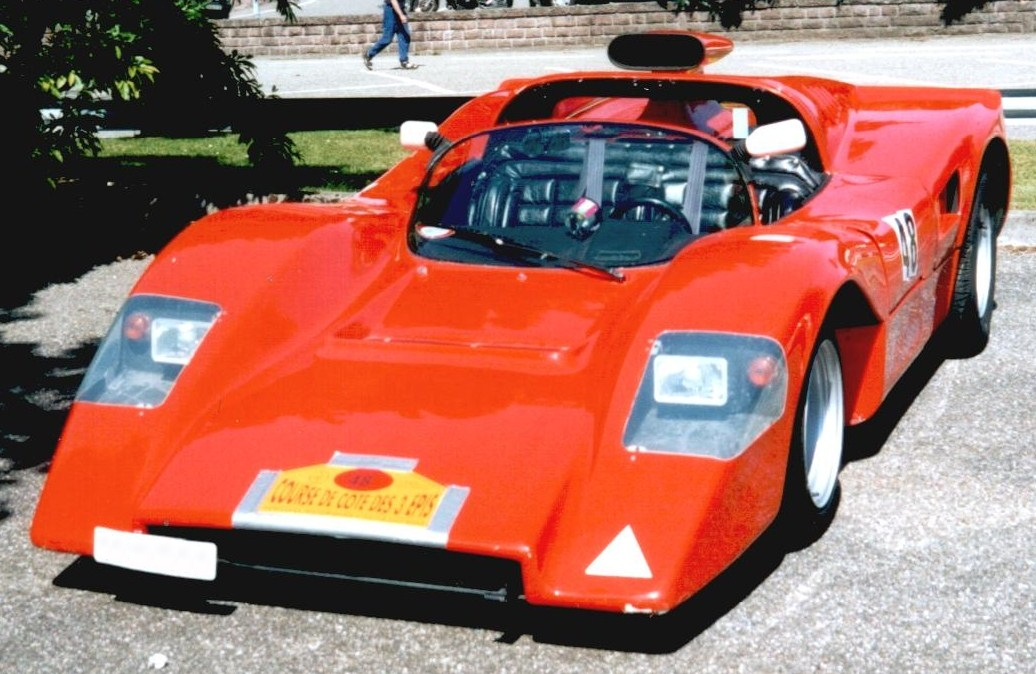

Overview
- Manufacturer: Manta Cars
- Production: 1974-1986
- Designer: Brad LoVette

Body and chassis
- Class: Sports car
- Layout: RMR layout

Powertrain
- Engine: Chevrolet small-block V8
- Transmission: Chevrolet Corvair transaxle

Dimensions
- Wheelbase: 96 in (2,438 mm)
- Length: 160 in (4,064 mm)
- Width: 75 in (1,905 mm)
- Height: 39 in (991 mm)
- Curb weight: From 1,900 lb (862 kg) with engine

Manta Cars was owned and operated by American brothers Brad and Tim LoVette, and was located in Costa Mesa, California, from 1974 to 1986 (Manta Cars moved their production facility and showroom to 2914 Halladay Avenue, Santa Ana, California in 1979). Manta produced the Manta Mirage, and later produced other component kit cars, including the rear-engine Volkswagen Beetle-based Manta Montage, and the mid-engine Montage-T, which had a custom space frame chassis and used GM X-body V6 drivetrains. The Montage-T recreated the elusive McLaren M6GT.

A very accurate reproduction of the classic 1953 Corvette was to be added to their product line, and although a prototype was built, Manta Cars ceased production in 1986, having sold about 750 factory-built and component cars. The Manta Mirage was an American mid-engine vehicle produced by Manta Cars. The Mirage, originally referred to as just the "Manta", or the "Manta Can-Am", was a lightweight, road-legal racing car. The Mirage's steel space frame chassis was fitted with a high-output V8 engine and four-speed transaxle. Most Mirages were equipped with 327 cu in (5.36 L) or 350 cu in (5.7 L) Chevrolet small-block V8 engines, and several vehicles were fitted with 454 cu in (7.44 L) V8s sourced from Chevrolet, as well as 460 cu in (7.5 L) V8 engines sourced from Ford. The original Mirage design mated the Chevy V8 to a Corvair transaxle via a Kelmark adapter and remote shifter. The bodywork was all hand-laid fiberglass, colored in a range of gel-coat colors. Gull-wing doors were fitted to a removable top section, while the doors flip forward for entry. With curb weights as light as 1,900 lb (860 kg), the cars could be built by the factory or their owners to be extremely fast.

== Media appearances ==
The Mirage was one of the 48 cars stolen in the original 1974 movie version of Gone In 60 Seconds, directed by H.B. Halicki. The same Mirage made an appearance in Halicki's 1983 film Deadline Auto Theft.

A Montage appeared in the 1991 movie Highway To Hell. A Manta Mirage is modified in the History Channels Counting Cars episode "Red, Hot and Dangerous".

Although the cars look very similar, a modified Manta Montage was NOT used in the 1983 TV show Hardcastle and McCormick. The Coyotes in Hardcastle and McCormick were built by Mike Fennel and Unique Movie Cars. Both the Montage and Mike Fennel's Coyote used molds pulled from the same source car.

Manta Mirages do not appear in the 1975 movie Death Race 2000. These cars were a basic Canam style built on a VW pan, and were built by Dick Dean.

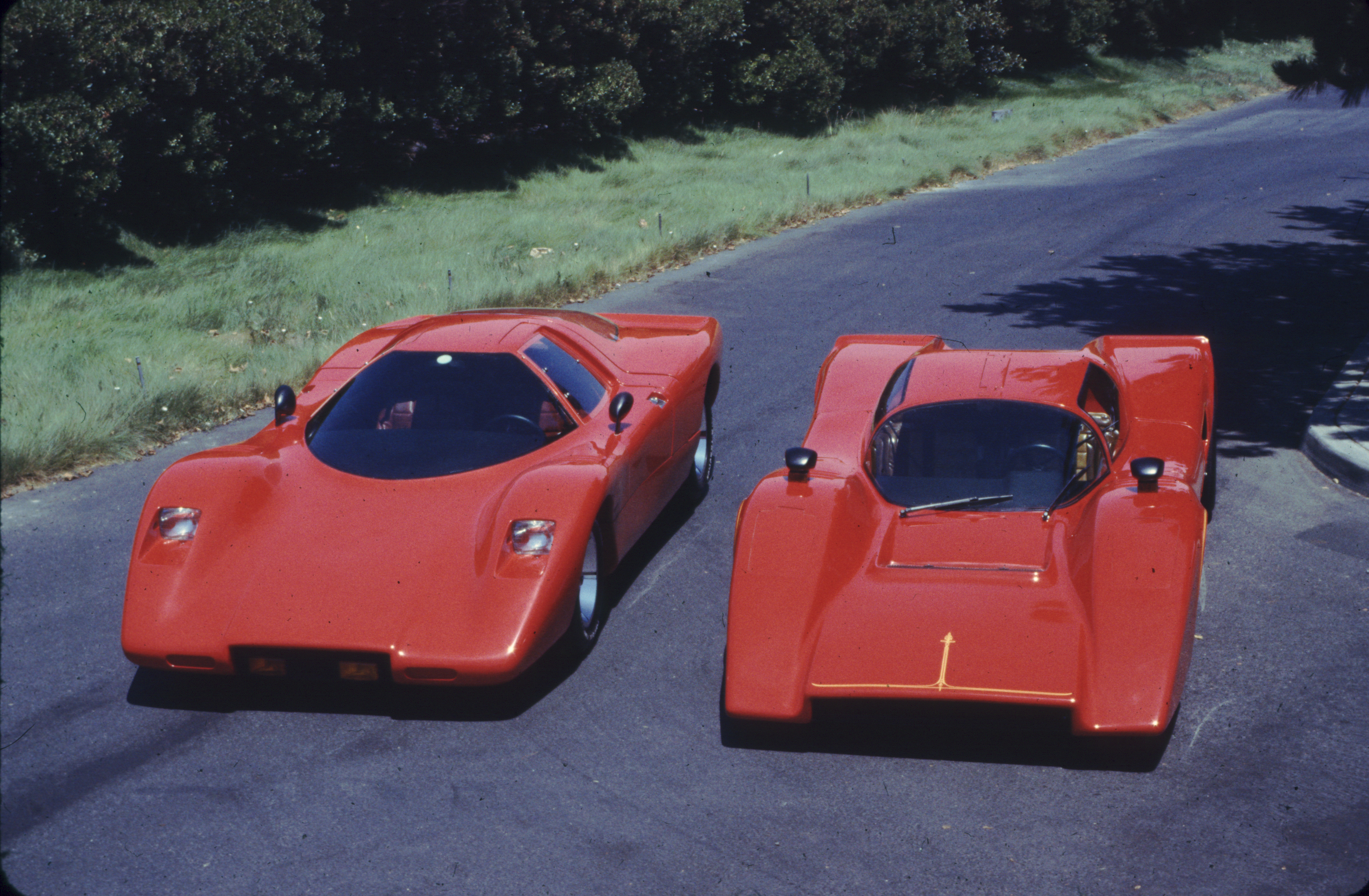
Montage (L) & Mirage (R)

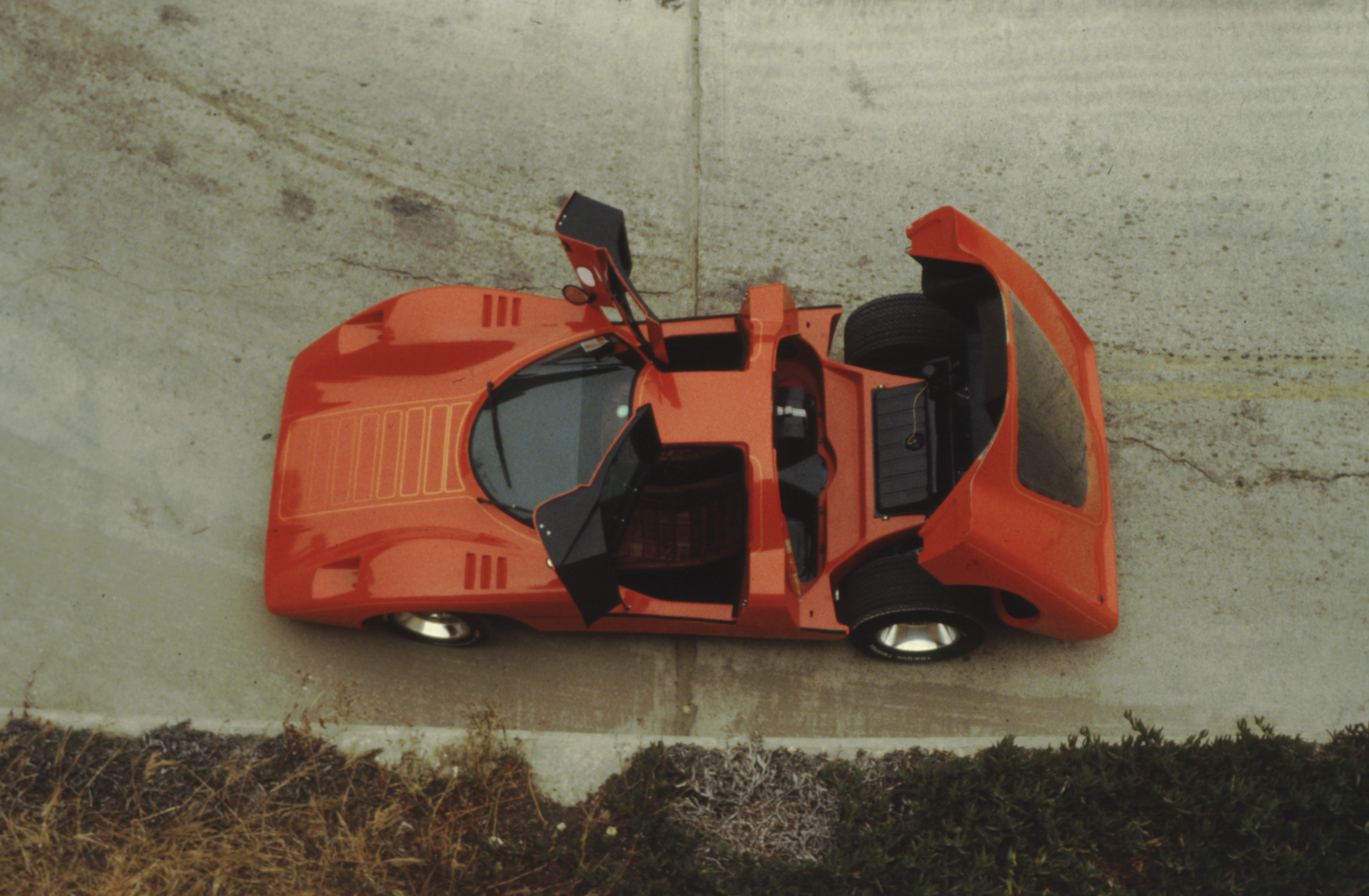
Manta Montage

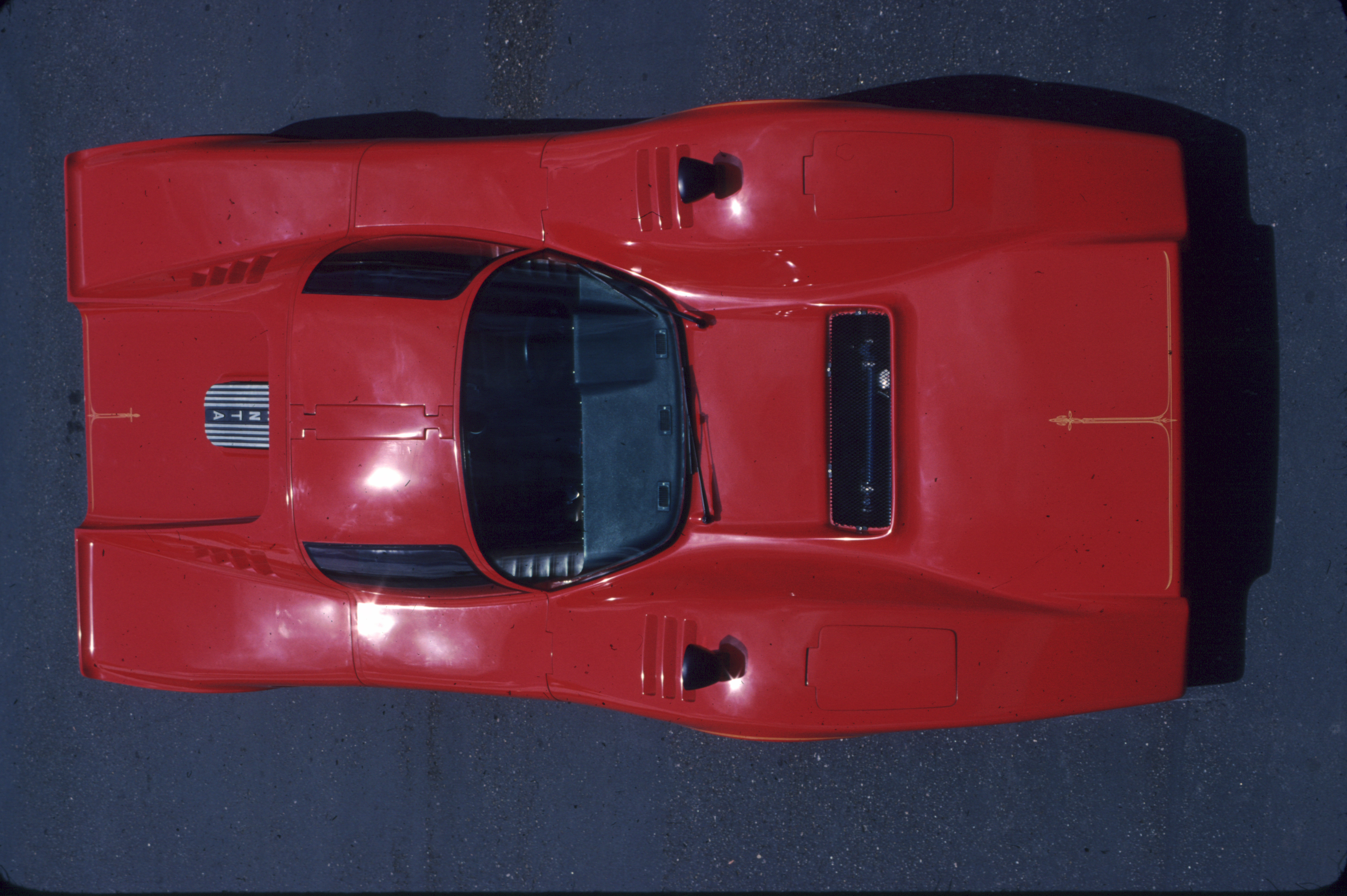
Manta Mirage
