= Junkman =

Junkman may refer to:

- Junkman (baseball term)
- Randy "Junkman" Jones (1950–2025), American baseball player
- The Junkman, 1982 independent action comedy film
- Junk man, person who collects unwanted items to resell
