= Warner E. Leighton =

American film, sound, music, effects and supervising editor

- Born: July 31, 1930
- Died: March 20, 2005 (aged 74)
- Occupations: film, sound, music, effects and supervising editor
- Notable work: edited many William Hanna and Joseph Barbera cartoons
- Spouse(s): Patricia Relyea (m. early 1950s), Margaret (P.J.) Webb (m. 1984)
- Children: 2 daughters

Warner Elvon Leighton (July 31, 1930 – March 20, 2005) was an American film, sound, music, effects and supervising editor. An only child, he married Patricia Relyea in the early 1950s. He had two daughters with Patricia; Denise was born in 1955 and Cynthia was born in 1958. He also had one Grandson, Kyler, born in 1993. Later, he married Margaret (P.J.) Webb on March 3, 1984. During the 1960s, Leighton edited many William Hanna and Joseph Barbera cartoons such as The Flintstones, The Jetsons, Atom Ant, Scooby-Doo, The Secret Squirrel Show, Jonny Quest, Hey There, It's Yogi Bear, and Space Ghost. He also edited a lot of Jack Kirby and Stan Lee cartoons such as Fantastic Four, and Doug Wildey cartoons such as Jonny Quest.

Leighton edited the film Gone in 60 Seconds. There was no official script for the film, apart from several pages outlining main dialog sequences. Much of the action/dialog was improvised and made up by the cast and crew as they went along. This caused many problems for Leighton, who never knew what footage was being dumped on him or where in the movie it belonged. In the DVD audio commentary, he described the script for the construction site portion of the main pursuit as a piece of cardboard with a circle on it. Leighton edited the films The Junkman and Deadline Auto Theft for director H. B. Halicki.

Leighton edited several television films. He edited the film C.H.O.M.P.S., The American Dreamer for actor, director, producer, and stuntman Dennis Hopper, and Wolf Lake.

== Filmography ==
- That's My Mommy (1955)
- Good Will to Men (1955)
- The Flying Sorceress (1956)
- Busy Buddies (1956)
- Muscle Beach Tom (1956)
- Millionaire Droopy (1956)
- The Egg and Jerry (1956)
- Barbecue Brawl (1956)
- Blue Cat Blues (1956)
- Down Beat Bear (1956)
- Here Comes Tobor (1956)
- The Ruff & Reddy Show (1957)
- One Droopy Knight (1957)
- Tom's Photo Finish (1957)
- Blackboard Jumble (1957)
- Mucho Mouse (1957)
- Scat Cats (1957)
- Feedin' the Kiddie (1957)
- Grin and Share It (1957)
- Timid Tabby (1957)
- Give and Tyke (1957)
- Tops with Pops (1957)
- Cat's Meow (1957)
- The Huckleberry Hound Show (1958)
- Pixie & Dixie (1958)
- Tot Watchers (1958)
- Droopy Leprechaun (1958)
- Robin Hoodwinked (1958)
- The Vanishing Duck (1958)
- Mutts About Racing (1958)
- Royal Cat Nap (1958)
- Sheep Wrecked (1958)
- Happy Go Ducky (1958)
- South Seas Adventure (1958)
- The Flintstones (1960)
- Top Cat (1961)
- The Jetsons (1962)
- Wally Gator (1962)
- The New Hanna-Barbera Cartoon Series (1962)
- Whatcha Watchin' (1963)
- Hey There, It's Yogi Bear (1964)
- Magilla Gorilla (1964)
- Peter Potamus and His Magic Flying Balloon (1964)
- Jonny Quest (1964)
- The Hillbilly Bears (1965)
- Sinbad Jr. (1965)
- Tom and Jerry (1965)
- The Atom Ant Show (1965)
- The Secret Squirrel Show (1965)
- The Man Called Flintstone (1966)
- Space Ghost (1966)
- The Abbott and Costello Cartoon Show (1966)
- A Laurel and Hardy Cartoon (1966)
- The Peter Potamus Show (1966)
- The Space Kidettes (1966)
- Frankenstein Jr. and the Impossibles (1966)
- Birdman and the Galaxy Trio (1967)
- The Fantastic Four (1967)
- The Herculoids (1967)
- Shazzan (1967)
- We'll Take Manhattan (1967)
- Samson & Goliath (1967)
- Jack and the Beanstalk (1967)
- Moby Dick and the Mighty Mightor (1967)
- Scooby-Doo (1967)
- Gone in 60 Seconds (1974)
- C.H.O.M.P.S. (1979)
