= The Junkman =

- Theatrical release poster
- Directed by: H. B. Halicki
- Written by: H. B. Halicki
- Produced by: H. B. Halicki
- Starring: H. B. Halicki; Christopher Stone; Susan Shaw; Lang Jeffries; Hoyt Axton
- Cinematography: Jack Vacek; Dominic Sena
- Edited by: Warner E. Leighton; P. J. Webb
- Music by: Hoyt Axton; Freddy Cannon
- Distributed by: H.B. Halicki Junkyard and Mercantile Company
- Release date: August 28, 1982
- Running time: 98 minutes
- Country: United States
- Language: English
- Budget: $1,000,000

The Junkman Is a 1982 American independent action comedy film, which spent two years in production. To make the film, H. B. Halicki used his own personal collection of over 200 cars, toys, and guns—including Eleanor, the star of his 1974 cult classic Gone in 60 Seconds.

It is a sequel to Gone in 60 Seconds (1974) and the second installment in the Gone in 60 Seconds film series. It presents Gone in 60 Seconds and Deadline Auto Theft as films within a film. The opening car chase sequence, which involves a 1974 Bricklin SV-1, is part of Deadline Auto Theft's storyline.

In the film, a man hires contract killers and tasks them with killing his brother-in-law, who he resents. The target figures out that he has an enemy within his own company, but still wants to attend the premiere of his recently completed film.

== Plot ==
Harlan B. Hollis struggles to stay alive when a jealous public relations manager hires a team of assassins to kill him. The manager, also Hollis' brother-in-law, resents Hollis for making the film Gone in 60 Seconds, which is premiering at the Cinerama Dome.

The film starts with the head hitman Frank Spyros answering a pay phone and getting instructions from a then unknown person to go ahead with a hit on Hollis as he drives to the James Dean Festival in Cholame, California. The same unknown person plays a video highlighting Hollis's life. He ejects the video and crumples up a publicity shot of Hollis.

Later, Hollis is shown a picture found in the burned wreckage of one of the air covers' planes. Hollis identifies it as an unreleased publicity shot, indicating someone from inside of his own company is trying to kill him.

With the aid of the Goodyear Blimp, he travels to the Cinerama Dome, where the premiere is being held. He discovers the mystery man to be Fox, who subsequently slips off the edge of the theater roof. Clark's crew find the bomb in the limo, throw it into a parking lot, and it explodes, blowing up several cars in the process.

At the end of the film, Hollis gives his daughter Kelly a new 1982 Pontiac Trans Am for her birthday.

== Cast ==
Actor	Role
H. B. "Toby" Halicki	Harlan B. Hollis / Maindrian Pace
Christopher Stone	Michael Fox
Susan Shaw	Susan Clark
Lang Jeffries	Arthur Wheeler
Bruce Cameron	Bruce
Jack Vacek	Jack
Richard L. Muse	Richard Hill
Dan Grimaldi	Larry Bergleman
Kelly Busia	Kelly Hollis
Lynda Day George	Festival News Reporter
Dennis Stouffer	Dennis, The Security Man
Brian LaBonge	Brian
Judi Gibbs	Christine
Tony Ostermeier	"Air Cover"
Dave Logue	"Magnum"
Rita Rickard	"Blackbird", The Murderess
Mike Brennan	Festival MC / Nursery Truck Driver
Kopi Sotiropulos	Frank Spyros
Jewel Shepard	Gloria, The Present Girl
John Halicki	Man In Horse Carriage
Ronald Halicki	The Pig Man
Maureen Coddington	Female Police Dispatcher
Butch Stockton	Datsun Crash Policeman
Phil Boroff	Sergeant Gullen

== Production ==
Many locals were used as extras in the film. Most of the San Luis Obispo County sheriff deputies, Paso Robles, and Atascadero police officers in the movie were officers at the time of filming. All of the California Highway Patrol officers were professional stunt drivers. Hoyt Axton makes a special appearance as "Captain Gibbs"; his character would play a much larger role in Halicki's next film, Deadline Auto Theft (1983).

The fire fighting plane is a Fairchild C-119 Flying Boxcar.

The Junkman holds the Guinness World Record for wrecking over 150 cars, trucks, motorcycles and planes in one movie.

== Release ==
=== Home media ===
In 2001, Denice Shakarian Halicki, along with her business partner Michael Leone under the banner Halicki Films, released the restored film in Dolby 5.1 surround sound on DVD and VHS to American viewers. It included H. B. Halicki hosting a documentary about film making. In the DVD release, all of the rock and roll, country music soundtrack from the original film including title tracks have been replaced by a generic synthesizer music score. A number of dialogue changes were also made. The original version was released on video in the 1980s but is rare today.

== Sequel ==
A sequel titled Deadline Auto Theft, was released in 1983.
