= Dan Grimaldi =

American actor and mathematics professor

- Dan Grimaldi as Pasquale "Patsy" Parisi during a black-and-white style edit of The Sopranos
- Born: March 7, 1946 (age 80); Brooklyn, New York, U.S.
- Education: Fordham University (BS); New York University (MS); City University of New York (PhD)
- Occupations: Actor; Professor
- Years active: 1979–present

Dan Grimaldi (born March 7, 1946) is an American actor and mathematics professor who is known for his roles as twins Philly and Patsy Parisi on the HBO television series The Sopranos, various characters on Law & Order (1991–2001), Don't Go in the House (1979), The Junkman (1982), Men of Respect (1990), and The Yards (2000).

== Education ==
Grimaldi has a bachelor's degree in mathematics from Fordham University, a master's degree in operations research from New York University, and a PhD in data processing from the City University of New York, and teaches in the Department of Mathematics and Computer Science at Kingsborough Community College in Brooklyn, New York.

== Career ==
In addition to his role on The Sopranos, he has also had some minor film credits, most notably as mother-fixated pyromaniac Donny Kohler in the 1980 slasher film Don't Go in the House, and some guest TV appearances, including several episodes on Law & Order as well as appearing in 2011 as Tommy Barrone Sr. in "Moonlighting", the 9th episode of the 2nd season of the CBS show Blue Bloods. He appeared as an executive in the 2000 film The Yards and Grimaldi also voices "Frank" for the video game Mafia.

== Filmography ==
=== Film ===
Year	Title	Role	Notes
1979	Don't Go in the House	Donny Kohler	
1981	Longshot	Cop #1	
1982	The Junkman	Larry Bergleman	
1983	Deadline Auto Theft	Carl	
1986	Joey	Ted	
1989	Mortal Sins	Giraldi	
1990	Men of Respect	Carmine	
1994	Crooklyn	Con Ed Man	
1994	North	Hot Dog Vendor	
1994	Daddy's Girl		Short film
1996	West New York	Police Captain	
1999	The Stand-In	Mr. Rosensweig	
2000	The Yards	Executive One	
2008	iMurders	Carmine Romano	
2009	Chasing the Green	Peter Allen	
2014	The Quitter	Michael Lembo	
2016	The Atlantic Motel	William	Short film

=== Television ===
Year	Title	Role	Notes
1991–2001	Law & Order	Various	5 episodes
1991	The Days and Nights of Molly Dodd	Waiter	1 episode
1997	New York Undercover	Mike Waites	1 episode
1998	NYPD Blue	Joe Latona	TV series; 1 episode
1999	Third Watch	Bartender	TV series; 1 episode
2000–2007	The Sopranos	Patsy Parisi / Philly Parisi	47 episodes
2003	Dragnet	Alvin Moresco	1 episode
2011	Blue Bloods	Tommy Barrone Sr.	1 episode

=== Video games ===
Year	Title	Role	Notes
2002	Mafia	Frank Colletti	(voice)
