= Hardcastle and McCormick =

American crime drama television series (1983–1986)

- Title screen from season 1 and from the last ten episodes of season 2
- Genre: Crime drama; Action
- Created by: Stephen J. Cannell; Patrick Hasburgh
- Starring: Brian Keith; Daniel Hugh Kelly
- Country of origin: United States
- Original language: English
- No. of seasons: 3
- No. of episodes: 67

Production
- Executive producers: Stephen J. Cannell; Patrick Hasburgh
- Producers: Lawrence Hertzog; Les Sheldon
- Running time: 60 minutes per episode
- Production company: Stephen J. Cannell Productions

Original release
- Network: ABC
- Release: September 18, 1983 – May 5, 1986

Hardcastle and McCormick is an American action crime drama television series that aired on ABC from September 18, 1983, through May 5, 1986. The series stars Brian Keith as Judge Milton C. Hardcastle and Daniel Hugh Kelly as ex-con and race car driver Mark "Skid" McCormick.

During an interview in the early 1980s, producer Stephen J. Cannell referred to the then-upcoming series as Rolling Thunder.

By September 1985, domestic distribution rights to the series were sold to Columbia Pictures Television. Its successor, Sony Pictures Television, still holds these rights to this day.

== Premise ==
Los Angeles County Superior Court Judge Milton C. "Hardcase" Hardcastle is an eccentric judge notorious for being strict with the law in both his duties and towards defendants. Preparing for his retirement, he notices file drawers filled with 200 people who escaped conviction due to legal technicalities. Inspired by his childhood hero the Lone Ranger, Hardcastle desires to make the criminals answer for their crimes.

Mark McCormick is a smart-mouthed, streetwise car thief. He faces a long incarceration for his latest theft, a prototype sports car called the Coyote X, designed by his murdered best friend. Together, the judge and the car thief strike a deal in which Hardcastle helps McCormick catch the murderer and McCormick agrees to work (his conditional parole) as the judge's agent. In addition, McCormick is allowed to keep the Coyote, which proves to be an excellent pursuit vehicle for their needs.

== Cast ==
- Brian Keith as Judge Milton C. "Hardcase" Hardcastle
- Daniel Hugh Kelly as "Skid" Mark McCormick
- Mary Jackson as Sarah Wicks (1983)
- John Hancock as Lt. Michael Delaney (1984–85)
- Ed Bernard as Lt. Bill Giles (1984–85)
- Joe Santos as Lt. Frank Harper (1985–86)
- John Ashley as narrator during show opening

== Episodes ==
=== Season 1 (1983–84) ===
No. overall	No. in season	Title	Directed by	Written by	Original release date
1	1	"Rolling Thunder"	Roger Young	Patrick Hasburgh & Stephen J. Cannell	September 18, 1983
2	2	"Rolling Thunder"	Roger Young	Patrick Hasburgh & Stephen J. Cannell	September 18, 1983
3	3	"Man in a Glass House"	Guy Magar	Stephen J. Cannell	September 25, 1983
4	4	"The Crystal Duck"	Bruce Kessler	Stephen Katz	October 2, 1983
5	5	"Goin' Nowhere Fast"	Guy Magar	Patrick Hasburgh	October 9, 1983
6	6	"The Black Widow"	Richard Compton	Stephen J. Cannell	October 16, 1983
7	7	"The Boxer"	Tony Mordente	Patrick Hasburgh	October 23, 1983
8	8	"Once Again with Vigorish"	Arnold Laven	Patrick Hasburgh	October 30, 1983
9	9	"Killer B's"	Ron Satlof	Stephen Katz	November 6, 1983
10	10	"The Prince of Fat City"	Tony Mordente	Patrick Hasburgh	November 13, 1983
11	11	"Hotshoes"	Richard Compton	Patrick Hasburgh	November 27, 1983
12	12	"Flying Down to Rio"	Tony Mordente	Stephen Katz	December 4, 1983
13	13	"Just Another Round of That Old Song"	Allen Reisner	Patrick Hasburgh	December 11, 1983
14	14	"Third Down and Twenty Years to Life"	Georg Stanford Brown	Evan Lawrence	January 1, 1984
15	15	"Whistler's Pride"	Tony Mordente	Stephen Katz	January 8, 1984
16	16	"Mr. Hardcastle Goes to Washington"	Arnold Laven	Patrick Hasburgh	January 15, 1984
17	17	"School for Scandal"	Tony Mordente	Tom Blomquist	January 29, 1984
18	18	"The Georgia Street Motors"	Joseph Manduke	Shel Willens	February 5, 1984
19	19	"The Homecoming: Part One"	Tony Mordente	Patrick Hasburgh	March 4, 1984
20	20	"The Homecoming: Part Two"	Bruce Kessler	Patrick Hasburgh	March 11, 1984
21	21	"Did You See the One that Got Away?"	Ron Satlof	Lawrence Hertzog	March 18, 1984
22	22	"Really Neat Cars and Guys with a Sense of Humor"	Ron Satlof	Lawrence Hertzog	March 25, 1984
23	23	"Scared Stiff"	Tony Mordente	Tom Blomquist	April 1, 1984

=== Season 2 (1984–85) ===
No. overall	No. in season	Title	Directed by	Written by	Original release date
24	1	"Outlaw Champion"	Leo Penn	Patrick Hasburgh	September 23, 1984
25	2	"Ties My Father Sold Me"	Ron Satlof	Patrick Hasburgh	September 30, 1984
26	3	"You Would Cry, Too, If It Happened to You"	Tony Mordente	Lawrence Hertzog	October 7, 1984
27	4	"D-Day"	Bruce Kessler	Lawrence Hertzog	October 14, 1984
28	5	"Never My Love"	Bruce Kessler	Thomas E. Szollosi & Richard Christian Matheson	October 28, 1984
29	6	"Whatever Happened to Guts?"	Michael Hiatt	Thomas E. Szollosi & Richard Christian Matheson	November 4, 1984
30	7	"You and the Horse You Rode in On"	Patrick Hasburgh	Patrick Hasburgh	November 18, 1984
31	8	"One of the Girls from Accounting"	Bruce Kessler	Stephen J. Cannell	November 25, 1984
32	9	"It Coulda Been Worse, She Coulda Been a Welder"	Tony Mordente	Lawrence Hertzog	December 2, 1984
33	10	"Hate the Picture, Love the Frame"	Dennis Donnelly	Erica Byrne	December 9, 1984
34	11	"Pennies from a Dead Man's Eyes"	Tony Mordente	Marianne Clarkson	December 31, 1984
35	12	"There Goes the Neighborhood"	Ron Satlof	Lawrence Hertzog	January 7, 1985
36	13	"Too Rich and Too Thin"	Michael J. Kane	T : Ross Thomas; S/T : Richard Christian Matheson & Thomas E. Szollosi	January 14, 1985
37	14	"What's So Funny?"	Tony Mordente	Patrick Hasburgh	January 21, 1985
38	15	"Hardcastle, Hardcastle, Hardcastle and McCormick"	Kim Manners	Lawrence Hertzog	February 4, 1985
39	16	"The Long Ago Girl"	Richard A. Colla	Stephen J. Cannell	February 11, 1985
40	17	"You Don't Hear the One that Gets You"	Tony Mordente	Lawrence Hertzog	February 18, 1985
41	18	"The Birthday Present"	Tony Mordente	Stephen J. Cannell	February 25, 1985
42	19	"Surprise on Seagull Beach"	Michael O'Herilhy	Michael O'Herlihy	March 4, 1985
43	20	"Undercover McCormick"	Les Sheldon	Marianne Clarkson	March 11, 1985
44	21	"The Game You Learn from Your Father"	Kim Manners	Patrick Hasburgh	March 18, 1985
45	22	"Angie's Choice"	Bruce Kessler	Thomas E. Szollosi & Richard Christian Matheson	April 1, 1985

=== Season 3 (1985–86) ===
No. overall	No. in season	Title	Directed by	Written by	Original release date
46	1	"She Ain't Deep, But She Sure Runs Fast"	Tony Mordente	Patrick Hasburgh	September 23, 1985
47	2	"Faster Hearts"	Charles Picerni	Patrick Hasburgh	September 30, 1985
48	3	"The Yankee Clipper"	Sigmund Neufeld, Jr.	Patrick Hasburgh	October 7, 1985
49	4	"Something's Going On on This Train"	Tony Mordente	Lawrence Hertzog	October 14, 1985
50	5	"The Career Breaker"	Kim Manners	Stephen J. Cannell	October 28, 1985
51	6	"Do Not Go Gently"	Bruce Kessler	Patrick Hasburgh	November 4, 1985
52	7	"Games People Play"	Peter Kiwitt	S : Tony Michelman & Scott J. Schneid; T : Carol Mendelsohn & Larry Forrester	November 11, 1985
53	8	"Strangle Hold"	Michael Switzer	Marianne Clarkson	November 18, 1985
54	9	"You're Sixteen, You're Beautiful and You're His"	Kim Manners	Lawrence Hertzog	November 25, 1985
55	10	"Mirage a Trois"	Sidney Hayers	Marianne Clarkson	December 2, 1985
56	11	"Conventional Warfare"	Sigmund Newfeld, Jr.	Steven L. Sears & Burt Pearl	December 9, 1985
57	12	"Duet for Two Wind Instruments"	Robert Bralver	Lawrence Hertzog	December 16, 1985
58	13	"If You Could See What I See"	Kim Manners	Carol Mendelsohn	January 6, 1986
59	14	"Hardcastle for Mayor"	Kim Manners	Alan Cassidy	January 13, 1986
60	15	"When I Look Back on All the Things"	Steven Beers	Lawrence Hertzog	February 3, 1986
61	16	"Brother, Can You Spare a Crime?"	James L. Conway	Donald Ross	February 10, 1986
62	17	"Round Up the Old Gang"	Tony Mordente	Stephen Katz	February 17, 1986
63	18	"McCormick's Bar and Grill"	James S. Giritlian	Jeff Ray	February 24, 1986
64	19	"Poker Night"	Michael J. Kane	Marianne Clarkson	March 3, 1986
65	20	"In the Eye of the Beholder"	Daniel Hugh Kelly	Daniel Hugh Kelly	March 17, 1986
66	21	"The Day the Music Died"	Charles Picerni	Tom Blomquist	March 31, 1986
67	22	"A Chip Off the Ol' Milt"	Les Sheldon	Carol Mendelsohn & Marianne Clarkson	May 5, 1986

== Production ==
=== Development ===
The series premise was somewhat recycled from a previous Cannell series, Tenspeed and Brown Shoe. It was created by Patrick Hasburgh and Stephen J. Cannell, serving as the executive producers and produced by Stephen J. Cannell Productions for ABC.

=== Music ===
The opening theme song during season one was "Drive", composed by Mike Post and Stephen Geyer and sung by David Morgan. For the first 12 episodes of season two, the theme song was "Back To Back", also composed by Post and Geyer, but sung by Joey Scarbury (who also sang Post and Geyer's theme for The Greatest American Hero). Public demand, however, resulted in the "Drive" theme being reinstated in episode 13 and kept through season three. Post and Pete Carpenter scored the music for the series.

=== "Coyote X" or "Cody Coyote" ===
The car that McCormick drove, the Coyote X, was built from custom molds based on the McLaren M6GT. The original Coyote X was molded, modified and assembled by Mike Fennel and Unique Movie Cars. The nose, windshield, doors, and lower body (minus the ventral intakes) are faithful representations of the McLaren; the cut-down rear deck, however, was a custom component that became a feature on many Manta Montage kits with damaged or removed rear windows. The most noticeable differences between the Coyotes and Mantas are the wheel wells, roll pan height and shape, and the fact that the Coyote has a one-piece front clip that terminates about an inch before and surrounding the windshield.

Most of the cars made for the show were molded and assembled by either Mike Fennel or Unique Movie Cars. Like many kit cars of the time, the car uses a chassis from a Volkswagen Beetle and its engine from a Porsche 914. For the second and third seasons, producers used a different Coyote which was based on a DMC DeLorean, as Brian Keith had difficulty getting in and out of the original Coyote. The new car is powered by a Chevy V8 small block.

The season-two and -three Coyote does not resemble the Manta, as the front is larger than the original, making the car resemble a front-engined car. The season-one "Hero" car that was used in the production of Hardcastle and McCormick is owned by a private owner in New York. The stunt/skid car (used in all three seasons) was reconfigured for the Knight Rider 2000 television pilot, then consequently turned into Jay Ohrberg's show car "Taz-Mobile". In April 2011, the stunt/skid car was sold and shipped to Dallas, Texas, where it was rebodied back to its former Coyote configuration, retaining as many of the original Coyote pieces as possible (in a private collection). Note: only one season-one "Hero Car" and one "skid/stunt" car were used in all three seasons and several (center seat-mounted, dune buggy-like, see title shot) "jump cars" were used. A season-two and -three (De Lorean body) car appeared briefly on the sixth episode of season five of the sitcom Married... with Children.

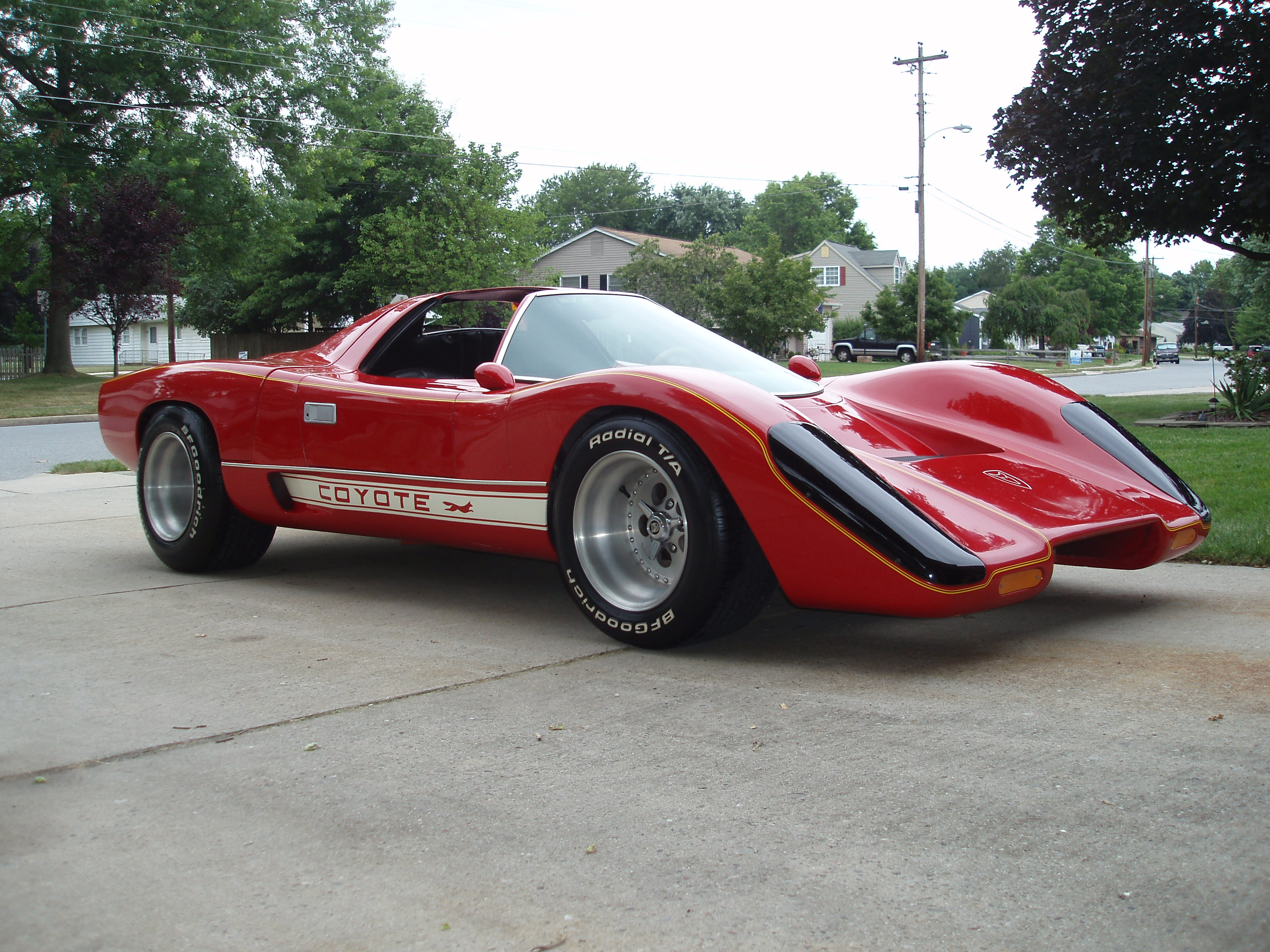
Season-one car owned by a private collector in NY

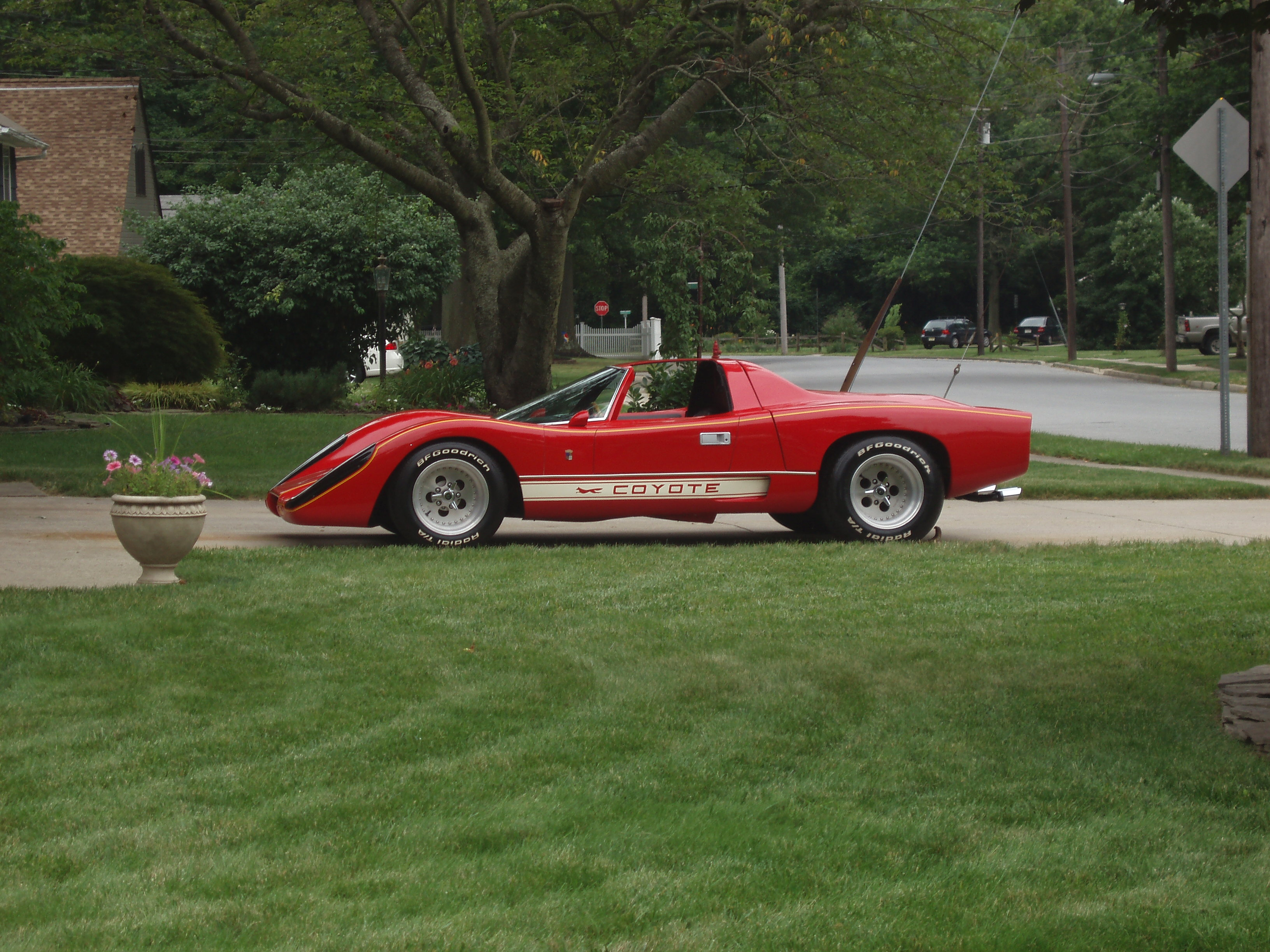
Season-one Coyote at NJ home in 2008 and now in New York (2019)

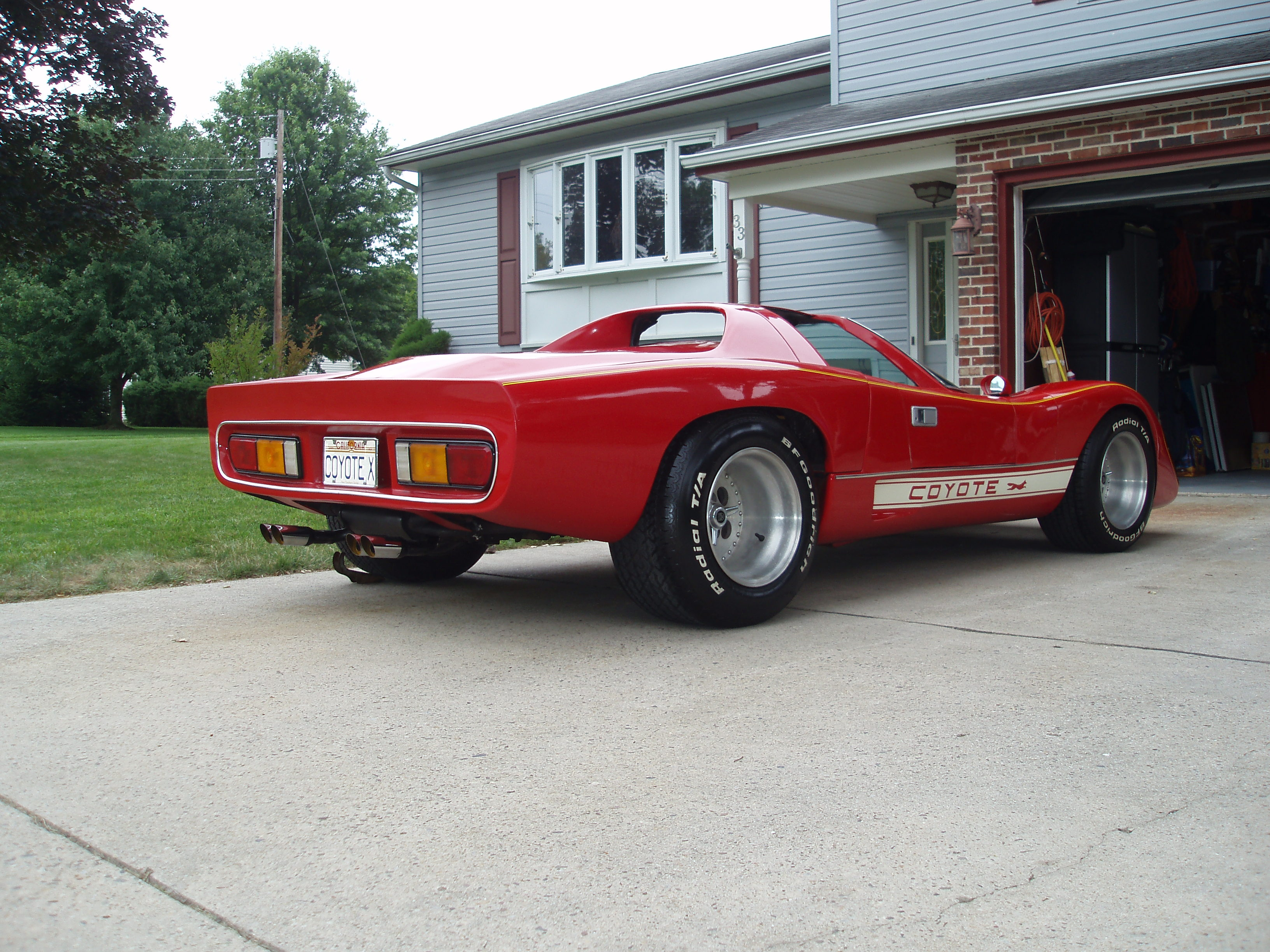
Season-one car rear quarter

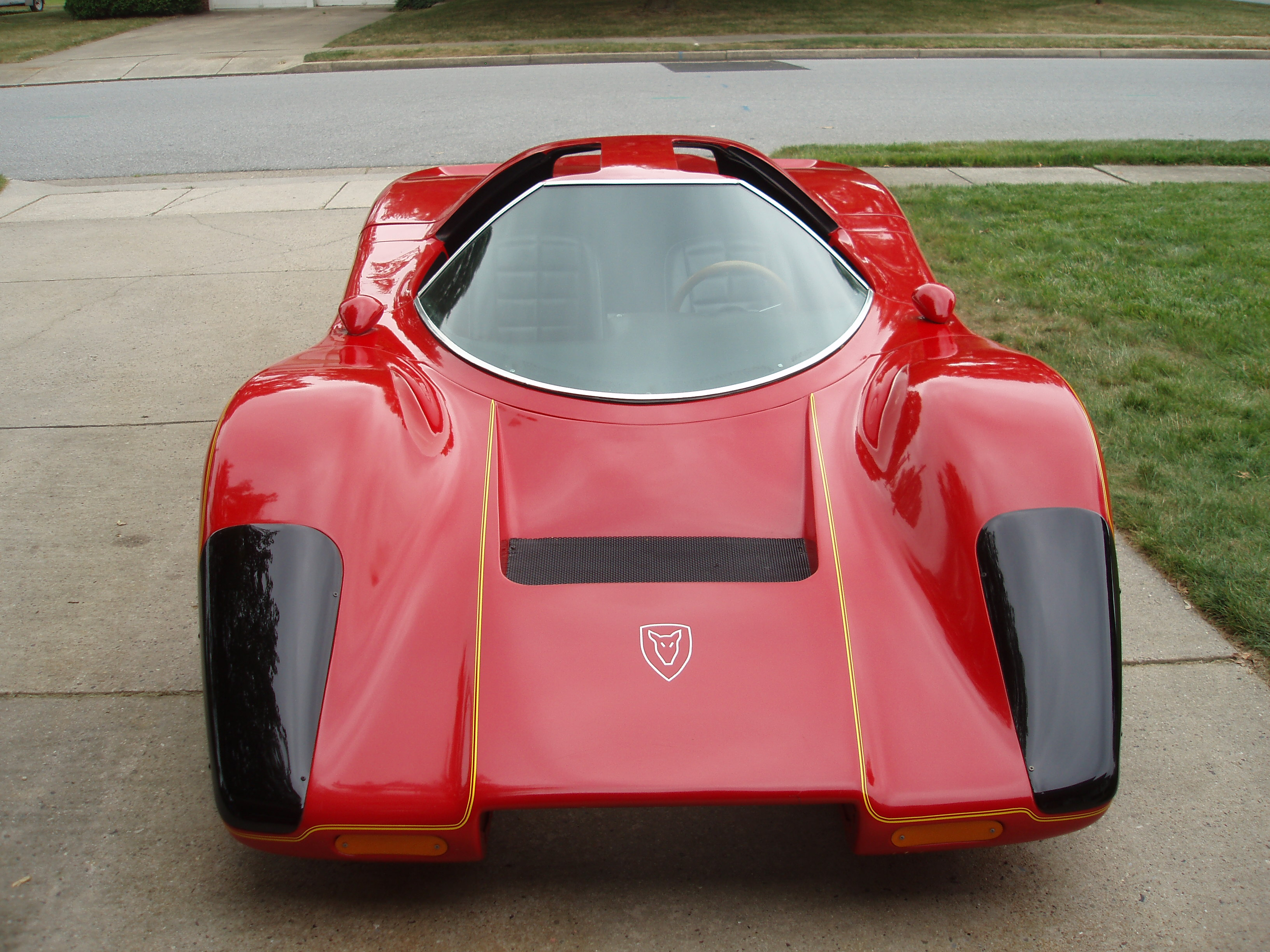
Season-one car front

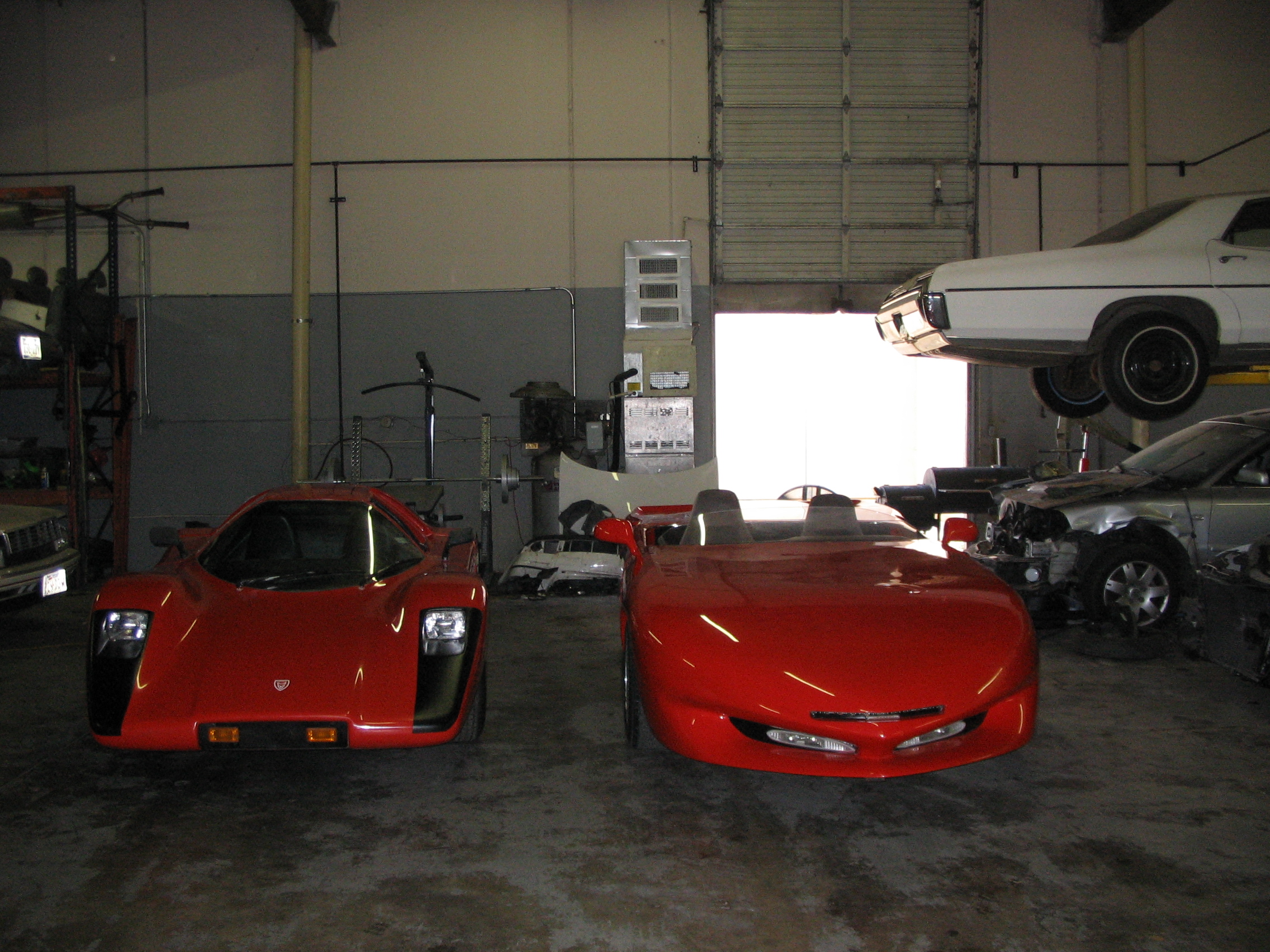
Rebodying Tazmobile back to Coyote skid/stunt car

== Reception ==
=== Critical response ===
For the first season, on the review aggregator website Rotten Tomatoes, 19% of 27 critics' reviews are positive. The website's consensus reads: "Veteran actor Brian Keith capably commits to his hard-bitten role as a vigilante judge, but this action vehicle quickly veers off the road with its offensive premise and deluge of car chases."

=== Nielsen ratings ===
- 1983–84: #15 (18.71 rating)
- 1984–85: #39 (15.82 rating)
- 1985–86: #52 (13.9 rating)

== Home media ==
Visual Entertainment has released all three seasons of Hardcastle and McCormick on DVD in Region 1 (Canada only). VEI also released Hardcastle & McCormick: The Complete Series on DVD on September 3, 2008. As of March 2016, the complete DVD set is available on Amazon.com.

DVD name	Ep #	Release date	Additional information
The Complete First Season	22	February 14, 2006	Includes 2-hour pilot, "Rolling Thunder"
The Complete Second Season	22	August 15, 2006	All Original Music
The Complete Third and Final Season	22	October 30, 2007	Photo Gallery; All Original Music
The Complete Series	66	September 3, 2008	
