= Eleanor (automobile) =

Vehicle featured in the Gone in 60 Seconds film franchise

- Gone in 60 Seconds 2000 remake vehicle
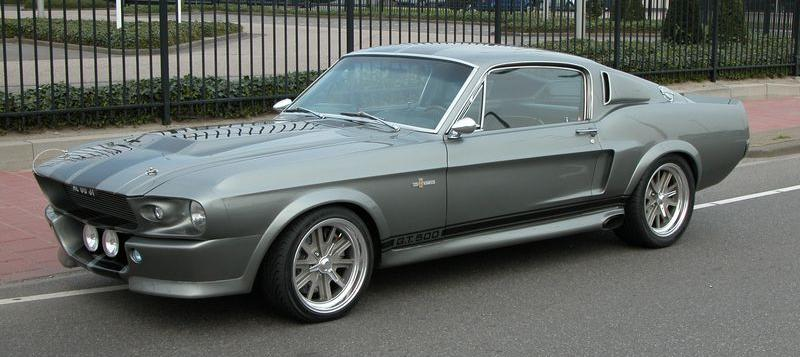
- First appearance: Gone in 60 Seconds (1974)
- Last appearance: Gone in 60 Seconds (2000)
- Created by: H. B. Halicki
- Based on: Ford Mustang

"Eleanor" is a code name used in the 1974 film Gone in 60 Seconds to refer to a 1971 Ford Mustang featured in the film. The name is used again in the 2000 remake for a customized Shelby Mustang GT500.

== Eleanor (1974 film) ==
Though four instances of Eleanor are portrayed in the original 1974 film as "Eleanor" targets, only two were used, with license plates and tires swapped as necessary. One car was modified for the stunt driving necessitated by the final chase and wrecked in the process, while the other was kept intact for all external "beauty shots". The latter car was also used for all but two interior shots.

=== Vehicle preparation ===
The two 1971 Mustang Sportsroofs used in the film were bought in 1971. Neither has been proven to be a Mach 1, as often assumed.

As it was three years before the film's director H. B. Halicki could raise sufficient funds to start filming, each car was updated with 1973 grilles.

Halicki's paint scheme blacked-out the lower bodyside, taillight panel, and standard hood, similar but not identical to contemporary Ford factory offerings on the Mach 1 (and Exterior Decor Group on Sportsroofs). All identifiable "Mustang" badging was removed but for the grille, and "Ford Motor Company" hubcaps are visible in the film.

Despite claims that both cars were painted in Ford's Medium Yellow Gold, Halicki, in a 1974 interview, stated that the cars were painted "generic school bus yellow" to save money.

=== Stunt car ===
The stunt car required 250 hours of modification. A roll cage was installed in the Mustang's stock unibody. The transmission was chained in for safety. An adjustable camera rig was mounted in the back seat to capture driver’s point of view footage.

The wrecked Eleanor was equipped with a base interior and no instrumentation package, but swapped seats with the “beauty” car’s deluxe interior package.

Other safety modifications included:

- Heavy-duty Simpson shoulder harness
- Deadbolt door locks
- Aftermarket hood pins
- 24-volt electrical system
- On-board first-aid kit
- Electrical kill switches
- Individual locking rear brakes
- Fish plating of the undercarriage—3" × 3/8" steel

The interior of the stunt car is seen only once in the film, when Halicki—as Maindrian Pace—places his hands against the windshield when cornered by the Long Beach police. The rollcage is clearly visible against the A-pillar. All other interior shots were made with the "beauty" car, generally on alternate filming dates.

The stunt car survives to this day, despite two serious incidents during filming.

The first occurred during a stunt wherein "Eleanor" cuts across multiple lanes of freeway traffic. The stunt driver leading the "traffic" overshot his mark during the take, clipping the Mustang and causing it to careen into a nearby light pole. Halicki was rendered unconscious from the impact, but filming resumed the following week—utilizing this accident as part of the final film. Halicki's first words—upon regaining consciousness—were "Did we get coverage?"

Following the incident with the light pole, Halicki compressed multiple vertebrae after performing the impressive 128-foot jump in the closing minutes of the film. The modified Mustang survived, despite the rough nose landing.

=== Beauty car ===
The second car received only the above described modifications.

Though this car was not damaged during filming, in 1974 Halicki claimed during the film's premiere that the car was crushed.

== Eleanor (2000 film) ==
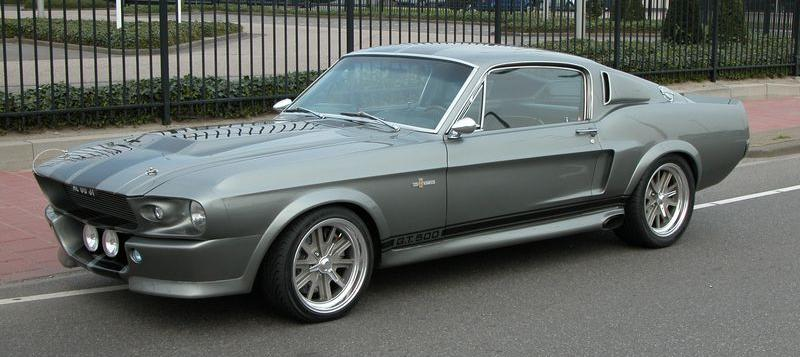
Custom 1967 Mustang Fastback Eleanor from the 2000 Gone in Sixty Seconds film.

In 1995, Denice Halicki, H.B. Halicki's widow, licensed the rights of the 1974 film to Disney for a remake of the same name. The new 2000 Gone in 60 Seconds film, produced by Jerry Bruckheimer, features Nicolas Cage as master auto thief Randall "Memphis" Raines. Both films share plot similarities about a crew of thieves who steal a large order of cars (48 in the original, 50 in the 2000 film) and deliver them to the Long Beach docks. "Eleanor" is depicted as a Dupont Pepper Grey 1967 Shelby GT500 Ford Mustang fastback, dressed with a customized body kit designed by Steve Stanford and created by Chip Foose.

=== Screen-used vehicles ===
Depending on the source, either eleven or twelve cars were built by Cinema Vehicle Services for the film (with an additional Ford 428 powered Eleanor clone built for producer Bruckheimer). Three were fully functional vehicles, and nine were built as shells. Seven were reported to have "survived the filming [and] made it back to Cinema Vehicle Services" according to research by Mustangandfords.com.

Of the surviving vehicles, three cars, all claiming to be functional builds for the film, have been offered to the public for sale:

Cinema Vehicle Services number	VIN	Sales history
?	7R02S211287	Sold at Barrett-Jackson's 2009 Scottsdale, AZ auction for $216,700.
7	7R02C173895	Sold at COYS Autosport International January 2012 auction (Birmingham, UK) for £95,000. Later offered at Mecum's Austin, Texas auction on December 12, 2014; did not meet reserve at $380,000 USD.
9	7R02C179710	Sold at Mecum's Indianapolis auction on May 18, 2013 for US$1,000,000. Touted as the "main" hero car in the film and used for promotional photographs.

Whether the two wrecked cars were rebuilt or surviving shells were built into functional cars remains unclear. The first Eleanor mustang built for the movie is at the Hollywood Star Cars museum in Gatlinburg, TN

A fourth car, VIN #7F02C229830, last offered for sale in Dubai, also claims originality to the film, but has not been authenticated.

=== Reproductions ===
Between 2007 and 2009 Classic Recreations manufactured licensed reproductions of the 2000 film's Eleanor Mustang, the 535 and 750. After two years Classic Recreations terminated the licensing agreement with Halicki Films/Eleanor Licensing.

As of 2020, Fusion Motor Company of Chatsworth, California, held a license for Halicki-approved Eleanor reproductions.

=== "Eleanor" copyright controversy ===
Over a number of years, Denice Halicki has claimed to own the copyrights to "Eleanor" as a "character", including its various body styles and likenesses. These lawsuits have sparked uncertainty among many in the car community, concerned that personal replicas or online media could be legally actionable.

==== 2004: Halicki vs. Unique Performance ====
In 2004, Halicki brought a court case against specialty car builder Unique Performance. The company had entered into a licensing agreement with Carroll Shelby to create replica Shelby GT500 vehicles with features associated with the 2000 movie car. The case was thrown out when a judge ruled that only Disney, not Halicki, held the copyright to the sequel car. An agreement between Disney and Halicki was eventually arranged.

==== 2008: Halicki vs. Shelby ====
A further "Eleanor" copyright suit was brought against Carroll Shelby, claiming Shelby and another specialty builder, Classic Recreations, were producing unlicensed "Eleanor" replicas (following Shelby's termination of business with prior builder Unique Performance). At the time, the United States Court of Appeals for the Ninth Circuit ruled in Halicki's favor.

==== 2020: Halicki vs. B is for Build ====
In May 2020, Halicki filed a case against YouTube video creator Chris Steinbacher, known on the platform as "B is for Build." Steinbacher had been creating a 1967 Shelby replica (built over a 2015 Mustang) on his channel, dubbed "Eleanor."

The case was found in Halicki's favor at the time, resulting in Steinbacher being forced to relinquish the car as part of the suit's resolution.

==== 2022: Carroll Shelby Licensing vs. Halicki ====
Following the 2008 ruling, Halicki brought further lawsuits against Classic Recreations, alleging that their licensed Shelby GT500 reproductions were violating the claimed "Eleanor" copyright. These actions also included legal letters addressed to "owners and an auction house" from Halicki, in an effort to prevent the resale of these cars.

These actions eventually resulted in Carroll Shelby Licensing filing a case (collectively with Classic Recreations) against Halicki in 2022. As a result of this suit, the United States District Court for the Central District of California invalidated Halicki's copyright claims, ruling that the assertion that Eleanor—as a distinctive character—was "an invention of overzealous advocacy", and that the car was "not entitled to standalone copyright protection as a matter of law".

==== 2023: Halicki Appeal to Ninth Circuit ====
In February 2023, Halicki appealed the previous ruling with the Ninth Circuit. Bench trial testimony was heard in March, with U.S. District Judge Mark Scarsi ultimately dismissing Halicki's copyright claims in June of the same year, making no ruling on the case.

==== 2025: Ninth Circuit Ruling ====
In June 2025, the Ninth Circuit ruled that Eleanor is not eligible for copyright protection, as the car is a prop and not a character. The ruling mentioned that the car failed the three prongs of the Towle test: lacking anthropomorphic qualities, consistent traits, and specifically distinctive qualities.
