= Gone in 60 Seconds (2000 film) =

2000 American action film directed by Dominic Sena

- Theatrical release poster
- Directed by: Dominic Sena
- Written by: Scott Rosenberg
- Based on: Gone in 60 Seconds by H. B. Halicki
- Produced by: Jerry Bruckheimer; Mike Stenson
- Starring: Nicolas Cage; Angelina Jolie; Giovanni Ribisi; Delroy Lindo; Will Patton; Christopher Eccleston; Chi McBride; Robert Duvall
- Cinematography: Paul Cameron
- Edited by: Roger Barton; Chris Lebenzon; Tom Muldoon
- Music by: Trevor Rabin
- Production companies: Touchstone Pictures; Jerry Bruckheimer Films
- Distributed by: Buena Vista Pictures Distribution
- Release date: June 9, 2000
- Running time: 118 minutes
- Country: United States
- Language: English
- Budget: $90–103.3 million
- Box office: $237 million

Gone in 60 Seconds (also known as Gone in Sixty Seconds) is a 2000 American action heist film directed by Dominic Sena, and produced by Jerry Bruckheimer. It is a loose remake of the 1974 film of the same name by H. B. Halicki. The film stars Nicolas Cage, Angelina Jolie, Giovanni Ribisi, Christopher Eccleston, Robert Duvall, Vinnie Jones, Delroy Lindo, Chi McBride, and Will Patton.

The plot centers on reformed car thief Memphis (Cage) who is forced out of retirement and tasked to steal 50 luxury vehicles in one night in order to save the life of his brother (Ribisi). He recruits members of his old crew including his mentor (Duvall) and ex-girlfriend (Jolie). The film was shot from May to October 1999, throughout Los Angeles and Long Beach, California.

Gone in 60 Seconds was released on June 9, 2000, by Buena Vista Pictures through its Touchstone Pictures label. It received generally negative reviews from critics, with criticism for its writing, direction, as well as acting and action sequences. Despite the critical response, the film grossed $237 million against an estimated production budget of $90 million.

== Plot ==
Car thief Kip Raines works with his gang to steal 50 high-end cars for Raymond Calitri, a British gangster in Long Beach, California. After stealing a Porsche 996 from a showroom, Kip unwittingly leads the police to his crew's warehouse, forcing the thieves to flee. Detectives Castlebeck and Drycoff impound the stolen cars and open an investigation. Atley Jackson, Calitri's associate, reaches out to Kip's brother Randall "Memphis" Raines, a notorious but reformed car thief. Memphis meets with Calitri, who has kidnapped Kip and plans to kill him in a car crusher. In exchange for Kip's freedom, Memphis must steal the 50 cars within 72 hours; if he fails to deliver the cars on time, or if he and Kip try to flee, Kip, Memphis, and their mother will be killed.

Memphis visits his mentor Otto Halliwell, and they assemble a crew of old associates: Donny Astricky, now a driving instructor; Sphinx, a mute mortician; and Sara "Sway" Wayland, a mechanic and bartender. Kip and his crew volunteer to help, and the group tracks down the cars, giving each a code name; Memphis insists on saving a 1967 Ford Shelby GT500, dubbed "Eleanor"—which he has attempted to steal before—for last. While scouting the cars, he and Kip narrowly avoid being killed by a rival gang led by Johnny B. Hoping to deliver the cars before they can be traced, the crew plans to steal every car in one night.

Castlebeck and Drycoff learn that Kip bribed a Mercedes dealership employee to order laser-cut transponder keys, enabling the detectives to stakeout the Mercedes cars on the crew's list. A member of Kip's crew impulsively steals a Cadillac Eldorado not on the list, and the crew discovers a stash of heroin in the trunk. Castlebeck arrives, forcing the crew to distract him while they dispose of the drugs. He leaves, having ascertained that the heist is happening that night.

The crew sets their heist in motion, stealing the various cars and delivering them to Atley on the docks. As they prepare to use the transponder keys to steal the Mercedes cars, Memphis spots Castlebeck and Drycoff watching from a surveillance van. Abandoning the cars under surveillance, the crew breaks into the police impound lot, distracting the guard and stealing the Mercedes cars originally stolen by Kip's crew; the plan is hampered temporarily when Otto's dog eats and eventually passes, the keys. Memphis and Sway rekindle their past romance while stealing a Lamborghini Diablo. Castlebeck and Drycoff return to the warehouse seized from Kip's crew. Having found pieces of a broken blacklight lamp, the detectives discover the crew's original list of 50 cars written in UV-sensitive paint. With too many cars to track, Castlebeck focuses on the Shelby GT500, knowing Memphis will steal it last, and determines its location. When the crew steals a Cadillac Escalade, security is alerted, and Toby, the youngest member, is shot during the pursuit. Memphis steals Eleanor just as the detectives arrive and leads police on a chase through the city and into a shipyard. Reaching the Vincent Thomas Bridge, blocked by an accident, Memphis jumps Eleanor off the ramp of a tow truck and lands on the other side, evading Castlebeck, Drycoff, LAPD, and CHP that had surrounded him.

Memphis arrives at Calitri's junkyard 12 minutes late, and Calitri refuses to accept the slightly damaged Shelby, ordering his men to crush the car and kill Memphis. Kip and Atley use the junkyard crane to knock out the henchmen, and Memphis charges at Calitri in his warehouse as the detectives arrive. As Castlebeck enters, Calitri prepares to shoot him, but Memphis kicks Calitri over a railing to his death. A grateful Castlebeck lets Memphis go free, and Memphis tells him where to find the container ship full of stolen cars.

The crew celebrates with a barbecue, and Kip reveals that he has bought Memphis a dilapidated 1967 Shelby GT500 which Memphis also calls "Eleanor", which Otto promises to restore. Memphis invites Sway on a ride, but the car breaks down just as they drive away.

== Cast ==
- Nicolas Cage as Randall "Memphis" Raines, a former car thief who comes out of retirement to steal 50 cars in exchange for his brother's life
- Angelina Jolie as Sara "Sway" Wayland, a mechanic and bartender who was once Memphis' girlfriend and ends up rekindling their romance
- Robert Duvall as Otto Halliwell, Memphis' former mentor who helps him attempt to pull off his biggest task yet
- Giovanni Ribisi as Kip Raines, a car thief and Memphis' brother
- Delroy Lindo as Detective Roland Castlebeck, a police detective investigating stolen cars, who has a grudge against Memphis
- Christopher Eccleston as Raymond Vincent Calitri, a British gangster and Kip's former boss who gives Memphis the task of delivering 50 stolen cars for him in exchange for Kip's life
- Will Patton as Atley Jackson, an original member of Memphis' former crew and currently Raymond Calitri's associate
- Vinnie Jones as "Sphinx", a mute mortician and former member of Memphis' team, who comes out of retirement to help him
- Chi McBride as Donny Astricky, a driver instructor and a former member of Memphis' team, who comes out of retirement to help him
- Scott Caan as "Tumbler", a member of Kip's team
- T.J. Cross as "Mirror Man", a member of Kip's team
- James Duval as Freb, a member of Kip's team
- William Lee Scott as Toby, the youngest member of Kip's team
- Timothy Olyphant as Detective Drycoff, Detective Castlebeck's partner who helps him attempt to catch Memphis
- Grace Zabriskie as Helen Raines, the mother of Memphis and Kip
- Frances Fisher as Junie Halliwell, Otto's wife
- Stephen Shellen as Roger
- Harry Van Gorkum as Forge
- Trevor Goddard as Don
- Master P as Johnny "Johnny B", leader of a gang and a past rival of Memphis who still holds a grudge against him (uncredited)
- Carmen Argenziano as Detective Mayhew, a homicide cop
- Bodhi Elfman as "Fuzzy" Frizzel
- Arye Gross as James Lakewood
- Dan Hildebrand as Saul
- Michael Peña as Ignacio
- John Carroll Lynch as Impound Manager

=== Cars featured ===
The 50 cars, stolen in the film, are listed below. They are listed in the same order as seen in the film; by year and model, along with their respective codenames.

#	Year	Automobile	Code	#	Year	Automobile	Code
1	1999	Aston Martin DB7	Mary	26	1999	Infiniti Q45	Rachel
2	1962	Aston Martin DB1	Barbara	27	1994	Jaguar XJ220	Bernadine
3	1999	Bentley Arnage	Lindsey	28	1999	Jaguar XK8 Coupe	Deborah
4	1999	Bentley Azure	Laura	29	1990	Lamborghini Diablo SE30	Gina
5	1964	Bentley Continental	Alma	30	1999	Lexus LS 400	Hillary
6	1959	Cadillac Eldorado	Madeline	31	1999	Lincoln Navigator	Kimberley
7	1958	Cadillac Eldorado Brougham	Patricia	32	1957	Mercedes-Benz 300SL/Gullwing	Dorothy
8	1999	Cadillac Escalade	Carol	33	1999	Mercedes-Benz CL500	Donna
9	2000	Cadillac Eldorado STS	Daniela	34	1999	Mercedes-Benz S600	Samantha
10	1957	Chevrolet Bel Air Convertible	Stefanie	35	1998	Mercedes Benz SL 600	Ellen
11	1969	Chevrolet Camaro Z28	Erin	36	1950	Mercury Custom	Gabriela
12	1953	Chevrolet Corvette	Pamela	37	1971	Plymouth Hemi 'Cuda	Shannon
13	1967	Chevrolet Corvette Stingray L71	Stacey	38	1969	Plymouth Road Runner	Jessica
14	2000	Ford F-Series F-350 4×4 Pickup (Modified)	Ann	39	1965	Pontiac GTO	Sharon
15	1971	DeTomaso Pantera	Kate	40	1999	Porsche 996	Tina
16	1970	Plymouth Superbird	Vanessa	41	2000	Porsche Boxster	Marsha
17	1998	Dodge Viper Coupé GTS	Denise	42	1961	Porsche 356B Speedster	Natalie
18	1995	Ferrari F355 B	Diane	43	1988	Porsche 959	Virginia
19	1997	Ferrari F355 F1	Iris	44	1997	Porsche 911 Twin Turbo	Tanya
20	1967	Ferrari 275 GTB/4	Nadine	45	2000	Rolls-Royce Park Ward Stretch Limousine	Grace
21	1999	Ferrari 550 Maranello	Angelina	46	1966	Shelby AC Cobra	Ashley
22	1987	Ferrari Testarossa	Rose	47	1967	Shelby Mustang GT500	Eleanor
23	1956	Ford Thunderbird	Susan	48	2000	Toyota Land Cruiser	Katie
24	2000	GMC Yukon	Megan	49	1998	Toyota Supra Turbo	Lynn
25	1999	Hummer H1 (2 Door)	Tracy	50	2000	Volvo V70R	Lisa

== Production ==
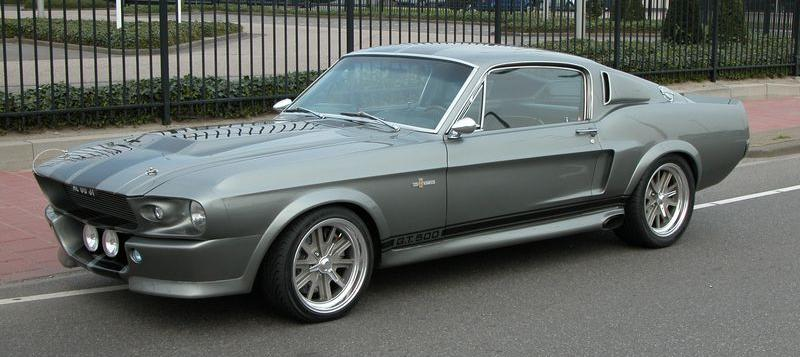
An original "Eleanor" car in 2010. They were created by hot rod designer Chip Foose, who based his design on the sketches drawn by illustrator Steve Stanford. Of the 12 made, five were destroyed during the film's production.

In 1995, Denice Shakarian Halicki entered into a license contract to produce the remake with Disney and Jerry Bruckheimer. The film was originally slated to be released under Disney's Hollywood Pictures label, until it was transferred to Touchstone Pictures during production. Nicolas Cage dropped out of The Perfect Storm in favor of the film.

The film's trailer was narrated by Melissa Disney. The film is widely credited as one of the first major movies to employ a female trailer voice.

=== Eleanor hero car ===
The "Eleanor" name was given to the film's featured car; a Dupont Pepper Grey 1967 Ford Mustang fastback, depicted as a Shelby GT500, with a customized body kit designed by Steve Stanford and created by Chip Foose.

Depending on the source, either eleven or twelve cars were built by Cinema Vehicle Services for the film (not including CVS's creation of one additional Eleanor clone—with a Ford 428—for producer Bruckheimer). Nine were shells, and three were built as fully functional vehicles. Seven were reported to have "survived the filming [and] made it back to Cinema Vehicle Services" according to research by Mustangandfords.com.

=== Filming ===
Filming began on May 24, 1999, with Halicki as executive producer. According to shooting location guide Hollywood Escapes, "the garage where Will Patton tracks down retired car thief Nicolas Cage for one last job" was shot on North Edwards Street in Independence, California.

== Music ==
=== Soundtrack ===
A soundtrack containing a blend of rock, electronic, and hip-hop music was released on June 6, 2000, by the Island Def Jam Music Group. It peaked at no. 69 on the Billboard 200.

An album containing only Trevor Rabin's instrumental music for the film was also released in 2000 (subtitled "Original Motion Picture Score").

== Release ==
=== Theatrical ===
Gone in 60 Seconds was released by Buena Vista Pictures under its Touchstone Pictures label on June 9, 2000.

=== Home media ===
The film was released on DVD and VHS on December 5, 2000. An Unrated Director's Cut version premiered on DVD on June 7, 2005.

== Reception ==
=== Box office ===
Gone in 60 Seconds grossed over $25,336,048 on its opening weekend in 3,006 US theaters, ranking #1 at the box office and dethroning previous holdover Mission: Impossible 2. On its second week, the film dropped 41.2% to #2 behind Shaft with $14,896,031. By the end of its theatrical run, Gone in 60 Seconds had grossed $101,648,571 domestically and $135,553,728 internationally, comprising a total gross revenue for the film of $237,202,299 worldwide.

Due to its high production and marketing costs, it is estimated the film lost the studio about $90 million, although due to Hollywood accounting, Disney wrote it down as a $212 million loss.

=== Critical response ===
On Rotten Tomatoes, 25% out of 138 reviews were positive, with an average rating of 4.40/10. The website's critical consensus reads: "Even though Oscar-bearers Nicolas Cage, Angelina Jolie, and Robert Duvall came aboard for this project, the quality of Gone in 60 Seconds is disappointingly low. The plot line is nonsensical, and even the promised car-chase scenes are boring". On Metacritic, the film has a weighted average score of 35 out of 100, based on 34 critics, indicating "generally unfavorable" reviews. Audiences polled by CinemaScore gave the film an average grade of B+ on an A+ to F scale.

Desson Thomson of The Washington Post gave the film a 1.5 out of 4 rating, explaining that "Cage has found a movie to challenge Snake Eyes and Eight Millimeter as the dumbest of his career." In 2025, The Hollywood Reporter listed Gone in 60 Seconds as having the best stunts of 2000.

=== Awards ===
At the 2000 Stinkers Bad Movie Awards, the film won the awards for Worst Screenplay for a Film That Grossed over $100 Million Using Hollywood Math, and Most Intrusive Musical Score. Angelina Jolie received a nomination for Worst On-Screen Hairstyle but lost to John Travolta and Forest Whitaker for Battlefield Earth.
