= Deadline Auto Theft =

- Theatrical release poster
- Directed by: H. B. Halicki
- Written by: H. B. Halicki
- Produced by: H. B. Halicki
- Starring: H. B. Halicki; Hoyt Axton; Dan Grimaldi; Judi Gibbs; Jerry Daugirda; Marion Busia
- Cinematography: Jack Vacek; Tony Syslo
- Edited by: Warner E. Leighton; P. J. Webb
- Production company: H.B. Halicki Mercantile Co.
- Distributed by: Halicki International
- Release date: October 28, 1983
- Running time: 98 minutes
- Country: United States
- Language: English
- Budget: $1 million

Deadline Auto Theft is a 1983 American independent film written and directed by H. B. "Toby" Halicki made up of scenes from Gone in 60 Seconds and The Junkman as well as new material featuring Hoyt Axton. It is a sequel to The Junkman (1982) and the third installment in the Gone in 60 Seconds film series.

== Plot ==
After the attempted theft of his daughter's fiance's car, LAPD Captain Gibbs declares war on master car thief Maindrian Pace. Meanwhile, Pace is hired to steal 40 cars, and must do so without being caught.

== Cast ==
- H. B. "Toby" Halicki as Maindrian Pace / Vicinski / Mr. Villis
- Hoyt Axton as Captain Gibbs
- Marion Busia as Pumpkin Chase
- Jerry Daugirda as Eugene Chase
- George Cole Atlee Jackson
- Lang Jeffries as Lieutenant Arthur
- Dan Grimaldi as Carl Augusta
- Judi Gibbs as Herself
- Pat Hartigan as Lieutenant Reed

== Production ==
=== Development ===
Deadline Auto Theft was a piecemeal effort by Halicki to incorporate the opening chase of The Junkman into the film Gone in 60 Seconds. The film is essentially a trimmed alternate cut of his 1974 cult classic with a new subplot featuring Axton incorporated into it. The chase from The Junkman was depicted in that film as the making of a car chase picture – a case of meta-fiction; in Deadline Auto Theft, the footage is incorporated into the plot, essentially making this film the movie that was being produced in The Junkman.
