= Don't Go in the House =

1980 American horror film directed by Joseph Ellison

- Theatrical release poster
- Directed by: Joseph Ellison
- Screenplay by: Ellen Hammill; Joe Masefield; Joseph Ellison
- Story by: Joe Masefield
- Produced by: Ellen Hammill
- Starring: Dan Grimaldi; Robert Osth; Ruth Dardick
- Cinematography: Oliver Wood
- Edited by: Jane Kurson
- Music by: Richard Einhorn
- Production company: Turbine Films Inc.
- Distributed by: Film Ventures International
- Release dates: November 1979 (Paris Festival of Fantastic Films); March 28, 1980 (United States)
- Running time: 82 minutes
- Country: United States
- Language: English
- Budget: $250,000
- Box office: $2.95 million

Don't Go in the House (Note: The title is sometimes stylized as Don't Go in the House!; it was also alternately known as The Burning, which appears on some prints of the film.) is a 1979 American slasher film written and directed by Joseph Ellison, written by Ellen Hammill and Joe Masefield, and starring Dan Grimaldi. Its plot follows a disturbed man who, after suffering an abusive childhood in which his mother punished him with burning, becomes a pyromaniac and serial killer who kidnaps and burns alive any women who resemble her.

Filmed in the historic Strauss Mansion in Atlantic Highlands, New Jersey from February–March 1979, Don't Go in the House was released one year later in the spring of 1980, and was met with sharp criticism from film critics due to its graphic depictions of violence, particularly a sequence in which the protagonist burns a nude woman alive with a flamethrower.

== Plot ==
Donny Kohler is a withdrawn man in his thirties who is obsessed with fire—his fixation stems back to his childhood, during which his sadistic, abusive mother would burn him on their gas stove to "burn the evil out of him." After returning from his factory job one evening to the dilapidating Victorian home he shares with his now-elderly mother, Donny finds that she has died in her upstairs bedroom. This spurs mixed emotions—initially of excitement, as he is finally freed from her—but alternately, fear, as he begins to hear a disembodied voice in the house that seems hers.

The following day, Donny calls in sick to work and spends the day lining an upstairs room with aluminum, effectively fireproofing it. That night, he visits a flower shop right before closing and is sold flowers for his mother by a florist named Kathy Jordan. Outside the shop, Donny sees Kathy miss her bus before she is harangued by a group of men. When Donny offers her a ride, she accepts. Donny talks Kathy into meeting his mother, but she grows nervous once inside and attempts to call for a taxi before Donny incapacitates her.

Kathy regains consciousness and finds herself naked and chained to the ceiling of the metal-walled room. Donny enters the room in a fire suit, douses Kathy in gasoline, and burns her alive using a flamethrower. The following day, Donny fails to show up to work and instead kidnaps a stranded female motorist, again murdering her by immolation. He then proceeds to singe his mother's corpse before dressing it in her clothing. Donny repeats the same murder scenario that night with Linda, a woman he assails at a grocery store, and arranges her alongside his mother and the other two female victims.

Donny's friend Bobby phones him that night and warns him that their boss will fire Donny if he fails to show up to work again. Meanwhile, Donny is haunted by apparitions of his burnt mother, who appears to stalk him inside the house. Donny spends hours regaling the four corpses with stories from his life, which he has arranged and posed in chairs in a bedroom. Riddled with guilt over what he has done, Donny visits Father Gerritty, his local priest, to discuss the nature of evil. Donny confesses to Father Gerritty that his mother repeatedly burned him to rid him of his innate "evil."

Later, Donny accepts his friend Bobby's invitation to go on a double date at a disco. When Donny's date tries to pull him onto the dance floor, she inadvertently brushes his arm over the table's lighted candle, triggering memories of his childhood abuse. Enraged, Donny smashes the candleholder onto her head, setting her hair on fire. Donny flees the disco and, en route home, encounters two drunk women whom he convinces to come home with him. Bobby tries to find Donny and stops by Father Gerritty's on his way to Donny's house. When no one answers the front door, they break it down and rescue the two women. Donny sets Father Gerritty ablaze with his flamethrower, but Bobby manages to extinguish the flames and rescue him. Donny takes refuge inside his mother's bedroom. The voices express their disappointment in him, and the burned corpses come to life and attack him. He frantically fights them but dies; they drag him to the floor as the house burns down around him.

Sometime later, a young boy named Michael watches the news report about Donny's death. His mother scolds and beats him for not turning off the TV as she asks him to go upstairs and clean his room. When she leaves the room, Michael hears the same voices as Donny, and they tell him they have come to 'help' him.

== Cast ==
- Dan Grimaldi as Donald 'Donny' Kohler
  - Colin Mclnness as Young Donald Kohler
- Charlie Bonet as Ben
- Bill Ricci as Vito
- Robert Osth as Bobby Tuttle
- Johanna Brushay as Kathy Jordan
- Ruth Dardick as Mrs. Kohler
- Ralph D. Bowman as Father Gerritty
- Joey Peschl as Bobby Tuttle's son
- Christian Isidore as Michael
- Eileen Dunn as Michael's mother

== Production ==
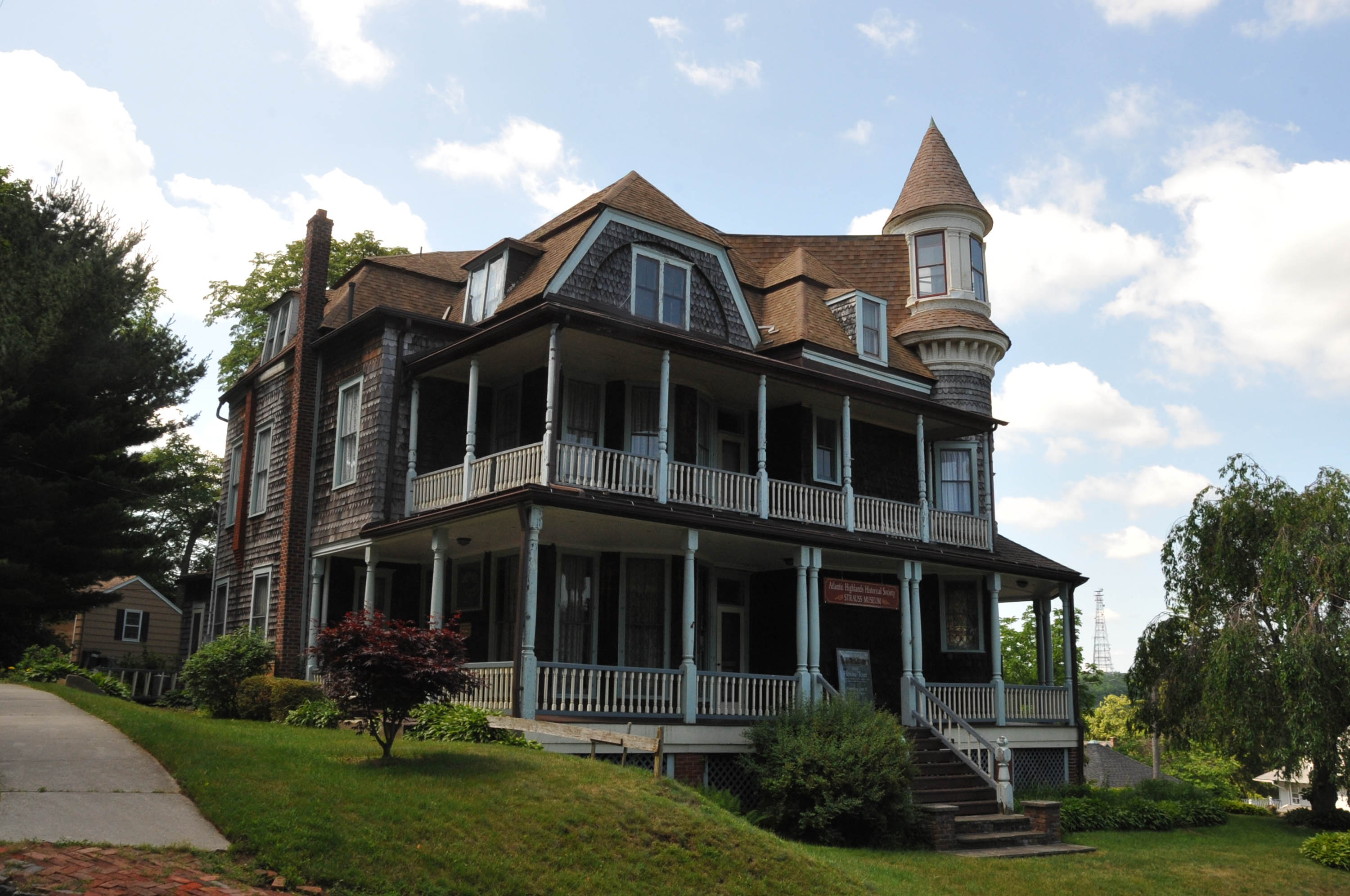
The film was shot in the Strauss Mansion in New Jersey

Don't Go in the House was filmed on location at the Strauss Mansion in Atlantic Highlands, New Jersey from February–March 1979. At the time, the Strauss Mansion was in a state of disrepair and had been used as low-income housing.

=== Music ===
The film score was composed by Richard Einhorn. The score features electronics mixed with orchestral and dissonant sounds. The soundtrack was released by Waxwork Records in 2019 as a double LP, making it the first-ever soundtrack release for the film.

== Release ==
Don't Go in the House was originally given regional theatrical release, opening in Honolulu, Hawaii on April 9, 1980.

=== Censorship ===
Despite some respectable critical notices, Don't Go in the House attracted controversy almost immediately because of its graphic depiction of the death of Kathy Jordan, Donny Kohler's first victim, and the central theme of childhood abuse. The film was cut by almost three minutes when it was released in Britain in the winter of 1980, but an uncut version was released on video by the Arcade label in 1982 – knowingly or not, they advertised the release as "a true 'nasty' from Arcade", and it quickly wound up on the DPP's list of banned titles, or video nasties. The pre-cut British cinema version was released on video by the Apex label in April 1987, though the film was finally passed uncut in 2011.

=== Critical response ===
On the review aggregator website Rotten Tomatoes, Don’t Go in the House holds a 50% approval rating based on 5 critic reviews, with an average rating of 3.75/10.

John Stark of the San Francisco Examiner panned the film for its depiction of violence, writing: "I would love to be flip and sarcastic about a new horror picture called Don't Go in the House... But I can't. This movie is so sick and grotesque that it makes you spit nails." Writing for the San Pedro News-Pilot, Joseph Bensoua was critical of the film, writing that it "should be avoided at all costs unless, of course, you want to be bored to death. The entire movie lacks suspense or terror and follows a cut-and-dried plot."

DVD Talk gave the film a three and a half out of five, writing that, Don't Go in the House "is one of those rare films that works really well despite the fact that rips off better-known movies" and "it's a bitter, ugly, and nasty little horror movie that doesn't pull any punches and is just as seedy today as it was when it was made. It's effective in that it gets under your skin despite its low budget origins and obvious flaws". Hysteria Lives! gave the film a similar rating, writing, "Grim is the only word for Joseph Ellison's psychological terror movie" and "It's easy to forget just how nihilistic much of American genre cinema was as the 70s turned into the 80s (especially with the avalanche of cheese that was just round the corner), but Don't Go in the House is a chilly reminder of times when practically anything went". In a retrospective, Dave J. Wilson from Dread Central felt the film was underappreciated, and called it "a dark, chilling, grim and gruesome depiction of the tragic repercussions of child abuse".

=== Home media ===
Don't Go into the House was first released on VHS home video in 1982 by Media Home Entertainment. It was re-released on VHS by Video Treasures on May 15, 1988. The film was released for the first time on DVD by DVD Ltd on December 2, 1998. It was later released on DVD by Shriek Show on November 29, 2005. Shriek Show would later re-release the film on February 5, 2008, as a part of its three-disk "Grindhouse Psychos!" film pack. American boutique home video label Scorpion Releasing then released the film on Blu-ray, uncut for the very first time in 2015. In November 2021, Severin Films announced they would be releasing a new special edition Blu-ray on January 25, 2022. Arrow Video released a special edition Blu-Ray in the UK in February 2022 as 2 disc edition and a special "Video Nasty" 3 disc limited edition, giving viewers the chance to watch the original remastered uncut version, the extended version as well as watching it in a retro 'VHS' form.
