= Kelmark Engineering =

Defunct American automotive specialty shop

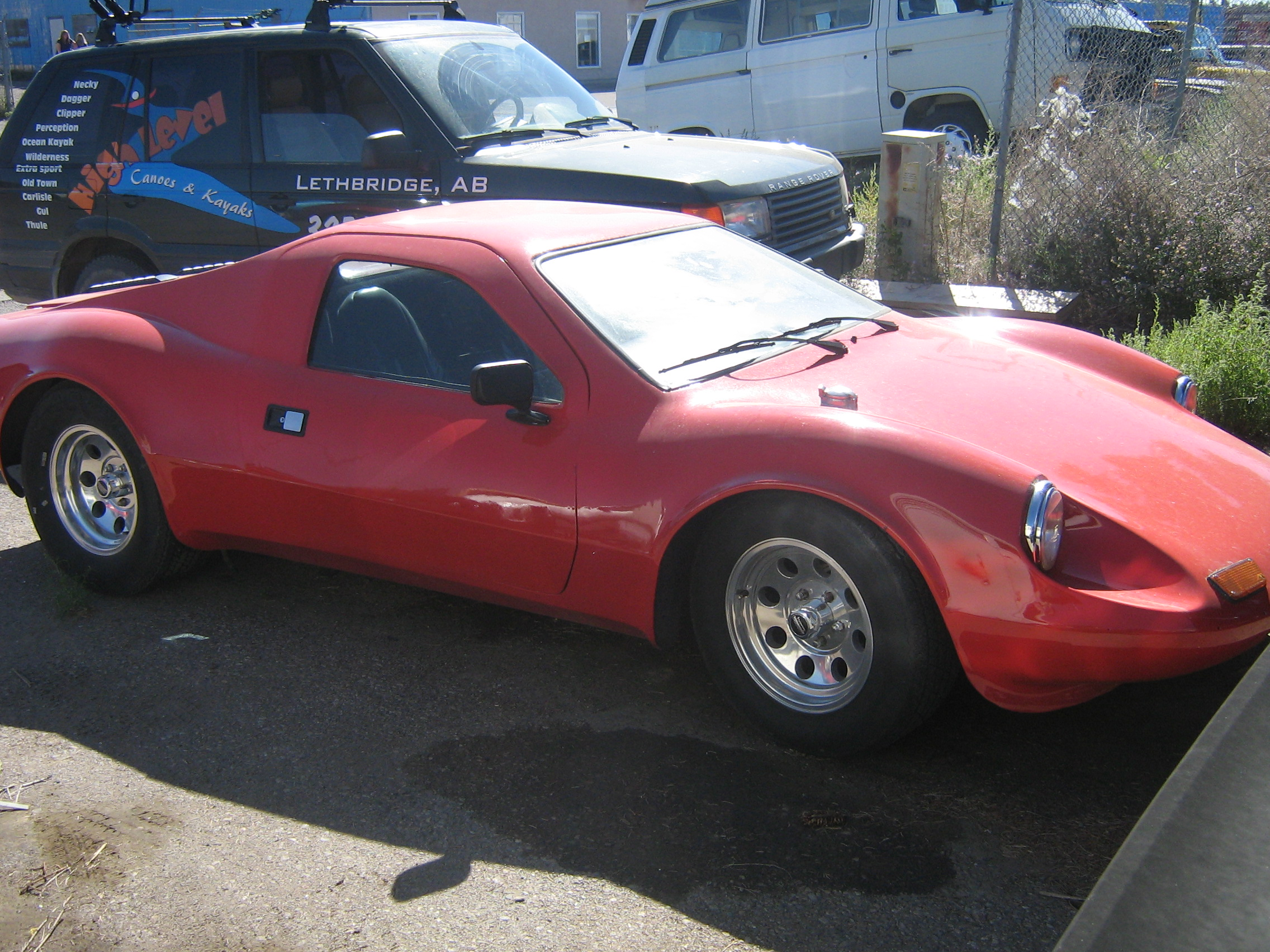
Kelmark GT

Kelmark Engineering is an American automotive specialty shop established in 1969 and based in Okemos, Michigan. It focused on high-performance custom V8 drivetrain swaps, the modification and production of rear and mid-engined cars, and custom-built turn-key automobiles (the Kelmark GT). Until 1986, Kelmark Engineering manufactured kits and complete, finished, turn-key vehicles which were either Volkswagen-based or built on tubular race car-type frames. The outfit gained its name from Jim Kellison and Randy Markham, the two co-creators who started the operation. Up until at least 1989, the Kelmark GT was still available as a kit albeit the manufacturer was Kelmark Motors in Holt, Michigan. The cars are all "rare" models, but the Volkswagen-powered Kelmark GT was the most popular.

== Models ==
=== Kelmark Sleeper ===
Early on Kelmark gained a reputation as an innovator starting with V8 conversions for Volkswagen Beetles and Chevrolet Corvairs. They produced a unique car for the time period: a V8-powered Volkswagen Beetle. It was marketed as the Sleeper, and was meant to look like a stock Beetle. It was this style chassis that the original Kelmark GT Coupe was designed around.

=== Kelmark V8-Vair ===
A mid-engine V8 conversion for the Chevrolet Corvair. This mid-engine conversion turned the rear-engined Chevrolet Corvair transaxle around 180 degrees and used a special bell housing and input shaft to bolt the V8 where the stock air-cooled engine would normally be connected. This makes the rotation of the differential backwards.

The main advantage of the Kelmark Conversion is increased power and good engine placement in terms of weight distribution. The setup has a 40/60 front to rear weight distribution ratio. The main disadvantage of the Kelmark Conversion is that it requires rotating the transaxle 180° in the flat plane, and connecting it to the engine with a bell housing adapter. A stronger shaft is needed to withstand the torque of the V8 engine. Also, since the ring gear turns backwards it requires a free flow oil system or a reverse cut ring and pinion gear set. They also required a heavy duty differential or differential modifications. The Corvair differential was not designed to handle more than 250 hp (190 kW). When you put the power and torque of even a mild V8 to the stock differential, it tries to split the case from the pinion gear being forced against the ring gear.

In the early days, Crown created a modified Volkswagen differential carrier by adding two extra pinion gears to the existing two gears which in effect lessened the load and made the differentials last longer. It was called a Beef-a-diff. When Corvair transaxles started to be used in high performance applications the differential again being a weak spot was modified by adding two more pinion gears. This created a cross legged look whence the "spider" nickname was derived.

Back then a CIDCO transaxle could be purchased, this stands for Corvair Improvement Distributing Company as owned by Bob Anderson. At one time he developed Corvair transaxles with many improvements, not only for Corvairs but the kit car industry as well. Bob improved the longevity of the differentials through many modifications, re-manufacture and re-engineering, along with careful assembly. This included having reverse cut ring and pinion gears made for the Kelmark transaxle setup which ran in reverse. His setup was in great demand by the mid-engine Corvair enthusiasts. One of the trademarks of the CIDCO diff is the shoulder bolted steel plate cover on top of the differential in place of the tin cover.

=== Kelmark 1 GT ===
Initially constructed as a V8 engine special. The car had exterior styling that was distinctive for its debut in the beginning of 1974. The style of the Kelmark 1 GT Coupe was copied directly from a Dino 206 / 246.

=== Kelmark II GT ===
In late 1974 Kelmark Engineering decided to adapt it to fit the Type 1 Volkswagen Beetle chassis. This revised car was introduced as the Kelmark II. The Kelmark 1 GT Coupe was partially restyled into the Kelmark II utilizing styling cues from the experimental Two Rotor Corvette to make production easier/cheaper/better. The Kelmark II had a large in-set hood scoop. The Kelmark GT went back to the smooth hood similar to what it used before on the Kelmark 1 GT.

=== Kelmark GT ===
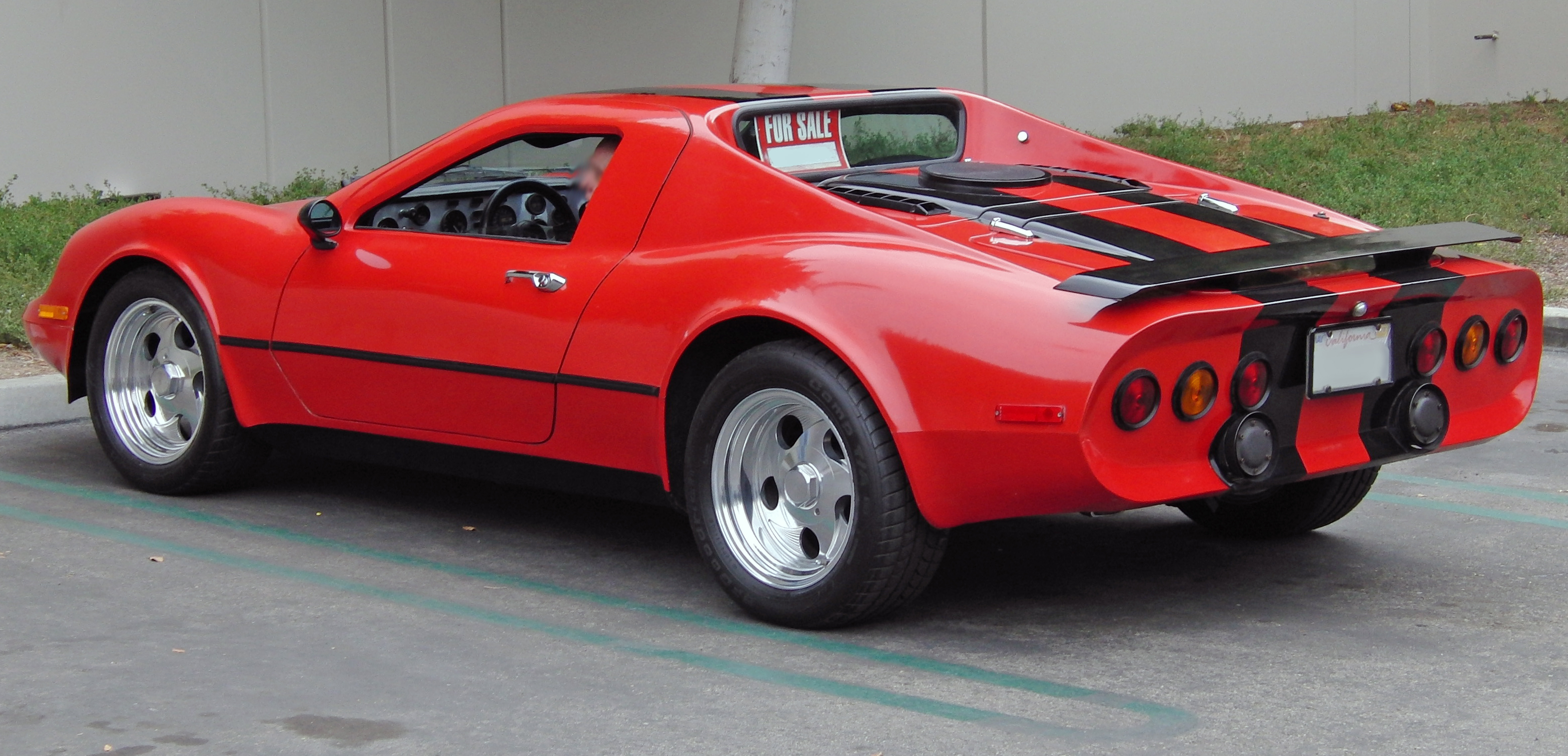
Rear view of a V8-engined Kelmark GT

The next model iteration after the Kelmark II GT. The Kelmark GT was featured in the magazine Car and Driver in 1977 and 1979. The final body design of the Kelmark GT, as well as the Kelmark II, was 5 inches wider than an original Ferrari-built Dino 246 GTS in order to allow it to fit over a VW chassis. The windshield came from a Ford Pinto, and the side glass was the rear windows of a Chevrolet Caprice/Impala turned backwards. The Kelmark GT was offered in the following packages and could be ordered as a basic kit, partially assembled, or turn-key automobile:

=== Kelmark GT Independence ===
A fiberglass body kit for a Standard Volkswagen Beetle chassis using a VW or Porsche Type 4 engine. Many used Hot Rod VW engines such as the 1679, 1835, 1915, 2076 and 2332cc displacement engines with twin carburetors for 'mild' to 'wild' performance increases. A few also utilized the Porsche 356 and Porsche 912 engines.

=== Kelmark GTS ===
The same as the Kelmark GT Independence except it was finished in metallic silver. Most had the optional rear high-rise scoop installed at the factory. This allowed clearance to install a Buick 231 Cubic inch V6 using an engine adapter to fit the VW transaxle, such as those sold by Kennedy Engineering.

=== Kelmark GT Liberator ===
More customized, and could be mounted on a tube frame, Porsche or heavily modified VW chassis or even a custom combination with Mazda Rotary, Chevy Corvair, Porsche 6, Buick V6 or small-block V8 power. It is estimated that only 200 Kelmark GTs were built as Liberator cars.

=== Kelmark GT Chairman ===
A fully loaded Kelmark GT with all luxury options such as leather interior, air conditioning, and high-end stereo equipment as offered by "Kelmark Motors" in Holt, Michigan. The cars were mostly powered by a rear engine, Buick 3.8 litre V6. This caused the car to be tail end heavy; which, unfortunately affected the handling of the car.

=== Kelmark Toronado GT ===
A big-block V8 "Super Car" utilizing a custom tube frame to accept an Oldsmobile Toronado drive unit mounted in the mid-engine position driving the rear wheels. Typically, these rare GTs were powered by the Olds 425 or 455 cubic inch (7.5 litre) engine. One of these models was outfitted with a highly tuned, Chevrolet big-block 454 cubic inch engine and was tested by Car and Driver and broke the 200 mph barrier. Thus, becoming the world's fastest street-legal sports car in 1977. Car & Driver reported this as the “Fastest documented speed ever attained by a street machine”, clocked at 202.7 by Car & Driver at the former Transportation Research Center in Ohio (now a part of Honda's US test facility). This proved the cars advanced aerodynamic and performance capabilities.

Bill Porterfield, a former Oldsmobile engineer, was responsible for the record breaking car. Later, he was the design engineer at GM for the Pontiac Fiero. He used a custom tubular frame built by his company Mid-Engineering. This special chassis utilized the Oldsmobile Toronado Turbo-Hydamatic 425 transaxle behind a 700 hp Chevrolet ZL-1, 454 big-block motor. The Mid-Engineering chassis used Chevrolet Corvette rear suspension arms and custom half shafts to allow wide performance tires. To put this accomplishment into perspective one should consider that it took Ferrari until March 1987 to come out with a 200 mph street legal sports car, the Ferrari F40. The F40 was a low production volume special which was not a mainstream Ferrari. Just a few months later Road and Track tested several specialty sports cars. The Ruf CTR Porsche 911 Yellow Bird and the Koenig RS Porsche 911; which, broke 200 mph. These two ran at 211 and 201 mph, respectively. Again, these were low volume custom sports cars. In these same tests, which were completed by Road and Track, with Le Mans winning Paul Frere and Formula One champ Phil Hill driving, the Ferrari Testarossa, Lamborghini Countach 5000S and AMG Hammer Mercedes-Benz 300E all failed to break 200 mph.
