= Gone in 60 Seconds (1974 film) =

1974 film by H. B. Halicki

- Theatrical release poster
- Directed by: H. B. Halicki
- Written by: H. B. Halicki
- Produced by: H. B. Halicki
- Starring: H. B. Halicki; Marion Busia; Jerry Daugirda; Ronald Halicki; Markos Kotsikos
- Cinematography: Jack Vacek
- Edited by: Warner E. Leighton
- Music by: Ronald Halicki; Philip Kachaturian
- Production company: H.B. Halicki Mercantile Company
- Distributed by: H.B. Halicki Far West Films-USA Distribution-International
- Release date: July 28, 1974 (United States)
- Running time: 105 minutes
- Country: United States
- Language: English
- Budget: $150,000
- Box office: $40 million

Gone in 60 Seconds is a 1974 American independent action film written, directed, produced by, and starring H. B. Halicki. The film centers on a group of car thieves and the fifty cars they must steal in a matter of days. It is known for featuring a 40-minute car chase scene, the longest in film history, during which a total of 93 cars were destroyed. The film is the first installment in the Gone in 60 Seconds film series.

Gone in 60 Seconds has become a cult film in the years since its release, and a loose remake with new characters and a different plot was released in 2000, starring Nicolas Cage and Angelina Jolie.

== Plot ==
Maindrian Pace is an insurance investigator who runs an automobile chop shop in Long Beach, California. He is also the leader of a professional car theft ring that steals and resells stolen cars, disguising them using vehicle identification numbers, engines, parts, and details (such as parking decals and bumper stickers) sourced from legitimately purchased wrecks. As an insurance industry insider, Pace has one idiosyncrasy: all vehicles stolen must be insured. He meets a South American drug lord who offers $200,000 up front, with an additional $200,000 upon delivery, in exchange for the thefts of 48 specific vehicles to be delivered to the Long Beach docks within five days.

The list ranges from limousines and semi-trailer trucks to vintage cars and exotics, rendering the order difficult to fill within the time limit. Mapping out a basic strategy, the thieves scout out their vehicular targets, all of which have been given woman code names. Chief among difficulties is a yellow 1973 Ford Mustang, codenamed "Eleanor". The first Eleanor that Pace comes across is occupied by its driver, so he steals it from the owner's house after dark and discovers it is owned by Harold Dwight Smith, a corrupt senior manager for a large insurance corporation.

An intoxicated Smith witnesses Eleanor being stolen from his garage and attempts to pursue Pace in a different car but is stopped by the police; Pace quickly returns the Mustang to Smith's home to make it look like the car was never stolen and that Smith was simply out on a drunken joyride. Further tension occurs when a white Cadillac Eldorado—stolen as part of the order—is found to contain several kilograms of heroin stashed in its trunk. Pace's brother-in-law, Eugene, sees the heroin as a profitable side business, but Pace disagrees, viewing the heroin as a threat to the security of the operation. Against Eugene's protests, Pace does not relinquish the heroin and, unbeknownst to Eugene, has the Cadillac and its contents burned.

The thefts of all 48 vehicles are completed, but the second Eleanor is discovered to be uninsured within hours of delivery to the docks. After pleas from fiancée Pumpkin Chase, Pace agrees to return it, but only because he is aware of a third Eleanor at the International Towers in Long Beach. Meanwhile, Eugene, learning of the Cadillac's fate, confronts Pace and angrily leaves, tipping off the police about Pace and the third Eleanor. As a result of the tip-off, two detectives, both part of unit 1-Baker-11, corner Pace as he exits the International Towers. A lengthy and destructive car chase ensues, covering six California cities from Long Beach to Carson involving local, county, and state law enforcement. Pace evades 1-Baker-11 and the police but irreparably damages the third Eleanor in the process.

Desperate, Pace spots a fourth Eleanor Mustang at a car wash. He leaves the third Eleanor at the car wash and tricks the owner of the Mustang into leaving it to go talk with the manager. Pace leaves the car wash with the fourth Eleanor, leaving the wrecked third Eleanor. It is promptly also revealed that the third Eleanor belonged to a radio DJ at the International Towers, who had unknowingly been commentating over the pursuit of his own stolen car. The police, spotting the wrecked Mustang, descend upon the scene to mistakenly arrest the car wash manager, as Pace clears a police checkpoint in the fourth Eleanor when the cops let him go once they learn the dragnet is cancelled as they caught the suspect. Shortly after, Pace encounters a group of intoxicated, bungling men in their Cadillac lowrider, nicknamed "Billy", that he had previously run off the road and wrecked during the aforementioned chase. Pace speeds off when the men's now barely-functioning car breaks down and catches on fire, to their dismay.

== Cast ==
Actor	Role
H. B. "Toby" Halicki	Maindrian Pace
Marion Busia	Pumpkin Chase
Jerry Daugirda	Eugene Chase
James McIntyre	Stanley "Staś" Chase
George Cole	Atlee Jackson
Ronald Halicki	Corlis Pace
Markos Kotsikos	Uncle Joe Chase
Parnelli Jones	Himself
Gary Bettenhausen	Himself
Jonathan E. Fricke	Himself / K-Fox Interviewer
Hal McClain	Himself / K-Fox Announcer
J. C. Agajanian	Himself
J. C. Agajanian, Jr.	Light Blue Unmarked Detective
Christopher J.C. Agajanian	Himself
Billy Englehart	Billy
Sak Yamamoto	Himself / City of Carson Mayor
The City Council, City of Carson	Themselves
Anthony Cole	Lowrider
Michael Cole	Lowrider
Mark Cole	Lowrider
Ron Simmons	Lowrider
Don Simmons	Lowrider
Edward Booker	Lowrider
Butch Stockton	1-Baker-11 Detective Driver
Phil Woods	1-Baker-11 Detective Passenger
Terence H. Winkless	Lyle Waggoner's Car Cleaner (uncredited)
Wally Burr	Male Police Dispatcher (uncredited)
Edward Abrahms	Harold Dwight Smith (uncredited)
1971 Ford Mustang Sportsroof	1973 Ford Mustang Mach 1 "Eleanor"

== Production ==
Gone in 60 Seconds is an independent film. H. B. Halicki wrote, starred, directed, produced and even did his own stunt work in the film. In a contemporary context, the portions of the film preceding the chase sequences are generally seen as on par with a period B-film. Halicki employed family and friends (instead of professional actors) to play parts in his film to keep the budget low. The characters depicted as being members of the emergency services were actual police officers, firemen, or paramedics. The then-mayor of Carson, California, Sak Yamamoto, also appears as himself.

All of the police cars damaged in the film, the garbage truck that overturns, three fire trucks (including two waiting for the cars to clear, and another one stopping to put out a fire) were bought at city auction by Halicki in 1972, for an average price of $200 each. Everything sat in an empty lot for over a year until production began in 1973. The fire trucks seen on the Vincent Thomas Bridge during the main chase were real Long Beach FD units on their way to an actual emergency call. The "crash" staged for the film blocked both lanes, preventing the trucks from proceeding until the cars were cleared. Halicki asked the camera crew to film them in case he found a place and time to fit the shots into the film.

There was no official script, apart from several pages outlining main dialog sequences. Much of the action/dialog was improvised and ad-libbed by the cast and crew as they went along. This caused many problems for the editor, Warner E. Leighton, who never knew what footage was being dumped on him or where in the film it belonged. In the DVD audio commentary, he described the script for the construction site scenes of the main pursuit as a piece of cardboard with a circle on it. Halicki pointed at it and said: "That's the dust bowl. We went around it twice. There's your script".

The pursuit is the longest car chase (40 minutes) in film history and takes place through five cities as he attempts to lose police. Nearly every civilian vehicle seen in close proximity to the main chase (especially in downtown Long Beach) was owned by Halicki. This resulted in several cars appearing multiple times in the 40-minute sequence. The intact "Eleanor" used for beauty shots and the white 1968 Ford Custom used by Pace and Stanley can be seen parked in a few Long Beach sequences.

=== Locations ===
The workshop scenes at Chase Research were filmed at Halicki's real-life workshop. Occasionally, filming would stop for several days so he could repair cars to earn money and continue production. The building on the waterfront where the vehicles were apparently stored was only used for the outside shot of the building. The final jump was filmed at 190th Street and Green Lane in Redondo Beach, California.

=== Real accidents ===
The film's opening scene captures the aftermath of a real-life train derailment that was not part of the original shooting script; when Halicki heard about this, he wanted to incorporate it into the film.

In one scene at the construction area, a patrol car roars up a hill in pursuit and overturns. This was not planned; the driver inside was nearly crushed when the siren "can" on the roof caved the roof in. The scene was left in the finished film.

J. C. Agajanian Jr., who plays a detective in the roadblock sequence at Torrance Mazda Agency, was almost hit when Halicki missed his braking mark, hitting one of the unmarked Plymouth Belvedere patrol cars, sending it careening towards Agajanian, who missed it by quick reflexes and luck. The near collision was left in the film and is very apparent.

The scene where "Eleanor" is rear-ended by a Cadillac Eldorado on the northbound Harbor Freeway (then-signed as California State Highway 11 and later as Interstate 110) at the Carson Street exit, and spins into a light pole at 100 mph, was a real accident. Halicki was badly hurt, and filming was stopped while he recovered. According to people on the set, the first thing Halicki said when he regained consciousness was, "Did we get coverage?" Filming resumed three weeks later, with Halicki finishing the rest of the film in a full leg cast and several broken ribs.

=== Stunts ===
The Ford Country Squire station wagon that flips during the earlier night-time chase in Torrance was overturned by six men lifting it up from one side. The film was later skip-framed to create the desired effect.

The garbage truck that overturns was pulled by cables attached to two tow trucks. The cables attached to the top of the truck are clearly visible as it topples.

To achieve the effect of cars sliding into each other at Moran Cadillac, an oil slick was placed under the tires of the first car to assist it in sliding. According to the commentary track on the DVD, the film company owned the first two Cadillacs in the row; the remaining belonged to the dealer. When it came time to do the stunt, the oil trick worked too well—many of the agency's own Cadillacs were badly damaged. Halicki had to purchase all of them.

The jump scene at the end of the chase is notable and set the standards for a number of subsequent pictures. Acting as the climax to the lengthy chase sequence, the "Eleanor" jump managed to achieve a height of 30' over a 128' distance, a feat rarely attempted today without CGI or a gas-driven catapult (as was used to jump the General Lee in the 2005 film remake of "The Dukes of Hazzard").

Halicki compacted ten vertebrae performing this jump. The injury was not serious, although director of photography Jack Vacek said that Halicki "never walked the same again".

=== General public as extras ===
With the exception of a few cast extras, the bulk of the bystanders in the film are the general public going about their business. This caused several incidents wherein people assumed a real police pursuit was in progress, with many trying to help the accident "victims". For example, in the scene at the Carson Street off-ramp, where the two cars collide after Maindrian drives against traffic, a pedestrian can be seen in the background shouting angrily at the passing police cars for not stopping to help the occupants. Much of the crowd at the gas station, where Harold Smith is pulled over after the nighttime Torrance chase, were part of a real biker gang who verbally abused the police officers "arresting" the actor and demanded they leave him alone.

Ronald Halicki, the director's real-life brother who played Corlis Pace in the film, operated the crane that lifted "Jill", the red Challenger, to its fate in the car-crusher at the junkyard.

=== Inside jokes ===
When Maindrian is first telling Atlee about the new contract, a message on the blackboard behind them says, "Sgt. Hawkins called about Vacek case"—a reference to director of photography Jack Vacek. The license plate of the Rolls-Royce outside the airport reads, "HBH", the initials of the film's star/director/writer, H. B. Halicki.

When Pumpkin tells Maindrian that they have to give "Eleanor" back because the car is not insured, Maindrian reads the owner's address from a newspaper: 18511 S. Mariposa Ave, Gardena. This was, in fact, Halicki's home address at the time.

Early in the film, when the boys are stripping down the Challenger, they are conversing about how Atlee became a "professional". Atlee says: "Butch Stockton was a professional and he got caught". Butch Stockton is the driver of 1-Baker-11 in the film.

== Vehicles ==
#	Years	Automobiles	Codes
1	1974	Cadillac Fleetwood Seventy-Five	Marion
2	1974	Cadillac Fleetwood 75	Barbara
3	1973	Cadillac Fleetwood 75	Lindsey
4	1972	Cadillac Fleetwood 75	Dianne
5	1971	Cadillac Fleetwood 75	Nicole
6	1972	Cadillac Fleetwood 75	Ruby
7	1972	Lincoln Continental	Julie
8	1971	Freightliner WFT 6364	Frances
9	1973	Cadillac Coupe DeVille	Mary
10	1973	Mercedes-Benz 450SE	Joanne
11	1930	Studebaker Dictator	Beverly
12	1974	Cadillac Coupe DeVille	Patricia
13	1974	Lincoln Continental Mark IV	Ruth
14	1927	Citroën B14 Conduite	Elizabeth
15	1971	Rolls-Royce Silver Shadow	Terri
16	1924	Rolls-Royce Silver Ghost	Eileen
17	1972	Plymouth Barracuda	Susan
18	1970	Jaguar E-Type	Claudia
19	1959	Rolls-Royce Phantom V	Rosie
20	1970	Rolls-Royce Silver Shadow	Maria
21	1972	Ferrari Daytona 365 GTB/4	Sharon
22	1970	Rolls-Royce Silver Shadow	Kathy
23	1953	Chrysler Coupe Elegance	Alice
24	1973	Cadillac Fleetwood Station Wagon	Leona
25	1971	Rolls-Royce Silver Shadow	Kelly
26	1971	Cadillac Eldorado	Nancy
27	1973	Jensen Interceptor	Betty
28	1971	Citroën SM	Patti
29	1962	Ferrari 340 America	Judy
30	1966	Rolls-Royce Silver Cloud II	Carey
31	1966	Rolls-Royce Silver Cloud III	Jackie
32	1973	Cadillac Eldorado	Laurie
33	1972	Maserati Ghibli Coupe	Sandy
34	1971	Chevrolet Vega	Christy
35	1969	Chevrolet Corvette Stingray	Michelle
36	1967	Lamborghini Miura	Tracy
37	1969	De Tomaso Mangusta	Marilyn
38	1971	De Tomaso Pantera	Maxine
39	1968	Intermeccanica Italia GFX	Lorna
40	1971	Chevrolet Corvette Stingray	Jean
41	1949	Ferrari V12	Paula
42	1966	Lotus Europa S1	Renee
43	1974	Manta Mirage	Annie
44	1971	Ford "Big Oly" Bronco	Janet
45	1972	Stutz Blackhawk	Karen
46	1957	Mercedes-Benz 300SL	Dorothy
47	1973	Stutz Blackhawk	Donna
48	1973	Ford Mustang	Eleanor

== Release ==
=== Home media ===
The original version of the film was released on video in the early 1980s twice: by Full Throttle Video and again by Media Home Entertainment. Other releases followed in 1989 again by Media Home Entertainment but the significance was that it had Hi-Fi audio. In 1990, Video Treasures released the last VHS version to include the original soundtrack. This release was on LP duplicated tape and did not include HI-FI audio. All other releases were released as SP mode tape as some sleeves had a SP mode sticker on the front of the jacket.

In 2000, Denice Shakarian Halicki and her business partner Michael Leone, under the banner Halicki Films, released the 25th anniversary remastered edition on DVD and VHS to American viewers. This special remastered edition contained a restored digital print of the film from the original 35mm masters, however all of the original music was replaced, due to rights issues, as were the sound effects and some dialog was even modified. In May 2005, a Region 2 DVD was released in Europe.

The pre-release version of the film can be seen (albeit in still frame form) on the 25th Anniversary DVD. By accessing the hidden "Easter Egg", one can watch an older version of the film, which contains many deleted scenes in the film's first half. At this time it is unknown whether this version will ever be released to the public in full form.

In the Speed Channel broadcast of the film, a 2002 documentary, hosted by Denice Halicki, is shown before the beginning of the film. The documentary described the production processes of the films produced by H.B. Halicki as well as his life.

In October 2012, Denice Halicki and Leone, under the banner Halicki Films, released the Gone in 60 seconds DVD/Blu-ray combo pack. It includes a rare interview with Lee Iacocca.

== Spin-offs ==
In 1977, a follow-up of sorts, titled Double Nickels, was released featuring most of the cast and crew from Gone in 60 Seconds including Jack Vacek, Ed Abrams, George Cole, and Mick Brennan, who would work for Halicki in his next two films, The Junkman and Deadline Auto Theft. Tony Syslo was the same cinematographer who later worked on those films, as well. Halicki received a special thanks credit in the film.

== Attempted sequel ==
On June 9, 1989, Toby and Denice Halicki began to shoot the sequel Gone in 60 Seconds 2, which would star them both. The sequel would not have the same storyline of 1974 film; Toby Halicki wanted a bigger story about a professional international thief. He bought over 400 cars to destroy for the film.

On August 20, while filming in Dunkirk and Buffalo, New York, Halicki was preparing for a dramatic stunt sequence in the film, during which a 160 ft. (49 m) tall water tower was supposed to topple to the ground. When a cable attached to the tower snapped unexpectedly, it sheared off a telephone pole, which fell on Halicki, killing him instantly.

Halicki's estate faced a number of legal challenges regarding the film's intellectual property. After seven trials, in 1994 the court released Halicki's films and the associated copyrights to Denice Shakarian Halicki, but she was forced to sell her husband's car and toy collection to pay the legal fees. Halicki planned to finish her late husband's dream and make a new Gone in 60 Seconds film based on the unfinished film.

== Remake ==
In 1995, Denice Shakarian Halicki licensed the property which was remade as Gone in 60 Seconds (2000) with Disney (under their Touchstone Pictures banner) and Jerry Bruckheimer. "Eleanor" reprised its role as a grey customized 1967 Ford Mustang. The plot, however, differs greatly from the original, starring Nicolas Cage as Randall "Memphis" Raines, a veteran car thief who must steal 50 cars for a gangster to ensure his brother is not killed.

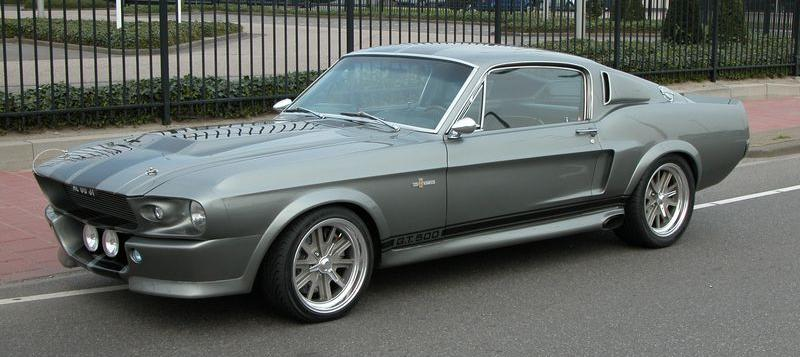
1967 custom Fastback Mustang Eleanor from the 2000 Gone in 60 Seconds

== Legacy ==
Thanks to the popularity of the remake, a number of car shops started to produce "Eleanor" reproductions. Denice Halicki claimed to own the copyrights to the car as a "character", including its various body styles and likenesses, and filed lawsuits preventing unlicensed look-a-likes or copies of the 1967 Ford Mustang fastback, including one 2008 suit against Carroll Shelby, which she won. These lawsuits sparked controversy among many in the car community, but in a 2022 follow-up suit filed by the Shelby Trust, the United States District Court for the Central District of California invalidated these claims, ruling that the assertion that Eleanor was a distinctive character was "an invention of overzealous advocacy", and that the car was "not entitled to standalone copyright protection as a matter of law".

== See also ==
- List of American films of 1974
- List of cult films
