= H. B. Halicki =

American filmmaker and actor (1940–1989)

- Halicki in Gone in 60 Seconds, 1974
- Born: Henry Blight Halicki; October 18, 1940; Dunkirk, New York, U.S.
- Died: August 20, 1989 (aged 48); Tonawanda, New York, U.S.
- Other names: Hank Halicki; The Car Crash King; The Junkman; Toby Halicki; Tony Halicki; Henry Bernard Halicki (per birth announcement)
- Years active: 1972–1989
- Spouse: Denice Shakarian Halicki (m. 1989)
- Website: gonein60seconds.com

Henry Blight "Toby" Halicki (October 18, 1940 – August 20, 1989) was an American director, writer, stunt driver, actor, and filmmaker. He directed the 1974 film Gone in 60 Seconds as well as producing and starring in several other action films. He was killed in an accident while filming Gone in 60 Seconds 2 in 1989. His widow, Denice Shakarian Halicki, produced a remake of Gone in 60 Seconds in 2000 with Jerry Bruckheimer.

== Biography ==
Halicki was born in Dunkirk, New York, on October 18, 1940, the son of John Halicki and his second wife, Angeline Blazejewicz, both Polish Americans. His middle name was listed as Bernard in his birth announcement. His father, originally from Austria, was an auto mechanic and automobile salesman, and opened his own repair shop, Halicki Garage, in 1919. Halicki was one of thirteen children, some of whom were half-siblings from his father's first marriage to Caroline Turek; his brothers were Rudolph, Frank, Bud, Ron, Edward, Joseph, and John and his sisters were Angeline, Allegra, Helen, Caroline, and Tara.

Halicki moved from New York to California and worked on vehicles, eventually owning his own impound and towing business. H.B. Halicki Mercantile Co. & Junk Yard was known for its extensive antique automobile and toy collections.

=== Gone in 60 Seconds ===
Halicki wrote, directed, produced, and starred in the film Gone in 60 Seconds in 1974. There was no official script for the movie, apart from several pages outlining main dialog sequences. Halicki supplied most of the cars and used repeated footage of the same vehicles and shots of public incidents to increase the footage. The scene in which a train derailment is observed was not part of the original shooting script; it is in fact a real train that derailed. When the director heard about the wreck, he wanted to incorporate it into the film.

Halicki compacted 10 vertebrae performing the film's 128-foot-long (39 m) jump finale and walked with a limp afterwards.

=== Marriage, Gone in 60 Seconds 2 and death ===
Halicki met Denice Shakarian, an Armenian American, in 1983. They dated for six years, before marrying on May 11, 1989. After returning from their honeymoon, he began filming his 1989 sequel, Gone in 60 Seconds 2, in which both of them would star – Halicki as car thief Colt and Shakarian as computer guru / thief Alaska Wells. After Halicki's death, Shakarian began dating her third cousin, Robert Kardashian, best known for representing O. J. Simpson.

Halicki bought over 400 automobiles to destroy in the film, which was to feature improved car chases and storyline.

On August 20, 1989, while filming in Dunkirk and Buffalo, New York, Halicki was preparing for the most dramatic stunt sequence in the film, during which a 160-foot-tall (49 m) water tower was supposed to topple to the ground. When a cable attached to the tower snapped unexpectedly, it sheared off a telephone pole, which fell on Halicki, killing him instantly. The accident occurred in an area behind the former J.H. Williams Tool factory at 400 Vulcan Street in Buffalo.

== Filmography ==
Year	Film	Role	Notes
1972	Love Me Deadly	Race Driver	Actor, associate producer
1974	Gone in 60 Seconds	Maindrian "Vicinski" Pace	Actor, producer, writer, director, stunt driver
1982	The Junkman	Harlan B. Hollis / Maindrian "Vicinski" Pace	Actor, producer, writer, director, stunt driver
1982	The Making of the Junkman	Himself / Host	Documentary
1983	Deadline Auto Theft	Maindrian "Vicinski" Pace	Actor, producer, writer, director, stunt driver
1988	Deadly Addiction	Rolls-Royce Driver	Actor
1989	Gone in 60 Seconds 2	Colt	Unfinished film; accidentally killed during filming
2003	The Life and Times of H.B. Halicki	Himself	Archive footage, documentary
