= Viharo =

Viharo is a surname. Notable people with the surname include:

- Robert Viharo (born 1942), American actor
- Will Viharo, American author
