= Thrillville (disambiguation) =

Thrillville is a video game developed by LucasArts.

Thrillville may also refer to:

- Thrillville: Off the Rails, the sequel to Thrillville
- Thrillville (theater event), a monthly cabaret style movie theater event based in Oakland, California, and dedicated to cult and B-movies
- Thrill-Ville USA, an amusement park in Turner, Oregon, which closed in 2007

== See also ==
- Trillville, an American hip-hop group
