= Gemini (play) =

Play by Albert Innaurato

- Original language: English
- Written by: Albert Innaurato
- Genre: Comedy
- Setting: South Philadelphia

Premiere
- Date: December 8, 1976
- Place: Playwrights Horizons; New York City

Gemini is a 1976 American play by Albert Innaurato that became the fourth longest-running non-musical play in Broadway history.

== Plot ==
Set in the backyard of a blue-collar neighborhood in South Philadelphia early in the summer of 1973, the comedy-drama focuses on the 21st birthday celebration of Harvard student Francis Geminiani. In attendance are his divorced father Fran and Fran's widowed girlfriend Lucille, next-door neighbor Bunny Weinberger and her overweight son Herschel, and Francis' classmates, the wealthy WASP Hastings siblings; Judith (who seeks romance with Francis) and Randy (the object of Francis' unexpressed affection), who have arrived unexpectedly, much to their friend's dismay. All are dysfunctional to varying degrees, and the interactions among them provide the play with its comic and dramatic moments.

== Production history ==
Playwrights Horizons first staged the play in December 1976 with a cast that included Jonathan Hadary, Jon Polito, and Kathleen Turner . The following March it was mounted by the Circle Repertory Company with Hadary (Herschel Weinberger), Jessica James (Bunny), Danny Aiello (Fran), Anne De Salvo (Lucille), Carol Potter (Judith Hastings), and Robert Picardo (Francis Geminiani). Critical response encouraged the producers to transfer the play to Broadway.

The Broadway production, with the same cast directed by Peter Mark Schifter and supervised by Marshall W. Mason, opened on May 21, 1977 at the Little Theatre and closed on September 6, 1981 after 1,819 performances.

A 1980 screen adaptation, written and directed by Richard Benner, was titled Happy Birthday, Gemini. The cast included Madeline Kahn, Rita Moreno, Robert Viharo, Alan Rosenberg, David Marshall Grant, and Sarah Holcomb.

Showtime created a "staged for video" version for cable television in 1982, starring Danny Aiello (Fran), Anne De Salvo (Lucille), and Scott Baio (Francis).

A 1999 off-Broadway Second Stage Theatre revival closed after 14 performances.

== Critical reception ==
According to theatre scholar Jordan Schildcrout, many critics praised the performances of Aiello, De Salvo, and James, finding that "Innaurato depicted his larger-than-life supporting characters with such force that they often threatened to take over the play." Crucial to the success of the play was a 30-second television commercial that aired in the New York area, inviting audiences to the "party" and introducing each character with notable catchphrases such as "Take human bites!" and "I'm not hungry; I'll just pick." Although Gemini was denied a single Tony Award nomination, it was popular with audiences who "didn't fit the traditional profile of Broadway playgoers" and became the fourth longest-running non-musical play in Broadway history.

== Awards and nominations ==
1977 Off-Broadway

- Obie Award

Anne DeSalvo – performance – winner
Danny Aiello- performance – winner
Albert Innaurato – playwriting – winner

1977 Broadway

Drama Desk Award for Outstanding New American Play – nomination
