= Wenceslas Square (play) =

1988 play by Larry Shue

- Original language: English
- Written by: Larry Shue
- Characters: The Men; Vince Corey; Dooley; The Women
- Genre: Dramatic comedy
- Setting: Czechoslovakia, 1974

Premiere
- Date: March 2, 1988
- Place: The Public Theater Martinson Theater Stage

Wenceslas Square is a 1988 play by Larry Shue. It is semi-autobiographical, and more serious in tone than his usual farces, such as The Foreigner and The Nerd. The title refers to the historical plaza, one of the main city squares and a cultural center of the New Town of Prague, Czech Republic.

== Background ==
In the late 1960s, Dr. Nicholas Howey visited the Czechoslovak Socialist Republic with Larry Shue to study repertory theater practice in Prague during the Russian occupation in the late 1960s, when the nation was regarded as a satellite state in the Soviet sphere of interest. His observations provided material for his 1969 book, Who's Afraid of Franz Kafka: An Introduction to Theatre Activity in Czechoslovakia. Dr. Howey later wrote, "Although political turmoil resulted in cancelling publication, that experience resulted in the story being told (rather humorously) in the Broadway play WENCESLAS SQUARE, written by Larry Shue, produced by the New York Shakespeare Festival and directed by Jerry Zaks."

== Plot summary ==
BroadwayWorld summarizes the play and its 21st-century legacy: "A minimalist cautionary tale based on the political suppression of late 1960s Czech theatre artists previously involved in 'theatre as revolution,' this semi-autobiographical 'memory' play ... finds an American professor and his drama student confronting oppression and ruthlessness. The play parallels the Ukraine political unrest that has given way to Russian invasion."

== Characters ==
- Narrator – other Male Characters: The Narrator is an older version of Dooley.
- Vince Corey: A Professor.
- Dooley: A Student and Photographer.
- All the Female Characters.

== Production history ==
The play was presented by the New York Shakespeare Festival (Joseph Papp, producer) at The Public Theater/Martinson Theatre Stage in New York City. Directed by Jerry Zaks, the cast members were Victor Garber, Jonathan Hadary, Bruce Norris and Dana Ivey. Following its March/April 1988 New York run, the play transferred to the John F. Kennedy Center for the Performing Arts in Washington, D.C. for a July/August limited engagement.

Chicago's Body Politic Theatre presented the play in April/May 1989. It was directed by Tom Mula, with a cast that included Gary Houston, Jeffrey Hutchinson, Larry Brandenburg and Maureen Gallagher; Larry Shue's "last play" was first produced in 1984, as part of the Chicago Theatre Project's season of new plays, in the Theatre Building Chicago. Tom Mula directed that premiere, also with Gary Houston and Jeffrey Hutchinson along with Barbara E. Robertson and Rick Snyder, under the guidance of Larry Shue.

The play was presented at the Los Angeles Matrix Theatre in a July/August 1989 production. It received a Los Angeles Drama Critics Circle Award for distinguished achievement during the 1989-1990 season; honoring the play, playwright and an award to Nancy Lenehan for her performance. The cast also included: James Sloyan, Adam Arkin and Richard Murphy. It was directed by Lee Shallat Chemel.

New York City's Metropolitan Playhouse produced the play as part of its 1993–94 season. It was directed by David Zarko.

Cesear's Forum, Cleveland's minimalist theatre at Playhouse Square, presented the play in a September/October 2022 production at Kennedy's Down Under. Directed by Greg Cesear, the play utilized seven actors, shifting the balance of role-playing.

== Critical reception ==
In his The New York Times review of a 1988 production at The Public Theater, Frank Rich concluded: "The result, at best sporadically funny but always warm and spirited, is hardly a profound play."

Reviewing a 1989 production at Body Politic Theatre, Diana Spinrad in Chicago Reader wrote: "Once the Czechs were passionate and headstrong; now they must whisper their political sympathies if they are to survive. Larry Shue's play is one man's discovery of that truth. His portrait of oppression is not shocking or revolutionary. It makes no political statement that we haven't seen many times over. But it is truthful and heartfelt, and doesn't pretend that it's more than it is, a haunting personal memory. The autobiographical Wenceslas Square is based on a trip Shue took to Czechoslovakia with Dr. Nicholas Howey. Some details have been changed for dramatic purposes, but the whole thing smacks of remembrance."

Reviewing a 2022 production in Cesear's Forum, Cleveland Scene's Christine Howey noted the relevance of the story in light of the Russian invasion of Ukraine. She wrote, "In this quiet and somewhat meandering 2 1/2-hour piece, playwright Shue uses his trademark sense of humor to bring some lightness to this essentially dark story of a city gone dead."
