= Anne De Salvo =

American actress (born 1949)

- Born: April 3, 1949 (age 77); Philadelphia, Pennsylvania, United States
- Occupations: Actress; screenwriter; director
- Years active: 1977–present

Anne De Salvo (sometimes spelled Anne DeSalvo; born April 3, 1949) is an American actress and filmmaker. She has been described as "one of the top character actresses of her generation".

== Life and career ==
Growing up in Overbrook, Philadelphia, De Salvo studied art at Temple University and became involved with theater in Boston, where she was working as an art teacher. She had her breakout with the role of Lucille Pompi in the Albert Innaurato's drama play Gemini, for which she received an Obie Award for Distinguished Performance by an Actress in 1977. At the time, Variety described her performance as "near perfection", as she "nearly steals every scene she's in".

Often playing "wise-cracking New York characters", among De Salvo's best known roles are Woody Allen's sister in Stardust Memories, and Vicky DeStefano, Tony Danza's fiancée in Taxi. In 1991, she co-starred alongside Ray Sharkey in the ABC sitcom The Man in the Family. In 1997, she received a CableACE Award nomination for her guest starring role in Lifetime Women's Festival: Women Without Implants. In 2001, De Salvo made her screenwriting and directorial debut with The Amati Girls.

== Selected filmography ==
=== Films ===
- Stardust Memories (1980)
- Arthur (1981)
- My Favorite Year (1982)
- D.C. Cab (1983)
- Bad Manners (1984)
- Perfect (1985)
- Compromising Positions (1985)
- Burglar (1987)
- Spike of Bensonhurst (1988)
- Fear, Anxiety & Depression (1989)
- Taking Care of Business (1990)
- Dead in the Water (1991)
- Attack of the 5 Ft. 2 In. Women (1994)
- Radioland Murders (1994)
- Hi-Life (1998)
- One Hot Summer Night (1998)
- The Amati Girls (2001, also director and screenwriter)
- Kalamazoo? (2006)
- The Wishing Well (2009)

=== Television ===
- Ryan's Hope (recurring role, 1981)
- Muggable Mary, Street Cop (1982)
- Taxi (recurring role, 1982–83)
- Wiseguy (recurring role, 1989)
- Cheers (recurring role, 1989–90)
- The Man in the Family (main role, 1991)
- The X-Files (ep. The Erlenmeyer Flask, 1994)
