= Larry Shue =

American dramatist (1946–1985)

- Born: July 23, 1946; New Orleans, Louisiana
- Died: September 23, 1985 (aged 39); Grottoes, Virginia
- Occupations: Playwright, actor
- Writing career
- Years active: 1972–1985
- Notable works: The Nerd, The Foreigner

Larry Howard Shue (July 23, 1946 – September 23, 1985) was an American playwright and actor, best known for writing two oft-performed farces, The Nerd and The Foreigner.

An Alley Theatre essayist wrote in a 2024 retrospective, "Playwrights and actors alike continue to draw inspiration from his comedic style." The BroadwayWorld website says similarly that Shue "made a significant impact on the theater world before his untimely death in a plane crash in 1985."

== Early life and education ==
Larry Shue and his older sister, Jackie, were born in New Orleans, Louisiana to Percy H. Shue and (Marguerite) Dolores Dye Shue, and grew up in Kansas and Glen Ellyn, Illinois.

His father Percy, a native of Virginia, received a Bachelor of Arts from Berea College in Kentucky, and his Master of Arts from Tulane University, New Orleans, where he became a professor on the Dept. of English faculty for four years. Mr. Shue joined the 87th Infantry Division during World War II. After the war, he did graduate study at Johns Hopkins University in Baltimore. Accepting a job in Eureka, Kansas, he worked as Director of the Midwest Institute of Business Administration and Kiwanis Governor for the Kansas District in 1958 (later Director of Program Development for Kiwanis International).

In her youth, Larry's mother Dolores was a professional ballroom dancer and an avid tap dancer for most of her life; she taught Spanish at Glenbard West High School in Glen Ellyn for 25 years, retiring in 1986. Dolores was also a member of the Daughters of the American Revolution.

The Alley Theatre comedy critic wrote, "Larry Shue was raised in a household that valued humor and creativity. He developed a keen sense of observation and a love for making people laugh. Little did he know that these early experiences would shape his future as a renowned playwright." His parents' lives did influence his works; the characters he invented include soldiers, veterans, professors, students, and performing artists.

Larry Shue graduated cum laude from Illinois Wesleyan University, where he received a Bachelor of Fine Arts. He served in the United States Army at Fort Lee, Virginia from 1968 to 1972. He worked in repertory theater and on the New York stage, and starred in early performances of The Nerd and The Foreigner.

Shue married Linda Faye Wilson in 1968; they were divorced in 1977.

His friend Amlin Gray, also a playwright, told an interviewer, "What was really remarkable about Larry is people who know his plays really know him." After Shue's death, Gray married Shue's sister Jackie.

== Career ==
Shue began his career as a professional actor and playwright with the Harlequin Dinner Theatre in both Washington, D.C., and Atlanta, Georgia. John Dillon, artistic director at the renowned Milwaukee Repertory Theater, saw him performing and offered him a job.

He enthusiastically began his life at the Rep with the role of the sailor Joe in the 1980 premiere of Lakeboat by David Mamet. An impressed Mamet dedicated the play to Shue and Dillon. Shue also played the role of Donny Dubrow in a 1983 run of Mamet's American Buffalo at the Marcus Performing Arts Center's Todd Wehr Theater in Milwaukee.

Although Shue thought of himself primarily as an experienced actor, Dillon knew he had written skits and short plays since college. Shue was reluctant to show his writing at a professional level, but Dillon encouraged him with "loving bullying." Shue told an interviewer in 1984 that he found writing unpleasant. "The thing that gets these plays written is stomach-churning fear. They are selling the tickets for the play, so I know I must finish it. I worry about it all the time." However, he also said, "The end result is so much fun. I try to write all the parts like I would want to play them." Milwaukee Rep actor James Pickering, for whom Shue wrote the lead character in The Nerd, said, "As you can tell from Larry's plays, he had an extremely active verbal imagination. His skill at writing comedy was hard-wired into him. It was in his DNA." Shue wrote much of his comedy on a bench overlooking Lake Michigan and Milwaukee's Central Library.

Shue's two best-known comedy plays were written and first performed while he was playwright-in-residence at the Milwaukee Repertory Theater:

- The Nerd premiered in April 1981, and was produced successfully in London's West End. It transferred to Broadway in 1987. It is a character-based comedy in which a dinner party, interrupted by a houseguest from hell who plans to stay indefinitely, dissolves into insanity.
- The Foreigner premiered on January 13, 1983, and transferred to Off-Broadway. The central character is Charlie Baker, who, while on a vacation in a Georgia hunting lodge, pretends not to be able to understand English, so as to avoid the attentions of the other guests. His plan backfires and he soon finds himself the confidant of everyone there, especially a debutante who is unhappy with her engagement and her slow-witted brother, who thinks he is teaching Charlie English. Charlie ends up having to foil the schemes of the local xenophobic Ku Klux Klan chapter without revealing his secret.

The off-Broadway production of The Foreigner resulted in two Obie awards in 1985, to Jerry Zaks for direction and Anthony Heald for performance. From the Outer Critics Circle, it received the John Gassner Playwriting Award (presented for an American play, preferably by a new playwright) and the award for Outstanding Off-Broadway Play.

His other work includes:

- Grandma Duck Is Dead (1984) (Note: The publication date, in the Dramatists Play Service printing, is given as 1984. The University of Wisconsin–Milwaukee Manuscript Collection, which holds Shue's papers, contains the play in their 1978-1979 file.) – A long one-act play about the antics of graduating seniors in a college dormitory in 1968. The Chicago Reader said, "As drawer plays go, this early work by the author of The Foreigner and The Nerd about college-buddy bonding is pretty good. The usual treacle about having to grow up and move on is nicely contrasted with some genuinely inventive plotting and some amusing situations."
- My Emperor's New Clothes: A Musical Play for Children (1985) – A popular, often-revived one-act musical comedy set in the kingdom of Mango-Chutney, full of slapstick and based on the Hans Christian Andersen story "The Emperor's New Clothes." A Los Angeles Times reviewer describes the proceedings: "The recipe for success in children's theater contains only two main ingredients: Get the youngsters involved in the show through interaction and throw in a few chuckles for the older audience members."
- Wenceslas Square (1988) – set in 1974 Prague after the Soviet invasion of 1968

Shue's film appearances include the shorts A Common Confusion; Another Town; and The Land of the Blind: or The Hungry Leaves; and the feature-length Sweet Liberty. He played the role of the Doctor in the TV movie O. Henry's Christmas, in the episode "The Last Leaf," based on the short story of the same title. He appeared in the soap opera One Life to Live.

A colleague described Shue's enjoyment of behind-the scenes preparations. "[H]is theatrical interests extended to fiddling with make-up, disguises, and prosthetics. He used his kitchen as a laboratory to experiment with his favorite disguise material, foam latex. His kitchen-turned-lab was probably one of the reasons he spent most evenings eating out at an establishment called Ma Fisher's." In The Nerd, the title character creates an awkward self-introduction by showing up for a birthday party which he thinks is a Halloween party. Shue's scripted directions describe the display: He is dressed in a Hallowe'en costume which is really needlessly horrible, never mind the fact that it is several days too late — the Creature from the Black Lagoon, perhaps, after a tussle with the propeller of an ore-boat — glistening wounds on a scaly, green body, one eye semi-detached, and so on. The outfit must have cost him ninety dollars. What follows in the dialogue is an extended comedic piece about a costume competition. Similarly, the thrilling climax of The Foreigner relies upon Ku Klux Klan sheet costumes, and My Emperor's New Clothes requires elaborate and colorful costumes suitably designed to attract a young audience.

== Death ==
At the age of 39, Shue died in the crash of a Beech 99 commuter plane en route to Shenandoah Valley Regional Airport near Weyers Cave, Virginia; all fourteen people on the flight were killed, twelve passengers and two crew. Shue was traveling from New York to his family home in Virginia.

At the time, Shue was preparing for his first major performance on Broadway. He had originated the role of Reverend Crisparkle in Joseph Papp's The Mystery of Edwin Drood in the performance at Central Park's Delacorte Theater and was excited about the move. He was also writing a film adaptation of The Foreigner for Disney.

Among many other eulogies, author Thomas M. Disch said that Shue's death was "fate's cruelest trick on the theater since the murder of Joe Orton." Canadian actor Jeff Brooks said, "I knew him, and I saw him play Charlie [in the play The Foreigner] in New York. Then I played it in New York after him, although we're quite different as actors." Shue played the smaller role of Froggy, and Brooks had something to say about that, as well: "I know damn well he wrote Charlie for himself. As an actor, he was such a cut-up. When I saw him, he was wonderful. I remember thinking a couple of times that he's doing things that if he were the playwright sitting out here, he'd be saying, 'Oh, stop that. Cut that out.' But he was having so much fun inventively in the role."

His family established the Larry Shue Memorial Scholarship Fund at Glenbard West High School, where his mother had taught.

== Manuscript collection ==
Shue's papers are held at the University of Wisconsin–Milwaukee Archives Department and provide insight into his life and plays. The collection contains his diaries from 1958 (when Shue was 12) until his death, along with an extensive number of Shue's personal letters to and from colleagues and friends, his musical score for My Emperor's New Clothes, paintings and drawings. A family newsletter, written by Shue's father, provides details on the family's activities, careers, and travels, especially to the Far East. The collection contains an audio recording of the memorial service at the Todd Wehr Theater (Milwaukee) after Shue's death.
