= Jonathan Hadary =

American actor

Jonathan Hadary (born October 11, 1948) is an American actor.

== Early life and education ==
Born in Chicago, Illinois and raised in Bethesda, Maryland, Hadary arrived at Tufts University already an accomplished actor. He was cast in many shows at Tufts, both student and faculty directed. During his sophomore year, he became an understudy for the Boston company of You're a Good Man Charlie Brown. When the actor playing Charlie Brown was drafted for the Vietnam War, the actor playing Schroeder was moved to the Charlie Brown role, and Hadary took the part of Schroeder. He finished the Boston run of the show and then toured with it for some time.

== Career ==
Hadary made his New York City stage debut in the 1976 Playwrights Horizons staging of Albert Innaurato's Gemini. Critical acclaim for the off-Broadway production resulted in it transferring to PAF Playhouse and then to Circle Repertory Company, and finally to Broadway, where it ran for 1819 performances. Hadary worked off-Broadway again on the 1979 Howard Ashman and Alan Menken musical adaptation of Kurt Vonnegut's God Bless You, Mr. Rosewater, Ted Tally's 1980 play Coming Attractions, and the 1981 Tom Lehrer revue Tomfoolery. The following year he returned to Broadway to replace Harvey Fierstein in Torch Song Trilogy.

A member of the acting company at Circle Repertory Company, Hadary won an Obie Award for his performance in the 1985 William M. Hoffman play As Is at Circle Rep, and again, the play moved to Broadway, where it was nominated for three Tony Awards and won the Drama Desk Award for Best Play. In 1989, he co-starred opposite Tyne Daly in Gypsy, which earned him Tony Award and Drama Desk Award nominations. Hadary also played James Garfield assassin Charles Guiteau in the original off-Broadway production of Stephen Sondheim and John Weidman's musical Assassins.

In 1993, he played Nathan Detroit in the Broadway revival of Guys and Dolls. Hadary played the role of Roy Cohn in the national touring production of Millennium Approaches, the first part of Tony Kushner's theatrical epic Angels in America in 1994-95. He also appeared in the 2006 revival of Awake and Sing!, for which he shared the Drama Desk Award for Outstanding Ensemble Performance. He also portrayed King Arthur in the Broadway production of Monty Python's Spamalot. In 2019 he played tribune Sicinius in The Public Theater's production of Coriolanus, and The Public's production of an updated version of A Bright Room Called Day by Tony Kushner.

Hadary's feature film credits include A Time to Kill, Private Parts, and Intolerable Cruelty. On television he has appeared in Miami Vice, Party of Five, Law & Order, Law & Order: Criminal Intent, Hope and Faith, Sex and the City, Louie, Veep, The Heart, She Holler, and Russian Doll.

== Filmography ==
=== Film ===
Year	Title	Role	Notes
1994	The New Age	Paul Hartmann	
1994	The Swan Princess	Speed (singing voice)	
1996	A Time to Kill	Norman Reinfield	
1997	Private Parts	Griff	
1997	A Simple Wish	Lord Richard	
1998	Montana	St. John	
2000	Bait	Cafe Owner	
2001	Love the Hard Way	Boris	
2003	Intolerable Cruelty	Heinz, the Baron Krauss von Espy	
2006	Falling for Grace	Max	
2011	Margaret	Deutsch	
2015	Larry Kramer in Love and Anger	Ned Weeks	
2022	The Fabelmans	Sammy's Grandfather	Scenes deleted

=== Television ===
Year	Title	Role	Notes
1983	Braingames		Episode: "Pilot"
1986	As Is	Saul	Television film
1988	Miami Vice	Hank Frazier	Episode: "Vote of Confidence"
1991	Law & Order	Alex Petrovich	Episode: "The Serpent's Tooth"
1996	Swift Justice	Carl Jurgens	Episode: "Bad Medicine"
1996	Party of Five	Pete Terry	Episode: "Christmas"
2001	100 Centre Street	Barrey Krause	Episode: "Let's Make a Night of It"
2002	Law & Order: Criminal Intent	Hall Richmond	Episode: "The Insider"
2003	Hope & Faith	Tom	Episode: "Anger Management"
2004	Sex and the City	Vincent	Episode: "Out of the Frying Pan"
2011–2014	The Heart, She Holler	Hoss	26 episodes
2015	Louie	Joseph the Guru	Episode: "Pot Luck"
2016	Horace and Pete	Bearded Man	Episode #1.1
2016	Incident at Vichy	Old Jew	Television film
2017	At Home with Amy Sedaris	Sully	Episode: "Nature"
2017–2019	Veep	Sherman Tanz	7 episodes
2019	Russian Doll	Rabbi	Episode: "A Warm Body"
2021–2022	Girls5eva	Larry Plumb	8 episodes

=== Theatre ===
Year	Title	Role	Notes
1968-69	You're a Good Man, Charlie Brown	Schroeder	US Tour
1976	Gemini	Herschel Weinberger	Off-Broadway
1977	Gemini	Herschel Weinberger	Broadway
1979	God Bless You, Mr. Rosewater	Norman	Off-Broadway
1985-86	As Is	Saul	Broadway
1987	1776	John Adams	US Tour
1988	Wenceslas Square	Vince Corey	Off-Broadway
1989-90	Gypsy	Herbie	Broadway & US Tour
1990-91	Assassins	Charles Guiteau	Off-Broadway
1993-94	Guys and Dolls	Nathan Detroit	Broadway
1994-96	Angels in America	Roy Cohn	US Tour
2000	The Winter's Tale	Antigonus	Off-Broadway
2000	The Best Man	Sheldon Marcus	Broadway
2002	The Little Foxes	Oscar	Shakespeare Theatre Company
2004	The Matchmaker	Horace	Ford's Theatre
2005	All Shook Up	Jim Haller	Broadway
2006	Awake and Sing!	Myron	Broadway
2006-08	Spamalot	King Arthur	Broadway
2008	Show Boat	Captain Andy Hawks	Concert
2008-09	Spamalot	King Arthur	US Tour
2012-13	Golden Boy	Mr. Carp	Broadway
2013	The Comedy of Errors	Egeon / Dr. Pinch	Off-Broadway
2014-15	Fiddler on the Roof	Tevye	Arena Stage
2015	Incident at Vichy	Old Jew	Off-Broadway
2019	Coriolanus	Sicinius Velutus	Off-Broadway
2019	A Bright Room Called Day	Xillah	Off-Broadway
2022	Epiphany	Ames	Lincoln Center Theatre, Off-Broadway
2024	Uncle Vanya	Waffles	Broadway
