= Bare Knuckles =

1977 film by Don Edmonds

- Directed by: Don Edmonds
- Written by: Don Edmonds
- Produced by: Don Edmonds
- Starring: Robert Viharo; Sherry Jackson; Gloria Hendry; John Daniels
- Music by: Vic Caesar
- Distributed by: MGM
- Release date: September 1977
- Running time: 90 minutes
- Language: English
- Budget: $50,000

Bare Knuckles is a 1977 blaxploitation film, starring Robert Viharo, Sherry Jackson and Gloria Hendry. The film was written and directed by Don Edmonds.

== Plot ==
L.A. bounty hunter, Zachary Kane, is on the hunt for a masked serial killer on the loose.

== Production ==
Director Edmonds said he didn't get any permits for the movie, it was made for $25,000 with another $25,000 spent for goods and services.

== Legacy ==
It is one of the films that have inspired Quentin Tarantino, and it was selected by Tarantino himself to be shown at his Los Angeles Grindhouse Festival in 2007. In May 2008, it was being shown by Robert Viharo's son, Will, as part of his long-running Thrillville theater program.

Hip-hop duo Gangrene sampled the film's opening theme for the song "Breathing Down Yo Neck", featuring rapper MED, on their debut album Gutter Water.

== Cast ==
- Robert Viharo as Zachary Kane
- Sherry Jackson as Jennifer Randall
- Michael Heit as Richard Devlin
- Gloria Hendry as Barbara Darrow
- John Daniels as Black
- Karen Kondazian as Pamela Devlin
- Essex Smith as Efrom
- Richard Kennedy as Police Captain
- Patrick M. Wright as Max Baumer
- Jace as "Kido"
- Kyôko Fuji as Oriental Girl
- Valerie Rae Clark as Massage Girl
- John Dewey Carter as Deke
- James Freedman as Risso
- Amber Hunt as Rita
