= The Man in the Family =

- Genre: Sitcom
- Created by: Ed. Weinberger; Gina Wendkos
- Starring: Ray Sharkey; Anne De Salvo; Julie Bovasso; Don Stark; Leah Remini; Louis Guess; Billy L. Sullivan
- Country of origin: United States
- Original language: English
- No. of seasons: 1
- No. of episodes: 7 (list of episodes)

Production
- Camera setup: Multi-camera
- Running time: 30 minutes
- Production company: Columbia Pictures Television

Original release
- Network: ABC
- Release: June 19 – July 31, 1991

The Man in the Family is an American sitcom television series that aired on ABC from June 19 until July 31, 1991.

== Premise ==
The black sheep of the family takes over the family-owned grocery store in Brooklyn following his father's death.

== Cast ==
- Ray Sharkey as Sal Bovasso
- Anne De Salvo as Annie Bovasso
- Julie Bovasso as Angie Bovasso
- Don Stark as Cha Cha
- Leah Remini as Tina Bovasso
- Louis Guess as Uncle Bennie
- Billy L. Sullivan as Robbie

== Episodes ==
No.	Title	Directed by	Written by	Original release date
1	"Honor Bound"	Unknown	Ed. Weinberger and Gina Wendkos (story)	June 19, 1991
Sal agrees to a business proposition from his shady buddy.
2	"Once Bitten..."	John Rich	Ron Clark	June 26, 1991
Sal confronts the woman he left at the altar.
3	"Sal Falls in Love"	John Rich	Alan Daniels	July 3, 1991
Sal falls in love with a seemingly-perfect woman.
4	"Uncle Sal"	John Rich	Ron Wullner	July 10, 1991
Sal pretends Robby is his son to impress a woman.
5	"Date with a Don"	John Rich	Oliver Goldstick and Philip Rosenthal	July 17, 1991
Annie gets a proposal she can't refuse from the neighborhood don.
6	"Real News"	John Rich	Ron Clark and Alan Daniels	July 24, 1991
The Bavassos re-enact a store burglary for a reality-TV show.
7	"My Pal Joey"	John Rich	Ron Clark and Alex Daniels	July 31, 1991
Sal doesn't trust his friend Joey to go out with Tina.
