= Happy Birthday, Gemini =

- Movie poster artwork by Jack Davis (one of the founders of Mad Magazine)
- Directed by: Richard Benner
- Screenplay by: Richard Benner
- Based on: Gemini by Albert Innaurato
- Produced by: Rupert Hitzig
- Starring: Madeline Kahn; Rita Moreno; Robert Viharo; Alan Rosenberg; Sarah Holcomb; David Marshall Grant; Timothy Jenkins
- Cinematography: James B. Kelly
- Edited by: Stephan Fanfara; Horense Beveridge
- Music by: Rich Look; Cathy Chamberlain
- Distributed by: United Artists
- Release date: May 2, 1980
- Running time: 107 minutes
- Country: United States
- Language: English
- Budget: $2,000,000

Happy Birthday, Gemini is a 1980 American comedy-drama film written and directed by Richard Benner. It is based on Albert Innaurato's long running play Gemini. The film stars Madeline Kahn, Rita Moreno, Robert Viharo, Alan Rosenberg, Sarah Holcomb, David Marshall Grant and Timothy Jenkins.

The film is centered around the 21st birthday celebration of Francis, his visiting friends from Harvard, his father Nick, and Francis's zany neighbors. The film received mostly negative reviews, and was called a "flop" at the box-office.

== Plot ==
The film is set in a blue-collar neighborhood in South Philadelphia in the summer of 1973, where Harvard student Francis is home for the summer. Judith and her brother Randy, who are hitchhiking to California, stop off in South Philly to pay a surprise visit to Francis to help celebrate his 21st birthday. They are surprised that Francis does not appear very happy that they have shown up unannounced.

The real reason for Francis's queasiness is not because he is embarrassed about his friends seeing where he lives, or his flamboyant neighbors, but that Judith, with whom he has slept with before, wants him back, however, Francis is gay and likes Randy, her brother.

In attendance are his divorced father Nick, who is a butcher; Lucille who works for Nick; Bunny and her son Herschel, the next door neighbors. All are dysfunctional to varying degrees, Bunny dresses like a floozy and is well liked, even though she does not like herself that much, her son Herschel is an overweight and asthmatic nerd who is fascinated with public transportation systems. Lucille was raised a Catholic, so she insists that Nick leave her house early in the morning so no one in the neighborhood will see him, and suspect she is committing a sin.

In the end, Francis comes out to his father, friends, and neighbors who accept him for who he is.

== Cast ==
- Madeline Kahn as Bunny
- Rita Moreno as Lucille
- Robert Viharo as Nick
- Alan Rosenberg as Francis
- Sarah Holcomb as Judith
- David Marshall Grant as Randy
- Timothy Jenkins as Herschel
- David Mcllwraith as Sam
- Maura Swanson as Mary
- Robert Easley as Judge
- John W. Kennedy as Mr. O'Donnell
- Michael Donaghue as Father McBride
- Alberto De Rosa as Dominique
- Michael Holton as Court clerk
- A. Frank Ruffo as Jerry
- Dwayne McLean as Eddie

== Background and production ==
Benner said he was convinced to go see the play by his agent, and it became clear to him after watching the play, that this was the nearest thing to a modern Chekhov that he had seen: "there are seven major characters but very little plot, essentially, you watch seven people evolve emotionally." Benner bought the screen rights from Innaurato for $85,000. The contract was negotiated when the play's run at the Little Theater was winding down, and shortly before Innaurato had invested "his last $20,000" to make a 30-second television commercial for the play that aired in the New York area. Innaurato said it was "a typical Hollywood deal, and the art in Hollywood is The Deal, not The Movie," in which he got shafted.

Benner wrote the screenplay without any input from Innaurato. Benner said there was no stipulation in the contract that he needed Innaurato's approval, but he felt like there was an "ethical one", and the two of them became "great friends." Benner further stated that he did not "think the play was well-served on stage." Innaurato said he saw the movie, but declined to make a comment about it.

The movie began shooting in Toronto on June 20, 1979, and was supposed to be finished by August 3. A week later they were still filming and so far over their initial budget for the film, that they had given up the pretense of calling it a "little over" or "slightly over." According to John Quill, the film's production manager, Jim Kelly, the original director of photography, was replaced by Richard C. Brooks in June, due to Kelly being sick. According to other members of the crew, Kelly was fired, "as a scapegoat or because he actually was responsible for the slow pace." (Note: Credits at the beginning of the theatrical version of the movie show James B. Kelly, C.S.C. as the director of photography.) Quill himself had replaced Barbara Laffey, the original production manager, who was "fired as a result of personality conflicts."

Filming locations in Toronto included Kensington Market, several backyards on Beverley Street, and a trolley graveyard and a banquet hall on Dufferin Street. Before James Cameron established himself as a successful filmmaker, he served as a set dresser's assistant on the film. The expression "Happy Birthday" was added to the film's title because market research showed the single–word title "Gemini", did not receive a positive response from potential moviegoers, and with the addition of the phrase, it served as a reference to the birthday celebration of Francis.

The movie's gay theme was not mentioned in film posters or other promotional material. Benner added a scene in the film that was not in the original play, where Nick accepts Francis coming out. In the stage play the ending left the impression that Francis would go off with Judith. According to Benner, the additional scene was endorsed by Innaurato. Benner went on to say that gay people who work in the film industry have an obligation to create gay characters and themes that are shown in a positive way. He also stated that people are drawn to what's genuine and sincere, and "people who underestimate the intelligence of the audience are always in trouble", as William Friedkin's film Cruising illustrates.

While they were filming on location in Toronto, Madeline Kahn started dating her co-star David Marshall Grant: "He was the love of her life up to that point and for at least several years." Grant recalls that period:

I don't think I turned out to be who she thought I was, and she didn't turn out to be who I thought she was; the heterosexual and the formidable star. We were neither of those things.

In 1984, Grant came out to her, and she offered advice on how to navigate his future career in Hollywood. Grant says he was "tormented", he wanted to be an actor and was concerned about how his coming out would affect his career. Kahn stayed in touch with him, and even introduced him to people who might advance his career, both as an actor and writer.

== Critical analysis and reception ==
=== Analysis ===
Author David Considine cites the film as a "quantum leap forward in Hollywood's treatment of adolescent homosexuality, since images of queer youth remained rare in American cinema at the time." Considine opined that Nick's reaction to Francis's revelation that he is gay is not what we may have expected in this scene where Nick tells Francis:

"it doesn't matter; it doesn't matter what you are and what you aren't, or what you think you might be. No matter what, I love you, I got to, you're the best thing I've ever done, you know.

Considine argues that scene had a significant impact on American cinema, as It drew a direct line between sexuality and family life. He further states that instead of the father condemning his son, or wishing he was a "chip off the old block", his reaction paved the way for his son to become an adult on his own terms. He also remarked the film not only saved Francis's life, it gave him the hope of a happy future, and the role of his father "in this was crucial." Brenner commented that "without his father, the son would probably have killed himself." Considine concludes that "the survival of the son and his father's support represented a startling new attitude in Hollywood's response to adolescent homosexuality."

=== Reception ===
Leonard Maltin awarded the film two stars, stating it is a "disappointing adaptation of Innaurato's Broadway play; colorful stage characters are lost on film." Maida Tilchen of Gay Community News wrote "the movie looks like a filmed stage play, with few sets, a lot of overacting, and action entirely in the dialogue." However, Tilchen did note that the film has a happy ending "where an average looking gay guy comes out and finds acceptance from his family and friends."

Author William Madison opined that "translated to the big screen without input from the playwright ... it lost its balance; the zanier supporting characters overpower the Harvard students; there's no firm directorial hand to bind together the character's disparate traits or the movie's seemingly contradictory motives." Canadian film critic Thomas Waugh said the film "managed a modicum of gay sensibility despite its U.S. studio financing."

Film critic Vincent Canby said "if the actors aren't overstressing their lines, the camera is picking up lighting effects that scream the mood we're supposed to be feeling; when all else fails, the soundtrack music takes over like a noisy tour guide who won't shut up — the result is a disaster." Critic Michael Lasky thought "if the film does not work totally it is because director Benner hasn't left well enough alone; the action does not flow — its feel, tampered with and slowed down." He concluded that although the film is "thoughtful and funny", it is also "saddled with uninspiring photography, poor editing, and poor pacing."

Film critic Gerald Pratley said the film "makes a somewhat flat and colourless transfer to the screen." Critic James Robert Parish called the film a "flop". He further opined that "in the effort to drag box–office appeal into the movie, comedienne Madeline Kahn's role was enlarged into a super–caricature at the expense of the rest of the characters ... it disappeared quickly from the box–office." Critic Jay Scott wrote that "with so many credits, it's an ironic shame that the movie may be remembered for its biggest debit, for the outrageous Madeline Kahn's incendiary one-woman sideshow."

== See also ==
- Cinema of the United States
- American comedy films
- List of American films of 1980
- List of LGBTQ-related films of 1980
