= The Amati Girls =

2001 film by Anne De Salvo

- Film poster
- Directed by: Anne De Salvo
- Written by: Anne De Salvo
- Produced by: James Alex; Melanie Backer; Steven Johnson; Michael I. Levy; Matthew Rhodes; Henry M. Shea Jr.; Howard Kazanjian
- Starring: Mercedes Ruehl; Paul Sorvino; Cloris Leachman; Lee Grant; Mark Harmon; Sean Young; Dinah Manoff; Jamey Sheridan
- Cinematography: Frank Byers
- Edited by: David L. Bertman; Carroll Timothy O'Meara
- Music by: Conrad Pope
- Production companies: Fox Family Channel; Heritage Group
- Distributed by: Providence Entertainment
- Release date: January 19, 2001
- Running time: 91 minutes
- Country: United States
- Language: English
- Budget: $3 million
- Box office: $49,136

The Amati Girls is a 2001 American drama film written and directed by Anne De Salvo. It stars Cloris Leachman, Mercedes Ruehl, Dinah Manoff, Sean Young, Lily Knight, Lee Grant, and Edith Fields.

== Plot ==
An Italian American family of four sisters reside in Philadelphia. After their father's death, in trying to convince their mother that her life is still worth living, each sister grapples with her own ideas on love, faith, and ultimately, the meaning of life.

== Cast ==
- Cloris Leachman as Dolly Amati
- Mercedes Ruehl as Grace Amati
- Dinah Manoff as Denise Amati
- Sean Young as Christine Amati
- Lily Knight as Dolores Amati
- Lee Grant as Aunt Splendora
- Edith Fields as Aunt Loretta
- Cassie Cole as Carla
- Marissa Leigh as Laura
- Sam McMurray as Brian
- Joe Greco as Uncle Frankie
- Matt Winston as Johnny Barlotta
- Mary Hershberger as Kevin
- Anne De Salvo as Cathy
- Sal Viscuso as Father Dedice
- Anna Berger as Stella
- John Capodice as Danny
- Robert Picardo as Grace's Doctor
- Frederic Tucker as Stage Manager (credited as Fred Tucker)
- Carol Ann Susi as Ticket Seller
- Jay Acovone as Mr. Moltianni
- Don Marino as Sam
- Kivi Rogers as Mike
- Asher Gold as Peter
- Mark Harmon as Lawrence
- Kyle Sabihy as Joey
- Jessica Sara as Nancy
- Jamey Sheridan as Paul
- Paul Sorvino as Joe
- Niki Harris as Flight Attendant
- Maria Cina as Rockie's Girl
- Larrisa Joy as Italian Class Student
- Doug Spinuzza as Armand
- Michelle Joyner as Moviegoer
- Anthony Pontrello as Nick, The Bartender

=== Cameo/uncredited cast ===
- Sean Huze as Concert Goer

== Reception ==
The Amati Girls holds a 46% approval rating on Rotten Tomatoes based on 13 reviews, with an average score of 4.4/10. Metacritic reports a score of 29 out of 100 based on 17 critics, indicating "generally unfavorable reviews".
