= Walk Proud =

- Theatrical release poster
- Directed by: Robert L. Collins
- Written by: Evan Hunter
- Produced by: Lawrence Turman
- Starring: Robby Benson; Sarah Holcomb
- Cinematography: Bobby Byrne
- Edited by: Douglas Stewart
- Music by: Robby Benson; Don Peake
- Production company: Universal Pictures
- Distributed by: Universal Pictures
- Release date: June 15, 1979
- Running time: 102 minutes
- Country: United States
- Language: English
- Budget: $2.4 million
- Box office: $1.7 million

Walk Proud is a 1979 hood drama film directed by Robert L. Collins and written by Evan Hunter and starring Robby Benson, Sarah Holcomb, Henry Darrow, Pepe Serna, Trinidad Silva and Ji-Tu Cumbuka. It was released on June 15, 1979, by Universal Pictures.

== Premise ==
Emilio Mendez is a 17-year-old Chicano man in California comes to realize that the gang life is not what he really wants but doesn't know how to get out.

Robby Benson plays a young gang member in Los Angeles who begins to question himself when Mendez meets and starts to fall for a White girl who encourages him to try and leave. Emilio, with great pride in his Native Mexican heritage, suffers a further identity crisis upon meeting his father, a European-American who got his Brown mother pregnant when she was just 16.

== Cast ==
- Robby Benson as Emilio Mendez
- Sarah Holcomb as Sarah Lassiter
- Henry Darrow as Mike Serrano
- Pepe Serna as Cesar
- Trinidad Silva as Dagger
- Ji-Tu Cumbuka as Sgt. Gannett
- Lawrence Pressman as Henry Lassiter
- Domingo Ambriz as Cowboy
- Brad Sullivan as Jerry Kelsey
- Irene DeBari as Mrs. Mendez
- Eloy Casados as Hugo
- Daniel Faraldo as El Tigre
- Tony Alvarenga as Paco
- Aesop Aquarian as Hippo
- Benjie Bancroft as Police Guard
- Gary Carlos Cervantes as Carlos
- Tim Culbertson as Police Guard
- Lee Fraser as Johnny
- Panchito Gómez as Manuel
- Joe Jacobs as Store Owner
- Bill Lopresto as Ice Cream Vendor
- Claudio Martínez as Vincente
- Rod Masterson as Policeman #2
- Patricia A. Morales as Church Singer
- Dennis O'Flaherty as Policeman #1
- Rose Portillo as Katie
- Luis Reyes as El Español
- Eduardo Ricard as Priest
- Ángel Salazar as Angel
- Judith Searle as Abigail Lassiter
- Tony Steinhart as Interrogation Officer
- Felipe Turich as Prayer Maker
- Jose Ramiro Salazar as an unidentified gang member

== See also ==
- List of hood films
