= A Bright Room Called Day =

1985 play written by Tony Kushner

A Bright Room Called Day is a play by American playwright Tony Kushner, author of Angels in America.

== Synopsis ==
The play is set in Germany in 1932 and 1933, and concerns a group of friends caught up in the events of the fall of the Weimar Republic and the rise to power of Adolf Hitler and the Nazi Party. The plot is centered on a woman named Agnes Eggling, a middle-aged actress, and all of the action takes place in her apartment. The action is occasionally interrupted by scenes featuring Zillah, a young woman in the 1980s living in Long Island who believes that Reagan is becoming too much like Hitler. In the version performed by the New York Shakespeare Festival, Zillah has moved to Berlin. Zillah has fled to Germany out of frustration and anger at the growing power of the Republican Party in America during the 1980s.

=== 2018 version ===
Kushner revised the script in 2018 to include a new character, Xillah, who only interacts with Zillah. As explained by the character in the 2019 Public Theater production, A Bright Room Called Day was a play he wrote 34 years ago that never worked until Donald Trump was elected and suddenly everyone wanted to produce it, so he decided to give it an update. Xillah serves as Kushner's own commentary on his play, occasionally cutting into the proceedings to comment on issues with the play and getting into arguments with his "failed theatrical device" Zillah on the content of the play. Throughout the play, the two characters frequently discuss Kushner's prior comparison of Hitler to Ronald Reagan with present-day Hitler comparisons to Donald Trump. Zillah spends much of the play asking Xillah to write a new ending where she can interact with Agnes instead of having her just write hate mail to Ronald Reagan, while Xillah insists it is naïve to think one can speak to the dead. The result has been characterized by Kushner and Oskar Eustis (who directed the original Eureka production and the Public Theater revival) as turning the play from a critique of the American right to a discussion on the role of art as social or political action.

== Production history ==
A Bright Room Called Day was first presented in a workshop production by Heat & Light Co., Inc., at Theatre 22 in New York City in April 1985, directed by Kushner himself.

The play premiered at the Eureka Theatre in San Francisco, California in October 1987, directed by Oskar Eustis.

In January 1991, it was produced at the Joseph Papp Public Theater by the New York Shakespeare Festival, where it was directed by Michael Greif.

The segments of the play set in the 1930s remained substantially the same throughout the various productions, but Zillah's interruptions changed drastically from version to version. Her scenes were the primary point of contention for critics of the show, some of whom took offense at her comparisons of Ronald Reagan to Adolf Hitler.

In 2009, A Bright Room Called Day was translated into French by Hillary Keegin and Pauline Le Diset. It was presented by I Girasoli at the Théatre de la Boutonnière, Paris, France in January 2010 under the title Bright Room.

In July to August 2014, the play got its first London revival at the Southwark Playhouse, directed by Sebastian Harcombe.

In February 2018 a revised version of the play, titled "A Bright Room Called Day (Revisited)", was performed at the University of Southern California School of Dramatic Arts. The revised version included the addition of the character Xillah, who also interrupts the play and comments on the modern parallels of the play in contrast to the parallels made to 1985. The production was directed by David Warshofsky.

Oskar Eustis helmed a revival of the play at the Public Theater in the fall of 2019, running from October 29 to December 22 after two extensions from an original end date of December 8. The production, using the revised version of the script, featured Nikki M. James as Agnes, Michael Urie as Gregor, Linda Emond as Annabella, Jonathan Hadary as Xillah, and Estelle Parsons as Die Älte, with Michael Esper as Vealtninc, Grace Gummer as Paulinka, Crystal Lucas-Perry as Zillah, Nadine Malouf as Rosa Malek, Mark Margolis as Gottfried Swetts, and Max Woertendyke as Emil Traum. Hayley Levitt of TheaterMania noted the revised script resembled a commentary on an old play rather than a revival of the play itself.

The first ever Canadian production premiered at the University of Alberta in 2017.

The Canadian premiere of the 2018 version--"A Bright Room Called Day, Revisited"—was performed at the University of Winnipeg in December 2025.

== Critics ==
- "Tony Kushner's A Bright Room Called Day...is unabashedly political, thought-provoking, a little scary, and frequently a good deal of theatrical fun. ...Bright Room is...an examination of Nazi Germany in an attempt to shed insight on our own time. It's brash, audacious, and, depending on your politics, anything from infuriatingly naive to intoxicatingly visionary. In its 1932-33 span, it tells of a group of Berlin artists and friends, with varying degrees of communist leanings, and of the changes in their lives as democracy falls and Adolph Hitler takes over." Sid Smith, Chicago Tribune
- "It's fun to see a show this engaged. This passionate and ready to talk. Wild, uneven, pugnacious, ragged, committed, smart, dumb, satirical, and utterly serious. Always dramatically and intellectually forceful. And most important, always passionately committed. More than a diatribe against Reagan or a falling-into-the-Nazi-abyss history play, A Bright Room Called Day is an assertion of the need for commitment." Anthony Adler, The Reader
