= Thrillville (theater event) =

Thrillville is the name of a monthly theater event in Oakland, California dedicated to showcasing B-movies, cult movies, science fiction films, and exploitation films. The event features a film (from one of those genres) combined with special guests and a live stage show, typically a musical or Burlesque act. Thrillville is hosted by Will "the Thrill" Viharo (son of B-movie actor Robert Viharo) and his wife, Monica "Tiki Goddess" Cortes.

In addition to one-time showings, regular themed events include "Shatfest: A Tribute to William Shatner," "Elvis D-Day," "Zombie-Rama" and "Horror Host Palooza." In addition movie trailers, short films, and theater concession advertisements have been shown before feature presentations.

== History ==
Beginning as a weekly Saturday night series in 1997 at the Parkway Speakeasy Theater in Oakland, California. In 1999 the series changed to Thursday evenings and has continued for eight years under the name "Thrillville."

== Live show ==
In addition to the main film, the event features special guests and a live stage show, typically a musical or Burlesque act.

Thrillville's guests over the years have included cult movie icon Ray Dennis Steckler, women from Russ Meyer films, Creature Features hosts Bob Wilkins and John Stanley, Yvonne "Batgirl" Craig, Gary Lockwood (from 2001: A Space Odyssey).

Musical and entertainment acts have included various Neo Burlesque acts and live music from the Phenomenauts, Kitten on the Keys, Pollo Del Mar, Apocalypso Now and many more.

== Touring Road Show ==
In addition to rotating between the two Speakeasy Theaters, Thrillville has occurred as a road show at locations that include:

- Caliente Tropics hotel (Palm Springs, California)
- the Fine Arts Cinema in Berkeley, California
- The Berkeley Art Museum and Pacific Film Archive at UC Berkeley

== Ocean's 11 Remake Protest ==
In December 2001, Thrillville protested the 2001 remake of the 1960 film Ocean's 11, calling the actors "impostors" and stating that the remake was "an insult to the (Rat Pack's) legacy." This protest involved a group picketing outside Oakland's Jack London Cinemas and was featured by various nationwide news sources.

== Featured movies ==
Thrillville resurrects both famous and obscure cult films for big screen revival in a Grindhouse type atmosphere with an old fashioned Ghost show format. Each Thrillville features a theme centered around a Cult, Exploitation, or other B-movie. Some randomly chosen film samples:

- Blood Feast (1963)
- The Girl Can't Help It (1956)
- Earth vs. the Flying Saucers (1956)
- Forbidden Planet (1956)
- Barbarella (1968)
- I Was a Teenage Werewolf (1957)
- Coffy (1973)
- Shanty Tramp (1967)
- The Vampire Lovers (1971)
- The Incredibly Strange Creatures Who Stopped Living and Became Mixed-Up Zombies (1964)
- Children Shouldn't Play with Dead Things (1971)
- Impulse (1975)
- Infra Man (1975)
- King Kong vs. Godzilla (1963)
- Viva Las Vegas (1964)
- Beach Blanket Bingo (1965)
- Monster of Piedras Blancas (1959)
- Night of the Bloody Apes (1969)
- Spider Baby (1965)
- The Astro-Zombies (1968)
- Dracula vs. Frankenstein (1971)
- Beast of the Yellow Night (1971)
- Beyond the Valley of the Dolls (1970)
- Hercules in the Haunted World (1961)
- Jason and the Argonauts (1963)
- White Heat (1949)
- Sweet Smell of Success (1957)
- Batman (1966)
- Rat Pfink a Boo Boo (1965)
- Queen of Outer Space (1958)
- Night of the Living Dead (1968)
- Creature from the Black Lagoon (1954)
- Jailhouse Rock (1957)
- The Silencers (1966)
- Goldfinger (1964)
