= The Foreigner (play) =

1984 two-act comedy by Larry Shue

Actors perform The Foreigner at Blue Ridge Community Theater in rural Georgia, where the show takes place

The Foreigner is a 1984 two-act comedy by American playwright Larry Shue. The play has become a staple of professional and amateur theatre. The Foreigner has earned two Obie Awards and two Outer Critics Circle Awards as Best New American Play and Best Off-Broadway Production.

== Plot ==
In a resort-style fishing lodge in rural Georgia, the plot revolves around the visit one weekend of two guests, Englishmen Charlie Baker and Staff Sergeant Froggy LeSueur, who is an explosives engineering instructor. Naturally shy, Charlie is also depressed because his beloved wife may be dying. He tells Froggy he simply cannot speak with strangers just now.

To help his friend, Froggy tells Betty Meeks, who owns the lodge, that Charlie is the native of an exotic country who does not understand a word of English. Betty, who has never traveled, is delighted to cater for a stranger who is "as foreign as the day is long." At first, Charlie is appalled by Froggy's fabrication and protests that he can't pretend. At once, though, Charlie overhears a private and emotional conversation (Catherine discovers she is pregnant), and decides he had better perpetuate the ruse.

Before long, Charlie finds himself privy to assorted secrets and scandals freely discussed in front of him by the other visitors. These include spoiled but introspective heiress and Southern belle Catherine Simms, and the man to whom she is reluctantly engaged, the Reverend David Lee, a seemingly good-natured minister. Her younger brother, Ellard, a slow-witted youth, tries to "teach" Charlie how to speak English. Owen Musser, the xenophobic county property inspector, plans to oust Betty and convert the lodge into a meeting place for the Ku Klux Klan.

When Charlie overhears David and Owen plotting the takeover by declaring the lodge buildings condemned, he spends the weekend pretending to learn a great deal of English very rapidly under the tutelage of Ellard. (He also pretends to speak his "native" language, with much repetition of the phrase "blasny, blasny" and other words that sound vaguely Eastern-European.) Owen finds Charlie alone and threatens him, saying that when the Klan is in power, they will kill all the foreigners. Charlie falls back on the science fiction he has spent his life studying and frightens Owen into running away, shouting that he will bring the Klan to the house that night. David tells them not to call the police and goes in pursuit of Owen.

Catherine leaves a message for Froggy, begging for his help, but she, Ellard, and Betty now need the increasingly confident Charlie to rescue them from this dangerous situation. With the help of the trap-door to the cellar, Charlie appears to disintegrate a Klansman, and the rest run away in terror. David is unmasked, confesses all to Catherine (he was marrying her for her money), but exclaims that he can start again from scratch as long as he has the weapons in the van. Froggy appears in the doorway, arms his detonator and blows up the van. With the threat vanquished, the protagonists celebrate. Froggy takes Charlie aside to give him a telegram, saying that perhaps Charlie can remain at the lodge a little longer. Betty expects that he has received news of his wife's death. Froggy explains, "No. It was from 'is wife. No. She recovered completely. Ran off with a proctologist." Catherine urges Charlie to stay with them, and he agrees.

== Characters ==
- Charlie Baker: a meek proofreader for a science fiction magazine; he has a merrily adulterous wife who disdains him, yet whom he misses. Depressed and shy, Charlie comes out of his shell as he finds himself the center of attention, and ultimately possessed of such inner resources as wit and courage.
- S/Sgt. "Froggy" LeSueur: a cheerful British Army man who travels to teach the use of his specially designed explosives detonator package. He brings Betty souvenirs, and flirts with her at every opportunity.
- Betty Meeks: an elderly widow who owns a resort lodge and mothers her guests. Good-natured, ignorant of the wider world, she often wishes she'd had the chance to travel and see "real foreigners" as Froggy gets to do.
- Catherine Simms: a pretty heiress going through an emotional time. A kindly caretaker for Ellard, she soon comes to rely upon Charlie for his quiet patience as a confidant.
- Ellard Simms: Catherine's dim-witted brother, heir to half the family money if Catherine decides he is "smart enough to handle it.” He is trusting and gentle, but no one gives him the time of day until Charlie comes into the picture.
- Rev. David Marshall Lee: a polite, good-looking white Christian man, engaged to Catherine and, "it would appear, a good young man to have on our side.” His charming demeanor dims for the audience when he is alone with Charlie, as he begins to show his true colors.
- Owen Musser: a superstitious, dangerous white supremacist who lives in town.

== Performance history ==
Following its premiere at Milwaukee Repertory Theater, the play opened off-Broadway on November 1, 1984 at New York City's Astor Place Theatre where it ran for 686 performances. It was directed by Jerry Zaks. The opening night cast included Shue (as Froggy), Anthony Heald (Charlie), Patricia Kalember (Catherine), Robert Schenkkan (David), and Sudie Bond (Betty). The play eventually won two Obie Awards and two Outer Critics Circle Awards, including Best New American Play and Best Off-Broadway Production. Larry Shue died in a plane crash the following year, not living to see the continued popularity of The Foreigner.

November 14–17, 1990, the Georgia College Department of Music and Drama performed 5 Shows in Russell Auditorium, on the campus of Georgia College (Now Georgia College and State University) in Milledgeville Georgia, to sold out audiences.

On November 7, 2004, a Roundabout Theater Company revival opened for a ten-week run at the off-Broadway Laura Pels Theater. It was directed by Scott Schwartz and starred Matthew Broderick as Charlie, Frances Sternhagen as Betty, Mary Catherine Garrison as Catherine, and Neal Huff as Reverend David Marshall Lee.

In August 2012, the American Stage Theatre Company of Saint Petersburg, Florida, had a weeks-long run with a cast including Chris Crawford as Charlie, Natalie Symons as Catherine, Elizabeth Dimon as Betty, Gavin Hawk as the Reverend, Greyson Lewis as Ellard, and Dan Matisa as Owen. Matt Chirioni directed the production with Tom Hansen as set designer.

From September 20 to October 12, 2013, it was shown in Vancouver at the Pacific Theatre.

In 2018, Fullerton Union High School in Fullerton, California, performed the play. The show was met with pushback from the district, but was felt to be something that people needed to see, after hate crimes by white supremacists had upset the city. The theater critic wrote, "The Foreigner, a fun and funny farce from the 1980s, just happens to have renewed relevance at the moment." The production was given First Place in Southern California by the California Educational Theatre Association as well as Best Play by the Orange County Chapter of The Cappies.

Roosevelt High School attempted to perform the play in 2019, but it was deemed culturally insensitive by the Sioux Falls School District due to high school students dressed in Ku Klux Klan garb.

A production of The Foreigner by the theatre department of Washington College was scheduled to run from November 8–9, 2019, but it was cancelled amid concerns that "the play’s depictions of Ku Klux Klan villains 'in white hoods and robes' were 'deeply upsetting to some.'"

From October 31–November 2, 2019, Coeur d'Alene Charter Academy in Idaho did four performances of The Foreigner.

== Critical response ==
Frank Rich saw the opening night performance at the Astor in New York. He praised the performance of Anthony Heald as Charlie and wrote that the play "desperately wants to provide some silly fun," but judged that "its convoluted shenanigans hardly seem worth the effort."

Reviewing the Roundabout Theatre Company performance for The Hartford Courant, Malcolm Johnson wrote,

Watching Matthew Broderick, initially almost wordless in the title role of Larry Shue's "The Foreigner," provides a delightful lesson in the art of listening. But Broderick also excels in wacky mime, in nutty acrobatics, in nonsense storytelling and in modest charm as his Charlie Baker undergoes a growing self-realization. ... Being the deadpan witness to secrets drives Shue's unlikely but often very funny play, which opened off-Broadway in 1984, only a year before the playwright's death in the crash of a small plane. Broderick takes full advantage of every absurd turn of events in Charlie's strange interlude... Carried away by his own whimsical imagination, Charlie performs an intricate and extended act of imitative ritual with Kevin Cahoon's goofy, gangling Ellard, recalling the mirror game played out between Groucho and Harpo in Duck Soup. Here, with a juice cup atop his head, Broderick follows Cahoon through an increasingly ridiculous series of silent poses and silly dances, warming to the liberating fun of finding a soul mate. ... At its silly, romantic heart, The Foreigner traces the opening up of a repressed sad sack, who even manages to find true love in Mary Catherine Garrison's bitter, regretful Catherine.

Ben Brantley, reviewing the same performance for The New York Times, described it as a "deliberately doltish comedy of improbabilities." Brantley praised the star: "Mr. Broderick floats toward that rarefied ether where slapstick and ballet blur. This actor's delight in cutting loose infectiously mirrors his character's liberation from his stodgy self." However, he thought the pacing too slow and the script "as patronizing to its Southern characters as they initially are to Charlie."

Philip Brandes reviewed a 1993 production of the play, starring Steve Vinovich, Julianna McCarthy, Matthew Walker and Scott Jaeck, for the Los Angeles Times.

One reason Larry Shue's "The Foreigner" is so frequently performed is because it's one of the few modern comedies that remains true to human nature despite its absurd excesses. Another reason is that it's outrageously funny. If those aren't grounds enough to enjoy an evening at the theater, toss in the incentive of Tom Alderman's handsomely staged Pasadena Playhouse production at the Lobero Theatre as a first-rate cast guides us sure-footedly through Shue's exploration of the comic possibilities suggested by an initial false impression.

Marty Clear, writing for the Tampa Bay Times about a 2012 production, said,

Playwrights seldom create farce these days, and theater companies seldom produce it. One reason, no doubt, is the high risk-reward ratio. Farce is frothy entertainment, but by definition it's dense and complicated. If the writing isn't scrupulously clever the plots can become muddled, and if the performances aren't precise the humor can cross the line from joyful silliness into abject stupidity. Fortunately, though, everything's right with Larry Shue's The Foreigner and its hilarious staging at American Stage.

Chicago Theater Beat called the play "a charming comedy about the magic of kindness", and DC Theater Scene described a performance by the Bay Theatre in Annapolis, Maryland, as "a hit! ... culminating in a hilarious climax and heart-warming ending."

== Trivia ==
- Charlie speaks the phrase Klaatu barada nikto twice in the play and uses Gort, the robot's name, referring to the famous line in the classic film The Day the Earth Stood Still (1951) and his own self-stated job as an editor of science fiction.
