= Thrill-Ville USA =

Former amusement park in Turner, Oregon, United States

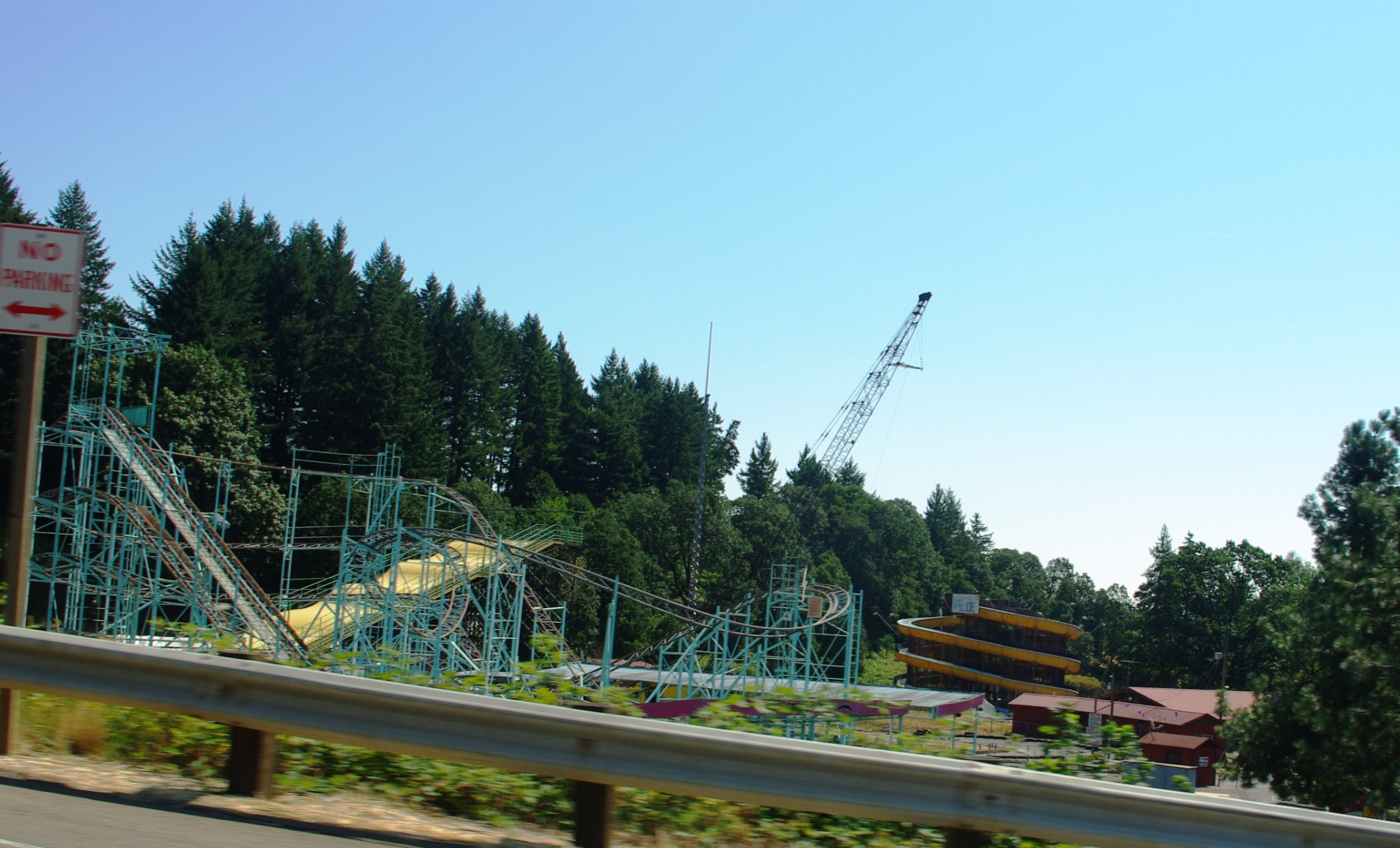
- Park grounds in 2009
- Interactive map of Thrill-Ville USA
- Location: 8372 Enchanted Way SE, Turner, Oregon, U.S.
- Coordinates: 44°49′59.32″N 123°00′31.68″W
- Opened: 1970s
- Closed: 2007
- Operating season: June through Labor Day

Attractions
- Roller coasters: 2
- Water rides: 2

Thrill-Ville USA was an amusement park in Turner, Oregon, United States. The park was located next to the Enchanted Forest south of Salem on Interstate 5. Opened in the 1970s, the park grew to more than 20 rides before closing in 2007. Rides included roller coasters, go-karts, classic carnival rides (such as Octopus, Rock-O-Plane, Tilt-A-Whirl, Paratrooper, and many more) a 55-foot (17 m) double water slide, and a regular slide. The park also had an area called "Thrill-Zone" which included a Sky Coaster, Big Sling ride, SCAD Freefall Tower, and Turbo Force. De-construction of the park's major roller coaster, the "Ripper" started in spring 2010.

== History ==
In the early 1970s what later became Thrill-Ville USA opened as a go-cart track. The Vettrus family added the go-carts as a children's amusement feature next to the family's recreational vehicle (RV) park. The Vettrus brothers later owned and operated the amusement park that grew to more than 20 different rides. In 1984, the park added a 55-foot-tall (17 m) waterslide.

The park was renamed as Thrill-Ville USA in the early 1990s. Marion County told the operators in the early 1990s that the park's land needed to be rezoned or face possible closure. In 1995, Thrill-Ville was allowed to stay open after meeting a variety of conditions set by the county including noise abatement and establishing a parking plan. By 1999, the park had an annual attendance of 200,000 people. In May 2008, the park announced that due to higher insurance costs and a slowing economy that the park would not open for its usual season of Memorial Day to Labor Day in 2008. The park also said that Thrill-Ville USA may not ever re-open. Thrill-Ville has since been completely demolished. Hope Valley Resort, a tiny home community, was built on the former site.

== Attractions ==
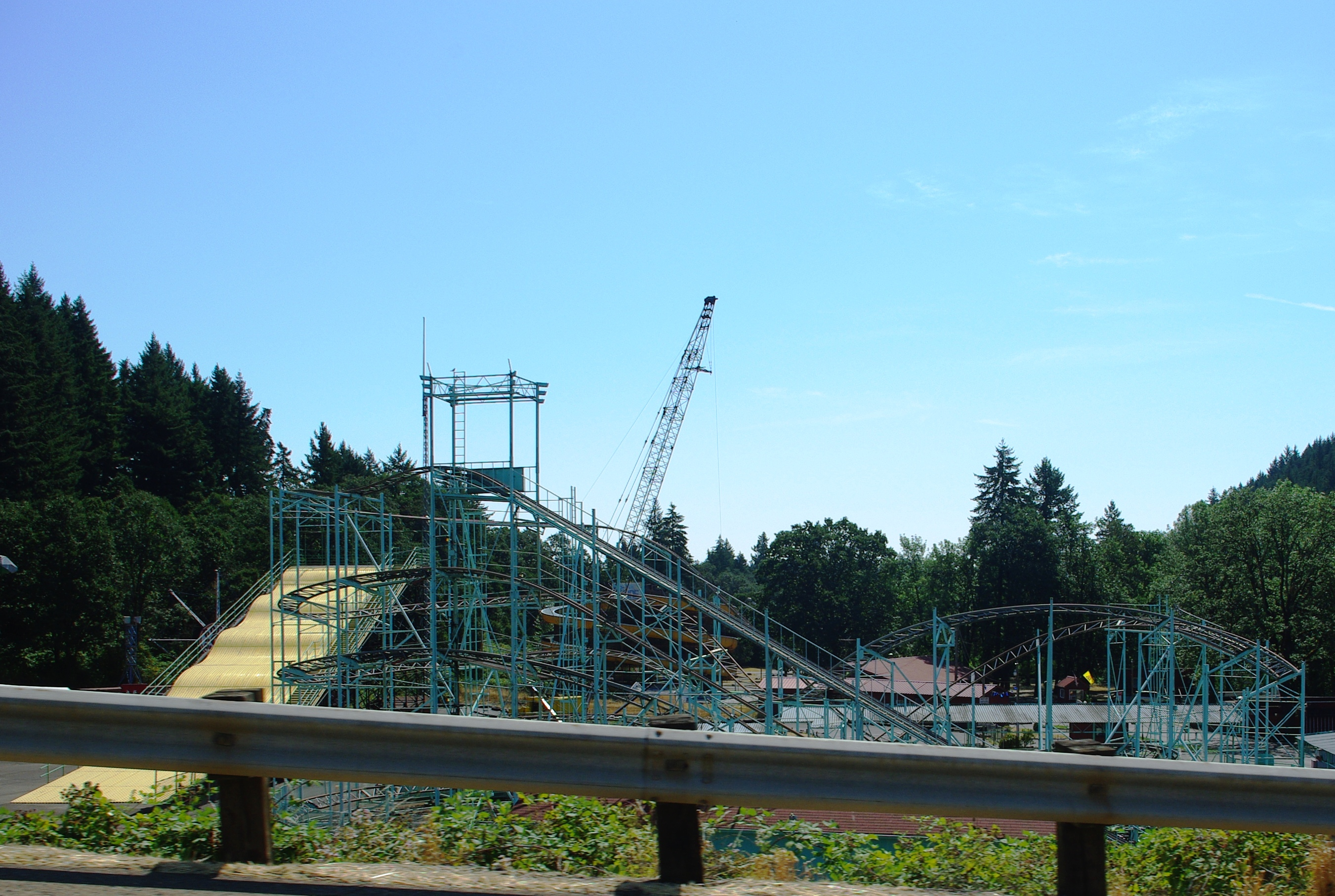
Roller coaster and slide in 2009

The park had two roller coasters, The Ripper and the Little Ripper. The bigger one was 60 feet (18 m) tall. Another ride was the Skycoaster, which lifted people 100 feet (30 m) up before dropping them to swing in their harnesses. A 55-foot (17 m) tall water slide was the largest in Oregon. It had two open-chutes that spiraled down over 350 feet (110 m) to the pool below. Other attractions included go-karts, a large slide, and miniature golf among others. Visitors were summoned to the park by a large spray foam figure named Thrillman.
