= Will Viharo =

American novelist

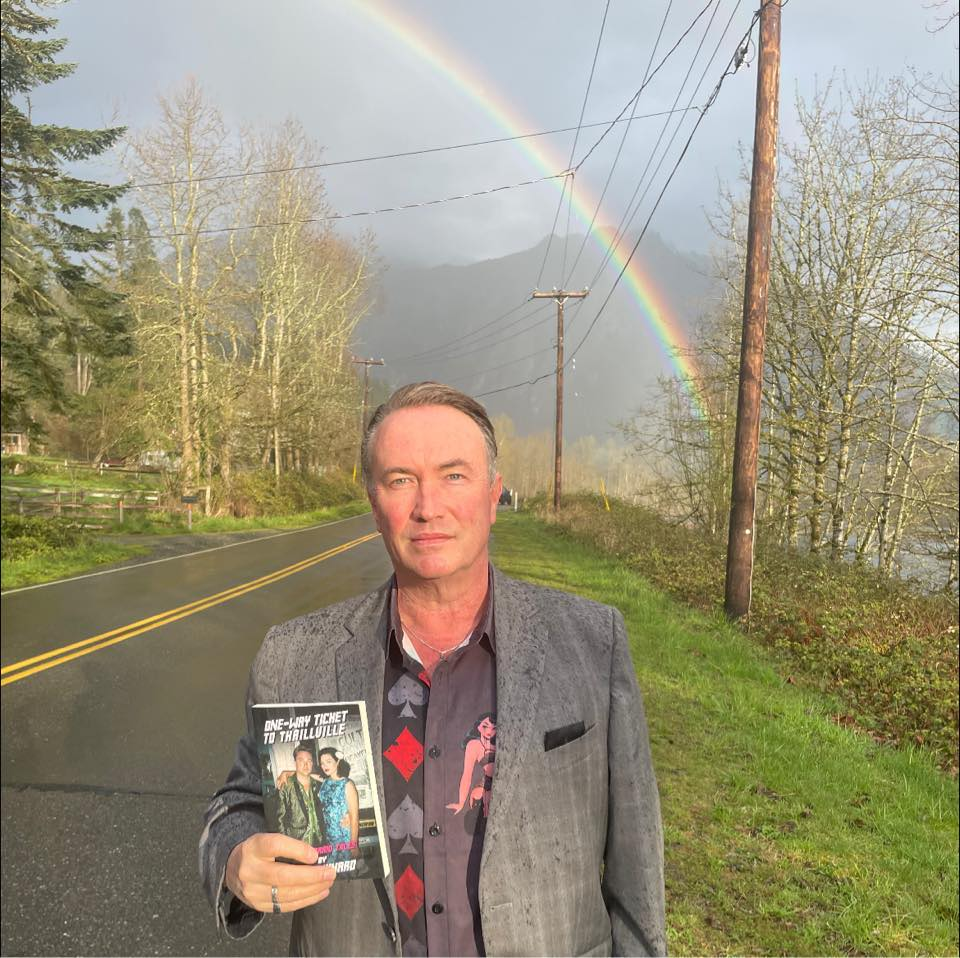
Will Viharo in North Bend, WA, April 2, 2025

Will Viharo is a Seattle-based author who has published numerous transgressive novels and stories that blend elements of surrealism, sex, and horror. He describes his work as “existential pulp fiction.”

His body of writing includes the Vic Valentine series (Love Stories Are Too Violent For Me, Fate Is My Pimp/Romance Takes A Raincheck, and I Lost My Heart In Hollywood/Diary of a Dick), Lavender Blonde, and Down A Dark Alley. Love Stories Are Too Violent For Me, originally published by Wild Card Press in 1993, was republished in August 2013 by Gutter Press, in anticipation of the movie adaption, which Christian Slater will direct and star in. In 2023, his epistolary memoir, Graffiti in the Rubber Room: Writing for My Sanity, was published.

Viharo, who was born in New York City on April 2, 1963, has also written two supernatural horror works: A Mermaid Drowns in the Midnight Lounge and Freaks That Carry Your Luggage Up To Your Room.

From 1997 to 2012, Viharo, under the name Will the Thrill, regularly hosted Thrillville, a series of B-movie showings, with his wife Monica "the Tiki Goddess" Cortes Viharo. The locations of these stagings included the Parkway Speakeasy Theater in Oakland, California, which closed in 2009; the Cerrito Theater in El Cerrito, California (now operating under different management); and the Roxie Theater in San Francisco.

Viharo's parents named him after William Shakespeare. His mother is a former beauty queen, and his father, Robert Viharo, a B-movie actor.

In April 2014, Viharo and his wife, Monica Cortes Viharo - a college professor - moved from Alameda, California to Seattle, Washington.

On July 24, 2015, Viharo's The Space Needler's Intergalactic Bar Guide, an erotic science fiction book co-authored with Scott Fulks, was published.

In a March 2014 interview, Viharo stated that he was working on short stories - "an unusual form" for him - and would soon be finishing his sixth Vic Valentine novel, then (publicly) untitled. On November 29, 2015, that novel (titled Hard-Boiled Heart) was published.

Just prior this period, actor Christian Slater—who had begun in earnest to adapt Love Stories Are Too Violent For Me for the silver screen—was side-tracked by the success of his first-season television show Mr. Robot.

== Works ==
VIC VALENTINE SERIES

Novels:

- Love Stories Are Too Violent For Me
- Hard-Boiled Heart
- Vic Valentine vs. the Vampires

Classic Case Files:

- Fate Is My Pimp
- Romance Takes a Raincheck
- I Lost My Heart in Hollywood
- Diary of a Dick

Mental Case Files:

- Vic Valentine, International Man of Mystery
- Vic Valentine, Lounge Lizard for Hire
- Vic Valentine, Space Cadet

Short stories/novella:

- Vic Valentine, Private Eye: 14 Vignettes
- Vic Valentine Fever Dreams
- All Souls Are Final plus Panty-Stuffed Snakeskin Shoe

CHUMPY WALNUT TRILOGY

- Chumpy Walnut
- The Romance of Chumpy Walnut
- Chumpy Walnut Conquers the World

THE THRILLVILLE PULP FICTION COLLECTION

- Volume One: A Mermaid Drowns in the Midnight Lounge and Freaks That Carry Your Luggage Up to the Room
- Volume Two: Lavender Blonde and Down a Dark Alley
- Volume Three: Chumpy Walnut and Other Stories

SHORT STORY COLLECTIONS/NOVELLA

- Things I Do When I’m Awake (novella)
- VIHORROR! Cocktales of Sex and Death
- One-Way Ticket to Thrillville

MEMOIR

- Graffiti in the Rubber Room: Writing for My Sanity

WITH SCOTT FULKS

- It Came From Hangar 18
- The Space Needler’s Intergalactic Bar Guide
