= Jerry Zaks =

American stage director (born 1946)

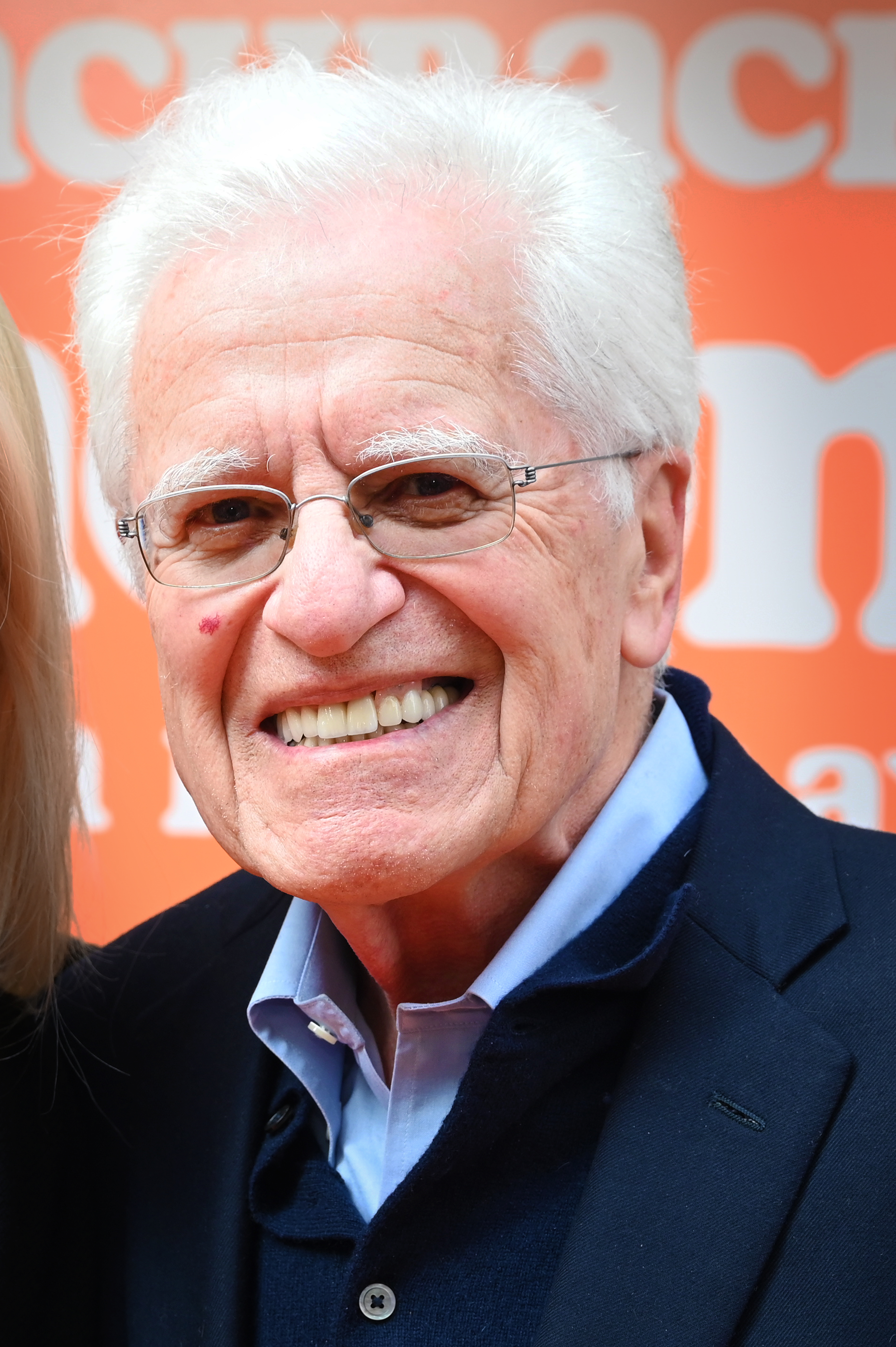
- Zaks in 2026
- Born: September 7, 1946 (age 80); Stuttgart, Germany
- Occupations: Theatre, film director
- Spouse: Melissa Gooding

Jerry Zaks (born September 7, 1946) is an American stage and television director, and actor. He won the Tony Award for Best Direction of a Play and Drama Desk Award for directing The House of Blue Leaves (1986), Lend Me a Tenor (1989), and Six Degrees of Separation (1991) and the Tony Award for Best Direction of a Musical and Drama Desk Award for Guys and Dolls (1992).

== Early life ==
Zaks was born in Stuttgart, Germany, the son of Holocaust survivors Lily (Gliksman) and Sy Zaks, a butcher. His family immigrated to the United States in 1948, finally settling in Paterson, New Jersey, where he graduated from Eastside High School in 1963. He graduated from Dartmouth College and received a Master of Fine Arts from Smith College.

== Career ==
=== Stage ===
He made his Broadway acting debut in the original production of Grease as "Kenickie" and appeared in Tintypes in 1980. He made his directing debut in 1981 with the off-Broadway production of Christopher Durang's Beyond Therapy, which co-starred Sigourney Weaver. He has directed many Broadway productions, both musicals and dramas.

He has also directed many Off-Broadway productions, several at Playwrights Horizons and the Public Theater. He directed the City Center Encores! productions of Girl Crazy (November 2009), Stairway to Paradise (May 2007), and Bye Bye Birdie (May 2004).

He was the director of the new musical The 101 Dalmatians Musical, which toured the United States from October 2009 through April 2010. Zaks was named "creative consultant" for the new musical The Addams Family, which opened on Broadway in April 2010.

He directed the Broadway production of Sister Act, which opened in Spring 2011.

=== Lincoln Center ===
Zaks served as Resident Director at Lincoln Center from 1986 to 1990 and is a founding member of the Ensemble Studio Theatre.

=== Television and film ===
As an actor, Zaks' screen credits include Outrageous Fortune, Crimes and Misdemeanors, and Husbands and Wives. On television he has appeared in M*A*S*H and The Edge of Night and directed episodes of Everybody Loves Raymond, Frasier, Hope and Faith, and Two and a Half Men, among others. He also directed the feature films Marvin's Room and Who Do You Love? Marvin's Room won the Golden St. George at the 20th Moscow International Film Festival.

=== Honors ===
Zaks received the George Abbott Award for Lifetime Achievement in the Theater in 1994 and an honorary Doctorate of Fine Arts from Dartmouth College in 1999. He was inducted into the American Theater Hall of Fame in 2013.

== Personal life ==
Jerry lives with long time partner Melissa Gooding; Jerry has two children, Emma and Hannah Zaks.

== Filmography ==
=== Film ===
Director

- Marvin's Room (1996)
- Who Do You Love? (2008)

Actor

| Year | Title | Role |
|---|---|---|
| 1987 | Outrageous Fortune | Tobacco Clerk |
| 1989 | Crimes and Misdemeanors | Man on Campus |
| 1992 | Husbands and Wives | Dinner Party Guest |

=== Television ===
Director

| Year | Title | Notes |
|---|---|---|
| 1996 | O'Henry's Christmas | Segment "The Last Leaf" |
| 2000 | The Man Who Came to Dinner | TV movie |
| 2001 | Kristin | 2 episodes |
| 2001–2004 | Everybody Loves Raymond | 21 episodes |
| 2002 | Bram and Alice | 7 episodes |
| 2002–2003 | Frasier | 4 episodes |
| 2004 | All About the Andersons | 2 episodes |
| 2004 | Married to the Kellys | Episode "Double Dating" |
| 2004 | Hope and Faith | 2 episodes |
| 2006–2007 | Two and a Half Men | 3 episodes |

Actor

| Year | Title | Role | Notes |
|---|---|---|---|
| 1973 | The New Temperatures Rising Show | | Episode "The Misguided Appendectomy" |
| 1973 | M*A*S*H | Cpl. Phil Walker | Episode "L.I.P. (Local Indigenous Personnel)" |
| 1980 | Attica | Lenny Becker | TV movie |
| 1981 | The Gentleman Bandit | Carl Schnee | TV movie |
| 1983–1984 | The Edge of Night | Louis Van Dine | 24 episodes |
| 2000 | The Beat | | Episode "Can I Get a Witness?" |

== Theatre ==
Director

| Year | Title | Venue | Ref. |
|---|---|---|---|
| 1986 | The House of Blue Leaves | Vivian Beaumont Theatre, Broadway | |
| 1986 | The Front Page | Vivian Beaumont Theatre, Broadway | |
| 1987 | Anything Goes | Vivian Beaumont Theatre, Broadway | |
| 1989 | Lend Me a Tenor | Royale Theatre, Broadway | |
| 1990 | Six Degrees of Separation | Vivian Beaumont Theatre, Broadway | |
| 1992 | Guys and Dolls | Martin Beck Theatre, Broadway | |
| 1993 | Face Value | Cort Theatre, Broadway | |
| 1993 | Laughter on the 23rd Floor | Richard Rodgers Theatre, Broadway | |
| 1995 | Smokey Joe's Cafe | Virginia Theatre, Broadway | |
| 1996 | A Funny Thing Happened on the Way to the Forum | St. James Theatre, Broadway | |
| 1999 | The Civil War | St. James Theatre, Broadway | |
| 1999 | Epic Proportions | Helen Hayes Theatre, Broadway | |
| 2000 | The Man Who Came to Dinner | American Airlines Theatre, Broadway | |
| 2001 | 45 Seconds from Broadway | Richard Rodgers Theatre, Broadway | |
| 2003 | Little Shop of Horrors | Virginia Theatre, Broadway | |
| 2004 | La Cage aux Folles | Marquis Theatre, Broadway | |
| 2006 | The Caine Mutiny Court-Martial | Gerald Schoenfeld Theatre, Broadway | |
| 2006 | Losing Louie | Biltmore Theatre, Broadway | |
| 2007 | A Bronx Tale | Walter Kerr Theatre, Broadway | |
| 2011 | Sister Act | Broadway Theatre, Broadway | |
| 2016 | A Bronx Tale | Longacre Theatre, Broadway | |
| 2017 | Hello, Dolly! | Sam S. Shubert Theatre, Broadway | |
| 2017 | Meteor Shower | Booth Theatre, Broadway | |
| 2020 | Mrs. Doubtfire | Stephen Sondheim Theatre, Broadway | |
| 2021 | The Music Man | Winter Garden Theatre, Broadway | |

Actor

| Year | Title | Role | Venue | Ref. |
|---|---|---|---|---|
| 1972 | Grease | Kenickie (Replacement) | Eden Theatre, Broadway | |
| 1978 | Once in a Lifetime | Weisskopf | Circle in the Square Theatre, Broadway | |
| 1980 | Tintypes | Performer | John Golden Theatre, Broadway | |

Production Supervisor

| Year | Title | Role | Venue | Ref. |
|---|---|---|---|---|
| 1999 | Swing! | Production Supervisor | St. James Theatre, Broadway | |

== Awards and nominations ==
| Year | Association | Category | Project | Result | Ref. |
|---|---|---|---|---|---|
| 1986 | Tony Awards | Best Direction of a Play | The House of Blue Leaves | Won | |
| 1988 | Tony Awards | Best Direction of a Musical | Anything Goes | Nominated | |
| 1989 | Tony Awards | Best Direction of a Play | Lend Me a Tenor | Won | |
| 1991 | Tony Awards | Best Direction of a Play | Six Degrees of Separation | Won | |
| 1992 | Tony Awards | Best Direction of a Musical | Guys and Dolls | Won | |
| 1995 | Tony Awards | Best Direction of a Musical | Smokey Joe's Cafe | Nominated | |
| 1996 | Tony Awards | Best Direction of a Musical | A Funny Thing Happened on the Way to the Forum | Nominated | |
| 2017 | Tony Awards | Best Direction of a Musical | Hello, Dolly! | Nominated | |
| 1980 | Drama Desk Award | Outstanding Actor in a Musical | Tintypes | Nominated | |
| 1986 | Drama Desk Award | Outstanding Director of a Play | The Marriage of Bette & Boo / The House of Blue Leaves | Won | |
| 1988 | Drama Desk Award | Outstanding Director of a Musical | Anything Goes | Nominated | |
| 1989 | Drama Desk Award | Outstanding Director of a Play | Lend Me a Tenor | Won | |
| 1991 | Drama Desk Award | Outstanding Director of a Play | Six Degrees of Separation | Won | |
| 1991 | Drama Desk Award | Outstanding Director of a Musical | Assassins | Nominated | |
| 1992 | Drama Desk Award | Outstanding Director of a Musical | Guys and Dolls | Won | |
| 2006 | Drama Desk Award | Outstanding Director of a Play | The Caine Mutiny Court-Martial | Nominated | |
| 2022 | Drama League Award | Best Direction of a Musical | The Music Man | Nominated | |
| 1985 | Obie Award | | The Marriage of Bette and Boo / The Foreigner | Won | |
| 1988 | Outer Critics Circle Awards | Best Direction | Wenceslas Square | Won | |
| 2022 | Outer Critics Circle Awards | Best Direction of a Musical | Mrs. Doubtfire | Nominated | |
