= Albert Innaurato =

American journalist

- Born: Albert Francis Innaurato Jr. June 2, 1947; Philadelphia, Pennsylvania, U.S.
- Died: September 24, 2017 (aged 70)
- Education: Central High School; Temple University; California Institute of the Arts; Yale School of Drama
- Occupations: Playwright; theatre director; writer

Albert Francis Innaurato Jr. (June 2, 1947 – September 24, 2017) was an American playwright, theatre director, and writer.

== Early life and education ==
Albert Francis Innaurato Jr. was born in Philadelphia, Pennsylvania, on June 2, 1947.

After graduating from the Central High School Class 224, Temple University, and California Institute of the Arts, Innaurato attended the Yale School of Drama.

Innaurato collaborated with Christopher Durang on The Idiots Karamazov, I Don't Normally Like Poetry but Have You Read "Trees"?, and Gyp, the Real-Life Story of Mitzi Gaynor while both were students at Yale School of Drama. They performed in all three plays, often as women dressed as priests. At Yale, they frequently appeared in plays with classmates Meryl Streep and Sigourney Weaver and their friend Wendy Wasserstein. I Don't Normally Like Poetry but Have You Read "Trees"? played in 1973 at the Manhattan Theatre Club.

== Career ==
=== Gemini ===
In 1976, he drew critical attention for the Playwrights Horizons staging of his play Gemini. A year later, after some cast changes, the play was produced at PAF Playhouse on Long Island. That production subsequently was presented off-Broadway at the Circle Repertory Company, opening March 8, 1977, where it was acclaimed by the major New York critics. The Circle Rep production transferred to Broadway, where it ran for 1819 performances and earned him an Obie Award and a Drama Desk Award nomination for Outstanding New American Play. The screen adaptation, which Innaurato did not write, was released in 1980 under the title Happy Birthday, Gemini. Showtime created a "staged for video" version for cable television in 1982, starring Danny Aiello (Fran), Anne De Salvo (Lucille), and Scott Baio (Francis).

Gemini was controversial in its time for its frankness about and advocacy of tolerance for homosexuality. It also addresses the difficulties of the acculturation process, and the tensions caused by the different perspectives and values of second and third generation Americans as the hero, a Harvard student, attempts to navigate between American and Italian-American culture.

In 2006, Innaurato's hit play was turned into a musical, Gemini: The Musical and presented at the Prince Music Theater in Philadelphia, starring Robert Picardo, Linda Hart, Anne De Salvo, Barry James, Jillian Louis, Jeremiah Downes and Todd Buonopane.

=== Other stage plays ===
The Transfiguration of Benno Blimpie, which earned Innaurato another Obie and a second Drama Desk nomination for Outstanding New American Play, has been produced twice off-Broadway. A production Innaurato directed at Playwrights' Horizons starring Peter Evans won a rave from critic Frank Rich. It was staged in London, where Innaurato directed, Italy, Spain, and Israel.

The 1977 play Ulysses in Traction opened at the Circle Repertory Company in New York.

Additional theatre credits include Passione at both Playwrights Horizons (where Innaurato directed) and on Broadway (directed by Frank Langella), Magda and Callas, Coming of Age in Soho (directed by Innaurato twice at Joseph Papp's Public Theater), Gus and Al (given two runs at Playwrights' Horizons), and Dreading Thekla. Early plays still considered obscene and difficult like Earthworms, Urlicht, and Wisdom Amok were published with Gemini and Benno Blimpie in a volume titled Bizarre Behavior. Coming of Age in Soho, Gemini, and Benno Blimpie appeared in a collection called The Best Plays of Albert Innaurato. Urlicht was staged at New York's Clark Center for the Performing Arts in March 1974, featuring Tobias Haller and Helen Hanft, directed by Edward M. Cohen.

After a 25-year absence from the New York stage, his play Doubtless premiered at the 59E59 in 2014; its use of nuns is a reference to John Patrick Shanley's 2004 play Doubt.

=== Television ===
Innaurato's television credits include The Days and Nights of Molly Dodd and Verna: USO Girl, for which he received a nomination for an Emmy Award. He was a frequent contributor of short plays to PBS in the 1980s, including the Trying Times episode "Death and Taxes", starring Sally Kirkland. He adapted the book and wrote lyrics for a broadcast of the Kurt Weill/Ira Gershwin/Moss Hart musical Lady in the Dark. He worked with Byron Janis on a musical treatment of The Hunchback of Notre-Dame, given in Cuba as part of a cultural exchange.

=== Other work ===
Innaurato adapted Puccini's La rondine for Lincoln Center. He was a frequent contributor to parterre box, The New York Times, Vogue, Vanity Fair, New York Magazine, and Newsday. He was a frequent contributor to Opera News in the 1990s. For the Metropolitan Opera Guild, produced by Paul Gruber, he recorded 20 tapes/CDs of opera, some with him at the piano. He lectured for the New York Philharmonic, the Los Angeles Philharmonic, and the Chamber Music Society of Lincoln Center. He taught playwriting at Columbia University in the Graduate School for eight years and taught at Princeton University, Yale School of Drama, Temple University and Rutgers University.

Innaurato was the artistic director of Creative Development Projects at Center City Opera Theater in Philadelphia. He contributed to the development as dramaturg and director of workshops of new operas such as Paul's Case by Gregory Spears, Love/Hate by Rob Bailis and Jack Perla, Slaying the Dragon by Michael Ching, The Great Blondin by Ronald Vigue to which he contributed the libretto and other works.

He directed the American premiere of The Shops by Edward Rushton and Dagny Gioulami in December 2010, given a site specific production at the Comcast Center in Philadelphia.

For the company Innaurato also directed Don Pasquale, The Magic Flute, Eugene Onegin, Rigoletto and Suor Angelica, among other works.

== Recognition ==
In 1975 Innaurato was awarded a Guggenheim Fellowship to study drama and performance art, a Rockefeller Grant and later received grants from the National Endowment for the Arts in 1986 and 1989.

== Death ==
Innaurato was found dead on September 26, 2017, and was thought to have died two days earlier on September 24. He was 70.
