= Ray Sharkey =

American actor (1952–1993)

- Born: Raymond Sharkey Jr. November 14, 1952; New York City, New York, U.S.
- Died: June 11, 1993 (aged 40); New York City, New York, U.S.
- Cause of death: Complications from AIDS
- Resting place: Saint Charles Cemetery
- Education: New York City Community College; HB Studio
- Occupation: Actor
- Years active: 1974–1992
- Spouses: Rebecca Wood (m. 1981; div. 1986) Carole Graham (m. 1988; div. 1992)
- Children: 1

Raymond Sharkey Jr. (November 14, 1952 – June 11, 1993) was an American actor. He won a Golden Globe Award for Best Actor in a Motion Picture – Musical or Comedy for his performance in the film The Idolmaker (1980), and was nominated for Best Actor – Miniseries or Television Film for the made-for-TV movie The Ordeal of Bill Carney (1982). He was also known for his role as Sonny Steelgrave on the first season of the television crime drama Wiseguy (1987).

Sharkey was diagnosed as HIV positive in the late 1980s, but remained in denial about his status until shortly before his death of AIDS-related complications in June 1993.

== Early life ==
Sharkey was born in Brooklyn to Cecelia Formisano and Ray Sharkey, Sr. He was of Irish and Italian descent. Sharkey's father was a professional drummer who abandoned the family when Sharkey was five years old. He was raised by his mother, Cecelia, in Brooklyn's Red Hook neighborhood. Sharkey became interested in acting after seeing Jack Lemmon in the 1962 film Days of Wine and Roses.

After attending New York City Community College for one year, he enrolled at the HB Studio to study acting. He made his film debut with a bit part in The Lords of Flatbush. In 1973, he and his friend, boxer/actor Chu Chu Malave, moved to Los Angeles to pursue acting careers.

== Career ==
Sharkey went on to appear in more than forty motion pictures and dozens of guest appearances on various television series.

An early standout performance in a character role came in Who'll Stop the Rain (1978), directed by Karel Reisz. The film's editor, John Bloom, said, "I do not believe there’s ever been a better pair of villains than Richard Masur and Ray Sharkey — funny and terrifying in equal measure." This echoed a contemporary review, which called them "psychopaths played to the hilt" and added, "They're a great team. Whether they are supposed to be so funny, even when they are shouting obscenities, only the director knows. But funny they are."

In 1980, Sharkey portrayed rock promoter Vinnie Vacarri in The Idolmaker. The role boosted Sharkey's career and earned him a Golden Globe Award for his performance in the film. The following year, he was nominated for another Golden Globe for his role in The Ordeal of Bill Carney, in which he played the title role. Shortly after appearing in The Idolmaker, Sharkey developed a $400 a day heroin habit. As a result of his drug use, his career declined and he was relegated to mainly supporting roles. He overdosed several times and was involved in four drug-related car accidents, two of which required him to undergo microsurgery on his eyes. He tried undergoing rehab treatment several times but would ultimately relapse a few months later. In 1987, Sharkey spent two months in an Orange County rehab center in an effort to kick his drug and alcohol addiction for good.

Four days after leaving rehab, he won the role of Sonny Steelgrave in the series Wiseguy. One reviewer remarked, "The Steelgrave episodes were wonderful, partly because of Sharkey's performance as the tough-tender Sonny." Another stated, "Sharkey's portrayal of Steelgrave, with his murderous, mercurial charm, has been likened to James Cagney's Cody Jarrett in White Heat". Producer Stephen J. Cannell and many fans were sorry to see Sharkey's character go, but the format of Wiseguy was self-contained story "arcs" of several episodes. The character proved to be popular with audiences. Many letters came in to ask that he return, prompting the writing of Steelgrave in future episodes (usually with the lead character dreaming about Steelgrave). A 2008 Entertainment Weekly retrospective on "The 50 Biggest Emmy Snubs" ranked Sharkey's Steelgrave as #26.

With that career boost, Sharkey then co-starred in the biographical film Wired. Based on the life of John Belushi, Sharkey portrayed a Puerto Rican angel who meets Belushi after his death in the morgue and "show[s] him the error of his ways." Sharkey's next role was in the 1989 black comedy film Scenes from the Class Struggle in Beverly Hills.

In 1991, he starred in the ABC sitcom The Man in the Family. While Sharkey received good reviews for his performance, the show was panned by critics and canceled after one season. The following year, he appeared in a guest spot on Jake and the Fatman; and co-starred in the independent film Zebrahead, as well as the lead in the television movie In the Line of Duty: Street War. On July 30, 1992, while filming a guest spot on the television series, The Hat Squad, in Vancouver, he was arrested for drug possession. Canadian customs officials, making a routine inspection of incoming cargo at the airport, discovered small amounts of cocaine and heroin in a black envelope being sent from Los Angeles to Sharkey in Vancouver. Police searched his hotel room and found an additional supply of drugs. He was jailed and later released on bail. Sharkey was later fired from The Hat Squad. Sharkey's final role was in the 1993 comedy film Cop and a Half.

== Personal life ==
In May 1981, Sharkey married model Rebecca Wood. The marriage ended in 1986 due to Sharkey's drug abuse. In 1988, he married actress Carole Graham. That marriage produced one daughter, Cecelia, in 1989. In November 1992, Graham divorced Sharkey, also citing his drug abuse as the reason for the divorce.

=== Illness and death ===
Sharkey was diagnosed as HIV positive in the late 1980s. He reportedly contracted the virus through intravenous drug use. After his death, Sharkey's manager Herb Nanas admitted that they both decided to keep his diagnosis a secret, fearing it would hurt his career. Despite his diagnosis, Sharkey remained in denial about his HIV-positive status and, according to his manager, had sex with an estimated 100 women after he was diagnosed.

Sharkey began a relationship with model/actress Elena Monica, daughter of comedian Corbett Monica, in April 1991. She became ill and was hospitalized with aseptic meningitis in July 1991. During a routine check, she tested positive for HIV. Monica believed she contracted the virus from Sharkey, who continued to deny that he had infected her. Monica ended the relationship in October 1991 due to her suspicions. In July 1992, she learned that another woman also suspected that Sharkey had infected her with HIV as well. Later that same year, Monica filed a $52 million lawsuit against the actor for knowingly infecting her with HIV.

In an interview with Details magazine conducted in March 1993, three months before his death, Sharkey told the reporter that he was in fact HIV-positive by saying that he "harbored a strain of HIV" that he believed would never develop into AIDS. At the time of the interview, Sharkey weighed 80 pounds (36 kg), had a hacking cough and was suffering from a brain lesion. When asked about his ex-girlfriend Elena Monica who accused him of infecting her with HIV, Sharkey said, "This disease is funny. One day you're negative and the next day you're positive. And people suffer. I don't think she suffered from me." Monica won her lawsuit against Sharkey by default judgment after his death (Sharkey declined to challenge her suit when it was originally filed), but she received no compensation from his estate because the actor had very little money.

Sharkey died of complications from AIDS at Lutheran Medical Center in Brooklyn, New York, on June 11, 1993, at age 40. He is interred in Saint Charles Cemetery in Farmingdale, Long Island, New York.

In June 1993, shortly after Sharkey's death, a Beverly Hills graphic designer who said she had an on-and-off relationship with Sharkey from 1985 to 1991 announced that she was suing Sharkey's estate. The woman, who was only identified as "Joyce", cared for Sharkey in his final months and said that she believed that she also had contracted HIV from Sharkey after she was diagnosed with the virus in April 1992.

== Filmography ==
=== Film ===
Ray Sharkey Film credits
| Year | Title | Role | Notes |
|---|---|---|---|
| 1974 | The Lords of Flatbush | Student | |
| 1976 | Trackdown | "Flash" | |
| 1977 | Hot Tomorrows | Louis | |
| 1977 | Stunts | Paul Salerno | |
| 1978 | Who'll Stop the Rain | "Smitty" | |
| 1978 | Paradise Alley | "Legs" | |
| 1980 | Heart Beat | Ira | |
| 1980 | Willie & Phil | Phil D'Amico | |
| 1980 | The Idolmaker | Vinnie Vacarri | |
| 1982 | Love and Money | Byron Levin | |
| 1982 | Some Kind of Hero | Sgt. Vinnie DiAngelo | |
| 1983 | Regina Roma | Carry | |
| 1984 | Body Rock | Terrence Mitchell | |
| 1984 | Du-beat-e-o | Du-beat-e-o | |
| 1985 | Hellhole | Silk | |
| 1986 | Wise Guys | Marco | |
| 1986 | No Mercy | Angles Ryan | |
| 1987 | P.I. Private Investigations | Ryan | |
| 1988 | Act of Piracy | Jack Wilcox | |
| 1989 | Scenes from the Class Struggle in Beverly Hills | Frank | |
| 1989 | Wired | Angel Velasquez | |
| 1990 | The Rain Killer | Capra | |
| 1992 | Caged Fear | Warden Hayes | |
| 1992 | Zebrahead | Richard | |
| 1992 | Dead On: Relentless II | Kyle Valsone | |
| 1992 | Round Trip to Heaven | 'Stoneface' | |
| 1993 | Cop and a Half | Vinnie 'Fountain' | |

=== Television ===
Ray Sharkey television credits
| Year | Title | Role | Notes |
|---|---|---|---|
| 1974 | Kojak | Detective Gallagher | 4 episodes |
| 1975 | On the Rocks | Opie | Episode: "Champion" |
| 1975 | All in the Family | Man At Clinic | Episode: "Chain Letter" |
| 1975 | Barney Miller | David Salas / Hold-Up Man | 2 episodes |
| 1975 | The Jeffersons | Robert Phelps | Episode: "Tennis Anyone?" |
| 1976 | Police Story | Pete Samper | Episode: "Payment Deferred" |
| 1977 | The Streets of San Francisco | Benny Lester | Episode: "Time Out" |
| 1981 | Saturday Night Live | Himself (host) / Various roles | Episode: "Ray Sharkey/Jack Bruce & Friends" |
| 1985 | Miami Vice | Bobby Profile | Episode: "Tale of the Goat" |
| 1985 | The Equalizer | Geoffery Dryden | Episode: "Desperately" |
| 1986 | Faerie Tale Theatre | Grand Vizier | Episode: "Aladdin and His Wonderful Lamp" |
| 1986–87 | Crime Story | U.S. Attorney Harry Breitel | 5 episodes |
| 1987–89 | Wiseguy | Sonny Steelgrave | Regular role; Season 1 Guest; Season 2 |
| 1989 | The Hitchhiker | Eric Coleman | Episode: "In Living Color" |
| 1990 | The American Playwrights Theater: The One Acts | Silva Vaccaro | Episode: "27 Wagons Full of Cotton" |
| 1991 | The Man in the Family | Sal Bavasso | Main cast |
| 1991 | Riders in the Sky | 'Spongehead' | Episode: "Saddle Pals" |
| 1992 | Jake and the Fatman | Michael 'Mickey' Daytona Da Silva | Episode: "Beautiful Dreamer" |
| 1992 | The Ray Bradbury Theater | The Father | Episode: "By the Numbers" |

==== TV films and miniseries ====
Ray Sharkey television credits
| Year | Title | Role | Notes |
|---|---|---|---|
| 1977 | Best Friends | Lionel 'Big O' Lapidus | |
| 1981 | The Ordeal of Bill Carney | Bill Carney | |
| 1989 | The Neon Empire | Junior Molov | |
| 1989 | The Revenge of Al Capone | "Scarface" | |
| 1990 | The Take | Dennis | |
| 1990 | Good Cops, Bad Cops | Captain Gerry Clemente | |
| 1992 | Chrome Soldiers | Gabe Ricci | |
| 1992 | In the Line of Duty: Street War | Detective Victor Tomasino | |

== Awards and nominations ==
| Award | Year | Category | Work | Result | Ref. |
|---|---|---|---|---|---|
| Golden Globe Awards | 1981 | Best Motion Picture Actor - Musical/Comedy | The Idolmaker | Won | |
| Golden Globe Awards | 1982 | Best Performance by an Actor in a Mini-Series or Motion Picture Made for TV | The Ordeal of Bill Carney | Nominated | |
| Viewers for Quality Television Awards | 1988 | Founder's Award | Wiseguy | Won | |
