= Sarah Holcomb =

American actress

- Occupation: Actress
- Years active: 1978-1980

Sarah Holcomb is an American former actress.

== Career ==
Her first role was in National Lampoon's Animal House (1978) as Clorette DePasto, the young teenage daughter of Mayor Carmine DePasto (portrayed by Cesare Danova), who does not disclose her true age when a college student invites her to a fraternity party.

Following Animal House, she appeared as Maggie O'Hooligan in Caddyshack (1980), the girlfriend of character Danny Noonan (Michael O'Keefe).

Holcomb was also cast in Jaws 2 (1978), but she was one of several teenaged actors who were eliminated from the film during pre-production.

== Personal life ==
Holcomb struggled with mental illness and drug abuse. She was institutionalized for a period before stabilizing and retiring from the entertainment industry and avoiding publicity. The character of Dori Lawrence in the film Stateside, an actress who has schizophrenia, is partly based on Holcomb.

== Filmography ==
Year	Title	Role	Notes
1978	Animal House	Clorette DePasto	
1979	Walk Proud	Sarah Lassiter	
1979	Mr. Mike's Mondo Video	Herself	
1980	Happy Birthday, Gemini	Judith Hastings	
1980	Caddyshack	Maggie O'Hooligan	
