= The Nerd (play) =

1981 comedy play by Larry Shue

- Original language: English
- Written by: Larry Shue
- Characters: Willum Cubbert; Tansy McGinnis; Axel Hammond; Rick Steadman; Warnock Waldgrave; Clelia Waldgrave; Thor Waldgrave
- Genre: Comedy
- Setting: Terre Haute, Indiana, 1979

Premiere
- Date: April 1981
- Place: Milwaukee Repertory Theater

The Nerd is a 1981 two-act comedy written by American playwright and actor Larry Shue. Actors who have taken on the title role include British comedian Rowan Atkinson. It was the top grossing American play in London's West End in 1986.

== Plot ==
Set in Terre Haute, Indiana in late 1979, The Nerd presents the story of Willum Cubbert, an unassuming young architect, who is landlord to friends Tansy and Axel. Tansy is a smart, attractive woman, with a mutual (but unconsummated) attraction to Willum; she is determined to leave in order to pursue a career in television meteorology in Washington, D.C. Axel is a smart aleck drama critic who was once engaged, briefly, to Tansy. The three of them are good friends. Axel and Tansy are present when Willum, during a house party, becomes host to unexpected houseguest Rick Steadman, who had saved Willum's life in Vietnam.

Over the years, Willum and Rick had exchanged occasional letters and greeting cards, though they never met. Willum has promised Rick that he could come to him for help at any time. While Willum is hosting a dinner party for his client (Warnock Waldgrave, for whom he is designing a hotel), Rick shows up. His awkward manner and inappropriate behavior throw the occasion into shambles. Rick decides to move in, and Willum feels that he can't say no, even when Rick begins to destroy his professional relationship with Mr. Waldgrave. Eventually at his wit's end, Axel devises a plan to get rid of Rick, which Willum decides to take a chance on.

The plan is enacted during a "traditional Terre Haute dinner" that Willum, Tansy, and Axel plan for Rick. They try to do as many strange things as they can think of, in order to get Rick to leave. They serve warm water and cottage cheese for the meal, and talk about imaginary traditions from their youth, such as shooting down planes. Upon learning that Rick is afraid of pigs, Axel tells him that Willum turns into a pig when the moon is full. They begin a "hideous Pagan ritual", chanting and marching to a pig-god in order for Willum to stay a man. During the "ritual," cottage cheese is thrown out the window. Waldgrave soon enters the room, covered in cottage cheese. Unbeknownst to Willum, Rick had invited him for dinner. Waldgrave tears up Willum's contract and storms out. Having been pushed over the brink, Willum begins packing Rick's things, and finally forces him to leave.

What Willum and Tansy never learn is that "Rick Steadman" is not actually Rick Steadman, the brave man who risked his own life to save Willum. The intruder is actually an actor, Kemp Hall, who was persuaded by Axel to impersonate Rick Steadman in order to make Willum understand his real priorities. Kemp, playing the nerd, drives Willum almost to (comical) violence as he becomes increasingly impossible to live with. Kemp has also, in the character of a man named Red Graham, been leaving phone messages for Willum, asking him to build a housing estate in Alexandria, Virginia; Axel points out to Willum that this is very close to Washington, D.C., and therefore very close to where Tansy is moving.

At the climax, Willum finally finds what Tansy calls the "gumption" to order Rick out of his home. He declares that he will leave for Alexandria the next day and "court Tansy till she cracks." Tansy agrees that it is a good plan, and the two of them go out for some dinner. Axel is alone in the room and calls Kemp to say, "I think we did it, babe...I think a hundred percent." Kemp joins him; no longer the klutzy Rick, he is now an urbane, intelligent man. Kemp wonders what the real Rick Steadman is like, and Axel says, "Nice fella, probably." Kemp, who has made Willum's life hell for weeks, says, "Not a bad fellow, your friend Willum." Axel provides the theme of the play when he replies, "He's all right. He just needed to have his life interfered with a little, that's all."

== Productions ==
The Nerd first came to life at Milwaukee Repertory Theater through a staged reading in the 1979/80 Season, back at the old Court Street Theater. It was such a success that it received its World Premiere the next season on the theater’s Main Stage (at the PAC’s Todd Wehr Theater) in April 1981. Author Larry Shue played the role of Willum Cubbert. It went on to be remounted in the 1995/96 (Quadracci Powerhouse Theater) and 2006/07 Seasons (Stiemke Studio). The Nerd had its fourth full production by the Milwaukee Repertory Theater in the 2019/20 Season.

The play had its European premiere in 1982. It was directed by Braham Murray at the Royal Exchange, Manchester and starred Derek Griffiths as Rick and David Horovitch as Willum.

The play ran on Broadway for 441 performances (March 22, 1987 – April 10, 1988), starring Mark Hamill and directed by Charles Nelson Reilly.

In the 1987 production, the action diverged from the play in places, such as Robert Joy (as Rick) squawking like a chicken when the guests at Willum's party begin to eat deviled eggs and, later, spraying Redi-Whip into his mouth.

In 1989, NBC commissioned a sitcom pilot adapted from the play, with John Dye, Harley Jane Kozak and Robert Joy, who reprised his role. A series wasn't optioned but the episode was eventually broadcast in March 1996.

The show premiered in New England at Merrimack Repertory Theatre in Lowell, Massachusetts. The show starred Robert Walsh (Willum Cubbert), Ellen Harvey (Tansy McGinnis), Jeff Levy-Lyons (Axel Hammond), William A. Kilmer (Warnock Waldgrave), David Benoit (Rick Steadman), Benari Poulten and Jamey Dereshinsky (Celia Waldgrave).

== Characters ==
- Willum Cubbert: Willum is an architect, currently designing a hotel for Mr. Waldgrave, and a pushover. He's kind and intelligent, but Tansy says he "could use a little gumption." He lacks the backbone to stand up for himself. Originally played by Mark Hamill on Broadway, and later replaced by Gary Burghoff. He rents two rooms in his house to Tansy and Axel.
- Tansy McGinnis: A smart woman who is as attracted to Willum as he is to her, but who has been offered her dream job as a television weather forecaster in Washington, D.C., and feels guilty for leaving Willum behind. Idealistic, perky, and just as kind as Willum. The role was created by Patricia Kalember on Broadway.
- Axel Hammond: Willum's best friend. He's a pretentious, often-inebriated drama critic, always ready with a sarcastic comment. Originally played by Peter Riegert on Broadway.
- Rick Steadman/Kemp Hall: The titular "nerd." He's oblivious to insult and lacks manners or sensitivity. He tells Willum that he works as an inspector at a chalk factory in Wisconsin. Originally played by Robert Joy on Broadway.
- Warnock Waldgrave: A boisterous, slightly dim businessman, owner of eight hotels, with no creativity and no tact. He never smiles. Originally played by Wayne Tippit on Broadway.
- Clelia Waldgrave: Mr. Waldgrave's high-strung, put-upon wife. She holds back all of her emotions, and only releases her stress when she can break "something small." Originally played by Pamela Blair on Broadway.
- Thor Waldgrave: The Waldgraves' terror of a son. "Poster child for Planned Parenthood," as Axel calls him. Spends most of the play hiding in a closet or bedroom. Originally played by Timothy Geissler on Broadway.

== Themes ==
This comedy play has some serious themes running throughout.

=== Selflessness ===
When Willum has a surprise birthday party from Axel and Tansy, he tells Tansy and Axel that he owes his life to Rick Steadman, who was himself badly injured when he found Willum injured in Vietnam, and Rick pulled Willum to safety. He even made sure that Willum received medical attention before he himself did. Willum has never met the man, but has corresponded with him over the years out of gratitude. Willum always promised that if Rick needed help of any kind, Willum would be there for him.

=== Selfishness ===
Tansy challenges Axel that, because she perceives him as being self-absorbed all the time, she would like to see him do an anonymous favor for someone, just one time: "I'd feel easier about leaving here if I could see you once just go crazy and do something for somebody." Axel replies jokingly (the stage directions say "As Bill Sykes"): "Not this bloke. A villain I be, and a villain I'll stay." However, unbeknownst to Tansy and Willum, Axel has already set in motion the sort of demonstration of love that Tansy had a vague idea of: Axel has persuaded Kemp Hall to act as Rick Steadman and to behave unbearably, to force Willum to discover the "gumption" that he must find in himself. In many ways, this play resembles the short story "The Unrest-Cure" by Saki, in which a young man interferes with a household in order to make the denizens appreciate what they have.

== Critical reception ==
Author Thomas M. Disch gave a mixed review of a 1987 performance, saying that the play "has whole half-hours that border on the moronic," yet it "racks up more laughs, and louder, than any farce this side of Alan Ayckbourn. Noises Off is an academic exercise by comparison, and The House of Blue Leaves demure." Disch concluded, "At some point disbelief ceases to be suspended, but even then it's possible to enjoy the ride."

Frank Rich, who also saw the play with Mark Hamill and Robert Joy, thought that while "Mr. Shue provides some bright one-liners," the play reminded him of "the cartoon world of Lucille Ball and Gale Gordon."
