= Robert Viharo =

American actor (born 1942)

- Born: August 14, 1942 (age 83); U.S.
- Occupation: Actor
- Years active: 1960's - 2000's
- Spouses: Anne Helm (m. 1972; div. 1980) Jeane Manson (m. 1981, divorced)
- Children: 2 including Will Viharo

Robert Viharo (born August 14, 1942) is an American actor. He made an early appearance in 1966 as Harry in Dark Shadows. He is known for his role in Valley of the Dolls (1967) in the part of a Broadway director. He had the starring role as Zachary Kane in the action film Bare Knuckles (1977). He also played the part of Col. Ernesto Dorio in the film Romero (1989).

== Television ==
From 1966 to 1991, he appeared in numerous television shows. In Dark Shadows in 1966, he played the part of Harry. In the same year, he was in The Fugitive. In the Gunsmoke episode "The Sodbusters" (1972), he played the part of the gunslinger Dick Shaw. In The High Chaparral episode "Alliance" (1969), he played the part of Johhny Ringo. In Starsky & Hutch he played 2 roles un both episodes: Vern Dubois in S1E20 Running and John Gallagher/Jack Cunningham in S3E10 The collector.

The 1980s saw him in such shows as Hardcastle and McCormick in the "Black Widow" episode, TJ Hooker playing the part of John Simone in the "Funny Money" episode, Hill Street Blues in the "Last Chance Salon" episode, and starring as Jake Calbar in 'The Deadly Collection' episode of The New Mike Hammer. He also appeared in CHiPs.

In the early 1990s, he played Caesar in Palace Guard.

== Film ==
In the 1960s, he appeared in Valley of the Dolls (1967), Villa Rides (1968), and Stuntman (1968). Viharo starred alongside Sherry Jackson as Zachary Kane in Bare Knuckles (1977), a film about a bounty hunter.

His other films included Return to Macon County (1975), I Never Promised You a Rose Garden (1977), The Evil (1978), Hide in Plain Sight (1980), Happy Birthday, Gemini (1980), and The Night Stalker (1987). One of his later roles was in Presque Isle (2007).

== Personal life ==
Viharo was married to actress Jennifer West in the late 1960s; the couple had two sons, Rome Viharo (d. Dec. 15, 2025) and Zola Viharo.

Viharo was married to actress Anne Helm in the early 1970s and divorced some time later. They had one daughter together. Helm's marriage to Viharo was her second. In 1981 he married actress and singer Jeane Manson; the marriage was short-lived.

He is also the father of Will Viharo, an author.
