= Behind-the-scenes =

Documentary film that features the production of a film or television program

In filmmaking, behind-the-scenes (BTS), also known as the making-of, the set, or on the set, is a documentary film that features the production of a film or television program. This is often referred to as the EPK (electronic press kit) video, due to its main usage as a promotional tool, either concurrent with theatrical release or as a bonus feature for the film's DVD or Blu-ray release.

== History ==
The first making-of is not definitively known, though some argue that it is the 1908 short, Making Movie Pictures: A Day in the Vitagraph Studio. Another significant making-of was A Tour of the Tom Ince Studios in 1920; the featurette contained a frame stating that it "was produced for exhibitor use at no charge as a publicity 'gimmick' and features Ince's top talent in one of the best 'inside' looks at a silent movie studio ever put on film."

In the 1930s, many studios utilized behind-the-scenes to promote upcoming actors, technology, and releases; the production of behind-the-scenes was then restricted in the 1950s due to programming changes caused by the Paramount Decree. In the 1960s, behind-the-scenes regained popularity when studios sought to advertise through television, a rising medium for promotion.

In the age of DVDs, shorter behind-the-scenes documentaries were often used as a bonus to give more insight into the film, how it was made, and to credit the film crew. Occasionally, some films included a "making of the making-of" as a joke. The making-of was also often released for television as a part of the promotion of the film.

In the 2020s, many streaming services include behind-the-scenes on their platforms for viewers to conveniently watch. Netflix's Tudum has a page consisting of various behind-the-scenes content for its many shows and movies. Behind-the-scenes content is also often posted on YouTube, TikTok, and other forms of social media.

== Purpose ==
Behind-the-scenes footage allows viewers to have a greater appreciation for the work that goes into creating movie magic and other aspects of the entertainment industry. Lesser recognized but essential jobs get a moment to shine. Similarly, behind-the-scenes allows the opportunity to spotlight how new technology elevates scenes.

The extra footage acts as an incentive for fans to buy physical and digital copies of the films. For example, bloopers allow fans to see a new side of their celebrity idols. Likewise, by seeing how the set looks before special effects are added in, fans have a new appreciation for the actors and technology. When streaming services post behind-the-scenes footage on social media, it can also grab the attention of new audiences and increase viewership.

== Alternative applications ==
Though behind-the-scenes typically refers to the inner workings of movies, it can apply to other events, processes, and products, such as concerts, renovations, and other business ventures.

In the age of social media, many companies create behind-the-scenes content to humanize the brand. Some examples are day-in-the-life, meet the team, and before and after videos. Even a "Get Ready With Me" video can be behind-the-scenes content if it promotes the inner workings of the event, such as an actress showing how the set's makeup artists prepare her for a scene. These videos make consumers more likely to follow and buy the product or service they are promoting.

== Examples of behind-the-scenes ==
- Burden of Dreams, the Fitzcarraldo making-of.
- Hearts of Darkness: A Filmmaker's Apocalypse, the Apocalypse Now making-of.
- Lost in La Mancha, The Man Who Killed Don Quixote making-of.
- Jim & Andy: The Great Beyond, a behind-the-scenes of the 1999 Andy Kaufman biopic Man on the Moon.
- The End of an Era, the making-of docuseries of Taylor Swift's The Eras Tour.
- That Moment: Magnolia Diary, the Magnolia making-of.
- How Did They Ever Make a Movie of Facebook?, The Social Network making-of.

== See also ==
- Development hell
- Director's cut
- The Criterion Collection – a home media company specializing in special features on important and popular movie titles
