= Tony Clifton =

Character created by Andy Kaufman

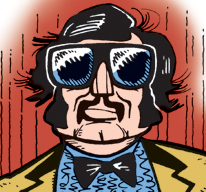
- Cartoon of Tony Clifton
- First appearance: 1970s
- Created by: Andy Kaufman
- Portrayed by: Andy Kaufman; Bob Zmuda; Jim Carrey; Paul Giamatti; Michael Kaufman

In-universe information
- Gender: Male
- Occupation: Lounge singer
- Origin: United States
- Nationality: American

Tony Clifton is a character created by comedian and performance artist Andy Kaufman in the late 1970s. An absurdly foul-mouthed and domineering lounge singer claiming to hail from Las Vegas, the tuxedo-clad Clifton often led unsuspecting audiences through awkward yet elaborate lounge singer performances. Kaufman appeared as Clifton on stage and on television programs ranging from The Merv Griffin Show to The Fantastic Miss Piggy Show.

The character has also been performed on stage by longtime Kaufman friend Bob Zmuda. Clifton was portrayed by actor Jim Carrey (who also portrayed Kaufman) in the 1999 film Man on the Moon and in the documentary Jim & Andy: The Great Beyond. Zmuda, who also played Clifton in Man on the Moon, was portrayed by Paul Giamatti.

== Origin ==
Kaufman would sometimes claim that Tony Clifton was a real lounge singer whom Kaufman encountered at the International Hotel in Las Vegas in 1969. He said he was waiting for Elvis Presley to arrive so he could meet him. Kaufman may have seen Clifton as the antithesis of the sweet, gentle "Foreign Man" character he was best known for (which was later adapted into Latka Gravas, Kaufman's character on Taxi).

Clifton would often attempt to improvise comical lyrics that were intentionally unfunny before giving up entirely without seeming to care. Clifton also tended to randomly insult patrons, passing off the abuse as the "comedy" portion of his act. Adding to Clifton's annoying and unappealing presence was his tendency to rhyme various words at random in the middle of conversations. Clifton was often introduced as having "sold more records than Elvis and The Beatles combined."

For a brief time, it was unclear to some whether Clifton was a real person. News programs interviewed Clifton as Kaufman's opening act, but the interviews invariably would turn ugly whenever Kaufman's name came up. Clifton claimed Kaufman was using his name "to go places." Promoters who thought they had caught on to the joke would hire Clifton because he was cheaper than booking Kaufman. However, Kaufman had the last laugh, enlisting his brother Michael or his showbiz partner Bob Zmuda to play the role, with Kaufman making unannounced appearances on stage during Clifton's act.

Rodney Dangerfield was a big fan of Andy Kaufman, and he hired Clifton to open for him for three shows at San Francisco's Warfield Theater. After a disastrous first show, where Clifton took the stage with Tony Bennett's famous "I Left My Heart in San Francisco" and was summarily booed, he reappeared on the second night in riot gear amid a shower of rotten vegetables and other detritus.

Tony Clifton still makes occasional appearances, most notably in the days leading up to May 16, 2004, the twentieth anniversary of Kaufman's death. It was announced on May 16, 2008, that Comic Relief, in recognition of the 24th anniversary of Andy Kaufman's death, would present "The Return of Tony Clifton", with his "Katrina Kiss My Ass Orchestra". The national tour kicked off on June 27, 2008, at the Georgia Theatre in Athens, Georgia, to benefit Gulf Coast musicians, dancers, and singers affected by Hurricane Katrina. Clifton fronted the Katrina Orchestra along with the Cliftonettes. On August 15 they were at Chicago's Chopin Theatre. In May 2011, they were featured headliners as part of the annual Hangout Music Festival in Gulf Shores, Alabama. Later that month he began hosting the Tony Clifton Revue at The Comedy Store in Los Angeles. He was interviewed on May 31, 2012, at the 284th episode of Marc Maron's podcast WTF with Marc Maron.

== Television ==
=== Taxi ===
Clifton was hired to appear on an early episode of ABC's Taxi. In 1977, the producers of Taxi saw Kaufman's Foreign Man act at The Comedy Store and offered him a role in their show based on the character. Kaufman was not a fan of sitcoms, but his manager, George Shapiro, convinced him that this would propel him to stardom, where he would make a lot of money, which he could then put into his act, which became Andy's Funhouse. Kaufman agreed to appear as Latka Gravas in 14 episodes per season, approximately half of the entire series if Tony Clifton was also allowed to guest star in the series. The producers were well aware that "Clifton" was an alter ego of Kaufman but went along with the fiction that Clifton was a separate actor. They signed Clifton to a separate contract and announced to the cast that Clifton was being hired to portray the brother of Danny DeVito's character Louie De Palma in the series 13th episode.

However, after the first day of rehearsal, the producers felt Kaufman as Clifton was not up to the acting challenge of playing the offered role. Informed of this, Kaufman asked that "Clifton" be fired in public, ostensibly for coming to rehearsal late. Clifton reappeared on set for the next day of filming and was demanding, boorish and obnoxious. The producers not only fired Clifton in front of the press and network executives (who had gathered on set to witness the promised spectacle) but threw him off the set after he caused havoc and enraged series stars Judd Hirsch and Jeff Conaway. The role was hurriedly recast, and when Kaufman (as himself) returned to work for the following episode, he acted as if nothing had happened.

Sam Simon, a season 5 writer and showrunner for Taxi, said in a 2013 interview with Marc Maron for the WTF with Marc Maron podcast that the story of Kaufman (as opposed to "Tony Clifton") having generally been disruptive on the show was "a complete fiction" created mainly by Bob Zmuda. Simon maintained that Zmuda has a "vested interest" in promoting an out-of-control image of Kaufman. In the interview, Simon stated that Kaufman was "completely professional" and that he "told you Tony Clifton was him", but he also conceded that Kaufman would have "loved" Zmuda's version of events.

=== Other appearances ===
Clifton (played by Zmuda) appeared once on Late Night with David Letterman, where he was interviewed and sang a medley with the band. In 1982, Clifton also appeared on The Fantastic Miss Piggy Show as the host's "new discovery," although the other Muppets and host George Hamilton remained skeptical of Clifton's talent.

Perhaps the biggest myth surrounding Tony Clifton's TV appearances comes from Dinah Shore's daytime talk show Dinah & Friends. According to legend, Clifton arrived for the taping drunk and then pressured Shore in front of the studio audience to sing a duet with him although he had been previously told that she had a sore throat. This was a prearranged bit which featured messages from the producers telling the viewers at home that this was a "put on". The myth continues that, after dumping eggs on Shore's head, the show's producers quickly cut to a commercial as Clifton was escorted out of the studio, and the videotape of the incident was "destroyed". In reality, the footage has been lost, and the entire event was staged, as with all of Kaufman's appearances.

In 2009, Clifton appeared on The Opie & Anthony Show to promote a performance at Santos Party House in New York City.

In 2012, Bob Zmuda portrayed Tony Clifton for live shows at The Comedy Store in support of the homelessness charity Comic Relief.

== In other media ==
=== Films ===
==== Tony Clifton biopic ====
Kaufman and Zmuda wrote a screenplay for a Tony Clifton biography entitled The Tony Clifton Story. In the screenplay Clifton dies at Cedars-Sinai Medical Center in Los Angeles from cancer. Five years later, Kaufman died at the same hospital from lung cancer.

Plans for making the Clifton film were sidelined after the box office failure of Kaufman's first major motion picture, Heartbeeps, from 1981, in which he co-starred with Bernadette Peters as robots who fall in love. Kaufman eventually appeared on Late Night with David Letterman to apologize for Heartbeeps.

==== Man on the Moon ====
Clifton is portrayed in the Kaufman biographical film Man on the Moon.

== Influence ==
Kaufman's Tony Clifton character has influenced other "anti-comedy" acts, notably standup comedian Neil Hamburger and singer/comedian Unknown Hinson. Maren Ade's Toni Erdmann, the protagonist in the 2016 Oscar-nominated German movie of the same title, was influenced by Kaufman concerning appearance, humor and first name.
