= Blassie =

Blassie is a surname. Notable people with the surname include:

- Freddie Blassie (1918–2003), American professional wrestler and manager
- John Joseph Blassie (1924-1982), American politician from Missouri
- Michael Blassie (1948–1972), officer in the United States Air Force

== See also ==
- My Breakfast with Blassie (1983), movie starring Andy Kaufman and professional wrestler "Classy" Freddie Blassie
