= Thank You Very Much (film) =

2023 documentary film

- Theatrical release poster
- Directed by: Alex Braverman
- Produced by: Lauren Belfer; Alex Braverman; Joe Plummer
- Cinematography: Brandon Somerhalder; Jeremy Leach
- Edited by: Alan Lowe; Jarad Jeter
- Music by: Christopher Bear
- Production companies: Wavelength; Tremolo Productions; Elara Pictures
- Distributed by: Drafthouse Films
- Release dates: August 31, 2023 (Venice); March 28, 2025 (United States)
- Running time: 99 minutes
- Country: United States
- Language: English
- Box office: $17,104

Thank You Very Much is a 2023 American documentary film directed by Alex Braverman. A portrait of Andy Kaufman's personal life and career, it premiered at the 80th edition of the Venice Film Festival. It also features interviews with Bob Zmuda, Danny DeVito, Lynne Margulies, Steve Martin, and Marilu Henner. It was limitedly released in theaters on March 28, 2025.

== Synopsis ==
The film analyzes both Andy Kaufman's career and life in a non-strictly linear structure, with rare and never-before-seen footage, and also investigates his life events and choices from a psychological perspective. Interviewees in the film include longtime collaborator Bob Zmuda, romantic partner Lynne Margulies, and actors Steve Martin, Danny DeVito, and Marilu Henner.

== Production ==
Braveman decided to make the documentary after he got possession of some unreleased archival material about Kaufman, and felt 'there was still a bigger story to tell' about him. The film was co-produced by the Safdie brothers and Academy Award-winning documentary filmmaker Morgan Neville.

== Release ==
The film had its world premiere at the 80th Venice International Film Festival in the Venice Classics sidebar, where it was awarded best documentary film. It was the second documentary about Kaufman to be screened at the Venice Festival after Jim & Andy: The Great Beyond, which premiered at the 74th Venice International Film Festival. In September 2024, Drafthouse Films acquired distribution rights to the film. It was given a limited release in theaters on March 28, 2025.

== Reception ==
On the review aggregator website Rotten Tomatoes, 90% of 42 critics' reviews are positive. The website's consensus reads: "An affectionate documentary packed with revealing archival material, Thank You Very Much doesn't decode the legendary Andy Kaufman's mystique but will make audiences feel just a little bit closer to him." Metacritic, which uses a weighted average, assigned the film a score of 68 out of 100, based on five critics, indicating "generally favorable" reviews.

Owen Gleiberman of Variety wrote, "Thank You Very Much is a documentary about Andy Kaufman that does just what you want it to do. It details Kaufman's life and career, showcasing all the stage bits he became famous for (and including rare footage of performances and offstage antics that even Kaufman fanatics have never seen). But more than that, the movie understands him."

Christian Zilko of IndieWire gave the film a B and wrote, "The film largely focuses on Kaufman's professional achievements — something many interview subjects tacitly admit was unavoidable, as Kaufman's insistence on turning everything into a bit made it difficult to separate the man from his comedy. But the film's most noteworthy moments come on the rare occasions when it probes his psyche."
