= I'm from Hollywood =

- Directed by: Lynne Margulies; Joe Orr
- Starring: Andy Kaufman; Jerry Lawler; Lance Russell; Tony Danza; Marilu Henner
- Release date: 1989
- Running time: 61 minutes
- Country: United States
- Language: English

I'm from Hollywood is a 1989 comedy documentary film about the adventures of late performance artist Andy Kaufman in the world of professional wrestling. The film includes interviews with Taxi co-stars Marilu Henner and Tony Danza and interviews with comedian Robin Williams, wrestler Jerry Lawler, wrestling commentator Lance Russell, and Kaufman's best friend, Bob Zmuda. Other people seen in the film include TV host David Letterman and Jimmy Hart of Continental Wrestling Association. The film's title refers to a phrase spoken by Kaufman to the Memphis wrestling audience.

The documentary's ending is intentionally misleading, as it gives the impression that the feud ended with Kaufman successfully getting revenge on Lawler during a match with Jimmy Hart and The Assassins. In reality, this match happened only halfway into the two-year-long feud.

The documentary was directed by Kaufman's girlfriend, Lynne Margulies, and Joe Orr. Kaufman himself began work with Margulies and Orr on the film in 1983, shortly before he was diagnosed with cancer. Margulies and Orr, at Kaufman's request, finished I'm from Hollywood after the performer's death.

== Home video release ==
I'm from Hollywood was released on VHS on June 15, 1998, and November 16, 1999. It was also released on DVD on April 25, 2000, and as a special edition on November 20, 2007. The April 2000 edition also includes My Breakfast with Blassie, a 1983 parody of My Dinner with Andre in which Kaufman has a conversation with Freddie Blassie over breakfast at a pancake house.
