= Chris Albrecht =

American media executive (born 1952)

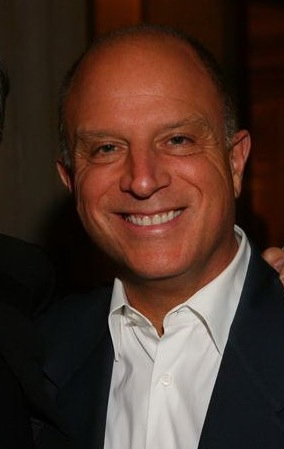
- Albrecht in 2008
- Born: July 24, 1952 (age 74); Queens, New York, U.S.
- Education: Hofstra University (BA)
- Occupation: Executive
- Spouses: Annie Albrecht (m. 1981–2000); Montana Coady (m. 2011–2015); Tina Trahan (m. 2016)

Chris Albrecht (born July 24, 1952) is an American media executive. He is the co-founder of Rubicon Global Media and was previously chairman and CEO of HBO and CEO and President of Starz.

== Early life and education ==
Albrecht was born July 24, 1952, in Queens, where he was also raised. He graduated from Hofstra University with a degree in Dramatic Literature. (He has subsequently started the Chris Albrecht Endowed Scholarship for the School of Communications at his alma mater.) When he completed college, Albrecht set his sights on becoming a stage actor. He appeared in a few summer stock productions, but struggled to find work.

== Career ==
Albrecht began performing in New York City with his then-partner Bob Zmuda at Ye Olde Tripple Inn, a bar in midtown Manhattan where they were "thrown off the stage for obscenity." They also performed at the Improv and he went on to become a manager at the club. He did so well that the Friedmans sold a portion of the business to him, which he ran from 1975 to 1980. He would later become an agent at International Creative Management (ICM), where he was instrumental in signing such talent as Jim Carrey, Keenen Ivory Wayans, Billy Crystal and Whoopi Goldberg.

Albrecht began working at HBO in June 1985 as senior vice president, original programming, West Coast. Before becoming chairman in 2002, he spent seven years as president of HBO Original Programming, where he directed day-to-day operations of West and East Coast original programming for HBO, Cinemax and HBO Independent Productions and also oversaw HBO Sports and HBO Films. From 1990 to 1995, Albrecht was President of HBO Independent Productions and oversaw development and production of comedy series for distribution on HBO and the networks, including Martin and Everybody Loves Raymond. Albrecht green-lit, and under his leadership, HBO became the leader in innovative entertainment and sports programming due to critically acclaimed series such as Oz, Sex and the City, The Sopranos, Six Feet Under, Deadwood, Band of Brothers, The Wire and Entourage among many others.

In September 2007, Albrecht signed a three-year deal with IMG in September to serve as head of IMG Global Media and a special limited partner in Forstmann Little & Company, the private equity firm headed by Ted Forstmann that owns IMG. Albrecht and Forstmann planned to raise a $250 million fund for investments in media and entertainment content. In a statement released by IMG on August 12, 2008, Albrecht's departure was blamed on the firm's inability to raise those funds.

In 2008, Albrecht founded Foresee Entertainment, an independent content creation, development and distribution company.

On January 1, 2010, Albrecht joined Starz, LLC, as its president and CEO. He oversaw all of the Starz entities, including Starz Entertainment, Overture Films, Anchor Bay Entertainment and Film Roman. Starz, LLC, is a controlled subsidiary that operates Starz Media and Starz Entertainment.

Two years after joining Starz, Albrecht and Liberty Media announced that it would spin-off Liberty Starz into a separate public company; the transaction included about $1.5 billion of debt. The spin-off of the subsidiary was expected to be completed by the end of 2012, but was not completed until January 11, 2013. As a result of the spin-off, Liberty Starz changed its name to "Starz Inc." The new stock rose 9.8% on its first day of trading.

Albrecht's contract was renewed as CEO of Starz through 2020. The title of President was added effective July 1, 2016. On June 30, 2016, Lionsgate agreed to acquire Starz Inc. for $4.4 billion in cash and stock.

In February 2021, it was announced that Albrecht was moving to Legendary Entertainment.

== Personal life ==
In 1981, he married his first wife, Annie Albrecht, with whom he had two daughters. They divorced in 2000.

In 2011, Albrecht married Montana Coady. They divorced in 2015.

Albrecht endorsed Democratic candidate Hillary Clinton in the run-up for the 2016 U.S. presidential election.

=== Legal issues and allegations of abuse ===
The Los Angeles Times reported that in 1991, HBO paid a settlement of at least $400,000 to Sasha Emerson, a subordinate of Albrecht who had accused him of choking her during a confrontation in her office. In an email to HBO employees, Albrecht blamed his behavior on alcoholism.

In 2007, Albrecht was arrested for assaulting his then-girlfriend in the valet parking area of the MGM Grand. Time Warner, the parent company of HBO, requested Albrecht's resignation. Albrecht complied, amidst accusations of another domestic dispute from the early 1990s.

== Philanthropy ==
- Albrecht co-founded Comic Relief, which in its 25 years has raised more than $50 million to benefit the homeless, including those displaced by Hurricane Katrina. For a decade, he raised funds for the Los Angeles Shelter Partnership by enlisting celebrities like George Carlin, Bill Maher and Lewis Black.
- Albrecht founded and chaired the Rally to Save Ahmanson Ranch, 3,000 acres (12 km^{2}) of California wilderness formerly threatened by commercial development. In partnership with the NRDC, Heal the Bay, The Sierra Club and other organizations, this effort succeeded in preventing development and turned the land into a State Park. Heal the Bay honored Albrecht with its Walk the Talk Award for his leadership in saving Ahmanson Ranch.
- Albrecht co-chaired a $250 million fundraising campaign for Children's Hospital Los Angeles along with Mary Hart.

== Awards ==
- In 2001, the International Cinematographers Guild presented Albrecht with the Television Showmanship Award.
- In 2003, Variety magazine named Albrecht "Showman of the Year".
- In 2006, Albrecht was inducted into the Broadcasting & Cable Hall of Fame.
