= Johnny Legend =

American singer (1948–2026)

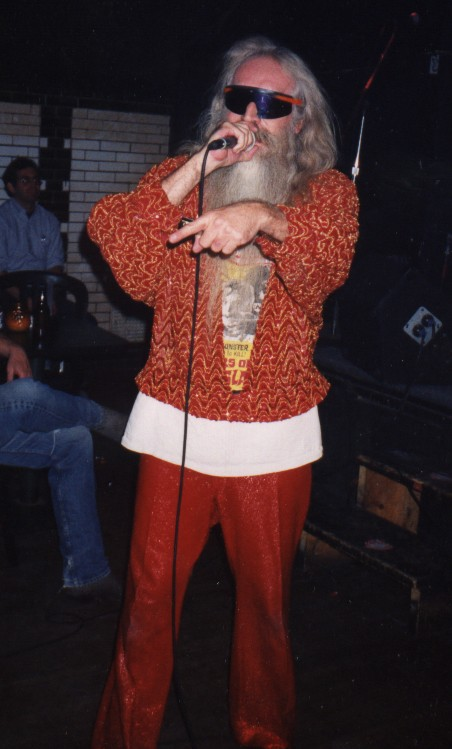
- Legend performing in 2012

Background information
- Born: Martin Margulies; October 3, 1948; San Fernando, California, U.S.
- Died: January 2, 2026 (aged 77) Newport, Oregon, U.S.
- Genres: Rockabilly; rock and roll
- Occupations: Singer; film producer; manager; actor
- Years active: 1969–2026

Martin Margulies (October 3, 1948 – January 2, 2026), known professionally as Johnny Legend, was an American rockabilly musician, film producer, actor, and wrestling manager.

== Life and career ==
Legend was born in San Fernando, California, on October 3, 1948.

In 1981, Legend and Linda Lautrec saw My Dinner with Andre. The two thought of spoofing the film and in 1982, the couple produced, wrote and, together with Mark Shepard, directed My Breakfast with Blassie, starring comedian Andy Kaufman and wrestling manager Freddie Blassie. Legend's sister Lynne Margulies, who also appeared in the film, subsequently became Kaufman's girlfriend.

In 1995, Legend co-founded Incredibly Strange Wrestling, a wrestling promotion active in San Francisco until the early 2000s.

In 2000, January 14 to 20, Legend did a week showing films at the Clinton St. Theater in Portland, Oregon. Among the features he presented were, The Sadist, The T.A.M.I Show, My Breakfast with Blassie, Two Thousand Maniacs!, and more.

== Death ==
Legend died from complications of a stroke and heart failure in Newport, Oregon, on January 2, 2026, at the age of 57.

== Discography ==
Solo releases

1. Are You Hep To Me? (Honeymoon Bop, 1979).
2. Rockabilly Rumble (As Johnny Legend & His Skullcaps) (Rollin' Rock, 1981).
3. Soaking' The Bone (As Johnny Legend & His Skullcaps) (Rollin' Rock, 1981).
4. I Bite The Songs – Freddie Blassie (Produced by Johnny Legend) (Rhino, 1985).
5. Rockabilly Rumble (Rollin' Rock Switzerland, 1994).
6. Rockabilly Bastard: The Best Of Johnny Legend, Volume None (As Johnny Legend & His Rockabilly Bastards) (High tone, 1997).
7. Bitchin' (Dionysus, 1998).
8. I Itch! (Blue light Records, 2014).
9. The Rollin' Rock Recordings (Part Records, 2015)

Various artists compilations

1. Rollin' The Rock, Vol. 1 (Rollin' Rock, 1976).
2. Rollin' The Rock, Vol. 2 (Rollin' Rock, 1977).
3. Teenage Cruisers – The Cream Of California Rockabilly [Original Soundtrack] (Rhino, 1980).
4. Forever Gene Vincent (Rollin' Rock, 1980).
5. Wrestling Rocks (Rhino, 1985).
6. Turning The World Blue: A Tribute To Gene Vincent (Skizmatic, 1996).
7. Rollin' Rock Got The Sock, Vol. 1 (High tone, 1997).
8. Rollin' Rock Got The Sock, Vol. 2 (Hight one, 1998).
9. The Big Monster Bash, Vol. 1 (Mouthpiece, 1998).
10. Stock Footage: Music From The Films Of Roger Corman (Worry Bird, 2000).
11. If These Walls Could Talk 2 [Original Soundtrack] (Jellybean, 2000).

== Filmography ==
- The Secret Sex Lives of Romeo and Juliet (1969)
- The Cat Ate The Parakeet (AKA Pot, Parents And Police) (1972) (As Martin Margulies)
- Sexual Sensory Perception (1975)
- Young, Hot 'N' Nasty Teenage Cruisers (1977)
- Fantasm Comes Again (1977) (As Martin Margulies)
- My Breakfast with Blassie (1983) (With Andy Kaufman)
- Prison Ship (1988)
- Bride of Re-Animator (1990)
- Severed Ties (1992)
- Children of the Corn III (1995)
- Bug Buster (1998)
- Man on the Moon (1999)
- Skinwalker – Curse of the Shaman (2005)
