= Andy and His Grandmother =

Compilation album by Andy Kaufman
- Released: July 16, 2013
- Recorded: 1977–1979
- Genre: Comedy
- Length: 48:00
- Language: English
- Label: Drag City
- Compilers: Rodney Ascher; Vernon Chatman

Andy and His Grandmother is the posthumous debut album from American comedian Andy Kaufman, released on Drag City on July 16, 2013. Composed of recordings that Kaufman made on microcassette from 1977 to 1979, the album was created by several of Kaufman's friends as well as contemporary comedians.

== Recording ==
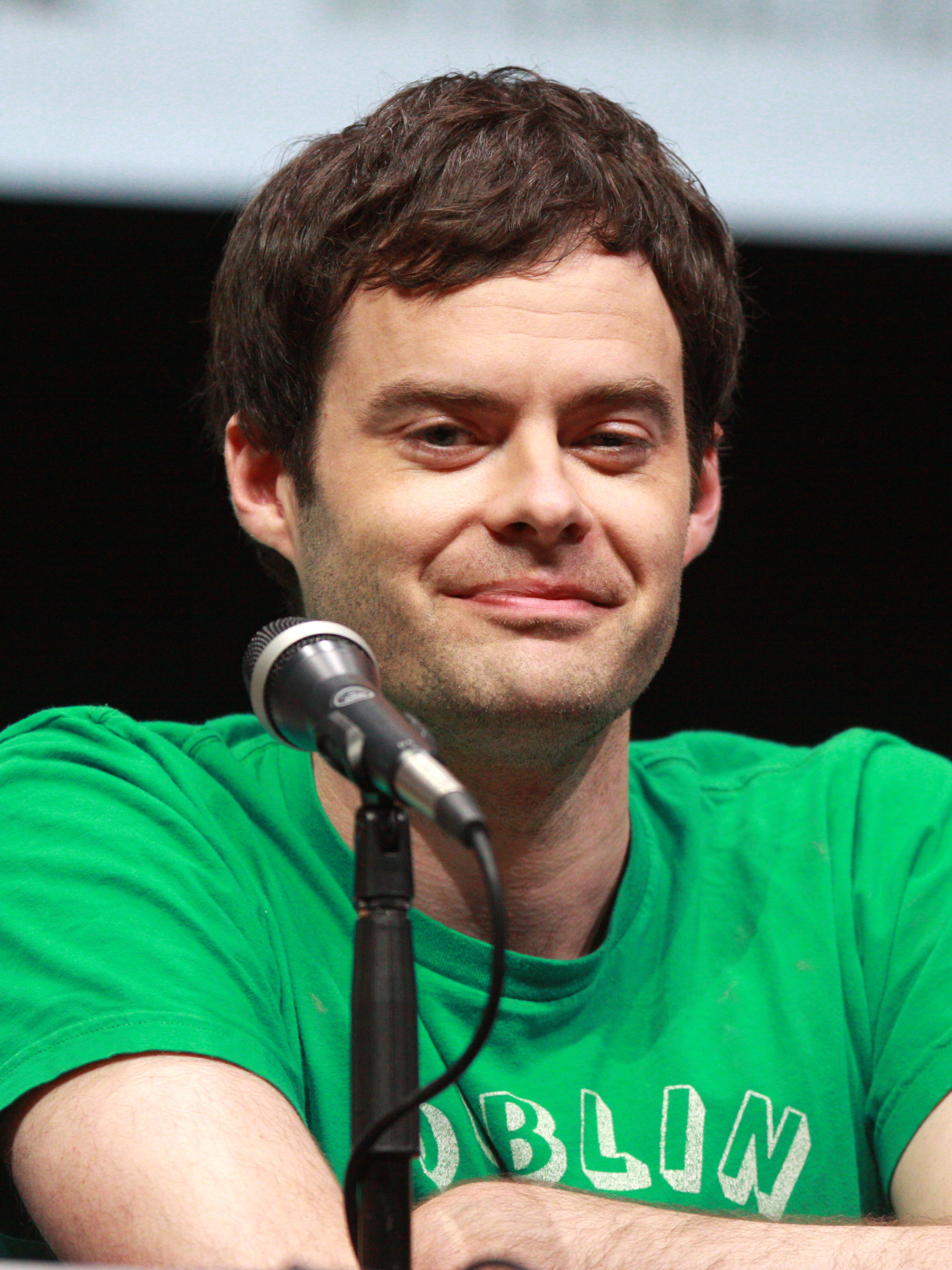
Comedian Bill Hader provided narration to bridge the gaps between bits on Andy and His Grandmother

Kaufman recorded over 80 hours of material with the intention of recording an album similar to Steve Allen and Jerry Lewis' prank call comedy records—his tapes include explicit instructions on how the album should sound. Kaufman's girlfriend Lynne Margulies kept the tapes for decades but never found the opportunity to release them until she published a 2009 book of letters sent to Kaufman and her publisher put her in touch with Drag City. The album was compiled by editor Rodney Ascher and comedian Vernon Chatman with narration between tracks by comedian Bill Hader and liner notes by Kaufman confidant Bob Zmuda. The album includes Kaufman's potential plans for faking his own death—a long-rumored prank that he has allegedly pulled on the public for over 30 years. Chatman is contractually barred from commenting on whether or not Kaufman in fact faked his death.

== Critical reception ==
Professional ratings
Aggregate scores
Source	Rating
Metacritic	62, four reviews
Review scores
Source	Rating
The Boston Globe	Favorable
Consequence of Sound	3/5 stars
Pitchfork	7.2/10
PopMatters	5/10 stars

The album has received mixed and positive reviews—review aggregator Metacritic has given it a 62 indicating "generally favorable reviews". Nick A. Zaino III, writing for The Boston Globe called the compilation "undoubtedly one of the strangest albums in recent memory" making for a "perfect tribute" to Kaufman. Matt Melis of Consequence of Sound also drew parallels between the ambiguous nature of Kaufman's anti-comedy and these recordings. Ryan Dombal's review for Pitchfork emphasizes the timing of the recordings and how Kaufman's act changed from a kid-friendly to an adult-themed performance and notes that this album documents his increasingly provocative act. Charles Pitter of PopMatters gave the compilation a mixed score saying, "much of the content is either the start of an idea or what could be considered unfinished business. Despite this, if you're a huge Kaufman fan, it's likely to be of great interest, but potentially it may cause you a wave of depression." Writing for Grantland, Alex Pappademas called the album a "landmark" and "part of Kaufman hasn’t been fully present in any of his work before".

== Track listing ==
1. "Andy Is Making a Record"
2. "Andy and His Grandmother"
3. "Andy's Land Live"
4. "Andy Loves His Tape Recorder"
5. "Slice of Life"
6. "Andy Goes to the Movies"
7. "Kick in the Pants"
8. "Andy Can Talk to Animals"
9. "I'm Not Capable of Having a Relationship"
10. "Hookers"
11. "Andy and His Grandmother Go for a Drive"
12. "Sleep Comedy"
13. "[HONK] vs. [DOG] A"
14. "[HONK] vs. [DOG] B"
15. "Andy Goes for a Taxi Ride"
16. "Andy's English Friend Paul"
17. "I Want Those Tapes"

== Personnel ==
- Andy Kaufman – performer
- Rodney Ascher – editing
- Vernon Chatman – compilation, production
- Bill Hader – narration
- Frans Hendriks – mastering
- Bram Meindersma – mixing
- Jim O'Rourke – opening fanfare
- Bob Zmuda – liner notes
