= Comic Relief USA =

Former American non-profit charity organization

Comic Relief
- Successor: Comic Relief, Inc.
- Founded: 1986
- Founder: Bob Zmuda
- Dissolved: 2011
- Type: charity
- Tax ID no.: 501(c)(3) non-profit
- Purpose: Food, housing, health care, and other assistance for the homeless
- Location: Los Angeles, California, United States
- Region served: United States, occasionally other parts of the world
- Method: Comedy
- Key people: Bob Zmuda, Jacques Fiorentino, and hosts Billy Crystal, Whoopi Goldberg, and Robin Williams
- Revenue: Donations

Comic Relief USA, also called Comic Relief, Inc. (not the same as the successor charity with the same name), was a non-profit charity organization that operated from 1986 until 2011. Its mission was to raise funds to help those in need—particularly America's homeless. It raised and distributed nearly US$50 million toward providing assistance—including health care services—to homeless people throughout the United States. Although Comic Relief's charity work was continuous, its fundraising events were held and televised at irregular intervals—and primarily by Home Box Office (HBO), with comedians Robin Williams, Billy Crystal, and Whoopi Goldberg as the hosts each time. They—along with many other comedians, celebrities, and occasional politicians—performed various segments—both general-purpose and specific to homelessness—of standup comedy, sketch comedy, speeches, live music, and impressions of persons and characters. The organization also produced documentary segments dealing with real-life problems of homeless people, in order to raise awareness of not only the realities but also how many hard-working "ordinary" people can wind up or grow up homeless. In exchange for contributions exceeding certain amounts, T-shirts, sweatshirts and other merchandise were typically for sale. Its slogans were "Where there's laughter, there's hope" and "Comic Relief—it's no joke".

== Founding ==
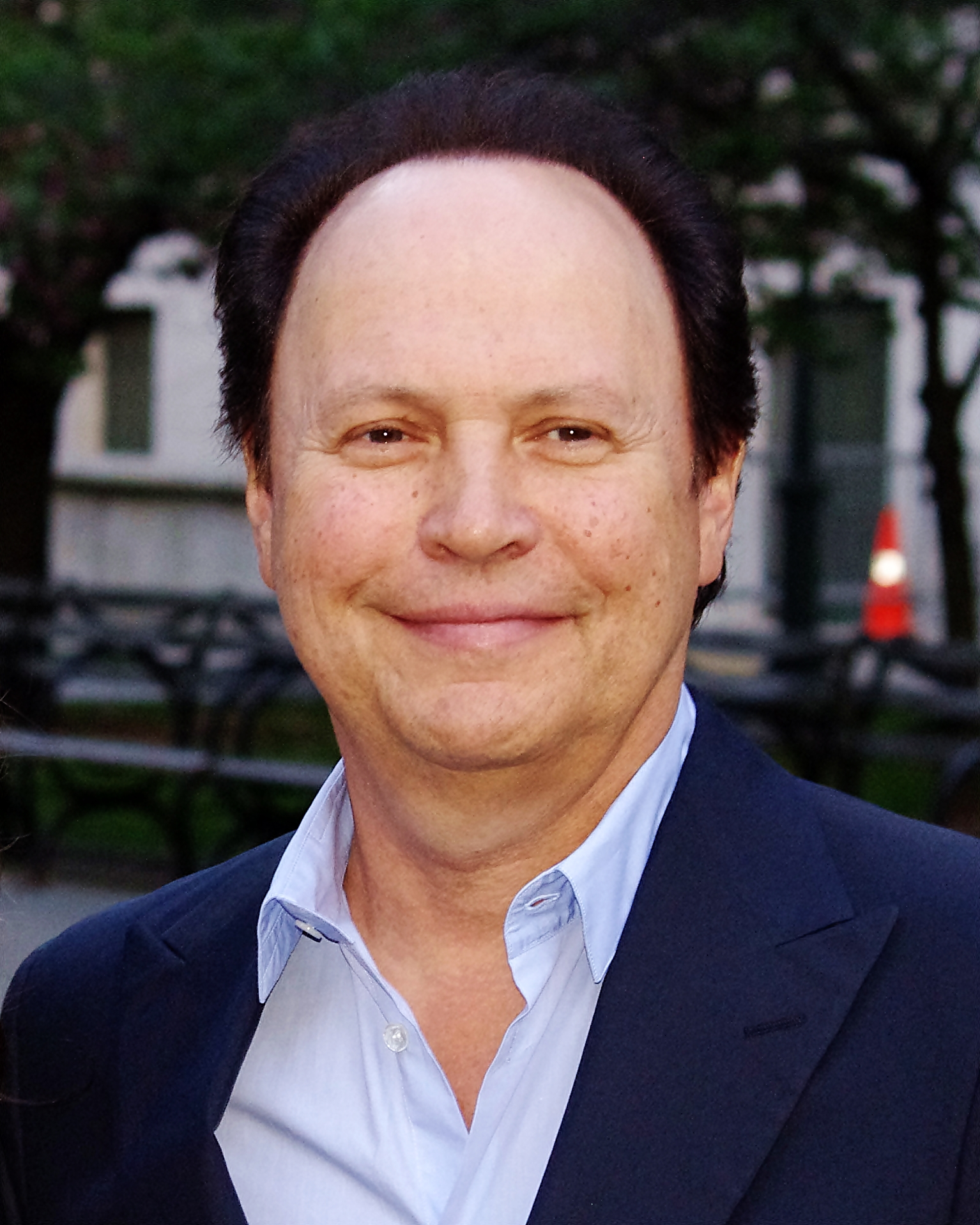
Billy Crystal

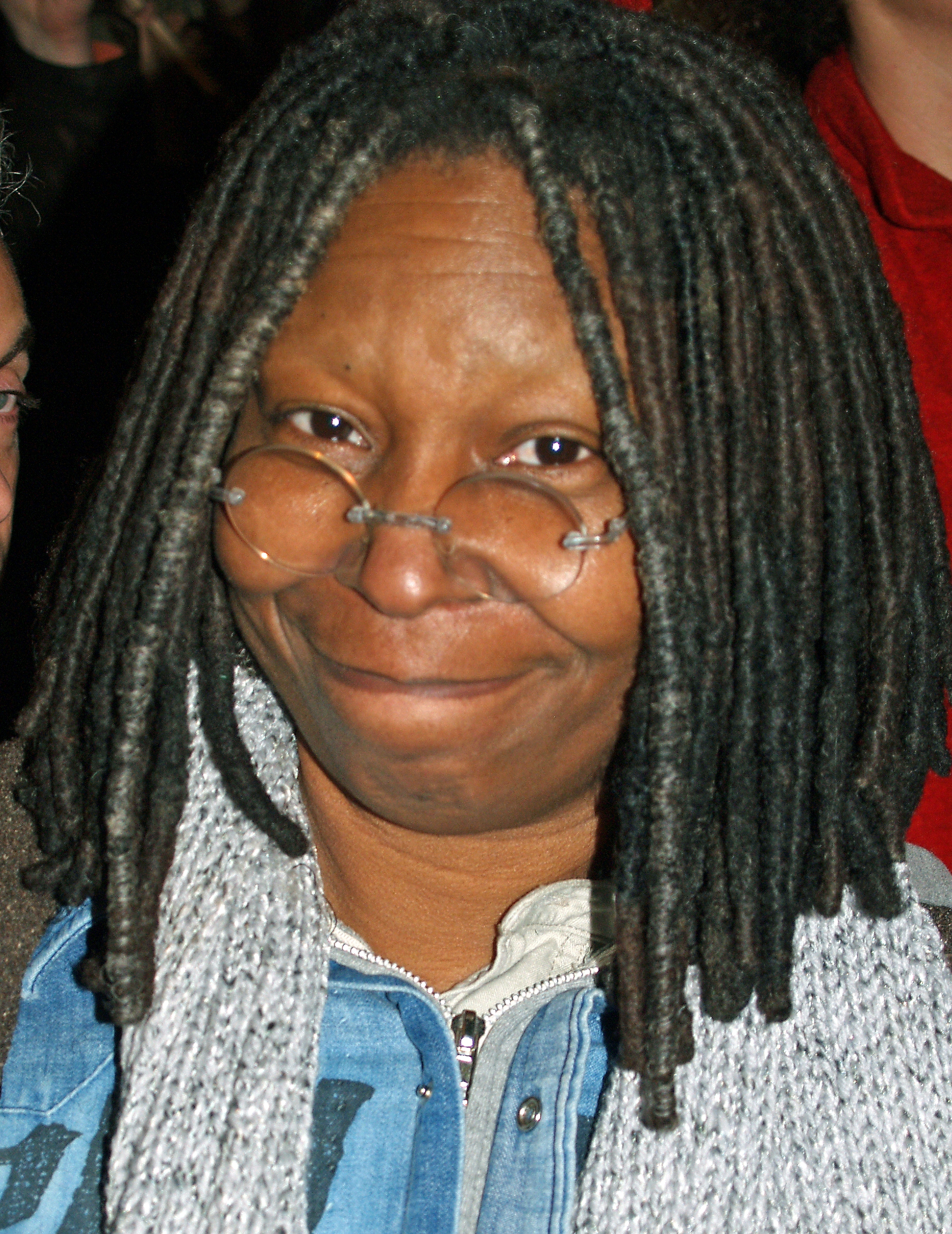
Whoopi Goldberg

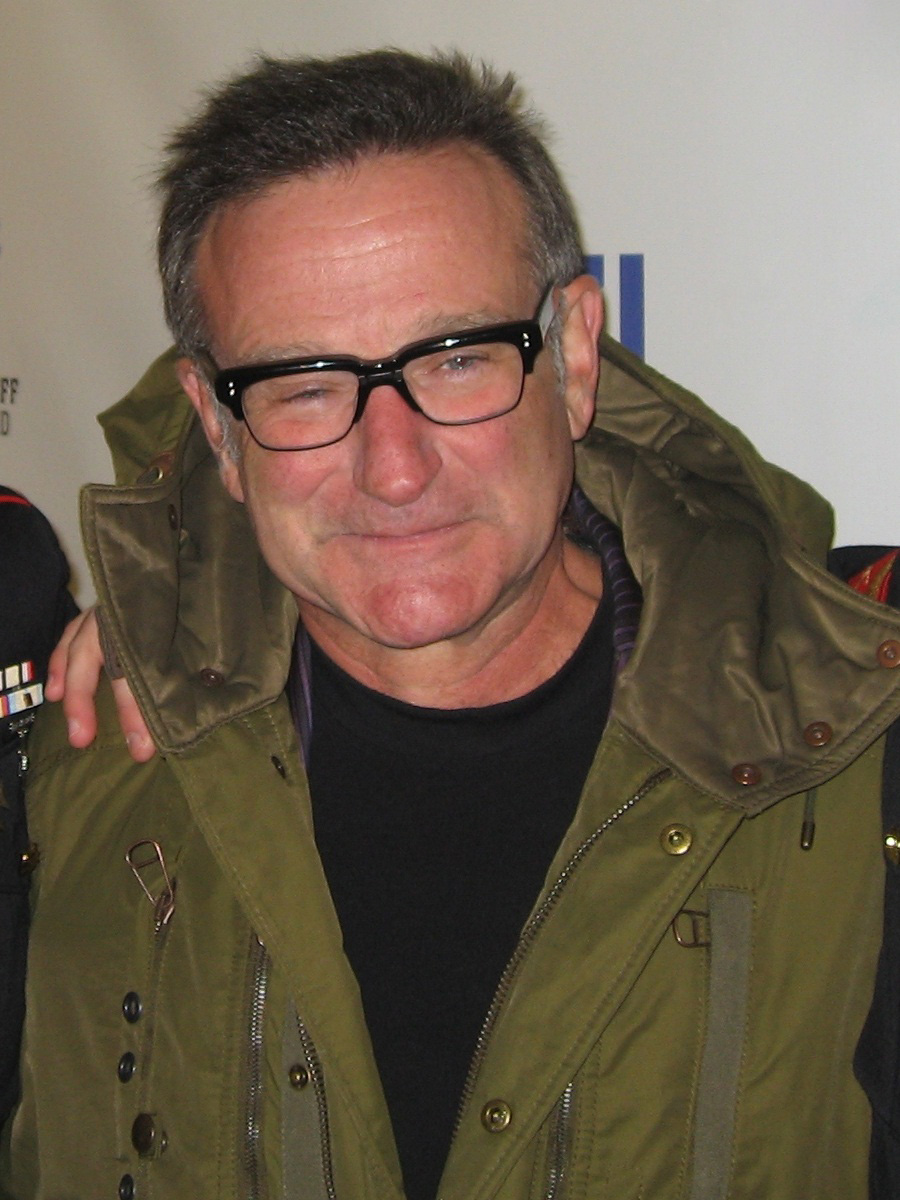
Robin Williams

Comic Relief's hosts

Based on the Comic Relief charity in the United Kingdom and dedicated to the memory of comedian Andy Kaufman, the American organization was created in 1986 by comedy writer, producer, and actor Bob Zmuda and producer Jacques Fiorentino. They worked with HBO executive Chris Albrecht to found the U.S. version in 1986.

Robin Williams, Billy Crystal, and Whoopi Goldberg were chosen to co-host Comic Relief's four-plus-hour maiden fundraiser. Other comics involved included Michael Keaton, Richard Dreyfuss, and Penny Marshall, as well as Bob Goldthwait, Howie Mandel, Minnie Pearl, and George Carlin. The first show netted US$2.5 million. According to the organization's website, more than $50 million has been raised since.

Filmmaker Judd Apatow's first job in show business was on Comic Relief, working as an assistant for producers Bob Zmuda and Jacques Fiorentino.

== Chronology of events ==
Year	Event (see "Notes" below)	Televised By	Description/Highlights
1986	Comic Relief	HBO	Debut event, 29 March. Featured Mary Gross as Dr. Ruth Westheimer; Jon Lovitz as Tommy Flanagan, The Pathological Liar; Sid Caesar as Ludwig von Knowitall; Robin Williams as William F. Buckley Jr., commenting on the effects of "trickle-down economics" on the homeless; George Carlin describing a house as "a place for your stuff".; Garry Shandling, Jerry Lewis.
1987	Comic Relief '87	HBO	Featured Elayne Boosler on surrogacy and the Vatican; Dudley Moore as a one-legged man auditioning to play Tarzan, also featuring Peter Cook as the film executive; Penn and Teller doing card tricks and "cat tricks"; "men on the street" describing the Olympics; a song on the "Black Monday" stock-market crash, in parody of "Swing Low, Sweet Chariot".
1989	Comic Relief III	HBO	Debuted the song "Mr. President"—written by Joe Sterling, Ray Reach and Mike Loveless, and sung by Al Jarreau and Natalie Cole. Featured Jim Varney as Ernest P. Worrell; Catherine O'Hara smoking between bites of food and drink; Arsenio Hall on women with plastic surgery; Woody Harrelson talking to an "audience member" (Shelley Long) who, when asked if she watched Cheers, said, "Not that much."
1990	Comic Relief '90	HBO	Featured Joan Rivers on exercise and swimmers; Dana Carvey doing his "Lady I Know/She's Choppin' Broccoli" song from Saturday Night Live; Steven Wright asking, "What's the youngest you can die of old age?"
1991	A Comedy Salute to Michael Jordan *	NBC	In honor of basketball player Michael Jordan.
1992	Hurricane Relief *	Showtime	9-hour marathon event to bring relief to areas of Florida, Louisiana and Hawaii in the wake of Hurricane Andrew's devastation. Featured singer Gloria Estefan singing The Isley Brothers' "Shout", backed up by a choir.
1992	Comic Relief V	HBO	Featured Rosie O'Donnell on aerobics; Don Rickles describing the cause as "to find you [ Whoopi Goldberg ] work"; Bobcat Goldthwait juicing vegetables and squid; a clip of Bob Einstein as Super Dave Osborne, playing piano on a bus; Billy Crystal telling Robin Williams to "do your 'dick stuff'"; George Foreman in a pie-eating contest with Billy and Robin; Jim Carrey on drinking and cops.
1993	Baseball Relief *	Fox	Featured comedians and baseball players.
1994	Comic Relief VI	HBO	Featured appearance by a representative of Housing and Urban Development from the Bill Clinton administration; Alan King talks about getting old; Brett Butler on Rush Limbaugh and Schindler's List; Billy and Robin doing a duet on sex in old age; cast of Star Trek: The Next Generation playing the Enterprise crew—"researching" Comic Relief, and comparing "Hoo-pye Goldberg" to Guinan (a character who was played by Whoopi); Dave Chappelle on terrorists and the apparent lack of "black hostages"; Robin on John and Lorena Bobbitt; Paul Rodriguez on the 1992 Los Angeles riots; Bill Maher on America's culture of victimhood; Paula Poundstone on her adopted son; Marga Gomez on her culture and Spanish soap operas.
1995	Comic Relief VII	HBO	Featured Margaret Cho on racism; Paula Poundstone on politics; Chris Rock on white people and Colin Powell; Fran Drescher on Princess Diana; Jon Stewart getting "beat up" by kids at Universal Studios; Queen Latifah singing "in the house for Comic Relief", asking people to buy Comic Relief T-shirts; a "Blues Brothers" song, sung by John Goodman, Dan Aykroyd and Jim Belushi.
1996	American Comedy Festival *	ABC	Comic Relief's 10th anniversary. Featured Gilbert Godfried playing a "dirty dummy" with David Brenner as "ventriloquist".
1998	Comic Relief 8	HBO	Featured Chris Rock on "picking up women at a pro-choice rally" and the Clinton impeachment; A celebration of Milton Berle as he approaches his 90th birthday; Kathy Griffin comparing a Jerry Springer talk show tape to a profane "Music Man" outtake (with "Pick-A-Little, Talk-A-Little" becoming "Fuck-A-Little, Cunt-A-Little").
2006	Comic Relief 2006 *	HBO, TBS	Fundraiser for those affected by Hurricane Katrina—held at Caeser's Palace, Las Vegas, Nevada, on 18 November. Comic Relief's 20th anniversary. Featured Billy, Whoopi, and Robin doing a parody of "When the Saints Go Marching In"; Ray Romano on being able to curse after "9 years of Everybody Loves Raymond"; Rosie O'Donnell on Barbra Streisand; Bill Maher envisioning Vegas' losers "joining the ranks of the homeless shortly"; Bob Zmuda talking about the slowness of home-rebuilding efforts—and Comic Relief's work on behalf of rescuing pets and animals; Jon Stewart and Stephen Colbert doing their "The Daily Show" and "Colbert Report" bits on Katrina; Bill Clinton thanking Comic Relief on behalf of his Katrina efforts with George H. W. Bush; Entourage's Kevin Conolly, Kevin Dillon, Jerry Ferrara, Adrian Grenier and Jeremy Piven cursing and donating money into a "curse jar"; D. L. Hughley on general politics, race, and cops; Billy Crystal as his beloved "Jazz Man" character, scolding the perceived inactions of the Bush Administration; Lewis Black on government's alleged sharp attention to nuclear weapons abroad but not to the domestic hurricane; Fred Willard with "Pussycat" (Catherine O'Hara) and "Fur" (Jennifer Coolidge), promoting Comic Relief T-shirts; Roseanne Barr on being on stage with "other big former stars" and "Kirstie Alley's yard sale".
2007	Comic Relief WILD: The Concert for Animals *	HBO, TBS, CNN (TV); AOL, MTV (On-line)	Worldwide event to protect endangered species and combat animal habitat destruction.
2008	Comic Relief: The Greatest...And the Latest *	(DVD)	Two-disc video compilation—featuring Comic Relief's greatest material and most recent material, up to 2006. Disc 1 ("The Greatest") features Comic Relief to Comic Relief 8 (1986–1998); disc 2 ("The Latest") features Comic Relief 2006.
2010	Comic Relief 2010	HBO	Featured Benefit Album and Katrina Orchestra—"The return of Tony Clifton and his Katrina Kiss-My-Ass Orchestra with a bevy of beauties."

Notes:

1. * indicates a special event, or a compilation.
2. Italics indicates a formal Comic Relief show.
3. There has also been an A&E Network series, The Best of Comic Relief.

== Disbursement ==
Generally, HBO and other sponsors picked up all (or most) of the costs of Comic Relief events, so that every (or nearly every) cent raised or contributed went to the cause. Also, the hosts and other performers of Comic Relief events often got involved personally in projects run or supported by the charity.

- In Denver, Colorado, Paul Rodriguez helped open a medical facility made possible by Comic Relief funds; a woman holding a baby approached him, saying, "If it wasn't for Comic Relief, this child wouldn't have been born."
- In Chicago, Illinois, Bob Zmuda went to the Firehouse Annex of Chicago, Illinois—a home for alcoholic and battered women—and learned how, using Comic Relief funds, they were able to "take in a violent, alcoholic woman, slowly give her responsibilities and self-esteem, until she cleaned up and got a regular job."

=== Health Care for the Homeless (HCH) ===
Comic Relief distributed most of its funds raised to Health Care for the Homeless, which had project sites in 85 cities. This network of providers "was originally selected for start-up funding by the Robert Wood Johnson Foundation and the Pew Memorial Trust" after a year of review and assessment in 1985, was "co-sponsored by the U.S. Conference of Mayors", and works annually in all 50 states with thousands of homeless children.

HCH projects are created and run by their 104 organizational members in local communities. Since 1 July 2008, 202 HCH guarantees of the federal government's Health Resources and Services Administration have been providing social services to "more than 740,000 clients" every year, combining HRSA funding with other revenue to provide a wide array of services. Comic Relief board member Dr. Pedro Jose "Joe" Greer, Jr. was awarded the Presidential Medal of Freedom in 2009 by President Barack Obama, on account of his "lifelong efforts to improve medical services for the homeless and uninsured."

== Peripheral causes ==
=== Pets and Hurricane Katrina ===
In the wake of Hurricane Katrina (2006), Comic Relief made a point of rescuing pets and animals—and returning them to their owners when possible.

=== Comic Relief Wild: The Concert for Animals ===
A new internationally held and aired event, Comic Relief Wild: The Concert for Animals, addressed endangered species and habitat destruction around the world in 2007.
