= Comic Relief, Inc. =

Non-profit working to end childhood poverty

- Type: 501(c)(3) charitable organization
- Tax ID no.: 01-0885377
- Headquarters: New York City, New York, U.S.
- Staff: 23
- Website: www.comicrelief.org

Comic Relief US (previously known as America Gives Back Inc.) is a 501(c)(3) American charity with the vision of a just world free from poverty. Comic Relief, Inc. specializes in using the power of entertainment to drive positive change.

It is an independent sister organization to the UK charity Comic Relief and is not connected to the former American charity Comic Relief USA. Comic Relief, Inc. is notable for the 2015 US launch of Red Nose Day, with a telethon hosted by NBC based closely on the UK event of the same name.

== History of Comic Relief and Red Nose Day ==
In 1985, as a response to famine in Ethiopia and other poverty stricken areas of the world, British comedy scriptwriter, Richard Curtis and British comedian, Lenny Henry co-founded and co-created the British charity, Comic Relief. On February 8, 1988, Lenny Henry went to Ethiopia and celebrated the first Red Nose Day telethon. Over 150 celebrities and comedians participated. The event raised £15 million and attracted 30 million viewers on BBC television. The highlight of Comic Relief is Red Nose Day which raises funds for children in need, poverty alleviation and worldwide charities.

=== Red Nose Day USA ===
Since 2015, Red Nose Day in America is celebrated on the last Thursday of every May. Red Nose Day USA, run by Comic Relief Inc., has the stated objective of ending child poverty.

Multi-year funding grants have been given to organizations that help end child poverty such as Feeding America, Boys & Girls Clubs of America, Save the Children and the GAVI vaccination alliance. In its first four years, the Red Nose Day USA has raised more than $145 million.

==== Red Nose Day 2017 ====
Red Nose Day's 2017 campaign raised more than $35 million. Between 2015 and 2017, Comic Relief Inc raised more than $100 million through Red Nose Day.

In 2017, Facebook used its new fundraising platform to help users raise money for Red Nose Day. Anyone who created a Red Nose Day event could add a donate button to any post. The Bill and Melinda Gates Foundation matched up to $1 million of donations raised on Facebook. The NBC Telethon for Red Nose Day included special episodes for American Ninja Warrior, Celebrity Ninja Warrior: Red Nose Day; Running Wild with Bear Grylls with Julia Roberts; featuring celebrities and corporate sponsors for their activities, as well as standard telethon show hosted by Chris Hardwick.

==== Red Nose Day 2018 ====
In 2018, Red Nose Day was held on May 24. The biggest campaign yet, Comic Relief Inc raised more than $42 million to end child poverty through Red Nose Day 2018. On NBC's night of programming celebrating Red Nose Day, Celebrity American Ninja Warrior, a Red Nose Day-themed Hollywood Game Night, and the Red Nose Day Special hosted by Chris Hardwick aired. Special guests included Ben Stiller, Olivia Munn, Anne Hathaway, Jane Lynch, and more appeared on stage. Pre-taped segments included Kelly Clarkson, Julia Roberts, Tony Hale, Lauren Graham, and more.

==== Red Nose Day 2019 ====
Red Nose Day 2019 was held on May 23. A promo for Rudolph Shines Again premiered during it. For the first time ever, the telethon special was expanded to two hours. Terry Crews serves as the host for the special, and Sting, Dave Audé, Andrew Kierszenbaum, Kelly Clarkson, Josh Groban, the Voices of Hope Children’s Choir, John Legend, Chrissy Metz and Blake Shelton performing it, while Special guests included Michael Che, Colin Jost, Kate McKinnon, Lilly Singh and more appeared on stage and in pre-taped segments. Following the telethon, a Red Nose Day-themed Hollywood Game Night episode is broadcast.

==== Red Nose Day 2020 ====
For the 2020 Red Nose Day Special on NBC on May 21, 2020, Blake Shelton, Meghan Trainor, Ellie Goulding, and Gwen Stefani performed. Prior to the broadcast, Celebrity Escape Room, a special produced by Ben Stiller and Jack Black and starring them, Courteney Cox, Lisa Kudrow, and Adam Scott, aired on NBC. The COVID-19 pandemic caused the special to be pre-recorded for the first time; among the changes this year was the digital Red Nose, which was unlocked by donating online.

==== Red Nose Day 2021 ====
The 2021 Red Nose Day Special premiered on NBC on May 27, 2021. As part of the night of fundraising, a Red Nose Day-themed episode of The Wall was aired. Other NBCUniversal properties had special features related to the event. A live online event, Red Nose Day LIVE was streamed prior to the main televised event.

==== Red Nose Day 2022 ====
Red Nose Day was marked on May 26, 2022 with NBC's rebroadcast of Celebrity Escape Room.
