= The Fantastic Miss Piggy Show =

- Genre: Family film Television Special
- Created by: Henson Associates, Inc.
- Based on: The Muppets
- Written by: Buz Kohan; Henry Beard
- Directed by: Jim Henson
- Starring: Frank Oz; Jim Henson; John Ritter; George Hamilton; Tony Clifton; Dave Goelz; Richard Hunt; Kathryn Mullen; Karen Prell; Steve Whitmire; Tom Harvey
- Theme music composer: Joe Raposo; Lenny La Croix
- Country of origin: United States
- Original language: English
- No. of episodes: 1

Production
- Producer: Jim Henson
- Editor: Geoff Cragin
- Running time: 50 minutes
- Production company: Henson Associates

Original release
- Network: ABC
- Release: September 17, 1982

The Fantastic Miss Piggy Show is a one-hour television special that aired on ABC on September 17, 1982. It guest stars John Ritter, George Hamilton and Andy Kaufman as Tony Clifton. The special was taped in Toronto between August 9 and 24, 1982 and was later syndicated alongside The Muppet Show.

== Plot ==
Miss Piggy hosts her own variety show, with guest stars John Ritter, George Hamilton and Tony Clifton (Andy Kaufman). A romantic triangle develops between Piggy, Ritter (who is in love with her) and Hamilton (who is uncomfortable with her romantic inclinations). Meanwhile, Kermit the Frog and the other Muppets try to run the show from a control room. At the end of the show, Piggy is furious to learn that her show is intended to be a special, rather than the first episode of a continuing series. She wrecks the studio, and she karate-chops John, who is impersonating her for the finale.

Highlights

- An opening number that ends with the dancers having to rescue a stuck Piggy.
- Piggy demonstrates "Snack-cercise", in which she describes a routine tailored to the act of consuming junk food.
- Hamilton and Piggy are the king and queen of a Polynesian-style luau.
- Ritter assists consumer advocate Piggy in "Don't Take It Lying Down, Sucker".
- Vegas-style entertainer Tony Clifton makes a grand entrance and performs a medley of pop songs and showtunes.
- Piggy and Hamilton (as Cary Grant) perform a romantic scene, which makes Kermit jealous.
- Piggy performs a solo, followed by a musical salute to the year.
- Clifton returns to join Piggy in a medley of standards.
- Hamilton sings to Piggy, then joins her in a medley of standards and love songs.
- Ritter impersonates Piggy for the finale after she goes rogue.

== Cast ==
- John Ritter as Himself
- George Hamilton as Himself
- Andy Kaufman as Tony Clifton
- Tom Harvey as Mr. Kevin T. Gregory, Pretend Network V.P.

=== Muppet performers ===
- Frank Oz as Miss Piggy, Fozzie Bear, Animal
- Jim Henson as Kermit the Frog
- Dave Goelz as Gonzo the Great, Dr. Bunsen Honeydew
- Richard Hunt as Janice, Scooter, Beaker

Additional Muppets performed by Kathryn Mullen, Karen Prell and Terry Angus.

=== Background Muppets ===
Rizzo the Rat, Zoot, Sam Eagle, Link Hogthrob, Chickens, Rats

== Music ==
1. "There'll Be Some Changes Made"
2. "Snack-cercise"
3. "Lulu of a Luau"
4. "Tony Clifton Medley" ("Dance to the Music", "I Write the Songs", "Music! Music! Music!", "Sing", "I Believe in Music")
5. "You Light Up My Life"
6. "Calendar Song"
7. "Medley" ("Isn't She Lovely", "This Is My Song", "You Do Something to Me", "That Old Black Magic")
8. "Three Times a Lady"
9. "The Look of Love" / "I Will Survive"
10. "The Impossible Dream"
