= Heartbeeps =

1981 film

- Theatrical release poster
- Directed by: Allan Arkush
- Screenplay by: John Hill
- Produced by: Michael Phillips
- Starring: Andy Kaufman; Bernadette Peters; Randy Quaid; Kenneth McMillan; Christopher Guest; Melanie Mayron; Richard B. Shull; Dick Miller
- Cinematography: Charles Rosher Jr.
- Edited by: Tina Hirsch
- Music by: John Williams
- Distributed by: Universal Pictures
- Release date: December 18, 1981
- Running time: 78 minutes
- Country: United States
- Language: English
- Budget: $12 million
- Box office: $2.1 million

Heartbeeps is a 1981 American science fiction romantic comedy film about two robots who fall in love and decide to strike out on their own. The film was directed by Allan Arkush, written by John Hill, and stars Andy Kaufman and Bernadette Peters as the robots alongside Randy Quaid, Kenneth McMillan, Melanie Mayron, Christopher Guest, and the "voice" of Jerry Garcia, who used guitar effects for a robot. It was Kaufman's final performance in a theatrical film. Universal Pictures released the film in the United States on December 18, 1981.

Stan Winston's make-up work for Heartbeeps made him one of the nominees for the inaugural Academy Award for Best Makeup in 1982, losing to Rick Baker for An American Werewolf in London.

Heartbeeps was lambasted by critics and was a box office failure, grossing only $2,154,696 on a $12 million budget.

== Plot ==
ValCom 17485 (Kaufman), a robot designed to be a valet with a specialty in lumber commodities, meets AquaCom 89045 (Peters), a hostess companion robot whose primary function is to assist at poolside parties. At a factory awaiting repairs, they fall in love and decide to escape, stealing a van from the company to do so.

They are joined by Catskil, a standup comic robot (which is seen, only sitting, in the entire film). His name is a reference to the Catskill Mountains Borscht Belt resorts, like Grossinger's Resort.

They embark on a quest to find a place to live, as well as satisfy their more immediate need for a fresh electrical supply. They assemble a small robot, Philco (also called Phil), built out of spare parts from the van they stole, whom they treat as their child. Phil speaks in a manner similar to R2-D2. His name is a reference to the Philco battery, radio, and television manufacturer.

Crimebuster, a malfunctioning law-enforcement robot, overhears the orders of the repair workers to get the robots back and goes after the fugitives. With the help of humans who run a junkyard and use Catskil's battery pack, the robots are able to save Phil before running out of power and being returned to the factory. Brought back to the factory, the robots are repeatedly repaired, and their memories cleared. Because they continue to malfunction, they are junked. They are found by the humans who run the junk yard and reassembled. In the junkyard, they live happily and build a sister for Phil named Sophia. The film ends with Crimebuster, after only pretending to have his mind erased, continuing to malfunction and going on another mission to recover the fugitive robots.

== Cast ==
- Andy Kaufman as ValCom-17485
- Bernadette Peters as AquaCom-89045
- Randy Quaid as Charlie
- Kenneth McMillan as Max
- Melanie Mayron as Susan
- Christopher Guest as Calvin
- Richard B. Shull as Factory Boss
- Dick Miller as Factory Watchman
- Kathleen Freeman as Helicopter Pilot
- Mary Woronov as Party House Owner
- Paul Bartel as Party Guest
- Wally Ann Wharton as Party Guest (as Anne Wharton, born Anne Marie Wharton)
- Barry Diamond as Firing Range Technician and Catskill Performer
- Stephanie Faulkner as Firing Range Technician
- Jeffrey Kramer as Party Butler Robot
- David Gene LeBell as Robot Forklift Driver
- Jerry Garcia as Philco's voice
- Jack Carter as Catskil-55602's voice
- Ron Gans as Crimebuster's voice

== Production ==
=== Development ===
Director Allan Arkush stated that his original intention for the film was for it to be "a Borzage movie with robots [...] [showing] the spiritual side of love, and the robots come to life because of the love, so I thought, 'This is a Borzage movie,' which was, you know, the wrong choice. They wanted a wacky comedy." In retrospect, he also stated that he should have allowed Andy Kaufman to play multiple parts in the film, a la Peter Sellers. "That's his gift, and I didn't see it [at the time]," said Arkush.

Sigourney Weaver was offered a role and was interested in the film, as she wanted to work with Andy Kaufman, but Weaver's agent persuaded her to turn it down.

Because of a strike by the Screen Actors Guild, filming was shut down in July 1980 (along with numerous other movies and television shows). The strike ended at the beginning of October 1980 (filming had started in June).

In his 1999 book Andy Kaufman: Revealed, Bob Zmuda wrote that Kaufman and Zmuda had "pitched" the screenplay of Kaufman's The Tony Clifton Story, a movie about the life and times of his alter-ego Tony Clifton, to Universal Studios. The Universal executives were concerned that Kaufman had not acted in films except for a small role, and they arranged for him to star in Heartbeeps to test whether he could carry a movie. When it became "a box office disaster", plans for the Clifton movie were cancelled.

John Hill adapted the screenplay into a novel, Heartbeeps, published in December 1981.

The film was promoted in magazines such as Starlog and Famous Monsters.

== Reception ==
=== Critical response ===
Reviews of the film were negative. On Rotten Tomatoes, the film has a score of 0% based on reviews from 6 critics, with an average rating of 1.6/10.

Vincent Canby wrote in The New York Times that it was "unbearable" and a "dreadfully coy story." Gary Arnold from the Washington Post noted how the film's stars Kaufman and Peters were "unlikely to face serious career setbacks from a minor fiasco only a handful of people will ever see," adding that he faulted the film for having "so little inherent momentum that it seems to need rewinding every few minutes."

Gene Siskel and Roger Ebert both gave the film a thumbs down, unfavorably comparing it to Star Wars, The Wizard of Oz and the 1967 Jean-Luc Godard film Weekend.

Kaufman felt the movie was so bad that he personally apologized for it on Late Night with David Letterman, and as a joke, promised to refund the money of everyone who paid to see it.

=== Accolades ===
Award	Category	Recipient(s)	Outcome
Saturn Award
Saturn Award	Best Science Fiction Film	Douglas Green	Nominated
Saturn Award	Best Make-Up	Stan Winston	Nominated
54th Academy Awards	Best Make-Up	Stan Winston	Nominated
1981 Stinkers Bad Movie Awards
1981 Stinkers Bad Movie Awards	Worst Picture*	Universal Pictures	Nominated
1981 Stinkers Bad Movie Awards	Worst Screenplay	Universal Pictures	Nominated
1981 Stinkers Bad Movie Awards	Most Painfully Unfunny Comedy	Universal Pictures	Nominated
1981 Stinkers Bad Movie Awards	Worst Actor	Andy Kaufman	Nominated
1981 Stinkers Bad Movie Awards	Most Annoying Fake Accent (Male)	Andy Kaufman	Nominated
1981 Stinkers Bad Movie Awards	Worst On-Screen Couple	Andy Kaufman and Bernadette Peters	Nominated

- Note: the film was nominated for Worst Picture both back when the original 1981 ballot was made and when it was revised in 2007. It lost both times.

== Home media ==
The film was released on DVD on September 13, 2005 and on Blu-ray on February 4, 2020.
