= Incredibly Strange Wrestling =

American professional wrestling promotion

- Acronym: ISW
- Founded: 1995
- Defunct: c. mid-2000s
- Style: Lucha libre, Parody
- Headquarters: California, United States
- Founders: Johnny Legend; Audra Angeli-Morse

Incredibly Strange Wrestling (a.k.a. "ISW") was a San Francisco–based professional wrestling promotion, heavily influenced by lucha libre and punk rock, which ran from 1995 until the mid-2000s. The promotion combined wrestling matches with musical performances by Punk, rockabilly, garage, psychobilly, and thrash metal bands.

Intended as an affectionate satire of Lucha Libre, Incredibly Strange Wrestling was created as a nightclub event by musician Johnny Legend and promoter Audra Angeli-Morse, juxtaposing satirical matches with live musical performances. ISW also featured many semi- and pro-wrestlers from the California Independent circuit, and eventually showcased several professional Luchadores from Mexico. ISW events were known for their outrageous storylines and colourful characters, such as Count Dante, El Homo Loco, and the Poontangler, often featuring comedic or satirical matches that subverted conventional wrestling tropes. Signature elements included tortilla flinging, audience participation, and a campy, gay-friendly atmosphere, with some wrestlers performing under alter egos drawn from pop culture and countercultural satire.

== History ==
Incredibly Strange Wrestling (ISW) was founded in San Francisco in May 1995. The first event took place on May 15, 1995, after hours at the Paradise Lounge and the adjacent Transmission Theater, organised by nightclub booker Audra Angeli-Morse and a small group of friends with interests in comic books, lucha libre, punk music, and underground performance. Musician Johnny Legend is also credited as founder and major initial influence, although Legend's time with ISW would be brief. The ISW initial show used improvised staging rather than a regulation ring and combined live music with wrestling matches performed by a mix of amateurs and semi-professional wrestlers, including performers from Mexico.

By mid-1995, ISW had acquired a proper wrestling ring and established a recurring format that placed the ring in front of a concert stage, integrating punk and rock bands with wrestling matches. The promotion drew heavily on Mexican lucha libre for its in-ring style while rejecting the conventions of mainstream US professional wrestling. Wrestlers performed under exaggerated and often provocative personas, many using masks, novelty costumes, or political and cultural caricatures. Audience participation became a defining feature, including the organised throwing of corn tortillas, introduced in the mid-1990s as a safer alternative to throwing bottles or cans.

Later in 1995, ISW joined several dates of the Lollapalooza tour as a sideshow attraction but withdrew after approximately five shows due to logistical problems and disagreements with tour organisers. Following its return to San Francisco, ISW developed a reputation through regular performances at the Transmission Theater, which became known within local underground music and art circles. During this period, creative tensions emerged between founders Johnny Legend and Audra Angeli-Morse, with Angeli-Morse eventually assuming primary control of promotion and booking.

From the late 1990s onward, ISW expanded into larger venues, including the Fillmore Auditorium, where it staged all-ages shows drawing crowds of more than 1,000 people. The promotion increasingly aligned itself with punk rock culture, booking established punk bands such as NOFX, 7 Seconds, the Dickies, and the Donnas to perform alongside wrestling matches. Characters during this period included Macho Sasquatcho, El Pollo Diablo, Super Pulga, El Homo Loco, Ku Klux Klown, Uncle NAMBLA, the Mexican Viking, and the SnackMaster. Storylines were scripted in outline form and performed cooperatively, though injuries were common.

Bob Calhoun, performing as Count Dante, became a prominent figure in ISW from the mid to late 1990s, serving as announcer, emcee, and wrestler. His character drew inspiration from the historical martial arts promoter John Keehan, who used the Count Dante name in the 1960s and early 1970s. Calhoun also fronted the band Count Dante and the Black Dragon Fighting Society, which regularly performed at ISW events. Other wrestlers maintained civilian careers alongside ISW, including work in education, biotechnology, web design, and delivery services.

ISW toured intermittently outside San Francisco, including a US tour in 1997 and later international dates in Europe. Touring exposed performers to audiences less familiar with ISW's satirical framing, which led to tensions and safety concerns. In 2001, ISW appeared on the Van's Warped Tour, where a Scientology-themed tag team called 69 Degrees performed as part of the show. The increased national exposure resulted in coverage in Rolling Stone and regional newspapers and coincided with repeated confrontations between ISW performers and members of the Church of Scientology at tour stops on the US East Coast. These encounters included ringside confrontations, removals by event security, and the receipt of cease-and-desist notices sent to ISW’s official email address. The final appearance of 69 Degrees took place at ISW's Homomania event in October 2001, which was also ISW’s final show at the Fillmore.

ISW marked its sixth anniversary in 2001 with a large event at the Fillmore. In the early 2000s, internal conflicts, performer turnover, injuries, fatigue, and declining touring opportunities, particularly in the post-September 2001 environment, affected the organisation. In 2003, following a European tour and several departures, Calhoun retired from wrestling.

By the mid-2000s, active ISW promotion had largely ceased. In 2008, Calhoun published Beer, Blood, and Cornmeal: Seven Years of Incredibly Strange Wrestling, documenting ISW’s activities from the mid-1990s through the early 2000s.

== Characters ==
ISW storylines and characters combined elements of surrealism, satire, and punk-influenced performance, blending professional wrestling with theatrical absurdity. Matches featured exaggerated, often grotesque personas, including Count Dante, a fast-talking martial arts motivational speaker and band frontman, and Dante the Baptist, an evolution of the character, portrayed as a born-again Christian wrestling a lion and engaging in theatrical moralistic storylines. Another prominent figure was El Homo Loco, a legitimately gay man expressing himself through wrestling who became a local hero in the promotion’s gay-friendly environment. Female performers also had prominent roles, most notably the Poontangler, who participated in storylines involving paternity disputes in which she sought to determine the fathers of her unseen illegitimate children through wrestling matches with male performers.

Other participants in ISW included a Scientology-themed boy band called 69 Degrees (consisting of Bad Boy Corey and Dancin' Joey), which performed pop songs referencing Dianetics and was presented as deliberately antagonistic to the largely countercultural audience. 69 Degrees acted as comic antagonists to El Homo Loco and the Cruiser, ISW’s gay tag team. Their storylines revolved around attempts to "convert" El Homo Loco using a so-called “dehomo-sexualizing” box, a spray-painted cardboard prop humorously credited to L. Ron Hubbard. When that failed, 69 Degrees showcased a series of absurdly named wrestling moves—such as the "Tom Cruise Missile" and "the $40 Million Flop", a nod to the box-office bomb that was Battlefield Earth.

Other ISW characters included The Amazing Caltiki, The Ku Klux Klown, El Borracho Gigante, Cletus "The Fetus" Kincaid, The Abortionist, El Asesino Postal, El Fisico Nuclear, R.U.R. 2000, Anarchie, El Hijo de Executivo, Killer Kimera, Harley Racist, Vandal Drummond, La Chingona, The Inbred Abomination, Chango Loco, El Pollo Diablo, Americon Man, Libido Gigante, Macho Sasquatcho, The Mexican Viking, the lounge lizard, L'Empereur, The Cruiser, U.S. Steele, Risa de Muerte, and Count Dante.

The promotion also staged themed matches and gimmicks. These included the "Christians to the Lions" match, in which a cross-carrying character named Jesus Cross wrestled an opponent in a lion costume, and the Uncle N.A.M.B.L.A. vs. Lil’ Timmy" match, which depicted a character presented as a paedophile facing a schoolboy character.

== Bands ==
Initially, under the influence of Johnny Legend, ISW featured Rockabilly music bands, but following a split between Legend and Angeli-Morse, Angeli-Morse took the music in a punk direction and enlisted bands like NOFX, 7 Seconds, The Dickies, and The Donnas. Notable bands who performed at ISW shows during its height in the 1990s include Mike Watt, The Supersuckers, The Bomboras, Fear, The Ghastly Ones, Legendary Invisible Men, The Queers, Demented Are Go, Deadbolt, Me First and the Gimme Gimmes, and The Mad Capsule Markets.

== See also ==
- Hoodslam - A professional wrestling promotion based in neighbouring Oakland, California featuring a similar absurdist and Punk approach to professional wrestling
