= Man on the Moon (film) =

1999 film by Miloš Forman

- Theatrical release poster
- Directed by: Miloš Forman
- Written by: Scott Alexander; Larry Karaszewski
- Produced by: Danny DeVito; Michael Shamberg; Stacey Sher
- Starring: Jim Carrey; Danny DeVito; Courtney Love; Paul Giamatti
- Cinematography: Anastas N. Michos
- Edited by: Adam Boome; Lynzee Klingman; Christopher Tellefsen
- Music by: R.E.M.
- Production companies: Universal Pictures; Mutual Film Company; Jersey Films; Cinehaus; Shapiro/West Productions; Tele München Fernseh Produktionsgesellschaft; BBC Films; Marubeni; Toho-Towa
- Distributed by: Universal Pictures (United States, Canada, United Kingdom, and Ireland); United International Pictures (United Kingdom and Ireland); Concorde Filmverleih (Germany); Toho-Towa (Japan)
- Release dates: December 22, 1999 (United States); May 5, 2000 (United Kingdom); May 11, 2000 (Germany); June 10, 2000 (Japan)
- Running time: 119 minutes
- Countries: United States; United Kingdom; Germany; Japan
- Language: English
- Budget: $52–82 million
- Box office: $47 million

Man on the Moon is a 1999 biographical tragicomedy film about American entertainer Andy Kaufman, starring Jim Carrey as Kaufman. The film was directed by Miloš Forman, and also features Danny DeVito, Courtney Love, and Paul Giamatti.

The story traces Kaufman's steps from childhood through the comedy club and television appearances that made him famous, including his memorable appearances on Saturday Night Live, Late Night with David Letterman, and Fridays, and his role as Latka Gravas on the sitcom Taxi, which was popular among viewers, but disruptive for Kaufman's co-stars (DeVito, who also co-produced the film, co-starred with the real Kaufman on the series). The film pays particular attention to the various inside jokes, scams, put-ons, and happenings for which Kaufman was famous, most significantly his long-running "feud" with wrestler Jerry "The King" Lawler and his portrayal of the character of bawdy lounge singer Tony Clifton.

It was released in the United States on December 22, 1999, and in the United Kingdom on May 5, 2000, by Universal Pictures and by Warner Bros. Pictures in some markets. Although the film was commercially unsuccessful and received mixed reviews, Carrey received critical acclaim for his performance and won a Golden Globe, his second in a row after his award for The Truman Show, this time the win being in the Musical or Comedy category.

The documentary Jim & Andy: The Great Beyond was released in 2017 and chronicles Carrey's performance as Kaufman in the film, a performance he maintained during much of the film's production.

== Plot ==
Andy Kaufman is a struggling entertainer whose unconventional performances bewilder nightclub audiences. Rather than tell jokes, he sings the Mighty Mouse theme song and performs as a timid foreign man. Just as the audience begins to dismiss him, Kaufman transforms into an accomplished Elvis impersonator, revealing that his apparent ineptitude was part of the act.

After attracting attention with an appearance on Saturday Night Live, Kaufman is signed by talent agent George Shapiro, who secures him a role on the television sitcom Taxi. Although Kaufman dislikes sitcoms, he accepts the offer in exchange for greater exposure and the promise of his own television special. His foreign man character is adapted into the role of mechanic Latka Gravas.

Kaufman introduces Shapiro to Tony Clifton, an obnoxious lounge singer whom he wants to appear on Taxi. Clifton subsequently reveals himself to be Kaufman in disguise, a character developed with his creative partner, Bob Zmuda. As Kaufman's fame grows, audiences increasingly demand familiar characters rather than his experimental antihumor. He responds by deliberately frustrating their expectations, including reading the entirety of The Great Gatsby aloud during a performance. When he appears on the Taxi set as Clifton and behaves outrageously, he is forcibly removed.

Seeking new ways to provoke audiences, Kaufman begins professional wrestling, challenging women and proclaiming himself the "Inter-Gender Wrestling Champion". He develops a romantic relationship with one of his opponents, Lynne Margulies. His unpredictable behaviour also causes controversy when he refuses to deliver his scripted lines during a live broadcast of Fridays.

Kaufman subsequently begins a public feud with professional wrestler Jerry Lawler, who apparently injures him with a piledriver during a match. Their rivalry continues on Late Night with David Letterman, where an ostensibly conciliatory appearance degenerates into insults and a physical confrontation. Public dissatisfaction with Kaufman's wrestling antics leads to his removal from Saturday Night Live following an audience vote. Shapiro discovers that Kaufman and Lawler are actually friends who have staged their feud, and advises them to end their collaboration. He later informs Kaufman that Taxi has been cancelled, news that leaves Kaufman unconcerned.

After a nightclub performance, Kaufman reveals to Margulies, Zmuda and Shapiro that he has been diagnosed with lung cancer. Accustomed to his elaborate deceptions, his friends initially suspect another hoax. Determined to fulfil a lifelong ambition, Kaufman arranges a performance at Carnegie Hall, where he delights the audience before inviting everyone out for milk and cookies.

As his condition worsens, Kaufman travels to the Philippines seeking treatment through psychic surgery. Discovering that the procedure is fraudulent, he laughs at the irony of having been deceived himself. He dies on May 16, 1984, aged 35. At his funeral, mourners sing along to a recording of Kaufman performing "This Friendly World".

A year later, Tony Clifton performs "I Will Survive" at a tribute to Kaufman at The Comedy Store, while Zmuda, who had also portrayed Clifton during Kaufman's lifetime, watches from the audience.

== Cast ==
- Jim Carrey as Andy Kaufman / Tony Clifton / Latka Gravas
- Danny DeVito as George Shapiro
- Courtney Love as Lynne Margulies
- Paul Giamatti as Bob Zmuda / Tony Clifton
- Vincent Schiavelli as ABC Executive Maynard Smith
- Peter Bonerz as Taxi Producer Ed. Weinberger
- Jerry Lawler as himself
- Gerry Becker as Stanley Kaufman, Andy's father
- Leslie Lyles as Janice Kaufman, Andy's mother
- Melanie Vesey as Carol Kaufman
  - Brittany Colonna as young Carol Kaufman; Colonna is Andy Kaufman's granddaughter.
- Michael Kelly as Michael Kaufman
- George Shapiro as Mr. Besserman
- Richard Belzer as himself
- Patton Oswalt as Blue Collar Guy
- Michael Villani as Merv Griffin
- Bob Zmuda as Jack Burns
- Tracey Walter as National Enquirer Editor

Several members of the cast of Taxi, including Marilu Henner, Judd Hirsch, Christopher Lloyd, Carol Kane, and Jeff Conaway make cameos, playing themselves. Danny DeVito, who was also in the cast of Taxi, co-starred in the film but did not appear as himself.

Many of Kaufman's other real-life friends and co-stars also appear in the film (although not all as themselves), including Zmuda, Shapiro, Margulies, David Letterman, Paul Shaffer, professional wrestler Jerry Lawler, wrestling announcers Jim Ross and Lance Russell, The Improv comedy-club founder Budd Friedman, Saturday Night Live creator Lorne Michaels, and actors Vincent Schiavelli and Chad Whitson. Michael Richards is played by Norm Macdonald in a recreation of the Fridays show skit. According to Jerry Lawler's autobiography It's Good to be the King ... sometimes, WCW wrestler Glenn Gilbertti, better known to wrestling fans as Disco Inferno, was considered for the role of Lawler.

Kevin Spacey, Edward Norton, Nicolas Cage, John Cusack and Hank Azaria auditioned for the role of Andy Kaufman.

== Production ==
Man on the Moon was shot from July 27 to November 24, 1998, in Los Angeles and New York. The film's production is notable for Carrey's rigid method acting, staying in-character as Kaufman both on and off the set for the duration of production. Carrey's adherence to the role reached the extent where he would develop unscripted tics and habits that were previously characteristic of Kaufman himself. Among other examples, Courtney Love noted how Carrey would stuff his clothing with Limburger cheese on the set when playing Kaufman's Tony Clifton character in the film, something Kaufman had done in his own performances of the character. During filming, Lawler and Carrey got into an altercation. When Lawler informed Forman of Carrey’s demands to do the piledriver stunt himself, Forman wrapped filming for the day. Carrey then spat in Lawler's face and Lawler responded by pulling Carrey’s hair and locking him in a sleeper hold, which led to Carrey being hospitalized with four compressed vertebrae.

A documentary, Jim & Andy: The Great Beyond, was released in November 2017. Using behind-the-scenes footage, the documentary covers the production of Man on the Moon with a particular focus on Carrey's overwrought method-acting as Kaufman.

== Soundtrack ==
The soundtrack for the film was written by rock band R.E.M., whose 1992 song "Man on the Moon" (originally written in honor of Kaufman) gave the film its title. The soundtrack also included the Grammy-nominated song "The Great Beyond", which remains the band's highest-charting single in the United Kingdom.

== Historical accuracy ==
The film makes a few changes to Kaufman's life story. As Kaufman (played by Carrey) explains in the film's prologue, "All the most important things in my life are changed around and mixed up for dramatic purposes."

The famous Carnegie Hall "milk and cookies" performance, portrayed in the film as one of his last performances after being diagnosed with cancer, had in fact occurred in 1979, five years before Kaufman's death and well before his diagnosis. Also, the film is deliberately ambiguous over whether Kaufman actually died or if this was a hoax as some fans believe.

The film implies that Carol Kane was a member of the Taxi cast during the show's first season, which in real life was 1978–79. In actuality, Kane did not make her first appearance on the series until the episode "Guess Who's Coming for Brefnish", which first aired on ABC in January 1980 during the show's second season. The film implies that Taxi was canceled only once. However, the show went on for one more season on NBC.

Other inaccuracies include scenes supposedly drawn from SNL, specifically the first episode's host, who is depicted as having been Richard Belzer but was George Carlin in real life. Belzer also erroneously refers to the show as "Saturday Night Live" during the sequence, but that title wasn't adopted until season two. The Mighty Mouse segment also prolongs the "dead air" before the record starts playing (in reality he only paused a few seconds). The scene where Lorne Michaels asks the home viewing audience to vote Kaufman off the show happened in 1982, two years after Michaels left the show as executive producer and Dick Ebersol took over.

After its release, the film attracted some criticism over various events in Kaufman's life that were left out. Max Allan Collins maintained that the filmmakers did not understand Kaufman, and that the film "does not give Kaufman the credit for his genius, that he had a complete intellectual grasp of what he was up to and a showman's instincts for how to play an audience." These critics included Kaufman's own father Stanley, who was displeased that little of Andy's early life (before show business) and early career were portrayed.

Sam Simon, season 5 writer on Taxi, stated in a 2013 interview with Marc Maron for the WTF with Marc Maron podcast that the portrayal of Andy on the show was "a complete fiction," that Kaufman was "completely professional" and that he "told you Tony Clifton was him." Simon also stated that sources for these stories were mostly from Bob Zmuda and a "little bit of press and hype," but conceded that Kaufman would have "loved" Zmuda's version of events. As of 2020, occasional Taxi actress Carol Kane was the only Taxi cast member to have acknowledged attending his funeral.

== Reception ==
On the review aggregator website Rotten Tomatoes, 64% of 122 critics' reviews are positive, with an average rating of 6.2/10. The website's consensus reads: "Jim Carrey is eerily dead-on in his portrayal of Andy Kaufman, which helps to elevate Man on the Moon above the script's formulaic biopic cliches." Metacritic, which uses a weighted average, assigned a score of 58 out of 100, based on 34 critics, indicating "mixed or average reviews". Audiences polled by CinemaScore gave the film an average grade of "B−" on an A+ to F scale.

Roger Ebert, giving the film three-and-a-half stars out of four, wrote for the Chicago Sun Times:

What is most wonderful about 'Man on the Moon,' a very good film, is that it remains true to Kaufman's stubborn vision. Oh, it brightens things up a little [...] But essentially it stays true to his persona: A guy who would test you, fool you, lie to you, deceive you and stage elaborate deceptions, put-ons and hoaxes.

Man on the Moon ended a string of films starring Jim Carrey that had very successful opening weekends, and grossed just $47 million against a budget of $52 million. Although the film received mixed reviews from critics, they were near unanimous in their praise for Carrey's portrayal of Andy Kaufman. Carrey won a Golden Globe for his performance, and the film was nominated for Best Musical or Comedy as well.
