= Two Boots =

American pizzeria chain

Two Boots location in Downtown Los Angeles

Two Boots is a chain of pizzerias based in New York City. The pizzeria chain has been owned by Double Shot LLC since 2019 after being founded by Phil Hartman and Doris Kornish. Phil Hartman is still deeply involved. Inspired by New Orleans ingredients and New Haven-style pizza, Two Boots locations are colorful and artistic, including elements and art from the surrounding neighborhood.

== Attributes ==
The chain is named after the boot-shaped country of Italy and US state of Louisiana. The chain is inspired by New Orleans with Cajun ingredients and New Haven foods, and by East Village with its eccentric ambiance. The pizza is directly inspired by New Haven-style pizza, with cornmeal embedded in its crust.

Each location has its own distinctive characteristics, incorporating elements of the neighborhood, with artist commissions for murals, mosaics, and sculptures to feature in an individual pizzeria. As well, each location has a unique menu item that pays homage to its community; for example, the Hogwallop pie in the Park Slope, Brooklyn location was named after a character in the film O Brother, Where Art Thou?, played by Park Slope resident John Turturro.

In March 2020, Two Boots was included in Forbes' 15 Of The Best Food Delivery Options In Manhattan.

== History ==
In 1987, Phil Hartman opened the first location along with his ex-wife Doris Kornish and real estate developer John Touhey. They opened in a part of East Village in Manhattan, a neighborhood known for its drug-dealing at the time. The chain slowly grew around Manhattan. By 2017, the business had 15 locations.
