= John Joseph Blassie =

American politician

Member of the U.S. House of Representatives from Missouri's 98th district
- In office 1967–1977

Missouri House of Representatives

Personal details
- Born: 1924 St. Louis, Missouri
- Died: 1984 (aged 59–60)
- Party: Democratic
- Spouse: Ann Catalano
- Children: 2 sons
- Occupation: juvenile court clerk

John Joseph Blassie (February 11, 1924 - May 1982) was a Democratic politician who served in the Missouri House of Representatives in the 1960s and 1970s. He was born in St. Louis, Missouri, and was educated in St. Joseph Grade School and Ranken Trade School. On May 5, 1947, he married Ann Catalano in St. Louis.
