= Andy Kaufman =

American entertainer (1949–1984)

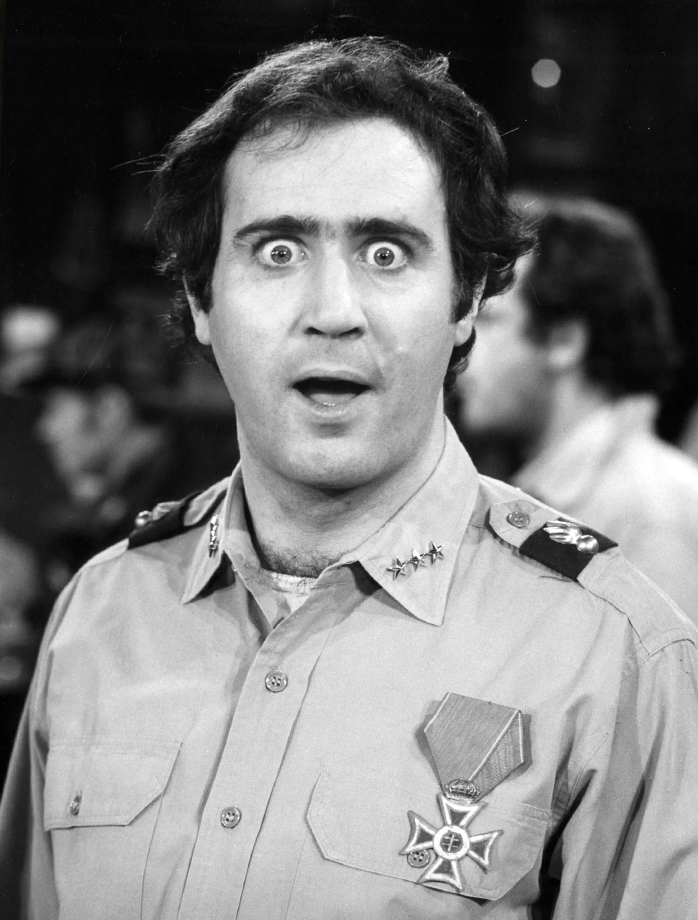
- Kaufman in 1979, playing his "Foreign Man" character
- Born: Andrew Geoffrey Kaufman; January 17, 1949; New York City, US
- Died: May 16, 1984 (aged 35); Los Angeles, California, US
- Occupations: Actor; comedian; singer; dancer; performance artist; professional wrestler; prankster
- Years active: 1971–1984
- Style: Alternative comedy; Anti-humor; cringe humor; character comedy; surreal comedy; improvisational comedy
- Partner: Lynne Margulies (1982–1984)
- Children: 1

Andrew Geoffrey Kaufman (/ˈkaʊfmən/ KOWF-mən; January 17, 1949 – May 16, 1984) was an American entertainer and performance artist. He has sometimes been called an "anti-comedian". He disdained telling jokes and engaging in comedy as it was traditionally understood, once saying in an interview, "I am not a comic, I have never told a joke. The comedian's promise is that he will go out there and make you laugh with him. My only promise is that I will try to entertain you as best I can."

After working in small comedy clubs in the early 1970s, Kaufman came to the attention of a wider audience in 1975, when he was invited to perform portions of his act on the first season of Saturday Night Live. His Foreign Man character was the basis of his performance as Latka Gravas on the television show Taxi from 1978 until 1983.

During this time, he continued to tour comedy clubs and theaters in a series of unique performance art/comedy shows, sometimes appearing as himself and sometimes as obnoxiously rude lounge singer Tony Clifton. He was also a frequent guest on sketch comedy and late-night talk shows, particularly Late Night with David Letterman. In 1982, Kaufman brought his professional wrestling villain act to Letterman's show by way of a staged encounter with Jerry "The King" Lawler of the Continental Wrestling Association. The fact that the altercation was planned was not publicly disclosed for over a decade.

Kaufman died of lung cancer on May 16, 1984, at the age of 35. As pranks and elaborate ruses were major elements of his career, persistent rumors have circulated that Kaufman faked his own death as a grand hoax. Nonetheless, he continues to be respected for the variety of his characters, his uniquely counterintuitive approach to comedy, and his willingness to provoke negative and confused reactions from audiences.

== Early life ==
Kaufman was born on January 17, 1949, in New York City, the oldest of three children. He grew up with his younger brother Michael and sister Carol in a middle-class Jewish family in Great Neck, Long Island. His mother was Janice (née Bernstein), a homemaker and former fashion model, and his father was Stanley Kaufman, a jewelry salesman. Kaufman began performing at children's birthday parties at age 9, playing records and showing cartoons. Kaufman spent much of his youth writing poetry and stories, including an unpublished novel, The Hollering Mangoo, which he completed at age 16. Following a visit to his school from Nigerian musician Babatunde Olatunji, Kaufman began playing the congas.

After graduating from Great Neck North High School in 1967, Kaufman took a year off before enrolling at the now defunct two-year Grahm Junior College in Boston, where he studied television production and starred in his own campus television show, Uncle Andy's Fun House. In August 1969, he hitchhiked to Las Vegas to meet Elvis Presley, showing up unannounced at the International Hotel. Soon after, he began performing at coffee houses and developing his act, as well as writing a one-man play, Gosh (later renamed God and published in 2000). After graduating in 1971, he began performing stand-up comedy at various small clubs on the East Coast.

== Career ==
=== Foreign Man and Mighty Mouse ===
...Bijan Kimiachi, an Iranian immigrant who was Andy's roommate at the now defunct Grahm Junior College in Boston, who was, like him, studying television production (though he says here Andy was studying television performance). Kimiachi speaks with a marked accent—he says he had trouble speaking to people then, and also that he was probably Andy's only friend at that time. By the roommate's common consent, Andy adopted Bijan's accent (and perhaps his voice as well).

Kaufman first received major attention for his character Foreign Man, who spoke in a meek, high-pitched, heavily accented voice and claimed to be from "Caspiar", a fictional island in the Caspian Sea. As this character, Kaufman persuaded Budd Friedman, owner of the New York City comedy club The Improv, to allow him to perform on stage.

As Foreign Man, Kaufman appeared on stage at comedy clubs, played a recording of the theme from the Mighty Mouse cartoon show while standing perfectly still, and lip-synced only the line "Here I come to save the day", with great enthusiasm. He proceeded to tell a few (intentionally poor) jokes and concluded his act with a series of celebrity impersonations, with the comedy arising from the character's obvious ineptitude at impersonation. For example, in his fake accent, Kaufman announced to the audience, "I would like to imitate Meester Carter, de president of de United States" and then, in exactly the same voice, say "Hello, I am Meester Carter, de president of de United States. T'ank you veddy much." At some point in the performance, usually when the audience was conditioned to Foreign Man's inability to perform a convincing impression, Foreign Man would announce, "And now I would like to imitate the Elvis Presley", turn around, take off his jacket, slick his hair back, and launch into a rousing, hip-shaking rendition of Presley singing one of his hit songs. Like Presley, he took off his leather jacket during the song and threw it into the audience, but unlike Presley, Foreign Man immediately asked for it to be returned. After the song's finale, he would take a simple bow and say in his Foreign Man voice, "T'ank you veddy much."

Parts of Kaufman's Foreign Man act were broadcast in the first season of Saturday Night Live. The Mighty Mouse number was featured in the October 11, 1975, premiere, while the joke-telling and celebrity impressions (including Elvis) were included in the November 8 broadcast that same year. In 1976, on the short-lived show Van Dyke and Company, he adapted the Foreign Man character to a character named "Andy" who kept interrupting Dick Van Dyke's sketches to do his impressions and songs.

=== Latka ===
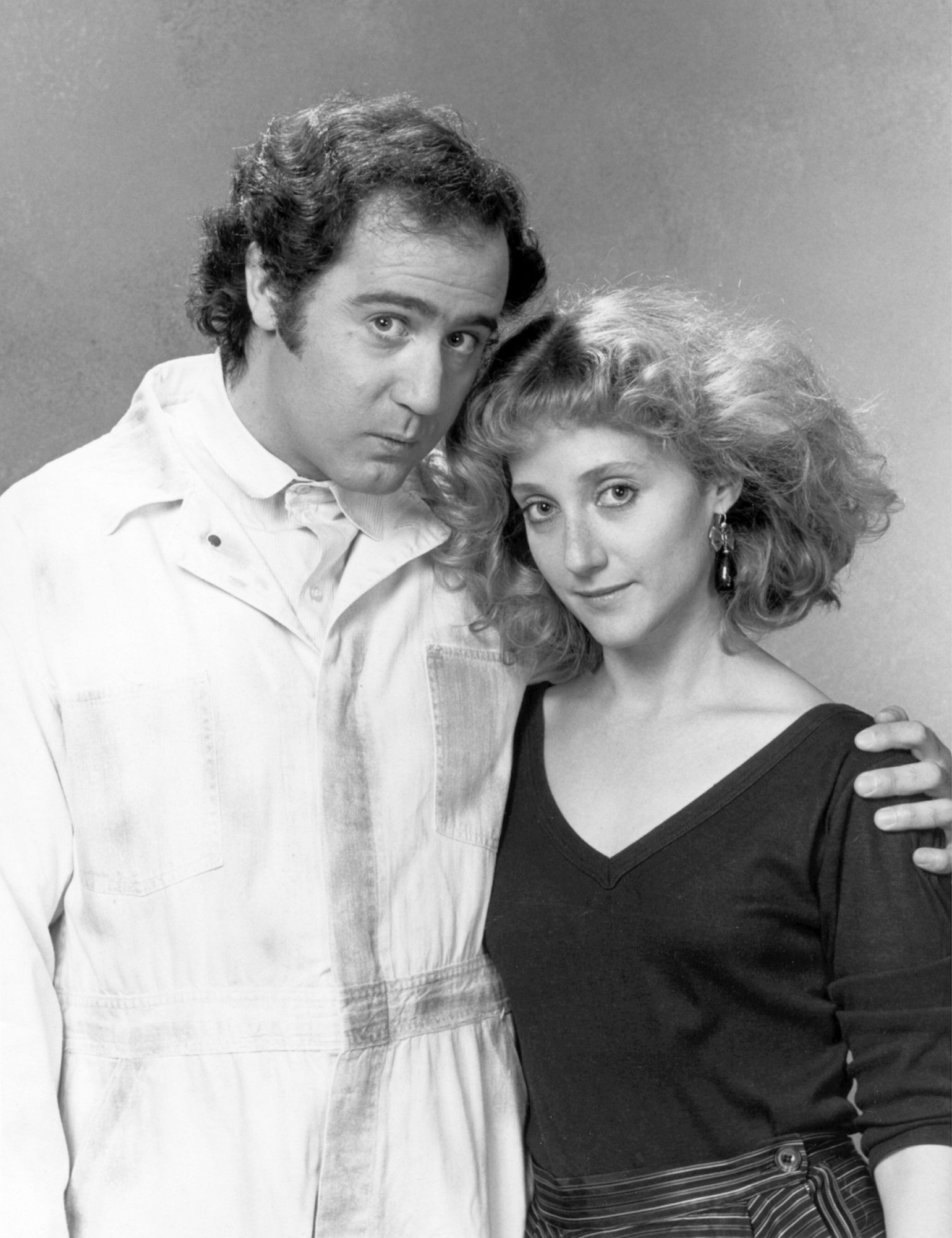
Kaufman with Carol Kane in a promotional picture of Taxi, 1982

The Foreign Man character was changed into Latka Gravas for ABC's sitcom Taxi, appearing in 79 of 114 episodes in 1978–83. Friend and longtime collaborator Bob Zmuda confirms this: "They basically were buying Andy's Foreign Man character for the Taxi character Latka." Kaufman's longtime manager George Shapiro encouraged him to take the gig.

Kaufman disliked sitcoms and was not happy with the idea of being in one, but Shapiro convinced him that it would quickly lead to stardom, which would earn him money he could then put into his own act. Kaufman agreed to appear in 14 episodes per season, and he initially wanted four for Kaufman's alter ego Tony Clifton. After Kaufman deliberately sabotaged Clifton's appearance on the show, however, that part of his contract was dropped.

His character was given multiple personality disorder, which allowed Kaufman to randomly portray other characters. In one episode of Taxi, Kaufman's character came down with a condition that made him act like Alex Rieger, the main character played by Judd Hirsch. Another such recurring character played by Kaufman was Latka's womanizing alter ego Vic Ferrari.

Sam Simon, who early in his career was a writer and later showrunner for Taxi, stated in a 2013 interview on Marc Maron's WTF podcast that the story of Kaufman having been generally disruptive on the show was "a complete fiction" largely created by Zmuda. Simon maintained that Zmuda has a vested interest in promoting an out-of-control image of Kaufman. In the interview Simon stated that Kaufman was "completely professional" and that he "told you Tony Clifton was him", but he also conceded that Kaufman would have "loved" Zmuda's version of events.

Kaufman was nominated for the Golden Globe Award for Best Supporting Actor in a Series, Limited Series, or Motion Picture Made for Television for Taxi in 1979 and 1981.

=== Tony Clifton ===
Another well-known Kaufman character is Tony Clifton, an absurd, audience-abusing lounge singer who began opening for Kaufman at comedy clubs and eventually even performed concerts on his own around the country. Sometimes it was Kaufman performing as Clifton, sometimes it was his brother Michael or Zmuda. For a brief time, it was unclear to some that Clifton was not a real person. News programs interviewed Clifton as Kaufman's opening act, with the mood turning ugly whenever Kaufman's name came up. Kaufman, Clifton insisted, was attempting to ruin Clifton's "good name" to make money and become famous.

As a requirement for Kaufman's accepting the offer to star on Taxi, he insisted that Clifton be hired for a guest role on the show as if he were a real person, not a character. After throwing a tantrum on the set, Clifton was fired and escorted from the studio lot by security guards. Much to Kaufman's delight, this incident was reported in the local newspapers.

=== Saturday Night Live Elvis sketch incident ===
On the January 30, 1982, episode of Saturday Night Live, while impersonating Elvis Presley in a sketch, Kaufman broke character by removing his wig and apologizing to the audience.

Kaufman explained this incident on the February 17, 1982, episode of Late Night with David Letterman. He said that he had apologized because he disagreed with how Presley was portrayed in the sketch, which involved Presley instructing two young women from his audience to visit him backstage, where they would wrestle topless in mud. Kaufman said that he had initially declined to perform the sketch but was pressured into it. He also alleged that SNL staff threatened to ruin his reputation in the industry if he did not perform the sketch.

The sketch was a reference to an incident alleged by Albert Goldman's controversial 1981 biography of Presley. Critics of the biography derided its scornful tone and charged that it was intended as an exposé. Kaufman said that Goldman threatened to sue him after the episode aired, but Kaufman challenged Goldman to a public debate on Presley's character.

=== Carnegie Hall show ===
At the beginning of an April 1979 performance at New York's Carnegie Hall, Kaufman invited his "grandmother" to watch the show from a chair that he had placed at the side of the stage. At the end of the show, she stood, removed her mask, and revealed to the audience that she was actually comedian Robin Williams.

Kaufman also had an elderly woman (Eleanor Cody Gould) pretend to have a heart attack and die on stage, after which he reappeared on stage wearing a Native American headdress and performing a dance over her body, "reviving" her.

Kaufman ended the show by taking the entire audience, in 24 buses, for milk and cookies. He invited anyone interested to meet him on the Staten Island Ferry the next morning, where the show continued.

=== TV specials ===
The Taxi deal with ABC included a television special/pilot for Kaufman. He proposed Andy's Funhouse, based on a routine that he had developed while in junior college. The special was taped in 1977 but did not air until August 1979. It featured most of Andy's famous gags, including Foreign Man/Latka and his Elvis Presley impersonation, as well as a host of unique segments (including a special appearance by children's television character Howdy Doody and the "Has-been Corner"). The program also included a segment with fake television screen static as part of the gag, although ABC executives feared that viewers would mistake the static for broadcast problems and would change the channel—which was the comic element that Kaufman wanted to present. Andy's Funhouse was written by Kaufman, Zmuda and Mel Sherer, with music by Kaufman.

In March 1980, Kaufman filmed a short segment for an ABC show called Buckshot. The segment was just over six minutes long and was called Uncle Andy's Funhouse. It featured Kaufman as the host of a children's show for adults, complete with a peanut gallery and Tony Clifton puppet.

In 1983, a show very similar to Andy's Funhouse and Uncle Andy's Funhouse was filmed for PBS's SoundStage program called The Andy Kaufman Show. It too featured a peanut gallery, and opened in the middle of an interview in which Kaufman was laughing hysterically. He then proceeded to thank the audience for watching and the credits rolled.

=== Fridays incidents ===
In 1981, Kaufman made three appearances on Fridays, a variety show on ABC that was similar to Saturday Night Live. In the last sketch on his first appearance, the cast were to deliberately break the scene and improvise an argument. Kaufman broke character first, announcing that he "felt stupid" and refusing to say his lines. In response, cast member Michael Richards walked off camera, returned with a set of cue cards, and dumped them on the table in front of Kaufman, who responded by splashing Richards with water. Coproducer Jack Burns stormed onto the stage, leading to a fake brawl on camera before the show cut to a commercial.

Richards claimed that what was going to happen was known only to him, Burns and Kaufman, but Melanie Chartoff, who played Kaufman's wife in the sketch, said that just before airtime Burns told her, Richards, and Maryedith Burrell that Kaufman was going to break the fourth wall.

Kaufman appeared the next week in a videotaped "apology" to the home viewers. Later that year, he returned to host Fridays. At one point during the show, he invited Lawrence Welk Show singer Kathie Sullivan to the stage to sing some gospel songs with him and announced that the two were engaged to be married. He then talked to the audience about his newfound faith in Jesus (Kaufman was Jewish), but the scene was a hoax. Later, following a sketch about a drug-abusing pharmacist, instead of introducing The Pretenders, he delivered a nervous speech about the harmfulness of drugs while the band stood behind him ready to play. After his speech, he informed the audience that he had talked too long and that the show needed to pause for a commercial break.

=== Appearances ===
Although Kaufman made a name for himself as a guest on NBC's Saturday Night Live, his first prime-time appearances were several guest spots as Foreign Man on the Dick Van Dyke variety show Van Dyke and Company in 1976. He appeared four times on The Tonight Show in 1976–78, with Foreign Man doing his imitation of Johnny Carson's sidekick Ed McMahon, with no change in voice: "Ha ha ha. Ha ha ha. How hot was eet. Ha ha ha." Kaufman also appeared three times on NBC's late-night concert series The Midnight Special in 1972, 1977, and 1981. Kaufman appeared on The Dating Game in 1978, in character as Foreign Man, and cried when the bachelorette chose Bachelor No. 1, protesting that he had answered all the questions correctly.

His SNL appearances started with the first show, on October 11, 1975. He made 16 SNL appearances in all, doing routines from his comedy act, such as the Mighty Mouse singalong, Foreign Man, and the Elvis impersonation. After he angered the audience with his female-wrestling routine, executive producer Dick Ebersol announced on the show that viewers would be allowed to decide Kaufman's fate. On the November 20, 1982, episode, SNL held a phone vote, and 195,544 people voted to "Dump Andy" while 169,186 people voted to "Keep Andy".

During the SNL episode with the phone poll, many of the cast members stated their admiration for Kaufman's work. After Eddie Murphy read both numbers, he said, "Now, Andy Kaufman is a friend of mine. Keep that in mind when you call. I don't want to have to punch nobody in America in the face", and Mary Gross read the Dump Andy phone number at a rate so fast that audiences were unable to catch it. The final tally was read by Gary Kroeger to a cheering audience. As the credits rolled, announcer Don Pardo said, "This is Don Pardo saying, 'I voted for Andy Kaufman.'"

Following the poll results, Kaufman made one more appearance on the show via a prerecorded 30-second message on Weekend Update (then called "Saturday Night News"). In the message, Kaufman expressed his gratitude for being on the show and said he had resorted to buying time on low-rated independent TV stations to be heard. After wrapping up, anchorman Brad Hall said, "It's pretty sad. NBC would like to announce that not only is Kaufman still banned from this show, but he now owes the NBC television network several thousand dollars and some change." This was Kaufman's last appearance on the show.

Kaufman made a number of appearances on the daytime edition of The David Letterman Show in 1980, and 11 appearances on Late Night with David Letterman in 1982–83. He made numerous guest spots on other television programs hosted by or starring celebrities like Johnny Cash (1979 Christmas special), Dick Van Dyke, Dinah Shore, Rodney Dangerfield, Cher, Dean Martin, Redd Foxx, Mike Douglas, Dick Clark, and Joe Franklin.

He appeared in his first theatrical film, God Told Me To, in 1976, in which he portrayed a murderous policeman. He appeared in two other theatrical films, including the 1980 film In God We Tru$t, in which he played a televangelist, and the 1981 film Heartbeeps, in which he played a robot.

Laurie Anderson worked alongside Kaufman for a time in the 1970s, acting as a sort of "straight man" in a number of his Manhattan and Coney Island performances. One of these performances included getting on a ride that people stand in and get spun around. After everyone was strapped in, Kaufman would start saying how he did not want to be on the ride in a panicked tone and eventually cry. Anderson later described these performances in her 1995 album, The Ugly One with the Jewels.

In 1983, Kaufman appeared on Broadway with Deborah Harry in the play Teaneck Tanzi: The Venus Flytrap. It closed after just two performances.

== Professional wrestling ==
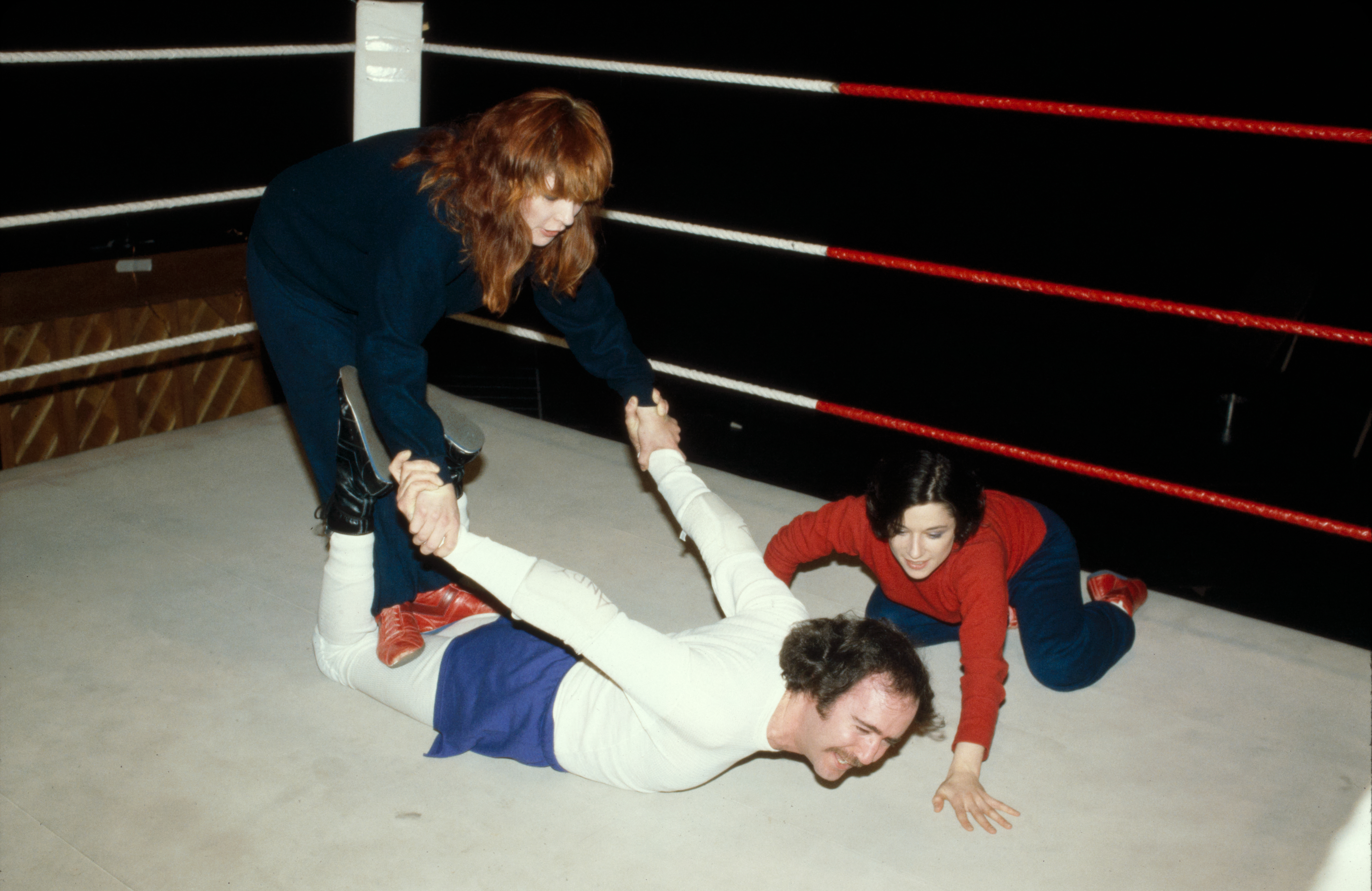
Kaufman wrestling with Debbie Harry and Caitlin Clarke in 1983

Inspired by the theatricality of kayfabe, the staged nature of the sport of professional wrestling, and his own tendency to form elaborate hoaxes, Kaufman began wrestling women during his act and proclaimed himself "Inter-Gender Wrestling Champion of the World", adopting an aggressive and ridiculous personality based on the characters invented by professional wrestlers. He offered a $1,000 prize to any woman who could pin him. He employed performance artist Laurie Anderson, a friend of his, in this act for a while.

Kaufman initially approached the head of the World Wrestling Federation (WWF, later WWE) Vince McMahon Sr., about bringing his act to the northeast wrestling territory. McMahon dismissed Kaufman's idea, as the elder McMahon was not about to bring "show business" into his pro wrestling promotion. Kaufman had by then developed a friendship with wrestling reporter/photographer Bill Apter. After many discussions about Kaufman's desire to be in the pro wrestling business, Apter called Memphis wrestling icon Jerry "The King" Lawler and introduced him to Kaufman by telephone.

Kaufman finally stepped into the ring (in the Memphis wrestling circuit) with a man—Lawler himself. Kaufman taunted the residents of Memphis by playing "videos showing residents how to use soap" and proclaiming the city to be "the nation's redneck capital". The ongoing Lawler–Kaufman feud, which often featured Jimmy Hart and other heels in Kaufman's corner, included a number of staged "works", such as a broken neck for Kaufman as a result of Lawler's piledriver and a famous on-air fight on a 1982 episode of Late Night with David Letterman.

For some time after that first match, Kaufman appeared wearing a neck brace, insisting that his injuries were much worse than they really were. Kaufman continued to defend the Inter-Gender Championship in the Mid-South Coliseum and offered an extra prize, other than the $1,000: that if he were pinned, the woman who pinned him would get to marry him and that Kaufman would also shave his head.

Eventually it was revealed that the feud and wrestling matches were staged works, and that Kaufman and Lawler were friends. This was not disclosed until more than 10 years after Kaufman's death, when the Emmy-nominated documentary A Comedy Salute to Andy Kaufman aired on NBC in 1995. (By this point, it was becoming common knowledge that professional wrestling was staged; McMahon's son of the same name had admitted as much to the New Jersey state athletic commission in 1989.) Jim Carrey, who revealed the secret, played Kaufman in the 1999 film Man on the Moon. In a 1997 interview, Lawler said he had improvised during their first match and the Letterman incident.

Although officials at St. Francis Hospital said Kaufman's neck injuries were real, in his 2002 biography It's Good to Be the King ... Sometimes, Lawler detailed how they came up with the angle and kept it quiet. Even though Kaufman's injury was legitimate, the pair exaggerated it. He also said that Kaufman's furious tirade and performance on Letterman was Kaufman's own idea, including when Lawler slapped Kaufman out of his chair. Promoter Jerry Jarrett later recalled that for two years he mailed Kaufman payments comparable to what other main-event wrestlers were getting at the time, but Kaufman never deposited the checks.

Kaufman appeared in the 1983 film My Breakfast with Blassie with professional wrestling personality "Classy" Freddie Blassie. The film was a parody of the art film My Dinner with Andre. Lynne Margulies, sister of the film's director, Johnny Legend, appears in it, and became romantically involved with Kaufman.

In 2002, Kaufman became a playable unlockable character in the video game Legends of Wrestling II and a standard character in 2004's Showdown: Legends of Wrestling. In 2008, Jakks Pacific produced for their WWE Classic Superstars toy line an action figure two-pack of Kaufman and Lawler, as well as a separate figure release with a royal blue robe.

On March 20, 2023, Kaufman was announced as the third inductee into the 2023 WWE Hall of Fame. He was inducted by Jimmy Hart.

== Personal life ==
Kaufman never married. His daughter, Maria Bellu-Colonna (born 1969), was the child of a relationship with a high-school girlfriend and was placed for adoption. Bellu-Colonna learned in 1992 that she was Kaufman's daughter when she traced her biological roots. She soon reunited with her mother, grandfather, uncle, and aunt. Bellu-Colonna's daughter Brittany briefly appeared in Man on the Moon, playing Kaufman's sister Carol as a young child.

In December 1969, Kaufman learned Transcendental Meditation at college. According to a BBC article, he used the technique "to build confidence and take his act to comedy clubs." For the rest of his life, Kaufman meditated and performed yoga three hours per day. From February to June 1971, he trained as a teacher of Transcendental Meditation in Mallorca, Spain.

Lynne Margulies, who met Kaufman during the filming of My Breakfast with Blassie, was in a relationship with Kaufman from 1982 until his death in 1984. Margulies later codirected the 1989 Kaufman wrestling compilation I'm from Hollywood, and published the 2009 book Dear Andy Kaufman, I Hate Your Guts!.

== Illness and death ==
At a Thanksgiving dinner on Long Island in November 1983, several family members expressed concern about Kaufman's persistent coughing. He claimed that he had been coughing for nearly a month, visited his doctor, and was told that nothing was wrong. When he returned to Los Angeles, he consulted another physician and then underwent a series of tests at Cedars-Sinai Medical Center. A few days later, he was diagnosed with large-cell carcinoma of the lung, typically associated with smoking.

After audiences were shocked by his gaunt appearance during January 1984 performances, Kaufman acknowledged that he had an unspecified illness that he hoped to cure with natural medicine, including a diet of all fruits and vegetables. He eventually underwent palliative radiotherapy, but by then the cancer had spread from his lungs to his brain. His final public appearance was at the premiere of My Breakfast with Blassie in March 1984, where he appeared thin and with a mohawk hair style (radiation treatments had caused the loss of his hair).

The next day, Kaufman and Margulies flew to Baguio, Philippines, where, as a last resort, he received treatments of a pseudoscientific procedure called psychic surgery (now recognized as explicitly deceptive medical fraud).

Afterward, Kaufman initially said that he felt better and returned to the US, but he died at Cedars-Sinai Medical Center in Los Angeles on May 16, 1984, aged 35. He is buried in Beth David Cemetery in Elmont, New York.

=== Death-hoax rumors ===
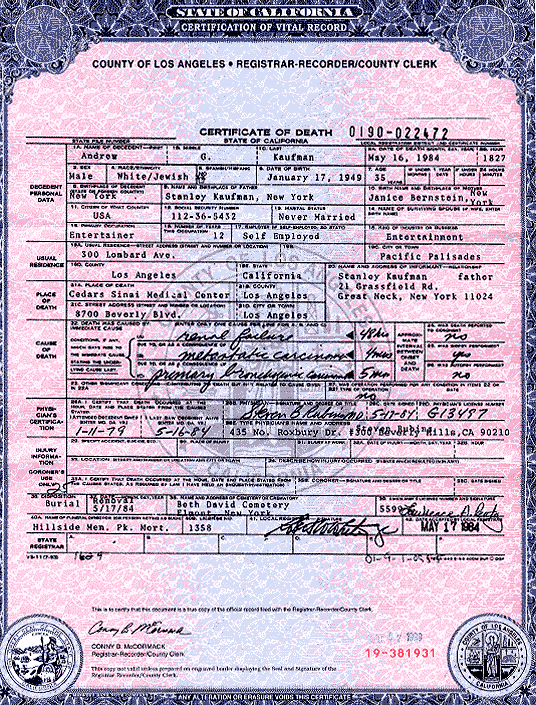
Kaufman's death certificate

Kaufman often spoke of faking his own death as a hoax. After his death, rumors persisted that he was still alive, often fueled by sporadic appearances of his character Tony Clifton at comedy clubs. Kaufman's website calls the faked death story an "urban legend" and includes a picture of his death certificate.

"Clifton" performed a year after Kaufman's death at The Comedy Store benefit in Kaufman's honor, with members of his entourage in attendance, and during the 1990s made several appearances at Los Angeles nightclubs. On the NBC special Comedy Salute to Andy Kaufman, Jim Carrey, who portrayed Kaufman in Man on the Moon, said that Bob Zmuda had been performing as Clifton.

In 2013, responding to rumors that Kaufman was still alive and following the appearance of an actress who claimed to be Kaufman's daughter, the Los Angeles County Coroner's office rereleased Kaufman's death certificate to confirm that he was indeed dead and had been interred at Beth David Cemetery.

In 2014, Zmuda and Margulies coauthored Andy Kaufman: The Truth, Finally, a book claiming that Kaufman's death was indeed a prank, and that he would soon reveal himself, as his upper limit on the "prank" was 30 years. Kaufman did not reappear.

== Legacy and tributes ==
Comedian Elayne Boosler, who dated and lived with Kaufman and credits him with encouraging her comedy career, wrote an article for Esquire in November 1984 in his memory. She also dedicated her 1986 Showtime special Party of One to Kaufman. An audio recording of Kaufman offering encouragement to Boosler is featured in the intro.

In 1992, the band R.E.M. released the song "Man on the Moon", a tribute to Kaufman. The song's video featured footage of Kaufman. On March 29, 1995, NBC aired A Comedy Salute to Andy Kaufman. The special featured clips of many of Kaufman's performances, as well as commentary by some of his friends, family and colleagues. During the special, comedian Richard Lewis said: "No one has ever done what Andy did, and did it as well, and no one will ever. Because he did it first. So did Buster Keaton, so did Andy." Carl Reiner recalled his distinction in the comedy world:

Did Andy influence comedy? No. Because nobody's doing what he did. Jim Carrey was influenced—not to do what Andy did, but to follow his own drummer. I think Andy did that for a lot of people. Follow your own drumbeat. You didn't have to go up there and say "take my wife, please". You could do anything that struck you as entertaining. It gave people freedom to be themselves.

Reiner also said of Kaufman: "Nobody can see past the edges, where the character begins and he ends."

Carrey portrayed Kaufman in the 1999 biopic film Man on the Moon, directed by Miloš Forman. The film took its title from R.E.M.'s song of the same name. R.E.M. also performed the score for the film and recorded another Kaufman tribute song, "The Great Beyond". Carrey's portrayal was met with critical acclaim, earning him a Golden Globe Award for his performance. Forman named his twin sons Andrew and James after Kaufman and Carrey. In July 2012, Kaufman's play Bohemia West was staged in Providence, Rhode Island. Comedian Vernon Chatman compiled and produced Kaufman's first album, Andy and His Grandmother, via Drag City in 2013.

Kaufman is one of the featured celebrities in the 2005 children's book Different Like Me: My Book of Autism Heroes. Actress Cindy Williams, who was a close friend of Kaufman, devoted an entire chapter of her autobiography, Shirley, I Jest!: A Storied Life, to him. The Chris Gethard Show paid homage to the Kaufman Fridays incident with comedian Brett Davis throwing water on someone's face.

A neon likeness of Kaufman is on display at The Comedy Store in Los Angeles. The club's menu features the Andy Kaufman Special, which consists of "two cookies and a glass of ice cold milk."

The Vic Ferrari Band took its name from Kaufman's Taxi character.

According to executive producer Bill Oakley, the 1996 The Simpsons episode "Bart the Fink", in which Krusty the Clown fakes his death, was partially inspired by the rumors of Kaufman's faked death.

Al Jean, cocreator of the animated series The Critic, has said that the first-season drawing of Jon Lovitz's character Jay Sherman was loosely based on Kaufman.

In 2015, a bottled fragrance called Andy Kaufman Milk & Cookies was created.

German filmmaker Maren Ade has said that her 2016 film Toni Erdmann, which was nominated for the Palme d'Or at the Cannes Film Festival, was partially inspired by Kaufman and Tony Clifton.

Since 2004, the Andy Kaufman Award competition has been held annually as "a showcase for promising cutting-edge artists with fresh and unconventional material, for those willing to take risks with an audience, and for those who do not define themselves by the typical conventions of comedy." Winners include Reggie Watts, Kristen Schaal, Brett Davis, Marcus Monroe, Brent Weinbach, Suzanne Whang, Nick Vatterott, Harry Terjanian, and Dru Johnston. For the 2015 Andy Kaufman Award show, Two Boots Pizza created a special Andy Kaufman pizza.

On June 20, 2019, it was announced that Kaufman would be honored with a posthumous star on the Hollywood Walk of Fame in the television category. He was part of the class of 2020.

The Russian band Korol' i Shut recorded the song "Endi Kaufman" on its album Teatr Demona. The group Gustaf released a cover of Kaufman's "I Trusted You", a four-minute song repeating those three words. The song was featured in an advertisement for the iPhone.

On March 20, 2023, Kaufman was inducted to the WWE Hall of Fame as part of the class of 2023.

Kaufman is played by Nicholas Braun in the film Saturday Night, which chronicles the production of the first episode of Saturday Night Live.

== Filmography ==
=== Television ===
Year	Title	Notes	Refs.
1972	Kennedy at Night	Kaufman's first appearance as Elvis	
1974	The Dean Martin Comedy World	1 episode; Kaufman's national television debut	
1974	The Joe Franklin Show	1 episode	
1975–1983	Saturday Night Live	16 episodes	
1976	Monty Hall's Variety Hour	Television film	
1976–1978	The Tonight Show Starring Johnny Carson	6 episodes	
1976	Van Dyke and Company	10 episodes	
1977–1978	The Mike Douglas Show	2 episodes	
1977–1979	Dinah!	3 episodes	
1978–1981	The Midnight Special	3 episodes	
1977	Stick Around	Television film	
1977	The Hollywood Squares	1 episode	
1977	The Redd Foxx Comedy Hour	1 episode	
1977	On Location: Second Annual HBO Young Comedians Show		
1978	Variety '77: The Year in Entertainment		
1978	Bananaz		
1978–1983	Taxi	114 episodes	
1978	The Dating Game	As contestant "Baji Kimran"	
1978	Dick Clark's Live Wednesday		
1979	Cher...And Other Fantasies		
1979	The Lisa Hartman Show		
1979	The Tomorrow Show		
1979–1982	Good Morning America	3 episodes	
1979	Andy's Funhouse	ABC special	
1979	Macy's Thanksgiving Day Parade		
1979	A Johnny Cash Christmas	Television special	
1979–1981	The Merv Griffin Show	3 episodes	
1980	Andy Kaufman at Carnegie Hall	Documentary	
1980	Uncle Andy's Funhouse (Buckshot segment)		
1980–1983	The David Letterman Show	12 episodes	
1981	Fridays	3 episodes	
1981	Barbara Mandrell and the Mandrell Sisters		
1981	The Slycraft Hour	New York City cable access show with Bob Pagani	
1981	An Evening at the Improv	Host	
1982	1981: The Year in Television		
1982	The John Davidson Show	1 episode	
1982	Hour Magazine	1 episode	
1982	The Fantastic Miss Piggy Show	Tony Clifton; television special	
1982	Catch a Rising Star's 10th Anniversary	Television special	
1983	The Andy Kaufman Show	PBS Soundstage	
1983	Superstars of Comedy Salute the Improv	Television film	
1983	CWA Wrestling	8 episodes	
1983	Rodney Dangerfield: I Can't Take It No More	Television special	
1984	The Top	Television film; Kaufman's final television appearance	

=== Film ===
Date	Title	Role	Notes	Refs.
1976	God Told Me To	Police Officer		
1980	In God We Tru$t	Armageddon T. Thunderbird		
1981	Heartbeeps	ValCom-17485		
1983	My Breakfast with Blassie	Himself	Final film role	
1986	Elayne Boosler: Party of One	Himself	Archived voice	
1989	I'm from Hollywood	Himself	Wrestling documentary	
1999	Man on the Moon	Voice	Archived singing	
2017	Jim & Andy: The Great Beyond	Himself	Archived footage and singing	
2020	Kaufmania	Himself	Archived footage, documentary with Fred Willard	
2023	Thank You Very Much	Himself	Archived footage, documentary	
2025	Andy Kaufman Is Me	Himself	Archived footage, documentary	

=== Home media ===
Year	Title	Studio	Formats	Ref.
1979	The Andy Kaufman Special (original TV title: Andy's Funhouse)	Fox Hills Video/Starz/Anchor Bay	VHS (1989, 1999)	
1979	The Real Andy Kaufman	Eclectic/Universal Music	DVD (2001) / streaming	
1980	Andy Kaufman Plays Carnegie Hall	Showtime/Paramount	VHS (2000)	
1981	Andy Kaufman: The Midnight Special	SMV	VHS (1999) / DVD (2000)	
1983	Soundstage: The Andy Kaufman Show	Vestron Video/Rhino Theatrical	Betamax (1985) / VHS (1993, 2000) / DVD (2000)	
1989	I'm from Hollywood	Rhino Theatrical	VHS (1992, 1999) / DVD (2000, 2007, 2009) / streaming	
1999	Tank You Vedy Much!	Inspired Corporation	VHS	
1999	Biography	A&E Home Video	VHS (2001) / DVD (1999)	
2008	The Death of Andy Kaufman	Wild Eye Releasing	DVD (2011) / streaming (2016)	
2010	World Inter-Gender Wrestling Champion: His Greatest Matches	Shout! Factory	DVD / streaming	
2020	Grandma Makes Andy Breakfast	AndyKaufman.com	DVD / download	
2020	Foreign Man	AndyKaufman.com	DVD / download	

== Discography ==
Year	Title	Studio	Formats	Ref.
2013	Andy and His Grandmother	Drag City	CD/LP/download	
2020	Conversations with Dad and Grandma	AndyKaufman.com	CD/download	
2020	Speakers' Corner	AndyKaufman.com	CD/download	

== Bibliography ==
Three books of Kaufman's writings have been posthumously published.

- Kaufman, Andy (1999). The Huey Williams Story. Zilch Publishing. ISBN 9781930410008. – A novel
- Kaufman, Andy (2000). God...and Other Plays. Zilch Publishing. ISBN 1930410018. – The script for a one-man play Kaufman performed in college
- Kaufman, Andy (2000). Poetry and Stories. Zilch Publishing. ISBN 1930410034. – A collection of his adolescent writings

== See also ==
- List of Jewish professional wrestlers
