= Latka Gravas =

Fictional character

- Taxi character
- Latka Gravas
- Created by: Andy Kaufman, James L. Brooks, Stan Daniels, David Davis, Ed. Weinberger
- Portrayed by: Andy Kaufman

In-universe information
- Gender: Male
- Occupation: Garage mechanic
- Spouse: Simka Dahblitz
- Relatives: Greta Gravas (mother)

Latka Gravas is a fictional character on the television sitcom Taxi portrayed by Andy Kaufman. A sweet-natured and lovable-but-goofy mechanic, Latka is an immigrant from an unspecified nation. He was based on a character Kaufman created known as Foreign Man.

== Development ==
In 1977, the producers of Taxi saw Kaufman's Foreign Man act at The Comedy Store. They had already created the main characters for the pilot, but they enjoyed Kaufman so much they immediately offered him a role based on the character. Kaufman was not a fan of sitcoms, but his manager, George Shapiro, convinced him that this would rocket him to stardom, where he would make a lot of money which he could then put into his own act, which became Andy's Funhouse. Kaufman agreed to appear as Latka in 14 episodes per season, approximately half of the entire series. In the show, Latka's home country is never disclosed (only referred to as "[Latka's] country" or "the old country"), and his native language is essentially gibberish, although a few words and phrases were consistently used. (Notably "Ibbi da" for "Yes" or "That is so".) Some fans have theorized that Latka may be from a fictional Baltic country-island named Caspiar, as "Foreign Man" was, but this was never addressed on Taxi.

== Awards ==
Kaufman was nominated for two Golden Globe Awards in 1979 and 1981 for his portrayal of Latka.

== Fictional biography ==
In the first season, Latka's knowledge of the English language is extremely limited, and almost all of his lines are in his own language, to the point that he speaks his own language to the other characters when they answer him in English. From the second season onwards, his English has greatly improved and he is able to speak fluently with the other characters, but still with a heavy accent. In the second season, Latka becomes acquainted with Simka Dahblitz (played by Carol Kane), a woman from his home country, and despite being from different ethnic groups who despise each other, Latka falls in love with Simka and they eventually get married (although in the first season, Latka marries an American prostitute strictly to avoid being deported back to his home country). Latka is also shown being visited by his mother Greta (played by Susan Kellermann), who develops an attraction to Alex Rieger, much to Latka's annoyance.

Latka's dissociative identity disorder was conceived late in the series as a result of Kaufman expressing boredom at portraying Latka. This allowed him to broaden his comedic abilities with alternate personas such as the womanising American Vic Ferrari, the cowboy Harlow, the elegant Englishman Sir Geoffrey, and even Alex Rieger. In these episodes, Latka's different personas have no idea that they are the same person, and Vic even talks about Latka as if he knows him personally. While he is Alex, Latka experiences Alex's problems in life and at one point even finds the right solution to them, but comically reverts to Latka before he can tell the real Alex. Around the same time as his marriage to Simka, Latka's alternate personalities are completely eradicated by Doctor Joyce Brothers and do not appear again for the remainder of the series.

In a two-part episode in the fifth season of the series, Latka is forced to have sex with a female co-worker in a cab stuck in a snowstorm, to prevent her from dying of hypothermia with his body heat, and their priest father Gorki instructs Simka in a counseling session to have sex with someone she works with, in order to "repair" their marriage. However, since she is a housewife she is instructed to do it with someone Latka works with, which befalls to Alex. When she cannot fulfill that, Simka and Latka comically divorce and subsequently marry again with a "clean slate".

== In other media ==
Latka Gravas appears in the second issue of Dean Motter's comic series Terminal City.

Latka Gravas also appears as an attire for Andy Kaufman in the video game Showdown: Legends of Wrestling.
