= My Breakfast with Blassie =

- Directed by: Linda Lautrec; Johnny Legend; Mark Shepard
- Written by: Linda Lautrec; Johnny Legend
- Produced by: Linda Lautrec; Johnny Legend
- Starring: Andy Kaufman; Freddie Blassie
- Music by: Linda Mitchell
- Distributed by: Artist Endeavours International
- Release date: 1983
- Running time: ~60 minutes
- Country: United States
- Language: English

My Breakfast with Blassie is a 1983 film starring Andy Kaufman and professional wrestler "Classy" Freddie Blassie.

The film is a mostly improvised parody of the art film My Dinner with Andre and is set in a Hollywood Sambo's restaurant where Kaufman and Blassie have a discussion over breakfast. Lynne Margulies, who would later become Kaufman's girlfriend, plays a role. Also featured is Bob Zmuda, who plays a nosy fan.

My Breakfast with Blassie was conceived of by Linda Lautrec and Johnny Legend as a satire on My Dinner with Andre. Linda Lautrec and Andy Kaufman loosely scripted the film over several months late at night on the telephone. Linda's dual role (as director and actress) was scripted as an irritating fan who requests Andy's autograph after he washes his hands.

My Breakfast with Blassie is referenced in the R.E.M. song and tribute to Kaufman, "Man on the Moon".
