= Bob Zmuda =

American writer, comedian, producer and director

- Born: December 12, 1949 (age 76); Chicago, Illinois, U.S.
- Occupations: Comedian, writer, producer, director
- Years active: 1970s–present

Bob Zmuda (born December 12, 1949) is an American writer, comedian, producer, and director best known for his collaboration with comedian Andy Kaufman.

== Biography ==
Zmuda occasionally portrayed Kaufman's Tony Clifton character on stage and for television appearances. In a 2006 interview, Zmuda told the Opie and Anthony Show that he was masquerading as Tony Clifton with David Letterman, and that Letterman did not find out until years later.

In 1986, Zmuda founded the American version of Comic Relief, an annual event that raises money to help the homeless. The event was televised on HBO, and was hosted by comedians Robin Williams, Billy Crystal and Whoopi Goldberg.

In 1999, Zmuda wrote a book about Kaufman's life, titled Andy Kaufman Revealed!, which purported to unveil many tricks and hoaxes that the two pulled off in front of audiences and television cameras in the 1980s. One critic praised the book as "the ultimate insider's look at Kaufman's life," while some of Kaufman's fans and members of Kaufman's family criticized it for inaccuracies about Kaufman.

Later that year, Miloš Forman directed Man on the Moon, the story of Kaufman's life. Zmuda created the "Tony Clifton" makeup for the film, and made a brief appearance portraying comedian Jack Burns, a producer that gets into a brawl on stage during one of Kaufman's appearances on the 1980–82 ABC late night comedy show, Fridays. Zmuda was also Man on the Moon's co-executive producer. On camera, the character of Bob Zmuda was played by Paul Giamatti. Stanley Kaufman, Andy's father, criticized Zmuda's influence on the film shortly after its release, writing in the form of Andy speaking from beyond the grave.

Sam Simon, executive producer on Taxi, revealed in a 2013 interview with Marc Maron for the WTF Podcast that the portrayal of Andy on the show was "a complete fiction" largely created by Zmuda, who he maintained has a "vested interest" in creating stories about Kaufman. In the interview Simon stated that Kaufman was "completely professional" and that he "told you Tony Clifton was he", but conceded that Kaufman would have "loved" Zmuda's version of events.

In 2014, Zmuda co-authored another book with new anecdotes about Kaufman's desire to fake his death entitled Andy Kaufman: The Truth, Finally, which states that Kaufman's death was indeed a prank. Zmuda says that Kaufman is still alive and that Kaufman would soon be revealing himself as his upper limit on the prank was thirty years. Zmuda now states that Kaufman offered to leave him money since Zmuda's career was largely dependent on Kaufman performing but he turned it down because he believed it would implicate him in a crime. The terms of the book deal were not disclosed.

On November 7, 2014, Zmuda appeared as a guest on Greg Fitzsimmons' podcast, Fitzdog Radio. During the interview, Zmuda claimed to have invested $50,000 in the new book. He stormed off the podcast after Fitzsimmons doubted Zmuda's intentions regarding claims of Kaufman's staged death.

On November 16, 2014, a post on the Tony Clifton Facebook page claimed that Zmuda had died at the Moonlite BunnyRanch, sourcing the information to a UPI article. The same day, the BunnyRanch tweeted that they had been asked by Zmuda's management not to comment, with a link to the hoax Facebook story.

Two days later, comedy news website The Interrobang posted a story with photos, verifying that Zmuda was not dead. Later that day, UPI posted a story, confirming the hoax.

== Filmography ==
- Andy's Funhouse (1977) TV
- Andy Kaufman Plays Carnegie Hall (1979) video
- My Breakfast with Blassie (1983) film
- D.C. Cab (1983) film
- Comic Relief (1986) cable TV special
- I'm from Hollywood (1989) TV special
- Batman Forever (1995) film
- Man on the Moon (1999) film
- Andy Kaufman's Really Big Show (1999) TV special
- The Number 23 (2007) film
- Saint Bernard (2013) horror film
- Jim & Andy: The Great Beyond (2017) documentary film
