= Jim & Andy: The Great Beyond =

Jim & Andy: The Great Beyond – Featuring a Very Special, Contractually Obligated Mention of Tony Clifton
- Film poster
- Directed by: Chris Smith
- Produced by: Brendan Fitzgerald; Danny Gabai; Spike Jonze; Chris Smith
- Starring: Jim Carrey
- Cinematography: Brantley Gutierrez
- Edited by: Barry Poltermann
- Production company: VICE Films
- Distributed by: Netflix
- Release dates: September 5, 2017 (Venice Film Festival); November 17, 2017 (United States)
- Running time: 94 minutes
- Country: United States
- Language: English

Jim & Andy: The Great Beyond – Featuring a Very Special, Contractually Obligated Mention of Tony Clifton (or simply Jim & Andy: The Great Beyond) is a 2017 American documentary film directed by Chris Smith. The film follows actor Jim Carrey as he remains in character as Andy Kaufman during the production of the 1999 film Man on the Moon, directed by Miloš Forman. It was released on November 17, 2017, through the streaming service Netflix.

== Synopsis ==
The film alternates between contemporary interviews with Carrey and firsthand footage of the making of Man on the Moon almost 20 years earlier. According to Carrey, Universal Pictures had withheld the behind-the-scenes footage (much of it originally shot by Kaufman's former girlfriend, Lynne Margulies) "so that people wouldn't think [he] was an asshole".

The basic premise is that while making the film, Carrey is so committed to the role that, like Andy, he had difficulty separating himself from the character. Carrey's performance becomes so real that people who had known Andy, even family and others close to him, felt like they had him with them again.

== Release ==
The film premiered at the Venice Film Festival in September 2017. Later that month, streaming service Netflix acquired the film's distribution rights after a screening at the Toronto Film Festival. The film was released on November 17, 2017.

== Reception ==
On the review aggregator website Rotten Tomatoes, 92% of 50 critics' reviews are positive, with an average rating of 7.4/10. The website's consensus reads: "Jim & Andy: The Great Beyond offers a fascinating behind-the-scenes glimpse of method acting in action – and one star's journey toward something like personal acceptance." Metacritic, which uses a weighted average, assigned the film a score of 77 out of 100, based on 16 critics, indicating "generally favorable" reviews.

In The Guardian's review, the film was awarded 4 out of 5 stars. Though the reviewer believed director Chris Smith did not quite succeed in knitting "all the elements of an inquiry into the madness behind fame, art, performance and the issue of when a joke has gone 'too far'", he found that it was still "an extremely watchable movie" and was "marvellously entertaining".
