= Louise Lasser =

American actress (1939–2026)

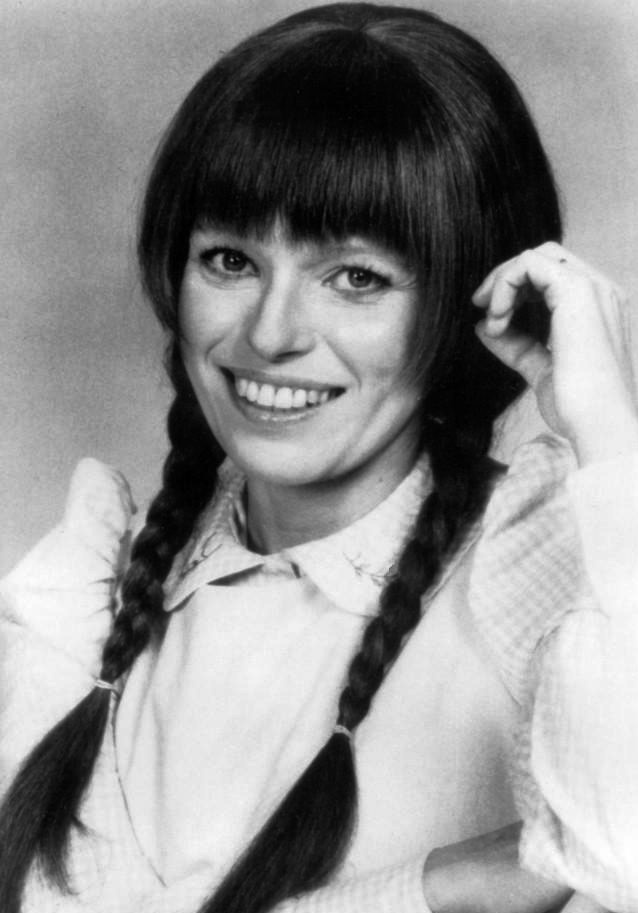
- Lasser as Mary Hartman in 1976
- Born: Louise Jane Lasser; April 11, 1939; New York City, U.S.
- Died: July 6, 2026 (aged 87); New York City, U.S.
- Education: Brandeis University
- Occupations: Actress; television writer; teacher; director
- Years active: 1962–2022
- Spouse: Woody Allen (m. 1966; div. 1970)

Louise Jane Lasser (April 11, 1939 – July 6, 2026) was an American actress, television writer, and performing arts teacher and director. She was known for her portrayal of the title character on the soap opera satire Mary Hartman, Mary Hartman, for which she was nominated for a Primetime Emmy Award.

Lasser made her Broadway debut in the musical I Can Get It for You Wholesale (1962). She was married to Woody Allen from 1966 until 1970 and acted in several of his early films, including Take the Money and Run (1969) and Bananas (1971). Lasser hosted Saturday Night Live in 1976 and had guest roles on The Bob Newhart Show, The Mary Tyler Moore Show, Taxi, Laverne and Shirley, and St. Elsewhere.

Lasser's later roles included black comedy films such as Todd Solondz's Happiness (1998) and Owen Kline's Funny Pages (2022). She portrayed Beadie in the Lena Dunham-created HBO coming-of-age series Girls from 2013 to 2014.

Lasser was also a life member of The Actors Studio and studied with both Sanford Meisner and Robert X. Modica.

== Early life and education ==
Born in New York City, Lasser was the only child of Paula Lasser (née Cohen) and Sol Jay Lasser. Her father wrote and published the Everyone's Income Tax Guide series in the 1970s and 1980s. Louise did not fully embrace her Jewish heritage until later in life. Her mother's emotional instability led to a 1961 suicide attempt that was thwarted by Louise herself. Her mother vowed never to forgive Lasser for her actions; after divorcing her husband, she committed suicide in 1964. Sol Jay Lasser later also died by suicide.

Lasser studied political science at Brandeis University for three years.

== Career ==
=== 1962–1975: Collaborations with Woody Allen ===
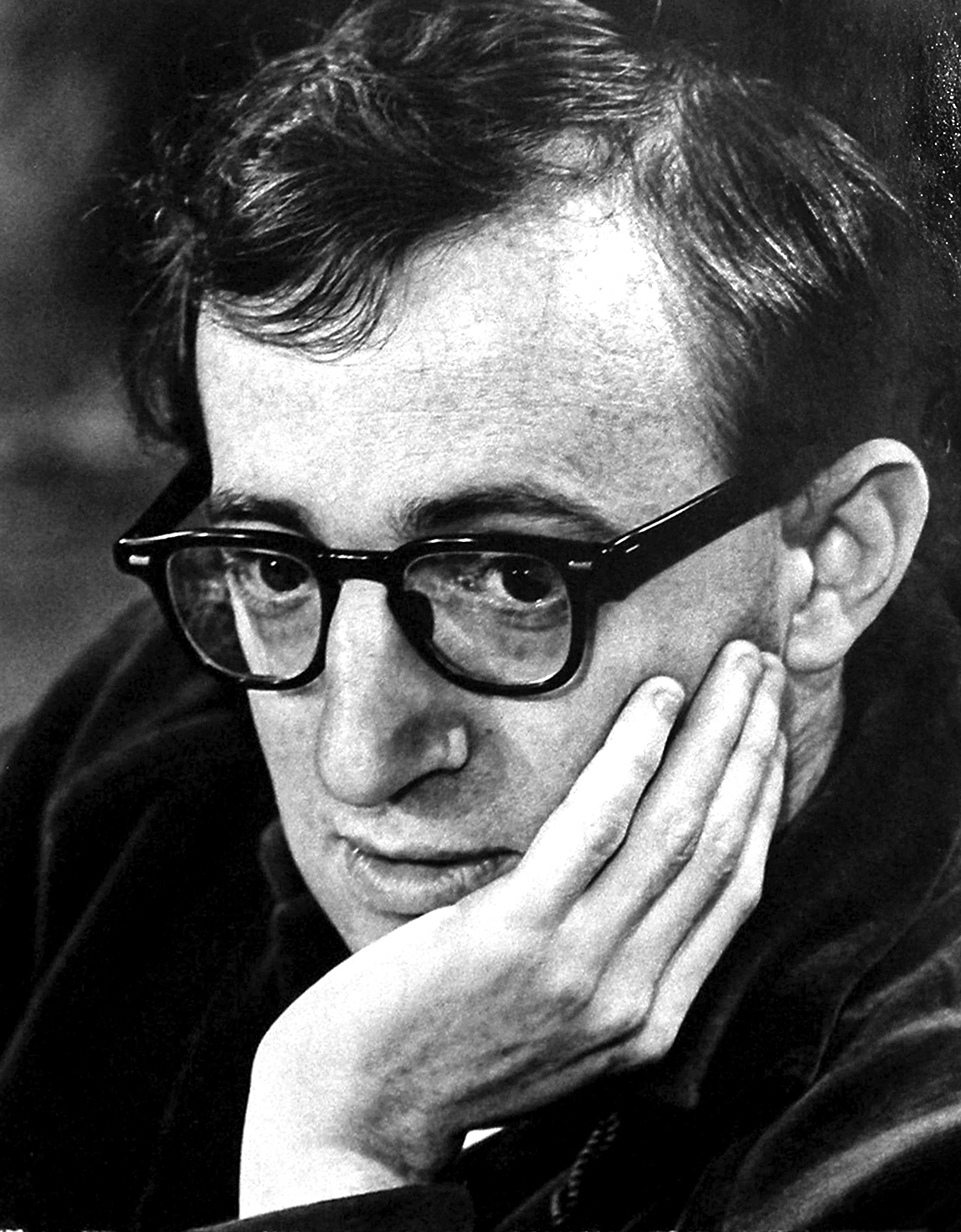
Lasser was married to Woody Allen and acted in several of his films

Lasser began her career acting in Greenwich Village coffee shops and bars and performed in improvisational revues before understudying Barbra Streisand as Miss Marmelstein in the Broadway musical I Can Get It for You Wholesale. She also acted on the soap opera The Doctors and in television commercials. In 1967, Lasser became the first woman to win a Clio Award for Best Actress in a Commercial.

She acted in numerous Woody Allen films, including his early slapstick comedies Take the Money and Run (1969), Bananas (1971), and Everything You Always Wanted to Know About Sex* (*But Were Afraid to Ask) (1972). She also served as a voice actor for Allen's 1966 spoof dubbing of the Japanese comedy spy movie Kokusai himitsu keisatsu: Kagi no kagi (International Secret Police: Key of Keys), retitled What's Up, Tiger Lily?

Lasser cited Allen as "a tremendous influence — but it's the influence to make me be me.... I remember the day he said, 'I do jokes ... your comedy is attitude.'" In 2013, when speaking to Interview, she said: "I love his work. That relationship was a very influential relationship, on every level. It's interesting to see that. I'll forever be influenced by his work. A lot of my best work comes from his work. Some meaning and some not even meaning to."

Her other 1970s comedic turns in cinema include Such Good Friends (1971) and Slither (1973).

Allen wrote an unaired TV pilot called The Laughmakers (1962), starring Lasser and Alan Alda as improvisational comics. Lasser and Alda were also paired in James L. Brooks' 1972 unsold pilot Class of '55, and they later worked together in the 1973 TV movie mystery Isn't It Shocking?

On television, she also earned credits on Love, American Style (1971), The Bob Newhart Show (1972), and The Mary Tyler Moore Show (1973). She appeared in the 1973 TV-movie version of Ingmar Bergman's The Lie and was featured as Elaine in an episode of the NBC romantic anthology series Love Story.

=== 1976–1977: Breakthrough ===
==== Mary Hartman, Mary Hartman ====
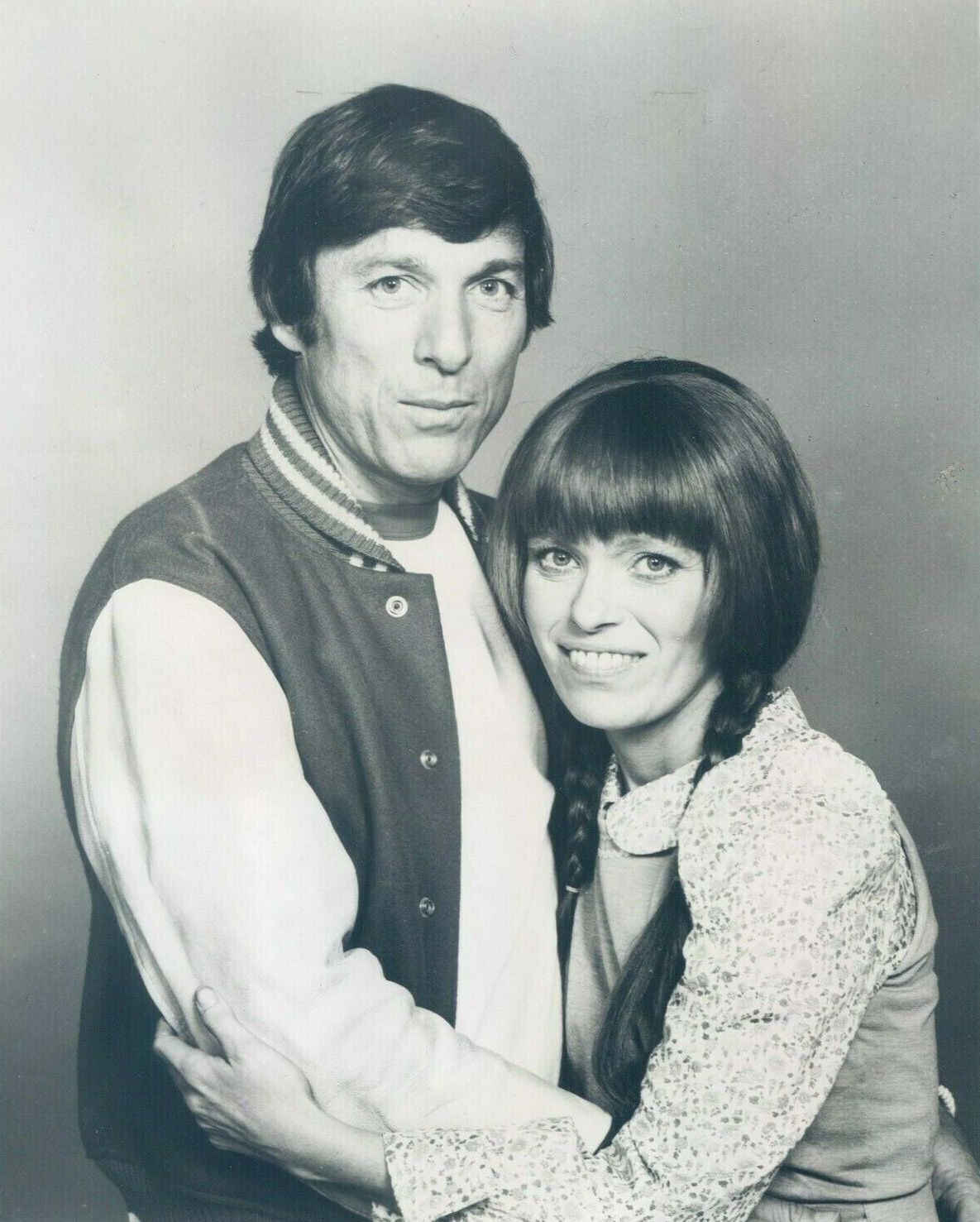
Lasser with costar Greg Mullavey in a 1976 press photo for Mary Hartman, Mary Hartman

Lasser's breakthrough role came as the unhappy, neurotic titular character in the soap opera satire Mary Hartman, Mary Hartman, which aired five nights a week for two seasons from January 1976 until July 1977. Some markets aired it at different times of the day and night and also in a block format that showcased all the week's episodes in a row.

During the program's run, Lasser became a household name and appeared on the covers of Newsweek, People and Rolling Stone.

In his biography, producer Norman Lear said that the casting of Lasser took less than a minute after Charles H. Joffe told him that there was only one actress to play the part of Mary Hartman. Lasser initially refused the role but later acquiesced. Lear said that "when she read a bit of the script for me, I all but cried for joy ... Louise brought with her the persona that fit Mary Hartman like a corset."

Of her brief yet memorable time on the series, Lasser surmised: "I could go into anyone's kitchen in America and have dinner. It was the best and worst of times." Of her beleaguered alter ego Mary, Lasser remarked: "She was like a survivor that lived in a world that might not be worth surviving in."

Exhausted from the grueling schedule demands, Lasser left the series after two seasons and 325 episodes.

The serial was rebranded Forever Fernwood, which centered on the lives of the other Mary Hartman, Mary Hartman characters and lasted for 26 more weeks. In an interview for the bonus features of the Mary Hartman, Mary Hartman DVD box set from Shout! Factory, Lasser revealed that the idea for Mary's nervous breakdown at the end of the first season came after she wrote a 12-page letter suggesting the idea to Norman Lear.

==== Saturday Night Live host ====
On July 24, 1976, Lasser hosted the penultimate episode of Saturday Night Live's first season. Her performance is best known for her opening monologue in which she re-created a Mary Hartman-esque nervous breakdown and locked herself in her dressing room. She is then coaxed out by Chevy Chase/Land Shark and the promise of appearing on the cover of Time. Some reports claim that Lasser's erratic behavior on the show led to her being the first person banned from SNL. Chase accused her of "solipsism", and SNL writer Michael O'Donoghue called her "clinically berserk" and allegedly walked off that week's installment in disgust. O'Donoghue did concede that Lasser "was a nice woman going through a few problems, but I wanted to force her to eat her goddamn pigtails at gunpoint".

Lasser denied that she was ever forbidden to come back. According to Lasser, she was initially told she would be able to write her own material, but that promise was later withdrawn, and she also refused to do sketches she deemed "salacious"; one in particular featured Lasser and Gilda Radner as teenagers talking about male genitalia. Ultimately, Jane Curtin appeared in the sketch with Radner instead. Lasser also asserted that her SNL antics, which included stream-of-consciousness rambling (typical of her Mary Hartman character), were "on purpose" and that Lorne Michaels pulled repeats of the broadcast only at her manager's request because her manager was not fond of the whole affair, including the final segment in which the actress sat onstage to discuss her rise to fame and the dollhouse incident. Lasser mostly performed by herself on the program but also appears in a vignette with a dog at a table.

Lasser called Chase "like-a-bully mean" but Radner "a doll"; but aside from the intro segment in which Radner and Dan Aykroyd knock on her changing room door, Chase was the only regular player with whom Lasser had any scenes. Lasser and Chase appear as lovers in an Ingmar Bergman parody; plus, the pair filmed a sequence at the 1976 Democratic National Convention (although the footage was never aired). Instead, there is a video short in a diner in which she and her partner, played by Alan Zweibel, try to break up but forget their lines; in the end, Lasser moves to the bar and sits next to Michael Sarrazin. Lorne Michaels also briefly shows up in the clip, which ends with "a film by Louise Lasser" credit. According to Lasser, "For me to threaten to walk off the show, I would never do that for spite. Banned—that's a horrible thing to have said." Mary Hartman, Mary Hartman producer Norman Lear and co-star Mary Kay Place also hosted SNL during the run of Mary Hartman, Mary Hartman.

=== Later roles: 1978–2022 ===
Following her departure from Mary Hartman, Mary Hartman, Lasser wrote a made-for-TV movie titled Just Me and You (1978) and starred in it with Charles Grodin. Her post-Mary Hartman, Mary Hartman stage credits include A Coupla White Chicks Sitting Around Talking and Marie and Bruce (1980). She had a recurring role as Alex's ex-wife on the hit series Taxi and starred in the 1981–1982 season of It's a Living, in which she played waitress Maggie McBurney.

Lasser had a recurring role on St. Elsewhere in the mid-1980s as Victor Ehrlich's Aunt Charise, a neurotic comic character. Her 1980s film appearances included Stardust Memories (1980), In God We Tru$t (1980), Crimewave (1985), Blood Rage (1987), Surrender (1987), Rude Awakening (1989) and as the mother of the main character in Sing (1989).

Her 1990s films included Frankenhooker (1990), The Night We Never Met (1993), Sudden Manhattan (1996), Layin' Low (1996), and as the mother of the three main female characters in Todd Solondz's film Happiness (1998). Lasser won the National Board of Review Award for Best Acting by an Ensemble for her participation in the film Happiness.

She appeared in Mystery Men (1999) as the mother of Hank Azaria's character. She also had roles in Darren Aronofsky's film Requiem for a Dream (2000), the romantic comedy Fast Food Fast Women (2000), and co-starred with Renée Taylor in National Lampoon's Gold Diggers (2003).

Lasser acted in two episodes of HBO's Girls as a Manhattan artist for the series's third season (2014). Her last television performance, in 2018, was in the movie Did You Know My Husband?, in which she appeared alongside her longtime partner, Michael Citriniti.

In 2021, she was reunited with her Mary Hartman co-star Greg Mullavey in a 16-minute film short called Bliss.

In 2022, she appeared in Funny Pages, her first role in a theatrical feature film in almost 20 years. Chris Feil of The Daily Beast wrote, "Louise Lasser makes for what is surely the most hilariously bizarre, yet downright frightening, one-scene-wonder".

== Personal life, teaching and directing ==
In addition to being an actress, Lasser was a faculty member of HB Studio, where she taught acting technique, and she eventually ran her own Louise Lasser Acting Studio on the Upper East Side. In 2014, she directed the Off-Off-Broadway production of Ira Lewis's Chinese Coffee.

=== Marriage and relationships ===
Lasser married Woody Allen in 1966. They had no children together. Although the couple divorced in 1970, she appeared in five of his films from 1966 to 1980. She said of working with Allen, "I think he's very talented, and really funny, and really serious". Allen, in turn, called Lasser “charming, smart as a whip, quick, very funny and witty”.

Lasser never remarried, but her longtime partner was film producer Michael Citriniti.

=== The dollhouse incident ===
In the spring of 1976, Lasser was arrested at a Los Angeles charity boutique. Police found $6 worth (or 88 milligrams) of cocaine in her purse. Authorities were called after Lasser's American Express card was denied and she refused to leave without possession of a $150 dollhouse. Lasser was initially apprehended for two unpaid traffic tickets (one for jaywalking), but the officers then found the cocaine in her handbag. She claimed a fan had given her the drug several months earlier.

Lasser was ordered to six months in counseling, which was easily satisfied as she was already seeing an analyst. A fictionalized version of the "dollhouse incident" was also incorporated into Mary Hartman's first season.

In a 2013 interview with Claire Barliant, Lasser conceded: "I had taken cocaine. And especially that year....It seemed like a fun high, because I was so down, but it never worked that great for me."

=== Dark humor of MH2 ===
Lasser once remarked of MH2's dark humor: "I had to instinctively go to the dark side. I know people think it was this very light, funny show, and it was this funny show, but the humor came from a great angst inside."

== Death and tributes ==
Lasser died at her home in Manhattan on July 6, 2026, at the age of 87.

On social media, Girls creator Lena Dunham called Lasser "a canon, the prototype...one of the best". Lasser's friend and co-star Renée Taylor quipped on Instagram: "She’s busy keeping God laughing forever." Claudia Lamb, who played Lasser's daughter on MH2, wrote: "I am stunned and grieving. Louise Lasser is no longer with us. Raise a glass to the genius who created Mary Hartman and her waxy yellow build-up."

== Legacy and influence ==
Mary Hartman, Mary Hartman offers "Kitchen Sink Theater of the Absurd" featuring a Candide-esque TV-watching housewife who, in one signature episode, brings a sick neighbor a bowl of chicken soup, only to have him fall asleep and drown in it.

Of this post-Watergate, existential satirical comedy-drama, author Claire Barliant writes: "It’s both ahead of its time and decidedly of it"; while Lasser herself said, "People always say it’s way ahead of its time. I never thought it was ahead of its time. I always thought it was of its time."

In 1976, Ted Morgan wrote in The New York Times: "No longer merely a television program, Mary Hartman, Mary Hartman has become a cultural event...to help us explain ourselves."

Critic Matthew Eng adds that MH2 has "all the audacity and agitation of American cinema’s most daring decade, packaged into the prodigious shape of an oddly acted, garishly designed, choppily edited serial."

Claire Barliant further observes: "The seventies nervous breakdown coincides with women's lib and a strengthening gay rights movement. MH2 is relevant today because it entertains but still shocks, because the social commentary and satire and bravery of the show are as fresh as ever."

Eng elaborates: "Beyond the sharp but shaded social commentary, however, Mary Hartman is perhaps most indelible...as a stark, sobering, and admirably unsentimental psychological portrait of a basket case of a woman whom we aren’t meant to root for and who isn’t required to charm us. Instead, we watch her gradually deteriorate, episode by episode, night by night."

Lasser herself also became a cultural touchstone. As the series' figurehead, she aptly embodied both the insanity and enlightenment of the epoch; Eng also asserts: "Brought to raw, foggy life by the truly idiosyncratic talents of Woody Allen's proto-muse, Louise Lasser, Mary Hartman became a surprise cult icon." Barliant agrees: "Lasser was perfectly cast in the role, with her New York accent...doll-like dress...[and] with a bewildered 'how did I get here?' air."

“It was certainly one of the darkest, most satirical shows ever seen on television, and the fact that it premiered during America’s bicentennial year makes it even more significant,” notes Ron Simon of the Paley Center for Media. Media scholar Robert Thompson further maintains: “For those who revisit the show now, it stands as a time capsule of just how brilliant and sophisticated television could be.”

Greg Mullavey, who played Lasser's husband on MH2, contends: "Most of the critics loved us, because the show demonstrated that innovation and a different approach to storytelling is what you have to take a chance on, even though it often comes with great risks."

In 2000, Lasser appeared on a panel with her former Mary Hartman, Mary Hartman cast and crew members at the Paley Center for Media in Beverly Hills. The seminar, entitled Mary Hartman, Mary Hartman: Reunion, Reunion, was moderated by Steven A. Bell and taped for the museum archives.

In 2004 and 2007, Mary Hartman, Mary Hartman was ranked No. 21 and No. 26 on TV Guide's Top Cult Shows Ever.

== Filmography ==
=== Film ===
Year	Title	Role	Notes	Ref.
1966	What's Up, Tiger Lily?	Suki Yaki	Voice; also writing credit	
1969	Take the Money and Run	Kay Lewis		
1971	Bananas	Nancy		
1971	Such Good Friends	Marcy		
1972	Everything You Always Wanted to Know About Sex* (*But Were Afraid to Ask)	Gina		
1973	Slither	Mary Fenaka		
1978	Just Me and You	Jane Alofsin	Also writer, TV film	
1980	Simon	Doris	Uncredited, Voice	
1980	Stardust Memories	Sandy's Secretary	Uncredited	
1980	In God We Trust (Or Gimme That Prime Time Religion)	Mary		
1985	Crimewave	Helene Trend		
1987	Blood Rage (aka Nightmare at Shadow Woods)	Maddy		
1987	Surrender	Joyce		
1989	Sing	Rosie		
1989	Rude Awakening	Ronnie Summers		
1996	Layin' Low	Mrs. Muckler		
1996	Sudden Manhattan	Dominga		
1998	Happiness	Mona Jordan		
1999	Mystery Men	Blue Raja's Mother		
2000	Requiem for a Dream	Ada		
2000	Fast Food Fast Women	Emily		
2001	Queenie in Love	Martha		
2002	Wolves of Wall Street	Landlady		
2003	National Lampoon's Gold Diggers	Doris Mundt		
2008	Broadway Bound	Dorthy Palmer	Short film	
2010	Horses Eat Each Other	Irma	Short film	
2012	Driving Me Crazy: Proof of Concept	Shelly Petterson		
2021	Bliss		Short film	
2022	Funny Pages	Linda (Pharmacy Lady)		

=== Television ===
Year	Title	Role	Notes	Ref.
1962	The Laughmakers	Susan	TV film	
1963–1971	The Tonight Show Starring Johnny Carson	Herself	8 episodes	
1965	The Doctors	Jackie Ricardo	Episode: "#1.546 - May 3, 1965"	
1971	Love, American Style	Agatha Mulvy	Episode: "Love and the Plumber"	
1971–1973	The Mike Douglas Show	Herself	3 episodes	
1972	The Bob Newhart Show	Mrs. Radford	Episode: "P-I-L-O-T"	
1972	Class of '55	Christine	TV film	
1973	The Mary Tyler Moore Show	Anne Adams	Episode: "Mary Richards and the Incredible Plant Lady"	
1973	Coffee, Tea or Me?	Susan Edmonds	TV film	
1973	Isn't It Shocking?	Blanche	TV film	
1973	Love Story	Elaine Kaplan	Episode: "The Roller Coaster Stops Here"	
1974	McCloud	Sgt. Maggie Philbin	Episode: "A Cowboy in Paradise"	
1974	Moe and Joe	Mo Lambert	TV film	
1975	Medical Center	Esther Kornblum	Episode: "The Price of a Child"	
1976–1977	Mary Hartman, Mary Hartman	Mary Shumway Hartman	315 episodes	
1976	Saturday Night Live	Guest host	Episode: "Louise Lasser / Preservation Hall Jazz Band"	
1980–1982	Taxi	Phyllis Bornstein Consuelos; Phyllis Reiger	3 Episodes	
1981	For Ladies Only	Beth Doyle	TV film	
1981–1982	It's a Living	Maggie McBurney	14 Episodes	
1983	Laverne & Shirley	Sister Margaret	Episode: "The Monastery Show"	
1983	Late Night with David Letterman	Herself	Episode: "Edwin Newman / Louise Lasser"	
1984	Bedrooms	Betty / Loretta	TV film	
1984	St. Elsewhere	Aunt Charise	2 episodes	
1992	Empty Nest	Louise Polsky	Episode: "Good Neighbor Harry"	
2011	Woody Allen: A Documentary	Herself	American Masters documentary	
2014–2015	Girls	Beadie	3 episodes	
2018	Did You Know My Husband?		TV film	

=== Theatre ===
Year	Title	Role	Venue	Ref.
1962	I Can Get It For You Wholesale	Rosaline (replacement); Miss Marmelstein (u/s & replacement)	Sam S. Shubert Theatre, Broadway	
1967	Henry, Sweet Henry	Stella	Palace Theatre, Broadway	
1970	The Chinese	Gladys Hoffman	Ethel Barrymore Theatre, Broadway	
1974	Thieves	Nancy (replacement)	Broadhurst Theatre, Broadway	

== Awards and recognition ==
In 1967, Lasser became the first woman to win a Clio Award for Best Actress in a Commercial. She was nominated for an Emmy Award for her performance in Mary Hartman, Mary Hartman and won the National Board of Review Award for Best Acting by an Ensemble for her participation in the film Happiness.
