= Happening (disambiguation) =

A happening is a performance, event or situation meant to be considered art.

Happening, Happenings, or The Happening may also refer to:

== Music ==
- The Happenings, an American pop music group that originated in the 1960s

=== Albums ===
- Happenings (Hank Jones and Oliver Nelson album) (1966)
- Happenings (Bobby Hutcherson album) (1966)
- Happenings (Kasabian album) (2024)

=== Songs ===
- "The Happening" (song), a song by the Supremes from the 1967 film
- "Happening" (song), a 2012 song by Medina from Forever
- "The Happening", a 1990 song by the Pixies from Bossanova

== Films ==
- The Happening (1967 film), a comedy film starring Anthony Quinn
  - The Happening (1967 soundtrack)
- The Happening (2008 film), a film by M. Night Shyamalan
  - The Happening (2008 soundtrack)
- Happening (film), a 2021 film by Audrey Diwan based on the 2000 book

== Other ==
- Happening (book), a 2000 book by Annie Ernaux
- Happening (TV series), an Australian music television program

== See also ==
- "The Fappening", another name for 2014 celebrity nude photo leak, also known as "Celebgate"
