= Just Me and You (1978 film) =

- Genre: Comedy
- Written by: Louise Lasser
- Directed by: John Erman
- Starring: Louise Lasser; Charles Grodin
- Music by: Fred Karlin
- Country of origin: United States
- Original language: English

Production
- Executive producer: Roger Gimbel
- Producer: William S. Gilmore
- Cinematography: Gayne Rescher
- Editor: Tina Hirsch
- Running time: 100 minutes
- Production companies: EMI Television; Roger Gimbel Productions

Original release
- Network: NBC
- Release: May 22, 1978

Just Me and You is a 1978 American made-for-television comedy film written by Louise Lasser and directed by John Erman.

== Plot ==
The film is a gentle comedy about two strangers with personal family issues who drive across wintery America after Michael Lindsay (Charles Grodin) offers a lift to Jane Alofsin (Lasser) and how they gradually get to know each other. Jane is a little neurotic and very indecisive while Charles is more focused.

== Cast ==
- Louise Lasser as Jane Alofsin
- Charles Grodin as Michael Lindsay
- Michael Alldredge as Max
- Miriam Byrd-Nethery as Connie
- Noble Willingham as Gas Station Owner
- Julie Bovasso as Waitress
- Paul Fix as The Old Man
- Dave Thomas

== Production ==
Lasser wrote the script in the period between shooting the Mary Hartman, Mary Hartman pilot and filming the series. "My biggest fear was that I would write like Woody but I came out sounding like me," she said.

Lasser said she "wasn't a writer" but wrote 300 pages of "dialogue scenes" between a boy and a girl. These were read by Deanne Barkley who was developing script for the Robert Stigwood Organization. She suggested Lasser write up her pages as a script and gave her the basic plot line. Lasser rewrote the script accordingly.

Mary Hartman became a big success. Lasser wanted to move into writing and directing. She quit the show and took five months to recover. She then signed a three-picture deal with NBC, to write and star in one film, star in another and direct in a third. The first film was Just Me and You.

Deanne Barkley had moved to NBC by this time. She got Lasser to rewrite the project under the guidance of Roger Gimbel of EMI TV. She worked on the male part to get the interest of Charles Grodin. "It was the part I wanted to play," she said later. "I love that part. The woman - I don't understand her."

The film was shot entirely in California, with various locations such as Joshua Tree doubling for the rest of the US.

== Reception ==
The Los Angeles Times said the film contained "the funniest outpouring of dialogue this side of Woody Allen."
