= Ann Marcus =

American screenwriter

- Born: Dorothy Ann Goldstone; August 22, 1921; Little Falls, New York, US
- Died: December 3, 2014 (aged 93); Sherman Oaks, California, US
- Occupations: Writer; producer
- Years active: 1959–1997; 2008
- Spouse: Ellis Marcus (11 June 1944 – 23 June 1990)
- Children: 3

Ann Marcus (August 22, 1921 – December 3, 2014) was an American television writer and film producer.

She graduated from Western College for Women, worked for the New York Daily News and Life, where she worked with famed photographers such as Alfred Eisenstadt. In 2007, she was executive producer of the independent feature film, For Heaven's Sake.

== Television writing credits ==
- Lassie
- The Hathaways
- Please Don't Eat the Daisies
- The Debbie Reynolds Show
- Gentle Ben
- Peyton Place
- General Hospital
- Love Is a Many Splendored Thing
- Search for Tomorrow
- Mary Hartman, Mary Hartman
- Fernwood 2-Nite
- All That Glitters
- Julie Farr, M.D.
- Days of Our Lives
- Love of Life
- One Life to Live
- Falcon Crest
- Knots Landing
- Knots Landing: Back to the Cul-de-Sac
- Flamingo Road
- L.A.T.E.R: The Life And Times of Eddie Roberts

== Other ==
Marcus was elected to the board of directors of the WGAe seven times and served as Secretary/treasurer from 1992 to 1994. She published her memoir, Whistling Girl in 1999.

== Family ==
She and her husband, Ellis Marcus, also a television writer, had three children.

== Death ==
On December 3, 2014, Ann Marcus died in Sherman Oaks, California at the age of 93, from bladder cancer.

== Awards and nominations ==
Nominated for multiple Daytime Emmys and Primetime Emmys. Her first Daytime Emmy nomination was in 1978 for Outstanding Writing for a Drama Series. Marcus was also presented with the Morgan Cox Award for distinguished service to the WGA in 2000.

== Head writing tenure ==
Preceded by Gabrielle Upton	Head Writer of Search for Tomorrow; June 24, 1974 - November 21, 1975	Succeeded by Peggy O’Shea
Preceded by Pat Falken Smith	Head Writer of Days of Our Lives; April 20, 1977 - February 26, 1979	Succeeded by Elizabeth Harrower
Preceded by Jean Halloway	Head Writer of Love of Life; May 21, 1979 - February 1, 1980	Succeeded by series ended
Preceded by Pat Falken Smith; Norma Monty	Head Writer of General Hospital (with Norma Monty); January 12, 1987- April 1, 1988	Succeeded by H. Wesley Kenney (WGA strike)
Preceded by H. Wesley Kenney (WGA strike)	Head Writer of General Hospital (with Norma Monty); August 29, 1988 - December 9, 1988	Succeeded by Pat Falken Smith

== Sources ==
- Ann Marcus at IMDb
- The Caucus,
- New York Times obituary
