= Bill Kirchenbauer =

American actor and stand-up comedian (born 1953)

- Born: William Alfred Kirchenbauer; February 19, 1953 (age 73); Salzburg, Austria
- Occupations: Actor, comedian, comedy writer
- Years active: 1977–present
- Known for: Roles as Graham Lubbock on the ABC-TV series Growing Pains and its spinoff series Just the Ten of Us and "T.N.T." on Mork & Mindy
- Spouse: Lynn Robbins (m. 1987)
- Children: 1

William Alfred Kirchenbauer (/ˈkɜːrkɛnbaʊər/ KUR-ken-bow-ər; born February 19, 1953) is an American actor and stand-up comedian who has appeared in television shows and films since the late 1970s, most notably performing as a regular on Make Me Laugh and Fernwood 2 Night. As an actor, he is best known for his role as Coach Graham Lubbock on the series Growing Pains and starring in the spin-off series Just the Ten of Us.

== Life and career ==
Kirchenbauer was born in Salzburg, Austria, the son of Hester Elaine (née Andrews) and Alfred Ellsworth Kirchenbauer, who served in the U.S. Army. Kirchenbauer's documentary, Taking Al Back Home is a comedic story of a final road trip with his father, twenty five years after his death.

In 1978, Connie Stevens introduced Kirchenbauer for his stand-up appearance on Season 1, Episode 24 of The Comedy Shop hosted by Norm Crosby. Using items on stage in innovative ways, the mic stand became a giant rubber-tipped dart and he became chewing gum which ended up stuck on the bottom of the barstool.

Kirchenbauer has had recurring roles on Fernwood 2 Night and America 2-Night as singer Tony Rolletti; on Mork & Mindy as the geeky, obnoxious self-professed "ladies' man", womanizer Todd Norman "T.N.T." Taylor; and on Growing Pains as Coach Lubbock. He was a semi-regular panelist on the revival of Match Game in 1990 and Super Password.

Kirchenbauer has also appeared in movies such as Gorp, Stoogemania, The Story of Us, The Alternate, Unbeatable Harold and the 1984 Gallagher comedy special, Melon Crazy.
