= Frank De Vol =

American composer and arranger (1911–1999)

- Frank De Vol as Mr. Eaglewood in The Parent Trap (1961)
- Born: Frank Denny De Vol; September 20, 1911; Moundsville, West Virginia, U.S.
- Died: October 27, 1999 (aged 88); Lafayette, California, U.S.
- Other name: De Vol
- Occupations: Composer; arranger; bandleader; actor
- Spouses: Grayce Agnes McGinty (m. 1935; died 1989); Helen O'Connell (m. 1991; died 1993)
- Children: 2
- Musical career
- Also known as: De Vol
- Genres: Film score; mood music; jazz; pop; traditional pop; big band
- Years active: 1923–1999
- Formerly of: Alvino Rey Orchestra; Horace Heidt Orchestra

Frank Denny De Vol (September 20, 1911 – October 27, 1999), sometimes credited mononymously as De Vol, was an American composer, bandleader, arranger, and actor. As a film composer, he was nominated for five Academy Awards (four for Best Score and one for Best Original Song), among other accolades.

== Early life ==
De Vol was born in Moundsville in Marshall County in northern West Virginia, and was reared in Canton, Ohio. His father, Herman Frank De Vol, was band leader of the Grand Opera House in Canton, Ohio, and his mother, Minnie Emma Humphreys De Vol, had worked in a sewing shop. He attended Miami University.

De Vol began composing music when he was 12. When he was 14, he became a member of the Musicians' Union. After playing violin in his father's orchestra and appearances in a Chinese restaurant, he joined the Horace Heidt Orchestra in the 1930s, being responsible for the arrangements. Later, he toured with the Alvino Rey Orchestra, before embarking on his recording career.

== Career ==
=== Arrangements ===
By the time De Vol was 16, "he was doing arrangements with professional skill." From the 1940s, De Vol wrote arrangements for the studio recordings of many top singers, including Nat King Cole, Ella Fitzgerald, Sarah Vaughan, Tony Bennett, Dinah Shore, Doris Day, Vic Damone and Jaye P. Morgan. His single most famous arrangement is probably the haunting string and piano accompaniment to Cole's "Nature Boy", which was a United States Number One in 1948. That same year, he released a version of "The Teddy Bears' Picnic" (Capitol Records 15420), that he arranged and sang lead vocals on.

In 1966–1967, he arranged the soundtrack for the 1967 Columbia Pictures comedy film The Happening (starring Anthony Quinn) and co-produced The Supremes recording of the theme from the film (with Motown producers Holland–Dozier–Holland) which became a #1 American pop hit later that year.

=== Mood music ===
The success of "Nature Boy", recorded for Capitol Records, led to an executive position for De Vol at the rival Columbia Records. There, he recorded a series of orchestral mood music albums under the studio name "Music by De Vol" (which he also used for some of his film and TV work). The 1959 album Bacchanal! (The Passions and Pageantry of Gods and Goddesses of Mythology) is an acclaimed example of De Vol's mood music; each track is by English composer Albert Harris and is named after a god or goddess of Greek mythology. His 1962 album reached No. 102 in the US.

=== Concert appearances ===
In the 1950s, De Vol's orchestra played frequently at the Hollywood Palladium under the concert name "Music of the Century".

=== Radio ===
De Vol's orchestra and arrangements were available to radio stations via electrical transcriptions. His work was syndicated by Capitol Transcriptions, for which he also was musical director.

=== Hollywood ===
De Vol wrote the scores for many Hollywood movies, receiving Academy Award nominations for four of them: Pillow Talk (1959), Hush...Hush, Sweet Charlotte (1964), Cat Ballou (1965) and Guess Who's Coming to Dinner (1967).

De Vol's numerous scores included Kiss Me Deadly (1955), What Ever Happened to Baby Jane? (1962), McLintock! (1963), The Flight of the Phoenix (1965), The Glass Bottom Boat (1966), The Dirty Dozen (1967), Hustle (1975), Herbie Goes to Monte Carlo (1977) and Herbie Goes Bananas (1980). He also scored many Doris Day comedies and films for director Robert Aldrich.

De Vol also composed the jingle for the Screen Gems' "Dancing Sticks" logo (1963–1965), which appeared on all television series produced by the television division of Columbia Pictures.

=== Television work ===
De Vol was musical director (and occasionally seen) on Edgar Bergen's CBS Television prime-time game show Do You Trust Your Wife? (1956-1957). "Frank De Vol's orchestra" was featured on the NBC Television prime-time musical variety series The Lux Show Starring Rosemary Clooney (1957-1958). During this time, he appeared on The Betty White Show (1954) and Rod Cameron's syndicated State Trooper. In 1964 he was seen in an episode during the first season of, My Favorite Martian and several guest spots on different television shows throughout the 1960s. In the 1970s, he appeared as the ironically named dour bandleader Happy Kyne on the talk show satire/parody Fernwood 2 Night (1977) and America 2-Night (1978).

De Vol is best recognized for his television theme tunes, like Family Affair, The Brady Bunch and My Three Sons. The My Three Sons theme was musically complex, with a marimba playing a triplet obligato (the famous tune "Chopsticks") over the melody in 4/4 time, and was a hit single in 1961. He composed scores for episodes of McCloud and The Love Boat, amongst other work for television.

Beginning in 1969, "The Fuzz" became the theme song of Brazilian television newscast Jornal Nacional.

=== Acting ===
De Vol was also an actor specializing in deadpan comic characters; first appearing in various episodes of Life With Elizabeth, starring Betty White. He was perhaps best known as the dour bandleader Happy Kyne on the Norman Lear talk show parodies Fernwood 2 Night and America 2-Night, in 1977–78. He also had a recurring role in I'm Dickens, He's Fenster as Myron Bannister, Dickens & Fenster's boss; and appeared on The Cara Williams Show, I Dream of Jeannie, Gidget, Bonanza, Petticoat Junction (the 1967 episode, "That Was the Night That Was" and the 1969 episode, "The Organ Fund" as Reverend Barton), Mickey starring Mickey Rooney, The Brady Bunch, Get Smart (at least 2 appearances as Professor Carleton) and The Jeffersons. He had also comic roles as Chief Eaglewood, the head of the Thundercloud Boys' Camp in 1961's The Parent Trap, and as the onscreen narrator in Jerry Lewis's 1967 comedy film The Big Mouth.

De Vol appeared as a bandleader in the last season of My Three Sons, in addition to writing the theme music and serving as in-house composer for most of the show's twelve seasons. He also scored most episodes of Family Affair, including many of the same incidental music cues as My Three Sons.

In 1980, he appeared in the second season of Diff'rent Strokes, in episode 22, "The Slumber Party".

De Vol preferred to be credited as "Frank De Vol" for his acting appearances, and as "De Vol" for his musical work.

== Personal life ==
De Vol was initiated as an honorary member of the Gamma Omega chapter of Phi Mu Alpha Sinfonia, the national fraternity for men in music, in 1962.

In the mid-1990s, well into his eighties, De Vol was active in the Big Band Academy of America.

He was married twice, first to Grayce Agnes McGinty in 1935. The 54-year marriage produced two daughters, Linda Morehouse and Donna Copeland, and ended with Grayce's death in 1989. His second marriage was to television actress and big band singer Helen O'Connell from 1991 until her death in 1993.

=== Death ===
De Vol died of congestive heart failure on October 27, 1999, in Lafayette, California. He is interred at the Forest Lawn Memorial Park Cemetery in Hollywood Hills.

== Filmography ==
=== Composer ===
- World for Ransom (1954)
- Kiss Me Deadly (1955)
- The Big Knife (1955)
- Attack (1956)
- The Ride Back (1957)
- Johnny Trouble (1957)
- Pillow Talk (1959)
- Murder, Inc. (1960)
- ’’The Old Sweet Songs of Christmas’’ (1960)
- Lover Come Back (1961)
- Boys' Night Out (1962)
- What Ever Happened to Baby Jane? (1962)
- The Thrill of It All (1963)
- For Love or Money (1963)
- Under the Yum Yum Tree (1963)
- McLintock! (1963)
- The Wheeler Dealers (1963)
- Good Neighbor Sam (1964)
- Send Me No Flowers (1964)
- Hush...Hush, Sweet Charlotte (1964)
- Cat Ballou (1965)
- The Flight of the Phoenix (1965)
- The Glass Bottom Boat (1966)
- Family Affair (1966)
- The Ballad of Josie (1967)
- The Happening (1967)
- Caprice (1967)
- Guess Who's Coming to Dinner (1967)
- The Dirty Dozen (1967)
- What's So Bad About Feeling Good? (1968)
- The Legend of Lylah Clare (1968)
- The Brady Bunch (1969)
- Krakatoa, East of Java (1969)
- Ulzana's Raid (1972)
- Emperor of the North Pole (1973)
- The Longest Yard (1974)
- Doc Savage: The Man of Bronze (1975)
- Hustle (1975)
- Herbie Goes to Monte Carlo (1977)
- The Choirboys (1977)
- The Frisco Kid (1979)
- Herbie Goes Bananas (1980)
- ...All the Marbles (1981)

=== Actor ===
- The Parent Trap (1961) - Mr. Eaglewood
- Boys' Night Out (1962) - One of the guys in the hallway (uncredited)
- A Very Special Favor (1965) - Desk Clerk
- The Big Mouth (1967) - Bogart
- Adam-12 (1972) - Professor Mark
- W.C. Fields and Me (1976) - Undertaker (uncredited)
- The Frisco Kid (1979) - Piano Player - Old Timer

== Academy Award nominations ==
- Pillow Talk (1959)
- Hush...Hush, Sweet Charlotte (1964)
- Cat Ballou (1965)
- Guess Who's Coming to Dinner (1967)
