= Normal (Martin Mull album) =

Studio album by Martin Mull
- Released: 1974
- Genre: Comedy
- Label: Capricorn

Martin Mull chronology
Martin Mull and His Fabulous Furniture in Your Living Room! (1973)	Normal (1974)	In the Soop with Martin Mull (1974)

Normal is an album by the American actor and musician Martin Mull, released in 1974. He supported it with a North American tour.

== Production ==
Mull was influenced in part by the many hotel and motel lounge singers whom he saw while touring; his initial guitar influences included rockabilly, R&B, and Steve Cropper. He used 43 musicians during the recording sessions, including Pepper Adams and Chuck Leavell. "Jim 'n I" is about a separated Siamese twin who misses his brother. The title track is a narrative about a hippie who decides to become a typical Heartland American. "The Blacks Are Giving Me the Blues" pokes fun at white vocalists who attempt to imitate Black singers. "Wood Shop" is about a man whose talents peaked in high school.

== Critical reception ==
Professional ratings
Review scores
Source	Rating
AllMusic	1.5/5 stars
Robert Christgau	D+
The New Rolling Stone Record Guide	1/5 stars

The New York Times called the songs "loony tunes", and noted that Mull was not a satirist but rather someone who "is not only poking fun at what already is laughable but spoon-feeding a self-satisfied audience spoiled enough to enjoy being spoon-fed." The Philadelphia Daily News said that "the songs are hilarious, even though Mull ... is not as funny recorded as he is live." The Houston Post stated that the album contains "mildly sardonic lyrics and MOR musical backgrounds."

The Richmond Times-Dispatch compared Mull to Will Rogers and Mark Twain, stating that Mull had the same way of getting "a message across in a kindly way, accompanied by a sleepy smile"; the paper also admired his "flat, Midwestern drawl [that fits] perfectly his rambling sagas of boredom, frustration and flatulence... Everything about Martin Mull bespeaks a carefully crafted mediocrity." The Chicago Tribune called him "a sort of colossal combination of the off-beat dark visions of Randy Newman and the insanity of Jonathan Winters". The Record opined that Normal reflects "a vision of life as Americans live it but often don't realize it."

AllMusic concluded that many of the songs "feel like cheap shots at easy targets." Robert Christgau dismissed the album as "not funny".

== Track listing ==
Side I

1. "Normal"
2. "Wood Shop"
3. "Dialing for Dollars"
4. "Woodstock Samba"
5. "Rome and Bored"
6. "Flexible"
7. "Jim 'n I"

Side II

1. "Drunkard's Waltz"
2. "The Blacks Are Giving Me the Blues"
3. "Birthday"
4. "Jesus Christ Football Star"
5. "Ego Boogie"
6. "You Play Rhythm"
