= Martin Mull =

American actor (1943–2024)

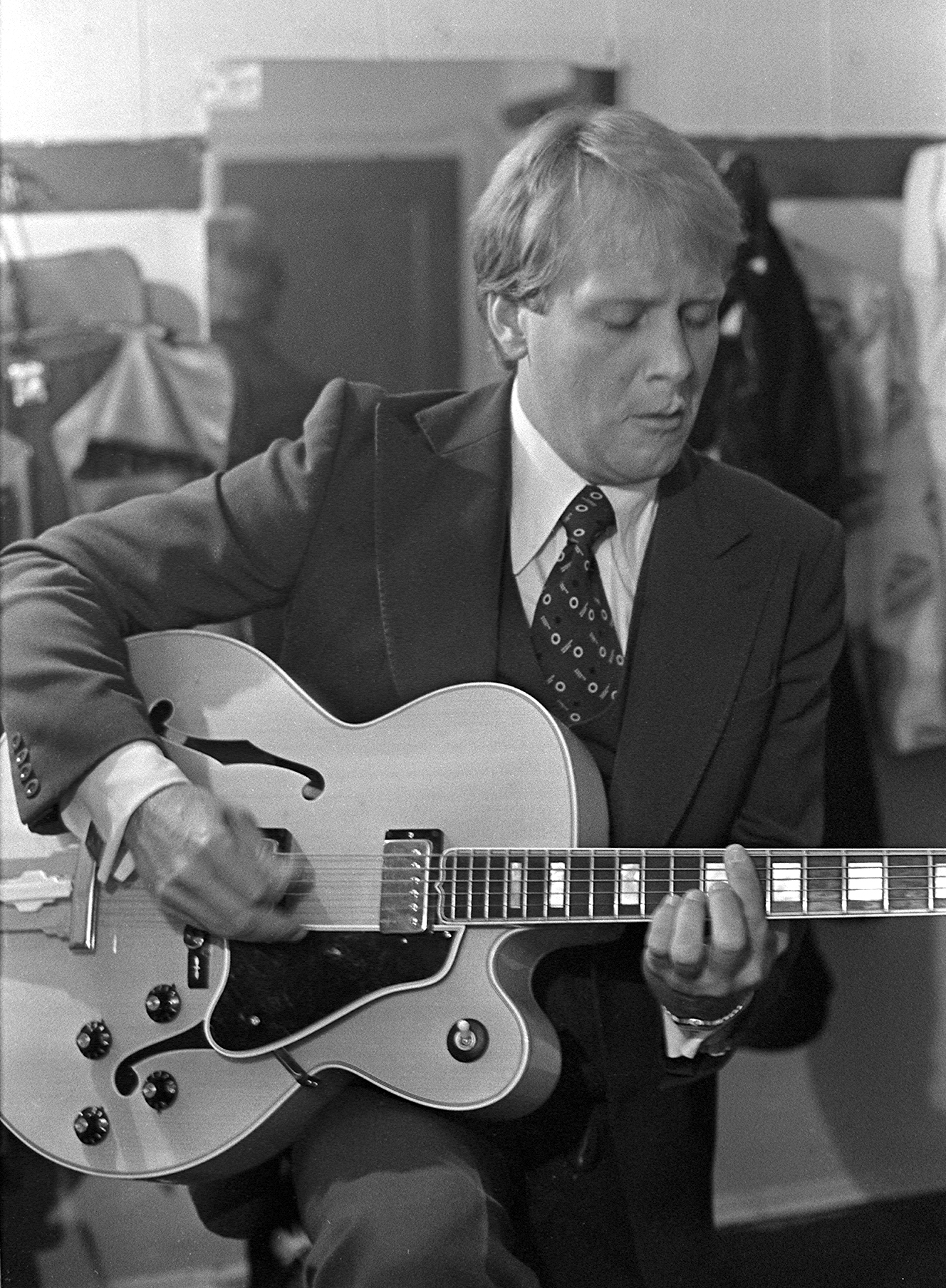
- Mull playing guitar backstage at The Boarding House in San Francisco, May 1976
- Born: Martin Eugene Mull; August 18, 1943; Chicago, Illinois, U.S.
- Died: June 27, 2024 (aged 80); Los Angeles, California, U.S.
- Education: New Canaan High School, Rhode Island School of Design, (BFA, MFA)
- Occupations: Painter, Actor
- Years active: 1970–2024
- Spouses: Kristin Johnson (m. 1972; div. 1978); Sandra Baker (m. 1978; div. 1981); Wendy Haas (m. 1982)
- Children: 1

Martin Eugene Mull (/ˈmʊl/, August 18, 1943 – June 27, 2024) was an American painter, actor, and comedian. Mull gained early notoriety on Mary Hartman, Mary Hartman, and the parody talk-show spin-offs Fernwood 2 Night and America 2 Night. Other notable roles included Colonel Mustard in the 1985 film Clue, Leon Carp on Roseanne, Willard Kraft on Sabrina the Teenage Witch, Vlad Masters/Vlad Plasmius on Danny Phantom, Gene Parmesan on Arrested Development, and his recurring role as drug-addled pharmacist Russell on Two and a Half Men. The retrospective documentary Who is Martin Mull? was released in 2026.

== Early life and education ==
Mull was born in Chicago, the son of Betty Mull, an actress and director, and Harold Mull (1918–2001), an acoustics engineer. He moved with his family to North Ridgeville, Ohio west of downtown Cleveland, when he was two years old. They lived there until he was 15 years old when he and his family moved to New Canaan, Connecticut. After graduating from New Canaan High School in the city, Martin Mull studied painting and graduated in 1965 from the Rhode Island School of Design in Providence, Rhode Island with a Bachelor of Fine Arts; in 1967, he earned a Master of Fine Arts in painting, also from RISD.

== Career ==
=== Music ===
Mull broke into show business as a songwriter, penning Jane Morgan's 1970 country single, "A Girl Named Johnny Cash", which peaked at No. 61 on Billboard's country charts. Shortly thereafter, he began his own recording career.

Mull being asked about The Cool Kids, a Fox sitcom, September 2018

Throughout the 1970s, and especially in the first half of the decade, Mull was best known as a musical comedian, performing satirical and humorous songs both live and in studio recordings. Rather than use the stage trappings of most musical acts, Mull decorated his stage with comfortable thrift store furniture. Notable live gigs included opening for Randy Newman and Sandy Denny at Boston Symphony Hall in 1973, Frank Zappa at Austin's Armadillo World Headquarters in 1973, Billy Joel in Wilkes-Barre, Pennsylvania in 1974; and for Bruce Springsteen at the Shady Grove Music Fair in Gaithersburg, Maryland in October 1974. His self-titled debut album, was released by Capricorn in 1972, featured noteworthy musicians including Ramblin' Jack Elliott, Levon Helm from The Band, Keith Spring of NRBQ, Jack Bone, and Libby Titus.

Elvis Costello and Gary Sperrazza attribute the remark "Writing about music is like dancing about architecture" to Martin Mull.

=== Acting ===
Mull's first well-known acting role was as Garth Gimble in the 1976 television nighttime absurdist soap opera Mary Hartman, Mary Hartman. That led to work in the spin-off talk show parodies Fernwood 2 Night (1977) and America 2 Night (1978), in which he played talk show host Barth Gimble (Garth's twin brother), opposite Fred Willard, as sidekick and announcer Jerry Hubbard. Mull appeared as the neurotic, libidinous disc jockey Eric Swan in the 1978 movie FM, his feature film debut. In 1979, Mull appeared in the Taxi episode "Hollywood Calling". He created, wrote, and starred in the short-lived 1984 CBS sitcom Domestic Life, with Megan Follows playing his teenaged daughter.

During the 1980s, Mull played supporting roles in the films Mr. Mom (1983) and Clue (1985), and had a rare lead role in Serial (1980). In 1985, he co-created and starred in The History of White People in America—the Associated Press said the mockumentary was "what many thought was his best work". He also starred in a series of commercials for Michelob and Pizza Hut, and in a series of television and radio commercials for Red Roof Inn with Willard. He appeared in the 1986 Pecos Bill episode of the Shelley Duvall TV series Tall Tales & Legends. In a 1990 episode of The Golden Girls, he played a hippie who was afraid of the outside world.

Mull had a long-running role from 1991 to 1997 as Leon Carp, Roseanne Conner's gay boss (and later business partner) on the TV series Roseanne. He had roles in several 1990s films including Mrs. Doubtfire (1993) and Jingle All the Way (1996). From 1997 to 2000, he played Willard Kraft on the show Sabrina the Teenage Witch; he was Sabrina Spellman's high school's vice-principal in seasons 2 and 3 and her high school's principal in season 4. Mull appeared as a guest star on the game show Hollywood Squares, appearing as the center square in the show's final season, from 2003 to 2004. He did the voice of Vlad Masters/Vlad Plasmius, the main villain in Danny Phantom from 2004 to 2007.

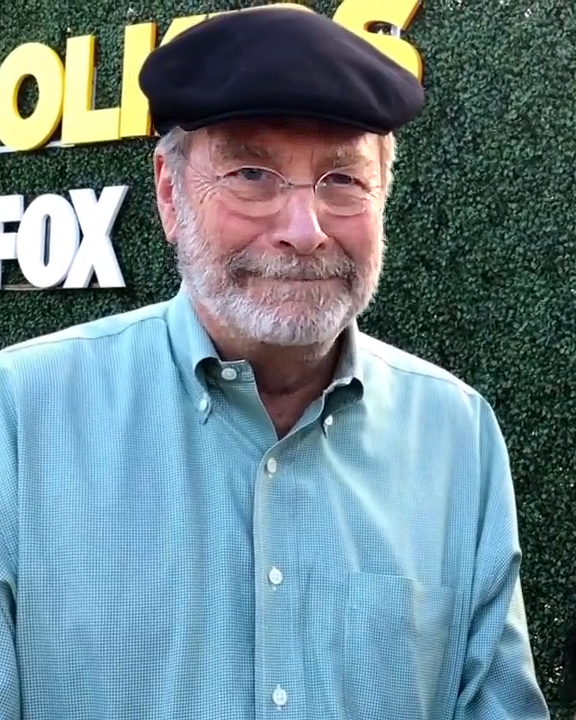
Mull in 2018

In late 2004 and in 2013's Netflix-produced fourth season of Arrested Development, Mull portrayed Gene Parmesan, a private investigator. From 2008 to 2013, he had a recurring role on the show Two and a Half Men as Russell, a humorous drug-using and drug-selling pharmacist. During 2008 and 2009, Mull guest starred in two episodes of the television series Gary Unmarried, as Allison's father. He appeared as Holbrook in the 2010 action comedy film Killers.

In 2015, he appeared in two episodes of the TV series Community as George Perry, the father of Britta Perry. He also starred in the Fox television sitcom Dads (2013–14), I'm Sorry (2017–18), and The Cool Kids (2018–19), the latter with David Alan Grier, Vicki Lawrence, and Leslie Jordan. In 2016, Mull appeared as guest star in the satirical TV series Veep, a role that earned him an Emmy nomination. His later credits include The Ranch, Brooklyn Nine-Nine, and Bob's Burgers.

=== Art ===
Mull began painting in the 1970s, and his work has appeared in group and solo exhibits. He participated in the June 15, 1971 exhibit "Flush with the Walls" in the men's room of the Boston Museum of Fine Arts to protest the lack of contemporary and local art in the museum. His first serious one-person exhibition was held in 1980 at the Molly Barnes Gallery in Los Angeles and was credited by artist Mark Kostabi as instrumental in launching his own career because of "Mull's simultaneous embrace of humor and gravitas in visual art." His work often combined photorealist painting, and the pop art and collage styles. He published a book of some of his paintings, titled Paintings Drawings and Words, in 1995. One of his paintings was used on the cover for the 2008 Joyce Carol Oates novel My Sister, My Love. Another painting of his titled After Dinner Drinks (2008), which is owned by Steve Martin, was used for the cover of Love Has Come for You, an album by Martin and Edie Brickell.

== Personal life and death ==
Mull was divorced twice and was married for forty-two years to singer Wendy Haas until his death. Mull and Haas had a daughter, Maggie, who as of 2021 is a co-executive producer for Family Guy. In a 2010 interview on The Green Room with Paul Provenza, Mull said that he was agnostic.

On June 27, 2024, Mull died at his home in Los Angeles from a long, undisclosed illness at the age of 80. His body was donated to medical science through the UCLA Donated Body Program.

== Filmography ==
=== Film ===
Year	Film	Role	Notes
1978	FM	Eric Swan	
1980	Serial	Harvey Holroyd	
1980	My Bodyguard	Mr. Peache	
1981	Take This Job and Shove It	Dick Ebersol	
1982	Flicks	Tang/Arthur Lyle	
1983	Mr. Mom	Ron Richardson	
1983	Private School	Pharmacy Guy	Uncredited
1984	Bad Manners	Warren Fitzpatrick	
1985	Clue	Colonel Mustard	
1985	O.C. and Stiggs	Pat Coletti	
1986	The Boss' Wife	Tony Dugdale	
1987	Home Is Where the Hart Is	Carson Boundy	
1988	Rented Lips	Archie Powell	Also writer and producer
1989	Cutting Class	William Carson III	
1990	Ski Patrol	Sam Marris	
1990	Think Big	Dr. Hayden Bruekner	
1990	Far Out Man	Dr. Leddledick	
1992	Miracle Beach	Donald Burbank	
1992	Dance with Death	Art	
1993	Mrs. Doubtfire	Justin Gregory	
1994	Mr. Write	Dan Barnes	
1996	Edie & Pen	Johnnie Sparkle	
1996	Jingle All the Way	D.J.	
1998	Zack and Reba	Virgil Payne	
1998	Richie Rich's Christmas Wish	Richard Rich Sr.	Direct-to-video
2000	Attention Shoppers	Charles	
2002	The Year That Trembled	Wayne Simonelli	
2006	Relative Strangers	Jeffry Morton	
2010	Killers	Holbrook	
2013	Tim's Vermeer	Himself	Documentary
2018	A Futile and Stupid Gesture	Modern Doug Kenney	
2026	Who is Martin Mull?	Himself	Documentary; posthumous

=== Television ===
Year	Film	Role	Notes
1976–1977	Mary Hartman, Mary Hartman	Garth Gimble / Barth Gimble	49 episodes
1977	Fernwood 2 Night	Barth Gimble	65 episodes
1977	The New Adventures of Wonder Woman	Hamlin Rule/Pied Piper	Episode: "The Pied Piper"
1978	America 2-Night	Barth Gimble	65 episodes
1979	Taxi	Roger Chapman	Episode: "Hollywood Calling"
1983	Sunset Limousine	Mel Shaver	Television film
1983	Square Pegs	Dan Vermillion	Episode: It's Academical
1984	Domestic Life	Martin Crane	10 episodes
1985	The History of White People in America	Himself	Mockumentary; also writer and executive producer
1985	Lots of Luck	Frank Maris	Television film
1985	California Girls	Elliot	Television film
1987	Martin Mull Live from North Ridgeville, Ohio	Self	Standup Set and Biography
1988	Portrait of a White Marriage	Martin Mull	Television film; also writer and executive producer
1990	His & Hers	Doug Lambert	13 episodes
1990	The Golden Girls	Jimmy	Episode: "Snap Out of It"
1991	Get a Life	Sandy Connors	Episode: "Chris Wins a Celebrity"
1991–1997	Roseanne	Leon Carp	46 episodes; also creative consultant (season 4) and wrote episode "Tolerate Thy Neighbor"
1992–1993	The Larry Sanders Show	Himself	2 episodes
1993	The Day My Parents Ran Away	Norman Roberts	Television film
1993	Family Dog	Skip Binsford	Voice, 10 episodes
1994	Burke's Law	Wayne Hudson	Episode: "Who Killed Good Time Charlie?"
1994	How the West Was Fun	Bart Gifooley	Television film
1995	Lois & Clark: The New Adventures of Superman	Marlin Pfinch-Lupus	Episode: "Whine, Whine, Whine"
1997	Beverly Hills Family Robinson	Doug Robinson	Television film
1997	Over the Top	Brookes Jenson	Episode: "The Review"
1997–2000	Sabrina the Teenage Witch	Willard Kraft	39 episodes
1998	The Simpsons	Seth	Voice, episode: "D'oh-in' in the Wind"
1998–2000	Recess	Paul Prickly	2 episodes
1998–2004	Hollywood Squares	Himself	
2000	Family Guy	Mr. Harris	Voice, episode: "If I'm Dyin', I'm Lyin'"
2000	Just Shoot Me!	Stan	Episode: "Slamming Jack"
2000	The Wild Thornberrys	Dennis Tucker	Voice, episode: "Birthday Quake"
2001	Dexter's Laboratory	M.A.R. 10	Voice, episode: "Lab on the Run"
2001	Sister Mary Explains It All	Skeptical Husband	Television film
2001–2002	The Ellen Show	Ed Munn	18 episodes
2002	Teamo Supremo	Governor Kevin	Voice, 10 episodes
2003	Reba	Dr. Todd	Episode: "Encounters"
2004	Half & Half	Bob Tyrell	Episode: "The Big Rules of Engagement Episode"
2004	Reno 911!	Jim Kringle	Episode: "Department Investigation: Part 2"
2004	A Boyfriend for Christmas	Martin Grant	Television film
2004–2007	Danny Phantom	Vlad Masters/Vlad Plasmius	Voice, 16 episodes
2004, 2013; 2018–2019	Arrested Development	Gene Parmesan	6 episodes
2005	Hopeless Pictures	Skip	Voice
2005–2011	American Dad!	Father Donovan	Voice, 10 episodes
2006	Crumbs	Tom	Episode: "Six Feet Blunder"
2007	The War at Home	Principal Fink	3 episodes
2008	Law & Order: Special Victims Unit	Dr. Gideon Hutton	Episode: "Retro"
2008–2009	Gary Unmarried	Charlie	2 episodes
2008–2009	My Boys	Dr. Clayton	2 episodes
2008–2013	Two and a Half Men	Russell The Pharmacist	6 episodes
2009	Eastwick	Milton Philmont	Episode: "Reaping and Sewing"
2010	'Til Death	Whitey	12 episodes
2011	Oliver's Ghost	Clive Rutledge	Television film
2011	Mad Love	Kurt Grabowski	Episode: "After the Fireworks"
2012	El Jefe	Richard Turkus	Unaired pilot
2013	Psych	Highway Harry	Episode: "100 Clues"
2013	Reading Writing & Romance	Phil	Television film
2013–2014	Dads	Crawford Whittemore	Main role; 19 episodes
2015	Community	George Perry	2 episodes
2015–2017	Life in Pieces	Gary Timpkins	4 episodes
2016	Hail Mary	Mr. Wolf	Unaired pilot
2016	Veep	Bob Bradley	4 episodes Nominated – Primetime Emmy Award for Outstanding Guest Actor in a Comedy Series
2016–2020	The Ranch	Jerry	13 episodes
2017	NCIS: Los Angeles	Eddie (Edward O'Boyle)	Episode: "Old Tricks"
2017–2019	I'm Sorry	Martin	7 episodes
2018–2019	The Cool Kids	Charlie	22 episodes
2020	Brooklyn Nine-Nine	Admiral Walter Peralta	Episode: "Admiral Peralta"
2020	Bless This Mess	Martin	Episode: "The Table"
2020	Bob's Burgers	Shopkeeper	Voice, episode: "Local She-ro"
2022	Grace and Frankie	H.W. Wallingford	Episode: "The Last Hurrah"
2022	Maggie	Zach	Episode: "The Fortune You Seek is in Another Cookie"
2023	Not Dead Yet	Monty	3 episodes
2023	The Afterparty	Sheriff Reardon	2 episodes

=== Video game ===
Year	Title	Voice role	Notes
2005	Nicktoons Unite!	Vlad Plasmius	

== Discography ==
- Martin Mull (1972)
- "Dueling Tubas" (single) charted at #92 on Billboard's Hot 100 (1973); #87 in Canada; #70 in Canada AC
- Martin Mull and His Fabulous Furniture in Your Living Room! (1973)
- Normal (1974)
- In the Soop with Martin Mull (with Ed Wise and Les Daniels, recorded in 1967, released in 1974)
- Days of Wine and Neuroses (1975)
- I'm Everyone I've Ever Loved (1977)
- No Hits, Four Errors – The Best of Martin Mull (1977)
- Sex & Violins (1978)
- Near Perfect/Perfect (1979)
- Mulling It Over – A Musical Ouvre-View of Martin Mull (1998)
