= The Happening (1967 soundtrack) =

Soundtrack album by Frank De Vol
- Released: June 1, 1967
- Genre: Pop
- Length: 24:51
- Labels: Colgems Records; RCA Records
- Producer: Frank De Vol

Singles from The Happening
- 1. "The Happening" Released: March 20, 1967

The Happening is the soundtrack for the 1967 comedy film The Happening, released by Columbia Pictures. The soundtrack and film score were produced by Frank De Vol.

The title song "The Happening" and "All I Know About You" were co-written by De Vol in conjunction with Motown composers Brian Holland, Lamont Dozier and Eddie Holland. Released concurrently with the film, "The Happening" reached #1 on the Billboard Pop Singles Chart in May of that year, becoming The Supremes' tenth American chart-topper. The single was not included in this soundtrack LP, due to contractual licensing restrictions, but in The Supremes' greatest hits compilations. Its flip side "All I Know About You" was finally included in 1989 as a bonus track in the CD re-issue of the trio's 1968 album "Reflections".

The song "The Fuzz" has had a rather unlikely extended life, becoming the theme music for the Brazilian television news program Jornal Nacional in 1969. Although it no longer uses the exact song today, Jornal Nacional continues to use "The Fuzz" as a signature for its current theme.

Aside from Jornal Nacional, Mexican newscast 24 Horas also uses the song as the theme music for the newscast from its start in 1970 until 1979.

Similarly to "The Fuzz", "Let's Play Games" also had an unlikely extended life. It was adapted and used as the theme music of long-running Hong Kong radio drama Eighteenth Floor Block C. "Let's Play Games" is still the basis of the theme song today, though multiple modifications were made throughout the program's life.

== Track listing ==
All tracks composed by Frank De Vol; engineer: John Norman

Side A

1. "Let's Play Games" (De Vol) – 2:13
2. "Early in the Morning", sung by Stephen Doyle Smith (De Vol, lyrics by William Roy) – 2:29
3. "Escapism" (De Vol) – 1:48
4. "The Airport Caper" (De Vol) – 1:53
5. "Early in the Morning" (Instrumental) (De Vol) – 2:06
6. "The Fuzz" (De Vol) – 2:30

Side B

1. "All I Know About You" (Instrumental) (De Vol, lyrics by Holland-Dozier-Holland) – 1:53
2. "The Happening" (Instrumental) (De Vol, lyrics by Holland-Dozier-Holland) – 2:00
3. "Fred Splits" (De Vol) – 1:46
4. "Let's Play More Games" (De Vol) – 1:52
5. "Turndown" (De Vol) – 2:20
6. "More Airport Caper" (De Vol) – 2:01
