= Blood Rage =

1987 American slasher film by John Grissmer

- Theateical release poster
- Directed by: John Grissmer
- Written by: Bruce Rubin
- Produced by: Marianne Kanter
- Starring: Louise Lasser: Mark Soper; Julie Gordon; Jayne Bentzen
- Cinematography: Richard E. Brooks
- Edited by: Christine P. Williams
- Music by: Richard Einhorn
- Distributed by: Film Limited
- Release date: March 29, 1987
- Running time: 82 minutes
- Country: United States
- Language: English

Blood Rage (also known as Nightmare at Shadow Woods and Slasher) is a 1987 American slasher film directed by John Grissmer, written by Bruce Rubin, and starring Louise Lasser, Mark Soper, and Julie Gordon. Set on Thanksgiving, the film follows a woman and her adult son who are stalked at their remote apartment community by the son's unhinged twin brother who has escaped from a psychiatric institution after allegedly murdering a man years earlier.

The film features additional performances from producer Kanter, Jayne Bentzen, as well as a cameo appearance by Ted Raimi. Filmed in 1983 in Jacksonville, Florida, it was released theatrically under the title Nightmare at Shadow Woods in 1987 in a censored cut which eliminated much of the film's elaborate gore special effects. It was subsequently released on home video under the title Blood Rage, though the opening credits identify the film's title as Slasher. The film received a Blu-ray and DVD release by Arrow Films in December 2015, featuring the three varying versions of the film.

== Plot ==
Todd and Terry are identical twin brothers. One night at a drive-in theater in 1974, young Terry sees his mother Maddy and her date begin kissing inside the car. He wakes his brother and they sneak out of the car. Apparently triggered by his mother's promiscuity, Terry takes a hatchet and murders a teenager having sex with his girlfriend in the backseat of their car. He then frames Todd by smearing blood onto him and placing the hatchet into his hand. Todd, too traumatized to speak in his own defense, is committed to an asylum while Terry remains free.

Ten years later, in 1984, a now-adult Terry lives happily with his mother in a sprawling but secluded apartment complex named Shadow Woods. On Thanksgiving Day, Terry's long dormant murderous rage is revived when his mother gets engaged to her fiancé Brad, who owns the complex. Terry also learns that Todd has escaped from his mental hospital and may be heading home. Dr. Berman and her assistant Jackie from the hospital arrive at Shadow Woods to search for Todd.

Terry murders Brad by chopping off his right hand and splitting his head open with a machete. He then impales Jackie (while implying he is intending to once again frame Todd), and soon after cuts Dr. Berman in half in the woods. He discards his bloody shirt after showering. He then visits his new neighbor Andrea, who is babysitting for their other neighbor Julie in the latter's apartment. Andrea attempts to seduce Terry but he seems uninterested, at which point Julie and her date Bill arrive home. Meanwhile, Terry's girlfriend Karen bumps into Todd, who has arrived at Shadow Woods, and she believes he is Terry. When Todd reveals his true identity, she flees to tell her friends Gregg and Artie. After she also tells Terry, he heads off alone in search of his twin brother, while Karen, Andrea, Gregg and Artie go to Andrea's house to party.

Upon learning from Terry that Todd has returned to Shadow Woods, Maddy begins to panic and drink heavily while cleaning the apartment and trying (but failing) to reach Brad on the phone. Todd comes across Dr. Berman's body and becomes emotional. He takes Dr. Berman's gun and goes off in search of his twin brother. Back at Julie's apartment, Terry first decapitates Bill and then stabs Julie to death. Meanwhile, Todd goes to Maddy's apartment and tucks his passed-out mother into bed. Terry spies on Gregg and Andrea playing tennis, before murdering both of them while they're having sex by the swimming pool. Artie is held at gunpoint by Todd, who tries to convince him that his brother is the real killer. Todd flees when Terry sees him, causing Artie and Terry to give chase. When Artie discovers Terry's assortment of weapons, Terry stabs him in the neck with a carving fork.

Terry reveals his true nature to Karen and starts chasing her around the apartment complex. After seeing Jackie's and Artie's bodies, Karen flees to Julie's house and discovers her dead body. She escapes from Terry and takes Julie's baby with her. Maddy finds Terry's bloodied T-shirt in the garbage bin before making the horrifying discovery of Brad's body, taking Brad's gun with her. Terry chases Karen to the swimming pool, where she finds Andrea's and Gregg's bodies. Todd arrives and fights his brother inside the pool. As Todd is pulled out of the pool by Karen, Maddy appears and shoots Terry, killing him. Maddy consoles Todd in the belief he is Terry and she has killed Todd. Upon realizing that she has actually killed Terry and not Todd, she becomes hysterical and shoots herself in the head while Karen flees with the baby. Police sirens are heard in the distance, leaving Todd's fate ambiguous.

== Cast ==
- Louise Lasser as Maddy Simmons
- Mark Soper as Todd & Terry Simmons
- Marianne Kanter as Dr. Berman
- Julie Gordon as Karen Reed
- Jayne Bentzen as Julie
- Bill Cakmis as Maddy's Date
- James Farrell as Artie
- Ed French as Bill
- Gerry Lou as Beth
- Chad Montgomery as Gregg Ramsey
- Lisa Randall as Andrea
- Doug Weiser as Jackie
- Dana Drescher as Little Girl
- Brad Leland as Drive-In Boy
- Rebecca Thorp as Drive-In Girl
- Ted Raimi as Condom Salesman

== Production ==
=== Filming ===
Filming of Blood Rage took place in 1983 in Jacksonville, Florida, where producer Marianne Kanter had secured a large number of local film investors. Scenes on the nature trails were shot on the campus of the University of North Florida, while the apartment complex was located in west Jacksonville. Additional filming for the opening drive-in sequence took place in New Jersey.

According to Kanter, the only reason she appeared in the role of Dr. Berman had been because the actress hired to do the role from New York failed to show up. Kanter also noted that the production of the film was rocky, with star Louise Lasser and director John Grissmer not getting along on set. According to Kanter, Grissmer quit during the middle of the shoot, though she was able to get him to agree to return. The film's working title was Complex, though it was re-titled Slasher by Grissmer.

== Release ==
Although the film was shot in 1983, it was given only a limited theatrical release in the United States by the Film Concept Group under the title Nightmare at Shadow Woods in 1987; this cut of the film truncated a considerable amount of the gore special effects. The film was re-released theatrically, completely uncut, in 2025 at Regal Edward’s Cinema Mira Mesa (California) thanks to “Popcorn Reef”

=== Alternative versions ===
Nightmare at Shadow Woods (which was also the cable television title for this film) was heavily edited, abbreviating much of the gore, but it contained a swimming pool scene not found in the 1987 VHS Blood Rage version by Prism Entertainment. The latter contains all of the gore and includes an early scene, missing from the Nightmare at Shadow Woods version, where Maddy visits Todd at the mental hospital.

=== Home media ===
The film was released on VHS by Prism Entertainment in 1987 under the title Blood Rage. The Nightmare at Shadow Woods cut of the film had a budget DVD release in 2004 by Legacy Entertainment.

Arrow Films released the film on Blu-ray in a 3-disc limited edition Blu-ray and DVD combination set in December 2015, which contained an additional Blu-ray disc featuring the Nightmare at Shadow Woods cut of the film as well as outtakes and a composite cut. A standard two-disc Blu-ray and DVD combination set was released in January 2017.

== Reception ==
Clayton Dillard of Slant Magazine awarded the film four-and-a-half out of five stars, writing: "Funny, brutal, and featuring an above-average amount of T&A, Blood Rage epitomizes the slasher film's sense of transgression, both in terms of bodily awareness and genre play". The Variety Film Reviews guide deemed the film a "trite slasher flick", adding: "Only Lasser, experienced enough to realize the anemic script can only be played for laughs, has any screen presence". Nate Guerra, of the website Bloody Disgusting, felt Mark Soper's performance "can be awkward at times, but Soper does do a great job separating the twin's personalities and portraying two completely different characters". He continued: "He has weird moments, such as putting lots of unnecessary emphasis on lines... His performance is truly based on whether or not he's trying at any given moment. But Soper looks like he's having a great time, and that's what counts for a movie such as this".

The horror movie podcast Watch If You Dare reviews Blood Rage for their annual Thanksgiving episode every year. Their 2021 episode was named after its alternative title Slasher in an effort to trick listeners as a joke.
