= Writing about music is like dancing about architecture =

Maxim about music criticism

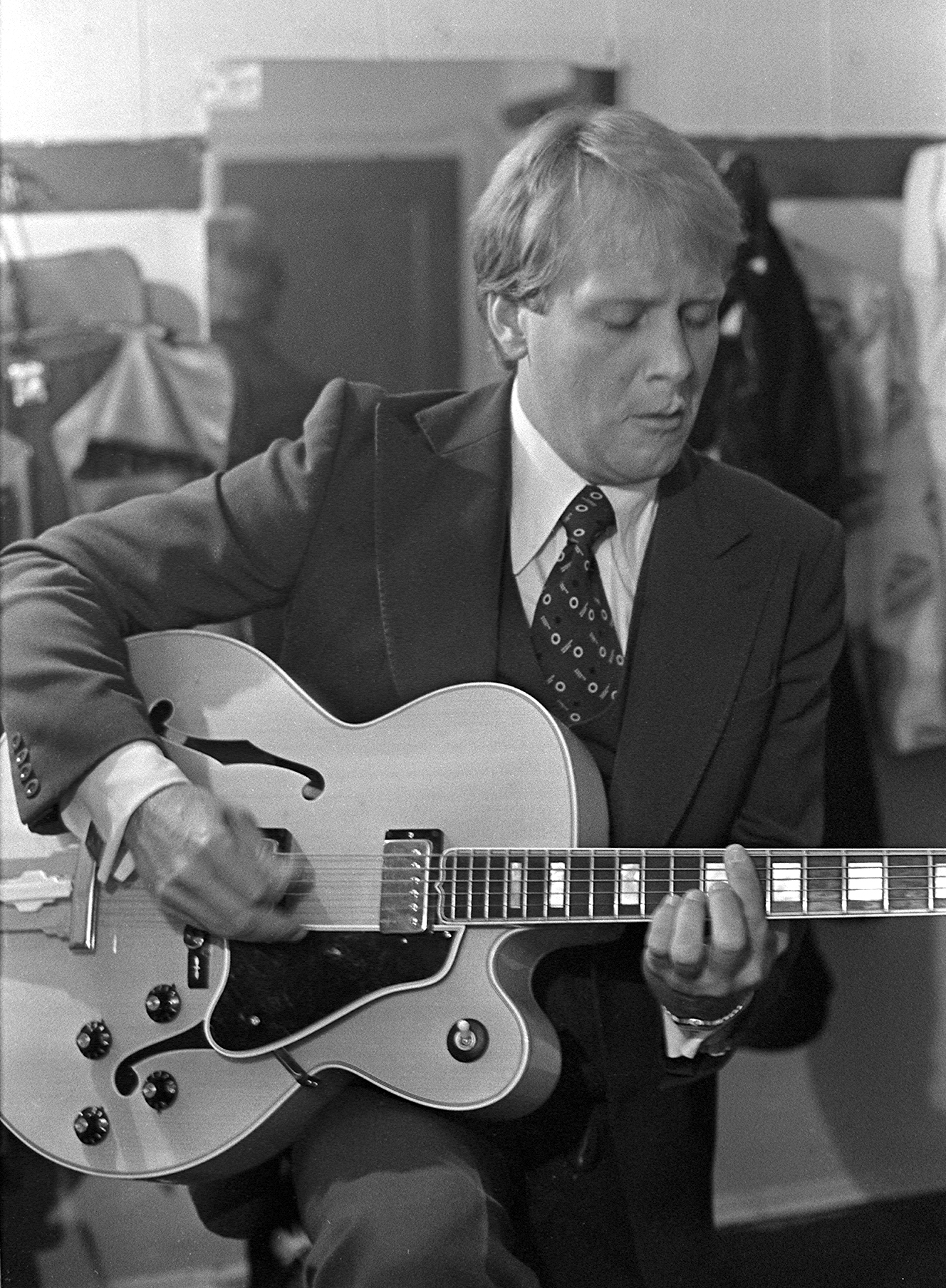
Musical comedian Martin Mull (pictured in 1976) is thought to have originated the quote, although an earlier variation of the line from the early 20th-century has been documented.

"Writing about music is like dancing about architecture" is a maxim used to express the futility of translating music through words. It may be employed as an argument for dismissing music criticism altogether.

The quote's origin is unknown. It is most commonly misattributed to musicians Laurie Anderson and Elvis Costello. Others, including Costello himself, credit the remark to comedian Martin Mull, although a variation ("talking about music is like singing about economics") has appeared in print since as early as 1918.

== Origins ==
The origins of the quote have never been verified. It has been attributed to musicians, entertainers, and writers such as William S. Burroughs, Miles Davis, Thelonious Monk, Charles Mingus, Frank Zappa, George Carlin, Martin Mull, Lester Bangs, David Byrne, Steve Martin, Elvis Costello, and Laurie Anderson. (Note: Frank Zappa opined in a 1977 interview for the Toronto Star, "Most rock journalism is people who can't write interviewing people who can’t talk for people who can’t read." He was then misquoted by Rolling Stone, whose editors removed the word "most", misleadingly suggesting that Zappa had condemned the entire medium of rock journalism.)

One of the earliest known usages of the phrase "dancing about architecture" appears in a 1979 Detroit Free Press magazine article, where it is attributed to Martin Mull, although this instance is predated by other print sources that contain similar expressions such as "singing about economics". A 1918 New Republic article remarks,

Strictly considered, writing about music is as illogical as singing about economics. All the other arts can be talked about in the terms of ordinary life and experience. A poem, a statue, a painting or a play is a representation of somebody or something, and can be measurably described (the purely aesthetic values aside) by describing what it represents.

The maxim reappeared in a 1921 article penned by academic Winthrop Parkhurst, who wrote,

Like the musical critic who lamented impotently that "talking about music is like singing about economics," those musicians with a knack for literary expression may quite possibly be frightened off from a task which is reputed to be as arduous as turning "Das Kapital" into a song.

In a 1983 interview, Elvis Costello responded to a question about his treatment in the music press by stating, in part,

Framing all the great music out there only drags down its immediacy. The songs are lyrics, not speeches, and they're tunes, not paintings. Writing about music is like dancing about architecture—it's a really stupid thing to want to do.

Costello subsequently became widely identified with the quote. In a later interview, he denied having originated the phrase, adding with uncertainty that he may have gotten the line from Mull. Laurie Anderson believed that the "dancing about architecture" saying had derived from Steve Martin.

== Criticism ==
Music critic Robert Christgau responded to the maxim:

One of the many foolish things about the fools who compare writing about music to dancing about architecture is that dancing usually is about architecture. When bodies move in relation to a designed space, be it stage or ballroom or living room or gymnasium or agora or Congo Square, they comment on that space whether they mean to or not.

== See also ==
- Microgenres
- Rockism and poptimism
