= The Life and Times of Eddie Roberts =

- Also known as: L.A.T.E.R.
- Genre: Sitcom
- Created by: Ellis Marcus; Ann Marcus
- Written by: Ellis Marcus; Ann Marcus
- Directed by: Tracey Roberts
- Starring: (See article)
- Composer: Peter Kimmel
- Country of origin: United States
- Original language: English
- No. of seasons: 1
- No. of episodes: 65

Production
- Executive producers: Ellis Marcus; Ann Marcus
- Producer: Leonard Friedlander
- Running time: 30 minutes
- Production companies: Marcstone Inc. Productions; Columbia Pictures Television

Original release
- Release: January 7 – April 4, 1980

The Life and Times of Eddie Roberts (also known as L.A.T.E.R.) is an American syndicated television sitcom about a college professor and his family. It was intended to be a spoof of soap operas in the same style as Soap and Mary Hartman, Mary Hartman, but it failed to get the ratings that the other two shows had; it was canceled after 65 episodes, which had been broadcast five days a week over three months in 1980.

== Cast and characters ==
- Renny Temple as Eddie Roberts, a professor at Cranepool University
- Udana Power as Dolores Roberts, Eddie's wife, who's an aspiring major league baseball player
- Joan Hotchkis as Lydia Cranepool Knitzer
- Stephen Parr as Tony Cranepool, a faculty colleague
- Allen Case as Dean Knitzer
- Allison Balson as Chrissy Roberts, Eddie's daughter
- Loyita Chapel as Vivian Blanquette
- Diana Douglas as Diana Roberts
- Maria O'Brien as Chiquita Zamora

== Episodes ==
No.	Title	Directed by	Written by	Original release date
1	"Coming to Grips with One's Sexual Problems"	Marc Daniels	Ann & Ellis Marcus	January 7, 1980
2	"Love Me or Leave Me"	Jim Drake	Ann & Ellis Marcus	January 8, 1980
3	"Those Were the Days"	Jim Drake	Ann & Ellis Marcus	January 9, 1980
4	"Roses Are Red, Violets Are Blue, How About TSU?"	Jim Drake	Ann & Ellis Marcus and Jerry Adelman	January 10, 1980
5	"Dolores and Chrissy Return"	Jim Drake	Ann & Ellis Marcus and Jerry Adelman	January 11, 1980
6	"Stress Is as Stress Does"	Jim Drake	Ann & Ellis Marcus and Michael Robert David	January 14, 1980
7	"School Busing Program Begins"	Robert Nigro	Unknown	January 15, 1980
8	"Racial Warfare, Film at 11"	Robert Nigro	Unknown	January 16, 1980
9	"Contraception with Exception"	Jim Drake	Unknown	January 17, 1980
10	"Cranepool U Gets Ping-Pong Balled"	Jim Drake	Unknown	January 18, 1980
11	"Trying to Get the Feelings Again"	Jim Drake	Unknown	January 21, 1980
12	"Lots of Secrets"	Frank Pacelli	Unknown	January 22, 1980
13	"Take Me Out to the Ball Game"	Jim Drake	Unknown	January 23, 1980
14	"The Truth and Nothing But the Truth"	Jim Drake	Unknown	January 24, 1980
15	"Tell Me Where It Hurts"	Frank Pacelli	Unknown	January 25, 1980
16	"A Remedy for Sexual Dysfunction"	Frank Pacelli	Unknown	January 28, 1980
17	"Will the Real Samantha Higgins Please Stand Up"	Robert Nigro	Unknown	January 29, 1980
18	"It's So Nice to Have a Man Around the House"	Robert Nigro	Unknown	January 30, 1980
19	"Getting to Know You"	Robert Nigro	Unknown	January 31, 1980
20	"And in This Corner"	Robert Nigro	Unknown	February 1, 1980
21	"Cranepool U Announces Tenure Recipient"	Jim Drake	Unknown	February 4, 1980
22	"Monkey Business at Cranepool U"	Jim Drake	Unknown	February 5, 1980
23	"Wait 'Til the Guinness People Find Out"	Jim Drake	Unknown	February 6, 1980
24	"Trying to Solve Problems"	Frank Pacelli	Unknown	February 7, 1980
25	"There's Definitely a Foul at the Kluck O'Rama"	Robert Nigro	Unknown	February 8, 1980
26	"Guess Who's Coming to Dinner?"	Robert Nigro	Unknown	February 11, 1980
27	"Eddie and Dolores and Herb and Marcia"	Jim Drake	Unknown	February 12, 1980
28	"Do Unto Others as They May Do Unto You"	Frank Pacelli	Unknown	February 13, 1980
29	"Pass the Aspirin, Please"	Edward Mallory	Unknown	February 14, 1980
30	"Trying to Deal with a Kidnapping"	Jim Drake	Unknown	February 15, 1980
31	"Trying to Outkid a Kidnapper"	Jim Drake	Unknown	February 18, 1980
32	"How Do You Spell Relief"	Jim Drake	Unknown	February 19, 1980
33	"Playing the Waiting Game"	Frank Pacelli	Unknown	February 20, 1980
34	"Getting Beneath the Surface"	Jim Drake	Unknown	February 21, 1980
35	"Time to Go to Confession"	Robert Nigro	Unknown	February 22, 1980
36	"True Confessions"	Robert Nigro	Unknown	February 25, 1980
37	"A Senatorial Hearing of a Lesser Degree"	Frank Pacelli	Unknown	February 26, 1980
38	"Everybody's Got a Problem"	Jim Drake	Unknown	February 27, 1980
39	"The Ups and Downs of a Relationship"	Jim Drake	Unknown	February 28, 1980
40	"Some Good News and Some Bad News"	Jim Drake	Unknown	February 29, 1980
41	"Child Custody and TSU Side Effects Are Issues of the Day"	Jim Drake	Unknown	March 3, 1980
42	"An End to the Gay Old Life?"	Jim Drake	Unknown	March 4, 1980
43	"Hot News for Everyone, Film at 11"	Jim Drake	Unknown	March 5, 1980
44	"Winging It at the Kluck O'Rama"	Unknown	Unknown	March 6, 1980
45	"Home, Sweet Home"	Jim Drake	Unknown	March 7, 1980
46	"There's No Business Like Porn Business"	Frank Pacelli	Unknown	March 10, 1980
47	"Trying to Understand the Legalese"	Tracy Roberts	Unknown	March 11, 1980
48	"Gertrude's Day in Court"	Jim Drake	Unknown	March 12, 1980
49	"The Press Is After Gertrude"	Frank Pacelli	Unknown	March 13, 1980
50	"Absence Makes the Heart Grow Fonder"	Jim Drake	Unknown	March 14, 1980
51	"Nervous About a Once-in-a-Lifetime Opportunity"	Jim Drake	Unknown	March 17, 1980
52	"Getting to Know You, Getting to Know All About You"	Jim Drake	Unknown	March 18, 1980
53	"A Gay Experience on Television"	Jim Drake	Unknown	March 19, 1980
54	"Do You Promise to Tell the Truth, the Whole Truth?"	Jim Drake	Unknown	March 20, 1980
55	"Perry Mason Would Have Been Proud"	Judi Elterman	Unknown	March 21, 1980
56	"A Paternity Suit for Eddie"	Wes Kenney	Unknown	March 24, 1980
57	"All in the Family"	Tracy Roberts	Unknown	March 25, 1980
58	"An Encounter Session for Eddie's Parents?"	Wes Kenney	Unknown	March 26, 1980
59	"A Request to Call off the Strike"	Wayne Parsons	Unknown	March 27, 1980
60	"Confession Time at Cranepool U"	Wes Kenney	Unknown	March 28, 1980
61	"Here Comes the Bride"	Wes Kenney	Unknown	March 31, 1980
62	"Take Me Out to the Ballgame"	Robert Nigro	Unknown	April 1, 1980
63	"Love Conquers All"	Robert Nigro	Unknown	April 2, 1980
64	"Telling It Like It Is"	Robert Nigro	Unknown	April 3, 1980
65	"One Shocking Revelation After Another"	Robert Nigro	Unknown	April 4, 1980
