= Layin' Low =

- Directed by: Danny Leiner
- Written by: Danny Leiner
- Starring: Jeremy Piven; Louise Lasser; Edie Falco
- Cinematography: Jim Denault
- Edited by: Michelle Botticelli
- Distributed by: Shooting Gallery
- Release date: 18 October 1996 (United States)
- Running time: 96 minutes
- Country: United States
- Language: English

Layin' Low is a 1996 film directed by Danny Leiner and stars Jeremy Piven, Louise Lasser and Edie Falco.

== Plot ==
A New York City loser stumbles upon a mob shootout and ends up with a fat stash of drugs and hides out with a friend's cousin and aunt.
