= Peter Boyles =

American radio talk show personality

Peter Boyles (born October 17, 1943) is a radio talk show personality. He had a long-running morning drive-time show in Denver, Colorado on 630 KHOW, until May 2013. Boyles began his radio career as a traffic reporter in the early 1970s, later becoming a disk jockey. In addition to KHOW, he has worked at Denver radio stations KNUS, KAAT, KLAK, KWBZ, KYBG, and KOA. He retired in April 2022 from his morning program on AM 710 KNUS but returned to the station in September 2022 as host of a four-hour Saturday morning program.

== Talk shows ==
Boyles' morning show on KHOW was reported in 2010 to be Denver's number one-rated morning radio show, and again in 2011.

Boyles received national attention in 1997 for his investigation and nearly constant talk about the death of JonBenét Ramsey. In August 2006 he received intense criticism for his belief that John Mark Karr was not involved in the murder of JonBenet Ramsey. Boyles was vindicated when "the most expensive DNA test in Colorado history" exonerated Karr.

In February 2009, Boyles sparked controversy in Colorado for repeatedly referring to Democratic U.S. Rep. Diana DeGette of Denver as "Vagina DeGette" / "Vagina DeJet" while on air.

Boyles is a defender of the "birtherism" allegation against former president Barack Obama. He claims, "Barack Obama's life story is a fabrication."

In May 2013 Boyles was suspended from his KHOW show after a heated exchange with the show's longtime producer Greg Hollenback. Witnesses reported that Boyles yanked Hollenback's lanyard, which left red marks on Hollenback's neck.

A Colorado Observer editorial expressed that "Boyles is an important figure in our local media and, short of some new and terrible development that no one is reporting, Boyles should keep his job." On June 3, 2013, it was reported that Boyles had been fired.

=== KNUS ===
Salem Communications hired Boyles as its new morning host on News/Talk 710 KNUS as of Monday, July 1 for a 6 AM-9 AM time slot. When Boyles did not appear, there was speculation that his old employer KHOW had blocked his debut due to a non-compete contract clause. On July 3, 2013, at 6:00 am, Boyles' show aired for the first time on 710 KNUS. Beginning January 6, 2014, Boyles' show was extended by one hour, starting at 5:00 am and running until 9:00 am.

KNUS had previously had weak audience ratings for its morning shows, especially compared to KHOW. But in his first month at KNUS, Boyles beat his former employer KHOW in audience ratings for the morning slot.
