= KHOW =

- Denver, Colorado; United States
- Broadcast area: Denver metropolitan area
- Frequency: 630 kHz
- Branding: Talk Radio 630 KHOW

Programming
- Format: Talk radio
- Affiliations: Premiere Networks; ABC News Radio; Compass Media Networks; Westwood One

Ownership
- Owner: iHeartMedia, Inc.; (iHM Licenses, LLC)
- Sister stations: KBCO; KBPI; KDFD; KDHT; KOA; KRFX; KTCL; KWBL

History
- First air date: September 2, 1925
- Former call signs: KFXF (1925–1934); KVOD (1934–1958)

Technical information
- Licensing authority: FCC
- Facility ID: 48962
- Class: B
- Power: 5,000 watts
- Transmitter coordinates: 39°54′36″N 104°54′50″W
- Translator: 100.7 K264BO (Denver)
- Repeater: 103.5 KRFX-HD2 (Denver)

Links
- Public license information: Public file; LMS
- Webcast: Listen live (via iHeartRadio)
- Website: khow.iheart.com

KHOW (630 AM) is a commercial radio station licensed to Denver, Colorado, United States, serving the Denver metropolitan area. KHOW is one of three Denver station owned by iHeartMedia, Inc. that carries a talk format: while co-owned KOA has mostly local shows and KDFD has syndicated programs, KHOW's lineup consists of is a mix of local and syndicated hosts.

Studios are on South Monaco Street in Denver, while the transmitter is sited off East 120th Avenue in Thornton, Colorado. Programming is also heard on an HD Radio digital subchannel of co-owned KRFX (103.5 FM) and on iHeartRadio.

== History ==
- 1925 — KFXF licensed as a new station on September 2 to the Pikes Peak Broadcasting Co., located at 226 Hangerman Building in Colorado Springs. Call sign was randomly assigned from an alphabetical roster of available call letters. William Duncan Pyle was the principal owner.
- 1927 — Station moved from Colorado Springs to Denver.
- 1934 — Call letters changed from KFXF to KVOD ("Voice of Denver") in July.
- 1958 — Call letters changed from KVOD to KHOW on July 27.
- 1974 — Ray Durkee began Sunday at the Memories on KHOW. In 1976 he syndicated the show nationally.
- 1976 — Hal Moore and Charley Martin become a morning team on KHOW.
- 1978 — Alan Berg joined KHOW and became "the most popular (and most disliked) radio personality in Denver."
- August 1979 — Uncomfortable with his style (e.g., insulting or hanging up on callers), KHOW management fired Berg.
- 1984 — Don Martin, KHOW Sky Spy Traffic Reporter, was awarded the Broadcast Achievement Award from the Colorado Broadcasters Association.
- January 3, 1996 — The Rocky Mountain News reported that Charley Martin's contract was not renewed.
- 1997 — Reggie Rivers joined KHOW.
- c. 2010 — Clear Channel's attempt to install an HD transmitter was thwarted by an incompatibility with the station's four-tower antenna array.

== History of ownership ==
- July 1958 — The Federal Communications Commission (FCC) approved the sale of KVOD (as the station was known at the time) to Western Broadcasting Enterprises Inc., for $300,000 plus employment deal, by Colorado Radio Corp.
- 1964 — KHOW was purchased by Trigg-Vaughn of Dallas.
- February 3, 1967 — The FCC announced approval of the sale of the Trigg-Vaughn group of radio and TV stations to Doubleday and Company for $14,125,018. Doubleday Broadcasting Company Inc. was formed; Nelson Doubleday, Jr. served as chairman of this new subsidiary, and Cecil L. Trigg, who had been head of Trigg-Vaughn, continued as president and CEO.
- 1981 — Metromedia Inc. bought KHOW from the Doubleday Broadcasting Company for $15 million.
- 1986 — Metromedia's radio stations, including KHOW, were spun off into a separate company named Metropolitan Broadcasting.
- April 1988 — Robert F.X. Sillerman agreed to acquire KHOW's owner, the Metropolitan Broadcasting Holding Company, for $302 million in cash and debt.
- June 1988 — Carl C. Brazell Jr. agreed to pay $20 million for two of Legacy Broadcasting's stations—KHOW and KSYY-FM—with the intent to make them part of a new entity named Command Communications Inc. Sillerman was a "major investor" in Legacy, and Carl E. Hirsch was the "controlling shareholder."
- November 9, 1989 — Command Communications Inc. said it had agreed to sell KJOI-FM, KSYY-FM and KHOW to Viacom Broadcasting Inc. for $101.5 million. Viacom saw "high growth potential" in these properties.
- November 9, 1992 — Variety reports that Noble Broadcast Group has agreed to acquire KHOW-AM-FM from Viacom Radio of Viacom International Inc.
- 1996 — Jacor Communications purchased Noble Broadcast Group, owner of 10 stations including KHOW, for $152 million.
- 1999 — Clear Channel Communications, now known as iHeartMedia, purchased Jacor for $4.4 billion.

== Former hosts ==
Claudia Lamb; Jay Marvin; Alan Berg; Hal Moore and Charley Martin; Don Wade; Bill Ashford; Harry Smith; Reggie Rivers; Scott Redmond; Peter Boyles; Ray Durkee; Lynn Woods.

Peter Boyles left the station in June 2013 following a scuffle with his producer. Boyles' former slot was filled starting on August 19 when Mandy Connell moved from fellow Clear Channel station WHAS in Louisville. Connell and Brown moved to co-owned KOA.

The longtime morning team of "Hal & Charley" (Hal Moore and Charley Martin) can be heard in the 1980 Stanley Kubrick film The Shining when Dick Hallorann is attempting to reach the Overlook Hotel in Estes Park, Colorado. The station is identified as "63 KHOW" during the sequence. A jingle from the "Class Action" package from JAM Creative Productions is also heard in scene.
