= America 2-Night =

1978 American TV talk show parody series

- Created by: Norman Lear
- Starring: Martin Mull; Fred Willard; Frank De Vol; Tommy Tedesco
- Country of origin: United States
- No. of seasons: 1
- No. of episodes: 65

Production
- Running time: 22–24 minutes
- Production company: T.A.T. Communications Company

Original release
- Network: Syndication
- Release: April 10 – July 7, 1978

Related
- Fernwood 2 Night

America 2-Night is the continuation of the talk-show parody series Fernwood 2 Night, broadcast weeknights from April 10 to July 7, 1978. As on Fernwood, Martin Mull portrays host Barth Gimble and Fred Willard appears as sidekick/announcer Jerry Hubbard. Frank De Vol returns as bandleader Happy Kyne.

== Premise ==
After being picked up by the UBS network, Fernwood 2-Night was revamped as America 2-Night and moved from the fictional Fernwood, Ohio, to the fictional "Quad-City" area of Alta Coma, El Tijo, Alta Luna and the City of Merchandise in Southern California. According to Hubbard's announcement at the beginning of every show, Alta Coma was "the unfinished furniture capital of the world!". This new Southern California setting made it more plausible for Hollywood celebrities to appear on the show as themselves. Among the celebrities who appeared as guests were Vincent Price, George Gobel, Carol Burnett, Burt Lancaster, Steve Allen, Milton Berle, Paul Lynde, Rita Moreno, Barbara Feldon, Cindy Williams, Rob Reiner, Carl Reiner, Peter Frampton, Mark Hamill, Gary Coleman, Karen Black, Steve Garvey, Arte Johnson, Sherman Hemsley, Shari Lewis, McLean Stevenson, Billy Crystal, Robert Conrad, Abe Vigoda, Connie Stevens, Anne Murray, Lou Rawls, Tom Waits, Vikki Carr and José Feliciano. In the final episode, Mull and Willard appeared as themselves.

America 2 Night was broadcast on the fictional UBS network, located on the UBS Broadcast Mall, whose logo featured an ear (a spoof of the CBS "Eye" logo) and whose slogan was "We put U before the BS".

In 2001, Martin Mull and Fred Willard reprised their roles of Barth and Jerry in a stage appearance and retrospective at the US Comedy Arts Festival in Aspen, Colorado.

== Recurring characters ==
- William W.D. 'Bud' Prize (Kenneth Mars)
- Susan Cloud (Susan Eliott)
- Tony Rolletti (Bill Kirchenbauer)
- Virgil Simms (Jim Varney)
- Rabbi Abraham 'Shecky' Stein (Kip King)
- Jason Shine (Robin Williams)
- Chuck Emmitt Saugis (Paul Willson)

== Syndication ==
Repeats of Fernwood/America 2 Night were broadcast on Nick at Nite from 1990 to 1993 and TV Land in 2002. Although ten episodes of Fernwood 2 Night were issued in 2013 as bonus material as part of the Shout!Factory complete Mary Hartman, Mary Hartman series DVD boxed set, America 2 Night has never been officially released on home video in any format.

== See also ==
- List of late night network TV programs
