= Mark Soper =

American actor

- Born: July 19, 1959 (age 66); Boyertown, Pennsylvania, U.S.
- Occupation: Actor
- Website: markjsoper.com

Mark Soper (born July 19, 1959) is an American actor, best known as Joseph Barringer in the television series Knots Landing and Michael Milton in The World According to Garp. Soper is from Boyertown, Pennsylvania.

== Filmography ==
=== Film ===
Mark Soper film credits
Year	Title	Role	Notes
1982	The World According to Garp	Michael Milton	
1982	Tempest	Mark	
1987	Blood Rage	Todd Simmons / Terry Simmons	
1988	The In Crowd	Station Manager	
1988	The Understudy: Graveyard Shift II	Matthew	
1996	Phenomenon	Reporter	
2000	Delicate Instruments	Dean McIntyre	Short film
2001	Swordfish	FBI Geek	
2002	White Oleander	Patrick	

=== Television ===
Mark Soper television credits
Year	Title	Role	Notes
1980	Attica	Gary Lyle	TV movie
1980	Wilson's Reward	Reverend James	TV movie
1982	Parole	Jimmy McCusick	TV movie
1982	T.J. Hooker	David Harmon	Episode: "The Survival Syndrome"
1985–1987	The Equalizer	Eugene Benton / Ken Whitten Jr.	2 episodes
1991–1992	Knots Landing	Joseph Barringer	11 episodes
2000	Judging Amy	Ben Fleming	Episode: "Zero Tolerance"
2000	Bar Hopping	Waiter	TV movie
