= Flicks (film) =

Ficks
- Directed by: Peter Winograd
- Written by: Peter Winograd; David Hurwitz; Lane Sarasohn
- Starring: Martin Mull
- Production company: Triple Features Productions
- Release date: 1981
- Running time: 79 minutes
- Country: United States
- Language: English
- Budget: $3 million

Flicks, also known as Loose Joints, is a 1981 anthology comedy film consisting of a series of comedic segments themed after Saturday afternoon matinées.

== Segments ==
=== No Way, Jose ===
A parody of coming attractions where a trailer for a film called No Way, Jose makes lofty promises of an all star cast and extensive location shooting before saying it was too expensive to actually make.

=== Cat and Mouse at (the) Home ===
A parody of Tom and Jerry cartoons, a cartoon cat and mouse reminisce about their careers chasing and beating each other up at a retirement home for cartoon characters while lamenting the diminished quality of modern cartoons which leads them back into their old habits.

=== News 'R' Us ===
A parody of Newsreel filmstrips featuring stories such as the collapse of a spice factory from every employee sneezing at once, Siamese twins being compressed into one single individual, the cartoon duo of Cat and Mouse announcing their retirement, and the sensation of "whacking" (with paddleball toys) takes the world by storm..

=== Lost Heroes of the Milky Way ===
A commander on board a space station deals with small-scale annoyances from mechanical breakdowns and striking staff.

==== Cast ====
- Joan Hackett
- Richard Belzer as Stoner
- Martin Mull as Tang the Tasteless

=== Phillip Alien. Space Detective ===
A space-themed noir segment following an insectoid alien detective

=== House of the Horny Corpse ===
A married couple buys an old Victorian house only to discover it is haunted by a man who mails surgically removed parts of himself to his neighbors.

==== Cast ====
- Martin Mull as Arthur Lyle
- Betty Kennedy as Beth Lyle

== Production ==
The idea for the film originated with Peter Winograd who took the concept to Saturday Night Live writers David Hurwitz and Larry Arnstein, and The Groove Tube Lane Sarasohn with whom Winograd routinely played basketball. Following troubled preview screenings, United Film Distributors recut the film without input from Winograd and re-titled it Loose Joints. The animated segment Cat and Mouse at (the) Home was animated by Mark Kausler and directed by Kirk Henderson. The four and a half minute long short took six months to produce, and was made by San Francisco based animation studio Colossal Pictures.

== Release ==
The film was released on videocassette on May 23, 1987.
