= Ellis Marcus =

American television writer

- Born: May 6, 1918 Pittsburgh, Pennsylvania, United States
- Died: June 23, 1990 (aged 72) Encino, California, United States
- Occupation: Television writer
- Spouse: Ann Marcus (1921–2014)
- Children: 3

Ellis Marcus (May 6, 1918 – June 23, 1990), was an American television writer whose career spanned four decades. He contributed episodes to over fifty television programs from 1949 through 1984. His wife, Ann (1921–2014), was a writer and producer; the couple had three children.

== Career ==
Marcus got his start writing for live television shows in New York in the 1940s. His credits include episodic work on television shows such as Highway Patrol, Lassie, Falcon Crest, and Mission Impossible. He and his wife created the soap opera spoof, The Life and Times of Eddie Roberts, also commonly known as L.A.T.E.R., together. They both served as producers on the show.

In the late 1980s, Marcus was a Governor of the Academy of Television Arts and Sciences. He died of a heart attack at the age of 72 in Encino, California.

== Filmography ==
=== Films ===
Year	Film	Credit	Notes
1954	Ride Clear of Diablo	Story By	
1958	Destination Nightmare	Writer	Composed of footage from 4 episodes of the TV series "The Veil"
1979	Women at West Point	Screenplay By	Co-Wrote screenplay with "Ann Marcus"

=== Television ===
Year	TV Series	Credit	Notes
1949–50	Ford Theatre	Writer	5 Episodes
1950	The Nash Airflyte Theater	Writer	2 Episodes
1950–53	Lux Video Theatre	Writer	4 Episodes
1951	Robert Montgomery Presents	Writer	1 Episode
1951	The Roy Rogers Show	Writer	1 Episode
1953	Chevron Theatre	Writer	1 Episode
1954	December Bride	Writer	4 Episodes
1954	Mr. District Attorney	Writer	2 Episodes
1954	Your Favorite Story	Writer	1 Episode
1954–55	Willy	Writer	3 Episodes
1954–56	I Led 3 Lives	Writer	11 Episodes
1955	Captain Midnight	Writer	1 Episode
1955	The Whistler	Writer	1 Episode
1955–56	Science Fiction Theatre	Writer	4 Episodes
1956	The Count of Monte Cristo	Writer	1 Episode
1956	Dr. Christian	Writer	1 Episode
1956–57	The Man Called X	Writer	4 Episodes
1957	The Millionaire	Writer	1 Episode
1957	Broken Arrow	Writer	1 Episode
1957	West Point	Writer	1 Episode
1957	Casey Jones	Writer	1 Episode
1957	The New Adventures of Martin Kane	Writer	1 Episode
1957-58	White Hunter	Writer	2 Episodes
1957-58	Richard Diamond, Private Detective	Writer	2 Episodes
1957–59	Highway Patrol	Writer	5 Episodes
1958	Climax!	Writer	1 Episode
1958	Sea Hunt	Writer	5 Episodes
1958	Colgate Theatre	Writer	1 Episode
1958	Flight	Writer	1 Episode
1958	The Veil	Writer	1 Episode
1958-59	Lassie	Writer	3 Episodes
1958-59	Wanted: Dead or Alive	Writer	2 Episodes
1959	The Magical World of Disney	Writer	2 Episodes
1960	The Detectives	Writer	1 Episode
1961	Leave It to Beaver	Writer	1 Episode
1961	The Aquanauts	Writer	4 Episodes
1961	The Hathaways	Writer	2 Episodes
1961	Target: The Corruptors!	Writer	1 Episode
1962	The Lloyd Bridges Show	Writer	1 Episode
1962	Tales of Wells Fargo	Writer	2 Episodes
1962–63	Sam Benedict	Writer	4 Episodes
1963	The Eleventh Hour	Writer	1 Episode
1963	The Lieutenant	Writer	1 Episode
1964	The Man from U.N.C.L.E.	Writer	1 Episode
1964–65	Ben Casey	Writer	2 Episodes
1966	12 O'Clock High	Writer	1 Episode
1966	Mission Impossible	Writer	4 Episodes
1967	Cimarron Strip	Writer	1 Episode
1972	Mannix	Writer	1 Episode
1973–74	Shaft	Writer	2 Episodes
1974	The Cowboys	Writer	1 Episode
1980	The Life and Times of Eddie Roberts	Writer, Creator, Executive Producer	65 Episodes
1981	Flamingo Road	Writer	1 Episode
1981–82	Knots Landing	Writer, Executive Story Editor	22 Episodes
1984	Falcon Crest	Writer	1 Episode
1987–89	General Hospital	Writer, Associate Head Writer	11 Episodes
