= Neurotic =

Neurotic may refer to:

- Neurosis, a class of functional mental disorders involving distress but neither delusions nor hallucinations
- Neuroticism, a fundamental personality trait characterized by anxiety, moodiness, worry, envy and jealousy
- Newtown Neurotics, or simply The Neurotics, an English punk rock band
- Neurotic (EP), an EP by the US punk band The Bouncing Souls
