= Fernwood 2 Night =

- Genre: Talk show; Satire
- Created by: Norman Lear
- Starring: Martin Mull; Fred Willard; Frank De Vol; Tommy Tedesco
- Country of origin: United States
- No. of seasons: 1
- No. of episodes: 65

Production
- Running time: 22 minutes
- Production company: T.A.T. Communications Company

Original release
- Network: First-run syndication
- Release: July 4 – September 30, 1977

Related
- America 2-Night (1978)

Fernwood 2 Night (or Fernwood Tonight) is a satirical comedy talk show that was broadcast in syndication weeknights from July 4 to September 30, 1977. The program was created by Norman Lear and produced by Alan Thicke as a spinoff and summer replacement for Lear's satirical soap opera Mary Hartman, Mary Hartman. The show was hosted by Barth Gimble (Martin Mull) and sidekick announcer Jerry Hubbard (Fred Willard). Dour bandleader Happy Kyne (Frank De Vol) and the Mirth Makers were the show's stage band, featuring Tommy Tedesco on guitar. Happy also owned the "Bun n' Run", a local fast food restaurant.

== Overview and production ==
Fernwood 2 Night is set in the fictional small town of Fernwood, Ohio, the same setting for Mary Hartman, Mary Hartman, in which Barth's wife-beating twin brother Garth Gimble (also portrayed by Mull), died after being impaled on an aluminum Christmas tree. Fernwood 2-Night parodies late-night talk shows and the local television content produced in midwestern American towns. Fernwood 2 Night was the first television talk-show satire, foreshadowing The Larry Sanders Show, Space Ghost Coast to Coast, Jiminy Glick, and Comedy Bang! Bang!.

Fernwood 2-Night was originally intended as a one season summer replacement for Mary Hartman, Mary Hartman but the show's popularity led to its return for a second season. Because many real-life celebrities wished to appear on the program, it was revamped as America 2 Night for the second season and the setting of the show was changed from Fernwood, Ohio to the fictional California city of Alta Coma ("the unfinished furniture capital of the world!"). The move to southern California made it more plausible for entertainment celebrities to appear on the show as themselves. The revamped America 2 Night debuted on April 10, 1978.

In 2001, Mull and Willard reprised their roles as Barth and Jerry in a stage appearance and retrospective at the US Comedy Arts Festival in Aspen, Colorado. The pair also worked together in other projects, appearing together as a gay couple in the final seasons of Roseanne.

Reruns of Fernwood and America 2 Night were broadcast on Nick at Nite from 1990 to 1993 and TV Land in 2002 as part of its "TV Land Kitschen" block, also hosted by Mull and Willard.

In 2013, ten episodes of Fernwood 2 Night were included as bonus material in the Mary Hartman, Mary Hartman complete series DVD boxed set, issued by Shout!Factory. Apart from this release, Fernwood 2 Night and America 2 Night have never been available on home video in any format.

== Recurring characters ==
- Merle Jeeter (Dabney Coleman), Fernwood's somewhat shifty, self-promoting mayor.
- William W.D. "Bud" Prize (Kenneth Mars), Fernwood's "ambassador at large" from the chamber of commerce and the mayor's supposed energy expert; he wears elaborate "chinodontic" headgear designed to correct his underbite.
- Tony Rolletti (Bill Kirchenbauer), an enthusiastic, but not very talented, lounge singer.
- Susan Cloud (Susan Elliot), the spaced-out owner of the Butterfly Deli, a local health-food restaurant.
- Virgil Simms (Jim Varney), a local mechanic who offers automotive advice and later becomes a "motor-home daredevil", performing stunts in the style of Evel Knievel but while driving a motor home.
- Garth Gimble Sr. (Robert Williams), Barth's father, who is also the cheerfully incompetent studio security guard. He is almost always seen with Louie, his lethargic English Springer Spaniel.
- Lou Moffat (Lou Felder), a "consumer affairs expert" who plugs various products distributed by Barth's company, Gimbleco Enterprises.
- Debbie Dunbar (Kathy McCullen), Fernwood's controversial teenage "Spanking Girl."
- Mrs. Dunbar (Jan Stratton), Debbie's outraged mother.
- Larry Guy (Terry McGovern), a local disc jockey.
- Dr. Richard Osgood/Van Moot (Craig Richard Nelson), a physician and research scientist who discovers that leisure suits cause cancer.

== Trivia ==
While there is an actual, small, rural community in Ohio named Fernwood, located in Jefferson County, it is unrelated to the fictional town of Fernwood, Ohio of Fernwood 2 Night and Mary Hartman, Mary Hartman. In episode 39, Barth introduces a guest who runs a "nude dude ranch" near Farrington, in Miami County, which places the fictional Fernwood somewhere near Dayton, Ohio.

== See also ==
- List of late-night network TV programs
