= Claudia Lamb =

American actress

- Born: December 3, 1963 (age 62)
- Occupations: Actor, Radio Journalist
- Television: Mary Hartman, Mary Hartman

Claudia Lamb (born December 3, 1963) is a former radio journalist and child actress known for portraying Heather Hartman in the syndicated soap opera satire Mary Hartman, Mary Hartman as well as the show's sequel Forever Fernwood. About six months before being cast in "Mary Hartman, Mary Hartman," Claudia appeared in a 1975 commercial for Nestle's $100,000 bar.

Lamb became a talk radio show host, hosting programs in Kansas City, Missouri (at KCMO (AM)) and at KHOW-AM in Denver, Colorado.

Later, she became a radio traffic reporter for radio station KOA in Denver. In 2004, her team won a Colorado Broadcasting Award for best coverage in Breaking News. In 2005, she became a news reporter for KLIV in San Jose, California.

Lamb was also a public information officer for the Colorado Traffic Management Center in Denver and wrote articles on traffic management for their online webzine, CoTrip Quarterly, which has since ceased publication.

Lamb worked as a writer and producer for the afternoon news at KGO (AM) in San Francisco, California from 2007 to November 2011.

During her tenure, her team won the national Edward R. Murrow Award for best coverage of Breaking News. According to Lamb, she resigned from KGO after it was purchased by Citadel Broadcasting which led to massive layoffs and previous news standards could no longer be maintained.
