= Mary Hartman, Mary Hartman =

American television series (1976–1977)

- Title card
- Created by: Gail Parent; Ann Marcus; Jerry Adelman; Daniel Gregory Browne
- Developed by: Norman Lear
- Starring: Louise Lasser; Greg Mullavey; Mary Kay Place; Graham Jarvis; Debralee Scott; Dody Goodman; Philip Bruns; Claudia Lamb; Victor Kilian
- Theme music composer: Barry White
- Opening theme: "Premiere Occasion"
- Composer: Earle Hagen
- Country of origin: United States
- No. of seasons: 2
- No. of episodes: 325

Production
- Producer: Viva Knight
- Running time: 23 minutes
- Production companies: Filmways; T.A.T. Communications Company

Original release
- Network: Syndication
- Release: January 5, 1976 – July 1, 1977

Mary Hartman, Mary Hartman is an American satirical soap opera broadcast on weeknights from January 1976 to July 1977. The syndicated series follows Mary Hartman, a small-town Ohio housewife attempting to cope with various bizarre and sometimes violent incidents occurring in her daily life.

The series was produced by Norman Lear, directed by Joan Darling, Jim Drake, Nessa Hyams, and Giovanna Nigro, and starred Louise Lasser, Greg Mullavey, Dody Goodman, Mary Kay Place, Graham Jarvis, Debralee Scott, Victor Kilian, Philip Bruns, and Claudia Lamb. The series writers were Gail Parent and Ann Marcus.

Developed by Lear to examine the effects of consumerism on the American housewife, the series was videotaped at KTLA Studios in Los Angeles. The show was syndicated and aired on a wide variety of television stations, including PBS Member WPBT-2 in Miami across its first six months, based on historical recordings of WHYI-FM "Y-100" morning host Bill Tanner from July 1976.

In 2004 and 2007, Mary Hartman, Mary Hartman was ranked number 21 and number 26 on "TV Guide's Top Cult Shows Ever."

In 2009, TV Guide ranked the first-season episode involving the death of Coach Leroy Fedders, who drowns in a bowl of Mary's chicken soup, as number 97 on its list of "TV's Top 100 Episodes of All Time".

== Premise and series overview ==
Mary Hartman, Mary Hartman follows the title character, a Candide-esque TV-watching housewife, through increasingly complex and compounding life events and scenarios often reflective of the changing social fabric of the 1970s.

Some of Mary's key traits, unusual but prescient for the times, include her typically numb response to both external and emotional conflicts, her indecisiveness, and her tendency to suddenly snap out of one state of mind and swing to its opposite. Moral quandaries frequently seem on the verge of vanishing into apathy, until she is reminded of her love for her family and the need to keep them together.

The show's convoluted, contrived plots and tongue-in-cheek melodrama lampooned the soap opera format in a similar manner to its '70s successor Soap and later Twin Peaks.

In the first episode, Mary Hartman introduces the Lombardi family of five, all of whom, along with their two goats and eight chickens, have been murdered by young Davey Jessup. The event was witnessed by both Mary's daughter, Heather, and the "Fernwood Flasher", who is later revealed to be Mary's grandfather, Raymond Larkin.

Other characters also die in bizarre ways, including electrocution in a bathtub (Jimmy Joe Jeeter), drowning in chicken soup (Coach Leroy Fedders), and being impaled on a pink bottle brush artificial Christmas tree (Garth Gimble).

Mary Hartman had a nationally televised nervous breakdown on The David Susskind Show at the end of the first season. She then found herself in a psychiatric ward, where she was delighted to be part of their selected Nielsen ratings' "family". One of her sanitarium mates, widowed Wanda Rittenhouse (Marian Mercer), became more prominent later, when she married Merle Jeeter, the mayor of Fernwood.

The series' second and final season ends with Mary finding herself in the same predicament she was in during the pilot. Despite having moved into a new house with her boyfriend Dennis (Bruce Solomon), Mary is still battling the waxy yellow buildup on her kitchen floor.

== Cast ==
=== Main cast ===
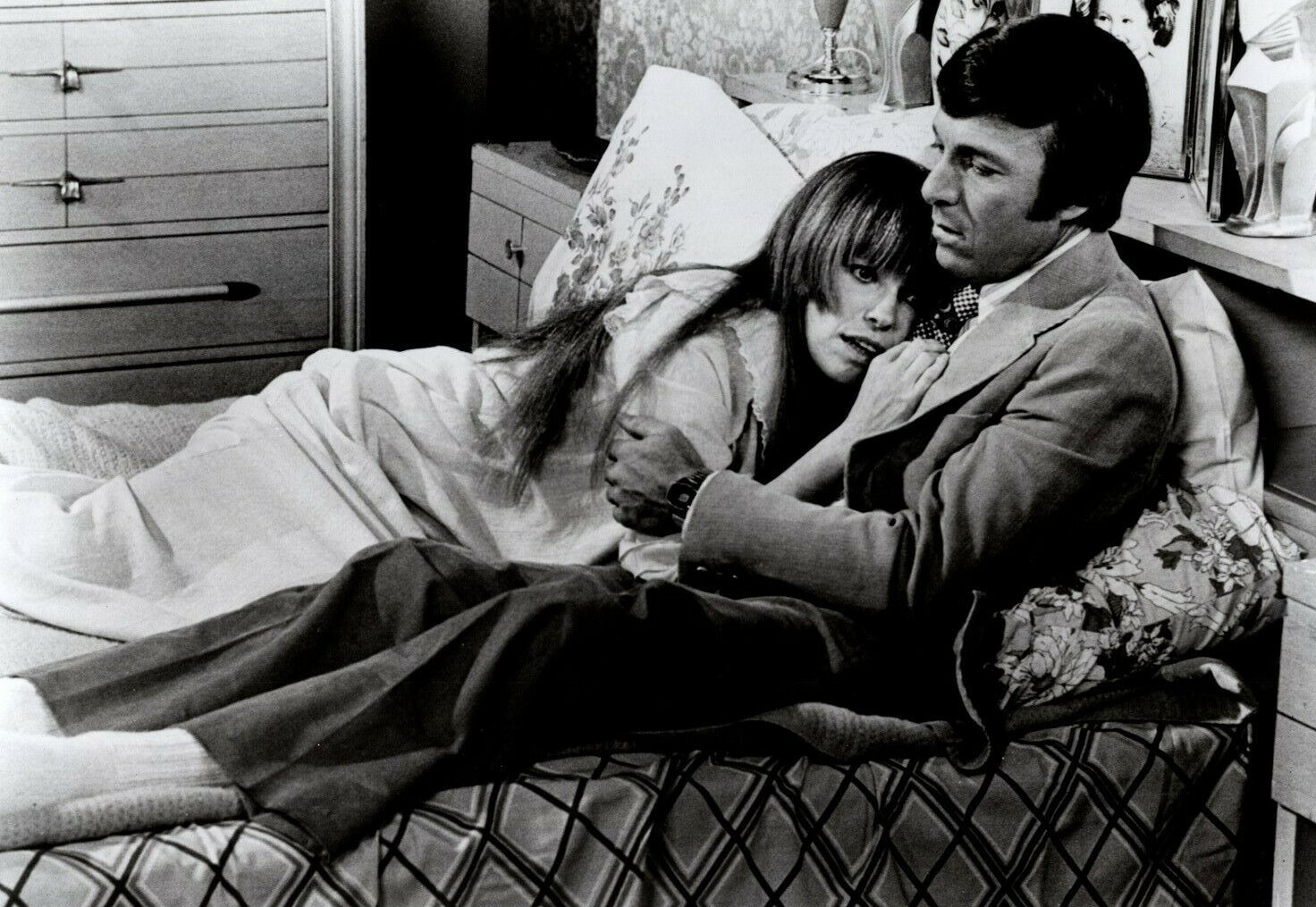
Louise Lasser (Mary Hartman) and Greg Mullavey (Tom) in a publicity still

- Louise Lasser as Mary Shumway Hartman, the title character, an Ohio housewife.
- Greg Mullavey as Tom Hartman, Mary's unfaithful husband and Heather's father. Works on an assembly line.
- Mary Kay Place as Loretta Haggers, Mary's best friend and neighbor, and aspiring country singer.
- Graham Jarvis as Charlie "Baby Boy" Haggers, Loretta's much older husband and Tom Hartman's best friend and coworker.
- Dody Goodman as Martha Shumway, Mary's often daft mother known for talking to her plants.
- Debralee Scott as Cathy Lorraine Shumway, Mary's vampish sister.
- Victor Kilian as Grandpa Raymond Larkin, Martha's father, who was revealed in the pilot episode to be the "Fernwood Flasher."
- Philip Bruns (and for a few episodes after the show was rebranded as Forever Fernwood, Tab Hunter) as George Shumway, Martha's husband and Mary and Cathy's father. He worked at an automobile assembly plant along with Tom and Charlie.
- Claudia Lamb as Heather Hartman, Tom and Mary's troubled adolescent daughter.

=== Supporting cast ===
- Samantha Harper as Roberta Wolashek, Grandpa Larkin's young social worker, who falls in love with him.
- Salome Jens as Mae Olinski, Tom's Amazonian co-worker at the assembly plant and the payroll officer, with whom he had an affair.
- Bruce Solomon as Sgt. Dennis Foley, a Fernwood police officer who liked Mary and with whom she eventually ran off. (See Forever Fernwood, below.)
- Norman Alden as Coach Leroy Fedders, Tom's former high school coach. He died drowning in Mary's chicken soup.
- Reva Rose as Blanche Fedders, Coach Fedders' constantly protesting and militant wife.
- Martin Mull as hateful wife-beater Garth Gimble, who died by being impaled by a star on an aluminum Christmas tree. Mull later played Garth's twin brother, Barth Gimble, a more overtly comic character who showed up in Fernwood to lay low after some sort of trouble in Miami. After playing Barth on MHMH for a handful of episodes, Barth was spun off to on his own series, the talk show parody Fernwood 2 Night (which later evolved into America 2-Night).
- Susan Browning as Garth's wife, Pat, the target of his abuse.
- Sparky Marcus as Jimmy Joe Jeeter, child evangelist, who died when a TV set he was watching fell into the bathtub, electrocuting him.
- Dabney Coleman as Merle Jeeter, Fernwood's slightly devious mayor and Jimmy Joe's father.
- Marian Mercer as Wanda Rittenhouse Jeeter, a widow of a city commissioner and a former sanitarium mate of Mary's, who became Jeeter's second wife while also carrying on a relationship with their maid, Lila.
- Gloria DeHaven as CB radio aficionado Annie "Tippy-toes" Wylie, who also had an affair with Tom Hartman.
- Orson Bean as Reverend Brim, one of Fernwood's clergymen, mainly in Forever Fernwood.
- George Furth as Reverend Harold Standfast, who helped Mary through the Davey Jessup hostage crisis. He had to swear on a stack of Bibles to have Mary released, but only did so after being threatened with the exposure of an extramarital affair he had with Florence Baedecker, the choir mistress of his church.
- Mary Carver as Christine Standfast, Reverend Standfast's wife, who knew all about her husband's extramarital affair.
- Shelley Fabares as Eleanor Major, a woman who Tom Hartman fell in love with after Mary had left him and Heather for Sgt. Foley.
- Judith Kahan as Penny Major, Eleanor's sister, who married Tom Hartman in the series finale.
- Will Seltzer as Davey Jessup, the murderer of the Lombardi family, their two goats and eight chickens, who held Mary and Sgt. Foley hostage. Before that, he had also held Mary's daughter Heather and her best friend, Trudy Weathersby, hostage.
- Doris Roberts as Dorelda Doremus, a faith healer.
- Michael Lembeck as Clete Meizenheimer, television news reporter for Fernwood's local television station.
- Archie Hahn as Harold Clemens, a reporter for the town's newspaper, the Fernwood Courier.
- Vivian Blaine as Betty McCullough, Mary's fortune teller neighbor who was helping her son and his male partner hide their true relationship.
- Sid Haig as Texas, a production worker at the automobile plant in Fernwood.
- Ed Begley Jr. as Steve, a deaf man who dated Cathy.
- John Heffernan as Chester Markham.
- Laurence Haddon as Ed McCullough
- Beeson Carroll as Howard McCullough
- Hugh Gillin as Tiny

== History and production ==
In December 1974, Norman Lear and his entertainment company, Tandem Productions, created a pilot for his new serial, Mary Hartman, Mary Hartman, a satire of the impact of American consumerism. The pilot, consisting of two episodes and shot on a $100,000 (equal to $652,834 today)budget, was not picked up by the networks.

Lear then pursued a syndication strategy by hiring a sales agent to sell the show at the 1976 National Association of Television Program Executives (NATPE) market in San Francisco. The mostly independent stations that picked up the show began calling themselves the Mary Hartman Network. KING-TV of Seattle became the first station to procure syndication rights to Mary Hartman, Mary Hartman.

Norman Lear announced the show's cancellation in April 1977. The show ended on July 1st of the same year.

Mary Hartman, Mary Hartman was filmed at KTLA Studios in Los Angeles.

== Music ==
The theme song, "Premiere Occasion", was selected from the stock music library Southern Library of Recorded Music. It was written by British composer Robert Charles Kingston under the pseudonym Barry White and copyrighted in 1965, 10 years before Mary Hartman, Mary Hartman first aired, lending the illusion of a soap opera that already had a long history. Incidental music for the series was mostly written by Earle Hagen.

As country and western singer-songwriter Loretta Haggers, Mary Kay Place sang a number of songs over the course of the series. Place wrote some of those songs herself, including "Baby Boy" and "Vitamin L", both of which were issued as singles by Columbia Records in 1976. "Baby Boy" was a minor hit for Loretta Haggers in the series, which she played to a nationwide audience live on the set of Dinah! in one episode, as well as a minor hit for Place, spending 13 weeks on the Billboard Hot 100 chart and peaking at No. 60. Place also released a full album of Loretta Haggers's music, Tonite! At the Capri Lounge Loretta Haggers.

Several songs have been written about Mary Hartman, many of them incorporating elements of the theme song. All-woman rock group The Deadly Nightshade's disco-flavored "Mary Hartman, Mary Hartman (Theme)" reached No. 79 on the Hot 100, and at least four other Mary Hartman-related disco songs were released by Vincent Montana Jr., Sammy Davis Jr., Floyd Cramer, and The Marketts during the show's run.

== The dollhouse incident/Lasser's arrest ==
In the spring of 1976, Lasser was arrested at a Los Angeles charity boutique. Police found $6 worth (or 88 milligrams) of cocaine in her purse. Authorities were called after Lasser's American Express card was denied and she refused to leave without possession of a $150 dollhouse. Lasser was initially apprehended for two unpaid traffic tickets (one for jaywalking), but the officers then found the cocaine in her handbag. She claimed a fan had given her the drug several months earlier.

Lasser was ordered to six months in counseling, which was easily satisfied as she was already seeing an analyst. A fictionalized version of Lasser's refusal to leave a store without a dollhouse was also incorporated into Mary Hartman's first season.

== Legacy ==
As MH2's ratings soared in 1976, Ted Morgan wrote in The New York Times: "No longer merely a television program, Mary Hartman, Mary Hartman has become a cultural event, in the same league as those other sociological signposts that culture watchers...are always on the lookout for to help us explain ourselves."

According to Lasser: "People always say it’s way ahead of its time. I never thought it was ahead of its time. I always thought it was of its time."

Of the series' influence on pop culture, Claire Barliant observes: "For some, the 1970s...was a descent into chaos, a dissolution of self, but also a kind of awakening....The seventies nervous breakdown coincides with women's lib and a strengthening gay rights movement....MH2 is relevant today because it entertains but still shocks, because the social commentary and satire and bravery of the show are as fresh as ever."

Critic Matthew Eng adds that MH2 has "all the audacity and agitation of American cinema’s most daring decade, packaged into the prodigious shape of an oddly acted, garishly designed, choppily edited serial."

"It was certainly one of the darkest, most satirical shows ever seen on television, and the fact that it premiered during America’s bicentennial year makes it even more significant,” notes Ron Simon of the Paley Center for Media. Media scholar Robert Thompson further maintains: “For those who revisit the show now, it stands as a time capsule of just how brilliant and sophisticated television could be.”

In 2000, Lasser appeared on a panel with her former MH2 cast and crew members at the Paley Center for Media in Beverly Hills for a seminar, Mary Hartman, Mary Hartman: Reunion, Reunion. The panel was moderated by Steven A. Bell and recorded for the museum archives.

In 2004 and 2007, Mary Hartman, Mary Hartman was ranked number 21 and number 26 on "TV Guide's Top Cult Shows Ever."

== Forever Fernwood ==
When Lasser left the show in 1977, it was followed by Forever Fernwood, which dealt with the trials and tribulations of Mary's family and friends after she had run away with police sergeant Dennis Foley, with whom she had had a lot of contact during the first season. Aside from Lasser, the rest of the cast remained intact even as new actors joined the cast: Shelley Fabares as Eleanor Major, who began dating Tom after Mary had left him; Judith Kahan as Eleanor's stuttering sister, Penny Major; and Randall Carver as Cathy Shumway's gangster husband, Jeffrey DeVito. On the last episode of the series, Penny married Tom Hartman. Forever Fernwood ended in 1978, after 26 weeks on the air (130 half-hour episodes).

== Spin-offs ==
During the summer of 1977, Fernwood 2 Night, a local talk show satire and parody starring Martin Mull as Barth Gimble, was broadcast as a spin-off/summer replacement for Mary Hartman, Mary Hartman. For the following season, the show was slightly revamped and broadcast "nationwide" via the fictional UBS network as America 2-Night in the spring of 1978.

== Planned reboot ==
In February 2021, it was reported that a reboot of the series was in development by Sony Pictures Television with Emily Hampshire as writer and starring role, Jacob Tierney as co-writer, and Lear and Brent Miller as executive producers. In July 2021, it was announced that TBS had given a series order. In April 2022, it was announced the series was scrapped alongside all scripted programming on TBS. Lear later sought to revive the project, and was working on developing the reboot until shortly before his death in 2023.

== In popular culture ==
The show was parodied several times during its run:

- On the Bob Hope's Bicentennial Star Spangled Spectacular television special on July 4, 1976, Hope performed a skit, "Mary Hartford, Mary Hartford" (in reference to Hartford, Connecticut), set during the American Revolution with Debbie Reynolds as Mary Hartford.

- On Donny & Marie, a series of skits titled "Marie Heartburn, Marie Heartburn" were performed with Marie Osmond playing the titular role along with Donny Osmond and special guests.

- The Carol Burnett Show had Harvey Korman portraying "Norman Blear" introducing the series for children titled "Mary, Mary Quite Contrary, Mary, Mary Quite Contrary" by using nursery rhyme characters, with Burnett in the lead role, and Tim Conway as her eccentric grandfather, Wee Willie Winkie, running around "flashing" people in his panda nightgown (in reference to the Fernwood Flasher).

== Home video ==
=== VHS ===
- The Best of Mary Hartman, Mary Hartman Volume I. Videocassette. Embassy Home Entertainment.
- The Best of Mary Hartman, Mary Hartman Volume II. Videocassette. Embassy Home Entertainment.

=== DVD ===
On March 27, 2007, Sony Pictures Home Entertainment released Mary Hartman, Mary Hartman Volume One on DVD in Region 1. The three-disc boxset features the first 25 episodes of Season 1, dealing with the Fernwood Flasher and Lombardi massacre storylines. Many of the episodes were the syndication versions, heavily edited to fit more commercials in the broadcasts, due to cost issues when about to remaster and transfer the original broadcast versions.

On August 28, 2013, it was announced that Shout! Factory had acquired the rights to the series and released Mary Hartman, Mary Hartman: The Complete Series on DVD in Region 1 on December 3, 2013. The 38-disc set features all 325 episodes. The Season 1 episodes were restored to their full-length broadcast versions and other bonus features, such as interviews with Lear, Lasser, and Place, are included.

== Syndication ==
Mary Hartman, Mary Hartman was syndicated on local stations briefly in 1982 and later broadcast on Lifetime Television in 1994 and TV Land in 2002.

== See also ==
- America 2-Night (1978)
- Fernwood 2 Night (1977)
- All That Glitters (1977)
- The Life and Times of Eddie Roberts (1980)
- Soap (1977)
- 1976 in American television
