= The Happening (1967 film) =

1967 film by Elliot Silverstein

- Theatrical release poster
- Directed by: Elliot Silverstein
- Screenplay by: Frank R. Pierson; James D. Buchanan; Ronald Austin
- Story by: James D. Buchanan; Ronald Austin
- Produced by: Jud Kinberg; Sam Spiegel
- Starring: Anthony Quinn; Michael Parks; George Maharis; Robert Walker Jr. Martha Hyer; Faye Dunaway
- Cinematography: Philip H. Lathrop; Howard Winner
- Edited by: Philip W. Anderson
- Music by: Frank De Vol
- Production company: Horizon Pictures
- Distributed by: Columbia Pictures
- Release date: March 22, 1967
- Running time: 101 minutes
- Country: United States
- Language: English

The Happening is a 1967 American crime comedy film directed by Elliot Silverstein, and starring Anthony Quinn, Michael Parks, George Maharis, Robert Walker Jr., Martha Hyer, and Faye Dunaway. It tells the story of four hippies who kidnap a retired Mafia mob boss, holding him for ransom.

== Plot ==
Four bored beach bums from Miami come across kids playing with toy guns. They chase one of them into a house, which, by chance, belongs to one Roc Delmonico, a former gangster who is now retired from organized crime and has become a respectable businessman.

Delmonico assumes it to be a kidnapping and volunteers to go quietly. The hippies like the idea, particularly their leader, Taurus, a gigolo who lives off rich ladies. He and his accomplices, Sureshot, Herby, and Sandy, drive off with Delmonico in the trunk of their car. They hide out and demand a ransom of $200,000.

No one, unfortunately, will pay the ransom—not Delmonico's unhappy wife Monica or his business partner Fred or even Sam, his old mob boss. The frustrated crooks decide that it is hopeless, but Delmonico is so offended that he personally takes charge of his own kidnapping. He raises the demand to $3 million, vowing to reveal secrets that will ruin Monica, Fred, and Sam.

The money is paid, whereupon the greedy Taurus suggests to Delmonico that they kill the others, leaving a two-way split. However, Delmonico knows not only that the boy cannot be trusted, but also that the bank has marked the bills from the ransom and that the police will trace them. Delmonico sets fire to the money and walks away. When asked what he will do now, Delmonico responds, without looking back, "Who knows?"

== Cast ==
- Anthony Quinn as Delmonico
- George Maharis as Taurus
- Michael Parks as Sureshot
- Robert Walker Jr. as Herby
- Martha Hyer as Monica
- Faye Dunaway as Sandy
- Jack Kruschen as the Inspector
- Oscar Homolka as Sam
- Milton Berle as Fred

== Soundtrack ==
Only a minor success as a film, The Happening is most notable today both as one of Faye Dunaway's earliest films and for its self-titled theme song. Recorded by The Supremes, "The Happening" became a number-one hit on the Billboard Hot 100 when released as a single on the Motown label.

Another music piece, "The Fuzz", was used by several local area TV news programs in the United States and Canada and also used in Televisa's 24 Horas in the late 1960s and early 1970s, and a rearrangement of the same composition is still used by Brazil's Rede Globo national newscast Jornal Nacional.

== Reception ==
Bosley Crowther, in a review for The New York Times, wrote "Granted, one might expect a film called The Happening to appear intentionally superficial, spontaneous and unrehearsed. That still would not provide enough forbearance to prepare one for the sloppiness and bad taste of the picture bearing that title," and that it "truly looks as though this clutter of cheap plot and slapdash camera style […] has been recklessly thrown together by the young director, Elliot Silverstein, during or after a trip—and I mean trip—with a bunch of those kids who assemble periodically at Fort Lauderdale. It is that loose and uncoordinated, erratic and lacking in form." He also cricized the acting, emphasizing the young main cast (particularly singling out Faye Dunaway as a "a carbon copy" of Jane Fonda, who the review points out starred in Silverstein's previous film Cat Ballou), Anthony Quinn, whom Crowther says "can't seem to get out of his system the old infection of Zorba the Greek complicated by Barabbas. That's no good for this sort of beach-boy junk," while adding that "Martha Hyer, Milton Berle and Oscar Homolka are also shamefully bogged down in it. Sam Spiegel, who admits to being the presenter of it, should go off someplace and hang his head." Crowther ultimately concludes that "it isn't as long as Lawrence of Arabia, and that's the only good thing to be said for it."

== See also ==
- List of American films of 1967
