= Saturday Night Live season 2 =

Season of television series

Saturday Night Live
- Season 2
- Starring: Dan Aykroyd; John Belushi; Chevy Chase; Jane Curtin; Garrett Morris; Bill Murray; Laraine Newman; Gilda Radner
- No. of episodes: 22

Release
- Original network: NBC
- Original release: September 18, 1976 – May 21, 1977

Season chronology
- ← Previous season 1 Next → season 3

The second season of Saturday Night Live, an American sketch comedy series, originally aired in the United States on NBC from September 18, 1976 to May 21, 1977.

== History ==
Following the cancellation of ABC's Saturday Night Live with Howard Cosell, NBC changed the name of the show from NBC's Saturday Night to NBC's Saturday Night Live, for the 17th episode of this second season – the episode hosted by Jack Burns on March 26, 1977. The name was changed back to NBC's Saturday Night on the season's 18th episode, hosted by Julian Bond, on April 9, 1977 and would not return to Saturday Night Live until the third season.

The shows on October 16, October 23, and October 30 1976 were live from NBC's studio complex in Brooklyn, NY. NBC News used Studio 8-H for Presidential election coverage.

The first show of this season was the last to feature The Muppets in The Land of Gorch, who had appeared in segments that were unpopular with fans and the SNL writers. Jim Henson was reportedly displeased with the amount of creative control he had over the scripts. Jerry Juhl said that Henson was "very frustrated" with his input into the scripts, and recalled that the SNL writers "didn't have any real handle" on Henson's concept. "Jim would come in with ideas, and sit with them, and give them wonderful ideas, and they wouldn't know how to fly with them," Juhl recalled. In a 1977 interview with Playboy, head writer/performer Michael O'Donoghue referred to the Muppets as "fucking Muppets ... little hairy facecloths" made from the refuse after they cleaned up after Woodstock. He also refused to write for them, saying "I don't write for felt". O'Donoghue also had a lynched Big Bird hanging in his office.

Jim Downey joined the writing staff in what would be a long career on the show.

Buck Henry, Eric Idle and Steve Martin each hosted two episodes.

The season included a Live from Mardi Gras Special.

== Cast ==
During the prior season, cast members George Coe and Michael O'Donoghue had already left the cast, but O'Donoghue stayed on as the show's head writer. Meanwhile, during the season Chevy Chase left the show following an injury, he returned for Weekend Update in a wheelchair for three episodes before leaving permanently. Jane Curtin took over as Weekend Update anchor. Bill Murray was hired as a replacement for Chevy Chase.

=== Cast roster ===
The Not Ready for Prime Time Players

- Dan Aykroyd
- John Belushi
- **Chevy Chase** (final episode: October 30, 1976)
- **Jane Curtin**
- Garrett Morris
- Bill Murray (first episode: January 15, 1977)
- Laraine Newman
- Gilda Radner

bold denotes Weekend Update anchor

== Writers ==
Jim Downey joined the writing staff, with the Ralph Nader episode.

This season's writers included Dan Aykroyd, Anne Beatts, John Belushi, Chevy Chase, Tom Davis, Jim Downey, Al Franken, Bruce McCall, Lorne Michaels, Marilyn Suzanne Miller, Bill Murray, Michael O'Donoghue, Herb Sargent, Tom Schiller, Rosie Shuster and Alan Zweibel.

== Episodes ==
No. overall	No. in season	Host	Musical guest(s)	Original release date
25	1	Lily Tomlin	James Taylor	September 18, 1976
James Taylor performs "Shower the People" (with backing vocals played from a reel to reel tape recorder), a cover of "(I'm a) Road Runner" (with saxophonist David Sanborn), and "Sweet Baby James".; The episode marks the final appearance of the characters from "The Land of Gorch". In this appearance, King Ploobis, Queen Peuta, Scred and Wisss wake up in a filing cabinet assuming that they are in the afterlife. When they think that their sketch has been revived, they find The Mighty Favog under a dust cover that King Ploobis removes. The Mighty Favog states that this may be their last chance on the show and that they must do whatever they tell them to do. "The Land of Gorch" Muppets are then visited by Lily Tomlin. When Lily states that she heard about The Muppet Show that came out last week, Wisss states that they won't let them be on their show since it's a family show. Lily and "The Land of Gorch" Muppets try to sing "I Whistle a Happy Tune". Unfortunately, "The Land of Gorch" Muppets can't whistle. Lily Tomlin leaves planning to find something else for her and "The Land of Gorch" Muppets to do.; Taylor Mead makes a filmed cameo appearance in Gary Weis' piece.; The show ends with Paul Shaffer and Lily Tomlin performing the Antler Dance as the entire cast, crew, the characters from "The Land of Gorch", and the audience join in.; Contains the "Ford-Carter Debate" sketch.
26	2	Norman Lear	Boz Scaggs	September 25, 1976
Boz Scaggs performs "Lowdown" and "What Can I Say", both from the Silk Degrees album.; In his monologue, Norman Lear mock interviews a series of stars from his various produced shows of the time including Bea Arthur from Maude, Richard Crenna & Bernadette Peters from All's Fair, Carroll O'Connor & Jean Stapleton from All in the Family, Nancy Walker from The Nancy Walker Show and Sherman Hemsley & Isabel Sanford from The Jeffersons. They all speak favorably to his face and grimace and mock him as he turns away. In the end, Bea Arthur has two men come and dump a trashcan of water over his head.; Jane Curtin fills in for Chevy Chase as Weekend Update anchor.; Chevy Chase's voice and photo are used in a cold open in which Gilda Radner uses a telephone receiver to act out Chase's customary show-opening pratfall as the injured Chevy Chase speaks over the line warning her not to attempt such a fall.
27	3	Eric Idle	Joe Cocker & Stuff	October 2, 1976
Joe Cocker performs "You Are So Beautiful" and "Feelin' Alright" with Stuff. Belushi "duets" with Cocker on the latter.; Stuff performs "Foots".; Richard Belzer, the show's warm-up comedian during season 1, makes a cameo appearance during the cold open impersonating the still-injured Chase, who contributes via phone.; There is a recurring joke throughout this episode where Eric Idle tries to sing George Harrison's "Here Comes The Sun" in a gruff, angry voice before getting stopped by various cast members. Harrison himself performed the song with Paul Simon on the show almost 2 months later.; First American television appearance of The Rutles, in response to Lorne Michaels' Beatles offer from the previous season.; Doonesbury creator Garry Trudeau appears in the audience with the caption "Doomed".
28	4	Karen Black	John Prine	October 16, 1976
John Prine performs "Hello in There" and "The Bottomless Lake".; The second appearance of Mr. Bill in response to the show's request for home movies.; This episode was performed in Brooklyn, while Studio 8H was used for election coverage.; Black's then nine month old son, Hunter, makes an appearance in her monologue.
29	5	Steve Martin	Kinky Friedman	October 23, 1976
Contains the "Jeopardy! 1999" sketch.; Kinky Friedman performs "Dear Abbie".; This episode was performed in Brooklyn, while Studio 8H was used for election coverage.; This is the first episode Steve Martin hosts.
30	6	Buck Henry	The Band	October 30, 1976
The Band performs "Life Is a Carnival", "The Night They Drove Old Dixie Down", "Stage Fright" and "Georgia on My Mind".; Buck Henry was cut on his forehead by John Belushi's sword during Samurai Stockbroker sketch. Henry, as well as cast members, continued the show with bandaged heads. During this sketch Henry refers to Belushi's character as "Mr. Mikuraki." Belushi's character is typically cited as "Samurai Futaba."; This episode was performed in Brooklyn, while Studio 8H was used for election coverage.; Chevy Chase's final episode as a cast member.
31	7	Dick Cavett	Ry Cooder	November 13, 1976
Ry Cooder performs "Tattler" and "He'll Have to Go".; Chevy Chase appears as the lead in the filmed sketch “Mobile Shrink”.; Future cast member Ann Risley appears in the "Mobile Shrink" sketch.; This is the first episode where "Live from New York, it's Saturday Night!" was recited by a female cast member.; According to Cavett during his monologue, Elliott Gould was supposed to host this episode but had to cancel for unknown reasons.; Richard Belzer makes an appearance as the grandson in the Bees sketch.
32	8	Paul Simon	Paul Simon & George Harrison	November 20, 1976
Paul Simon sings "Still Crazy After All These Years" in a turkey costume. He also performs "50 Ways to Leave Your Lover", "Bridge over Troubled Water", and "Something So Right".; Paul Simon and George Harrison play George Harrison's "Here Comes the Sun" and Paul Simon's "Homeward Bound". Harrison's appearances were pre-taped.; Promo videos for George Harrison's songs "Crackerbox Palace" and "This Song" air during the show.; Jodie Foster makes an appearance in the audience as the show goes to a commercial.; During the cold open, George Harrison and Lorne Michaels can be seen discussing Lorne Michaels' Beatles offer from the previous season. Harrison says the opening spiel.; Chevy Chase appears in the cold open.; NBC re-aired the episode on October 13, 2018, in honor of Simon's 77th birthday. It was the same night Simon made his record 9th appearance as musical guest on SNL.
33	9	Jodie Foster	Brian Wilson	November 27, 1976
Brian Wilson appears solo, though he's promoting the current Beach Boys release 15 Big Ones. He performs "Back Home", "Love is a Woman", and the Beach Boys' hit, "Good Vibrations". He also appears in the "Metal Detector" sketch as a security guard.; Chevy Chase appears in the Pilson’s Feedbag Dinner commercial.; The fourth wall is broken as Jodie Foster addresses the audience in the Bee sketch.; A running gag throughout the episode involves Gilda's appearances kept to a minimum, as if she was being quietly phased out of the show.
34	10	Candice Bergen	Frank Zappa with Don Pardo as "The Slime"	December 11, 1976
Frank Zappa performs "I'm the Slime" (with Don Pardo), "The Purple Lagoon" (with John Belushi in character as Samurai Futaba who carries out a call and response with Frank Zappa's band), and "Peaches en Regalia". He also appeared in "The Killer Trees" sketch.; First appearance of Irwin Mainway.; During the "Right to Extreme Stupidity" sketch, Candice Bergen slips up and addresses Gilda Radner's character as Fern, which is actually the name of Bergen's character. While Bergen is reduced to spontaneous laughter, Radner responds by inverting the sketch's premise ("We can't all be brainy like Fern here!").; Candice Bergen and the cast perform "Let's Kill Gary Gilmore for Christmas".; The show ends with Candice Bergen ad-libbing a closing and the cast ice skating around Rockefeller Plaza.; Truman Capote was originally set to host this episode but had to bow out due to illness.
35	11	Ralph Nader	George Benson	January 15, 1977
George Benson performs "This Masquerade" and "Gonna Love You More". He also appears in the "Execution Rehearsal" sketch as a priest.; First appearance of the Coneheads.; First appearance of Rhonda Weiss.; Andy Kaufman makes his fifth appearance.; Bill Murray's first episode as a cast member (he replaces an injured John Belushi, who only appears via telephone). Murray is announced during the end credits by Don Pardo as "Joining tonight's cast was Bill Murray".
36	12	Ruth Gordon	Chuck Berry	January 22, 1977
Chuck Berry performs "Johnny B. Goode" and a medley of "Memphis, Tennessee" and "Carol".; Ricky Jay does a solo magic set and appears in the "Little Old Ladies of the Evening" sketch.; O.J. Simpson appears in final audience shot with Dick Butkus and the chryron caption "BROUGHT HERE UNDER GUARD"; Bill Murray is credited during the opening titles with the rest of the cast.
37	13	Fran Tarkenton	Leo Sayer; Donnie Harper	January 29, 1977
Fran Tarkenton becomes the first athlete to host the show.; During the monologue, Tarkenton attempts to sing the song "Feelings" only to be replaced by Garrett Morris.; A running gag throughout this episode involved several sketches being played out like a football game, with John Belushi acting as coach.; Leo Sayer performs "When I Need You" and "You Make Me Feel Like Dancing".; Donnie Harper performs "Sing". Harper becomes the first gospel artist to perform on the show.
38	14	Steve Martin	The Kinks	February 26, 1977
The Kinks performs a medley of "You Really Got Me", "All Day and All of the Night", "A Well Respected Man", and "Lola"; and "Sleepwalker".; Lily Tomlin appears as "special guest".
39	15	Sissy Spacek	Richard Baskin	March 12, 1977
Writers Al Franken and Tom Davis are billed as "special guests" in the opening credits and perform their own segment in the show.; Contains the "Ask President Carter" sketch.; Richard Baskin performs "One I Love You" (as a duet with Spacek) and "City of One-Night Stands".; This episode won an Emmy Award.
40	16	Broderick Crawford	Levon Helm; Dr. John; The Meters	March 19, 1977
Levon Helm and Dr. John performed "Ain't That a Lot of Love". and "Sing Sing Sing," accompanied by Paul Butterfield, as part of the RCO All-Stars.; The Meters performs "My Name up in Lights".; Linda Ronstadt makes a special appearance in the opening sketch as a back-up singer of the "Rondettes".; This episode includes Bill Murray's direct appeal that "I don't think I'm making it on the show."
41	17	Jack Burns	Santana	March 26, 1977
Santana performs "Black Magic Woman/Gypsy Queen" and "Europa".; The first episode to carry the title Saturday Night Live, but only for this week as the show would continue to be called NBC's Saturday Night for the rest of the season.
42	18	Julian Bond	Tom Waits; Brick	April 9, 1977
Tom Waits performs "Eggs and Sausage (In a Cadillac with Susan Michelson)".; Brick performs "Dazz".
43	19	Elliott Gould	McGarrigle Sisters; Roslyn Kind	April 16, 1977
The McGarrigle Sisters performs "Kiss and Say Goodbye" and "Heart Like a Wheel".; Roslyn Kind performs "I'm Not Anyone".; First appearance of Nick The Lounge Singer.
44	20	Eric Idle	Alan Price; Neil Innes	April 23, 1977
Contains the "Frost/Nixon" sketch.; Alan Price performs "In Times Like These" and "Poor People".; Neil Innes performs "Cheese and Onions" (as Nasty) and "Shangri-La".; "Her Majesty Queen Elizabeth" (played by Jeannette Charles) assists in the telethon to "Save Great Britain" at "555-1066", which is a running sketch throughout the show.
45	21	Shelley Duvall	Joan Armatrading	May 14, 1977
Joan Armatrading performs "Love and Affection" and "Down to Zero".; Lorne Michaels appears in the opening sketch, with Shelley Duvall and John Belushi in Bee costumes.; The opening montage is only shown on a backstage TV, as the camera follows Shelley Duvall, Jane Curtin, Laraine Newman and Gilda Radner onto the stage to sing as the "Video Vixens."; Chevy Chase appears in the audience during one of the commercial bumpers, with the caption "USED TO BE ON THE SHOW."; Spalding Gray narrates and appears in the video "Brides".
46	22	Buck Henry	Jennifer Warnes; Kenny Vance	May 21, 1977
Jennifer Warnes performs "Right Time of the Night".; Kenny Vance performs "The Performer".; Michael O'Donoghue is credited as a special guest as "impressionist Michael O'Donoghue" in the opening credits. He performs his impressions of celebrities having steel needles driven into their eyes.; Bella Abzug is interviewed by Emily Litella during Weekend Update.; Home video by William Wegman.; Final episode where Dan Aykroyd has a moustache.; Last episode to be called NBC's Saturday Night.; Chevy Chase makes a cameo appearance as the Landshark in a sketch about Charles Lindbergh.; Final episode with the original Weekend Update set.

== Special ==
Title	Original release date
"Live from Mardi Gras"	February 20, 1977
The cast and crew participate in the annual Mardi Gras festivities in New Orleans. Jane Curtin and Buck Henry try to provide commentary on the parade. Eric Idle, Penny Marshall and Henry Winkler cameo in the special. Randy Newman performed "Louisiana 1927", "Marie", "Kingfish", and "Sail Away". Michael O'Donoghue leads the crowd in an encore of the Antler Dance.

== Home media ==
The Mardi Gras Special and all 22 episodes were released on a DVD set on December 4, 2007.
