= Saturday Night Live season 1 =

Season of television series

Saturday Night Live
- Season 1
- Starring: Dan Aykroyd; John Belushi; Chevy Chase; George Coe; Jane Curtin; Garrett Morris; Laraine Newman; Michael O'Donoghue; Gilda Radner
- No. of episodes: 24

Release
- Original network: NBC
- Original release: October 11, 1975 – July 31, 1976

Season chronology
- Next → season 2

The first season of Saturday Night Live (then known as NBC's Saturday Night to avoid confusion with the similarly named variety show hosted by Howard Cosell), an American sketch comedy series, originally aired in the United States on NBC from October 11, 1975, to July 31, 1976. The show served as a vehicle that launched to stardom the careers of a number of major comedians and actors, including Gilda Radner, Chevy Chase, John Belushi, and Dan Aykroyd.

== History ==
In 1974, NBC Tonight Show host Johnny Carson asked that the weekend broadcasts of "Best of Carson" (officially known as The Weekend Tonight Show Starring Johnny Carson) come to an end (The Tonight Show was a 90-minute program at the time), so he could take two weeknights off; NBC would thus air those repeats on those nights rather than feed them to affiliates for broadcast on either Saturdays or Sundays. Given Carson's undisputed status as the king of late-night television, NBC heard his request as an ultimatum, fearing he might use the issue as grounds to defect to either ABC or CBS. To fill the gap, the network drew up some ideas and brought in Dick Ebersol – a protégé of legendary ABC Sports president Roone Arledge – to develop a 90-minute late-night variety show. Ebersol's first order of business was hiring a young Canadian producer named Lorne Michaels to be the show-runner.

Television production in New York was already in decline in the mid-1970s (The Tonight Show had departed for Los Angeles two years prior), so NBC decided to base the show at their studios in Rockefeller Center to offset the overhead of maintaining those facilities. Michaels was given Studio 8H, a converted radio studio that prior to that point was most famous for having hosted Arturo Toscanini and the NBC Symphony Orchestra from 1937 to 1951, but was being used largely for network election coverage by the mid-1970s.

When the first show aired on October 11, 1975, with George Carlin as its host, it was called NBC's Saturday Night because ABC featured a program at the same time titled Saturday Night Live with Howard Cosell. After ABC cancelled the Cosell program in 1976, the NBC program changed its name to Saturday Night Live, starting with the 17th episode of the second season – the episode hosted by Jack Burns on March 26, 1977 (and subsequently picked up Bill Murray from Cosell's show in 1977, as well). Starting from the first episode, Don Pardo introduced the cast, a job he would hold (with the exception of Season 7) for 38 years, concluding with his death in 2014.

The original concept was for a comedy-variety show featuring young comedians, live musical performances, short films by Albert Brooks and segments by Jim Henson featuring atypically adult and abstract characters from The Muppets world. Rather than have one permanent host, Michaels elected to have a different guest host each week. The first episode featured two musical guests (Billy Preston and Janis Ian), and the second episode, hosted by Paul Simon on October 18, was almost entirely a musical variety show with various acts. The Not Ready for Prime Time Players did not appear in this episode at all, other than as the bees with Paul Simon telling them they were cancelled, and Chevy Chase in the opening and in "Weekend Update". Over the course of Season 1, sketch comedy would begin to dominate the show and SNL would more closely resemble its current format.

Andy Kaufman made several appearances over the season that were popular with the audience, while the extremely unpopular Muppet's Land of Gorch bits were essentially cancelled after episode 10, although the associated Muppet characters still made sporadic appearances after that. After one final appearance at the start of season two, the Muppet characters were permanently dropped from SNL.

During the season, Michaels appeared on-camera four times, the first being on January 10, when during Elliot Gould's monologue in "The Killer Bees" sketch, the camera appears to malfunction and Michaels is introduced as a co-producer. On February 28, Michaels appeared during the cold open of a Jill Clayburgh hosted episode where he tries to persuade Chase to keep opening the show with a fall. On April 24 and May 22, he makes an offer to The Beatles to reunite on the show. In the first appearance, he offered a certified check of $3000. In the second appearance, he increased his offer to $3200 and free hotel accommodations. John Lennon and Paul McCartney later both admitted they had been watching SNL from Lennon's apartment on May 8 (the episode after Michaels' first offer) and briefly toyed with actually going down to the studio, but decided to stay in the apartment because they were too tired.

== Cast ==
=== Changes and notes ===
The first cast member hired was Gilda Radner. The rest of the cast included fellow Second City alumni Dan Aykroyd and John Belushi, as well as National Lampoon "Lemmings" alumnus Chevy Chase (whose trademark became his usual falls and opening spiel that cued the show's opening) who was chosen as anchor for Weekend Update, Jane Curtin, Garrett Morris, and Groundlings alumna Laraine Newman. Writer Michael O'Donoghue, a writer at National Lampoon, had worked alongside several cast members while directing The National Lampoon Radio Hour. The original theme music was written by future Academy Award–winning composer Howard Shore, who – along with his band (occasionally billed as the "All Nurse Band" or "Band of Angels") – was the original band leader on the show. Paul Shaffer, who would go on to lead David Letterman's band on Late Night and then The Late Show, was also band leader in the early years.

Much of the talent pool involved in the inaugural season was recruited from the National Lampoon Radio Hour, a nationally syndicated comedy series that often satirized current events.

This would be the only season for George Coe and Michael O'Donoghue as official cast members. While Coe was billed only in the premiere, he was seen in various small roles through the season before leaving the show altogether. O'Donoghue was credited for the first, third, and fourth episodes and would continue to work for the show as a writer, as well as an occasional guest performer (particularly as "Mr. Mike"), through season 5.

=== Cast roster ===
The Not Ready for Prime Time Players

- Dan Aykroyd
- John Belushi
- Chevy Chase (also Weekend Update anchor)
- George Coe (only credited episode: October 11, 1975)
- Jane Curtin
- Garrett Morris
- Laraine Newman
- Michael O'Donoghue (final episode: November 8, 1975)
- Gilda Radner

== Writers ==
The original writing staff included Anne Beatts, Chevy Chase, Tom Davis, Al Franken, Lorne Michaels, Marilyn Suzanne Miller, Michael O'Donoghue, Herb Sargent, Tom Schiller, Rosie Shuster and Alan Zweibel. Michaels did not designate a head writer in the early years, despite Chase and O'Donoghue claiming that they were head writers, according to various SNL books.

== Episodes ==
No. overall	No. in season	Host	Musical guest(s)	Original release date
1	1	George Carlin	Janis Ian & Billy Preston	October 11, 1975
Billy Preston performs "Nothing from Nothing" and "Fancy Lady". Janis Ian performs "At Seventeen" and "In the Winter".; The cold open features John Belushi as a foreign man learning English being taught by writer Michael O'Donoghue. Following this sketch, Chevy Chase appeared with a headset on and bellows the first "Live from New York, It's Saturday Night!"; During the opening credits, announcer Don Pardo misspeaks and calls the Not Ready for Primetime Players "the Not for Ready Primetime Players".; As host, George Carlin performs stand-up, introduced the musical guests and conducted the goodnight segment. Carlin performed three monologues, including "Baseball-Football". According to the book Live from New York, Carlin did not participate in any sketches because he was completely stoned. (According to Laraine Newman, however, during an interview with the Archive of American Television, Carlin was set to appear in a sketch about Alexander the Great's high school reunion but it was cut at the last minute, after dress rehearsal.); Andy Kaufman appears in a segment consisting of him playing the Mighty Mouse theme on a record player, standing silent during the verses of the song and miming along with the choruses.; Valri Bromfield makes a guest appearance. Jacqueline Carlin appeared as the mother in the "New Dad Insurance" sketch and as the woman with a book in the "Academy of Better Careers" sketch. Wendy Craig appeared as the salesman in the "Academy of Better Careers" sketch. Richard Belzer (the show's warm-up comedian), writer Tom Davis and talent coordinator Neil Levy appear as jurors in the "Courtroom" sketch.; Sketches include the Bees; the Albert Brooks film, "The Impossible Truth"; "Trojan Horse Home Security"; "Triple-Trac"; and The Land of Gorch, with Jim Henson, Frank Oz, Jerry Nelson, Rhonda Hansome, and Alice Tweedy.; Paul Simon appears to promote his appearance as host the following week.; Dan Aykroyd, John Belushi, Chevy Chase, Jane Curtin, Garrett Morris, Laraine Newman, Michael O'Donoghue, and Gilda Radner's first episode as cast members; George Coe's only episode as a cast member.; The sketches in this episode are very short with each lasting an average of 2 minutes.
2	2	Paul Simon	Randy Newman, Phoebe Snow, Art Garfunkel & Jessy Dixon Singers	October 18, 1975
Michael O'Donoghue is not listed in the cast in the opening credits for this episode.; Paul Simon and Art Garfunkel perform "The Boxer," "Scarborough Fair" and "My Little Town". Simon also performs "Still Crazy After All These Years", "Marie" "American Tune" solo, "Loves Me Like a Rock" with the Jessy Dixon Singers and "Gone at Last" with Phoebe Snow and the Jessy Dixon Singers. Garfunkel performs "I Only Have Eyes for You". Simon's "Me and Julio Down by the Schoolyard" is heard on Weekend Update during the one-on-one game between Hawkins and Simon.; Randy Newman performs "Sail Away". Snow performs "No Regrets".; The episode features an Albert Brooks film about failed Candid Camera stunts and home movies.; Since this was a music-heavy show, the Not Ready for Primetime Players appeared only once as the Bees when Simon informs them their sketch has been cut. Chevy Chase appears at the end of Simon's performance of "Still Crazy ..." to say "Live from New York ..." and also appears to anchor Weekend Update.; First episode to feature Chase doing a pratfall.; Connie Hawkins and Marv Albert appear on Weekend Update. Jerry Rubin appeared in the "Up Against the Wallpaper" sketch. Bill Bradley appeared in the goodnights.; Not counting the Hawkins-Albert segment, this episode includes the shortest Weekend Update ever at 100 seconds.
3	3	Rob Reiner	none	October 25, 1975
In lieu of a musical guest, John Belushi performs "With a Little Help from My Friends" while impersonating Joe Cocker.; Jim Henson, Richard Hunt, Frank Oz, Jerry Nelson and Alice Tweedy perform in a "Land of Gorch" sketch.; Future cast member Denny Dillon appeared as a special guest with Mark Hampton in a sketch as nuns running a parish talent show. Jacqueline Carlin appeared as a swimmer in the "Golden Needles" sketch. Tom Schiller appeared as the priest in the "Wrigley's Gum" sketch and as one of the Bees. Penny Marshall appeared in the "Fashion Show," "Hoe-Down," and "the Bees" sketches. The Lockers and comedian Andy Kaufman make guest appearances.; George Coe appears in the "Golden Needles" sketch.; First appearance of the "News for the Hard of Hearing".; The episode features an Albert Brooks film about heart surgery.; This episode initially ended without goodnights or credits. Future airings of this episode would add credits over the photo montage seen during the title sequence.
4	4	Candice Bergen	Esther Phillips	November 8, 1975
Esther Phillips performs "What a Diff'rence a Day Made" and "I Can Stand a Little Rain".; Andy Kaufman debuts his Foreign Man character on the show.; Andrew Duncan and Jacqueline Carlin make cameo appearances.; The episode features an Albert Brooks film, "Upcoming Season".; Sketches include "Landshark" and "The Land of Gorch" featuring Jim Henson, Jerry Nelson and Frank Oz performing their characters. This was the first appearance of the Land Shark character.; A live commercial for Polaroid with Candice Bergen and Chevy Chase airs during the show.; Chevy Chase impersonates President Gerald Ford.; Only Garrett Morris, Laraine Newman, Michael O'Donoghue and Gilda Radner were credited for this episode due to a malfunction in the control room.; First episode in which the cast appears with the host during the goodnights.; The "Good Evening, I'm Chevy Chase and you're not" greeting debuts on Weekend Update.; Michael O'Donoghue's final episode as a cast member.
5	5	Robert Klein	ABBA & Loudon Wainwright III	November 15, 1975
ABBA performs "SOS" and "Waterloo". For both of their performances, ABBA lip-synced to a prerecorded track. In a joke subtitle, it is explained this is because their "tapes didn't arrive from Sweden".; Loudon Wainwright III performs "Bicentennial" and "Unrequited to the Nth Degree".; Robert Klein performs "I Can't Stop My Leg" with the Saturday Night Live Band, co-written with Paul Shaffer and Howard Shore.; Chevy Chase impersonates rock star Gregg Allman with Lorne Michaels (in his first appearance on the show, albeit in voice over) asking about Allman's love life.; George Coe makes a guest appearance.; Jim Henson, Richard Hunt, Jerry Nelson, Frank Oz, Alice Tweedy, and Fran Brill perform in a "Land of Gorch" sketch.; Laraine Newman debuts her character Sherry.; First appearance of Emily Litella.
6	6	Lily Tomlin	Tomlin with Howard Shore & the All Nurse Band	November 22, 1975
Lily Tomlin performs "St. James Infirmary Blues," "Bee Bop" and "I Got You Babe" with Scred and The Muppets.
7	7	Richard Pryor	Gil Scott-Heron	December 13, 1975
Gil Scott-Heron performs "Johannesburg" and "A Lovely Day".; Thalmus Rasulala appeared as one of the priests in the "Exorcist II" sketch. Annazette Chase appears as Polly in the "Black & White" sketch. At Richard Pryor's insistence, his ex-wife Shelley and Kathrine McKee, his then-current girlfriend make cameo appearances.; Sketches include "Samurai Futaba," "The Land of Gorch" and an Albert Brooks's film, "sick". This was the first appearance of John Belushi's Samurai character.; The episode introduces the recurring catchphrase "Generalissimo Francisco Franco is still dead" during Weekend Update.; At Pryor's insistence Paul Mooney was hired as a writer Mooney wrote some of Pryor's routines, including the "Racist Word Association Interview".; The show was broadcast on a seven-second delay.; First episode in which someone other than Chase says, "Live from New York ...", in this case, Garrett Morris says it, since Pryor is the first African-American to host.
8	8	Candice Bergen	Martha Reeves & The Stylistics	December 20, 1975
Martha Reeves performs "(Your Love Keeps Lifting Me) Higher and Higher" and "Silver Bells". The Stylistics performed the song "You Make Me Feel Brand New".; Candice Bergen appears in "The Land of Gorch" sketch where she attends King Ploobis' Christmas party while the guests that he had invited are attending the Killer Bees' Christmas party. Bergen performs the song "Winter Wonderland" with the cast.; A live commercial for Polaroid, featuring Candice Bergen and John Belushi airs during the show.; Contains the Mel's Char Palace sketch.; Maggie Kuhn makes a cameo appearance.; The Weekend Update set is slightly modified. In previous episodes, the backdrop had been painted flat gray now it was textured, albeit still gray.; With this episode, Bergen becomes the first person to host the show more than once.; Bergen and Don Pardo invite amateur filmmakers to send in their home movies to be seen later on the show.
9	9	Elliott Gould	Anne Murray	January 10, 1976
Anne Murray performs the songs "The Call" and "Blue Finger Lou".; The episode features an Albert Brooks film, Audience Test Screenings. Other sketches include "Interior Demolitionists" and a Shimmer commercial parody.; Paula Kahn makes a cameo appearance. Jim Henson, Jerry Nelson, Frank Oz and Alice Tweedy perform their characters in "The Land of Gorch".; The episode was submitted for the Emmy Award consideration and won SNL its first Emmy in 1977.; Lorne Michaels and director Dave Wilson appear on camera for the first time in the series during a "Killer Bees" sketch gone wrong. At the end of the episode, Wilson's name is jokingly crossed off in the credits after he gets "fired" by Michaels.; A running gag throughout the episode involves Elliot and Gilda flirting between sketches, culminating in the two "marrying" at the end of the episode.
10	10	Buck Henry	Bill Withers & Toni Basil	January 17, 1976
Bill Withers performs "Ain't No Sunshine".; Toni Basil performs "Wham".; Jerry Nelson and Alice Tweedy perform their characters in "The Land of Gorch".; The Blues Brothers, (in their first appearance) in the Bees costumes, perform "I'm a King Bee" with Howard Shore and His All-Bee Band.; Head writer Michael O'Donoghue is credited as a special guest as "impressionist Michael O'Donoghue" in the opening credits. He performs his impressions of celebrities having steel needles driven into their eyes.; The episode features a Saturday Night Live Samurai sketch, "Samurai Delicatessen". Buck Henry premieres his recurring character, Mr. Dantley.; Writer Alan Zweibel makes a cameo appearance during Weekend Update.; This episode re-aired on January 18th, 2020, as a tribute to Henry, who had died 10 days earlier on January 8th.
11	11	Peter Cook & Dudley Moore	Neil Sedaka	January 24, 1976
Neil Sedaka performs "Breaking Up Is Hard to Do" and "Lonely Night".; Scred from "The Land of Gorch" appeared in a bee costume hoping to play Aunt Bee in a Bees version of The Andy Griffith Show (to loud groans from the audience), only to be told by Gilda Radner that the sketch was canceled. Scred joins Gilda in introducing Neil Sedaka.; This opening montage is the first in which announcer Don Pardo reads aloud the names of the "Not Ready for Primetime Players".; Cook and Moore perform the sketches "One Leg Too Few", "The Frog and Peach" and "Gospel Truth" from their Broadway show Good Evening.; The episode features the sketch, "Lifer Follies," auditions in a prison warden's office for an upcoming inmate talent show, which includes Garrett Morris' "Shotgun" song.; George Coe appears in the cold open and plays the warden in the "Lifer Follies" sketch.
12	12	Dick Cavett	Jimmy Cliff	January 31, 1976
Jimmy Cliff performs "The Harder They Come," "Many Rivers to Cross" and "Wahjahka Man".; Humorist Marshall Efron and Al Alen Petersen make cameo appearances.; At the end of the third "Lowell Brock" sketch, Lorne Michaels can be seen playing a prank on John Belushi tying his shoelaces together. When Belushi realizes the prank, over the applause, he is barely heard muttering, "What the fuck? Goddamn!"; The first viewer-submitted home movie is shown.
13	13	Peter Boyle	Al Jarreau	February 14, 1976
Al Jarreau performs "We Got By" and "Pretty as a Picture".; The Shapiro Sisters dance and lip-sync to the song "This Will Be". One of the sisters, Jenny, also appeared in the "Samurai Divorce Court" sketch.; Steven Spielberg makes an appearance in the audience while Peter Boyle sings a love song to his "wife".
14	14	Desi Arnaz	Desi Arnaz & Desi Arnaz Jr.	February 21, 1976
Desi Arnaz and his son perform "Cuban Pete" and "Babalu".; Gary Weis introduces his short film featuring Taylor Mead and his cat.; The show ends with Arnaz leading the cast, crew and audience in a conga line.
15	15	Jill Clayburgh	Leon Redbone & The Idlers	February 28, 1976
Leon Redbone performs "Ain't Misbehavin'" and "Big Time Woman".; A cappella group The Idlers and comedian Andy Kaufman make cameo appearances. Host Jill Clayburgh appeared with these guests.; Photographer and video artist William Wegman appeared with his dog in Gary Weis' filmed piece.; Lorne Michaels appears during the cold open.; The first appearance of Mister Bill, in a viewer-submitted home movie.; Chevy Chase acts out that week's Land of Gorch sketch, as the Muppets were attending the Grammys. This would mark the final time that the Land of Gorch set is seen on camera.
16	16	Anthony Perkins	Betty Carter	March 13, 1976
Betty Carter performs "Music Maestro, Please/Swing Brother Swing" and "I Can't Help It".; King Ploobis and Scred from "The Land of Gorch" approach Anthony Perkins for help to get their sketch back on the air.; Chuck Scarborough and George Plimpton appear in the studio audience.; Starting with this episode, while the show is still NBC's Saturday Night only Saturday Night appears on the opening credits. Also, pictures of the cast members are shown in the credits as they are named.
17	17	Ron Nessen	Patti Smith	April 17, 1976
Patti Smith Group performs "Gloria" and "My Generation".; President Gerald Ford appeared in a filmed segment during the cold opening where he opens the show with "Live from New York, it's Saturday Night!" after Chevy Chase's signature pratfall. He also appeared in filmed segments during the monologue (where he introduces the host) and during Weekend Update (where, following Chevy Chase's signature line "I'm Chevy Chase and you're not", he says "I'm Gerald Ford and you're not").; Contains the Super Bass-O-Matic '76 sketch.; Billy Crystal (billed as Bill Crystal) performs a monologue, eight years before becoming an SNL cast member. Dan Aykroyd impersonates talk show host Tom Snyder.; The episode features a short Gary Weis film on New York garbage men.
18	18	Raquel Welch	Phoebe Snow & John Sebastian	April 24, 1976
Phoebe Snow performs "All Over" and "Two-Fisted Love".; John Sebastian performs "Welcome Back" with John Belushi as Joe Cocker.; Raquel Welch performs "Superstar" with John Belushi as Joe Cocker, as well as "It Ain't Necessarily So".; Lorne Michaels appeared on air, offering the Beatles US$3,000 (equivalent to $16,973.68 in 2025) to perform three songs.; The characters from "The Land of Gorch" face facts that they aren't welcome on the show anymore. This was the only Gorch sketch written by Jim Henson.; First appearance of Gilda Radner as Baba Wawa.; Phoebe Snow becomes the first repeat musical guest.
19	19	Madeline Kahn	Carly Simon	May 8, 1976
Carly Simon performs "Half a Chance/You're So Vain" in a pre-taped segment with Chevy Chase playing cowbell.; Baba Wawa interviews Madeline Kahn as Marlene Dietrich.; Scred and The Mighty Favog cut a deal with Chevy Chase to have Lorne Michaels renew their sketch in exchange that The Mighty Favog gets The Beatles to appear on the show.; Madeline Kahn performs "I Feel Pretty" as the Bride of Frankenstein.
20	20	Dyan Cannon	Leon and Mary Russell	May 15, 1976
The episode begins with Chevy Chase lying down on home base near a folding table and chairs saying the opening spiel only to be informed by director Dave Wilson that he will have to redo the cold open (solo this time, as the other cast members were already changing costumes), because they went on the air a minute early.; Leon and Mary Russell performs "Satisfy You" and "Daylight," the latter of which featured John Belushi as Joe Cocker.
21	21	Buck Henry	Gordon Lightfoot & Garrett Morris	May 22, 1976
Gordon Lightfoot performs "Summertime Dream" and "Spanish Moss". A third song, "Sundown," is interrupted by John Belushi's Samurai.; Head writer Michael O'Donoghue is credited as a special guest as "impressionist Michael O'Donoghue" in the opening credits. He performs his impressions of celebrities having steel needles driven into their eyes.; Lorne Michaels appears during the monologue and offers the Beatles US$3,200 (equivalent to $18,105.26 in 2025) and free hotel accommodations to perform three songs.
22	22	Elliott Gould	Leon Redbone, Harlan Collins & Joyce Everson	May 29, 1976
Leon Redbone performs "Shine On, Harvest Moon" and "Walking Stick". Harlan Collins & Joyce Everson performs "Heaven Only Knows".; Writers Al Franken and Tom Davis perform a comedy bit together, announced by Don Pardo in the opening credits as "new talent Franken and Davis."; Akira Yoshimura and Doris Powell appear in "The Last Voyage of the Starship Enterprise," a sketch written by Michael O'Donoghue, parodying the television series Star Trek. In the sketch, the crew of the Enterprise tries to deal with the show's cancellation.
23	23	Louise Lasser	Preservation Hall Jazz Band	July 24, 1976
Preservation Hall Jazz Band performs "Panama".; In her monologue, Louise Lasser, who had been arrested on a drug charge the week before and was very difficult for the cast and writers to work with that week, pretends to have a bout of stage fright and lock herself in her dressing room. She had actually done the same thing in real life just before the beginning of the show; the cast was dividing her parts among themselves. Her self-indulgent behavior led Lorne Michaels to keep this episode out of syndication.; Michael Sarrazin (who would later host in season 3) makes a filmed cameo appearance.; Jane Curtin, Laraine Newman and Gilda Radner perform "Cathode Ray Tube" as a '60's styled girl group.; Lorne Michaels appears in the "Diner Sketch".
24	24	Kris Kristofferson	Rita Coolidge	July 31, 1976
Rita Coolidge performs "Hula Hoop". Host Kris Kristofferson performed the songs "Help Me Make It Through the Night" and "I've Got a Life of My Own". Together, Kris Kristofferson and Rita Coolidge performed "Eddie the Eunuch".
