= Richard Belzer =

American actor and comedian (1944–2023)

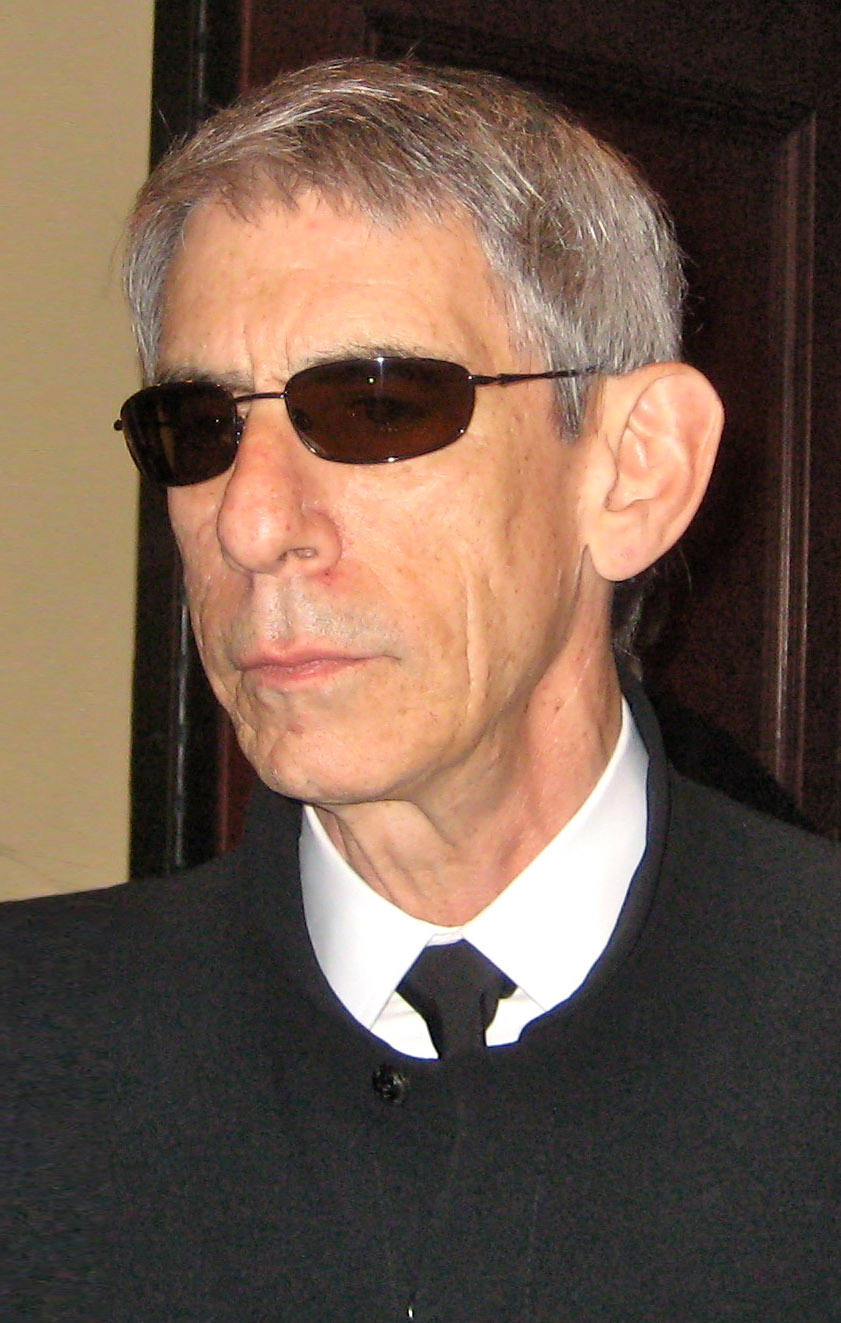
- Belzer at the White House Correspondents Dinner in 2009
- Born: Richard Jay Belzer; August 4, 1944; Bridgeport, Connecticut, U.S.
- Died: February 19, 2023 (aged 78); Bozouls, France
- Occupations: Actor; comedian; author
- Spouses: Gail Susan Ross (m. 1966; div. 1972); Dalia Danoch (m. 1976; div. 1978); Harlee McBride (m. 1985)
- Children: 2
- Relatives: Henry Winkler (cousin)
- Notable work: John Munch on Homicide: Life on the Street and Law & Order: Special Victims Unit

Comedy career
- Years active: 1972–2016
- Medium: Stand-up; film; television; books; radio
- Genres: Observational comedy; political satire; deadpan
- Subjects: American culture; American politics; current events; mass media

Richard Jay Belzer (August 4, 1944 – February 19, 2023) was an American actor, comedian, and author. He was best known for his role as BPD Detective, NYPD Detective/sergeant and investigator John Munch, whom he portrayed for 23 years in the NBC police drama series Homicide: Life on the Street, Law & Order: Special Victims Unit and in several guest appearances on other series.

== Early life and education ==
Belzer was born in Bridgeport, Connecticut, on August 4, 1944, to a Jewish family. He described his mother as frequently physically abusive, and he declared that his comedy career began when trying to make her laugh to distract her from abusing him and his brother. After graduating from Fairfield Warde High School, Belzer worked as a reporter for the Bridgeport Post.

Belzer attended Dean College, which was then known as Dean Junior College, in Franklin, Massachusetts, but was expelled.

== Career ==
=== Stand-up ===
After his first divorce, Belzer relocated to New York City, moved in with singer Shelley Ackerman, and began working as a stand-up comic at Pips, The Improv, and Catch a Rising Star. He participated in the Channel One comedy group that satirized television and became the basis for the cult sketch comedy movie The Groove Tube, in which Belzer played multiple roles.

Belzer was the audience warm-up comedian for Saturday Night Live and made four guest appearances on the show between 1975 and 1980. He also opened for musician Warren Zevon during his tour supporting the release of his album Excitable Boy.

=== Film ===
In the late 1970s and early 1980s, Belzer became an occasional film actor. A short skit of a younger Belzer can be found on Sesame Street in a season 9 episode in 1978 when two young men attempt a picnic and boat ride, only to be thwarted by a dog who eats their food. He is noted for minor roles in Fame, Café Flesh, Night Shift, Scarface, Girl 6, and Fletch Lives. He appeared in the music videos for the Mike + The Mechanics song "Taken In", the Pat Benatar song "Le Bel Age", and the Kansas song "Can't Cry Anymore" all of which were made by Flattery Yukich Inc (Producer Paul Flattery and Director Jim Yukich). He appeared in A Very Brady Sequel as an LAPD detective.

=== Radio ===
In addition to his film career, Belzer was a featured player on the National Lampoon Radio Hour with co-stars John Belushi, Chevy Chase, Bill Murray, Gilda Radner, and Harold Ramis, a half-hour comedy program aired on 600 plus American radio stations from 1973 to 1975. Several of his sketches were released on National Lampoon albums, drawn from the Radio Hour, including several bits in which he portrayed a pithy call-in talk show host named "Dick Ballantine".

In the late 1970s, he co-hosted Brink & Belzer on WNBC radio (660 AM) in New York City. He was a frequent guest on The Howard Stern Show. Following the departure of Randi Rhodes from Air America Radio, Belzer guest-hosted the afternoon program on the network.

Belzer was a regular guest on the right-wing radio show of Alex Jones and appeared on the episode covering the Boston Marathon bombing, in which he referred to the bombing as a false flag event.

=== Television ===
In the 1980s, Belzer was a regular on Alan Thicke's short-lived show Thicke of the Night. He also briefly hosted his own comedy show, titular and popular The Richard Belzer Show on Cinemax, and hosted the Lifetime cable TV talk show, Hot Properties. By the 1990s, he was appearing frequently on television. He was a regular on The Flash as a news anchor and reporter. In several episodes of Lois & Clark: The New Adventures of Superman, he played Inspector William Henderson.

He followed that with starring roles on the Baltimore-based Homicide: Life on the Street (1993–1999) and the New York City-based Law & Order: Special Victims Unit (1999–2013), portraying police detective John Munch in both series. Barry Levinson, Executive Producer of Homicide, said Belzer was a "lousy actor" in audition when he read lines from the script for "Gone for Goode", the first episode in the series. Levinson asked Belzer to take time to reread and practice the material, then read it again. At his second reading, Levinson said Belzer was "still terrible", but that the actor eventually found confidence in his performance.

In addition, Belzer played Munch in episodes on seven other series and in a sketch on one talk show, making Munch the only fictional character to appear on 11 different television shows played by a single actor. These shows were on six different networks:

- Homicide: Life on the Street (NBC)
- Law & Order (NBC)
- The X-Files (Fox)
- The Beat (UPN)
- Law & Order: Trial by Jury (NBC)
  - Belzer's appearance on Trial by Jury, which aired April 15, 2005, made him the third actor ever to play the same character in six different prime-time TV series. The other two actors are John Ratzenberger and George Wendt, who played Cliff Clavin and Norm Peterson, respectively, in Cheers (1982–93), St. Elsewhere (1985), The Tortellis (1987), Wings (1990), The Simpsons (1994), and Frasier (2002).
- Arrested Development (Fox)
- The Wire (HBO)
- 30 Rock (NBC)
  - The characters are watching a Law & Order: Special Victims Unit episode; a scene shot for 30 Rock
- Law & Order: Special Victims Unit (NBC)
- Jimmy Kimmel Live! (ABC)
- Unbreakable Kimmy Schmidt (Netflix), in which he played a John Munch-like character on a fictional Law & Order spin-off.

In March 2016, executive producer Warren Leight announced Belzer would return to reprise the role in a May 2016 episode of Law & Order: Special Victims Unit, titled "Fashionable Crimes".

Belzer portrayed Det. Munch for 22 consecutive seasons on Homicide (7 seasons) and Law & Order: SVU (15 seasons), which exceeded the previous primetime live-action record of twenty consecutive seasons held by James Arness (who portrayed Marshal Matt Dillon on Gunsmoke from 1955 to 1975) and Kelsey Grammer (as Dr. Frasier Crane on Cheers and Frasier from 1984 to 2004). This record has since been passed by Belzer's SVU co-stars Mariska Hargitay and Ice-T.

Belzer appeared in several of Comedy Central's televised broadcasts of Friars' Club roasts. On June 9, 2001, Belzer himself was honored by the New York Friars Club and the Toyota Comedy Festival as the honoree of the first-ever roast open to the public. Comedians and friends on the dais included Roastmaster Paul Shaffer; Christopher Walken; Danny Aiello; Barry Levinson; Robert Klein; Bill Maher; SVU co-stars Mariska Hargitay, Christopher Meloni, Ice-T, and Dann Florek; and Law & Order's Jerry Orbach. At the December 1, 2002, roast of Chevy Chase, Belzer said, "The only time Chevy Chase has a funny bone in his body is when I fuck him in the ass."

Belzer voiced the character of Loogie for most of the South Park episode titled "The Tooth Fairy's Tats 2000". He and Brian Doyle-Murray were featured in the tenth-season premiere of Sesame Street.

=== Author ===
Belzer believed there was a conspiracy to assassinate President John F. Kennedy and wrote five books discussing conspiracy theories:

- UFOs, JFK, and Elvis: Conspiracies You Don't Have to Be Crazy to Believe (2000)
- Dead Wrong: Straight Facts on the Country's Most Controversial Cover-Ups
- Hit List: An In-Depth Investigation into the Mysterious Deaths of Witnesses to the JFK Assassination
- Corporate Conspiracies: How Wall Street Took Over Washington
- Someone Is Hiding Something: What Happened to Malaysia Airlines Flight 370?

Dead Wrong and Hit List were written with journalist David Wayne and reached The New York Times Best Seller list. Someone Is Hiding Something was also written with David Wayne as well as radio talk show host George Noory. Belzer's long-time character, John Munch, was also a believer in conspiracy theories, including the JFK assassination. In 2008, Belzer published a novel, I Am Not a Cop!, about a fictional version of himself investigating a murder.

== Personal life ==
Belzer's first two marriages were to Gail Susan Ross (1966–1972) and boutique manager Dalia Danoch (1976 – c. 1978), both of which ended in divorce. In 1981, in Los Angeles, he met 32-year-old Harlee McBride, a divorcée with two daughters, Bree Benton and Jessica. McBride, who had been seen in Playboy magazine four years earlier in that year's sex-in-cinema feature, in conjunction with Young Lady Chatterley, was appearing in TV commercials for Ford and acting in free theater when she met Belzer at the suggestion of a friend. The two married in 1985 and had a home in Bozouls, France.

Belzer survived testicular cancer in 1983. His 1997 HBO special and comedy CD Another Lone Nut pokes fun at this medical incident, as well as his status as a well-known conspiracy theorist.

On March 27, 1985, four days before the first WrestleMania, Belzer repeatedly requested on his TV talk show Hot Properties that professional wrestler Hulk Hogan demonstrate a wrestling move. Hogan applied a front facelock, which caused Belzer to pass out, and he hit the back of his head on the floor when released. After waking up, Belzer was dazed, lacerated and briefly hospitalized. He later sued Hogan for $5,000,000 and settled out of court for $400,000 in 1990. Belzer refers to the settlement in his 1997 HBO stand-up special Another Lone Nut, revealing it helped him pay for a home in Beaulieu-sur-Mer called the "Chez Hogan" or "Hulk Hogan Estate".

Belzer's father and brother both died by suicide, in 1968 and 2014, respectively. His cousin is actor Henry Winkler.

== Death ==
On February 19, 2023, Belzer died from complications of respiratory disease in Bozouls, France at the age of 78.

Many of Belzer's colleagues paid tribute to him, including Christopher Meloni, Mariska Hargitay, Ice-T, and Dick Wolf.

== Filmography ==
=== Film ===
Year	Film	Role	Notes
1974	The Groove Tube	Rodriguez, Leo Batfish, The President, The Hooker	Independent film
1980	Fame	M.C.	
1982	Café Flesh	Loud-mouthed audience member	
1982	Author! Author!	Seth Shapiro	
1982	Night Shift	Pig	
1983	Scarface	M.C. at Babylon Club	
1983	Likely Stories, Vol. 3	Richard	
1986	America	Gypsy Beam	a.k.a. Moonbeam
1986	Charlie Barnett's Terms of Enrollment	Man Reading Paper	
1987	Flicks	Stoner	Segment: "New Adventures of the Great Galaxy"
1988	The Wrong Guys	Richard 'Belz' Belzer	
1988	Freeway	Dr. David Lazarus	
1989	The Big Picture	Video Show Host	
1989	Fletch Lives	Phil	
1990	The Bonfire of the Vanities	Television Producer	
1991	The Flash II: Revenge of the Trickster	Joe Kline	
1991	Missing Pieces	Baldesari	
1991	Off and Running	Milt Zoloth	
1992	Flash III: Deadly Nightshade	Joe Kline	
1993	Mad Dog and Glory	M.C./Comic	
1993	Dangerous Game	Himself	
1994	North	Barker	
1994	The Puppet Masters	Jarvis	
1995	Not of This Earth	Jeremy Pallin	
1996	Girl 6	Caller #4 – Beach	
1996	A Very Brady Sequel	LAPD Detective	
1996	Get on the Bus	Rick	
1998	The Bar Channel	—N/a	
1998	Species II	U.S. President	
1999	Jump	Jerry	
2006	Copy That	Richard	
2007	BelzerVizion	Himself	Also executive producer
2009	Polish Bar	Hershel	
2010	Santorini Blue	Richard	Also executive producer
2016	The Comedian	Himself	
2017	Gilbert	Himself	Documentary film

=== Television ===
Year	Film	Role	Notes
1975–80	Saturday Night Live	Juror; Chevy Chase; Himself; Museum Visitor	Season 1 episode 1, season 2 episode 3, season 2 episode 27, season 3 episode 61, and season 5 episode 106 (uncredited)
1978	Sesame Street	Man in Row Boat #1	Episode: "(#1186)"
1983–1984	Thicke of the Night	Regular	
1984	The Richard Belzer Show	Himself	Six episodes
1985	Hot Properties	Host	
1985	Moonlighting	Leonard	Episode: "Twas the Episode Before Christmas"
1986	Miami Vice	Captain Hook	Episode: "Trust Fund Pirates"
1989	Tattingers	—N/a	Episode: "Ex-Appeal" a.k.a. Nick & Hillary
1990–91	The Flash	Joe Kline	10 episodes
1991	Monsters	Buzz Hunkle	Episode: "Werewolf of Hollywood"
1992	Human Target	Greene	Episode: "Pilot"
1993–99	Homicide: Life on the Street	Det. John Munch	122 episodes, regular cast
1994	Lois & Clark: The New Adventures of Superman	Inspector William Henderson	Episode: "All Shook Up"; Episode: "Witness"; Episode: "Foundling"; Episode: "The House of Luthor"
1994	Nurses	Jesse Wilner	Episode: "Fly the Friendly Skies"
1994	Bandit Bandit	Big Bob	TV film
1994	Hart to Hart: Crimes of the Hart	Det. Frank Giordano	TV film
1995	Prince for a Day	Bernie Silver	TV film; a.k.a. The Prince and the Pizza Boy
1995	The Invaders	Randy Stein	TV film
1996	Deadly Pursuits	Mariano	TV film
1996–2000	Law & Order	Det. John Munch	Episode: "Charm City"; Episode: "Baby, It's You"; Episode: "Sideshow"; Episode: "Entitled"
1997	The X-Files	Det. John Munch	Episode: "Unusual Suspects"
1997	Richard Belzer: Another Lone Nut	Himself	HBO comedy special
1997	When Cars Attack	Himself	TV film
1997–98	E! True Hollywood Story	Himself	Episode: "Gilda Radner", "John Belushi"
1998	Elmopalooza	Himself	—
1999	Mad About You	Detective Sharp	Episode: "Stealing Burt's Car"
1999–2016	Law & Order: Special Victims Unit	Det./Sgt. John Munch	325 episodes, regular cast
2000	Homicide: The Movie	Det. John Munch	TV film based on the television series
2000	The Beat	Det. John Munch	Episode: "They Say It's Your Birthday"
2000	South Park	Loogie (voice)	Episode: "The Tooth Fairy Tats 2000"
2000	3rd Rock from the Sun	Himself	Episode: "Dick'll Take Manhattan: Part 1"
2005	Law & Order: Trial by Jury	Det. John Munch	Episode: "Skeleton"; This is a crossover sequel to the episode "Tombstone" from season 15 of the series Law & Order.
2006	Arrested Development	Det. John Munch	Episode: "S.O.B.s" (uncredited); Episode: "Exit Strategy"
2008	The Wire	Sgt. John Munch	Episode: "Took"
2009	Jimmy Kimmel Live!	Sgt. John Munch	Episode dated October 7, 2009
2009	Comedy Central Roast of Joan Rivers	Himself	—
2013	America Declassified	Himself	Season 1 episode 1
2013	30 Rock	Himself	Season 7 episode 12
2015	Unbreakable Kimmy Schmidt	A John Munch-like character	One episode: "Kimmy Goes to the Doctor!"

== Books ==
- UFOs, JFK, and Elvis: Conspiracies You Don't Have to Be Crazy to Believe, ISBN 0-345-42918-4
- How to Be a Stand-Up Comic, ISBN 0-394-56239-9
- I Am Not a Cop!: A Novel, ISBN 1-4165-7066-7
- I Am Not a Psychic!, ISBN 1-4165-7089-6
- Dead Wrong: Straight Facts on the Country's Most Controversial Cover-Ups, ISBN 1-6160-8673-4
- Hit List: An In-Depth Investigation into the Mysterious Deaths of Witnesses to the JFK Assassination, ISBN 978-1620878071
- Someone Is Hiding Something: What Happened to Malaysia Airlines Flight 370?, ISBN 978-1632207289
