= George Coe =

American actor (1929–2015)

- Coe in 1980
- Born: George Julian Cohen; May 10, 1929; New York City, New York, U.S.
- Died: July 18, 2015 (aged 86); Santa Monica, California, U.S.
- Occupation: Actor
- Years active: 1957–2015

George Coe (born George Julian Cohen; May 10, 1929 – July 18, 2015) was an American actor.

Coe was a regular actor on stage from the late 1950s, most notably having his big break with the 1963 cabaret show Money, which saw Coe play 22 different roles that ran for a year. He was a part of the original cast for Broadway shows such as What Makes Sammy Run? and Mame, with the latter seeing him do over a thousand performances. He served as a co-director and co-producer in the parody short The Dove, which garnered him an Academy Award nomination. Coe was also a regular in small roles for television since the late 1960s before Coe was cast in the starting cast of the first season of Saturday Night Live in 1975 to balance the relatively young cast. Coe appeared in brief parts for eight episodes of his only season, although he appeared on the show again in 1978 and 1986; he was the oldest freshman actor on the show for nearly four decades.

Coe continued to appear in bit parts for numerous shows and films over the next couple of decades. In his later years, he voiced the character of Woodhouse in Archer.

== Early life ==
Coe was born in New York City, New York. The son of a diamond dealer, he graduated from the Admiral Farragut Academy, before attending Hofstra University in Hempstead. He served in the Navy during the Korean War. After serving in the military, he studied at the American Academy of Dramatic Arts.

== Career ==
Coe started out on Broadway in 1957. He played 22 roles in the Broadway show Money, which was praised by The New York Times.

Coe was an original member of the "Not Ready for Prime Time Players", the original cast of Saturday Night Live. Following his initial stint, he made guest appearances for episodes in 1978 and 1986. At age 46, Coe was the oldest new SNL cast member until 2014, when 47-year-old Leslie Jones joined the cast.

He voiced the Autobot Wheeljack in Michael Bay's Transformers: Dark of the Moon.

He voiced the character of Woodhouse, the much-put-upon valet in the FX animated series Archer; "Auflösung" (Season 8, Episode 8) was dedicated in his memory.

== Death ==
Coe died on July 18, 2015, at the age of 86, after a long illness, in Santa Monica, California. He had a number of illnesses, including lymphoma, a condition he had for around 20 years. He was survived by his wife, two daughters, and four grandchildren.

== Acting credits ==
=== Film ===
Year	Title	Role	Notes
1968	De Düva: The Dove	Viktor	Short Film / also Director / Producer
1975	Distance	Unknown	Producer
1975	The Stepford Wives	Claude Axhelm	
1979	French Postcards	Mr. Weber	
1979	Kramer vs. Kramer	Jim O'Connor	
1980	The First Deadly Sin	Dr. Bernardi	
1981	Bustin' Loose	Dr. Wilson T. Renfrew	
1981	The Amateur	Rutledge	
1982	The Entity	Dr. Weber	
1984	The House of God	Dr. Leggo	
1984	Micki + Maude	Governor Lanford	
1985	Remo Williams: The Adventure Begins	General Scott Watson	
1985	Head Office	Senator Jack Issel Sr.	
1987	Blind Date	Harry Gruen	
1987	Best Seller	Graham	
1989	Cousins	Phil	
1990	The End of Innocence	Dad	
1992	The Mighty Ducks	Judge Weathers	
1995	Gospa	Father Ferdo Vlasic	
1997	Nick and Jane	Mr. Morgan	
1999	The Omega Code	Senator Jack Thompson	
2000	Big Eden	Sam Hart	
2000	A Rumor of Angels	Dr. Sam Jenkins	
2000	Diamond Men	'Tip' Rountree	
2008	Corporate Affairs	George Parker	
2009	Funny People	George's Dad	
2009	Slice of Water	Ben	Short Film
2010	Bathtub Picnic	Ben	Short Film
2011	Transformers: Dark of the Moon	Que / Wheeljack	Voice Role
2011	Wrinkles	Miguel	Voice role (English version)
2013	Chez Upshaw	Reg. Nixon	
2014	13 Sins	Game Host	Voice role Final film role

=== Television ===
Year	Title	Role	Notes
1965	For the People	Reporter	"To Prosecute All Crimes"
1970	Somerset	Leo Kurtz #1	1971–1972
1975	How to Succeed in Business Without Really Trying	Matthews	TV movie
1975–1976	The Doctors	Scott Conrad	series regular (143 episodes)
1975–1978	Saturday Night Live	Himself/Various characters	Season 1; series regular (9 episodes)
1980	Big Blonde	Ed	TV movie
1981	Kent State	Mayor Leroy Satrom	TV movie
1981	Broken Promise	George Mathews	TV movie
1981	Red Flag: The Ultimate Game	Unknown	TV movie
1982	Dreams Don't Die	Sherman	TV movie
1982	Drop-Out Father	Kannon Rush	TV movie
1982	The Country Girl	Phil Cook	TV movie
1983	Goodnight, Beantown	Dick Novak	Series regular (5 episodes)
1983	Hill Street Blues	Benjamin Fisk	3 episodes
1983	Listen to Your Heart	John	TV movie
1983	Rage of Angels	Maguire	TV movie
1983	Sessions	Max	TV movie
1984	He's Not Your Son	Dr. Stadler	TV movie
1984–1985	American Playhouse	Old Man / Brian Haas	2 episodes
1985	My Wicked, Wicked Ways: The Legend of Errol Flynn	Irving Jerome	TV movie
1985	The Insiders	Unknown	"Lonely Hearts"
1985	Remington Steele	'Ace' Ketchum	"Coffee, Tea or Steele"
1985	Moonlighting	Lou LaSalle	"Atlas Belched"
1986	Family Ties	Justin Phillips	"Nothing But a Man"
1986	Blood & Orchids	Dr. Lansing	TV movie
1986	Simon & Simon	Nolan Scott	"The Apple Doesn't Fall Far from the Tree"
1986	The Paper Chase	Unknown	"Honor"
1986	Dallas	Fritz Longley	2 episodes
1986	Scarecrow and Mrs. King	Dr. Quidd	3 episodes
1986–1991	L.A. Law	Judge Wallace R. Vance	8 episodes
1987	Uncle Tom's Cabin	Mr. Shelby	TV movie
1987–1988	Max Headroom	Ben Cheviot	Series regular (14 episodes)
1987–1997	thirtysomething	Ted Murdoch	2 episodes
1988	Magnum, P.I.	William Wainwright	"A Girl Named Sue"
1988	The Golden Girls	Al	"Rose's Big Adventure"
1988	Shootdown	David	TV movie
1988	Why on Earth?	Henry	TV movie
1989	Those She Left Behind	Bill Page	TV movie
1989	My Name Is Bill W.	Frank Shaw	TV movie
1989	The Hollywood Detective	Sid Curley	TV movie
1989	The Tracey Ullman Show	Reverend Graylin	"Jinx Haber Revisited"
1989	Columbo	Dr. Sydney Hammer	"Murder, a Self Portrait"
1989	Matlock	Dr. Lucas Sinclair	"The Buddies"
1990	Amen	Colonel Adams	"The Deacon vs. the U.S. Army"
1990	Father Dowling Mysteries	Mr. Vance	"The Perfect Couple Mystery"
1990	Fine Things	Paul Berman	TV movie
1990	To My Daughter	Frank Parsons	TV movie
1990	Murphy Brown	Theodore	"Bob & Murphy & Ted & Avery"
1990–1992	Murder, She Wrote	Andrew Thayer / Martin Bergman	2 episodes
1991	Star Trek: The Next Generation	Chancellor Durken	"First Contact"
1991	Equal Justice	Colin Baker	4 episodes
1991	Night Court	Peter Collingswood	"Teacher's Pet"
1992	Something to Live for: The Alison Gertz Story	Dr. Feldman	TV movie
1992	Nurses	Rudy	"Rude Awakenings"
1992	Bobby's World	Abe (Voice role)	TV Short "The Music"
1992	The Human Factor	Dr. Astor	"Hear No Evil"
1992	Crossroads	Hugh	"Courtroom Story"
1992	Camp Candy	Unknown (Voice role)	"When It Rains... It Snows"
1993	Law & Order	Lee Hastings	"Conduct Unbecoming"
1993	Joe's Life	Grandpa	"Dear Grandpa"
1995	The Cosby Mysteries	Agent Carter	"Goldilocks"
1995	New York Undercover	Mr. Braddock	"Downtown Girl"
1995	Cagney & Lacey: The View Through the Glass Ceiling	Dan Broadbent	TV movie
1997	Home Improvement	Parker	"Bright Christmas"
1998	Jenny	Thomas Kendall	"A Girl's Gotta Merger"
1998	The Pretender	Dr. Nicholas Haring	"Bloodlines: Part 1"
1998	The Practice	Judge Walters	"Passing Go"
1998	The Nanny	Ernest	"Sara's Parents"
1998–1999	Working	Peter Baines	Series regular (9 episodes)
1999	Any Day Now	Mr. Noonan	"Music from My Life"
1999	Two Guys, a Girl and a Pizza Place	Mr. Belt, Sharon's Boss	"Career Day"
2000	Bull	Ed Krakauer	"To Have and to Hold"
2000	Ladies Man	Herb	2 episodes
2001	The Lone Gunmen	Bertram Byers	"Pilot"
2001	Becker	Mr. Spector	"Really Good Advice"
2001–2002	The West Wing	Senator Howard Stackhouse	2 episodes
2002	Smallville	William Clark	"Redux"
2002	Crossing Jordan	Warren Lauer	"Scared Straight"
2002–2007	Curb Your Enthusiasm	General manager	2 episodes
2003	The Division	Joe Marks	"Oh Mother, Who Art Thou?"
2003	Judging Amy	Judge	"The Best Interests of the Child"
2005	Gilmore Girls	Grandpa Huntzberger	"But I'm a Gilmore!"
2005	Numb3rs	Steve Logan	"Bettor or Worse"
2006	Cold Case	Bill Simmons	"Superstar"
2006–2007	Celebrity Death Match	Albert Einstein / Bud Selig (voice role)	3 episodes
2007	Bones	Father William Donlan	"The Priest in the Churchyard"
2007	The King of Queens	Father Biskup	"Singe Spaced"
2007	Private Practice	Stan	"In Which Addison Has a Very Casual Get Together"
2007	Nip/Tuck	Dr. Joshua Lee	"Dr. Joshua Lee"
2008	Supernatural	Pat Fremont	"No Rest for the Wicked"
2008	Grey's Anatomy	Ed Bullard	"Rise Up"
2009	Star Wars: The Clone Wars	Tee Watt Kaa (voice role)	2 episodes
2009–2019	Archer	Arthur Woodhouse / The Pope (voice role)	Recurring role (22 episodes) "Archer: 1999 — Cubert" (appeared using previously recorded material)
2011–2013	Wilfred	Gene	2 episodes
2012	The Legend of Korra	Toza	"A Leaf in the Wind"
2013	Two and a Half Men	Victor	"My Bodacious Vidalia"

=== Video games ===
Year	Title	Role	Notes
2006	Reservoir Dogs	Unknown	Voice Role
2011	The Elder Scrolls V: Skyrim	Tolfdir / Calcelmo / Calixto Corrium	Voice Role
2011	Star Wars: The Old Republic	Dr. Godera / Grommik Kurthson / Keyo-So	Voice Role
2012	Guild Wars 2	Ghostly Norn Longship Captain / Yakov / Zenik Konsman	Voice Role
2013	Star Wars: The Old Republic – Rise of the Hutt Cartel	Archivist Varus / Kai Teyun / Civilian Hostage	Voice Role

=== Theatre ===
Year	Title	Role	Notes
1964–1965	What Makes Sammy Run?	Julian Blumberg	540 performances
1966–1970	Mame	M. Lindsay Woolsey	1,508 performances
1970–1972	Company	David	705 performances
1978–1979	On the Twentieth Century	Owen O'Malley	449 performances
1986–1987	Into the Woods	The Mysterious Man/Cinderella's Father	50 Performances

== Accolades ==
Year	Association	Category	Nominated work	Results	Ref
1969	Academy Awards	Best Live Action Short Film	De Duva: The Dove	Nominated	
2009	Screen Actors Guild Awards	Ralph Morgan Award	—N/a	Won	
2012	Behind the Voice Actors Awards	Best Vocal Ensemble in a Feature Film	Transformers: Dark of the Moon	Nominated	
2013	Behind the Voice Actors Awards	Best Vocal Ensemble in a Television Series — Comedy/Musical	Archer	Nominated	
2014	Behind the Voice Actors Awards	Best Vocal Ensemble in a Television Series — Comedy/Musical	Archer	Nominated	

== See also ==
- Saturday Night Live season 1
