= Leonard Sillman's New Faces of 1968 =

- Music: June Carroll; Gene Bissell
- Lyrics: June Carroll; Gene Bissell
- Productions: 1968 Broadway

Leonard Sillman's New Faces of 1968 is a 1968 musical revue produced by Leonard Sillman. The original production included Madeline Kahn and Robert Klein.

The play was profiled in the William Goldman book The Season: A Candid Look at Broadway.
