= In the Boom Boom Room =

1973 play by David Rabe

- Original language: English
- Written by: David Rabe
- Genre: Drama
- Setting: Nightclub

Premiere
- Date: November 8, 1973
- Place: Vivian Beaumont Theater

In the Boom Boom Room is a play by David Rabe. The play follows a young go-go dancer who has a difficult relationship with her parents.

== Plot summary ==
Chrissy arrives in 1960s Philadelphia with the dream of becoming a successful dancer. Desperation leads her to a job at a sleazy nightclub called Big Tom's Boom Boom Room. While working at the nightclub, she explores love and sex with a variety of unsuitable partners of both genders and forms a friendship with a gay neighbor. She tries to resolve troubling issues in her life, including her mother who had wanted an abortion and memories of sexual abuse by her father .

== Production history ==
The play was first written and performed, in two acts, at Villanova University in 1972. Rabe was teaching at Villanova and the play's director, Robert Hedley, was chair of the theatre department.

Prior to staging the play at Lincoln Center the following year, Rabe added a scene and several speeches to the first act, expanding it considerably. As a result, the play was divided into three acts, to Rabe's dissatisfaction.

The play opened on Broadway at the Vivian Beaumont Theater on November 8, 1973 and closed on December 9, 1973, after 37 performances and 16 previews. Directed by Joseph Papp, the cast included Madeline Kahn as Chrissy, Robert Loggia as her husband Al, Charles Durning as her father Harold, Charlotte Rae as her mother Helen, and Mary Woronov as a dancer named Susan. The creative team included Santo Loquasto (scenic design), Theoni V. Aldredge (costume design), and Martin Aronstein (lighting design).

The production was nominated for the 1974 Tony Award for Best Play, but lost to Joseph A. Walker's The River Niger. Also nominated for a Tony were Kahn (Best Actress in a Play) and Aronstein (Best Lighting Design, Play or Musical). Kahn won the Drama Desk Award for Outstanding Performance.

Papp then presented the play at The Public Theater in a production directed by Robert Hedley and starring Ellen Greene, Helen Hanft, Christopher Lloyd, Fred Grandy, and Tom Quinn. It opened November 20, 1974 and ran for 31 performances. Baayork Lee choreographed this production. The production was nominated for the New York Drama Critics' Circle Award for Best American Play.

The play was restored to its original two-act structure when it was revived Off-Broadway at the South Street Theater by the Australian Orange Tree Company in 1985. Jerrold Brody directed the production, with Liz McDonald as Chrissy. Reviewing the 1985 production for The New York Times, Herbert Mitgang wrote, "[the play] comes encumbered with a history. But viewed for the first time on its own modest terms on a bandbox stage, it is full of dramatic fury."

The two-act version of the play was published by Grove Press in 1994.

== Awards and nominations ==
=== Original Broadway production ===
Year	Award	Category	Nominee	Result
1974	Tony Award	Best Play		Nominated
1974	Tony Award	Best Actress in a Play	Madeline Kahn	Nominated
1974	Tony Award	Best Lighting Design	Martin Aronstein	Nominated
1974	Drama Desk Award	Outstanding Performance	Madeline Kahn	Won
1974	Theatre World Award		Mary Woronov	Won
