= How to Succeed in Business Without Really Trying =

How to Succeed in Business Without Really Trying may refer to:

- How to Succeed in Business Without Really Trying (book), a 1952 book written by Shepherd Mead and the inspiration for the musical of the same name.
- How to Succeed in Business Without Really Trying (musical), a 1961 musical adapted by Frank Loesser with Abe Burrows, Jack Weinstock, and Willie Gilbert
  - How to Succeed in Business Without Really Trying (original Broadway cast recording), a 1961 album
  - How to Succeed in Business Without Really Trying: Soundtrack from the Musical Comedy, a 2011 album
- How to Succeed in Business Without Really Trying (film), a 1967 film adapted and directed by David Swift
  - How to Succeed in Business Without Really Trying (soundtrack), a 1967 album
