= The Dove (1968 film) =

De Düva (The Dove)
- Directed by: George Coe; Anthony Lover
- Written by: Sidney Davis
- Produced by: George Coe; Sidney Davis; Anthony Lover
- Starring: Pamela Burrell; George Coe; Sid Davis; Madeline Kahn; Stan Rubinstein; Tom Stone; Peter Turgeon; David Zirlin
- Cinematography: Anthony Lover
- Edited by: Anthony Lover
- Distributed by: Schoenfeld Films
- Release date: 1968
- Running time: 15 minutes
- Country: United States
- Language: Fictional (English-based)

The Dove (De Düva (Note: Swedish would be Duvan.)) is a 1968 Oscar-nominated American short film that parodies the films of Swedish director Ingmar Bergman.

== Background ==
The film was directed by George Coe and Anthony Lover. Madeline Kahn made her first film appearance, in a supporting role.

The film borrows heavily from the plot lines of some of Bergman's most famous films. There is a journey by car back to the location of childhood memories as in Wild Strawberries. The main characters meet with the shrouded figure of Death as in The Seventh Seal.

The dialogue and voice-over narration are spoken mostly in a heavily accented fictional language, which is mostly English made to sound like Swedish, with many of the nouns ending in "ska". (For example, the subtitled word "eventually" is spoken in dialogue as "sooner or lateska".) There is also a smattering of Yiddish words.

The film often was shown in repertory film houses as a short feature when Bergman films were on the bill; audiences frequently did not realize that the short was a comedy until individuals started laughing when they began to understand the fake Swedish. The subtitles, which often do not literally match the dialogue, add to the humor.

== Plot ==
Victor, a 76-year-old physics professor traveling by chauffeured car to give a university lecture, decides to visit his boyhood home. In the outhouse, he finds a figurine of a dove that reminds him of a summer picnic from his youth. Later in the flashback, Victor (played by Coe) and his beloved sister Inga run through the woods until they come across Death, who has come to claim Inga. Victor wagers that Death will not win a badmintonska (badminton) competition with Inga—parodying The Seventh Seal, in which the competition is a game of chess. Death agrees, with the condition that if he wins he will take both Inga and Victor. After Inga wins the competition, thanks in whole or in part to the accidental bird droppings of the Dove, she and Victor happily run to the lake to go skinny-dipping.
