= Belzer v. Bollea =

1990 New York Supreme Court case

- Court: New York Supreme Court, New York County
- Citation: 150 Misc. 2d 925 (N.Y. Misc. 1990)

Keywords
- contingent fees

Belzer v. Bollea 150 Misc. 2d 925 (N.Y. Misc. 1990) is a 1990 New York Supreme Court case between television presenter Richard Belzer and professional wrestler Hulk Hogan (whose real name is Terry Bollea). The case involved Belzer suing Hogan for personal injury after Hogan had put a sleeper hold on him, after Belzer had asked him to demonstrate one of his signature moves. The case was eventually settled financially out of court; however, the case continued to be heard for the purposes of additional attorney's compensation requested by Belzer's lawyers, which was denied by the court.

== Background ==
Richard Belzer was a comedian who was the host of Hot Properties on television in 1985. On March 27, 1985, during one episode, he was interviewing Hulk Hogan and Mr. T live for their upcoming World Wrestling Federation WrestleMania I tag team match. Belzer asked Hogan to put him in a wrestling hold. Hogan put Belzer in a front chin lock and applied it, which led to Belzer passing out. As he did so, Belzer slipped from Hogan's grasp and hit his head on the floor. Belzer later awoke to cut to a commercial break, and went to the hospital to have nine stitches in the back of his head where he hit the floor. Following the commercial break, Hogan apologized for injuring Belzer, with Hogan keeping kayfabe and saying "didn't realize that apparently he doesn't do any physical training at all" and warned the audience "if you're not a professional athlete or you're not a professional wrestler, don't try to copy what you see the athletes or professional wrestlers do on TV". Belzer appeared on Hot Properties a week later, and showed the stitches that resulted from the incident. He sued Hogan for $5 million in damages for personal injury.

== Trial ==
The case was due to be heard at the New York Supreme Court. However, Belzer and Hogan reached an out-of-court settlement for an undisclosed amount. Belzer's lawyers said they were entitled to 50% of the settlement instead of the regular 1/3 contingent fee, due to the "angst, aggravation and life's blood" they had spent on the case; the case continued in order to decide this. Despite providing a letter from Belzer praising them for their work and appearing supportive of the application, Belzer stated that he only agreed to that under duress, as he felt emotionally drained by the case and feared if he refused, then it could jeopardize the settlement with Hogan if he hired new lawyers. Belzer stated he did not personally agree with the additional fees, which caused the lawyers to call him "a paradigm of ingratitude".

The judge ruled that under New York Codes, Rules and Regulations, lawyers' compensation could either be based upon a sliding scale of permissible recovery, or on an agreed-upon contingent fee. Belzer had agreed to a retainer agreement for the 1/3 contingent fee prior to the case. The lawyers argued that, as they had spent over 50 hours preparing the case, their services were worth more than the contingent fee. The judge denied this request, stating that that was a risk that the lawyers had voluntarily taken when they signed the initial agreement. The Court issued a judgment in favor of Belzer, and declared that any section of the signed agreement for compensation greater than the 1/3 contingent fee was void, "no matter how sterling the representation may have been".

== Aftermath ==
Following the case, Belzer used the money to buy a home for himself and his wife in Beaulieu-sur-Mer, France, which he named "Chez Hogan". The amount of the settlement was reported to be $400,000. The case would be cited as legal precedent in New York State law relating to attorney's contingent fees.
