= The Land of Gorch =

Recurring Saturday Night Live skit featuring Jim Henson's Muppets

- Scred sings "I Got You Babe" with Lily Tomlin on the episode that aired on November 22, 1975.
- Genre: Comedy
- Created by: Jim Henson
- Starring: Jim Henson; Frank Oz; Fran Brill; Richard Hunt; Jerry Nelson; Alice Tweedie
- Narrated by: Don Pardo (opening narration)
- Country of origin: United States
- Original language: English
- No. of seasons: 1
- No. of episodes: 16

Production
- Executive producer: Lorne Michaels

Original release
- Release: October 11, 1975 – September 18, 1976

The Land of Gorch was a recurring adult puppetry skit that appeared in the first season of the American comedy television program Saturday Night Live, featuring Jim Henson's Muppets. His characters appeared regularly on the late-night comedy television program. Following the popularity of Sesame Street, which relied heavily on the use of Muppets, Henson feared he would become typecast into working on children's television series. His talent agent Bernie Brillstein (who also represented Gilda Radner, Dan Aykroyd, John Belushi, and Lorne Michaels) helped him transition to Saturday Night Live.

The premise of The Land of Gorch featured Muppet characters, who were members of a royal family, in a faraway locale. They behaved boorishly and made frequent references to drug abuse, sexual activity, and consumption of alcohol. Characters included King Ploobis, Queen Peuta, their son Wiss, and servants Scred and Vazh. These characters often consulted their oracle Mighty Favog for advice.

The writers of Saturday Night Live (to whom the Gorch sketches were assigned, rather than Henson's own people as with most other Muppet works) clashed with Henson's vision for the program. Michael O'Donoghue, Alan Zweibel, Al Franken, and Tom Davis often tried to avoid writing the weekly sketches. Henson felt they were trying to write for situational comedy rather than staying within his intended story. Frank Oz eventually acknowledged that the partnership between Henson's team and the show's writers was imperfect, and was thankful the former moved on to The Muppet Show.

Commentators agreed the reception for The Land of Gorch was universally negative; The A.V. Club said it was an in-joke that nobody wanted to keep the sketches on Saturday Night Live. San Francisco Chronicle called the characters the opposite of Kermit the Frog and compared them to trolls. DVD Talk called the feature the worst mistake in the first season of Saturday Night Live. Academic Michael J. Bernsten wrote in his essay "The Muppetry of Nightmares" that the idea failed because the characters were irredeemable and unfunny. Nonetheless, The Land of Gorch was to have a significant effect on later Henson works, such as the feature film The Dark Crystal and the television shows Fraggle Rock and Dinosaurs.

== Premise ==
The Land of Gorch takes place in a world far away from contemporaneous society. The characters live on a fictional, swamp-like planet in a fantasy genre. The set includes volcanoes and prehistoric themes. The environment is dismal and the puppets have grotesque physical appearances.

The creatures each have unique cultural identities and a sense of loyalty towards their inherent, traditional practices. The main characters comprise a royal family that includes King Ploobis, Queen Peuta, and a male child named Wiss. There are also a male servant named Scred, a female servant named Vazh, and a rock prophet named the Mighty Favog. Scred acts like a fervent supporter of dim-witted King Ploobis, while Vazh displays flirtatious qualities.

The Land of Gorch segments deal with adult themes; characters use euphemisms to refer to their sex drives and often consume alcohol. They often contradict each other and act obnoxiously and lasciviously. They grapple with adult issues including death, sexual intercourse, and alcoholism.

== Production ==
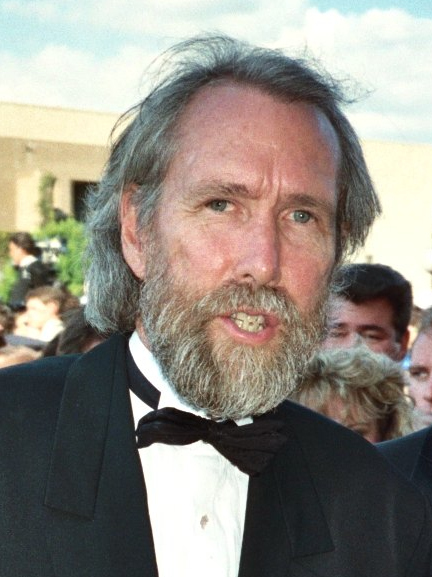
Jim Henson created The Land of Gorch out of a desire to appeal to a more mature audience.

=== Influences ===
Early in his career, Jim Henson's work was aimed at mature audiences. His television program Sam and Friends was designed for young adults. During this period, his characters often appeared on late-night, comedy television programs The Jimmy Dean Show and The Ed Sullivan Show. Throughout the 1960s, Jim Henson used his puppets for profane, irreverent comedy. These early Henson creations made references to substance abuse and sexual intercourse; The A.V. Club said Henson was probably influenced by the work of Ralph Bakshi, who was also active during the 1960s.

=== Conception ===
Jim Henson originally conceived of his Muppets as characters aimed at an adult audience. He was disappointed that the popularity of the characters that appeared in Sesame Street, including Big Bird and Bert and Ernie, had solidified a public perception his puppetry was solely intended for educating children. Henson felt his Muppet characters should be able to be appreciated by individuals of any maturity level, and worried he would be stuck forever working on children's television series. Henson told The Saturday Evening Post he had constantly dealt with others looking down upon the idea of puppet performers. He envied ventriloquist Edgar Bergen for his ability to appeal to a mature audience. Henson said he wanted to work on a program that was broadcast during the peak adult-viewing time and said he had prior difficulty persuading the major television networks to create a puppet program for mature audiences.

Bernie Brillstein, Henson's talent agent, helped him move away from working solely on productions for children. When Henson decided to engage Brillstein as his talent agent, Henson was not well known within the industry. Brillstein was an asset to Henson; his clients included Saturday Night Live executive producer Lorne Michaels and three cast members: Gilda Radner, Dan Aykroyd, and John Belushi. Henson wanted Muppets incorporated into Saturday Night Live as a way to expunge the popular view his characters were only for young audiences. With help from Frank Oz, Henson generated The Land of Gorch characters for use on Saturday Night Live. His new characters were featured in the television program's first season. Henson designed the conceptual framework of The Land of Gorch characters to be eccentric.

=== Design ===
The designs for the characters and associated puppets in The Land of Gorch were created by Michael K. Frith and Henson. The characters were specifically created for Saturday Night Live and were not previously used in the Henson puppet universe. Their appearance was intended to be more realistic than Henson's previous puppet creations; for example, Henson used glass eyes in the models for the first time. "The Mighty Favog" character was co-designed by Frith and Henson. King Ploobis and Scred were designed by Frith. Jerry Juhl and Jerry Nelson assisted with the production of the Muppets during the program.

=== NBC contract and marketing ===
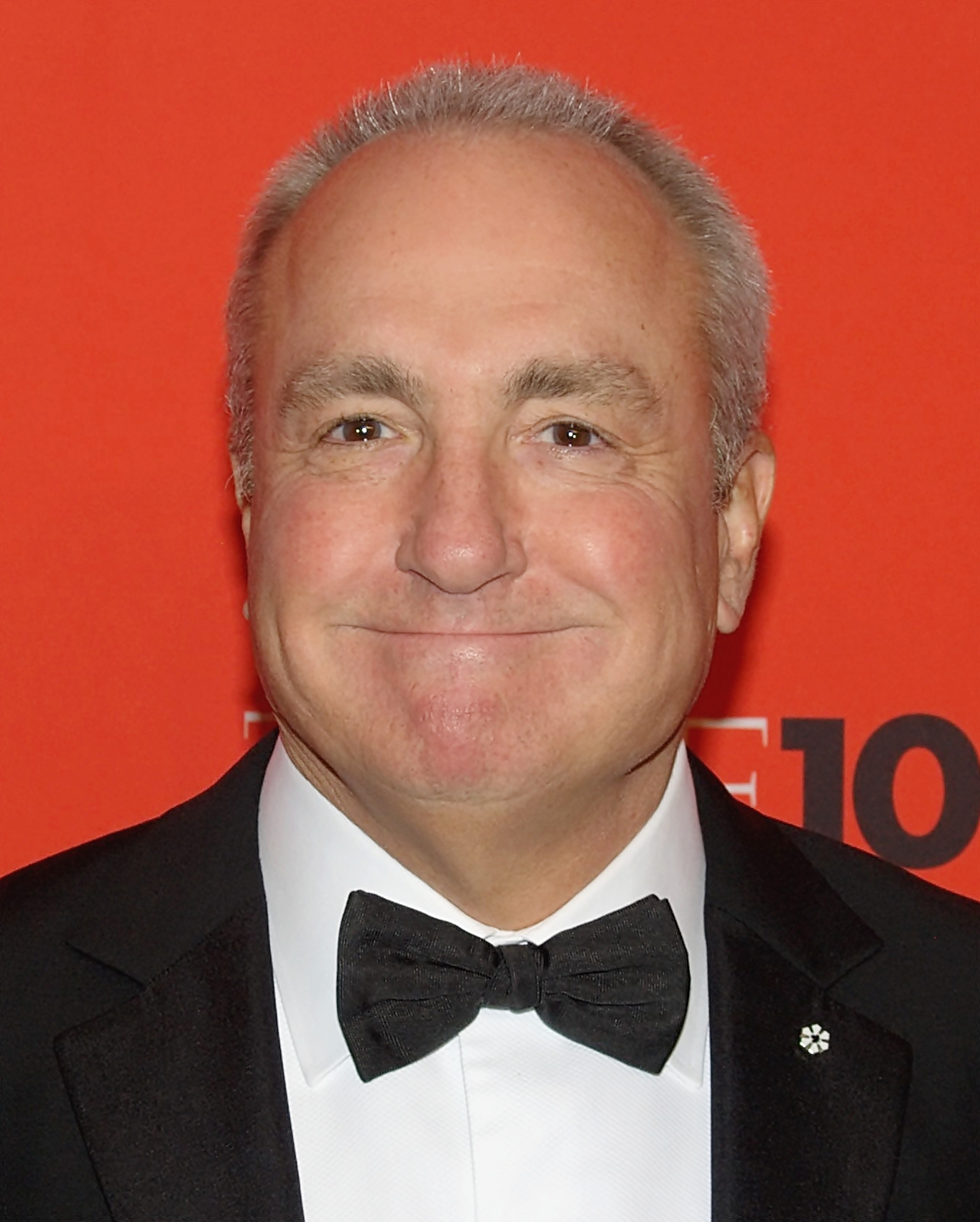
Lorne Michaels said "I'd always liked and been a fan of [the Muppets] and Jim's work."

NBC asked Saturday Night Live's producer Lorne Michaels to add The Land of Gorch to the program to lighten its overall tone. In its initial contract for Saturday Night Live, NBC required producer Lorne Michaels to include short films by comedian Albert Brooks, and Jim Henson and the Muppets. Michaels said he was pleased to be working with Henson on his new show: "I'd always liked and been a fan of [the Muppets] and Jim's work". He said he thought Henson's idea could support a weekly routine on the program. Henson initially called the segment "Muppet Night Creatures" before settling on its final name. "Jim Henson and the Muppets" were marketed as a regular feature of Saturday Night Live before its first episode was hosted by George Carlin.

=== Writing conflicts ===
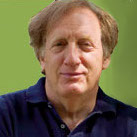
Writer Alan Zweibel said the writers passed off The Land of Gorch each week, not wanting to write the segments.

The writing staff of Saturday Night Live and Henson's team did share some qualities; each group formed a separate social clique and were independently opinionated and creative. They differed in age, experience, and lifestyle—producer Lorne Michaels was 31 years old in 1975, and Henson was nearly 40. Many of the writers were in their 20s. Most of the writers were single and Henson was married with five children at the time.

Because of regulations imposed by the Writers Guild of America, only those employed as writers for Saturday Night Live were allowed to write sketches for the program. Henson and his puppeteers merely performed the scripts for the segments—they were not involved in the writing process.

Saturday Night Live cast members did not enjoy working with The Land of Gorch segments, generally regarded the routines as childish. Writing assignments for The Land of Gorch sketches were given to Saturday Night Live staff as a penalty for being the least-liked among the production team. Writer Michael O'Donoghue said, "I don't write for felt" and, in a 1977 interview for Playboy, called The Land of Gorch characters "mucking Fuppets" and "little hairy facecloths". Saturday Night Live writer Alan Zweibel said the writers drew straws to decide who would draft that week's Muppet routine. Zweibel said that in addition to himself, other writers who disliked working on scripts for The Land of Gorch included O'Donoghue, Al Franken, and Tom Davis. Zweibel had personal disagreements with Henson, who disapproved a few storylines. Henson's associate Jerry Juhl said John Belushi hated having the Muppets on the show. Juhl said they went through virtually every writer on the program trying to find one who would write sketches both parties could agree with.

Michaels said The Land of Gorch characters had been created without a set of rules or boundaries to govern the storylines. He said he felt his writing staff would have been able to work more effectively if there had been more guidelines on the characters' behavior and function. Henson said he felt the type of humor being written for the show was tedious and unimaginative.

=== Cancellation ===
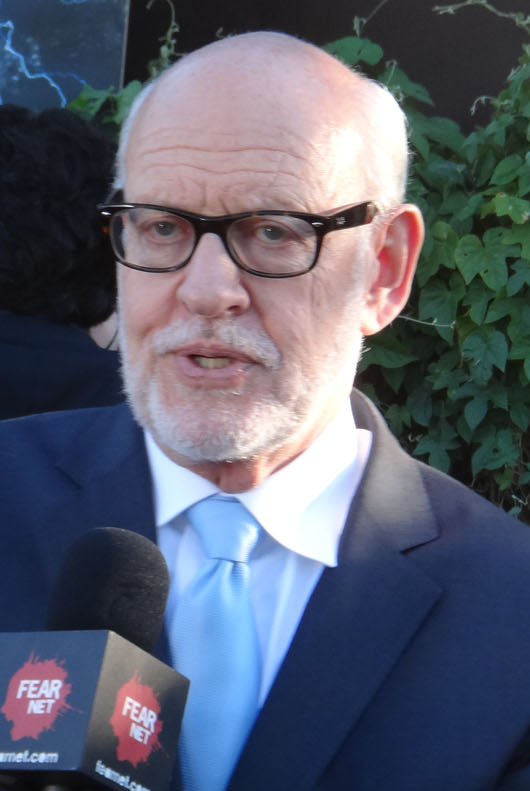
Frank Oz said The Land of Gorch was not a good fit for Saturday Night Live, and was happy to move on to The Muppet Show after its conclusion.

Jim Henson said his ideas did not mesh well with those of the writers. He said his creative team did not form a bond with the writing staff, which, in his opinion, embraced a darkly irritating form of comedy.

Frank Oz said The Land of Gorch experiment had its positives and negatives. Oz said he thought the routine was not a good fit for Saturday Night Live, and that the cartoon-style humor of their characters did not work well with the comedy of Saturday Night Live, much of which was initially derived from the Second City environment. Oz said he generally enjoyed working on Saturday Night Live and witnessing the skill of performers such as Andy Kaufman, Albert Brooks, John Belushi, Chevy Chase, and Dan Aykroyd.

The conflicts between Henson and the Saturday Night Live writers proving insurmountable, The Land of Gorch segments were discontinued from production with the agreement of all parties. By the time Lorne Michaels asked one of his producers, "How do you fire the Muppets?", Henson's staff had already begun to focus on production of The Muppet Show in London; Oz was thankful for the move. The Muppet Show, which was launched in 1976, primarily featured new characters that were not previously seen on Saturday Night Live. Henson later confirmed that part of the reason he decided to stop producing the segments was to focus on The Muppet Show.

== Characters ==
- King Ploobis (performed by Jim Henson) – The greedy and decorative King of the Land of Gorch. He is married to Queen Peuta but has been having an affair with his servant Vazh. King Ploobis is always seeking advice from The Mighty Favog.
- Queen Peuta (performed by Alice Tweedie) – The Queen of the Land of Gorch. She is married to King Ploobis. Due to King Ploobis having an affair with Vazh, Queen Peuta secretly has an affair with Scred. She has three feet and wears shoes that were made from the skins of the Gligs.
- Wisss (performed by Richard Hunt) – The son of King Ploobis and Queen Peuta making him a prince. He is shown to have an addiction to smoking.
- Scred (performed by Jerry Nelson) – King Ploobis' right-hand man and servant who is having an affair with Queen Peuta. Scred is always mistreated by King Ploobis.
- Vazh (performed by Rhonda Hansome in the first appearance, Fran Brill in later appearances)—King Ploobis' lovely servant and mistress.
- The Mighty Favog (performed by Frank Oz) – A living statue who serves as the deity of the Land of Gorch. He would offer his advice to King Ploobis and the planet's other inhabitants in exchange for sacrifices.

== List of episodes ==
No.	Title	Written by	Original release date
1	"George Carlin"	Unknown	October 11, 1975
King Ploobis and Scred go to The Mighty Favog for medical advice when Queen Peuta is unable to "release her darts".
2	"Paul Simon"	Unknown	October 18, 1975
King Ploobis and Scred go to The Mighty Favog for fiscal assistance.
3	"Rob Reiner"	Unknown	October 25, 1975
King Ploobis and Scred discover that Wisss is smoking craters and try to get Wisss to stop.
4	"Candice Bergen"	Unknown	November 8, 1975
King Ploobis wants to eat some Gligs but only two remain. King Ploobis goes to The Mighty Favog to ask how to make more Gligs.
5	"Robert Klein"	Unknown	November 15, 1975
King Ploobis has a headache and Scred tries to cure him of it.
6	"Lily Tomlin"	Jerry Nelson	November 22, 1975
Scred develops a crush on Lily Tomlin and they sing "I Got You Babe".
7	"Richard Pryor"	Unknown	December 13, 1975
After "hitting the sauce", King Ploobis and Scred visit The Mighty Favog.
8	"Candice Bergen"	Unknown	December 20, 1975
King Ploobis throws a Christmas party but most of the guests he has invited have gone to the Killer Bees' Christmas party instead. When Candice Bergen appears at King Ploobis' party, she is disappointed by what she sees. Candice, King Ploobis, and Scred then sing "Have Yourself a Very Merry Christmas", after which Scred takes Candice to the Killer Bees' party.
9	"Elliott Gould"	Unknown	January 10, 1976
Queen Peuta tells Scred she feels guilty about their affair. King Ploobis plans to kill anyone who has been having an affair with his wife. Not sure about what to do, Scred goes to The Mighty Favog for advice.
10	"Buck Henry"	Unknown	January 17, 1976
While King Ploobis is out of town, Scred shows Queen Peuta his new sex device. Rollie Krewson served as assistant puppeteer in this sketch.
11	"Peter Cook and Dudley Moore"	Unknown	January 24, 1976
As Gilda Radner is about to introduce the musical guest, Scred appears in a bee costume planning to appear in the bee version of The Andy Griffith Show, where he is supposed to play Aunt Bee. Gilda tells Scred the sketch was canceled and they both introduce Neil Sedaka.
12	"Jill Clayburgh"	Unknown	February 28, 1976
The characters from "The Land of Gorch" are ostensibly attending the Grammy Awards, so Chevy Chase acts out the sketch. This is the final time the Land of Gorch set is seen, although no Muppets appear in the episode.
13	"Anthony Perkins"	Unknown	March 13, 1976
King Ploobis and Scred approach Anthony Perkins for help to get their sketch back on the air. King Ploobis and Scred return for help in the middle of a later sketch. At the end of the episode, they appear on-stage during the credits and The Mighty Favog appears in the audience.
-	"Ron Nessen"	Unknown	April 17, 1976
The Muppets are announced in the opening credits and were scheduled to appear, but did not feature in the broadcast. Ron Nessen apologizes at the end of the episode, blaming the Muppets' absence on "technical complications".
14	"Raquel Welch"	Jim Henson	April 24, 1976
King Ploobis and Scred realize they are no longer welcome on the show. They could not get lucky with Raquel Welch, who states that they "don't exist below the waist". Chevy Chase tells King Ploobis and Scred their act is canceled. Later in the show, King Ploobis, Scred, and the other characters consult The Mighty Favog, who tells them to get into a trunk.
15	"Madeline Kahn"	Unknown	May 8, 1976
Scred and The Mighty Favog cut a deal with Chevy Chase stating if he can get Lorne Michaels to revive their sketch, The Mighty Favog will arrange for The Beatles to appear on Saturday Night Live.
16	"Lily Tomlin"	Unknown	September 18, 1976
King Ploobis, Queen Peuta, Scred, and Wisss wake in a filing cabinet and assume they are in the afterlife. They think their sketch has been revived and find The Mighty Favog under a dust cover that King Ploobis removes. The Mighty Favog says this may be their last chance on the show and they must do whatever they tell them to do. Lily Tomlin visits The Land of Gorch and states she heard about The Muppet Show that began last week, Wisss says they won't let them be on that show because it is a family show. Lily and "The Land of Gorch" Muppets try to sing "I Whistle a Happy Tune," but "The Land of Gorch" Muppets cannot whistle. Lily leaves, planning to find something else for her and "The Land of Gorch" Muppets to do. The characters appear towards the end of the episode to join everyone in "The Antler Dance".

== Home media ==
The Land of Gorch was released on the Saturday Night Live season one DVD release in December 2006.

== Themes ==
In his essay "The Muppetry of Nightmares", Michael J. Bernsten wrote that The Land of Gorch routines exemplified how disgustingly puppets could act, and illustrated the connection between the uncanny and odd behavior. He commented on the value of Henson's contributions to Saturday Night Live within the artist's larger corpus of work, and said none of Henson's other creations were as profane or grotesque. Bernsten said these qualities made the characters a crucial part of the Muppet timeline.

Bernsten said audiences contemporaneous with the first season of Saturday Night Live were not ready for such characters. He said The Land of Gorch characters behaved so uncannily that audiences did not relate to them because they did not foresee hideous puppets behaving in such a mature manner. Bernsten said this was the reason the characters' pithy one-liner jokes succeeded.

According to Ben Underwood, the characters that appeared in The Land of Gorch were called "Muppets" by Henson and his crew, but diverged significantly from his other creations within the Muppet universe. Underwood said they exhibit a dichotomy of sweet and affectionate behavior while at the same time being disgusting.

Jason Segel, writer and star of the 2011 film The Muppets, likened Henson's efforts with The Land of Gorch to the early struggles by Apple Inc. co-founder Steve Jobs with his burgeoning new company in its early years. Segel said the format did not work with Saturday Night Live because of its edgier tone; "they had created a new world of sort of adult, darker Muppets to fit in with SNL and it didn't quite work".

== Legacy ==
After the conclusion of The Land of Gorch, Henson and his team had learned a great deal from being involved with the production. They gained institutional knowledge about adapting and quickly creating a television program within a seven-day period. He also gained valuable friendships with multiple celebrities through his work on Saturday Night Live. They were later able to use these skills and relationships on Henson's next television venture, The Muppet Show.

In a 1982 interview with Knight-Ridder Newspapers, Henson said ideas for his feature film The Dark Crystal originated from his efforts at character creation on Saturday Night Live. Henson told the Associated Press in 1982 that The Dark Crystal characters evolved directly from his Saturday Night Live creations. Henson described the evolutionary process from The Land of Gorch to Dark Crystal, saying that because The Land of Gorch was featured on late-night television, it helped expand the scope of his puppets, including risqué behavior. He described the challenge that motivated him to further develop concepts from The Land of Gorch on Dark Crystal, saying his next motivation was to draft a universe of puppets for a feature film without humans.

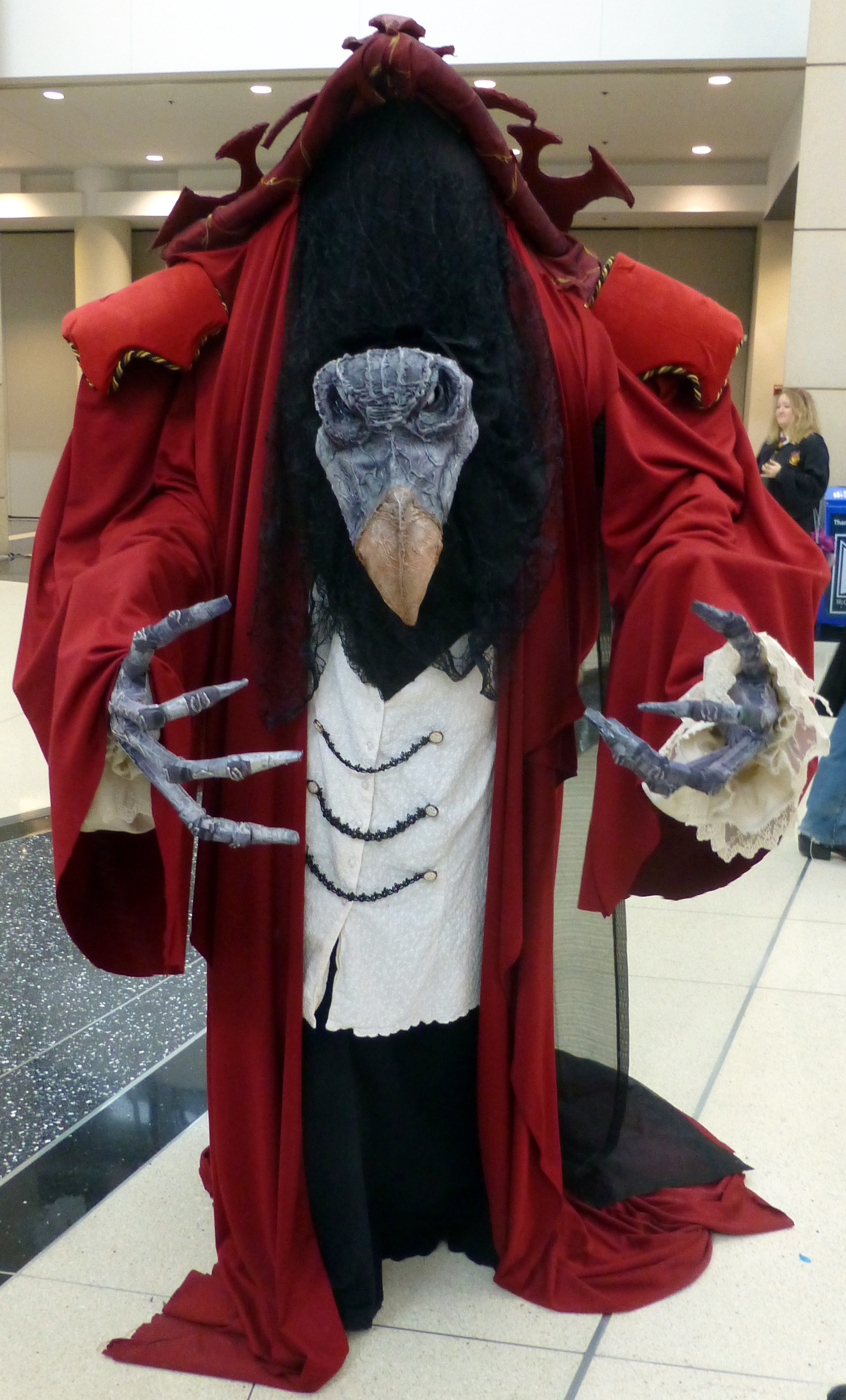
The Land of Gorch influenced Henson's ideas for characters in his feature film The Dark Crystal.

During his work on Saturday Night Live, Henson began to see a vision for "a feature-length, self-sustaining puppetry world devoid of human presence". According to author Catriona McAra, "evolutionary precursors" to The Dark Crystal were found within The Land of Gorch, including the idea of a royal family reliant upon spirituality. In their book Saturday Night: A Backstage History of Saturday Night Live, Doug Hill and Jeff Weingrad said The Land of Gorch produced the prototypes for characters that would appear in The Dark Crystal. The Land of Gorch sketches were the first time Henson had used taxidermy eyeballs in one of his characters. He used this technique in The Dark Crystal. Henson said his experience on Saturday Night Live prompted him to investigate ways to make his creations more lifelike in appearance.

The Jim Henson Company production Dinosaurs used similar plot-lines from The Land of Gorch, including a story about environmentalism.

The Land of Gorch influenced later works within the Jim Henson universe as well, including the television show Dinosaurs produced by The Jim Henson Company. The first episode of Dinosaurs featured a plot line supporting environmentalism that was similar to an episode of The Land of Gorch. The Land of Gorch segment from the November 8, 1975 episode of Saturday Night Live hosted by Candice Bergen included themes that were reused in Dinosaurs.

The puppets used in The Land of Gorch were archived by The Jim Henson Company in their historical collection. The Company held its first exhibition of characters in 1979 to coincide with the release of The Muppet Movie. Characters from The Land of Gorch were featured in this exhibition, which was held in the New York Public Library for the Performing Arts at the Lincoln Center for the Performing Arts. In 2006, Henson's Muppet character model "Scred" was featured as a highlight of his body of work in the exhibit "Jim Henson: Performing Artist" at the University of Maryland's Clarice Smith Performing Arts Center.

In a 2011 appearance as host of Saturday Night Live while promoting his film The Muppets, Jason Segel mentioned The Land of Gorch in his opening monologue. In a follow-up interview, he was asked about the possibility of re-introducing The Land of Gorch to popular culture, and said, "I think that that is a reference that is probably lost to time ... They weren't even famous then". In 2013, writer Jay Fosgitt marketed to publishing company Archaia Entertainment the idea of reviving The Land of Gorch characters in comic book format with a new storyline.

== Critical reception ==
Writing for The A.V. Club, Phil Dyess-Nugent said "nobody wanted this shit on the show" became an in-joke among the Saturday Night Live staff. He said although he was unsure of the reason for the concept's lack of success on Saturday Night Live, he remembered skipping through the sketch to watch other parts of the episode. Writing for the same publication, Erik Adams called the sketches uninspired and one of the low points of Henson's working relationship with NBC. The San Francisco Chronicle wrote that The Land of Gorch characters appeared antithetical to Kermit the Frog and compared them to trolls.

USA Today television critic Robert Bianco posited that the characters were not successful owing to an imbalance between the initial appeal of the Muppets to youth and the mature comedy used in Henson's other endeavors. Author Jake Austen said Henson's characters were "unappreciated Muppets". Vogue said the sketches feature "proto-Muppets" behaving oddly in a dystopian future world. Associated Press called the characters Muppets in a disturbing and horrifying context.

The Economist described Henson's Saturday Night Live characters as his odd children who were known to muse about aspects of philosophy. DVD Talk described The Land of Gorch as the most serious mistake from the first season of Saturday Night Live, adding that the characters lacked humor and that the length of the sketches brought each episode to a dead stop. Author Wesley Hyatt said the only redeeming scene from the sketches was a duet between Lily Tomlin and Scred, singing "I Got You Babe".

"They are probably the most unlikable Muppets ever created."

— Michael J. Bernsten, "The Muppetry of Nightmares"

Michael J. Bernsten wondered why The Land of Gorch characters were not appreciated, saying they were unfunny, unintelligent, and devoid of redeeming characteristics. He said, "They are probably the most unlikable Muppets ever created". Bernsten attributed this notoriety to the Saturday Night Live writing staff rather than Jim Henson or Frank Oz. He said the staff's lack of motivation to produce imaginative writing contributed to bland dialogue between the characters.

In her essay "Emmet Otter's Jug-Band Christmas: The Gift of the Muppets", Catherine Edwards describes The Land of Gorch sketches as a critical flop, but interprets this as a boon for Muppet fans, since the failure of the skits resulted in Henson's next venture, The Muppet Show.

== See also ==
- Our Place series
- Recurring Saturday Night Live characters and sketches
