= How to Succeed in Business Without Really Trying (soundtrack) =

How to Succeed in Business Without Really Trying: Original Motion Picture Soundtrack

Soundtrack album
- Released: 1967
- Label: United Artists

The original soundtrack to the 1967 motion picture How to Succeed in Business Without Really Trying was released by United Artists Records in the same year.

== Critical reception ==
Professional ratings
Review scores
Source	Rating
Billboard	(positive)
HiFi/Stereo Review	(no rating)

Billboard picked the album for its "Soundtrack spotlight" section. The magazine's reviewer noted: "Stars of the original Broadway cast, Robert Morse, Michele Lee and Rudy Vallee, have been retained for the screen version, and add an exciting spark to the LP."

== Commercial performance ==
The album spent four weeks on Billboard's Top LPs chart, peaking at number 146.

== Track listing ==
LP – United Artists UAL 4151 (mono), UAS 5151 (stereo)

All lyrics are written by Frank Loesser; all music is composed by Frank Loesser.

Side 1
No.	Title	Artist(s)	Length
1.	"Overture" – "How to Succeed in Business Without Really Trying"	Robert Morse	5:50
2.	"Coffee Break"	Anthony Teague, Kay Reynolds and Company	2:29
3.	"The Company Way"	Robert Morse, Sammy Smith, Anthony Teague and Company	2:28
4.	"A Secretary Is Not a Toy"	John Myhers and Ensemble	4:21
5.	"The Company Way" (Finch's frolic) (Instr.)		1:10
6.	"Been a Long Day"	Robert Morse, Michele Lee, Kay Reynolds	2:57

Side 2
No.	Title	Artist(s)	Length
1.	"Grand Old Ivy"	Rudy Vallee, Robert Morse	1:24
2.	"Rosemary"	Robert Morse	2:53
3.	"I Believe in You"	Michele Lee	2:46
4.	"The Company Way" and "Paris Original" (Company party) (Instrumental)		3:10
5.	"I Believe in You – Reprise" ("Gotta Stop That Man")	Robert Morse & Co.	4:03
6.	"Brotherhood of Man"	Robert Morse, Rudy Vallee, Ruth Kobart and Company	3:36
7.	"Finale"	Entire Company	2:20

== Personnel ==
- Nelson Riddle – music supervisor and conductor

== Charts ==
Chart (1967)	Peak position
US Billboard Top LPs	146
