= Madeline Kahn =

American actress (1942–1999)

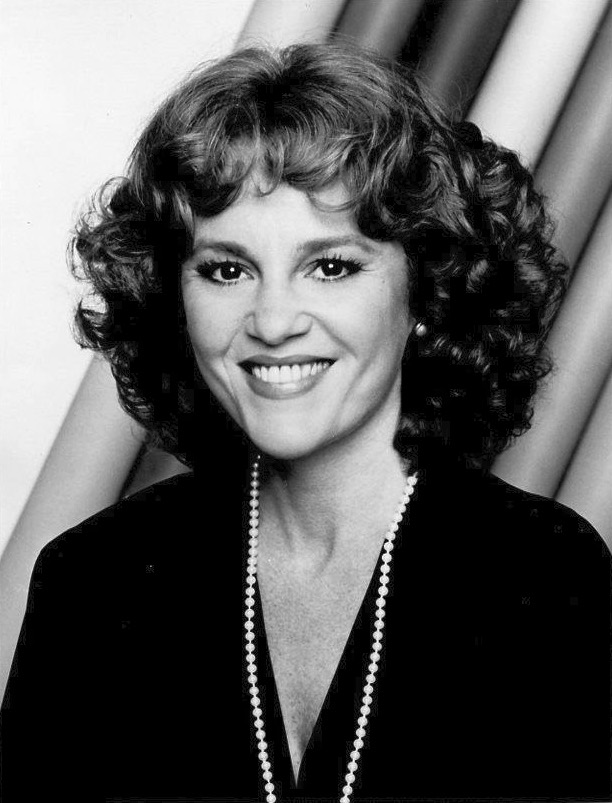
- Kahn in 1983
- Born: Madeline Gail Wolfson; September 29, 1942; Boston, Massachusetts, U.S.
- Died: December 3, 1999 (aged 57); New York City, U.S.
- Education: Hofstra University
- Occupations: Actress; comedian; singer
- Years active: 1964–1999
- Spouse: John Hansbury (m. 1999)

Madeline Gail Kahn (née Wolfson; September 29, 1942 – December 3, 1999) was an American actress, comedian, and singer. She was known for her comedic roles in films directed by Peter Bogdanovich and Mel Brooks, including What's Up, Doc? (1972), Young Frankenstein (1974), High Anxiety (1977), History of the World, Part I (1981), and her Academy Award–nominated roles in Paper Moon (1973) and Blazing Saddles (1974).

Kahn made her Broadway debut in Leonard Sillman's New Faces of 1968, and received Tony Award nominations for the play In the Boom Boom Room in 1974 and for the original production of the musical On the Twentieth Century in 1978. She starred as Madeline Wayne on the short-lived sitcom Oh Madeline (1983–84) and won a Daytime Emmy Award in 1987 for an ABC Afterschool Special. She received a third Tony Award nomination for the revival of the play Born Yesterday in 1989, before winning the 1993 Tony Award for Best Actress in a Play for the comedy The Sisters Rosensweig. Her other film appearances included The Cheap Detective (1978), Yellowbeard (1983), City Heat (1984), Clue (1985), and Nixon (1995).

== Early life and education ==
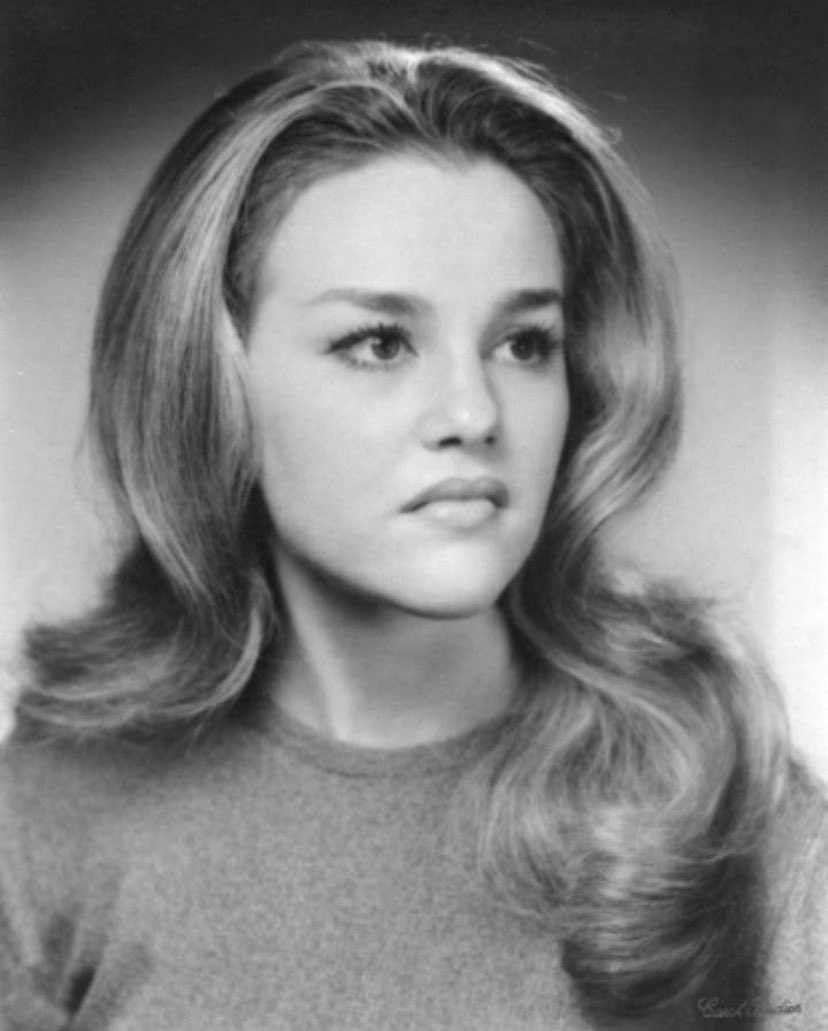
Madeline Kahn in Hofstra University's 1964 yearbook.

Kahn was born on September 29, 1942, in Boston, Massachusetts, the daughter of Bernard B. Wolfson, a garment manufacturer, and his wife Freda (née Goldberg). She was raised in a non-observant Jewish family. Her parents divorced when Kahn was two, and she moved with her mother to New York City. In 1953, Freda married Hiller Kahn, who later adopted Madeline; Freda eventually changed her own name to Paula Kahn. Madeline Kahn had two half-siblings: Jeffrey (from her mother's marriage to Kahn) and Robyn (from her father's second marriage).

In 1948, Kahn was sent to the progressive Manumit School, a boarding school in Bristol, Pennsylvania. During that time, her mother pursued her acting dream. Kahn soon began acting and performed in a number of school productions. In 1960, she graduated from Martin Van Buren High School in Queens, New York, and then earned a drama scholarship to Hofstra University on Long Island. At Hofstra, she studied drama, music, and speech therapy. Kahn graduated from Hofstra in 1964 with a degree in speech therapy. She was a member of a local sorority on campus, Delta Chi Delta. She later studied singing in New York City with Beverley Peck Johnson.

== Career ==
When asked on television by Kitty Carlisle and Charles Nelson Reilly how she began the opera aspect of her career, Kahn said:

It's so hard to determine exactly when I began or why, singing. The Muse was definitely not in attendance. I'll tell you exactly.

To earn money while a college student, Kahn was a singing waitress at a Bavarian restaurant named Bavarian Manor, a Hofbrau in New York's Hudson Valley. She also sang musical comedy numbers during shows.

There was a really important customer there, a big Italian man, who shouted out to me 'Sing Madame Butterfly', and of course he didn't mean the whole opera. He meant that one very popular aria, "Un Bel Di". So, if I was to come back the next summer to earn more money during the next year, I'd better know that aria. You know, and I didn't know anything about it; I just learned that one aria and a few others and then one thing led to another and I studied that, and I discovered that I could sing that, sort of, that way. But my first actual thing that I did was Candide for Leonard Bernstein's 50th birthday at Philharmonic Hall—at the time that's what it was called. And I don't know if that was an opera, but it was very hard to sing. I actually have done Musetta in La Bohème a long time ago in Washington, DC. I mean, utterly terrifying. I mean, basically I feel as though I was asked to do it and I did it.

=== 1960s ===
Kahn began auditioning for professional acting roles shortly after graduating from Hofstra; on the side, she briefly taught public school. Just before adopting the professional name Madeline Kahn (Kahn was her stepfather's surname), she made her stage debut as a chorus girl in a revival of Kiss Me, Kate, which led her to join Actors' Equity. Her part in the musical How Now, Dow Jones was written out before the 1967 show reached Broadway.

In 1968, Kahn performed her first professional lead in a special concert performance of the operetta Candide in honor of Leonard Bernstein's 50th birthday. She made her Broadway debut in 1968 with Leonard Sillman's New Faces of 1968 and also appeared off-Broadway in the musical Promenade.

=== 1970s and 1980s ===
Kahn appeared in two Broadway musicals in the 1970s: a featured role in Richard Rodgers' 1970 Noah's Ark–themed show Two by Two (singing a high C) and a lead turn as Lily Garland in 1978's On the Twentieth Century. She left (or, reportedly, was fired from) the latter show early in its run, yielding the role to understudy Judy Kaye. She starred in a 1977 Town Hall semi-staged concert version of She Loves Me (opposite Barry Bostwick and original London cast member Rita Moreno).

Kahn's film debut was in the 1968 short De Düva (The Dove). Her feature debut was as Ryan O'Neal's character's hysterical fiancée in Peter Bogdanovich's screwball comedy What's Up, Doc? (1972) starring Barbra Streisand. Her film career continued with Bogdanovich's Paper Moon (1973), for which she was nominated for an Academy Award for Best Supporting Actress for her role as brassy carnival-style dancer Trixie Delight.

Kahn was cast in the role of Agnes Gooch in the 1974 film Mame, but star Lucille Ball fired Kahn due to artistic differences. (Several of Ball's biographies say Kahn was eager to be released from the role so that she could join the cast of Blazing Saddles, a film about to go into production. Kahn stated in a 1996 interview with Charlie Rose that she was fired.) Ball's version was that Kahn had already been offered Blazing Saddles and thus deliberately got herself fired by poorly acting in the first few days of shooting for Mame.

A close succession of comedies—Blazing Saddles (1974), Young Frankenstein (1974), and High Anxiety (1977)—were all directed by Mel Brooks, who was able to bring out the best of Kahn's comic talents. Their last collaboration was 1981's History of the World, Part I. For Blazing Saddles, she received her second Academy Award nomination. In the April 2006 issue of Premiere, her performance in Blazing Saddles as jaded cabaret singer Lili von Shtupp was selected as number 74 on its list of the 100 greatest performances of all time.

In 1975, Kahn again teamed with Bogdanovich to co-star with Burt Reynolds and Cybill Shepherd in the musical At Long Last Love. The film was a critical and financial disaster, but Kahn largely escaped blame for the failure. At Long Last Love was one of three films in which Kahn worked alongside the character actress Eileen Brennan, the other two being The Cheap Detective and Clue. In that same year, she again teamed with Gene Wilder, this time for his comedy The Adventure of Sherlock Holmes' Smarter Brother. In 1978, Kahn's comic screen persona reached another peak with her portrayal of Mrs. Montenegro in Neil Simon's The Cheap Detective (1978), a spoof of both Casablanca and The Maltese Falcon, directed by Robert Moore. That role was followed by a cameo in 1979's The Muppet Movie.

Kahn's roles were primarily comedic rather than dramatic, although the 1970s found her originating roles in two plays that had elements of both: 1973's In the Boom Boom Room on Broadway and 1977's Marco Polo Sings a Solo off-Broadway.

After her success in Brooks' films, Kahn appeared in a number of films in the 1980s. She played Mrs. White in 1985's Clue, First Lady Constance Link in the 1980 spoof First Family, a twin from outer space in the Jerry Lewis sci-fi comedy Slapstick of Another Kind (1982), the love interest of Burt Reynolds in the crime comedy City Heat (1984), and Draggle in the animated film My Little Pony: The Movie (1986). She voiced the character Gussie Mausheimer in the animated film An American Tail. According to animator Don Bluth, she was cast because he was "hoping she would use a voice similar to the one she used as a character in Mel Brooks' Blazing Saddles."

In 1983, Kahn starred in her own short-lived TV sitcom, Oh Madeline, which ended after one season due to poor ratings. In 1986, she starred in ABC Comedy Factory's pilot of Chameleon, which never aired on the fall schedule. In 1987, Kahn won a Daytime Emmy award for her performance in the ABC Afterschool Special Wanted: The Perfect Guy.

Kahn returned to the stage as Billie Dawn in the 1989 Broadway revival of Born Yesterday, for which she was nominated for the Tony Award for Best Actress in a Play.

=== 1990s ===
Kahn played the mother of Molly Ringwald's character in the 1990 film Betsy's Wedding, and shortly after she recorded a voice for the animated movie The Magic 7, which, as of 2024, has still not been released. In 1994, she portrayed suicide hotline worker Blanche Munchnik in the holiday farce Mixed Nuts. Kahn played the corrupt mayor in a benefit concert performance of Anyone Can Whistle in 1995. She appeared in Nixon as Martha Beall Mitchell (1995).

On stage, Kahn played Dr. Gorgeous in Wendy Wasserstein's 1993 Broadway play The Sisters Rosensweig, a role for which she earned a Tony Award for Best Actress in a Play. She was a member of the cast of Cosby (1996–99) as Pauline, the eccentric friend and neighbor.

Kahn participated in a workshop reading of Dear World at the Roundabout Theatre Company in June 1998, reading the part of Gabrielle. She also voiced Gypsy the moth in A Bug's Life (1998).

Kahn received good reviews for her Chekhovian turn in the 1999 independent movie Judy Berlin, her final film. Before her death, she also voiced Mrs. Shapiro on the first two episodes of Little Bill, the second of which ("Just a Baby" / "The Campout") was dedicated to her memory. Kathy Najimy succeeded her in the role following Kahn's death.

== Illness and death ==
Kahn was diagnosed with ovarian cancer in September 1998. She underwent treatment, continued to work on Cosby, and married John Hansbury in October 1999. However, the disease spread rapidly, and she died on December 3, 1999, at age 57.

She was cremated on December 6, at Garden State Crematory in North Bergen, New Jersey. A bench dedicated to her memory was erected in Central Park by her husband John and her brother Jeffrey. The bench is located near the Jacqueline Kennedy Onassis Reservoir on West 87th Street.

== Filmography ==
=== Film ===
Year	Title	Roles	Notes
1968	The Dove	Sigfrid	Short subject
1972	What's Up, Doc?	Eunice Burns	
1973	Paper Moon	Trixie Delight	
1973	From the Mixed-Up Files of Mrs. Basil E. Frankweiler	Schoolteacher	
1974	Blazing Saddles	Lili Von Shtupp	
1974	Young Frankenstein	Elizabeth Benning	
1975	At Long Last Love	Kitty O'Kelly	
1975	The Adventure of Sherlock Holmes' Smarter Brother	Jenny Hill	
1976	Won Ton Ton, the Dog Who Saved Hollywood	Estie Del Ruth	
1977	High Anxiety	Victoria Brisbane	
1978	The Cheap Detective	Mrs. Montenegro	
1979	The Muppet Movie	El Sleezo Patron	
1980	Simon	Dr. Cynthia Mallory	
1980	Happy Birthday, Gemini	Bunny Weinberger	
1980	Wholly Moses!	The Witch	
1980	First Family	Mrs. Constance Link	
1981	History of the World, Part I	Empress Nympho	
1982	Slapstick of Another Kind	Eliza Swain / Lutetia Swain	
1983	Yellowbeard	Betty	
1983	Scrambled Feet	Madeline	
1984	City Heat	Caroline Howley	
1985	Clue	Mrs. White	
1986	My Little Pony: The Movie	Draggle	Voice
1986	An American Tail	Gussie Mausheimer	Voice
1990	Betsy's Wedding	Lola Hopper	
1994	Mixed Nuts	Mrs. Munchnik	
1995	Nixon	Martha Mitchell	
1998	A Bug's Life	Gypsy	Voice
1999	Judy Berlin	Alice Gold	Final film role

=== Television ===
Year	Show	Role	Notes
1972	Harvey	Nurse Ruth Kelly	TV movie
1973	Adam's Rib	Doris	2 episodes
1975	The Carol Burnett Show	Mavis Danton	Episode: #10.4
1976–95	Saturday Night Live	Host	3 episodes
1977	The Muppet Show	Special Guest Star	Episode 209
1978–97	Sesame Street	Herself / various	12 episodes
1981	Fridays	Host	Episode 35
1983–84	Oh Madeline	Madeline Wayne	19 episodes; Also creator, producer, and writer
1986	Comedy Factory CTV	Violet Kinsey	Episode 6: "Chameleon"
1987–88	Mr. President	Lois Gullickson	14 episodes
1988	Sesame Street, Special	Herself	TV special
1991	Road to Avonlea	Pigeon Plumtree	Episode: "It's Just a Stage"
1992	Lucky Luke	Esperanza	Season 1, episode 1
1992	For Richer, for Poorer	Billie	TV movie
1993	Monkey House	Grace Anderson	Episode: "More Stately Mansions"
1993	Dr. Seuss Video Classics: Dr. Seuss's Sleep Book	Narrator	VHS special
1995	New York News	Nan Chase	13 episodes
1996	Ivana Trump's For Love Alone	Sabrina	TV movie
1996	London Suite	Sharon Semple	TV movie
1996–99	Cosby	Pauline Fox	84 episodes
1999	Little Bill	Mrs. Shapiro (voice)	Ep: "Just a Baby/The Campout"

== Theater ==
Year	Production	Role	Venue
1965	Kiss Me, Kate	Chorister	Concert, Off-Broadway
1965	Just for Openers	Performer	Upstairs at the Downstairs, Off-Broadway
1966	Mixed Doubles	Performer	Upstairs at the Downstairs, Off-Broadway
1966	Below the Belt	Performer	Upstairs at the Downstairs, Off-Broadway
1967	How Now, Dow Jones	Performer (replacement)	Lunt-Fontanne Theatre, Broadway
1968	Candide	Cunegonde	New York Concert, Off-Broadway
1968	New Faces of 1968	Performer	Booth Theatre, Broadway
1969	Promenade	Servant	Promenade Theatre, Off-Broadway
1970	Two by Two	Goldie	Imperial Theatre, Broadway
1973	In the Boom Boom Room	Chrissy	Vivian Beaumont Theatre, Broadway
1977	She Loves Me	Amalia Balash	Town Hall Concert
1978	Marco Polo Sings a Solo	Dianna McBride	The Public Theater, Off-Broadway
1978	On the Twentieth Century	Lily Garland	St. James Theatre, Broadway
1983	Blithe Spirit	Madame Arcati	Santa Fe Festival Theater
1985	What's Wrong with this Picture?	Shirley	Manhattan Theatre Club, Broadway
1989	Born Yesterday	Billie Dawn	46th Street Theatre, Broadway
1992	Hello, Dolly!	Dolly	Limited Tour
1992	Sondheim: A Celebration at Carnegie Hall	Performer	Concert at Carnegie Hall
1993	The Sisters Rosensweig	Gorgeous Teitelbaum	Ethel Barrymore Theatre, Broadway
1995	Anyone Can Whistle	Cora	Concert at Carnegie Hall
1998	Dear World	Gabrielle	Roundabout Theatre Company Workshop

== Awards and nominations ==
- Year given is year of ceremony

Year	Award	Category	Work	Result	Ref
1973	Golden Globe Award	New Star Actress of the Year	What's Up, Doc?	Nominated	
1974	Golden Globe Award	Best Supporting Actress - Motion Picture	Paper Moon	Nominated	
1974	Academy Award	Best Supporting Actress	Paper Moon	Nominated	
1974	Drama Desk Award	Outstanding Performance	In the Boom Boom Room	Won	
1974	Tony Award	Best Actress in a Play	In the Boom Boom Room	Nominated	
1975	Golden Globe Award	Best Supporting Actress - Motion Picture	Young Frankenstein	Nominated	
1975	Academy Award	Best Supporting Actress	Blazing Saddles	Nominated	
1978	Tony Award	Best Actress in a Musical	On the Twentieth Century	Nominated	
1984	Golden Globe Award	Best Actress - Television Musical or Comedy	Oh Madeline	Nominated	
1984	People's Choice Award	Favorite Female Performer in a New TV Series	Oh Madeline	Won	
1987	Daytime Emmy Award	Outstanding Performer in Children's Programming	ABC Afterschool Special: Wanted: The Perfect Guy	Won	
1989	Tony Award	Best Actress in a Play	Born Yesterday	Nominated	
1993	Drama Desk Award	Outstanding Featured Actress in a Play	The Sisters Rosensweig	Won	
1993	Tony Award	Best Actress in a Play	The Sisters Rosensweig	Won	
Honorary awards
2003		American Theatre Hall of Fame	—N/a	Inductee	
