= List of Fridays episodes =

Fridays is a sketch comedy and variety show that aired on the American Broadcasting Company for three seasons from April 11, 1980 to April 23, 1982. Taking cues from NBC's Saturday Night Live, Fridays had a small cast with differing backgrounds in comedy and performance; comedic sketches that ranged from political satire and pop culture spoofs to situational humor featuring quirky characters and recurring bits; a recurring news segment, and celebrity hosts and musical guests.

== Series overview ==
| Season | Episodes | Originally released | |
| Season | Episodes | First released | Last released |
|---|---|---|---|
| 1 | 12 | April 11, 1980 | July 18, 1980 |
| 2 | 25 | September 5, 1980 | May 15, 1981 |
| 3 | 21 | September 18, 1981 | April 23, 1982 |

== Episodes ==
=== Season 1 (1980) ===
| No. overall | No. in season | Musical guest(s) | Written by | Original release date |
|---|---|---|---|---|
| 1 | 1 | Kenny Loggins | Steve Adams, Larry Charles, Bryan Gordon, Sam Hefter, Bruce Kirschbaum, Thomas Kramer, Elaine Pope, Fred Raker, Joe Shulkin | April 11, 1980 |
Sketches include "Backstage: Fridays Will Not Be a Saturday Night Live Clone," "Ken The Monster," "Friday Edition" (featuring the Friday Focus Report: Muppet Fur Hunt), "Conversation at The Bar," "V.I.S.T.A.H. (Volunteers in Service to Affluent Honkeys)" "He Wants It (a.k.a. "Ah Kee Boo!")", "Police Gynecologist" (Michael Nesmith/William Dear film), "Howdy Doody I," "Los Angeles School for Doormen," and "Door to Door Whores" Kenny Loggins performs "Keep the Fire" and "This Is It."
| 2 | 2 | The Boomtown Rats | Steve Adams, Larry Charles, Bryan Gordon, Sam Hefter, Bruce Kirschbaum, Thomas Kramer, Elaine Pope, Fred Raker, Joe Shulkin | April 18, 1980 |
Sketches include "Citizen Kane 'Rosebud' Send-Up," "Bruce Mahler and Johann the Parakeet Play Violin," "Skunkman: The Bank Robbery," "Friday Edition" (featuring Tom Palmer's "The Underwear People" and John Roarke as Ted Kennedy), "Akron A.M.: Pastor Babbitt and the Homosexual Problem," "Stranger Than Anything: The Missing Nipple," "Dick the Womanizer: The Piano Bar", "Accountant Groupies," "Chatty Lady at the Sidewalk Restaurant," "Sully Mullins: Temp Secretary of State", "Security Guard TV Promo", and "Shake Your Faith" (a.k.a. The Disco Religious Revival Show). The Boomtown Rats performs "Someone's Looking at You" and "I Don't Like Mondays."
| 3 | 3 | The Clash | Steve Adams, Larry Charles, Bryan Gordon, Sam Hefter, Bruce Kirschbaum, Thomas Kramer, Elaine Pope, Fred Raker, Joe Shulkin | April 25, 1980 |
Sketches include "Diner of the Living Dead," "Chatty Lady on the Escalator," "Friday Edition," "Herpes Test II," "The Inflatable Nun," "Women Who Spit," and "Solly Mullin: Temporary Lawyer." The Clash performs "London Calling," "Train in Vain," "The Guns of Brixton" and "Clampdown."; NOTE: Many ABC affiliates stopped broadcasting the show after this episode due to viewer complaints about the objectionable content, specifically in the sketches "Diner of the Living Dead" (which centered on zombie gore and cannibalism), "The Inflatable Nun" (which showed a priest [Mark Blankfield] ordering an inflatable sex doll nun), and "Women Who Spit" (which showed women as part of a round-table discussion show spitting on the floor). Reruns of this show on ABC and the short-lived syndicated run on USA did not include the "Diner of the Living Dead" sketch, but did include the other two sketches. The episode is available in full on Shout! Factory's Best of Fridays DVD set, as well as the "Best of Fridays" compilations shown on Hulu Plus and Tubi TV.
| 4 | 4 | Warren Zevon | Steve Adams, Larry Charles, Bryan Gordon, Sam Hefter, Bruce Kirschbaum, Thomas Kramer, Elaine Pope, Fred Raker, Joe Shulkin | May 9, 1980 |
Sketches include "Dr. Pain, The Sadistic Chiropractor." Warren Zevon performs "Gorilla, You're a Desperado" and "Johnny Strikes Up the Band."
| 5 | 5 | Boz Scaggs | Steve Adams, Larry Charles, Bryan Gordon, Sam Hefter, Bruce Kirschbaum, Thomas Kramer, Elaine Pope, Fred Raker, Joe Shulkin | May 16, 1980 |
Sketches includes: "Chatty Lady Can't Get a Studio Audience Seat," "Melanie Chartoff and Johann the Parakeet," "Ted Kennedy's Image Problem," "Dick at the Gym," "The Friday Edition (featuring Maryedith Burrell's field report on a new swear word)", "Luis Valdez's Gringo Coffee", "Matzoi!", and "The Last Male Heterosexual in San Francisco." Boz Scaggs performs "Breakdown Dead Ahead" and "JoJo."
| 6 | 6 | Devo | Steve Adams, Larry Charles, Bryan Gordon, Sam Hefter, Bruce Kirschbaum, Thomas Kramer, Elaine Pope, Fred Raker, Joe Shulkin | May 23, 1980 |
Sketches include "Cold Open: Devo's Dressing Room," "The Emperor Strikes Back" (a.k.a. "Darth Vader and the Reagans"), "Kenny The Monster: The High School Reunion," "George Bargate: The Jehovah's Witnesses," "Chalk Outlines" (short film), "The Mommy and Daddy Substitute Hotline," "The Brotherhood of Men Who Hum Between Words," and "Friday Edition" (featuring the Friday Focus Report). Devo performs "Girl U Want" and "Gates of Steel."
| 7 | 7 | Ian Hunter | Steve Adams, Larry Charles, Bryan Gordon, Sam Hefter, Bruce Kirschbaum, Thomas Kramer, Elaine Pope, Fred Raker, Joe Shulkin | May 30, 1980 |
Sketches include "Solly Mullins: Temp. Beatle." Ian Hunter performs "We Gotta Get Out of Here" and "Once Bitten, Twice Shy."
| 8 | 8 | Tom Petty and the Heartbreakers | Steve Adams, Rod Ash, Larry Charles, Bryan Gordon, Sam Hefter, Bruce Kirschbaum, Thomas Kramer, Elaine Pope, Fred Raker, Joe Shulkin | June 6, 1980 |
Sketches include "Johannes the Friday's Parakeet Needs Marijuana Seeds," "Prostitution Debate with Pastor Babbitt," "Friday Edition," "George Bargate Takes the Census," "Matzoi," "Bite the Bullet" (Tom Kramer short film), and "Western Saloon". Tom Petty and the Heartbreakers performs "Shadow of a Doubt" and "American Girl."
| 9 | 9 | The Beach Boys | Steve Adams, Rod Ash, Larry Charles, Bryan Gordon, Sam Hefter, Bruce Kirschbaum, Thomas Kramer, Elaine Pope, Fred Raker, Joe Shulkin | June 20, 1980 |
Sketches include "Family Feud: The Kennedys vs. The Carters," "Friday Edition," "Computer Dating," "Awkward Strip Club Encounter," "Chatty Lady Backstage on Fridays", "Battle Boy," "Tom Kramer's Jazz Brunch," and "Stranger Than Anything: Caveman Muffins" The Beach Boys performs "Keepin' the Summer Alive" and a medley of "Good Vibrations" and "Goin' On."
| 10 | 10 | Graham Parker | Steve Adams, Rod Ash, Larry Charles, Bryan Gordon, Sam Hefter, Bruce Kirschbaum, Thomas Kramer, Elaine Pope, Fred Raker, Joe Shulkin | June 27, 1980 |
Sketches include: "Fridays Convention Coverage: Reagan's Running Mate," "Family Breaks the Fourth Wall," "Friday Edition (featuring Friday Focus: Mannequin Refugees)," "Nauseating Spasms" (Tom Kramer film), and "Dick the Womanizer: Jeans Shopping". Graham Parker performs "Empty Lives" and "Stupefaction."
| 11 | 11 | The Jam | Steve Adams, Rod Ash, Larry Charles, Bryan Gordon, Sam Hefter, Bruce Kirschbaum, Thomas Kramer, Elaine Pope, Fred Raker, Joe Shulkin | July 11, 1980 |
Sketches include "Ken the Monster in Urban Cowboy", The Jam performs "Start!" and "Private Hell."
| 12 | 12 | Journey | Steve Adams, Rod Ash, Larry Charles, Bryan Gordon, Sam Hefter, Bruce Kirschbaum, Thomas Kramer, Elaine Pope, Fred Raker, Joe Shulkin | July 18, 1980 |
Sketches include "Solly Mullins: Temp Member of the National Organization for Women," "Friday Edition," "Bowler Wine," "Pat's Funeral," "Curse of the Cooties," "Tom Kramer's The Summer Lawn Games", and "Newspaper Family." Journey performs "Walks Like a Lady" and "Where Were You."

=== Season 2 (1980–81) ===
| No. overall | No. in season | Musical guest(s) | Guest star(s) | Written by | Original release date |
|---|---|---|---|---|---|
| 13 | 1 | Eddie Money | none | Steve Adams, Joe Shulkin (head writers), Rod Ash, Larry Charles, Mark Curtiss, Larry David, Bryan Gordon, Sam Hefter, Kevin Kelton, Bruce Kirschbaum, Thomas Kramer, Bruce Mahler, Elaine Pope, Fred Raker | September 5, 1980 |
Sketches include "Urban Monster" and "Friday Edition." Eddie Money performs "Running Back" and "Trinidad."
| 14 | 2 | Kim Carnes | none | Steve Adams, Joe Shulkin (head writers), Rod Ash, Larry Charles, Mark Curtiss, Larry David, Bryan Gordon, Sam Hefter, Kevin Kelton, Bruce Kirschbaum, Thomas Kramer, Bruce Mahler, Elaine Pope, Fred Raker | September 12, 1980 |
Sketches include "The Three Stooges: Atomic Bong." Kim Carnes performs "Cry Like a Baby" and "More Love."
| 15 | 3 | The Cars | none | Steve Adams, Joe Shulkin (head writers), Rod Ash, Larry Charles, Mark Curtiss, Larry David, Bryan Gordon, Sam Hefter, Kevin Kelton, Bruce Kirschbaum, Thomas Kramer, Bruce Mahler, Elaine Pope, Fred Raker | September 19, 1980 |
Sketches include "Friday Edition," "Battle Boy," "A Night in Tehran (The Marx Brothers in Iran)," "Drugs R Us," "A Cop with 'Roids," and "Chicken Puppets". The Cars performs "Touch and Go," "Shoo Be Doo" and "Gimme Some Slack."
| 16 | 4 | Al Jarreau | none | Steve Adams, Joe Shulkin (head writers), Rod Ash, Larry Charles, Mark Curtiss, Larry David, Bryan Gordon, Sam Hefter, Kevin Kelton, Bruce Kirschbaum, Thomas Kramer, Bruce Mahler, Elaine Pope, Fred Raker | October 3, 1980 |
Sketches include "Skunkman," "Friday Edition," and "George Bargate: The Jehovah's Witnesses." Al Jarreau performs "Distracted" and "Spain (I Can Recall)."
| 17 | 5 | Split Enz | none | Steve Adams, Joe Shulkin (head writers), Rod Ash, Larry Charles, Mark Curtiss, Larry David, Bryan Gordon, Sam Hefter, Kevin Kelton, Bruce Kirschbaum, Thomas Kramer, Bruce Mahler, Elaine Pope, Fred Raker | October 17, 1980 |
Sketches include "Lunatic In The Kitchen," "Friday Edition" (featuring "Film Review with Larry David" reviewing Private Benjamin), and "Midnite Sermonette with Pastor James Babbett." Split Enz performs "I Got You" and "I Hope I Never."
| 18 | 6 | Ted Nugent | none | Steve Adams, Joe Shulkin (head writers), Rod Ash, Larry Charles, Mark Curtiss, Larry David, Bryan Gordon, Sam Hefter, Kevin Kelton, Bruce Kirschbaum, Thomas Kramer, Bruce Mahler, Elaine Pope, Fred Raker | October 24, 1980 |
Sketches include "Seeking Springsteen's Endorsement," "Dick Goes to Vegas," and "Friday Edition" (featuring Science Correspondent Bruce Mahler). Ted Nugent performs "Paralyzed" and "Scream Dream."
| 19 | 7 | Dire Straits | none | Steve Adams, Joe Shulkin (head writers), Rod Ash, Larry Charles, Mark Curtiss, Larry David, Bryan Gordon, Sam Hefter, Kevin Kelton, Bruce Kirschbaum, Thomas Kramer, Bruce Mahler, Elaine Pope, Fred Raker | October 31, 1980 |
Sketches include "The Great 1980 Debate (a.k.a. Reagan Tries to Be Like Jack Burns)," "White House Exorcist," "Ken the Monster's One-Night Stand," "Friday Edition," "Enter the Matzoi," "1980 Election Commemorative Coins," and "Political Break-Up." Dire Straits performs "Skateaway" and "Romeo & Juliet."
| 20 | 8 | Devo | none | Steve Adams, Joe Shulkin (head writers), Rod Ash, Larry Charles, Mark Curtiss, Larry David, Bryan Gordon, Sam Hefter, Kevin Kelton, Bruce Kirschbaum, Thomas Kramer, Bruce Mahler, Elaine Pope, Fred Raker | November 7, 1980 |
Sketches include "Backstage Cold Open: The Soap Bar," "Reagan Moves Into the White House," "Battle Boy," "Friday Edition" (featuring the Friday Focus Report), "Drugs R' Us: Delivery Girl," "Atrocity at the Retirement House" (Tom Kramer film)", and "The Liberation of Women in Eastern Europe." Devo performs "Whip It" and "Uncontrollable Urge."
| 21 | 9 | The Busboys | none | Steve Adams, Joe Shulkin (head writers), Rod Ash, Larry Charles, Mark Curtiss, Larry David, Bryan Gordon, Sam Hefter, Kevin Kelton, Bruce Kirschbaum, Thomas Kramer, Bruce Mahler, Elaine Pope, Fred Raker | November 14, 1980 |
Sketches include "Star Wars Memories," "Friday Edition," "The Elephant Joke Man," "The Golden Boy Wrestlers: Out at the Bar," "Ice Skating Convicts" (Tom Kramer film), and "The Brotherhood of the Men Who Ho-Hum Between Words". The Busboys performs "KKKay," "Johnny Soul'd Out" and "Minimum Wage."
| 22 | 10 | Heart | none | Steve Adams, Joe Shulkin (head writers), Rod Ash, Larry Charles, Mark Curtiss, Larry David, Bryan Gordon, Sam Hefter, Kevin Kelton, Bruce Kirschbaum, Thomas Kramer, Bruce Mahler, Elaine Pope, Fred Raker | November 21, 1980 |
Sketches include "Dallas: Who shot J. R.?." Heart performs "Bebe le Strange" and "Tell It Like It Is"
| 23 | 11 | Pat Benatar | none | Steve Adams, Joe Shulkin (head writers), Rod Ash, Larry Charles, Mark Curtiss, Larry David, Bryan Gordon, Sam Hefter, Kevin Kelton, Bruce Kirschbaum, Thomas Kramer, Bruce Mahler, Elaine Pope, Fred Raker | December 5, 1980 |
Sketches include "Bruce Mahler's Pirate Song," "Abscam Camera," "Hamlet the Daredevil (a.k.a. Dick The Play Actor)," "Friday Edition (with Maryedith Burrell's Field Report on Drug Dealing on the Sunset Strip)," "The Transphibians at the Pet Store," "The Latin DJ," and "ABC Fridays Fights (a.k.a. Couple's Fight Color Commentary)". Pat Benatar performs "Hit Me With Your Best Shot" and "Hell Is For Children."
| 24 | 12 | Steve Forbert | none | Steve Adams, Joe Shulkin (head writers), Rod Ash, Larry Charles, Mark Curtiss, Larry David, Bryan Gordon, Sam Hefter, Kevin Kelton, Bruce Kirschbaum, Thomas Kramer, Bruce Mahler, Elaine Pope, Fred Raker | December 12, 1980 |
Sketches include "The Ronny Horror Picture Show," "Friday Edition," "Calvin Klein Jeans," "Nat E. Dred: The Rasta Gourmet," and "Square Trees (a.k.a. Prisoner Critiques Daughter's Picture)." Steve Forbert performs "Romeo's Tune," "Lonely Girl" and "Get Well Soon."; NOTE: Reruns of this episode are edited to remove "The Ronny Horror Picture Show" due to the producer of The Rocky Horror Picture Show being against the parody. The sketch is available online, on the best-of DVD set, was on Hulu Plus, and is on Tubi TV.
| 25 | 13 | Rockpile | none | Steve Adams, Joe Shulkin (head writers), Rod Ash, Larry Charles, Mark Curtiss, Larry David, Bryan Gordon, Sam Hefter, Kevin Kelton, Bruce Kirschbaum, Thomas Kramer, Bruce Mahler, Elaine Pope, Fred Raker | December 19, 1980 |
Sketches include "The Three Stooges: The Numb Boys," "Dick: Christmas," "Friday Edition featuring Friday Focus Report: Street Corner Santas," and "Strange Christmas Present." Rockpile performs "A Knife and a Fork" and "Teacher Teacher."
| 26 | 14 | George Thorogood & The Destroyers | George Carlin | Steve Adams, Joe Shulkin (head writers), Rod Ash, Larry Charles, Mark Curtiss, Larry David, Bryan Gordon, Bruce Kirschbaum, Thomas Kramer, Bruce Mahler, Elaine Pope, Fred Raker | January 9, 1981 |
Sketches include "Backstage Cold Open," "1980: A Look Back," "The Life of George Carlin" (Tom Kramer film), George Carlin's standup, "Friday Edition," "K.P.L.O. Radio," "Celebrity Superstunt 1981," "Creative Palm Reading," and "The Western Shop." George Thorogood and the Destroyers performs "I'm Wanted" and "Can't Stop Lovin'."
| 27 | 15 | The Plasmatics | Shelley Winters | Steve Adams, Joe Shulkin (head writers), Rod Ash, Larry Charles, Mark Curtiss, Larry David, Bryan Gordon, Bruce Kirschbaum, Thomas Kramer, Bruce Mahler, Elaine Pope | January 16, 1981 |
Sketches include "Cold Open," "Popeye's Got a Brand New Bag," "Nat E. Dred: The Rasta Gourmet," "Friday Edition," "Draft Lottery Sweepstakes" (Tom Kramer film), a Tom Snyder parody, "Creative Palm Reading II," "Great Medical Discoveries: The Making of Dr. Scholls," and "Frieda Mueller, Art Agent." The Plasmatics performs "Living Dead" and "Butcher Baby."
| 28 | 16 | REO Speedwagon | Henny Youngman | Steve Adams, Joe Shulkin (head writers), Rod Ash, Larry Charles, Mark Curtiss, Larry David, Bryan Gordon, Bruce Kirschbaum, Thomas Kramer, Bruce Mahler, Elaine Pope | January 23, 1981 |
Sketches include "Opening," "That Darn Reagan," "Drugs R' Us," "Friday Edition" (featuring "Film Review with Larry David" reviewing Island of The Wild Babysitters), "Dancing Chickens," "Henny Youngman's Dressing Room," and "El Show de Inez Prado." REO Speedwagon performs "Don't Let Him Go" and "Keep On Loving You"
| 29 | 17 | The Jim Carroll Band | Valerie Bertinelli | Steve Adams, Joe Shulkin (head writers), Rod Ash, Larry Charles, Mark Curtiss, Larry David, Bryan Gordon, Bruce Kirschbaum, Thomas Kramer, Bruce Mahler, Elaine Pope | February 6, 1981 |
Sketches include "The Fridays Cast Meets Valerie Bertinelli", "The Trial of the Network Gang of Three", "The Friday Report (with Maryedith Burrell's Field Report on The Crackdown on Female Mud Activities)", "Howdy Doody Goes to the Movies", "Dick Goes To The New-Wave Barbershop," "Creative Palm Reading", "The Pat Warren Show: Couples' Swatting", "Howdy Doody Gets a Cab", "The Latin DJ", and "The Pothead Family". The Jim Carroll Band performs "People Who Died," "Day & Night," and "It's Too Late."
| 30 | 18 | Kool & the Gang | Michael McKean and David Lander | Steve Adams, Joe Shulkin (head writers), Rod Ash, Larry Charles, Mark Curtiss, Larry David, Bryan Gordon, Bruce Kirschbaum, Thomas Kramer, Bruce Mahler, Elaine Pope | February 13, 1981 |
Sketches include "Backstage Cold Open: Guest Star Confirmation Hearings," "Reagan's Secret Service Agents," "Nat E. Dred: The Rasta Chef," "Friday Edition" featuring Science Correspondent Bruce Mahler, "Rona Barrett Interviews Lenny and Squiggy", "Late-Night Cowboy (a.k.a "The Midnight Cowboy Sitcom"), "Men and Women Who Ho-Hum Between Words," "Latin DJ," "The Frank Sinatra Story" (Tom Kramer film), "The Elevator Sisters: Valentine's Day medley," "The Unprepared Job Applicant," "Film Audition," and "Tomorrow Coast to Coast." Kool & the Gang performs "Celebration," "Take It to the Top" and an instrumental.
| 31 | 19 | Sir Douglas Quintet | Andy Kaufman | Steve Adams, Joe Shulkin (head writers), Rod Ash, Larry Charles, Mark Curtiss, Larry David, Bryan Gordon, Bruce Kirschbaum, Thomas Kramer, Bruce Mahler, Elaine Pope | February 20, 1981 |
Sketches include Andy Kaufman's monologue, "The Moral Majority Comedy-Variety Hour," "The Masked Magician," "Friday Edition" (featuring Andy Kaufman's Thought/Counterthought segment), "Howdy Doody," "The Return of Frankenstein," "Latin DJ," and "The Marijuana Sketch/Onstage Fight-cum-Prank" Sir Douglas Quintet performs "You're Gonna Miss Me," "Mendocino" and "It Was Fun While It Lasted."
| 32 | 20 | Randy Meisner | Billy Crystal | Steve Adams, Joe Shulkin (head writers), Rod Ash, Larry Charles, Mark Curtiss, Larry David, Bryan Gordon, Bruce Kirschbaum, Thomas Kramer, Bruce Mahler, Elaine Pope | February 27, 1981 |
Sketches include "Backstage: Billy Crystal's Bodyguard," "Altered Statesman," "Friday Edition," "Creative Palm Reading III," "That's Meshugge!," "Nat E. Dread: The Rasta Gourmet introduces Randy Meisner," "Andy Kaufman Apologizes for Last Week's Sketch," and "Tom and Delores." Randy Meisner performs "Hearts on Fire" and "Gotta Get Away."
| 33 | 21 | The Marshall Tucker Band | David Steinberg | Steve Adams, Joe Shulkin (head writers), Rod Ash, Larry Charles, Mark Curtiss, Larry David, Bryan Gordon, Bruce Kirschbaum, Thomas Kramer, Bruce Mahler, Elaine Pope | March 13, 1981 |
Sketches include "Backstage Cold Open," "Bing Crosby and Bob Hope in: The Road to El Salvador," "Drugs R' Us: The Security Alarm," "Friday Edition," "Immature Adults," and "The 8th Wonder of the World: The Comedy Genius." The Marshall Tucker Band performs "Heard It in a Love Song" and "This Time I Believe."
| 34 | 22 | Jefferson Starship | Don Novello as Father Guido Sarducci | Steve Adams, Joe Shulkin (head writers), Rod Ash, Larry Charles, Mark Curtiss, Larry David, Bryan Gordon, Bruce Kirschbaum, Thomas Kramer, Bruce Mahler, Elaine Pope | April 3, 1981 |
Sketches include "Father Guido Sarducci & Dawn," "Father Guido Sarducci in: 'A Fistful of Darwin'," "Friday Edition," "The Eyes of The Woodsman," and "Fridays Cast Reflects on Assassinations" Jefferson Starship performs "Find Your Way Back" and "Jane."
| 35 | 23 | Franke and the Knockouts | Madeline Kahn | Steve Adams, Joe Shulkin (head writers), Rod Ash, Larry Charles, Mark Curtiss, Larry David, Bryan Gordon, Bruce Kirschbaum, Thomas Kramer, Bruce Mahler, Elaine Pope | April 10, 1981 |
Sketches include "President Reagan in the Hospital," "The Founding Fathers and the Second Amendment," "Battle Boy," "Friday Edition" (featuring Science Correspondent Bruce Mahler), "The Monster Always Ring Twice," "Fridays 1st Anniversary" (Tom Kramer film), and "Lose The Fish." Franke and the Knockouts performs "Sweetheart" and "Come Back."
| 36 | 24 | Jimmy Buffett | Mark Hamill | Steve Adams, Joe Shulkin (head writers), Rod Ash, Larry Charles, Mark Curtiss, Larry David, Bryan Gordon, Bruce Kirschbaum, Thomas Kramer, Bruce Mahler, Elaine Pope | May 8, 1981 |
Sketches include "Close Encounters of the Third World," "Nat E. Dred: Rastafarian Chef," "Friday Edition" (featuring the Pitkinville Report), "Men Who Hug," "Midnite Sermonette with Pastor James Babbitt," "Just Pull Over," "Dancing Chickens," "Creative Palm Reading IV," "Howdy Doody," and "Make-Out Thoughts". Jimmy Buffett performs "Volcano (Jimmy Buffett song)," "It's My Job," and "Stars Fell on Alabama."
| 37 | 25 | Gary U.S. Bonds | George Hamilton | Steve Adams, Joe Shulkin (head writers), Rod Ash, Larry Charles, Mark Curtiss, Larry David, Bryan Gordon, Bruce Kirschbaum, Thomas Kramer, Bruce Mahler, Elaine Pope | May 15, 1981 |
Sketches include "Backstage Cold Open," "The Three Stooges: Long Lost Brother," "The Elevator Sisters commercial," "Man in The Bushes," "Friday Edition," "Hollywood Party," "The George Hamiltion Story," a Dick Cavett parody, "Repulsé: The Make-Up for Women Who Don't Want Attention," "Howdy Doody," and "Record Co. Audition." Gary U.S. Bonds performs "This Little Girl," "Way Back" and "Jole Blon."

=== Season 3 (1981–82) ===
| No. overall | No. in season | Musical guest(s) | Guest star(s) | Written by | Original release date |
|---|---|---|---|---|---|
| 38 | 1 | The Pretenders | Andy Kaufman | Steve Adams, Joe Shulkin (head writers), Rod Ash, Larry Charles, Mark Curtiss, Larry David, Rich Hall, Bruce Kirschbaum, Thomas Kramer, Bruce Mahler, Elaine Pope, Michael Richards | September 18, 1981 |
Andy Kaufman and Kathie Sullivan sing "Home Again." Sketches include "Drugs R' Us: Space Invaders," "Friday Edition Special Report: How Ronald Reagan Spent His Summer Vacation," "No Hats Allowed" (a.k.a. The Genital Head People), "Friday Edition" (featuring the Friday Focus Report, Tom Kramer short film "Assassin M.D.", & the Pitkinville Report), Howdy Doody, "Andy Kaufman: Who Are You?" "Friday Edition Late Break," "Le Pill commercial," "Latin DJ," and "What's Wrong, Dad?" (a.k.a. A Punk and His Father) Andy Kaufman sings "By and By." The Pretenders performs "The Adultress," "Message of Love" and "Louie, Louie."
| 39 | 2 | Kim Carnes | William Shatner | Steve Adams, Joe Shulkin (head writers), Rod Ash, Larry Charles, Mark Curtiss, Larry David, Rich Hall, Bruce Kirschbaum, Thomas Kramer, Bruce Mahler, Elaine Pope, Michael Richards | September 25, 1981 |
Sketches include "Aborted Star Trek Sketch," "Ron the Ripper," "The Friday Edition," "The Man with a Major Overreaction to Minor Pain/Shatner Contacts Spock," "Friday Short Film: Little Girl Plays Baseball," "Fluffy the Dog Man," and "Friday Edition Special Report: Air Traffic Controller Strike." Kim Carnes performs "Bette Davis' Eyes," "Under My Thumb" and "Miss You Tonight."; NOTE: Reruns of this episode (including versions shown on the Shout Factory DVD, Tubi TV, and Hulu) edit out the brief scene during the "Man with a Major Overreaction to Minor Pain" sketch where Brandis Kemp is knocked on the ground and exposes her thong on-camera.
| 40 | 3 | Devo | Tony Geary and Genie Francis | Steve Adams, Joe Shulkin (head writers), Rod Ash, Larry Charles, Mark Curtiss, Larry David, Rich Hall, Bruce Kirschbaum, Thomas Kramer, Bruce Mahler, Elaine Pope, Michael Richards | October 9, 1981 |
Sketches include "Backstage Soap Opera," "College Soap Opera Addicts/Capitol Hill", "Jerry Salvino for The Organic Hut," "Friday Edition," and "The Transphibians." Devo performs "NuTra Theme," "Jerkin' Back n' Forth," "I Saw Jesus," "Through Being Cool" and "Working in a Coal Mine."
| 41 | 4 | The Stray Cats | Karen Allen | Steve Adams, Joe Shulkin (head writers), Rod Ash, Larry Charles, Mark Curtiss, Larry David, Rich Hall, Bruce Kirschbaum, Thomas Kramer, Bruce Mahler, Elaine Pope, Michael Richards | October 16, 1981 |
Sketches include "Raiders of The Lost Thing," "Tongue No-Stick," "The Apartment With No Fourth Wall," "Friday Edition (featuring Maryedith Burrell's Field Report on Video Technology)," "Rich Hall's Sports Phone," "Latin DJ," "Destroy All Garnishes for Goodness Sake," and "Maryedith Burrell is Dead!" The Stray Cats performs "Rock This Town," "Stray Cat Strut," "Runaway Boys" and "Baby Blue Eyes."
| 42 | 5 | Manhattan Transfer | Marty Feldman | Steve Adams, Joe Shulkin (head writers), Rod Ash, Larry Charles, Mark Curtiss, Larry David, Rich Hall, Bruce Kirschbaum, Thomas Kramer, Bruce Mahler, Elaine Pope, Michael Richards | October 30, 1981 |
Sketches include "Marty parody," "Monster Dearest," "Friday Edition," "Dancing Chickens," "The Praise Satan Club," "Marty Feldman and His Pet Whatchamacallit," "TV Offer from Baputti," "Latin DJ," and "Jack the Shmearer." The Manhattan Transfer performs "Boy From New York City," "Spies In the Night," and "Route 66."
| 43 | 6 | Billy & The Beaters | David Naughton | Steve Adams, Joe Shulkin (head writers), Rod Ash, Larry Charles, Mark Curtiss, Larry David, Rich Hall, Bruce Kirschbaum, Thomas Kramer, Bruce Mahler, Elaine Pope, Michael Richards | November 6, 1981 |
Sketches include "Nightline: Ted Koppel Gets Some Sleep," "David Naughtin's Musical Variety Show," "Nat E. Dred: Rastafarian Gardener", "Friday Edition" (featuring Everyone's Pal, Larry David and Maryedith Burrell's field report on alternative birthing methods), "The Story of Dr. Pepper", "Sadistic Artist," "Backstage Ballet Interview," "Thomas Kramer's The Sumo Wrestler and the Little Boy", "Friday Late Break: NASA Repairs," and "The Latin DJ". Billy & The Beaters performs "Strange Things Happening," "I Can Take Care of Myself" and "Millie, Make Some Chili."
| 44 | 7 | Garland Jeffreys | Jamie Lee Curtis | Steve Adams, Joe Shulkin (head writers), Rod Ash, Larry Charles, Mark Curtiss, Larry David, Rich Hall, Bruce Kirschbaum, Thomas Kramer, Bruce Mahler, Elaine Pope, Michael Richards | November 13, 1981 |
Sketches include "Halitosis" and "Friday Edition." Garland Jeffreys performs "96 Tears," "R.O.C.K." and "35mm Dreams."
| 45 | 8 | Al Jarreau | Shelley Duvall | Steve Adams, Joe Shulkin (head writers), Rod Ash, Larry Charles, Mark Curtiss, Larry David, Rich Hall, Bruce Kirschbaum, Thomas Kramer, Bruce Mahler, Elaine Pope, Michael Richards | November 20, 1981 |
Al Jarreau performs "We're In This Love Together," "Roof Garden" and "Breakin' Away."
| 46 | 9 | King Crimson | Peter Fonda | Steve Adams, Joe Shulkin (head writers), Rod Ash, Larry Charles, Mark Curtiss, Larry David, Rich Hall, Bruce Kirschbaum, Thomas Kramer, Bruce Mahler, Elaine Pope, Michael Richards | December 4, 1981 |
Sketches include "Drugs R' Us," "Friday Edition," "Dancing Chickens," and a repeat of "Little Girl Plays Baseball" (Tom Kramer film). King Crimson performs "Elephant Talk" and "Thela Hun Ginjeet."
| 47 | 10 | The Four Tops | Susan Sarandon | Steve Adams, Joe Shulkin (head writers), Rod Ash, Steve Barker, Larry Charles, Mark Curtiss, Larry David, Rich Hall, Bruce Kirschbaum, Thomas Kramer, Bruce Mahler, Elaine Pope, Michael Richards | December 11, 1981 |
Sketches include "The Tonight Show Starring Johnny Carson," "That Darn Reagan," "Bachelor Living w/Rich Hall," "Friday Edition" (featuring Everyone's Pal, Larry David), "Battle Boy," "Jewish Names," "I Dated a Zombie," "Andy Warhol's TV," and "Basil St. Social Club." The Four Tops performs "When She Was My Girl," "Let Me Set You Free" and a medley of their hits. NOTE: During the "Basil St. Social Club" sketch, Susan Sarandon's character (a prostitute who offers intellectual stimulation to men instead of sexual pleasure) slips up and says that her last customer "blew his wad" all over her instead of "blew his entire conversation" all over her. Most reruns have muted out "blew his wad".
| 48 | 11 | David Grisman | Beau Bridges | Steve Adams, Joe Shulkin (head writers), Rod Ash, Steve Barker, Larry Charles, Mark Curtiss, Larry David, Rich Hall, Bruce Kirschbaum, Thomas Kramer, Bruce Mahler, Elaine Pope, Michael Richards | December 18, 1981 |
Sketches include "Christmastime With Ronnie," "The Osmond Family Hanukkah Special," "Nat E. Dred: Rasta Claus," "The Way We Used to Be," "Friday Edition," "Brooke Shields for Calvin Klein Jeans," "A Classical Get Down," "Three Wise Men," "Frosty the Abominable Snowman," "The Real People's Court," "Our Childhood Christmas," and "Latin DJ." The David Grisman Quartet performs "E.M.D.," "Dawg Funk" and "Dawg's Bowl"
| 49 | 12 | The Cars | Valerie Harper | Steve Adams, Joe Shulkin (head writers), Rod Ash, Steve Barker, Larry Charles, Mark Curtiss, Larry David, Rich Hall, Bruce Kirschbaum, Thomas Kramer, Bruce Mahler, Elaine Pope, Michael Richards, Sam Sandora | January 8, 1982 |
Sketches include "Bruce Mahler's Pirate Song II," "Video Playhouse: A Pattern for Success (a.k.a. The Pacman Play)," "The Teddy Bear Knows Too Much," "Friday Edition Special Report: 1981: Year in Review," "Calvin Klein Jeans II," "Scientist Messing Around," and "Punk Ballet" (Tom Kramer film). The Cars performs "Shake It Up," "Since You're Gone" and "Think It Over."
| 50 | 13 | KISS | Tab Hunter | Steve Adams, Joe Shulkin (head writers), Rod Ash, Steve Barker, Larry Charles, Mark Curtiss, Larry David, Rich Hall, Bruce Kirschbaum, Thomas Kramer, Bruce Mahler, Elaine Pope, Michael Richards, Sam Sandora | January 15, 1982 |
Sketches include "Matzoi: You Should Only Live Twice," "Hollywood Cubes," "Friday Edition," "Bachelor Living with Rich Hall," and "UFO Evidence" (Tom Kramer film). KISS performs "The Oath," "A World Without Heroes" and "I."
| 51 | 14 | Quarterflash | Howard Rollins | Steve Adams, Joe Shulkin (head writers), Rod Ash, Steve Barker, Larry Charles, Mark Curtiss, Larry David, Rich Hall, Bruce Kirschbaum, Thomas Kramer, Bruce Mahler, Elaine Pope, Michael Richards, Sam Sandora | January 22, 1982 |
Sketches include "Amos n' Gandhi," "The Today Show," "Fake Executive," "The Competitors" (Tom Kramer film), "Morgue Prankster," "An Ode to a Tree", "Rich Hall's Sports Phone", and "Three-Generation Fist Fight" Quarterflash performs "Harden My Heart," "Find Another Fool" and "Take Another Picture."; NOTE: In the "Three-Generation Fist Fight" sketch, the fake punch Maryedith Burrell was supposed to give Melanie Chartoff actually connected with her face and broke her tooth.
| 52 | 15 | The Blasters | Bob Balaban | Steve Adams, Joe Shulkin (head writers), Rod Ash, Steve Barker, Larry Charles, Mark Curtiss, Larry David, Rich Hall, Bruce Kirschbaum, Thomas Kramer, Bruce Mahler, Matt Neuman, Elaine Pope, Michael Richards, Sam Sandora | February 5, 1982 |
Sketches include "Professional Rhymer." The Blasters performs "I'm Shaking," "Marie Marie," "American Music," and "So Long Baby Goodbye"
| 53 | 16 | Bill Champlin | Valerie Bertinelli | Steve Adams, Joe Shulkin (head writers), Rod Ash, Steve Barker, Larry Charles, Mark Curtiss, Larry David, Rich Hall, Bruce Kirschbaum, Thomas Kramer, Bruce Mahler, Matt Neuman, Elaine Pope, Michael Richards, Sam Sandora | February 12, 1982 |
Sketches include "Friday Edition" (featuring Rich Hall) and "Kitchen Pot Heads." Bill Champlin performs "Take It Uptown" and "Sara."
| 54 | 17 | Chubby Checker | Victoria Principal | Steve Adams, Joe Shulkin (head writers), Rod Ash, Steve Barker, Larry Charles, Mark Curtiss, Larry David, Rich Hall, Bruce Kirschbaum, Thomas Kramer, Bruce Mahler, Matt Neuman, Elaine Pope, Michael Richards, Sam Sandora | February 19, 1982 |
Sketches include "'Ludeman, The Quaalude-Addicted Superhero" Chubby Checker performs "Running," "Harder Than Diamond" and "Burn Up The Night"
| 55 | 18 | Huey Lewis & the News | Lynn Redgrave | Steve Adams, Joe Shulkin (head writers), Rod Ash, Steve Barker, Larry Charles, Mark Curtiss, Larry David, Rich Hall, Bruce Kirschbaum, Thomas Kramer, Bruce Mahler, Matt Neuman, Elaine Pope, Michael Richards, Sam Sandora | March 5, 1982 |
Sketches include "Experimental Theater." Huey Lewis and the News performs "Workin' for a Livin'," "Do You Believe in Love" and "Giving It All Up for Love."
| 56 | 19 | Bonnie Raitt | Gregory Hines | Steve Adams, Joe Shulkin (head writers), Rod Ash, Steve Barker, Larry Charles, Mark Curtiss, Larry David, Rich Hall, Bruce Kirschbaum, Thomas Kramer, Bruce Mahler, Matt Neuman, Elaine Pope, Michael Richards, Sam Sandora | March 12, 1982 |
Sketches include "Liberace's Big Note Punk Music Book", "The Voluptuous Nurse of Verona" (a.k.a. The Poorly-Dubbed Italian Sex Comedy), "Mister Rogers' Neighborhood In Review," "Gregory's Tap Dance," "Friday Edition," and "Reality Theater." Bonnie Raitt performs "Me and the Boys," "Keep This Heart in Mind" and "Willya Wontcha."
| 57 | 20 | Sister Sledge | Marilu Henner | Steve Adams, Joe Shulkin (head writers), Rod Ash, Steve Barker, Larry Charles, Mark Curtiss, Larry David, Rich Hall, Bruce Kirschbaum, Thomas Kramer, Bruce Mahler, Matt Neuman, Elaine Pope, Michael Richards, Sam Sandora | March 19, 1982 |
Sister Sledge performs "My Guy" and "All The Man I Needed."; NOTE: This episode is the last episode to air as a late-night sketch show. The next episode aired on primetime in ABC's attempt to keep the show on the air at a different timeslot.
| 58 | 21 | Stevie Wonder & Paul McCartney | Tony Geary | Steve Adams, Joe Shulkin (head writers), Rod Ash, Steve Barker, Larry Charles, Mark Curtiss, Larry David, Rich Hall, Bruce Kirschbaum, Thomas Kramer, Bruce Mahler, Matt Neuman, Elaine Pope, Michael Richards, Sam Sandora | April 23, 1982 |
Primetime special. Sketches include "Chariots of Fridays" (Tom Kramer film), "Drugs R' Us," "Friday Edition" (featuring Science Correspondent Bruce Mahler), "Liberace's Third World Special," "William Shatner: Spokesman for The President's Council on Heavy Snoozin," and "Bachelor Living w/Rich Hall." Stevie Wonder & Paul McCartney perform "Ebony & Ivory."; NOTE: This is the last episode of the series overall, and the only episode that aired in primetime.
