= Brandis Kemp =

American actress (1944–2020)

- Born: Sally Kemp; February 1, 1944
- Died: July 4, 2020 (aged 76); Los Angeles, California, U.S.
- Occupation: Actress
- Years active: 1979–2006
- Spouse: Mark Blankfield (m. 1972; div. 1987)

Brandis Kemp, born Sally Kemp (February 1, 1944 – July 4, 2020), was an American actress best known for her appearances in Fridays and AfterMASH from the years 1980 to 1985. She then appeared in a wide variety of films and TV shows as a character actress for the remainder of her career.

== Early life and education ==
She grew up in Palo Alto, California, and attended three colleges: San Jose State College, Stanford University (where she earned a master's degree in drama and literature) and the American Conservatory Theater. She battled dyslexia throughout her school years. After college she spent a year in Hawaii, then to Oregon where she met future Fridays cast member and future husband Mark Blankfield at the Oregon Shakespeare Festival. She then moved to New York for five years. Her first job in New York was teaching speech to policemen and firemen at the John Jay College of Criminal Justice. In 1979 she moved to Los Angeles just before Fridays broke.

== Career ==
=== Theatre ===
She performed onstage in such productions as Meetin' On The Porch (The Canon Theatre), A Man's A Man (La Jolla Playhouse), Look Homeward, Angel (Pasadena Playhouse), Women Behind Bars (Roxy Theatre), Bullshot Crummond (Westwood Playhouse, Coronet Theatre and National Tour) and El Grande de Coca-Cola (Studio One). She worked with the Stanford Repertory Theatre (two seasons) and the Oregon Shakespeare Festival (one season).

=== Fridays ===
Producers of the TV show caught her performances as part of the Low Moan Spectacular comedy troupe in the plays "Bullshot Crummond" and "El Grande de Coca Cola" and selected her as a member of their new ensemble cast.

In 1980, she developed strong comedic recurring characters such as the "Creative Palm Reader" as well as adding her talents to comedy sketches on many levels. She became the "go-to" female cast member because of her flexibility and strong delivery (much like Laraine Newman on Saturday Night Live). She co-starred with Mark Blankfield (to whom she was married until 1987), Jack Burns, Maryedith Burrell, Melanie Chartoff, Larry David, Rich Hall, Darrow Igus, Bruce Mahler, Michael Richards, and John Roarke. The show lasted three seasons, ending in 1982.

=== AfterMASH ===
Producers of the TV show caught her six-month performance in the stage comedy "Women Behind Bars" and liked the character she was playing. She was playing an assistant to the prison matron. It was similar to the Alma Cox character they were creating for the TV show. She started the TV show as an occasionally recurring character but after only four episodes she quickly graduated to a regular cast member because of the popularity of Alma Cox. After the first 13 episodes she appeared in every episode. She appeared with David Ackroyd, Rosalind Chao, William Christopher, Patrick Cranshaw, Jamie Farr, Peter Michael Goetz, Harry Morgan, Anne Pitoniak and Jay O. Sanders. The show completed its run in 1985.

== Death ==
Kemp died at her home in the Los Feliz section of Los Angeles on July 4, 2020, following a struggle with brain cancer and complications from COVID-19 during the COVID-19 pandemic in California. She was 76 years old.

== Filmography ==
Year	Title	Role	Notes
1979	Broadway on Showtime		1 episode
1980	Fridays	Ensemble Cast Member	54 episodes
1982	Remington Steele	Madeline Vickers	1 episode
1983	AfterMASH	Alma Cox	22 episodes
1984	Surf II	Bob's Mother	Film
1984–85	Faerie Tale Theatre	Mama Bear / Nadine Wolf	2 episodes
1986	Welcome To 18	Miss Reba	Film
1986	Scarecrow and Mrs. King		1 episode
1986	Designing Women	Mrs. Boeving	1 episode
1987	Webster	Mrs. Dundorf	1 episode
1987	Perfect Strangers	Claire Hayden	1 episode
1988	South of Reno	Brenda	Film
1988	227	Amy Jo	1 episode
1989	Swimsuit		TV movie
1989	Gross Anatomy	Aunt Rose	Film
1989	The Golden Girls	Maddy	1 episode
1990	Rich Men, Single Women	Mrs. King	TV movie
1990	Coach	Wife	1 episode
1990	The New Lassie	Grace	2 episodes
1992	The Wonder Years	Sales Lady	1 episode
1993	Hexed	Ms. Strickland	Film
1993	A Dangerous Woman	Female Caterer	Film
1993	Grace Under Fire	Nancy	1 episode
1994	Clifford	Woman On Plane	Film
1994	When a Man Loves a Woman	AA Woman #3	Film
1996	Chicago Hope	Mary Byrd	1 episode
1997	ER	Temp Nurse #1	1 episode
1997	The Pretender	Mrs. Simpkins	1 episode
2000	Martial Law	Myra Collins	1 episode
2003	Miracles	Miriam	1 episode
2006	The Theory of Everything	Elaine	TV movie
