= Bullshot =

Bullshot may mean:

- Bullshot (cocktail), a variation of the Bloody Mary
- Bullshot (video games), a portmanteau of bullshit and screenshot referring to the misrepresentation of a final product's technical or artistic quality by artificially enhancing promotional images or video footage
- Bullshot Crummond, a 1974 parody stage play of the British pulp hero Bulldog Drummond
  - Bullshot (film), a 1983 film based on the play
- Bullshot, a 1979 album by rock and roll guitarist Link Wray
