= Mr. St. Nick =

- DVD cover
- Genre: Fantasy comedy
- Teleplay by: Maryedith Burrell; Debra Frank; Steve L. Hayes
- Story by: Maryedith Burrell; Matthew Jacobs
- Directed by: Craig Zisk
- Starring: Kelsey Grammer; Elaine Hendrix; Brian Bedford; Ana Ortiz; Wallace Shawn; Luis Esteban Garcia; Lupe Ontiveros; Charles Durning
- Music by: John Altman
- Country of origin: United States
- Original language: English

Production
- Executive producers: Robert Halmi Sr.; Robert Halmi Jr.
- Producers: Tom Rowe; Mary Anne Waterhouse; Camille Grammer
- Cinematography: David Franco
- Editor: Roger Mattiussi
- Running time: 100 minutes
- Production company: Hallmark Entertainment

Original release
- Network: ABC
- Release: November 17, 2002

Mr. St. Nick is a 2002 American Christmas fantasy comedy television film directed by Craig Zisk and written by Maryedith Burrell, Debra Frank, and Steve L. Hayes, based on a story by Burrell and Matthew Jacobs. It stars Kelsey Grammer as Nick St. Nicholas, the son of Santa Claus. Nick is living a lavish life in Miami, and is reluctant to take over the role of Santa Claus from his retiring father. Elaine Hendrix, Brian Bedford, Ana Ortiz, Wallace Shawn, Luis Esteban Garcia, Lupe Ontiveros, and Charles Durning also star.

Mr. St. Nick was produced by Hallmark Entertainment, and filmed in Vancouver, British Columbia, Canada. It premiered on ABC on November 17, 2002, as an episode of the Wonderful World of Disney anthology series.

== Plot ==
King Nicholas XX has been Santa Claus for 100 years and is now preparing to hand over the baton to his, and the Queen's son, Nick St. Nicholas. Nick is living the high life in Miami and is slightly reluctant to become Santa Claus. Nick's butler Jasper hires a new cook, Lorena. He then gets enticed into portraying a fictitious Santa Claus for a charity (Mr.SaintNick.com) by Heidi and Hector. Nick begins to fall in love with Heidi and asks her to marry him; little does he know that Hector and Heidi are transferring the charity's money into their own account in the Cayman Islands. Soon however, Nick starts to become closer to his loved ones (namely his father) and Nick starts to realize how special being with one's loved ones is. As that happens he also notices that he is getting to know Lorena better and is starting to develop feelings for her as well, which makes him re-think about marrying Heidi. Nick eventually comes to see that he was wrong about everything and chooses Lorena instead.

== Cast ==
- Kelsey Grammer as Nick St. Nicholas / Santa Claus the 21st
- Charles Durning as King Nicholas XX (Santa Claus)
- Katherine Helmond as Queen Carlotta
- Brian Bedford as Jasper
- Elaine Hendrix as Heidi Gardelle
- Ana Ortiz as Lorena
- Wallace Shawn as Mimir
- Luis Esteban Garcia as Hector Villarba
- Lupe Ontiveros as Tia Sophia
- Veena Sood as Mrs. Sarathi

== See also ==
- List of Christmas films
- Santa Claus in film
- List of television films produced for American Broadcasting Company
