= The Alan Thicke Show =

Canadian television daytime talk show

The Alan Thicke Show is a Canadian daytime talk show hosted by Alan Thicke. A replacement for The Alan Hamel Show, which ran from 1976 to 1980, it aired on CTV between 1980 and 1983. During its run, highlights from the week's interviews were edited together for a weekly prime-time series on CTV which aired under the titles Prime Cuts and Fast Company. Thicke left the series in order to launch a US talk show, Thicke of the Night, and was replaced by Don Harron, with the show subsequently retitled The Don Harron Show.
