= Alan Shearman =

American actor (born 1947)

Alan Shearman (born 1947) is an American actor and writer best known for playing the lead in the play Bullshot Crummond and its film adaptation Bullshot.

== Selected filmography ==
=== Theatre ===
- Bullshot Crummond - actor, writer

=== Film ===
Year	Title	Role	Notes
1983	Bullshot	Captain Hugh "Bullshot" Crummond	Also writer
1985	Water	Charlesworth	
1990	The Shrimp on the Barbie	N/A	Writer
2000	2001: A Space Travesty	N/A	Writer
2006	Happy Feet	Elder #2 (voice)	
2010	A Turtle's Tale: Sammy's Adventures	Old Turtle (voice)	
2013	A Turtle's Tale 2: Sammy's Escape from Paradise	Sammy (voice)	
2018	The Son of Bigfoot	Dr. Billingsley (voice)	

=== Television ===
Year	Title	Role	Notes
1999	The Seventh Scroll	N/A	Writer
2004	Teen Titans	Galfore (voice)	Episode: "Betrothed"
2004	Rave Master	Shiba (voice)	
2012	The High Fructose Adventures of Annoying Orange	Heirloom Tomato (voice)	Episode: "Captain Blood Orange"

=== Video games ===
Year	Title	Role	Notes
1993	Living Book Presents: Aesop's Fable - The Tortoise and the Hare	Tortoise	
2005	Rave Master	Outlaw	
2006	Tomb Raider: Legend	Winston Smith	
2008	Tomb Raider: Underworld	Winston Smith	
2009	The Lord of the Rings: Conquest	Officer	
2010	Warhammer 40,000: Dawn of War II – Chaos Rising	Jonah Orion, Weirdboyz	
2011	Warhammer 40,000: Dawn of War II – Retribution	Jonah Orion, Weirdboyz	
2011	Hunted: The Demon's Forge	King, Lord Mayor	
2011	Might & Magic Heroes VI	Istvan Griffin	
2012	Dragon's Dogma	Edmun, Adaro	
