= Monster Farm =

American Animated children's television series

- Genre: Horror comedy
- Created by: Taylor Grant
- Developed by: Taylor Grant; Alex Borstein; Steve Marmel
- Voices of: Robbie Rist; Bruce Mahler; Rodger Bumpass; Kevin Killebrew; Tifanie Christun; Jess Harnell
- Country of origin: United States
- Original language: English
- No. of seasons: 1
- No. of episodes: 13

Production
- Executive producer: Eric S. Rollman
- Producers: Kent Butterworth; Dana Tafoya Cameron; Kyle Jolly
- Production company: Saban Entertainment

Original release
- Network: Fox Family Channel (United States); Fox Kids (International)
- Release: August 15, 1998 – December 28, 1999

Monster Farm is a horror comedy American animated series from Saban Entertainment that aired on Fox Family in the U.S. and Fox Kids on international broadcasts.

It was created and developed for television by Taylor Grant. Alex Borstein and Steve Marmel were brought in to write some of the episodes and aired on one of the channel's animation blocks for one season, from August 15, 1998 to December 28, 1999.

Ownership of the series was passed on to Disney in 2001 when Disney acquired Fox Kids Worldwide, which also includes Saban Entertainment.

26 episodes (52 ten-minute shorts) were produced, but only half of them aired in the United States.

== Plot ==
The series was about a young man from the city named Jack Haylee and the farm he inherits from his great-uncle Harloff. What he finds when he arrives is a bizarre collection of farm animals. Together, this unlikely menagerie must work to help their new owner save their home from the curiosity-seekers who threaten their wacky world.

== Episodes ==
Episode name
Back to the Roots / Tractor Terror: Jack first hears about his inherited farm and meets the monster animals for the first time./The farm's tractor comes to life and goes berserk after being struck by lightning.
Aw, Forget the Whole Thing / Fangs for the Memories: Jack gets hit on the head by a frozen buffalo and gets amnesia, giving Pa an opportunity to claim the farm from him./Count Cluckula leaves the farm to be with vampires, while Goatasarus Rex makes himself leader of the livestock monsters by blackmailing the others with embarrassing secrets.
Bad Heiress Day / Home Office Horrors: Cowapatra finds a scepter that she believes can be used in a ritual to cause sweets to rain down on everyone/Jack ends up getting a gig where he designs and sells software to billionaire Gil Bates, resulting in the monster animals having to take care of chores while Jack focuses on developing the software.
P.S. I Love Ewwwe / Elixir of Chicken: Zombeef falls in love with Dr. Woolly's monstrous alter ego Mr. Ewwe, but Dr. Woolly isn't quite sure he's ready for the married life/Count Cluckula uses a potion invented by Dr. Woolly to become more handsome and have better luck with the ladies.
Working Out is Hard to Do / State of Reunion: Jack tries to get the farm animal monsters to be less lazy and exercise more./Jack goes to his high school reunion.
7 Year Stench / Roommate from Heck: Frankenswine has body odor problems./Count Cluckula kidnaps Jimmy Earl to trick Pa into paying his ransom so he could buy a new TV.
Girl Next Door / Deep Freeze: Pa tries to trick Jack into signing away ownership of the farm using a robot made to look like an attractive woman./A frozen robot double of Jack's great-uncle turns out to have been locked up in a freezer underneath some ice cream bars. Goatasarus Rex accidentally thaws him out and the guy turns out to really be a robot double.
Cry Fowl / Heads Up: The monster animals end up providing hospitality to a chicken monarch of some sort, with Count Cluckula not appreciating how attached their guest has become to him./Frankenswine gets a new head with stylish blond hair, but his new head ends up making him a jerk to the other monster animals, so Frankenswine's old head has to get back on the body.
The Meaning of Life / Bigfoot, Sweetie Baby: Dr. Woolly enjoys a stint as a famous yodeler./A sasquatch movie director offers to make Frankenswine, Zombeef, Cowapatra, Count Cluckula and Goatasarus Rex movie stars, but what's really going on is that a bunch of sasquatches want to eat them.
Fear Itself / It's a Wonderful Farm: The gang have to deal with the ghost of a real estate agent./When Jack tries to make a deposit at the bank, Pa switches his money with bags of mud carried by a construction worker. Jack now dreads what will become of the farm when Pa gets his hands on it.
A Pair of Jacks / Woodstock Willies: Count Cluckula drinks a potion that makes him identical to Jack Haylee and turns the farm into a restaurant./The monster animals try to form a rock band.
Media Circus / Pablum Problem: Two people visit the farm to spy on the monster animals and the monster animals scare them away by putting on a show with various acts (e.g. Frankenswine does weightlifting, Dr. Woolly tries to do the escape artist trick of getting out of a tank of water)./An accident with Dr. Woolly's growth ray causes the monster animals to become babies, leading to Jack having to look after the infants until he can fix the growth ray and turn them back into adults.
Short Circuit Swine / The Trouble with Woolly: Frankenswine gets struck by lightning and gains the ability to repair technology by touching it. Pa takes advantage of it by manipulating Frankenswine into using his powers on his company's equipment./Some guy comes to the farm to work as a butler, his true intentions being to steal Dr. Woolly's calorie-free chocolate spray.

== Characters ==
=== Humans ===
- Jack Haylee (voiced by Robbie Rist) – A human city boy who inherits a farm from his great-uncle.

=== Monster Animals ===
- Count Cluckula (voiced by Bruce Mahler) – A vampire rooster who thinks he is the better leader than anyone else.
- Dr. Woolly and Mr. Ewe (voiced by Bruce Mahler) - A mad scientist sheep who transforms into a monstrous ram whenever he gets wet.
- Frankenswine (voiced by Rodger Bumpass) – A Frankenstein monster pig who is friendly to everyone on the farm.
- Goatasaurus Rex (voiced by Rodger Bumpass) - An educated, fire-breathing goat kaiju who always takes care of his pet, Scarewolf.
- Cowapatra (voiced by Kevin Killebrew) – An Egyptian cow mummy who resides in her tomb-based room.
- Zombeef (voiced by Tifanie Christun) – A zombie cow who is not very bright.
- Scarewolf (voiced by Jess Harnell) - Goatasaurus Rex's pet chihuahua that transforms into a werewolf-like creature when there is a full moon.

== Foreign dubbings ==
The series was dubbed into Brazilian Portuguese with the name Rancho Assombrado (English: "Haunted Ranch"). The Brazilian dub was broadcast in the late nineties as part of the Fox Kids television programming.

The series also aired in Latin America, Hungary, Greece, Germany, Poland, Italy, Romania, and Russia.
