= Michael McManus (American actor) =

American actor (born 1946)

- Born: January 26, 1946 (age 80); Minneapolis, Minnesota, U.S.
- Occupations: Actor, writer, producer
- Years active: 1975–2001

Michael McManus (born January 26, 1946) is an American actor, writer, and producer. His best known movie role is perhaps Ben Tuthill in the 1982 film Poltergeist. He has had roles in the films Mother, Jugs & Speed, Police Academy 4: Citizens on Patrol, Funland and Action Jackson and guest starred in TV series including M*A*S*H, Laverne & Shirley, Rhoda, The Six Million Dollar Man, Dallas, Happy Days, Night Court, Knight Rider, and The Golden Girls. He won a Writers Guild of America Award in 1982 for Steve Martin's All Commercials...A Steve Martin Special for "Best Variety, Musical, or Comedy."

== Career ==
McManus was a series regular on the television sitcom Lewis & Clark as John, the bartender; the series lasted only one season of thirteen episodes. He also guest starred in a number of popular television series including Mr. Belvedere, Growing Pains, Newhart, Full House, Alice, Diff'rent Strokes. Webster, Hunter, Married... with Children, and Columbo, among others. In 1989, he had a recurring role as Sid Wilson on the first season of Baywatch. McManus' last known screen acting appearance was in a 2001 episode of According to Jim.

He has also worked behind the camera, most notably as the producer and writer of the crime comedy film Mafia!, writer of All Commercials...A Steve Martin Special, and as producer of Hot Shots! Part Deux.

== Filmography ==
Year	Title	Role	Notes
1975	When Things Were Rotten	Guy Tinker	
1976	Mother, Jugs & Speed	Walker	
1976	Monster Squad	Allegro	
1976	Rhoda	Herb Buck	
1976	Gemini Many	Moose	
1976–1977	Laverne and Shirley	Herb Prange	
1977	M*A*S*H	Sgt. Ames	
1977	Smokey and the Bandit	Trucker 'Silver Tongued Devil'	
1977	The World's Greatest Lover	Yes Man #5	
1977	The Kentucky Fried Movie	Hornung	(segment "Courtroom")
1978	The Six Million Dollar Man	Guard Sims	
1978	A Wild and Crazy Guy	Self	
1978	Family	Mr. Lemon	
1979	Dallas	Matt	
1981	Marie	Writer	
1981	Happy Days	Sheriff	
1981	All Commercials...A Steve Martin Special	Writer	
1981	Happy Days	Sheriff	
1981–1982	Lewis & Clark	John	
1982	Poltergeist	Ben Tuthill	
1982	Twilight Theater II	Writer	
1983	Dempsey	Babe Ruth	
1983–1984	Thicke of the Night	Regular cast member	
1984	Remington Steele	Ralph Kelsey	
1985	Moving Violations	Farmer #1	
1985	Head Office	Branch Kipp	
1985	Alice	Charlie	
1985	Knight Rider	Danny "Rooster" Roskovich	
1985	Diff'rent Strokes	Cal	
1986	Mr. Bill's Real Life Adventures	Sluggo	
1987–1988	Webster	Calvin Berke	
1987	Police Academy 4: Citizens on Patrol	Todd	
1987	Funland	T. G. Hurley	
1988	Action Jackson	Lionel Grantham	
1988–1989	Night Court	Dr. Gordon Mooney	
1989	Hunter	Lou Mason	
1989	The Golden Girls	Sid LaBass	
1989	Baywatch	Sid LaBass	
1990	Married... with Children	Puggy	
1990	Saved by the Bell	Mr. Manfredi	
1990	Doogie Howser, M.D.	Roy Lester	
1990	Coach	Hoyt	
1991	Shannon's Deal	Bruce	
1991	Step by Step	Papa Larson	
1992	Delta	Roy	
1992	Dear John	Bruce	
1993	Hot Shots! Part Deux	Producer	
1998	Mafia!	Writer/Producer	
2001	According to Jim	Ben	
