= Funland (film) =

- VHS cover
- Directed by: Michael A. Simpson
- Screenplay by: Michael A. Simpson; Bonnie Turner; Terry Turner
- Story by: Michael A. Simpson
- Starring: William Windom; David L. Lander; Bruce Mahler; Jill Carroll; Clark Brandon; Robert Sacchi; Michael McManus; Mary Beth McDonough; Terry Beaver; Richard Reiner; Jan Hooks; Lane Davies
- Cinematography: William VanDerKloot
- Edited by: William VanDerKloot; Wade Watkins
- Music by: James Oliverio
- Distributed by: Double Helix Films; RMC Films
- Release date: October 1987
- Running time: 98 minutes
- Country: United States
- Language: English

Funland is a 1987 American dark comedy film directed by Michael A. Simpson, who co-wrote the screenplay with Bonnie and Terry Turner. It follows a disgruntled clown who takes revenge on the staff of an amusement park who fired him. It was filmed at Six Flags Over Georgia in Austell, Georgia.

== Plot ==
Funland is a family-oriented amusement park owned by the eccentric Angus Perry. Niel Stickney, the clown mascot, is both one of the founders of the park and its former accountant. Niel has suffered a nervous breakdown and his grip on reality is slowly deteriorating.

After the mob kills Angus and takes over the park, Stickney begins to have increasingly bizarre hallucinations, including envisioning the patrons of the park cafeteria spontaneously breaking into song and dance, and seeing visions of the dead Angus. He then begins to believe himself to be his clown persona, Bruce Burger.

After the new mafia management fires him, he finally snaps. He steals a briefcase containing a rifle, intending to kill his replacement and reclaim the theme park. While firing the gun, the two sons of the mob boss recognize the sound and investigate. Bruce then shoots and kills one of them in self defense. The film ends with Neil Stickney (Bruce Burger) owning and running the park.

== Cast ==
- William Windom as Angus Perry
- David L. Lander as Niel Stickney/Bruce Burger
- Bruce Mahler as Mike Spencer
- Robert Sacchi as Mario DiMauro
- Clark Brandon as Doug Sutterfield
- Jill Carroll as Denise Wilson
- Michael McManus as T. G. Hurley
- Mary Beth McDonough as Kristin Cumming
- Terry Beaver as Carl DiMauro
- Lane Davies as Chad Peller
- Richard Reiner as Larry DiMauro
- Bonnie Turner as Darlene Dorkner
- Jan Hooks as Shelly Willingham
- Randal Patrick as Chip Cox
- Gene Murrell as Randy Grossman

== Production ==
The film was shot in Autumn of 1985.

== Release ==
Funland had its premiere at the Cannes Film Festival on May 13, 1987. The film was released in the United States on June 1, 1988.

Funland had its release on home video on February 7, 1990.

It was released on LaserDisc, VHS and, in 2004, DVD.
