= The Little Match Girl (1987 film) =

- Written by: Maryedith Burrell
- Directed by: Michael Lindsay-Hogg
- Starring: Keshia Knight Pulliam; Rue McClanahan; William Daniels
- Music by: John Morris
- Country of origin: United States
- Original language: English

Production
- Producer: Robert Hargrove
- Cinematography: Kenneth MacMillan
- Running time: 96 minutes
- Production company: NBC Productions

Original release
- Network: NBC
- Release: December 21, 1987

The Little Match Girl is an American television film that is based on the 1845 short story of the same name by Hans Christian Andersen. This adaptation reset Anderson's story within 1920s New England, and premiered on NBC on December 21 , 1987. The film was developed as a starring vehicle for Keshia Knight Pulliam who plays the title character. Directed by Michael Lindsay-Hogg, the work used a screenplay created by Maryedith Burrell. The film used music by composer John Morris, special effects by Dave Gauthier, and cinematography by Kenneth MacMillan. It was produced by Robert Hargrove and had a running time of 96 minutes.

== Synopsis ==
Setting: 1920s New England

Frances Dutton, a kind-hearted but sad woman, and her wealthy but hard-hearted husband, Haywood Dutton, are having problems in their marriage. Their daughter Lindsay's selfishness and entitled behavior is making her miserable. Frances and Haywood are estranged from their son Neville who lives a life of debauchery, and from their son Joe, whose rift with his Protestant parents stems from their disapproval of his marriage five years previously to the Catholic girl Mary-Margaret. Joe is a progressive newspaper editor who writes scathing pieces about his father's business practices in his newspaper. The rift between father and sons is widened further by the scheming behavior of the corrupt Police Chief Murphy who benefits politically from the rift.

Meanwhile, Molly, a homeless African-American orphan girl, is having her own challenges surviving on the streets. A photographer captures her on camera selling matches in a condemned housing area owned by the Haywood Dutton and she ends up appearing in the local newspaper in a story written by Joe in which he criticizes his father for evicting poor people from their homes on Christmas Eve. Neville finds Molly and brings her home to his parents on Christmas day in the hopes of upsetting his parents. The joy she brings into their lives as well as some matches and magic changes the Dutton family and brings hope and reconciliation within Haywood and Frances's marriage and within their relationships with their children. All problems resolve happily in the end.

== Cast ==
- Keshia Knight Pulliam as Molly
- William Daniels as Haywood Dutton
- John Rhys-Davies as Police Chief Murphy
- Jim Metzler as Joseph Dutton
- William Youmans as Neville Dutton
- Hallie Foote as Mary-Margaret Dutton
- Maryedith Burrell as Rita
- Rue McClanahan as Frances Dutton
- Robyn Stevan as Lindsay Dutton

== Reception ==
While the film received a mixed reception from critics, it was successful in its television ratings. In her review in The New York Times', Eden Ross Lipson described the film as "lugubrious and predictable" and felt the story was more akin in its aesthetic to the musical Annie than it was to Andersen's original story. However, she acknowledged that "the grade-school crowd, who watched it on video-cassette without commercial interruptions, thought it was a winner." Film historian Donald Bogle described the film as "sentimental, hokey, and devoid of any reality", and pointed out that "no one seemed to question what this little Black child is doing in this place that seems so lily-white."
