= Thicke of the Night =

American late-night talk show

- Genre: Late-night; Talk show; Variety show
- Created by: Alan Thicke
- Presented by: Alan Thicke
- Starring: Richard Belzer; Arsenio Hall; Rick Ducommun; Charles Fleischer; Gilbert Gottfried; Michael McManus; Chloe Webb; Fred Willard; Gloria Loring
- Announcer: Charlie Tuna
- Music by: Tom Canning (bandleader), Jeff Tobin (bandleader)
- Opening theme: "Thicke of the Night"
- Composers: Alan Thicke; David Foster; Jay Graydon
- Country of origin: United States
- Original language: English
- No. of seasons: 1

Production
- Executive producer: Fred Silverman
- Running time: 90 minutes
- Production companies: InterMedia Entertainment Company; Thickovit Productions Inc.; Metromedia Producers Corporation; MGM Television

Original release
- Network: First-run syndication
- Release: September 5, 1983 – June 15, 1984

Thicke of the Night is an American late-night talk show hosted by Alan Thicke that aired in first-run syndication during the 1983–84 television season. Produced as an alternative to NBC's The Tonight Show Starring Johnny Carson, the program premiered in September 1983 and combined celebrity interviews and musical performances with comedy sketches and a recurring ensemble of performers.

Thicke had previously hosted the Canadian daytime talk show The Alan Thicke Show. Regular performers on Thicke of the Night included Richard Belzer, Arsenio Hall, Rick Ducommun, Charles Fleischer, Gilbert Gottfried, Michael McManus, Chloe Webb and Fred Willard. Charlie Tuna served as announcer, and Tom Canning initially led the house band.

The series received poor reviews and low ratings against Carson and was canceled after one season.

The show was produced by MGM Television in association with Metromedia, distributed in syndication by MGM/UA Television Distribution

== Background and launch ==
Before Thicke of the Night, Alan Thicke had hosted The Alan Thicke Show, a successful daytime talk show in Canada. In 1983, producer Fred Silverman recruited Thicke to host a syndicated late-night program intended to compete with NBC's The Tonight Show Starring Johnny Carson.

The series was sold in first-run syndication rather than through a television network and was cleared by more than 100 stations before its premiere. It debuted on September 5, 1983.

The program was designed as a broader entertainment show than Carson's, combining Thicke's monologue and celebrity interviews with musical performances, comedy sketches and a recurring ensemble of comic performers. Thicke said before the launch that the show would draw freely from earlier talk-show formats rather than attempt to reinvent the genre.

== Format and cast ==
Unlike most late-night talk shows of the period, Thicke of the Night emphasized comedy sketches and recurring performers in addition to celebrity interviews and musical guests. Thicke was joined by an ensemble cast that included Richard Belzer, Arsenio Hall, Rick Ducommun, Charles Fleischer, Gilbert Gottfried, Michael McManus, Chloe Webb, Fred Willard, Isabel Grandin, Alvernette Jimenez and Tamara Champlin.

Charlie Tuna served as the program's announcer. Tom Canning led the original house band, which was later replaced by a band led by Jeff Tobin as part of a mid-season retooling.

The program also featured musical performances by contemporary artists. A March 1984 episode included the network television debut of the Red Hot Chili Peppers, who performed two songs from their debut album.

== Retooling and cancellation ==
Thicke of the Night struggled to attract viewers against The Tonight Show Starring Johnny Carson and received generally unfavorable reviews from television critics. Several stations dropped the program during the season, prompting a mid-season retooling.

The revised format placed greater emphasis on celebrity interviews and reduced the use of comedy sketches and the ensemble cast. Thicke's wife, singer Gloria Loring, joined the program, while Los Angeles television host Wally George made recurring appearances. The house band was also replaced during the retooling.

The changes failed to improve the show's performance, and it was canceled at the end of its only season. In a later interview, Thicke reflected on the series by saying, "Thicke of the Night was supposed to challenge Johnny Carson. They said it couldn't be done and I was the guy they chose to prove it. The show was ahead of its time ... it should've been on in 2084, when all of us are dead."

Shortly after the series ended, Loring filed for divorce from Thicke on June 28, 1984, citing irreconcilable differences. The couple had separated the previous May.

== Reception and legacy ==
Thicke of the Night received largely negative reviews. Critics questioned Thicke's suitability as a late-night host and criticized the program's heavily promoted mixture of interviews, musical performances and sketch comedy. Thicke later said that the reviews had affected both him and his family and that he sometimes felt embarrassed to appear in public.

The series averaged a 1.0 Nielsen rating, compared with 6.6 for The Tonight Show Starring Johnny Carson during the same period. It was canceled in 1984. Thicke later joked that he did not want the program to be the only thing for which he was remembered.

The program gave Arsenio Hall early national exposure as a regular performer. Hall later became the host of the successful syndicated series The Arsenio Hall Show. The show also presented early national television appearances by Los Angeles musical acts including the Red Hot Chili Peppers and Oingo Boingo.

After the cancellation, Thicke returned to writing and producing before being cast as Jason Seaver in the ABC sitcom Growing Pains in 1985. The role established him as a television actor in the United States and became the work for which he was best known.

The program was parodied by SCTV in the November 1983 sketch "Maudlin O' the Night". The sketch recast Joe Flaherty's Sammy Maudlin character in a format resembling Thicke of the Night, satirizing its crowded set and ensemble of resident comic performers.

== See also ==
- List of late-night American network TV programs
