= Fridays (TV series) =

American late-night sketch comedy series (1980–1982)

- Created by: Bill Lee; John Moffitt
- Directed by: Bob Bowker; Tom Kramer; Paul Miller; John Moffitt
- Starring: Mark Blankfield; Maryedith Burrell; Melanie Chartoff; Larry David; Rich Hall; Darrow Igus; Brandis Kemp; Bruce Mahler; Michael Richards; John Roarke
- Narrated by: Jack Burns
- Country of origin: United States
- Original language: English
- No. of seasons: 3
- No. of episodes: 58 (list of episodes)

Production
- Producers: Jack Burns; Bill Lee; Pat Tourk Lee; John Moffitt
- Running time: 70–90 minutes
- Production company: Moffitt-Lee Productions

Original release
- Network: ABC
- Release: April 11, 1980 – April 23, 1982

Fridays is an American late-night live comedy show that aired on ABC on Friday nights from April 11, 1980, to April 23, 1982.

== Overview ==
The program was ABC's attempt to duplicate the success of NBC's Saturday Night Live, which, at the time, was in its fifth season. Like SNL, Fridays featured popular musical guests and, beginning in the second season, celebrity guest hosts, some of whom had appeared on SNL before and after Fridays aired, such as Andy Kaufman, Billy Crystal, William Shatner, Mark Hamill, and George Carlin. (Carlin, who had hosted the very first SNL in 1975, was also Fridays' first official "guest host" in 1981.)

The show featured many recurring characters and sketches, short films, and a parody news segment called Friday Edition, with Melanie Chartoff as the anchor (later joined by Rich Hall in seasons two and three). Veteran comedian Jack Burns served as show announcer and made on-screen appearances on the show. Initially, the show was compared unfavorably to Saturday Night Live as a weak clone that resorted to shock humor for laughs. The third episode (original airdate: April 25, 1980) was the last episode to air on some affiliates due to objectionable content concerning zombie gore and cannibalism ("Diner of the Living Dead"), disgusting habits ("Women Who Spit"), and blasphemous humor ("The Inflatable Nun").

When Saturday Night Live's sixth season was met with negative reviews and low ratings over the new cast, new writers, and new showrunner Jean Doumanian, critics who once panned Fridays praised it, citing the show as being sharper, edgier and funnier than Saturday Night Live at the time. Some critics attributed this to the sprawling, ambitious, and often pointed sociopolitical and situational sketches.

Some examples of this include:

- A Bing Crosby-Bob Hope buddy comedy parody about the United States' dealings with El Salvador ("Road to El Salvador");
- A Close Encounters of the Third Kind parody about refugees from an impoverished Central American country mistaking a Playboy magazine location scout and an American military invasion for extraterrestrials coming to save them ("Close Encounters of the Third World");
- A Marx Brothers parody of Iran's revolution ("A Night in Tehran");
- Palestinian radio DJs (played by Bruce Mahler and episode guest star George Carlin) broadcasting a morning show from a PLO bunker ("K.P.L.O");
- A live-action Robert Altman Popeye film parody with Popeye (Mark Blankfield) and a band of first-wave hippies fighting back against a fascist regime led by Bluto ("Popeye's Got a Brand New Bag");
- The US Founding Fathers worrying that the Second Amendment ("The Right to Bear Arms") will be abused in the future while ignoring suggestions for amendments granting equal rights to women and African-Americans;
- A variety show run by the Moral Majority featuring a magician who makes minorities disappear, a top ten list of things the Moral Majority hate, and a punk band performing bowdlerized hits for conservatives ("The Moral Majority Comedy Hour");
- A parody of Altered States where Ronald Reagan (John Roarke) uses sensory deprivation and psychedelic mushrooms to find a way to bring America back to its glory days, but ends up transforming himself into Richard Nixon ("Altered Statesman");
- A spaghetti western centered on the creationism vs. evolution argument featuring Don Novello as Father Guido Sarducci ("A Fist Full of Darwin"), and,
- In what is considered the show's magnum opus, a 17-minute parody of The Rocky Horror Picture Show with Ronald Reagan (John Roarke) as Tim Curry's Dr. Frank N. Furter creating the perfect Republican, who turns out to be a militant black man who leads Reagan's followers in a revolution.

Unusual for a sketch comedy series at the time, Fridays occasionally featured serious interludes and dramatic sketches, such as a segment that aired soon after the 1981 assassination attempt on Ronald Reagan involving all nine of the cast members recalling where they were at the time of previous assassinations and attempts and a sketch where a punk rocker (Michael Richards) visits his father (John Roarke) who rejects him by yelling, "Who are you?" and "I have no son!". After a long, heartfelt speech from the punk about how his father should accept that he is from a different generation and learn to love him, the punk discovers that the old man was right: they aren't father and son because they have different hair and eye colors.

From its inception, Fridays embraced the emerging new wave rock music scene and its associated culture to a greater extent than Saturday Night Live did at the time, widely incorporating it into their selection of musical guests, hosts and sketches. Unlike Saturday Night Live, Fridays did not have a show band on set. Pop art drawings were displayed and accompanied with a fuzz heavy electric guitar solo whenever the show went to and came back from commercial breaks, though season one featured cartoons by B. Kliban with some kind of pun as the punchline.

Three seasons of Fridays aired on ABC (see § Episodes). The last episode aired as a primetime sketch show. The show was originally 70 minutes in its first season. It was expanded to 90 minutes in seasons two and three.

SNL executive producer Dick Ebersol gave all Fridays cast members an offer to join Saturday Night Live in 1982, but most turned him down. Only Larry David, Kevin Kelton and Rich Hall worked on SNL for a short time after Fridays was completed (all of them worked on Saturday Night Live during its tenth season in 1984; Hall was a cast member while David and Kelton were writers).

== Directors ==
Directors of Fridays include:

- Bob Bowker
- Tom Kramer
- Paul Miller
- John Moffitt

== Producers ==
Producers of Fridays include:

- Jack Burns
- Bill Lee
- Pat Tourk Lee
- John Moffitt

== Writers ==
The writing staff of Fridays consisted of:

- Steve Adams (all episodes: writer, season 1; credited as head writer, along with Joe Shulkin, for seasons 2 and 3)
- Rod Ash (beginning midway through season 1, through season 3)
- Steve Barker (last half of season 3)
- Jack Burns (script supervisor/creative consultant only)
- Larry Charles (all episodes)
- Mark Curtiss (seasons 2 and 3)
- Larry David (seasons 2 and 3)
- Bryan Gordon (seasons 1 and 2)
- Rich Hall (season 3)
- Sam Hefter (season 1 and first half of season 2)
- Kevin Kelton (first half of season 2 only)
- Bruce Kirschbaum (all episodes)
- Tom Kramer (occasional filmed segments, seasons 1-3)
- Bruce Mahler (season 3)
- Matt Neuman (last third of season 3)
- Elaine Pope (all episodes)
- Fred Raker (season 1, and the first half of season 2)
- Michael Richards (season 3)
- Sam Sandora (last half of season 3)
- Joe Shulkin (all episodes: writer, season 1; credited as head writer, along with Steve Adams, for seasons 2 and 3)

== Performers ==
Main cast, guest stars and musical guests on Fridays include:

=== Main cast ===
- Mark Blankfield
- Maryedith Burrell
- Melanie Chartoff
- Larry David
- Rich Hall
- Darrow Igus
- Brandis Kemp
- Bruce Mahler
- Michael Richards
- John Roarke

=== Guest stars (seasons 2 and 3) ===
- Karen Allen
- Bob Balaban
- Valerie Bertinelli
- Beau Bridges
- George Carlin
- Billy Crystal
- Jamie Lee Curtis
- Shelley Duvall
- Marty Feldman
- Peter Fonda
- Genie Francis
- Anthony Geary
- Mark Hamill
- George Hamilton
- Valerie Harper
- Marilu Henner
- Gregory Hines
- Tab Hunter
- Madeline Kahn
- Andy Kaufman
- David L. Lander
- Michael McKean
- David Naughton
- Don Novello
- Victoria Principal
- Lynn Redgrave
- Howard E. Rollins Jr.
- Susan Sarandon
- William Shatner
- Brooke Shields
- David Steinberg
- Shelley Winters
- Henny Youngman

=== Musical guests ===
- AC/DC
- The Beach Boys
- Pat Benatar
- The Blasters
- Gary U.S. Bonds
- The Boomtown Rats
- Jack Bruce and Friends
- Jimmy Buffett and the Coral Reefer Band
- The Busboys
- Kim Carnes
- Jim Carroll
- The Cars
- Bill Champlin
- Chubby Checker
- The Clash
- Bruce Cockburn
- Devo
- Dire Straits
- The Eagles
- Steve Forbert
- The Four Tops
- Franke and the Knockouts
- Rory Gallagher
- David Grisman Quintet
- Heart
- Ian Hunter with Ellen Foley and Mick Ronson
- The Jam
- Al Jarreau
- Jefferson Starship
- Garland Jeffreys
- Journey
- King Crimson
- Kiss
- Kool & the Gang
- Huey Lewis and the News
- Kenny Loggins
- The Manhattan Transfer
- The Marshall Tucker Band
- Paul McCartney
- Randy Meisner and the Silverados
- Eddie Money
- Ted Nugent
- Graham Parker and The Rumour
- Tom Petty and the Heartbreakers
- The Plasmatics
- The Pretenders
- Quarterflash
- Bonnie Raitt
- REO Speedwagon
- Rockpile
- Boz Scaggs
- Scandal
- Sir Douglas Quintet
- Sister Sledge
- Split Enz
- The Stray Cats
- George Thorogood and the Destroyers
- The Tubes
- Billy Vera and The Beaters
- Stevie Wonder
- Warren Zevon
- Tommy Tutone

AC/DC, The Clash and The Stray Cats made their American television debuts on Fridays. At the time of The Stray Cats' appearance, the band had yet to be signed by a record company. During the group's performance, there was a crawl at the bottom of the screen inviting offers from record companies.

== Episodes ==
Season	Episodes	Originally released	
Season	Episodes	First released	Last released
1	12	April 11, 1980	July 18, 1980
2	25	September 5, 1980	May 15, 1981
3	21	September 18, 1981	April 23, 1982

=== Andy Kaufman incident ===
On the February 20, 1981, episode, Andy Kaufman was the host. During a sketch about couples at dinner sneaking away to the bathroom to smoke marijuana, Kaufman, who was known for causing trouble on live television, broke character and refused to read his lines (saying "I can't play stoned"). Michael Richards got up from the table, grabbed the cue cards and threw them down on the table in front of Kaufman, who responded by splashing a glass of water on Richards' face. Some of the show's cast and crew members (including Richards and Burns) became angry and a small brawl broke out on stage. Since the show was broadcast live, home viewers were able to see most of these events transpire until the network cut the cameras off. Kaufman returned the following week in a taped apology to home viewers. The incident was planned by Kaufman, who concocted it with his sidekick Bob Zmuda, and was meant as a prank. The only individuals aware of the plan were producer/director Moffitt, producer/announcer Burns, and the three comedians acting in the sketch along with Kaufman: Richards, Chartoff and Burrell. This incident was reenacted in the film Man on the Moon (1999), starring Jim Carrey as Kaufman, Zmuda as Burns, Norm Macdonald as Richards, Caroline Rhea as Chartoff and Mary Lynn Rajskub as Burrell.

=== Cancellation ===
The series ended in 1982 following ABC's decision to expand Nightline to five nights a week, which moved Fridays to air at midnight instead of 11:30pm. This lasted from January through April 1982, after which the show was dropped from ABC's schedule.

One final attempt was made by ABC to revive the show by putting it on in prime time, about a month after its final late-night broadcast. The sole prime-time episode of Fridays (broadcast on April 23, 1982) was scheduled against Dallas, which did nothing to help the show's moribund ratings. The series was promptly canceled.

== Syndication and DVD release ==
A few years after the show's cancellation, Fridays appeared in reruns on the USA Network in the late 1980s. However, the episodes were edited down to 60 minutes (similar to how Saturday Night Live is edited on cable reruns and NBC reruns that air at 10pm EST as filler). The reruns were pulled after a year.

"A DVD release, said producer John Moffitt, was delayed because Richards' original contract gave him video approval rights and because David for years asked that the show not be made available because he was uncomfortable with the quality of his work."

"According to Perrin, for many years a DVD edition of Fridays was blocked by Larry David, but finally a 4-disc set was released in 2013."

For some time, a home video release of Fridays was considered out of the question, as cast member Michael Richards was said to have signed a deal stating that no episode would be released on any home video format. However, clips of sketches from the show (mostly sketches that featured Richards or David) surfaced on the Seinfeld season three DVD set in the bonus features set. Shout Factory announced plans to release all three seasons of the show on DVD in 2013. In August 2013, after missing their original release date, Shout Factory released a five disc best-of collection featuring highlights of 16 episodes from seasons one through three (not complete episodes). In 2015, Hulu Plus streamed select episodes from all three seasons (season one has episodes 1, 3, 8, and 10; season 2 has episodes 3, 7, 8, 9, 11, 12, 19, and 20; and season three has episodes 2, 4, 12, and 13). As of 2017, the show is no longer streaming on Hulu Plus, but the best-of DVD collection is still available for purchase, and the show's episodes (which include the Hulu episodes and some episodes that weren't featured on Hulu) can be streamed on Tubi TV and Shout! Factory. As of April 2025, Season 1 of Fridays is available to stream, with ads, on Amazon Prime Video, while Freevee has four episodes (episodes one, two, three, and ten from season one) available.

== Legacy ==
Larry Charles, Larry David, Michael Richards, and Bruce Mahler later worked on Seinfeld, while Melanie Chartoff became known for voicing Tommy Pickles' mom, Didi, and grandmother, Minka, on the original 1990s version of Rugrats.
