= South of Reno =

Film

- Directed by: Mark Rezyka
- Written by: T.L. Lankford; Mark Rezyka
- Produced by: Robert Tinnell
- Starring: Jeff Osterhage; Lisa Blount; Lewis Van Bergen; Joe Estevez; Julia Montgomery; Brandis Kemp; Danitza Kingsley; Bert Remsen
- Cinematography: Bernard Auroux
- Edited by: Marc Grossman
- Music by: Nigel Holton; Clive Wright
- Release date: 1988
- Running time: 97 minutes
- Country: United States
- Language: English

South of Reno is a 1988 American drama film directed by Mark Rezyka and starring Jeff Osterhage, Lisa Blount, Lewis Van Bergen, Joe Estevez, Julia Montgomery, Brandis Kemp, Danitza Kingsley and Bert Remsen. It is Rezyka's directorial debut.

== Cast ==
- Jeff Osterhage as Martin Clark
- Lisa Blount as Anette Clark
- Joe Estevez as Hector
- Lewis Van Bergen as Willard
- Julia Montgomery as Susan
- Danitza Kingsley as Louise
- Brandis Kemp as Brenda
- Bert Remsen as Howard Stone
- Mary Grace Canfield as Motel Manager
- Billy Bob Thornton as Counterman
- Jason Ronard as Trucker #1
- Duane Tucker as Trucker #2

== Reception ==
Leonard Maltin awarded the film two and a half stars.
