= Kevin Kelton =

American television writer and producer (born 1956)

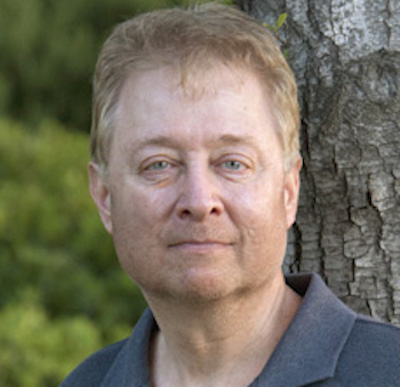
- Website: www.kevinkelton.com

Kevin Kelton is an American author and television writer-producer whose credits include Night Court, Boy Meets World and other network series. Kelton is the younger brother of the comedian Bobby Kelton,

== Television ==
Kelton's first TV writing job was on the syndicated game show Face the Music. He went on to write for a string of sketch comedy series before being hired by Saturday Night Live as a staff writer at the beginning of the 1983–84 season. During this time, the writing staff earned an Emmy nomination.

== Credits ==
- Face the Music – syndicated (staff writer, 1980)
- Fridays! – ABC (staff writer, 1980)
- Steve Martin's Twilight Theatre – NBC (staff writer, 1982)
- Laff Trax – syndicated (staff writer, 1982)
- No Soap, Radio – ABC (staff writer, 1982)
- The Jeffersons – CBS (story by, 1983)
- Saturday Night Live – (staff writer, 1983–1985)
- Comedy Break with Mack and Jamie – syndicated (staff writer, 1985–1986)
- The Jay Leno Special – NBC (staff writer, 1986)
- Women in Prison – FOX (staff writer, 1987–1988)
- A Different World – NBC (Executive Story Editor, 1989–1990)
- Night Court – NBC (Producer, 1990–1992)
- Shaky Ground – FOX (Producer, 1992–1993)
- Townsend Television – FOX (writer, 1994)
- Boy Meets World – ABC (Producer, 1994–1996)
- Something So Right – NBC (Supervising Producer, 1996–1997)
- The Tom Show – WB (Co-Executive Producer, 1997–1998)
- The Wrong Coast – AMC (Consulting Producer, 2002–2003)
