= Maryedith Burrell =

American actress

- Education: University of California, Los Angeles, University of North Carolina, Asheville
- Occupations: Actress; writer; producer; documentarian
- Years active: 1979–present

Maryedith Burrell is an American actress, producer, writer and documentarian best known for starring roles on the television series Fridays, Throb, Ron Howard's Parenthood, and The Jackie Thomas Show as well as recurring roles in the television series Seinfeld and Home Improvement.

== Early life ==
Burrell is a native of Gilroy, California, and the daughter of Howard and Patricia Smith. After attending Santa Catalina School on scholarship, Burrell headed to UC Santa Cruz, working and studying simultaneously with American Conservatory Theater and The San Francisco Mime Troupe. While attending college, Burrell workshopped with The Royal Shakespeare Company and director Peter Brook, as well as Teatro Campensino with Louis Valdez. After two terms at UCSC, she transferred to UCLA and as a student in its Theatre Arts Program received the Hugh O'Brian acting award. The acting award judges included Academy Award winner Jack Lemmon, who became an early mentor. She graduated from UCLA in 1974. Roles on television shows such as Days of Our Lives, M*A*S*H and Remington Steele soon followed.

== Early acting and writing ==
After attending college, Burrell performed with and stage managed for LA Free Shakespeare Company and also worked as a publicist for the new Westwood Playhouse. While there she met actors Jason Robards, Shelley Winters, and Lee Grant who encouraged her to pursue an acting career. She soon began performing with the Los Angeles-based improv troupe The Groundlings, The Second City, The Comedy Store Players, Sills And Company, Off The Wall, and War Babies. At War Babies, Ann Marcus, producer of Norman Lear's Mary Hartman, Mary Hartman, invited Burrell to write for The Life and Times of Eddie Roberts. This kicked off a second career in screen writing.

== Fridays ==
In 1979, the producers of Fridays saw Burrell in an HBO presentation of War Babies at The Roxy Theatre and tapped her for their new American Broadcasting Company (ABC) late-night comedy show. She became a member of the ensemble, which included Larry David, Michael Richards, and Melanie Chartoff. Her characterizations of the deadly serious Friday Focus Reporter and Battle Boy's chain-smoking mother were standouts.

== Post Fridays ==
Shelley Duvall hired Burrell to write for her series, Faerie Tale Theatre. The award-winning show was unique at the time for its cross-pollination of star talent from stage, television, and film. Burrell worked with directors Francis Ford Coppola, Michael Lindsay-Hogg, Peter Medak, and Tim Burton as well as actors Susan Sarandon, Lee Remick, Carrie Fisher, Klaus Kinski, and Burgess Meredith.

Burrell wrote an adaptation of The Little Match Girl for NBC in December 1987, starring William Daniels. This launched a career writing films and mini-series for every major television network in America as well as several in Europe. Credits include: Mr. St. Nick, The Great Mom Swap, UFO Cafe, Mabel and the Bootleg King, The Last Vampire, Janus Highway, and Dominion for TNT.

She pursued dual careers as a performer and screenwriter. After Fridays, Burrell went on to star in the television series Throb, Ron Howard's Parenthood, The Jackie Thomas Show, and appeared in recurring roles on Seinfeld and Home Improvement. She guest-starred on television shows including Murder, She Wrote, Chicago Hope and The Tonight Show. Burrell acted in several television films, including White Hot: The Mysterious Death of Thelma Todd with Loni Anderson and Those She Left Behind with Gary Cole. She also acted in feature films including Samantha with Martha Plimpton, Ready To Rumble with Oliver Platt, and Kiss Me Goodbye with Sally Field and Jeff Bridges.

As a documentarian, she has produced for National Geographic, Discovery Channel, and TLC, among other networks. In 2018, Burrell worked as creative consultant on an independent film, Raise Hell: The Life and Times of Molly Ivins, about author and activist Molly Ivins.

An overall deal with Disney led Burrell to work as a script doctor for both feature films and television, which she continues to do. Her feature work includes Dominion for Paramount, The Dating Project for Universal, and Emily Post for Sony.

Over the years, she has continued to work in the theatre staging musicals and operas, improv review and experimental projects internationally. She mounted Gilbert and Sullivan's "Patience" for the Antaeus Theatre Company in Los Angeles as well as the "Shocked & Odd" tour for recording artist, Michelle Shocked. In 2014, Burrell created and performed her one-woman show, #OUCH!: An Accidental Comedy, based on her journey thru the American Medical system. She took it to the NY International Fringe Festival where it garnered Top 10 raves.

== Filmography (actress) ==
Year	Title	Role	Notes
1979	Barnaby Jones	Nurse	1 Episode
1979	Dallas	Nurse Barker	1 Episode
1980	Taxi	Hatcheck Girl	1 Episode
1980	Wholly Moses	Villager	Film
1980	Fridays	Ensemble Cast Member	54 episodes
1982	Filthy Rich	Wanda Dean	1 Episode
1982	Kiss Me Goodbye	Mrs. Newman	Film
1983	Trapper John, M.D.	Mary Lamagra	1 Episode
1984	Last of the Great Survivors	Vie	TV movie
1984	Faerie Tale Theatre	Beggar Woman	1 Episode
1984	Paper Dolls	Polly Loftus	1 Episode
1984	Newhart	Attorney Arleen	1 Episode
1985	Family Ties	Young May	1 Episode
1983–1986	Simon & Simon	Mary Johnson, Mary DeAngelo	2 episodes
1984–1986	Remington Steele	Frances Piper	2 episodes
1986	Big Trouble	Gail	Film
1986	Say Yes	Gladys	Film
1986	River's Edge		Film
1987	The Little Match Girl	Rita	TV movie
1986–1988	Throb	Meredith	48 episodes
1988	Annie McGuire		1 Episode
1989	Those She Left Behind	Ann Hobson	TV movie
1991	Eve of Destruction	Dawn Perlin	Film
1991	White Hot: The Mysterious Murder of Thelma Todd	Patsy Kelly	TV movie
1990–1991	Parenthood	Helen Buckman	12 episodes
1991	Bad Attitudes	Katyana	TV movie
1992	Samantha	Charlotte Otto / Mrs. Samantha	Film
1992–1993	The Jackie Thomas Show	Nancy Mincher	18 episodes
1992–1993	Seinfeld	Maryedith / Mother	2 episodes
1994	Camp Nowhere	Gwen Nowicki	Film
1996	Murder, She Wrote	Nattie Holt	1 Episode
1996	Duckman		1 Episode
1996	Lois & Clark: The New Adventures of Superman	Veronica Stewart	1 Episode
1996–1997	Home Improvement	Tracy	2 episodes
1998	Chicago Hope	Dr. Louise Ginsberg	1 Episode
1998	Mike Hammer, Private Eye	Calvin's Neighbor	1 Episode
2000	Ready to Rumble	Nun #1	Film

== Filmography (writer) ==
1985	From Here To Maternity	TV Short
1986	Popples	TV movie (teleplay)
1984–1987	Faerie Tale Theatre	TV series (5 episodes)
1987	The Little Match Girl	TV movie
1991	In The Nick of Time	TV movie
1992	Hot Chocolate	TV movie
1995	The Great Mom Swap	TV movie
2001	Second Honeymoon	TV movie
2002	Mr. St. Nick	TV movie

== Publishing and teaching ==
Burrell earned a Master of Liberal Arts degree at the University of North Carolina Asheville, and now lectures in universities, conservatories, and film festivals around the country. She also coaches corporately.

An author and journalist, she has contributed to Rolling Stone, The Los Angeles Times, The San Francisco Chronicle, The Great Smokies Review, and other publications. Her essay, An Affair to Forget, is included in the anthology What Was I Thinking? 58 Bad Boyfriend Stories §(St. Martin's Press).
