= Bullshot Crummond =

1974 parody stage play

Bullshot Crummond is a parody stage play of the British pulp hero Bulldog Drummond. The play was based on an idea by Ron House and Diz White, was written in 1974 and first performed that year, by Ron House, Diz White, John Neville-Andrews, Alan Shearman, Brandis Kemp (Lenya Von Bruno), and Derek Cunningham at the Palladium Theater, 1031 Kearny Street, San Francisco, California.

It was later made into a 1983 film, Bullshot.

== Synopsis ==
The play concerns a pre-WWII plot by the dastardly Count Otto Von Brunno and his ambiguous relation Lenya Von Brunno to ruin the international diamond market by kidnapping Professor Rupert Fenton. Working against them are Hugh "Bullshot" Crummond and Rosemary Fenton (the professor's daughter). The characters are highly stereotypical: Otto a German supervillain, Lenya a femme fatale, Fenton an absent-minded professor, Rosemary a damsel in distress who faints and runs around in her underwear, and Crummond a highly intelligent and quick-witted hero. However, at many times during the play, humor arises because Crummond fails to notice something very obvious, or because he is easily defeated in a fight.

Much of the play's humor comes from its audacious (and intentionally failed) efforts to recreate film effects onstage. Examples include:

- At the beginning of the show, the Von Brunnos are piloting an airplane to England, then parachute out. This is represented by a model of a German aircraft dangling in front of the theatre curtain, then two dolls being tossed onto the stage from behind the curtain. The lights black out, and when they come back on, the actors playing Otto and Lenya are onstage, covered by parachutes.
- There is an onstage "car chase" between the heroes and villains. Lenya and Otto stand behind a large cut-out of a car and "see" Crummond following them on the road. Then, a quick change takes place, leaving Rosemary and Crummond standing behind exactly the same cutout. This effect repeats itself until Crummond's car plunges over a cliff.
- Lenya has a pet falcon named Fritz—really a mechanical bird that flaps its wings when the actress moves her arm.
- At one point, Otto "mimics" the Professor's voice to trick Crummond. In reality, the actor playing the Professor speaks with his mouth hidden from view, and the Otto actor lip-synchs.

Other humor arises from the plot, which relies on bizarre coincidences and unlikely events. For instance, when Crummond and Rosemary are in a tight spot, they manage to catch a wild carrier pigeon and have it convey a message from them; or a mysterious assassin steals an important letter, but because the letter had tea spilled on it, its ink stained a cloth napkin, so that Crummond can still figure out what it said. Otto's plots to kill Crummond include poison, a tarantula's bite, a stick of dynamite triggered by the "Converse Force Field", and a sword fight. The play is structured more as an excuse for comic gags than as an actually coherent plot.

The show is designed to be performed by only five actors, one of whom plays seven characters: Professor Fenton; Crummond's friend Algy; a Chinese assassin; a local police officer; a waiter in a hotel restaurant; a one-armed Scotland Yard inspector (who is really one of Otto's henchmen in disguise); and a Cockney crook. In addition, the actor playing Otto plays Salvatore Scalicio, a Chicago gangster, in a quick-change scene where he repeatedly switches between Otto and Salvatore.
