= Bullshot (film) =

1983 British parody comedy

- Directed by: Dick Clement
- Written by: Ronald E. House; Alan Shearman; Diz White
- Based on: Bullshot Crummond
- Produced by: Ian La Frenais
- Starring: Alan Shearman; Diz White; Ronald E. House
- Cinematography: Alex Thomson
- Edited by: Allan Jones
- Music by: John Du Prez
- Production company: Handmade Films
- Distributed by: Island Pictures
- Release date: 20 October 1983 (London)
- Running time: 85 minutes
- Country: United Kingdom
- Language: English
- Budget: Under $3 million

Bullshot is a 1983 British comedy film, based on the stage play Bullshot Crummond. The play's title is a parody of the 1929 film Bulldog Drummond, the lead character having elements of Drummond and Biggles.

It was the first of two films made by Dick Clement and Ian La Frenais for HandMade Films, the second being Water.

== Plot ==
Set in the 1930s, Bullshot follows the absurd adventures of Captain Hugh "Bullshot" Crummond, a dim-witted but overconfident British hero, as he attempts to rescue Professor Fenton and stop the evil Count Otto von Bruno and Lenya von Bruno from stealing a secret energy formula. A parody of vintage adventure serials, the film features exaggerated heroics, slapstick comedy, and spoofed melodrama. Crummond ultimately defeats the villains and saves the day with the help of Rosemary Fenton.

== Cast ==
=== Main cast ===
- Alan Shearman as Captain Hugh "Bullshot" Crummond
- Diz White as Rosemary Fenton
- Ronald E. House as Count Otto van Bruno
- Frances Tomelty as Lenya von Bruno
- Michael Aldridge as Professor Rupert Fenton

=== Supporting cast ===
- Christopher Good as Lord Binky Brancaster
- Ron Pember as Dobbs
- Mel Smith as Crouch
- Billy Connolly as "Hawkeye" McGillicuddy
- Geoffrey Bayldon as Colonel Hinchcliff
- Bryan Pringle as Waiter
- Angela Thorne as Hotel Manageress

=== Additional appearances cameos ===
- Peter Bayliss as Chairman of The Institute
- Christopher Godwin as Maître D'
- John Wells as American Scientist
- Derek Deadman as Reg Erskine
- Legs Larry Smith as "Dusty" Miller
- John Du Prez as "Ginger" Johnson
- G. B. "Zoot" Money as "Chalky" White
- Ray Cooper as Len Cunningham
- Paul Herzberg as German Officer
- Rupert Frazer as British Officer
- Christina Greatrex, Francesca Brill, and Lucy Hornak as Ladies at Henley
- Ted Moult as Station Porter
- Hilary Mason as Hotel Guest
- Ann Way as Hotel Guest
- Ballard Berkeley as Hotel Guest
- Diana Van Proosdy as Female Scientist
- Albert Evansky as Albert Einstein
- Anthony Milner as Policeman
- Nicholas Lyndhurst as "Nobby" Clark, soldier in the trenches

== Production ==
The film was based on the play Bullshot Crummond which was first performed in the 1970s and had toured in North America, including a four-year run in San Francisco and a year's run in Los Angeles. While in Los Angeles the makers tried to pitch the play as a film but could not find interest.

Ron House was auditioning for Dick Clement and told the director about Bullshot Crummond. Clement was interested and was sent a copy of the production filmed for cable television in 1979. Clement showed this to HandMade Films who agreed to finance.

Alan Shearman, Diz White, and Ronald E. House reprised their roles from the original stage production. "Ron, Diz and I have worked together for 12 years," said Shearman. "Then suddently there were two more people, Dick and Ian [La Frenais], on the exact same wavelength. It was marvellous. HandMade Films are pretty marvellous as well. We had never realised that people in the film industry worked the way that they do - taking a close interest in what you are doing but at the same time letting you go and do it in your own way."

Principal photography took place primarily at Shepperton Studios in Surrey, England, with some location shooting in and around London. The film was shot mostly on studio sets designed to mimic the exaggerated and stylised look of 1930s adventure serials. The production sought to retain the theatrical and spoof-driven tone of the play. Filming began April 1983.

== Release ==
Bullshot opened at the Classic Cinema on Haymarket, London on 20 October 1983.

== Reception ==
The film was poorly reviewed by British critics except for Barry Norman. The Observer felt "the appropriate length for this kind of thing is a ten minute sketch." The Evening Standard felt it "has a good chance of winning an audience if critics keep quiet about it" calling it "a good looking parody" that "as for jokes, it blows every one that director Dick Clement tries to set up."

Colin Greenland reviewed Bullshot for Imagine magazine, praising its energetic and comedic style. He described the film as "pell-mell, hammer and tongs, hell for leather all the way through a plot that gets more deliciously ludicrous by the second". Greenland highlighted the "superb (over-)acting in spiffing costumes on scrummy sets", noting the abundance of laughter-inducing moments and memorable comic cameos by Billy Connolly, Mel Smith, John Wells, and 'Legs' Larry Smith.

The film received mixed reviews from mainstream critics. Some praised its affectionate parody of 1930s adventure serials and the performances of the lead actors, while others found its humour uneven and overly reliant on theatrical farce.

Michael Palin wrote in his diary about seeing the film: "Find the first ten minutes very ordinary, and the overplayed style rather offputting, but the film gradually wins me over, by its sheer panache and good nature."
