= Bruce Mahler =

American actor, producer, and writer

Bruce Mahler is an American actor, producer, and writer. He is known for his role as Sgt. Fackler in the comedy films Police Academy, and as Rabbi Glickman (Note: Mahler's character is referred to as "Rabbi Glickman" in one episode and "Rabbi Kirschbaum" in another. The characters' mannerisms and backstory are otherwise identical and it seems that these were intended to be the same character, with the name change being a simple continuity error.) on the sitcom Seinfeld.

== Biography ==
Bruce was born in 1950 in New York City. In 1977, Mahler appeared on two episodes of the TV series Fernwood 2 Night. In 1980, he appeared on Fridays, an early 1980s ABC sketch show modeled after NBC's Saturday Night Live, where most of his appearances showcased his musical talent and radio DJ-style voice, most notably in the recurring sketches "The Latin DJ" and the one-off sketches "KPLO" (about Palestine Liberation Organization terrorists hosting a radio show in their bunker) and "A Classical Get-Down" (about a classical pianist who hosts his radio show like a Top 40 station).

Two years after Fridays was cancelled, Mahler portrayed Sgt. Douglas Fackler in the 1984 film Police Academy. His other film work has included 1984's Friday the 13th: The Final Chapter, the 1985 sequel Police Academy 2: Their First Assignment, the American sitcom Diff'rent Strokes, 1986's Police Academy 3: Back in Training, 1987's Funland, and the 1989 sequel Police Academy 6: City Under Siege.

In the 1990s, Mahler appeared on the television series The Famous Teddy Z and had a recurring role on Seinfeld. He had minor roles in the movies Hook, Dick Tracy and Loaded Weapon 1. From 1995 to 1998, he starred as a rabbi whom Elaine befriends in the Seinfeld episodes "The Postponement", "The Hot Tub" (scene deleted), "The Serenity Now" and "The Finale".

== Filmography ==
Year	Title	Role	Notes
1977	Fernwood 2 Night	Howard Palmer	Recurring role (2 episodes)
1980–82	Fridays	Various characters	Main cast (54 episodes)
1984	Police Academy	Cadet Doug Fackler	
1984	Friday the 13th: The Final Chapter	Axel	
1985	Police Academy 2: Their First Assignment	Cadet Doug Fackler	
1985	Diff'rent Strokes	Captain Jack	Episode: "It's My Party and I'll Cry If I Want To"
1986	Police Academy 3: Back in Training	Sgt. Doug Fackler	
1987	Funland	Mike Spencer	
1989	Police Academy 6: City Under Siege	Sgt. Doug Fackler	
1990	The Famous Teddy Z		Episode: "Pitching the Net"
1990	Dick Tracy	Reporter	Uncredited
1991	Hook	Pirate	Uncredited
1993	Loaded Weapon 1	District Attorney #2	Uncredited
1995–98	Seinfeld	Rabbi Glickman	Recurring role (3 episodes)
1998	Monster Farm	Count Cluckula, Doctor Woolly/Mr. Ewwe, various	Voice role (13 episodes)
2000	The Perfect Storm	Mr. Moss	Uncredited
2000	Scary Movie	Homey #2	Uncredited
